= 2014 Serena Williams tennis season =

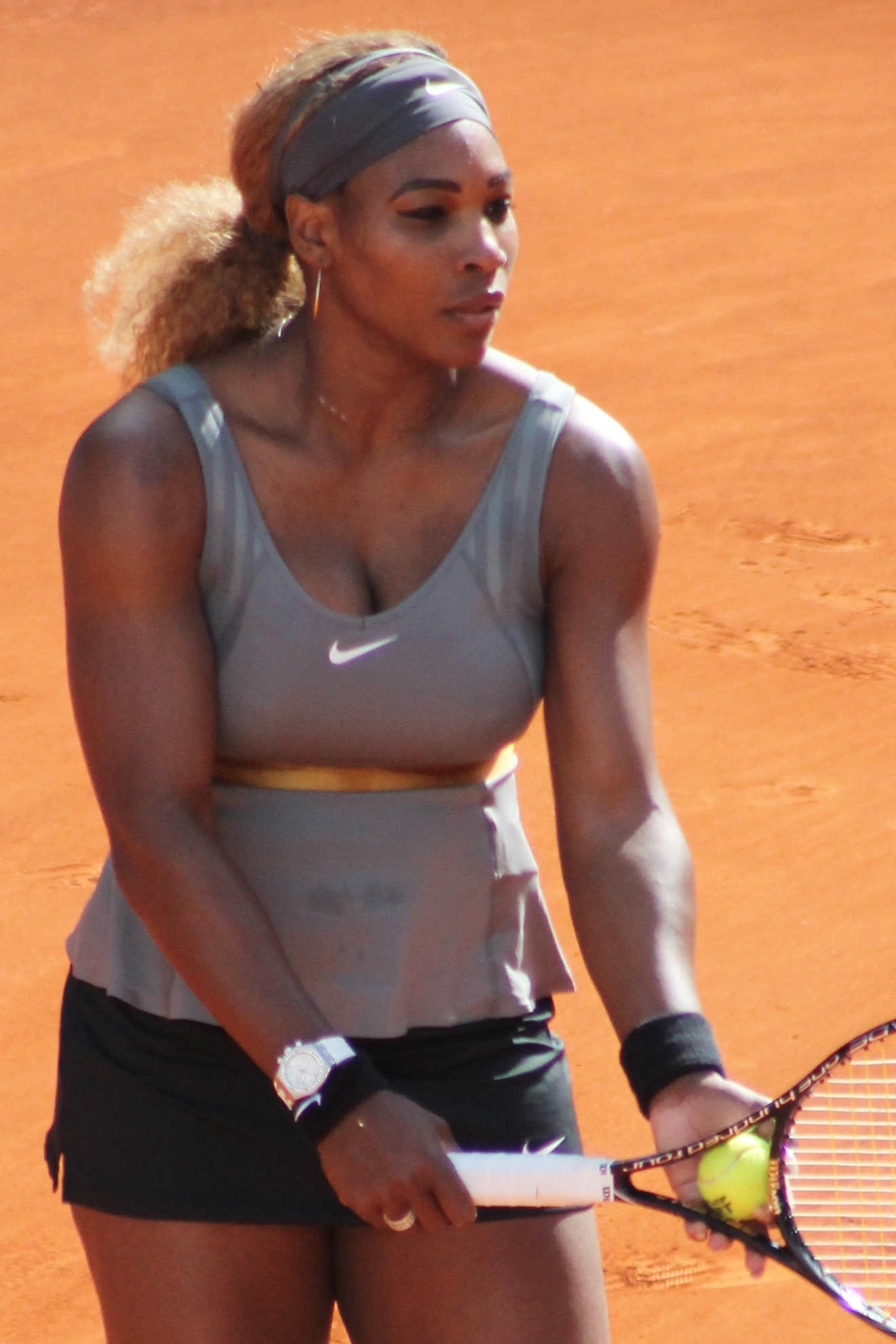
- Williams at the Mutua Madrid Open
- Full name: Serena Jameka Williams
- Country: United States
- Calendar prize money: $9,317,298

Singles
- Season record: 52–8
- Calendar titles: 7
- Year-end ranking: No. 1
- Ranking change from previous year: No change

Grand Slam & significant results
- Australian Open: 4R
- French Open: 2R
- Wimbledon: 3R
- US Open: W
- Tour Finals: W

Doubles
- Season record: 4–3
- Year-end ranking: No. 133
- Ranking change from previous year: ▼70

Grand Slam doubles results
- Australian Open: Withdrew
- French Open: DNP
- Wimbledon: 2R
- US Open: QF
- Last updated on: 2 September 2014.

The 2014 Serena Williams tennis season officially began on 30 December with the start of the 2014 WTA Tour, and follows on from an 18-match winning streak which began at the end of the 2013 Season. Williams finished the year at no. 1, and held the ranking for the entire year, which had not been done since Steffi Graf in 1996. It is also fourth time that Williams ended as the number 1 player in the year. Based on her performance in 2014, she was named 'World Champion' for the fifth time and the third time in a row.

== Year in detail ==
=== Early hard court season and Australian Open ===
==== Brisbane International ====
Williams began her season at the Brisbane International, where she was the defending champion and no. 1 seed. Williams received a bye in the first round. She played her first match of the 2014 season against German Andrea Petkovic. The pair traded breaks in the 3rd and 4th game, Williams broke once again at the ninth game and served the set out. Williams broke in the fifth game of the second set and held the break to serve it out in the tenth game. Williams made 35 winners including 11 aces and 36 unforced errors in the match. In the quarterfinals, Williams faced Dominika Cibulková. In the first set, Williams broke in the eight game and closed it out the following game, Williams won the set without a dropping a point in serve. Williams broke in the ninth game of the second set to win the match. Williams hit 32 winners with 12 aces and 17 unforced errors to her opponent's 7 winners and 11 unforced errors. In the final four, Williams faced Russian Maria Sharapova. The first saw Sharapova breaking once, however, Williams broke the Russian three times including in the eight game to win the set. In the second set, there were six breaks of serve that saw the set go to a tie-break. Williams closed it out with her third match point. Williams only served 44% of her first serves in the match and made 7 double faults to Sharapova's 8. In the final, it was world no. 1 vs no. 2, as Williams took on Victoria Azarenka. In the first set, Williams came on top, needing only a break in the seventh game to close it out with an ace in the tenth game. Williams made 14 winners, 12 unforced errors, 4 aces and no double faults in the set, while Azarenka made 3, 8, 1 and 3 respectively. The second set saw Williams edge out a break early, but Azarenka won four games in a row to get the break advantage. Williams was able to get it back on serve, and broke in the eleventh game and closed out the match. Williams ended with 30 winners and unforced with 11 aces, Azarenka on other hand made 15 winners to 23 unforced errors, and a single ace to 3 double faults.

==== Australian Open ====
Williams entered the Australian Open as the heavy favorite to win the title and was the number 1 seed. She was coming off a 22 match winning streak that stretches from the 2013 US Open. In the first round she faced wildcard Ashleigh Barty. She broke Barty twice in the first set and served it out in the eighth game. In the second set, Williams broke Barty three times, including in the final game in the seventh game of the second to close it out in just under an hour. Williams didn't drop a point behind her first serve in the entire match and hit 31 winners and 17 unforced errors. In the following round, Williams faced Vesna Dolonc, In the first set, Williams broke twice and served it out in the seventh game. In the second, Williams broke twice again and saved the only break point she faced in the tournament to serve it out in the eight game. Williams hit 24 winners, 10 of which were aces. In the third round, Williams took on Daniela Hantuchová. In the first set, Williams had only one break point and converted, while saving all six break points she faced to win the set in the ninth game. In the second set, Williams broke early, however Hantuchová broke back in the sixth game. Williams then won the last three games to win the match. Williams dispatched another 10 aces in the match. This match meant she has won the most matches in the Australian Open with 61. Williams next opponent was the 14th seed Ana Ivanovic. The first set saw Williams break in the tenth game to take the set. However, in the second set, Ivanovic broke Williams twice including in the ninth game to take the set. In the final set, Ivanovic broke Williams to love in the second game and that was enough to close out the match in the ninth game. The loss to Ivanovic snaps a 25 match winning streak which was her second-longest winning streak of her career. It was also Williams' first loss to Ivanovic, having won their four previous meetings in straight sets and losing no more than four games in each set. It is revealed after the match the Williams had a back injury and almost withdrew prior to her third round match.

==== Dubai Duty Free Tennis Championships ====
Williams then received a wildcard in to the Dubai Duty Free Tennis Championships, which saw her return to the tournament for the first since the 2009 edition of the championships. Williams being the top seed received a bye through the first round. In the second round she faced Ekaterina Makarova. Although the Russian served for the first set, Williams broke back to force a first set tiebreak. After saving two set points and winning the first set, Williams racked off six straight games to win the match and advance. In the quarterfinals she faced long-time rival Jelena Janković. Despite winning comfortably in straight sets, Williams exchanged words with Janković in the final service game of the match over how quickly the Serb was serving. In the final four, Williams faced Alizé Cornet. Williams kept the first set on serve until being broken in the eleventh game. Williams was unable to create a break point and lost the set in the following game. Following an immediate break at the start of the second set, Williams converted her sole break point of the match in the fourth game to level. However it wasn't enough as Cornet broke for a third time at 3–3 with a forehand passing shot winner. The French No. 1 held her nerve and served out the match to love to get her first win over a world No. 1.

==== Sony Open Tennis ====
Williams returned to the Sony Open Tennis as defending champion and as the top seed she received a bye through to the second round where she faced Yaroslava Shvedova. She took the first set in a tiebreak after having to break to stay in the set. The second set was won more comfortably. In the third round Williams had to overcome an in-form Caroline Garcia. After taking the opening set Garcia fought back and took the second set by the same score. Williams went up an early break in the final set, which despite being interrupted by rain, proved decisive as the world No. 1 did not face a single break point on her serve. Williams then took on fellow American Coco Vandeweghe in the fourth round. Vandeweghe met William's dominant serve with equally big serves of her own, but Williams stepped up her return game taking four of nine break point opportunities created. This win set up a fifth career meeting with fifth seeded Angelique Kerber in the quarterfinals. Williams took the match comprehensively in straight sets, losing only four games. The semifinals saw a rematch of the previous years final against the fourth seed Maria Sharapova. After falling behind 1–4 in the first set, Williams racked off five straight games to take the first set, finishing the set with 11 winners including 5 aces. Again Williams fell behind an early break at the start of the second set, but the world No. 1 broke back immediately to level. Williams earned the first of two service breaks to take the second set and the match. In the final Williams faced the new world No. 2 Li Na. Much like her semifinal match, Williams had a sluggish start to the opening set, struggling to get her first serve in play. She fell behind to China's No. 1 player, however, Williams regrouped and broke to stay in the first set on her third break opportunity. A quick hold to fifteen followed and Li Na was forced to serve for the set a second time. This time the Chinese player held a set point but Williams saved it with backhand winner down the line. She followed this up by hitting a huge forehand return winner creating another break point to stay in the set, which she eventually took. Williams broke again to come back and take the set. Li Na stopped the loss of six consecutive games by holding serve for 1–1 in the second set. Williams responded by winning the next five games, the match and her seventh Miami title, finishing with 29 winners to 29 unforced errors. This seventh tournament win in Miami put her ahead of Andre Agassi for most Miami titles won by any individual player, male or female.

=== Clay court season and French Open ===
==== Family Circle Cup ====
Williams began her clay season on the green clay courts of the Family Circle Cup. She entered the tournament as the two-time defending champion and top seed and received a bye past the first round. In the second round she faced world No. 78 Jana Čepelová. She lost the opening five games, losing her serve three times to the young Slovak, but the world No. 1 surged back to win four straight games and trail by a single break. Despite holding a break point on her opponent's serve to level the match, Čepelová served out the set on her third attempt. The two players exchanged breaks early in the second set, but it was ultimately the Slovak who gained the decisive break in the seventh game. Čepelová's win ended William's 28 match winning streak on clay, dating back to her win in the opening round of the 2013 edition of the same tournament.

==== Mutua Madrid Open ====
After her first loss on clay since 2012, Williams returned to Mutua Madrid Open in pursuit of her third consecutive title at the tournament. Her campaign got underway against former junior world No.1 Belinda Bencic in the first round. Williams overcame the Swiss qualifier, breaking her serve five times throughout the match, which included a run of 21 consecutive points for the world No. 1. In the second round Williams came up against the world No.1 doubles player Peng Shuai. In their first meeting since 2009, Williams was dominant from the beginning, hitting 28 winners including 11 aces, winning the match in straight sets. In the round of 16, Williams played local player Carla Suárez Navarro, whom in their last meeting failed to win a single game. The Spaniard, however, put up a much more respectable scoreline on her favorite surface, winning five games, including a break of the Williams serves in the opening game of the match. Ultimately, Williams came through the match untroubled with a straight sets victory. Williams was set to face world No.6 Petra Kvitová in the quarterfinals but the world No.1 withdrew before their match, citing a left thigh injury, which she had heavily strapped from the second round onwards.

==== Internazionali BNL d'Italia ====
Williams came into the Internazionali BNL d'Italia in search of her 60th career singles title. As top seed she received a bye through the first round to face Andrea Petkovic in the second round, whom she defeated dropping only 4 games, taking an early double break lead in each set. In the following round, she face compatriot Varvara Lepchenko. Williams won the first set with a breadstick and dominated the second set despite getting broken, dropping only two games. In the last 8, Williams faced surprise quarterfinalist Zhang Shuai of China and cruised passed her opponent, breaking her opponent four times in the first set and won the second with a single break. This win set up a rematch of her 4th round loss at the 2014 Australian Open as she took on Ana Ivanovic. Similar to their Australian Open match, Williams won the first set, while Ivanovic won the second. In the final set, Williams took the first 5 games and closed it out two games after to gain revenge on her Serbian opponent. In the final, she faced Italian Sara Errani, Williams took an early break lead, before Errani could break back in the 7th game to take it back on serve. However, Williams took the next eight games to win the match with a bagel in the second set to successfully defend her title.

==== French Open ====
Williams came into the French Open as the defending champion and the top seed. She faced good friend Alizé Lim of France in the first round and won the match dropping only three games. In the second round, Williams faced Spain's Garbiñe Muguruza and suffered her worst loss at a slam, only claiming four games in two sets in 64 minutes. Williams finished the match with 8 winners and 29 unforced errors, to Mugurza's 12 winners and 18 unforced errors.

=== Wimbledon ===
Williams came into Wimbledon after falling short in her past two slams, Williams is trying to regain form in the slams. Williams faced compatriot Anna Tatishvili in the first round and made quick work of her dropping just 3 games with the help of 16 aces. In the second round, she took on Chanelle Scheepers and made quick work of the South African in just 49 minutes with a drop of just two games. In the third round, Williams faced France's Alizé Cornet, Cornet broke Williams in the first game, but Williams won six games in a row to win the set, after a rain delay after the second game. In the second set, Cornet raced to win the first five games, but Williams came back to win the next three games, Cornet then served it out in the ninth game to push it to a deciding set. In the third set, Cornet served for the match at the eight game, but Williams broke and held serve to make Cornet serve it out again in the ninth game and Cornet was able to serve it out in the ninth to reach the fourth round. This is the worst performance of Williams in the slams for a single season since 2006.

Williams played doubles with her sister Venus and faced the team of Oksana Kalashnikova and Olga Savchuk and won in three sets after losing the first set. In the second round they faced Kristina Barrois and Stefanie Vögele and ended with a loss after retiring being down 0–3, with Williams reportedly suffering from viral illness, being unable to pick up a ball and also being unable to serve.

=== US Open Series ===
==== Bank of the West Classic ====
Williams came into the Bank of the West Classic, aiming to regain form after the disappointment in the French Open and Wimbledon. Williams also entered the event with a nine-match winning streak winning it in 2011 and 2012 and missing the event in 2013. She received a bye in the first round and faced Karolína Plíšková, the pair held comfortably throughout the first with no break points until Williams broke at love in the twelfth game. In the second set Williams broke twice and served it out in the eight game. In the quarterfinals, Williams faced Ana Ivanovic, Ivanovic took control of the first set breaking her American opponent twice and not facing a break point to take the set. Williams came back in the second set, taking an early break in the second game and didn't look back to push it to a deciding set. In the final set, Williams broke in a long first game, but the Serbian broke back in the sixth game. They then traded breaks until Williams served it out in the 12th game to take the match. In the final four, Williams took on Germany's Andrea Petkovic, they stood toe-to-toe in the first ten games, until Williams reeled in eight straight games to take the first set and win the second set at love. In the final, Williams faced Angelique Kerber, Kerber took an early lead winning five games in a row, until Williams won five games in a row herself. Williams then claimed it in a tiebreak. Williams then broke in the first and ninth game to win the match and claim her fourth title of the year.

==== Rogers Cup ====
Serena came into the event as the defending champion, being the 1st seed she received a bye in the first round and dominated her second round opponent in Samantha Stosur, winning the match losing only two game including a bagel in the first set. In the third round she faced Czech Lucie Šafářová, in a tightly contested two set victory for Williams, where she broke Šafářová at the end of each set to win the match. In the last eight, Williams took on Caroline Wozniacki, Wozniacki took the first set with a single break lead and led by a break in the second set, but Williams came back and broke back and broke again in the twelfth game to push it to a decider. In the deciding set, the pair was even until Williams broke in the twelfth game to take the match. In their first meeting in over a year, Serena Williams took on her sister Venus in match for a spot in the final. Venus took an early break lead, but Serena came back and won the set in a tie-break. However, Venus dominated the next two sets to win the match, and beat her sister for the first time in five years.

==== Western & Southern Open ====
Williams, similar to the Rogers Cup received a bye in the first round of the Western & Southern Open and faced Samantha Stosur in the following round. The match was a lot tighter than their match in Montreal, However Williams came out as the victor in two tie-break sets winning both nine points to seven. The match also did not have any breaks of serve nor any break points. In the round of 16, Williams defeated Ital y's Flavia Pennetta in two quick sets, dropping only two games in each set, making 28 winners and 25 unforced errors in the process. In the quarterfinals, Williams took on Jelena Janković, Williams took the first set dropping only a game. In the second set, the Serbian took an early brake lead, but Williams came back winning five of the last six games, to win the set and the match in just 58 minutes. In the last 4, Williams for the second straight week faced Caroline Wozniacki, like their previous encounter, Williams made a slow start giving the first set to the Dane. However, Williams again turned in around winning the next two sets to advance to the final. The match featured 15 breaks of serves, with Williams breaking serve eight times while Wozniacki broke seven times. Williams made 36 winners to her opponents 8 and 41 unforced errors to her opponents 23. The win awarded Williams the US Open Series for the third time. Williams faced Serbia's Ana Ivanovic in the final, Ivanovic took an early break lead and had a break point for a double break lead in the fifth game, however she could not convert. Williams then took the game and 10 of the next 12 games to win her first Cincinnati title. Williams hit 12 aces in the match.

==== US Open ====
Williams came into the US Open as the two-time defending champion and the world no. 1. Williams started off her campaign against young American Taylor Townsend and blasted past the 18-year-old, dropping just four games including a breadstick in the second in just 55 minutes. Williams made sixteen winners to just eight unforced errors to her opponents six winners and fourteen unforced errors. In the second round, she took another American in Vania King, Serena made quick work of her compatriot dropping just a game in two sets in 57 minutes with the aide of 25 winners in the entire match. In the following round, she faced her third American opponent in a row in Varvara Lepchenko, Williams had a tougher time this time around despite losing only three games in each set including saving a break point in the sixth game of the second set, to prevent her opponent to take a break lead against her. In the round of 16, Williams took on Estonia's Kaia Kanepi and picked up a similar scoreline as the previous round with nineteen winners and sixteen unforced errors. This win marks the first time Williams gets past the fourth of the slam in the year. In the last eight, Williams had Italian Flavia Pennetta between her and the final four. Pennetta had an early lead winning the first three games and breaking Williams twice, however the American came back strong and won 12 of the next 14 games to advance. In the semifinals, Williams faced Ekaterina Makarova and beat the Russian in just an hour including a breadstick in the second set to advance to the final. In the final, the person standing between Williams and her 18th slam, was Caroline Wozniacki, this is the third time the two are facing in the span of a month with Williams winning the previous two in three sets. However, the match was one-sided in Williams' favor, with Williams winning dropping three game in each set and hitting more winners than her opponent an outstanding 29 winners to 4 winners. This marks milestones for Williams, including the first women since Evert in 1977 to win three US Opens in a row, the most US Open titles in the Open Era with six tying her with Evert and her 18th slam, placing her second in the open era and 4th in the all-time count of most slams with Chris Evert and Martina Navratilova. Williams also earned the highest single paycheck in the history of tennis with an outstanding $4 million, with the $1 million bonus coming from winning the US Open Series.

=== Asian hard court swing and WTA Finals ===
==== Dongfeng Motor Wuhan Open ====
Williams came into the Wuhan Open as the top seed. She received a bye in the first round and took on France's Alizé Cornet and had to retire due to viral illness prior to serving for the first set at the twelfth game. This is Williams' third loss to Cornet in the year, the first time she lost to a single player thrice since 2007 to Justine Henin.

==== China Open ====
Williams came into the China Open as the defending champion and the top seed. She began her quest against Sílvia Soler Espinosa, Espinosa took an early lead taking the first five games of the match and serve for the set, however, Williams took the next seven games to win the set and then only lost two games in the second set to win the match.

==== WTA Finals ====
Serena Williams entered the WTA Finals as the favourite. In her first round robin match she beat Ana Ivanovic in two tough sets. She then suffered a shocking loss to Simona Halep who beat her 6–0, 6–2, equaling the worst loss of her career. The loss snapped Serena's 16-match win streak at the year-end Championships. She then rebounded against Eugenie Bouchard beating her in two sets. She subsequently qualified for the semifinals by virtue of Halep taking the second set from Ivanovic, despite losing the match in three sets. In the semi-finals she beat Caroline Wozniacki, coming back from one set down and 1–4 in the final set to clinch the match in three sets. In the final she played Simona Halep in a rematch of the round robin math. It was an easy two set victory, her third WTA finals championship in a row. Serena now owns five WTA Finals titles (2001, 2009, 2012, 2013, and 2014), tying her with Steffi Graf and only trailing Martina Navratilova who owns eight titles.

== All matches ==
=== Singles matches ===
Tournament	Match	Round	Opponent	Rank	Result	Score
Brisbane International; Brisbane, Australia; WTA Premier; Hard, outdoor 30 December 2013 – 5 January 2014	-	1R	Bye			
Brisbane International; Brisbane, Australia; WTA Premier; Hard, outdoor 30 December 2013 – 5 January 2014	745	2R	(Germany) Andrea Petkovic	#43	Win	6–4, 6–4
Brisbane International; Brisbane, Australia; WTA Premier; Hard, outdoor 30 December 2013 – 5 January 2014	746	QF	(Slovakia) Dominika Cibulková	#23	Win	6–3, 6–3
Brisbane International; Brisbane, Australia; WTA Premier; Hard, outdoor 30 December 2013 – 5 January 2014	747	SF	(Russia) Maria Sharapova	#4	Win	6–2, 7–6^{(9–7)}
Brisbane International; Brisbane, Australia; WTA Premier; Hard, outdoor 30 December 2013 – 5 January 2014	748	F	(Belarus) Victoria Azarenka	#2	Win (1)	6–4, 7–5
Australian Open; Melbourne, Australia; Grand Slam; Hard, outdoor 13–26 January 2014	749	1R	(Australia) Ashleigh Barty	#153	Win	6–2, 6–1
Australian Open; Melbourne, Australia; Grand Slam; Hard, outdoor 13–26 January 2014	750	2R	(Serbia) Vesna Dolonc	#104	Win	6–1, 6–2
Australian Open; Melbourne, Australia; Grand Slam; Hard, outdoor 13–26 January 2014	751	3R	(Slovakia) Daniela Hantuchová	#33	Win	6–3, 6–3
Australian Open; Melbourne, Australia; Grand Slam; Hard, outdoor 13–26 January 2014	752	4R	(Serbia) Ana Ivanovic	#14	Loss	6–4, 3–6, 3–6
Dubai Duty Free Tennis Championships; Dubai, United Arabic Emirates; WTA Premier; Hard, outdoor 17–22 February 2014	-	1R	Bye			
Dubai Duty Free Tennis Championships; Dubai, United Arabic Emirates; WTA Premier; Hard, outdoor 17–22 February 2014	753	2R	(Russia) Ekaterina Makarova	#24	Win	7–6^{(10–8)}, 6–0
Dubai Duty Free Tennis Championships; Dubai, United Arabic Emirates; WTA Premier; Hard, outdoor 17–22 February 2014	754	QF	(Serbia) Jelena Janković	#7	Win	6–2, 6–2
Dubai Duty Free Tennis Championships; Dubai, United Arabic Emirates; WTA Premier; Hard, outdoor 17–22 February 2014	755	SF	(France) Alizé Cornet	#26	Loss	4–6, 4–6
Sony Open Tennis; Miami, United States; WTA Premier Mandatory; Hard, outdoor 17–30 March 2014	-	1R	Bye			
Sony Open Tennis; Miami, United States; WTA Premier Mandatory; Hard, outdoor 17–30 March 2014	756	2R	(Kazakhstan) Yaroslava Shvedova	#59	Win	7–6^{(9–7)}, 6–2
Sony Open Tennis; Miami, United States; WTA Premier Mandatory; Hard, outdoor 17–30 March 2014	757	3R	(France) Caroline Garcia	#74	Win	6–4, 4–6, 6–4
Sony Open Tennis; Miami, United States; WTA Premier Mandatory; Hard, outdoor 17–30 March 2014	758	4R	(United States) Coco Vandeweghe	#104	Win	6–3, 6–1
Sony Open Tennis; Miami, United States; WTA Premier Mandatory; Hard, outdoor 17–30 March 2014	759	QF	(Germany) Angelique Kerber	#9	Win	6–2, 6–2
Sony Open Tennis; Miami, United States; WTA Premier Mandatory; Hard, outdoor 17–30 March 2014	760	SF	(Russia) Maria Sharapova	#7	Win	6–4, 6–3
Sony Open Tennis; Miami, United States; WTA Premier Mandatory; Hard, outdoor 17–30 March 2014	761	F	(China) Li Na	#2	Win (2)	7–5, 6–1
Family Circle Cup; Charleston, United States; WTA Premier; Clay (green), outdoor 31 March – 6 April 2014	-	1R	Bye			
Family Circle Cup; Charleston, United States; WTA Premier; Clay (green), outdoor 31 March – 6 April 2014	762	2R	(Slovakia) Jana Čepelová	#78	Loss	4–6, 4–6
Mutua Madrid Open; Madrid, Spain; WTA Premier Mandatory; Clay, outdoor 2–11 May 2014	763	1R	(Switzerland) Belinda Bencic	#98	Win	6–2, 6–1
Mutua Madrid Open; Madrid, Spain; WTA Premier Mandatory; Clay, outdoor 2–11 May 2014	764	2R	(China) Peng Shuai	#42	Win	6–2, 6–3
Mutua Madrid Open; Madrid, Spain; WTA Premier Mandatory; Clay, outdoor 2–11 May 2014	765	3R	(Spain) Carla Suárez Navarro	#15	Win	6–2, 6–3
Mutua Madrid Open; Madrid, Spain; WTA Premier Mandatory; Clay, outdoor 2–11 May 2014	-	QF	(Czech Republic) Petra Kvitová	#6	Withdrew	N/A
Internazionali BNL d'Italia; Rome, Itay; WTA Premier 5 Clay, outdoor 12–18 May 2014	-	1R	Bye			
Internazionali BNL d'Italia; Rome, Itay; WTA Premier 5 Clay, outdoor 12–18 May 2014	766	2R	(Germany) Andrea Petkovic	#28	Win	6–2, 6–2
Internazionali BNL d'Italia; Rome, Itay; WTA Premier 5 Clay, outdoor 12–18 May 2014	767	3R	(United States) Varvara Lepchenko	#49	Win	6–1, 6–2
Internazionali BNL d'Italia; Rome, Itay; WTA Premier 5 Clay, outdoor 12–18 May 2014	768	QF	(China) Zhang Shuai	#43	Win	6–1, 6–3
Internazionali BNL d'Italia; Rome, Itay; WTA Premier 5 Clay, outdoor 12–18 May 2014	769	SF	(Serbia) Ana Ivanovic	#13	Win	6–1, 3–6, 6–1
Internazionali BNL d'Italia; Rome, Itay; WTA Premier 5 Clay, outdoor 12–18 May 2014	770	F	(Italy) Sara Errani	#11	Win (3)	6–3, 6–0
French Open; Paris, France; Grand Slam; Clay, outdoor 25 May – 7 June 2014	771	1R	(France) Alizé Lim	#138	Win	6–2, 6–1
French Open; Paris, France; Grand Slam; Clay, outdoor 25 May – 7 June 2014	772	2R	(Spain) Garbiñe Muguruza	#37	Loss	2–6, 2–6
Wimbledon Championships; London, United Kingdom; Grand Slam; Grass, outdoor 23 June – 6 July 2014	773	1R	(United States) Anna Tatishvili	#113	Win	6–1, 6–2
Wimbledon Championships; London, United Kingdom; Grand Slam; Grass, outdoor 23 June – 6 July 2014	774	2R	(South Africa) Chanelle Scheepers	#94	Win	6–1, 6–1
Wimbledon Championships; London, United Kingdom; Grand Slam; Grass, outdoor 23 June – 6 July 2014	775	3R	(France) Alizé Cornet	#25	Loss	6–1, 3–6, 4–6
Bank of the West Classic; Stanford, United States; WTA Premier; Hard, outdoor 28 July – 3 August 2014	-	1R	Bye			
Bank of the West Classic; Stanford, United States; WTA Premier; Hard, outdoor 28 July – 3 August 2014	776	2R	(Czech Republic) Karolína Plíšková	#45	Win	7–5, 6–2
Bank of the West Classic; Stanford, United States; WTA Premier; Hard, outdoor 28 July – 3 August 2014	777	QF	(Serbia) Ana Ivanovic	#11	Win	2–6, 6–3, 7–5
Bank of the West Classic; Stanford, United States; WTA Premier; Hard, outdoor 28 July – 3 August 2014	778	SF	(Germany) Andrea Petkovic	#18	Win	7–5, 6–0
Bank of the West Classic; Stanford, United States; WTA Premier; Hard, outdoor 28 July – 3 August 2014	779	F	(Germany) Angelique Kerber	#8	Win (4)	7–6^{(7–1)}, 6-3
Rogers Cup; Montreal, Canada; WTA Premier 5 Hard, outdoor 4–10 August 2014	-	1R	Bye			
Rogers Cup; Montreal, Canada; WTA Premier 5 Hard, outdoor 4–10 August 2014	780	2R	(Australia) Samantha Stosur	#21	Win	6–0, 6–2
Rogers Cup; Montreal, Canada; WTA Premier 5 Hard, outdoor 4–10 August 2014	781	3R	(Czech Republic) Lucie Šafářová	#15	Win	7–5, 6–4
Rogers Cup; Montreal, Canada; WTA Premier 5 Hard, outdoor 4–10 August 2014	782	QF	(Denmark) Caroline Wozniacki	#13	Win	4–6, 7–5, 7–5
Rogers Cup; Montreal, Canada; WTA Premier 5 Hard, outdoor 4–10 August 2014	783	SF	(United States) Venus Williams	#26	Loss	7–6^{(7–2)}, 2–6, 3–6
Western & Southern Open; Cincinnati, USA; WTA Premier 5 Hard, outdoor 11–17 August 2014	-	1R	Bye			
Western & Southern Open; Cincinnati, USA; WTA Premier 5 Hard, outdoor 11–17 August 2014	784	2R	(Australia) Samantha Stosur	#22	Win	7–6^{(9–7)}, 7–6^{(9–7)}
Western & Southern Open; Cincinnati, USA; WTA Premier 5 Hard, outdoor 11–17 August 2014	785	3R	(Italy) Flavia Pennetta	#14	Win	6–2, 6–2
Western & Southern Open; Cincinnati, USA; WTA Premier 5 Hard, outdoor 11–17 August 2014	786	QF	(Serbia) Jelena Janković	#9	Win	6–1, 6–3
Western & Southern Open; Cincinnati, USA; WTA Premier 5 Hard, outdoor 11–17 August 2014	787	SF	(Denmark) Caroline Wozniacki	#12	Win	2–6, 6–2, 6–4
Western & Southern Open; Cincinnati, USA; WTA Premier 5 Hard, outdoor 11–17 August 2014	788	F	(Serbia) Ana Ivanovic	#11	Win (5)	6–4, 6–1
US Open; New York City, United States; Grand Slam; Hard, outdoor 25 August – 8 September 2014	789	1R	(United States) Taylor Townsend	#103	Win	6–3, 6–1
US Open; New York City, United States; Grand Slam; Hard, outdoor 25 August – 8 September 2014	790	2R	(United States) Vania King	#81	Win	6–1, 6–0
US Open; New York City, United States; Grand Slam; Hard, outdoor 25 August – 8 September 2014	791	3R	(United States) Varvara Lepchenko	#52	Win	6–3, 6–3
US Open; New York City, United States; Grand Slam; Hard, outdoor 25 August – 8 September 2014	792	4R	(Estonia) Kaia Kanepi	#50	Win	6–3, 6–3
US Open; New York City, United States; Grand Slam; Hard, outdoor 25 August – 8 September 2014	793	QF	(Italy) Flavia Pennetta	#12	Win	6–3, 6–2
US Open; New York City, United States; Grand Slam; Hard, outdoor 25 August – 8 September 2014	794	SF	(Russia) Ekaterina Makarova	#18	Win	6–1, 6–3
US Open; New York City, United States; Grand Slam; Hard, outdoor 25 August – 8 September 2014	795	F	(Denmark) Caroline Wozniacki	#11	Win (6)	6–3, 6–3
Wuhan Open; Wuhan, China; WTA Premier 5 Hard, outdoor 21–27 September 2014	-	1R	Bye			
Wuhan Open; Wuhan, China; WTA Premier 5 Hard, outdoor 21–27 September 2014	796	2R	(France) Alizé Cornet	#21	Loss	6–5, ret.
China Open; Beijing, China; WTA Premier Mandatory; Hard, outdoor 29 September – 5 October 2014	797	1R	(Spain) Sílvia Soler Espinosa	#70	Win	7–5, 6–2
China Open; Beijing, China; WTA Premier Mandatory; Hard, outdoor 29 September – 5 October 2014	798	2R	(Bulgaria) Tsvetana Pironkova	#51	Win	6–2, 6–3
China Open; Beijing, China; WTA Premier Mandatory; Hard, outdoor 29 September – 5 October 2014	799	3R	(Czech Republic) Lucie Šafářová	#15	Win	6–1, 1–6, 6–2
China Open; Beijing, China; WTA Premier Mandatory; Hard, outdoor 29 September – 5 October 2014	-	QF	(Australia) Samantha Stosur	#21	Withdrew	N/A
WTA Finals; Singapore, Singapore; Year-End Championship; Hard, indoor 17–26 October 2014	800	RR	(Serbia) Ana Ivanovic	#7	Win	6–4, 6–4
WTA Finals; Singapore, Singapore; Year-End Championship; Hard, indoor 17–26 October 2014	801	RR	(Romania) Simona Halep	#4	Loss	0–6, 2–6
WTA Finals; Singapore, Singapore; Year-End Championship; Hard, indoor 17–26 October 2014	802	RR	(Canada) Eugenie Bouchard	#5	Win	6–1, 6–1
WTA Finals; Singapore, Singapore; Year-End Championship; Hard, indoor 17–26 October 2014	803	SF	(Denmark) Caroline Wozniacki	#8	Win	2–6, 6–3, 7–6^{(8–6)}
WTA Finals; Singapore, Singapore; Year-End Championship; Hard, indoor 17–26 October 2014	804	F	(Romania) Simona Halep	#4	Win (7)	6–3, 6–0

=== Doubles matches ===
Tournament	Match	Round	Partner	Opponents	Rank	Result	Score
Australian Open; Melbourne, Australia; Grand Slam; Hard, outdoor 13–26 January 2014	–	1R	(United States) Venus Williams	(France) Kristina Mladenovic (Italy) Flavia Pennetta	#19 #33	Withdrew	N/A
Dubai Duty Free Tennis Championships; Dubai, United Arabic Emirates; WTA Premier; Hard, outdoor 17–22 February 2014	198	1R	(United States) Venus Williams	(Russia) Ekaterina Makarova (Russia) Elena Vesnina	#4 #3	Loss	4–6, 6–4, 6–7^{(4–10)}
Wimbledon Championships; London, United Kingdom; Grand Slam; Grass, outdoor 23 June – 6 July 2014	199	1R	(United States) Venus Williams	(Georgia (country)) Oksana Kalashnikova (Ukraine) Olga Savchuk	#54 #61	Win	5–7, 6–1, 6–4
Wimbledon Championships; London, United Kingdom; Grand Slam; Grass, outdoor 23 June – 6 July 2014	200	2R	(United States) Venus Williams	(Germany) Kristina Barrois (Switzerland) Stefanie Vögele	#70 #233	Loss	0–3 ret.
US Open; New York City, United States; Grand Slam; Hard, outdoor 25 August – 8 September 2014	201	1R	(United States) Venus Williams	(Hungary) Tímea Babos (France) Kristina Mladenovic	#16 #13	Win	7–6^{(7–0)}, 6–7^{(4–7)}, 6–1
US Open; New York City, United States; Grand Slam; Hard, outdoor 25 August – 8 September 2014	202	2R	(United States) Venus Williams	(Georgia (country)) Oksana Kalashnikova (Ukraine) Olga Savchuk	#71 #65	Win	6–2 6–1
US Open; New York City, United States; Grand Slam; Hard, outdoor 25 August – 8 September 2014	203	3R	(United States) Venus Williams	(Spain) Garbiñe Muguruza (Spain) Carla Suárez Navarro	#21 #26	Win	6–1 6–0
US Open; New York City, United States; Grand Slam; Hard, outdoor 25 August – 8 September 2014	204	QF	(United States) Venus Williams	(Russia) Ekaterina Makarova (Russia) Elena Vesnina	#9 #8	Loss	6–7^{(5–7)}, 4–6

== Tournament schedule ==
=== Singles schedule ===
Williams' 2014 singles tournament schedule is as follows:

Date	Championship	Location	Category	Surface	Points	Outcome
30 December 2013 – 4 January 2014	Brisbane International	Brisbane	WTA Premier	Hard	470	Winner defeated (Belarus) V Azarenka, 6–4, 7–5
13 January – 26 January	Australian Open	Melbourne	Grand Slam	Hard	240	Fourth Round lost to (Serbia) A Ivanovic, 6–4, 3–6, 3–6
10 February – 16 February	Qatar Open	Doha	WTA Premier 5	Hard	0	Withdrew due to back injury
17 February – 22 February	Dubai Tennis Championships	Dubai	WTA Premier	Hard	185	Semifinal lost to (France) A Cornet, 4–6, 4–6
17 March – 30 March	Miami Masters	Miami	WTA Premier Mandatory	Hard	1000	Winner defeated (China) N Li, 7–5, 6–1
31 March – 6 April	Family Circle Cup	Charleston	WTA Premier	Clay (green)	1	Second Round lost to (Serbia) J Čepelová 4–6, 4–6
2 May – 11 May	Madrid Open	Madrid	WTA Premier Mandatory	Clay	215	Quarterfinals; Withdrew before match against (Czech Republic) P Kvitová
12 May – 18 May	Italian Open	Rome	WTA Premier 5	Clay	900	Winner defeated (Italy) S Errani, 6–3, 6–0
25 May – 7 June	French Open	Paris	Grand Slam	Clay	70	Second Round lost to (Spain) G Muguruza 2–6, 2–6
23 June 2014– 6 July 2014	Wimbledon	London	Grand Slam	Grass	130	Third Round lost to (France) A Cornet 6–1, 3–6, 4–6
26 July – 3 August	Stanford Classic	Stanford	WTA Premier	Hard	470	Winner defeated (Germany) A Kerber, 7-6^{(7–1)}, 6–3
4 August – 10 August	Canadian Open	Montreal	WTA Premier 5	Hard	350	Semifinal lost to (United States) V Williams, 7–6^{(7–2)}, 2–6, 3–6
11 August – 17 August	Cincinnati Masters	Cincinnati	WTA Premier 5	Hard	900	Winner defeated (Serbia) A Ivanovic, 6–4, 6–1
25 August – 8 September	US Open	New York	Grand Slam	Hard	2000	Winner defeated (Denmark) C Wozniacki, 6–3, 6–3
22 September – 28 September	Wuhan Open	Wuhan	WTA Premier 5	Hard	1	Second Round retired to (France) A Cornet 6–5
29 September – 5 October	China Open	Beijing	WTA Premier Mandatory	Hard	215	Quarterfinals; Withdrew before match against (Australia) S Stosur
17 October – 26 October	WTA Tour Championships	Singapore	Year-End Championships	Hard (i)	1340	Winner defeated (Romania) S Halep, 6–3, 6–0
Total year-end points					8487	

=== Doubles schedule ===
Williams' 2014 doubles tournament schedule is as follows:

Date	Championship	Location	Category	Surface	Points	Outcome
13 January – 26 January	Australian Open	Melbourne	Grand Slam	Hard	0	Withdrew before match against (France) K Mladenovic/ (Italy) F Pennetta
17 February – 22 February	Dubai Tennis Championships	Dubai	WTA Premier	Hard	1	First Round lost to (Russia) E Makarova/ (Russia) E Vesnina; 4–6, 6–4, [4–10]
23 June – 6 July	Wimbledon Championships	London	Grand Slam	Grass	5	Second Round lost to (Switzerland) S Vögele/ (Germany) K Barrois^{r}0–3
25 August – 7 September	US Open	New York	Grand Slam	Hard	430	Quarterfinal round lost to (Russia) E Makarova/ (Russia) E Vesnina; 6–7^{(5–7)}, 4–6
Total year-end points					436	Partner: (United States) Venus Williams

== Yearly records ==
=== Head-to-head matchups ===
Ordered by percentage of wins

- (Denmark) Caroline Wozniacki 4–0
- (Germany) Andrea Petkovic 3–0
- (Russia) Maria Sharapova 2–0
- (Germany) Angelique Kerber 2–0
- (Australia) Samantha Stosur 2–0
- (Serbia) Jelena Janković 2–0
- (United States) Varvara Lepchenko 2–0
- (Italy) Flavia Pennetta 2–0
- (Czech Republic) Lucie Šafářová 2–0
- (Russia) Ekaterina Makarova 2–0
- (Belarus) Victoria Azarenka 1–0
- (Australia) Ashleigh Barty 1–0
- (Slovakia) Dominika Cibulková 1–0
- (Canada) Eugenie Bouchard 1–0
- (Serbia) Vesna Dolonc 1–0
- (Italy) Sara Errani 1–0
- (France) Caroline Garcia 1–0
- (South Africa) Chanelle Scheepers 1–0
- (Czech Republic) Karolína Plíšková 1–0
- (Switzerland) Belinda Bencic 1–0
- (Slovakia) Daniela Hantuchová 1–0
- (China) Li Na 1–0
- (Spain) Carla Suárez Navarro 1–0
- (United States) Anna Tatishvili 1–0
- (France) Alizé Lim 1–0
- (Kazakhstan) Yaroslava Shvedova 1–0
- (Spain) Silvia Soler Espinosa 1–0
- (China) Peng Shuai 1–0
- (United States) Coco Vandeweghe 1–0
- (China) Shuai Zhang 1–0
- (Bulgaria) Tsvetana Pironkova 1–0
- (United States) Taylor Townsend 1–0
- (United States) Vania King 1–0
- (Estonia) Kaia Kanepi 1−0
- (Serbia) Ana Ivanovic 4–1
- (Romania) Simona Halep 1–1
- (United States) Venus Williams 0–1
- (Slovakia) Jana Čepelová 0–1
- (Spain) Garbiñe Muguruza 0–1
- (France) Alizé Cornet 0–3

=== Finals ===
==== Singles: 7 (7–0) ====
Legend Grand Slams (1–0) WTA Tour Championships (1–0) WTA Premier Mandatory (1–0) WTA Premier 5 (2–0) WTA Premier (2–0) WTA International (0–0)	Finals by surface Hard (6–0) Clay (1–0)	Finals by venue Outdoors (6–0) Indoors (1–0)

Outcome	No.	Date	Tournament	Surface	Opponent in the final	Score in the final
Winner	58.	January 4, 2014	Brisbane International, Australia (2)	Hard	(Belarus) Victoria Azarenka	6–4, 7–5
Winner	59.	March 29, 2014	Miami Masters, USA (7)	Hard	(China) Li Na	7–5, 6–1
Winner	60.	May 18, 2014	Italian Open, Italy (3)	Clay (red)	(Italy) Sara Errani	6–3, 6–0
Winner	61.	August 3, 2014	Stanford Classic, USA (3)	Hard	(Germany) Angelique Kerber	7–6^{(7–1)}, 6–3
Winner	62.	August 17, 2014	Cincinnati Masters, USA	Hard	(Serbia) Ana Ivanovic	6–4, 6–1
Winner	63.	September 7, 2014	US Open, New York City, US (6)	Hard	(Denmark) Caroline Wozniacki	6–3, 6–3
Winner	64.	October 26, 2014	WTA Tour Championships, Singapore (5)	Hard (i)	(Romania) Simona Halep	6–3, 6–0

=== Earnings ===
#	Event	Prize money	Year-to-date
1	Brisbane International	$196,670	$196,670
2	Australian Open	$119,683	$316,353
3	Dubai Tennis Championships (singles)	$135,064	$451,417
3	Dubai Tennis Championships (doubles)	$2,868	$454,285
4	Sony Open Tennis	$787,000	$1,241,285
5	Family Circle Cup	$4,300	$1,245,585
6	Mutua Madrid Open	$117,719	$1,363,304
7	Internazionali BNL d'Italia	$480,041	$1,843,345
8	French Open	$55,359	$1,898,704
9	Wimbledon (singles)	$110,667	$2,009,371
9	Wimbledon (doubles)	$10,137	$2,019,508
10	Bank of the West Classic	$120,000	$2,139,508
11	Rogers Cup	$107,400	$2,246,908
12	Western & Southern Open	$467,300	$2,714,208
13	US Open (singles)	$2,952,946	$5,667,154
13	US Open Series bonus pool	$1,000,000	$6,667,154
13	US Open (doubles)	$30,544	$6,697,698
14	Wuhan Open	$12,900	$6,710,598
15	China Open	$109,700	$6,820,298
16	WTA Finals	$2,047,000	$8,867,298
Bonus Pool		$450,000	$9,317,298
			$9,317,298

Figures in United States dollars (USD) unless noted.

== See also ==
- 2014 Venus Williams tennis season
- 2014 Li Na tennis season
- 2014 Maria Sharapova tennis season
- 2014 WTA Tour
- Serena Williams career statistics

Sporting positions
Preceded by Venus Williams; Angelique Kerber	World No. 1 First stint: July 8, 2002 – August 10, 2003; Last stint: April 24, 2017 – May 14, 2017	Succeeded by Kim Clijsters; Angelique Kerber
Preceded by Jennifer Capriati; Justine Henin; Petra Kvitová	Year-end World No. 1; 2002; 2008, 2009; 2012 – 2015	Succeeded by Justine Henin; Kim Clijsters; Angelique Kerber
Awards
Preceded by Jennifer Capriati; Jelena Janković; Petra Kvitová	ITF Women's Singles World Champion; 2002; 2009; 2012 – 2015	Succeeded by Justine Henin; Caroline Wozniacki; Angelique Kerber
Preceded by Martina Hingis & Anna Kournikova; Cara Black & Liezel Huber	WTA Doubles Team of the Year; 2000 (with Venus Williams); 2009 (with Venus Williams)	Succeeded by Lisa Raymond & Rennae Stubbs; Gisela Dulko & Flavia Pennetta
Preceded by Cara Black & Liezel Huber	ITF Women's Doubles World Champion; 2009 (with Venus Williams)	Succeeded by Gisela Dulko & Flavia Pennetta
