= 2014 BRD Bucharest Open – Singles =

Singles
- 2014 BRD Bucharest Open

Final
- Champion: (Romania) Simona Halep
- Runner-up: (Italy) Roberta Vinci
- Score: 6–1, 6–3

Details
- Draw: 32
- Seeds: 8

Events
Singles	Doubles
- BRD Bucharest Open

Simona Halep won the first edition of the tournament, defeating Roberta Vinci in the final, 6–1, 6–3.

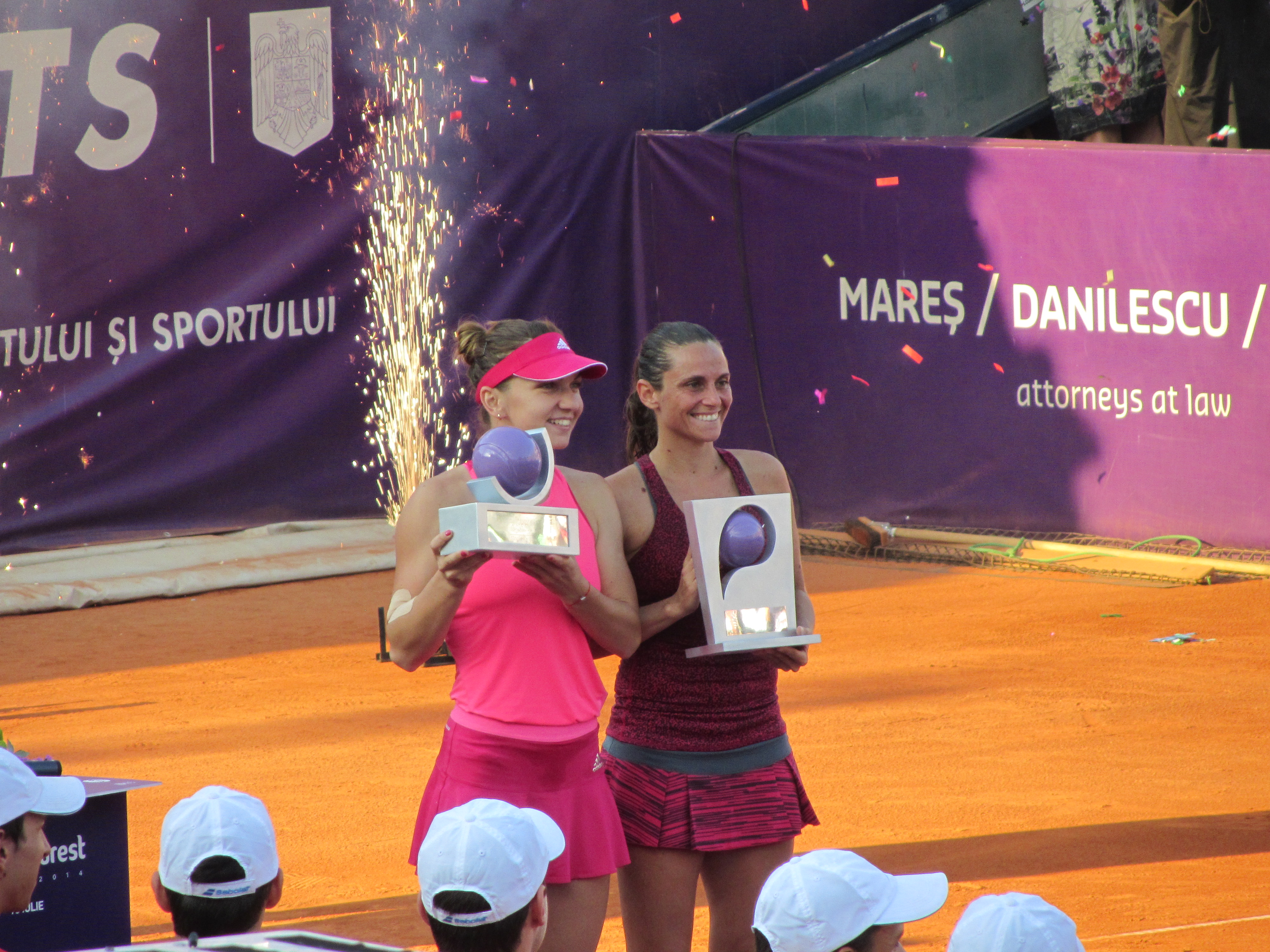
Simona Halep (left) and Roberta Vinci holding their first and second-place trophies respectively

== Seeds ==
1. (Romania) Simona Halep (champion)
2. (Italy) Roberta Vinci (final)
3. (Czech Republic) Klára Koukalová (first round)
4. (Italy) Karin Knapp (second round)
5. (Germany) Annika Beck (first round)
6. (Slovakia) Anna Schmiedlová (first round)
7. (Czech Republic) Petra Cetkovská (quarterfinals)
8. (Slovenia) Polona Hercog (quarterfinals)

== Draw ==
Key

- Q = Qualifier
- WC = Wild card
- LL = Lucky loser
- Alt = Alternate
- ITF = ITF entry
- PR = Protected ranking
- SR = Special ranking
- SE = Special exempt
- JE = Junior exempt
- JR = Junior Accelerator Programme entrant
- CO = College Accelerator Programme entrant
- NG = Next Gen Accelerator Program entrant
- w/o = Walkover
- r = Retired
- d = Defaulted

=== Finals ===
Semifinals
1	(Romania) Simona Halep	6	4	6
(Romania) Monica Niculescu	2	6	1
(Slovakia) Kristína Kučová	1	3
2	(Italy) Roberta Vinci	6	6

Final
1	(Romania) Simona Halep	6	6
2	(Italy) Roberta Vinci	1	3

=== Top half ===
First round
1	(Romania) S Halep	6	6
LL	(Netherlands) I de Vroome	0	4
(Serbia) A Krunić	4	6	6
(Russia) A Panova	6	3	1
(Paraguay) V Cepede Royg	2	3
(Turkey) Ç Büyükakçay	6	6
(Spain) L Arruabarrena	4	6	7^{7}
5	(Germany) A Beck	6	2	6^{5}
3	(Czech Republic) K Koukalová	3	0
(Romania) M Niculescu	6	6
(France) A Lim	6	4	5
Q	(Bulgaria) E Kostova	3	6	7
(Poland) K Piter	6	1	7^{7}
WC	(Romania) A Mitu	0	6	6^{5}
(United States) A Tatishvili	4	3
8	(Slovenia) P Hercog	6	6

Second round
1	(Romania) S Halep	6	6
(Serbia) A Krunić	2	4
(Turkey) Ç Büyükakçay	5	6	6^{6}
(Spain) L Arruabarrena	7	3	7^{8}
(Romania) M Niculescu	7	7
Q	(Bulgaria) E Kostova	5	5
(Poland) K Piter	2	7	6^{4}
8	(Slovenia) P Hercog	6	5	7^{7}

Quarterfinals
1	(Romania) S Halep	6	6
(Spain) L Arruabarrena	3	1
(Romania) M Niculescu	6	2	7^{7}
8	(Slovenia) P Hercog	2	6	6^{3}

Semifinals
1	(Romania) S Halep	6	4	6
(Romania) M Niculescu	2	6	1

=== Bottom half ===
First round
6	(Slovakia) A Schmiedlová	3	3
(Slovakia) K Kučová	6	6
(Ukraine) N Kichenok	0	3
WC	(Romania) C Dinu	6	6
Q	(Estonia) A Kontaveit	1	4
(Montenegro) D Kovinić	6	6
WC	(Romania) R Olaru	1	3
4	(Italy) K Knapp	6	6
7	(Czech Republic) P Cetkovská	6	6
(Romania) A Cadanțu	3	2
Q	(Netherlands) K Bertens	6	3	6
(Romania) I-C Begu	0	6	2
(Spain) S Soler Espinosa	6	6
Q	(Kazakhstan) S Karatantcheva	2	1
(Romania) A Dulgheru	2	3
2	(Italy) R Vinci	6	6

Second round
(Slovakia) K Kučová	6	6
WC	(Romania) C Dinu	2	3
(Montenegro) D Kovinić	6	2	6
4	(Italy) K Knapp	4	6	3
7	(Czech Republic) P Cetkovská	6	3	7^{7}
Q	(Netherlands) K Bertens	4	6	6^{4}
(Spain) S Soler Espinosa	6	2	1
2	(Italy) R Vinci	3	6	6

Quarterfinals
(Slovakia) K Kučová	6	1	6
(Montenegro) D Kovinić	4	6	3
7	(Czech Republic) P Cetkovská	5	3
2	(Italy) R Vinci	7	6

Semifinals
(Slovakia) K Kučová	1	3
2	(Italy) R Vinci	6	6

== Qualifying ==
=== Seeds ===
1. (Netherlands) Kiki Bertens (qualified)
2. (Austria) Tamira Paszek (second round, retired)
3. (Kazakhstan) Sesil Karatantcheva (qualified)
4. (Czech Republic) Renata Voráčová (first round)
5. (Estonia) Anett Kontaveit (qualified)
6. (Poland) Paula Kania (first round)
7. (Italy) Alberta Brianti (first round)
8. (Netherlands) Indy de Vroome (qualifying competition, lucky loser)

=== Qualifiers ===
1. (Netherlands) Kiki Bertens
2. (Bulgaria) Elitsa Kostova
3. (Kazakhstan) Sesil Karatantcheva
4. (Estonia) Anett Kontaveit

=== Lucky losers ===
1. (Netherlands) Indy de Vroome

=== Draw ===
==== First qualifier ====
First round
1	(Netherlands) Kiki Bertens	6	6
WC	(Romania) Elena Bogdan	2	2
(Chile) Daniela Seguel	6	6
WC	(Romania) Cristina Ene	4	2
(Ukraine) Olga Savchuk	6	5	6
WC	(Romania) Georgia Crăciun	2	7	2
(Kazakhstan) Yulia Putintseva	6	6
7	(Italy) Alberta Brianti	4	2

Second round
1	(Netherlands) Kiki Bertens	6	7
(Chile) Daniela Seguel	3	5
(Ukraine) Olga Savchuk	0	1
(Kazakhstan) Yulia Putintseva	6	6

Qualifying competition
1	(Netherlands) Kiki Bertens	7	6
(Kazakhstan) Yulia Putintseva	5	4

==== Second qualifier ====
First round
2	(Austria) Tamira Paszek	6	6
WC	(Hungary) Ágnes Bukta	0	1
(Poland) Katarzyna Kawa	2	2
WC	(Hungary) Vanda Lukács	6	6
(Bulgaria) Elitsa Kostova	6	6
(Russia) Valeria Solovyeva	3	1
(Czech Republic) Denisa Allertová	7	6
6	(Poland) Paula Kania	5	3

Second round
2	(Austria) Tamira Paszek	6	0	0^{r}
WC	(Hungary) Vanda Lukács	3	6	4
(Bulgaria) Elitsa Kostova	6^{4}	6	6
(Czech Republic) Denisa Allertová	7^{7}	3	3

Qualifying competition
WC	(Hungary) Vanda Lukács	3	5
(Bulgaria) Elitsa Kostova	6	7

==== Third qualifier ====
First round
3	(Kazakhstan) Sesil Karatantcheva	6	7^{8}
(Russia) Polina Vinogradova	2	6^{6}
(United States) Julia Cohen	5	6	6^{4}
(Hungary) Réka-Luca Jani	7	3	7^{7}
WC	(Romania) Ioana Loredana Roșca	2	7^{7}	5
(Norway) Ulrikke Eikeri	6	6^{3}	7
(Romania) Patricia Maria Țig	0	1
8	(Netherlands) Indy de Vroome	6	6

Second round
3	(Kazakhstan) Sesil Karatantcheva	6	7^{7}
(Hungary) Réka-Luca Jani	3	6^{3}
(Norway) Ulrikke Eikeri	2	1
8	(Netherlands) Indy de Vroome	6	6

Qualifying competition
3	(Kazakhstan) Sesil Karatantcheva	7	6
8	(Netherlands) Indy de Vroome	5	2

==== Fourth qualifier ====
First round
4	(Czech Republic) Renata Voráčová	3	5
(Italy) Anastasia Grymalska	6	7
WC	(Bulgaria) Aleksandrina Naydenova	2	6	6
WC	(Romania) Ioana Ducu	6	3	3
(Croatia) Tereza Mrdeža	6	7
(Ukraine) Veronica Kapshay	1	5
(Portugal) Maria João Koehler	3	1
5	(Estonia) Anett Kontaveit	6	6

Second round
(Italy) Anastasia Grymalska	6	6
WC	(Bulgaria) Aleksandrina Naydenova	1	0
(Croatia) Tereza Mrdeža	6	3	2
5	(Estonia) Anett Kontaveit	1	6	6

Qualifying competition
(Italy) Anastasia Grymalska	4	4
5	(Estonia) Anett Kontaveit	6	6
