= 2014 WTA Finals – Doubles =

Doubles
- 2014 WTA Finals

Final
- Champion: (Zimbabwe) Cara Black (India) Sania Mirza
- Runner-up: (Chinese Taipei) Hsieh Su-wei (China) Peng Shuai
- Score: 6–1, 6–0

Details
- Draw: 8
- Seeds: 4

Events
Singles	Doubles
- WTA Finals

Cara Black and Sania Mirza defeated the defending champions Hsieh Su-wei and Peng Shuai in the final, 6–1, 6–0 to win the doubles tennis title at the 2014 WTA Finals.

== Seeds ==
1. (Italy) Sara Errani / (Italy) Roberta Vinci (quarterfinals, retired)
2. (Chinese Taipei) Hsieh Su-wei / (China) Peng Shuai (final)
3. (Zimbabwe) Cara Black / (India) Sania Mirza (champions)
4. (Russia) Ekaterina Makarova / (Russia) Elena Vesnina (quarterfinals)

== Draw ==
Key

- Q = Qualifier
- WC = Wild card
- LL = Lucky loser
- Alt = Alternate
- ITF = ITF entry
- PR = Protected ranking
- SR = Special ranking
- SE = Special exempt
- JE = Junior exempt
- JR = Junior Accelerator Programme entrant
- CO = College Accelerator Programme entrant
- NG = Next Gen Accelerator Program entrant
- w/o = Walkover
- r = Retired
- d = Defaulted

=== Finals ===
Quarterfinals
1	(Italy) Sara Errani (Italy) Roberta Vinci	1^{r}
(Czech Republic) Květa Peschke (Slovenia) Katarina Srebotnik	2
3	(Zimbabwe) Cara Black (India) Sania Mirza	6	2	[12]
(United States) Raquel Kops-Jones (United States) Abigail Spears	3	6	[10]
(Russia) Alla Kudryavtseva (Australia) Anastasia Rodionova	4	6	[10]
4	(Russia) Ekaterina Makarova (Russia) Elena Vesnina	6	2	[6]
(Spain) Garbiñe Muguruza (Spain) Carla Suárez Navarro	4	1
2	(Chinese Taipei) Hsieh Su-wei (China) Peng Shuai	6	6

Semifinals
(Czech Republic) Květa Peschke (Slovenia) Katarina Srebotnik	6	5	[9]
3	(Zimbabwe) Cara Black (India) Sania Mirza	4	7	[11]
(Russia) Alla Kudryavtseva (Australia) Anastasia Rodionova	1	4
2	(Chinese Taipei) Hsieh Su-wei (China) Peng Shuai	6	6

Final
3	(Zimbabwe) Cara Black (India) Sania Mirza	6	6
2	(Chinese Taipei) Hsieh Su-wei (China) Peng Shuai	1	0
