= 2014 WTA Finals =

- Date: 17–26 October
- Edition: 44th (singles) / 39th (doubles)
- Draw: 8S / 8D
- Prize money: $6,500,000
- Surface: Hard (indoor)
- Location: Singapore
- Venue: Singapore Indoor Stadium

Champions

Singles
- (United States) Serena Williams

Doubles
- (Zimbabwe) Cara Black / (India) Sania Mirza
← 2013 ·	WTA Finals	· 2015 →

The 2014 WTA Finals was a women's tennis tournament in Singapore from October 17 to October 26, 2014, and was the 44th edition of the singles event and the 39th edition of the doubles competition. The tournament was held at the Singapore Indoor Stadium, and contested by eight singles players and eight doubles teams. It was the Championships of 2014 WTA Tour.

== Finals ==
=== Singles ===
- (United States) Serena Williams defeated (Romania) Simona Halep, 6–3, 6–0.

=== Doubles ===
- (Zimbabwe) Cara Black / (India) Sania Mirza defeated (Chinese Taipei) Hsieh Su-wei / (China) Peng Shuai, 6–1, 6–0.

=== Exhibition ===
Rising Stars

- (Puerto Rico) Monica Puig defeated (China) Zheng Saisai, 6–4, 6–3.

Legends

- (France) Marion Bartoli

== Tournament ==
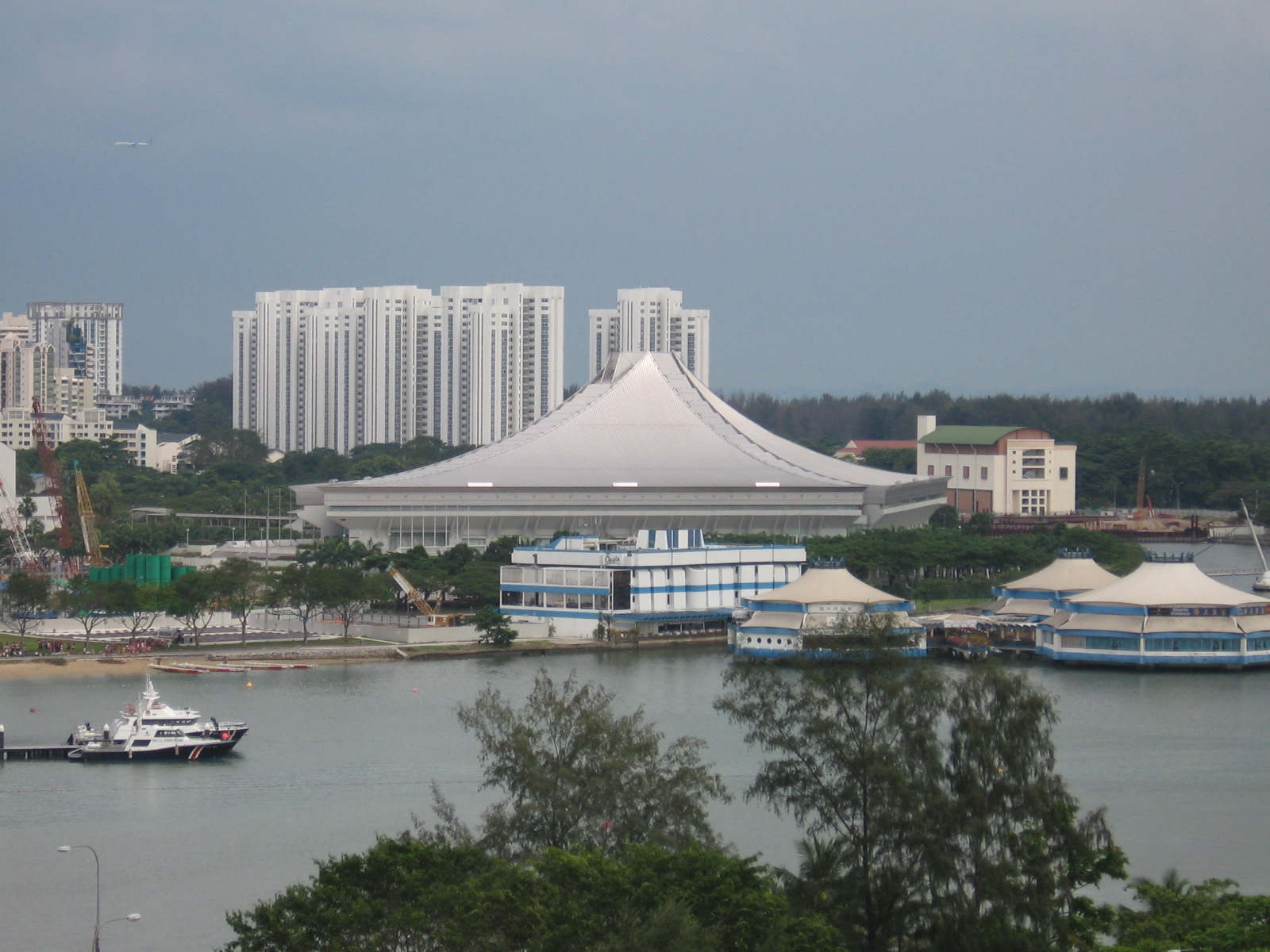
Singapore Indoor Stadium has hosted the WTA Finals for the first time in 2014.

The 2014 WTA Finals happened at the Singapore Indoor Stadium from 17 October to 26 October 2014, and is the 44th edition of the event. The tournament is run by the Women's Tennis Association (WTA) as part of the 2014 WTA Tour. Singapore is now the ninth city to host the WTA Finals since its inauguration in 1972 and will host the event for at least five years. The event will also hold two exhibition tournaments, WTA Rising Stars Invitational and the WTA Legends Event. The inaugural 2014 WTA Rising Stars Invitational will be held during the WTA Finals from October 17–21, 2014. Four singles players age 23 or under were chosen by fan vote from qualifying nominees, two from the Asia-Pacific region and two from the Rest of World region, will participate in Singapore: Zarina Diyas and Zheng Saisai, Asia-Pacific region; Monica Puig and Shelby Rogers, Rest of World region.

=== Qualifying ===
In singles, point totals are calculated by combining point totals from sixteen tournaments. Of these sixteen tournaments, a player's results from the four Grand Slam events, the four Premier Mandatory tournaments, and the best results from two Premier 5 tournaments must be included.
In doubles, point totals are calculated by any combination of eleven tournaments throughout the year. Unlike in singles, this combination does not need to include results from the Grand Slams or Premier-level tournaments.

=== Format ===
The singles event features eight players in a round robin event, split into two groups of four. Over the first four days of competition, each player meets the other three players in her group, with the top two in each group advancing to the semifinals. The first-placed player in one group meets the second-placed player in the other group, and vice versa. The winners of each semifinal meet in the championship match.

==== Round robin tie-breaking methods ====
The final standings of each group were determined by the first of the following methods that applied:

1. Greatest number of wins.
2. Greatest number of matches played.
3. Head-to-head results if only two players are tied, or if three players are tied then:

a. If three players each have the same number of wins, a player having played less than all three matches is automatically eliminated and the player advancing to the single elimination competition is the winner of the match-up of the two remaining tied players.
b. Highest percentage of sets won.
c. Highest percentage of games won.

== Prize money and points ==
The total prize money for the BNP Paribas 2014 WTA Finals was US$6,500,000.

Stage	Singles		Doubles	
Stage	Prize money	Points	Prize money	Points
Champion	RR^{1} + $1,658,000	RR + 810	$500,000	1500
Runner-up	RR + $582,000	RR + 360	$250,000	1050
Semifinalist	RR + $37,000	RR	$125,000	690
First round	—	—	$75,000	460
Round robin win per match	$143,000	160	—	—
Round robin per match played	$20,000	70	—	—
Participation Fee	$80,000	—	—	—
Alternates	$62,000	—	—	—

- ^{1} RR means prize money or points won in the round robin round.

== Qualified players ==
=== Singles ===
#	Players	Points	Tourn	Date Qualified
1	Serena Williams (USA)	7,146	17 (15)	5 September
2	Maria Sharapova (RUS)	6,680	15	9 September
3	Petra Kvitová (CZE)	5,597	18	27 September
4	Simona Halep (ROU)	5,403	19 (18)	15 September
5	Eugenie Bouchard (CAN)	4,523	22	2 October
6	Agnieszka Radwańska (POL)	4,441	20	2 October
7	Ana Ivanovic (SRB)	4,390	21	2 October
8	Caroline Wozniacki (DEN)	4,045	19	2 October

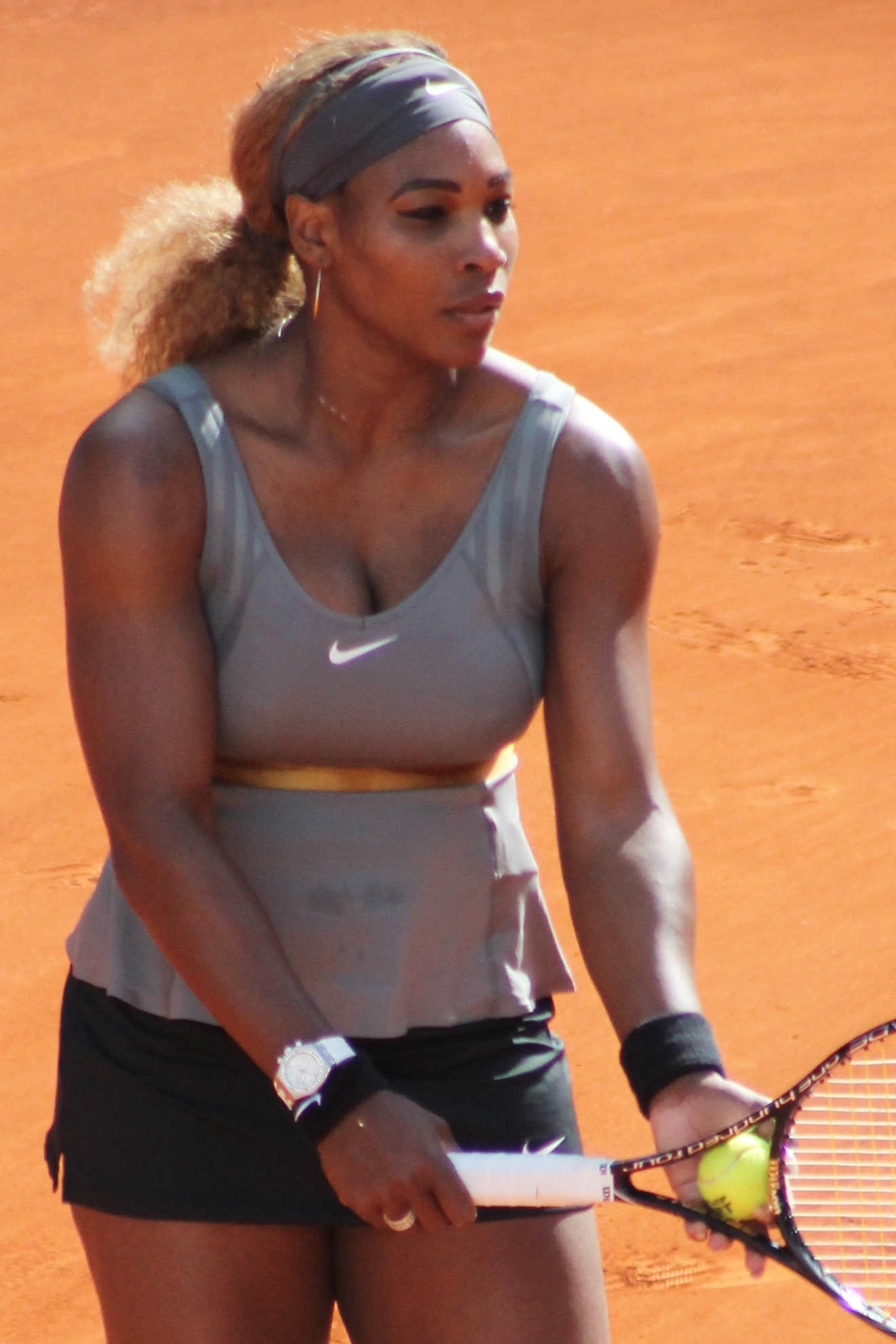
Serena Williams won her 18th major title in 2014.

On 5 September, Serena Williams became the first player to qualify for the Championships.

Following her 2013 season, Serena Williams won her 58th title in Brisbane, defeating the world no.2, Victoria Azarenka, in the final. She injured her back at the Australian Open and lost in the fourth round to Ana Ivanovic in three sets. She returned to competition in Dubai Tennis Championships but lost in the semifinals to Alizé Cornet. She successfully defended her Miami title, after defeating Li Na in the final. She lost in the second round of Charleston to Jana Čepelová and withdrew before her quarterfinals match in Madrid before defending her Rome title, defeating Sara Errani in the final. Coming as the defending champion of the French Open, she lost in the second round to Garbiñe Muguruza 2–6, 2–6, in her most lopsided slam loss in her career.

Following her disappointing loss in Paris, Williams returned to Wimbledon as the top seed. She reached the third round before losing to Cornet in three sets. She appeared sick in her following doubles match. She made a return in Bank of the West Classic where she won the title by defeating Angelique Kerber in the final. The following week, she lost to sister Venus for the first time since 2009 in the semifinals of Rogers Cup. She won her 62nd title the following week in Cincinnati, beating Ivanovic in the final, this marks her third time winning the US Open Series. After her disappointing results in the Major tournaments this year, she made the final of the US Open, where she qualified for the WTA Finals. In the final, she defeated Caroline Wozniacki in straight sets, thus winning her 18th Major singles title, tying the records of Chris Evert and Martina Navratilova.

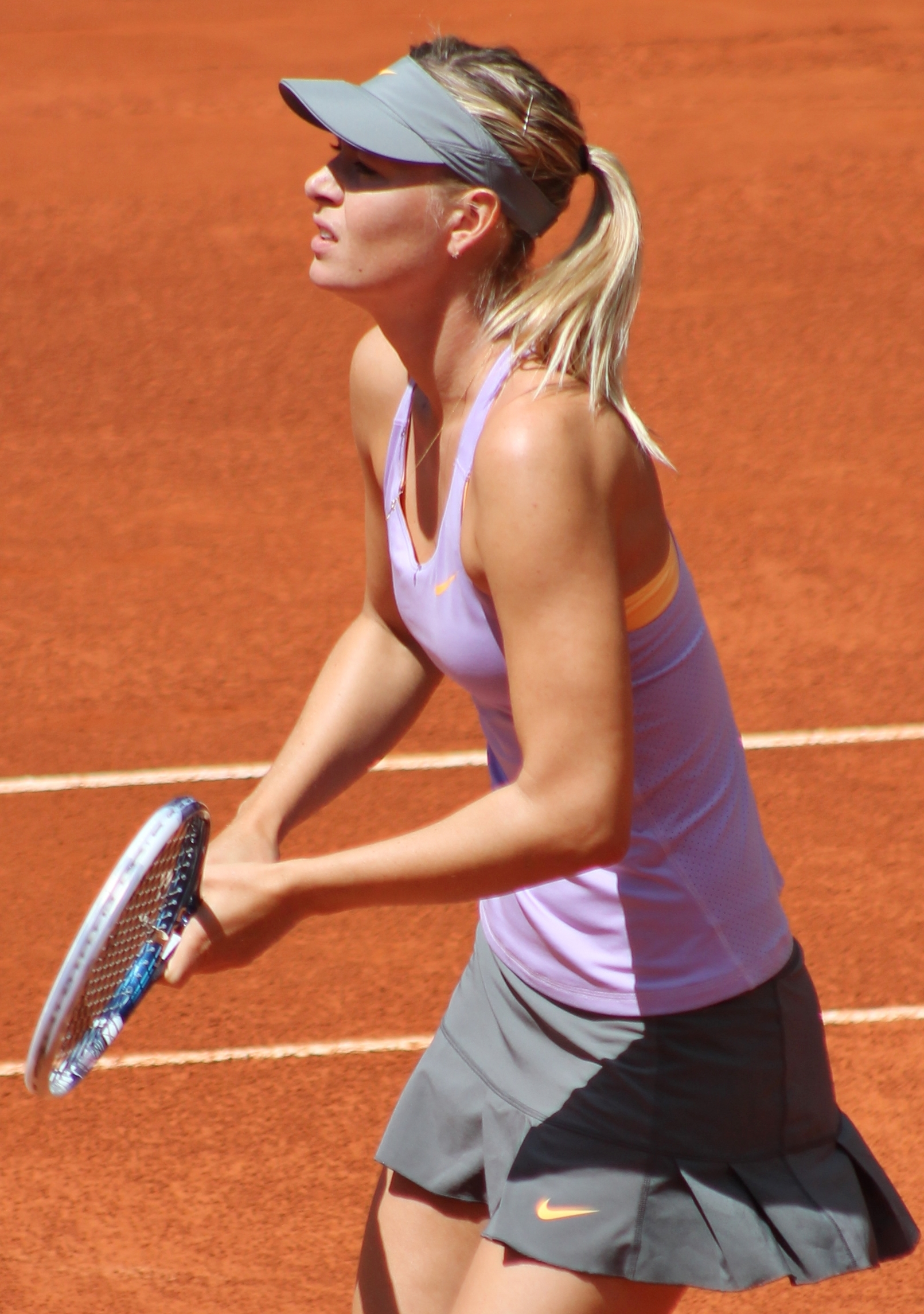
Maria Sharapova won her second French Open title.

On 9 September, Maria Sharapova became the second player to qualify for the championships.

After prematurely ending her 2013 season due to an injury, Maria Sharapova began 2014 at the 2014 Brisbane International where she lost to top seed Serena Williams in the semifinals. Then, she travelled to Melbourne to play the Australian Open as the 3rd seed, she managed to reach the 4th round where she lost to Slovak and eventual finalist Dominika Cibulková. In February, Sharapova played the Paris indoors tournament as the top seed, she lost to fellow Russian Anastasia Pavlyuchenkova in the semifinals. Sharapova kicked off her North American hardcourt season at Indian Wells as the defending champion. However, she was upset by Camila Giorgi in the third round in three sets. At the Sony Open Tennis, Sharapova lost to Serena in the semifinals again. During the clay court season, Sharapova enjoyed major success. She defended her title at Stuttgart defeating Ana Ivanovic in the final in a three-setter and won the Mutua Madrid Open, outplaying Simona Halep in three sets as well. She suffered her only loss on clay in 2014 at Rome when she fell to Ivanovic in the third round but she bounced back at the French Open by collecting her 5th Grand Slam title when she defeated Halep again in a match lasting over 3 hours, the second longest women's Grand Slam final in history. Sharapova suffered a fourth round loss at Wimbledon to Angelique Kerber. Sharapova began her 2014 US Open Series campaign at the Rogers Cup losing to Spaniard Carla Suárez Navarro in the third round. The following week at Western & Southern Open, she reached the semifinals before succumbing to Ivanovic again in three sets. At the US Open, Sharapova, seeded 5th, lost in the fourth round to Caroline Wozniacki. Sharapova won her first hard court title since Indian Wells 2013 at the China Open defeating Petra Kvitová in the final in three set.

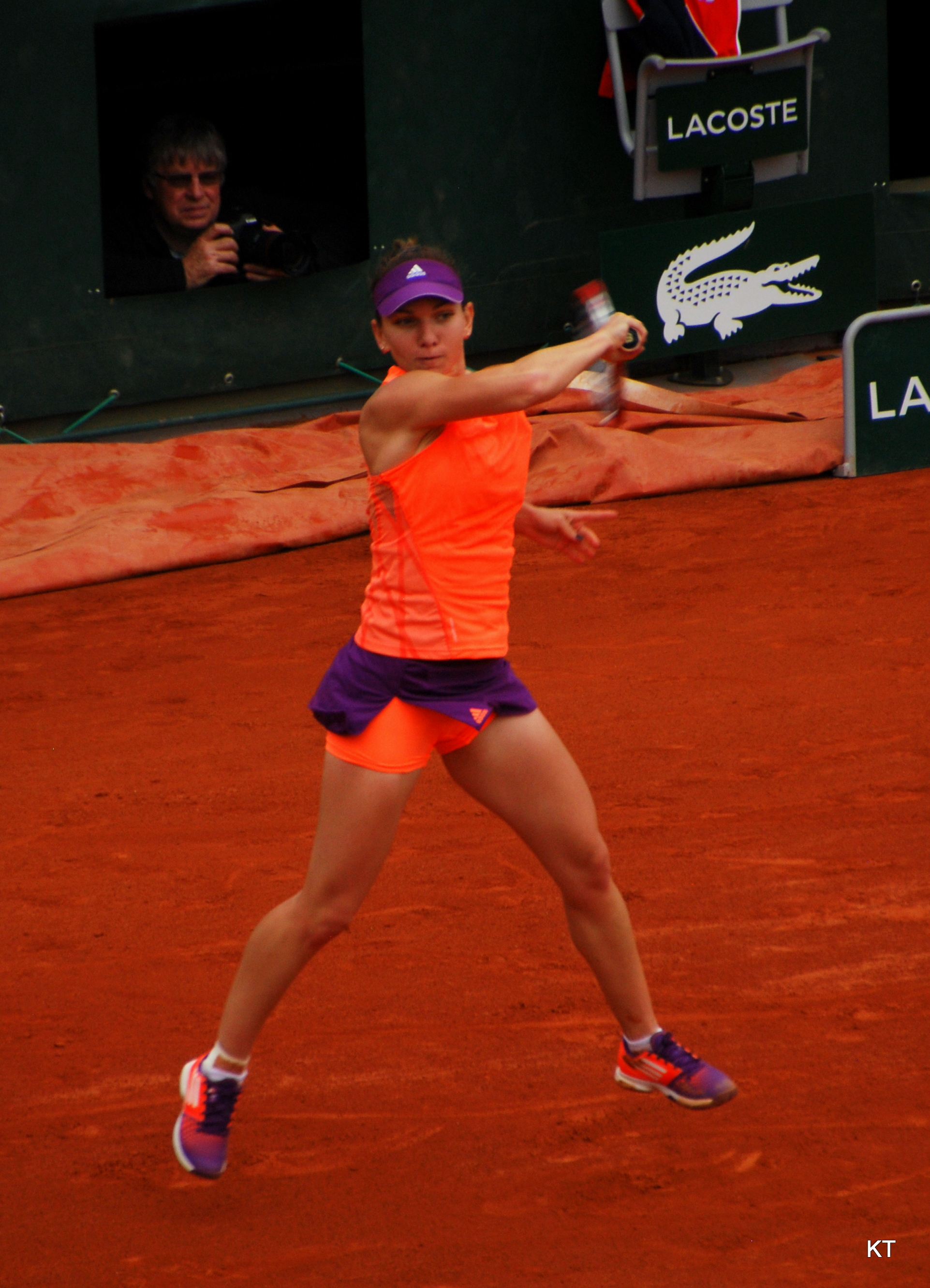
Simona Halep reached her first slam final at the French Open.

On 15 September, Simona Halep was announced as the third qualifier for the Championships.

Simona Halep enjoyed a breakthrough in 2013 where she won her first six WTA titles. She kicked off the 2014 season at the 2014 Brisbane International, she fell to Madison Keys in round 1. At the 2014 Australian Open, she reached her first Grand Slam quarterfinal but lost to Dominika Cibulková. She then won the biggest title of her career at the 2014 Qatar Total Open in Doha when she defeated Angelique Kerber in the final. She then reached the semifinals at Indian Wells, losing to Agnieszka Radwańska. She reached the final at the 2014 Mutua Madrid Open where she lost to Maria Sharapova in three sets. She bounced back at the 2014 French Open where she reached the final, her first grand slam final. She faced Sharapova and lost once again in tough three sets. At the 2014 Wimbledon Championships, she reached the semifinals, where she lost to Eugenie Bouchard in straight sets. Playing in front of her home crowd, Halep was impressive when she defeated 2nd seed Roberta Vinci in the final of the inaugural BRD Bucharest Open. After reaching her career high ranking of number 2, she played the Western & Southern Open but once again lost to Sharapova in the quarterfinals. At the 2014 US Open, Simona was one of the heavy favourites to make it to the final. She won her first two matches over Danielle Collins and Jana Čepelová but fell to a resurging Mirjana Lučić-Baroni in the third round.

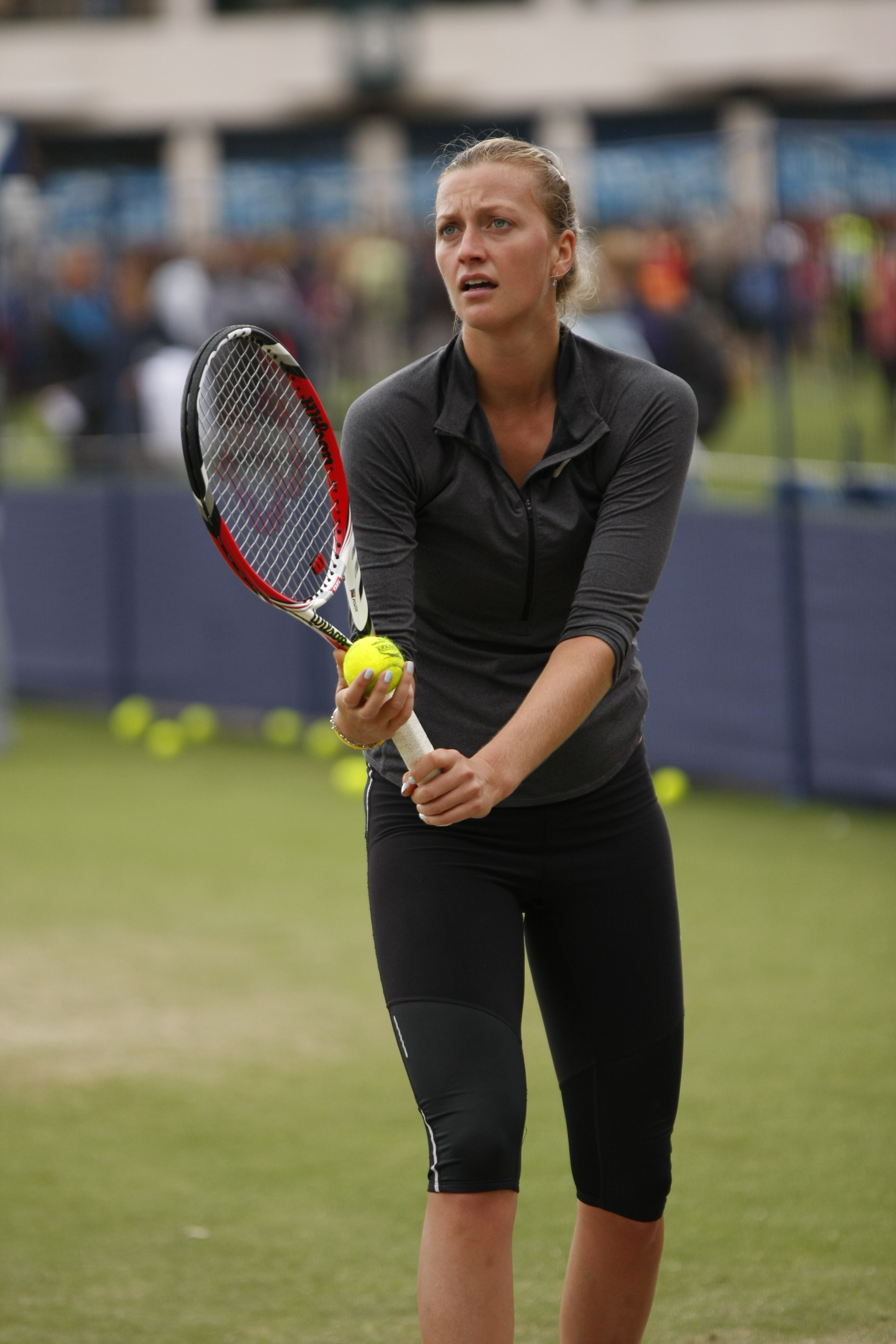
Petra Kvitová won her second slam at Wimbledon.

On 27 September, Petra Kvitová was announced as the fourth qualifier after winning the inaugural Wuhan Open.

Petra Kvitová had a resurgence after a disappointing 2013 and early 2014. She started the season at the Hopman Cup, playing with Radek Štěpánek where they fell in the group stage. After making the semifinals in Sydney, she experienced a huge upset against Luksika Kumkhum in the first round of the Australian Open. She then made the quarterfinals in Doha, the fourth round in Indian Wells and the quarterfinals in Miami. During the clay court season, Kvitová lost to Simona Halep in the semifinals of Madrid and then fell in her opener in Rome. At the French Open, Kvitová lost a tight three-setter against Svetlana Kuznetsova in the third round. Kvitová then won her second Grand Slam title at Wimbledon, where she defeated Eugenie Bouchard in the final in 55 minutes with the loss of just three games, making it one of the most lopsided Grand Slam finals in history. After a couple of early losses in Montreal and Cincinnati, she picked up her second title of the year in New Haven but was then handed an upset by Serbian youngster Aleksandra Krunić in the third round of the US Open. Kvitová bounced back with a strong performance during the Asian swing, winning the inaugural Wuhan Open where she beat Bouchard in the final, and then finishing runner-up to Maria Sharapova at the China Open.

On 2 October, the last four remaining spots were filled by Eugenie Bouchard, Agnieszka Radwańska, Ana Ivanovic and Caroline Wozniacki. All four players qualified after Angelique Kerber and Ekaterina Makarova exit in their respective third round matches at the China Open and Li Na's retirement from tennis.

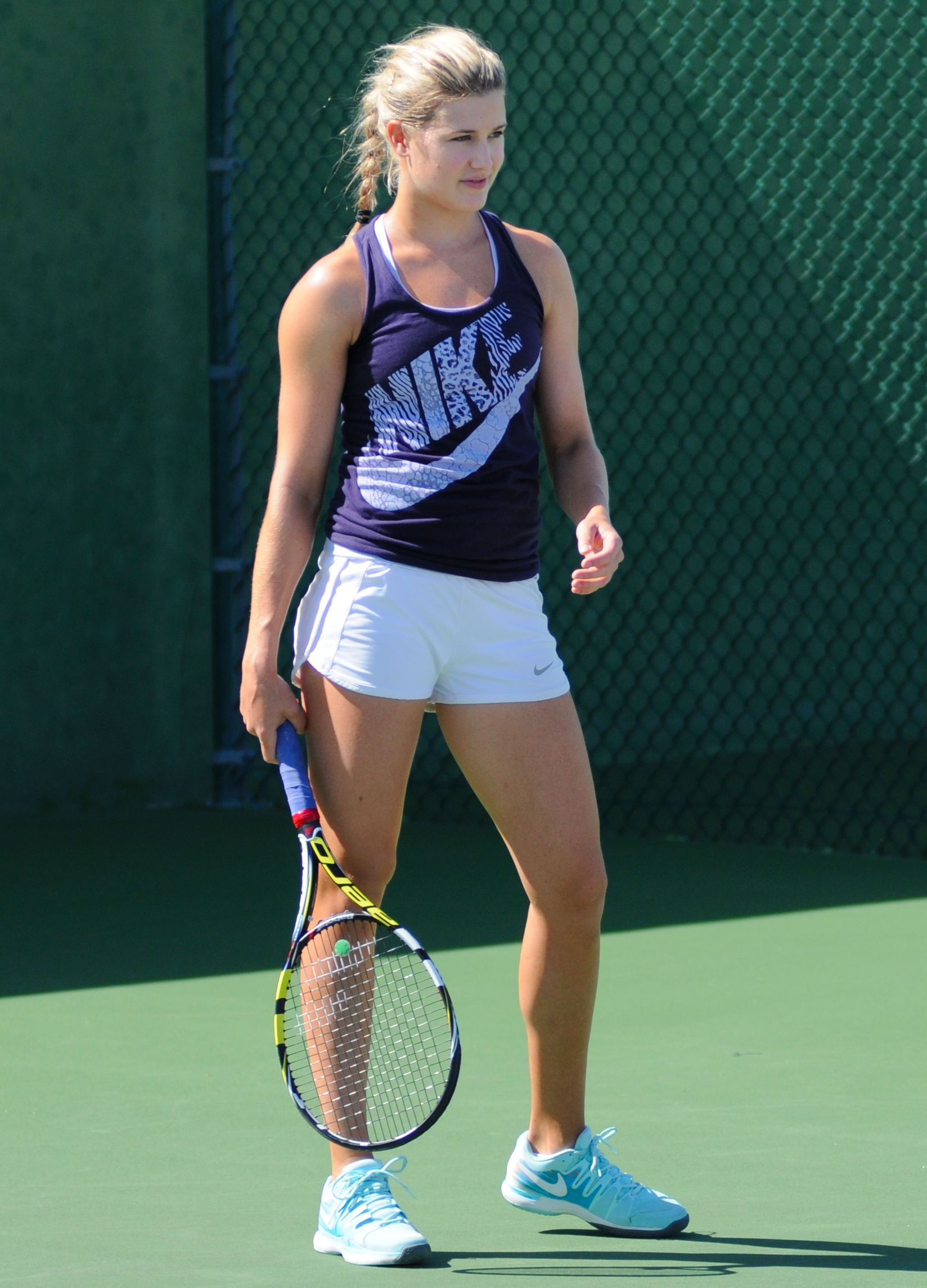
Eugenie Bouchard reached her first slam final at Wimbledon.

Eugenie Bouchard made a breakthrough in 2014 entering the top 10 for the first time. At the first slam of the year at the Australian Open, she got to the second week for the first time and further reaching the semifinals losing to eventual champion Li Na, being the first Canadian since 1984 to reach the semifinals of a slam. She then won her first WTA title at the Nürnberger Versicherungscup defeating Karolína Plíšková in the final. She followed it up with her second slam semifinal at the French Open losing to eventual champion Maria Sharapova. At Wimbledon, Bouchard did even better reaching her first slam final defeating Simona Halep in the semifinals but losing to Petra Kvitová in less than an hour in one of the most lopsided slam finals in history. Bouchard loss back-to-back opening matches at the Rogers Cup and Western & Southern Open in three sets. She suffered her first loss in the year before the semifinals of a slam at the US Open at the fourth round to Ekaterina Makarova. At the Asian swing she reached her first Premier 5 final at the inaugural Wuhan Open, once again losing to Kvitová.

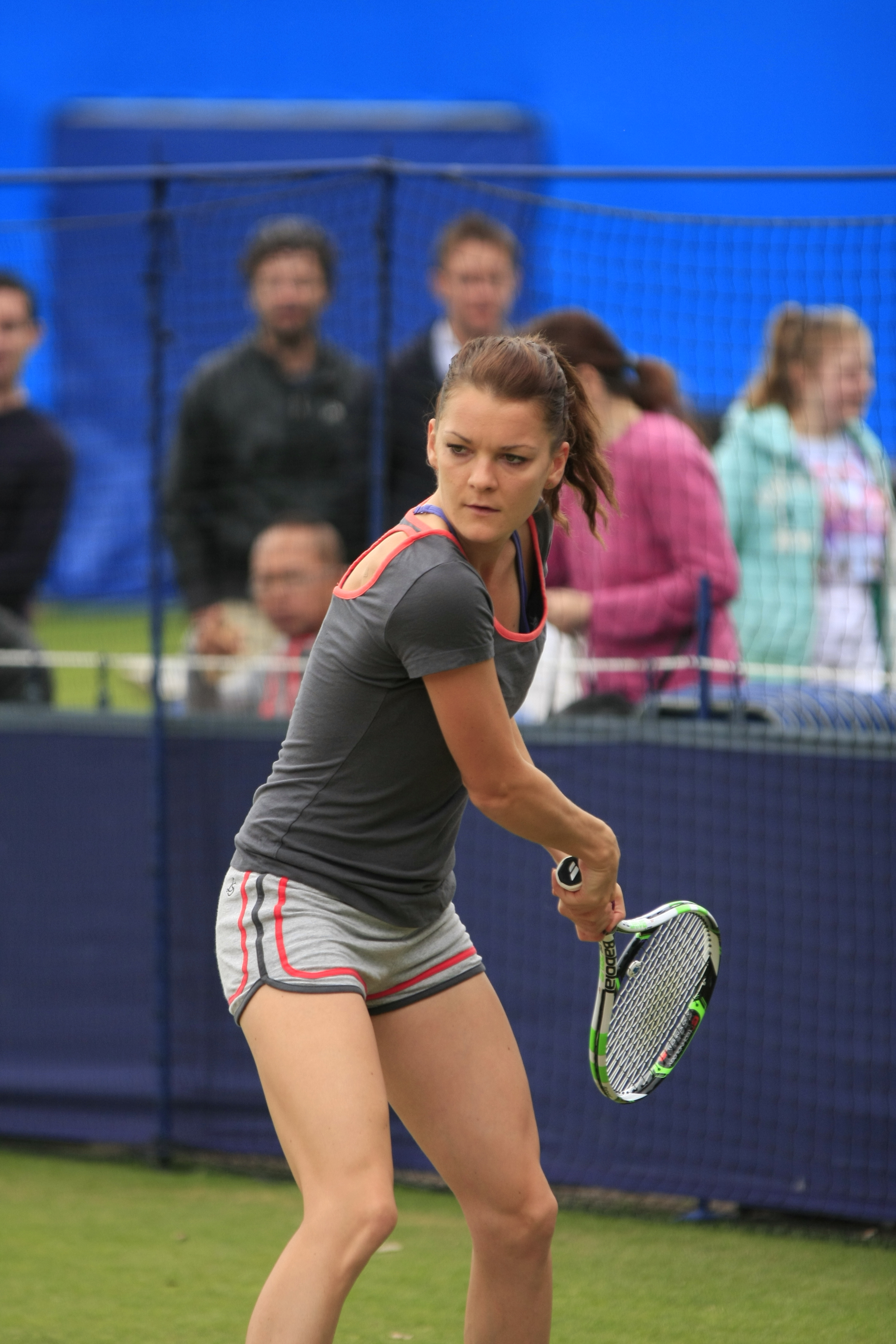
Agnieszka Radwańska reached her first Australian Open semifinal.

Agnieszka Radwańska didn't have the same success she had in 2012 and 2013, enduring a decline in form with inconsistent results. She failed to defend her title at the Sydney International losing in the second round to Bethanie Mattek-Sands. However, she reached her first Australian Open semifinal upsetting two-time defending champion, Victoria Azarenka in the Quarterfinals before losing to Dominika Cibulková. She then reached the semifinals of the Qatar Total Open losing to Simona Halep. The Pole then went on to reach her first Indian Wells final before losing to Flavia Pennetta who had defeated World No. 2 and reigning Australian Open Champion, Li Na. She returned to her home country to play at the BNP Paribas Katowice Open but lost in the semifinals to Alizé Cornet. She was also a semifinalist at the 2014 Mutua Madrid Open losing to eventual champion Maria Sharapova once again. She couldn't consolidate those strong showings at the 2014 French Open, losing in the third round to Ajla Tomljanović. She also lost early at the 2014 Wimbledon Championships, bowing out to Ekaterina Makarova in the fourth round. She did however win her first title of the season at the 2014 Rogers Cup defeating Venus Williams in the final. At the last grand slam of the season the US Open, she lost in the second round to eventual semifinalist, Peng Shuai.

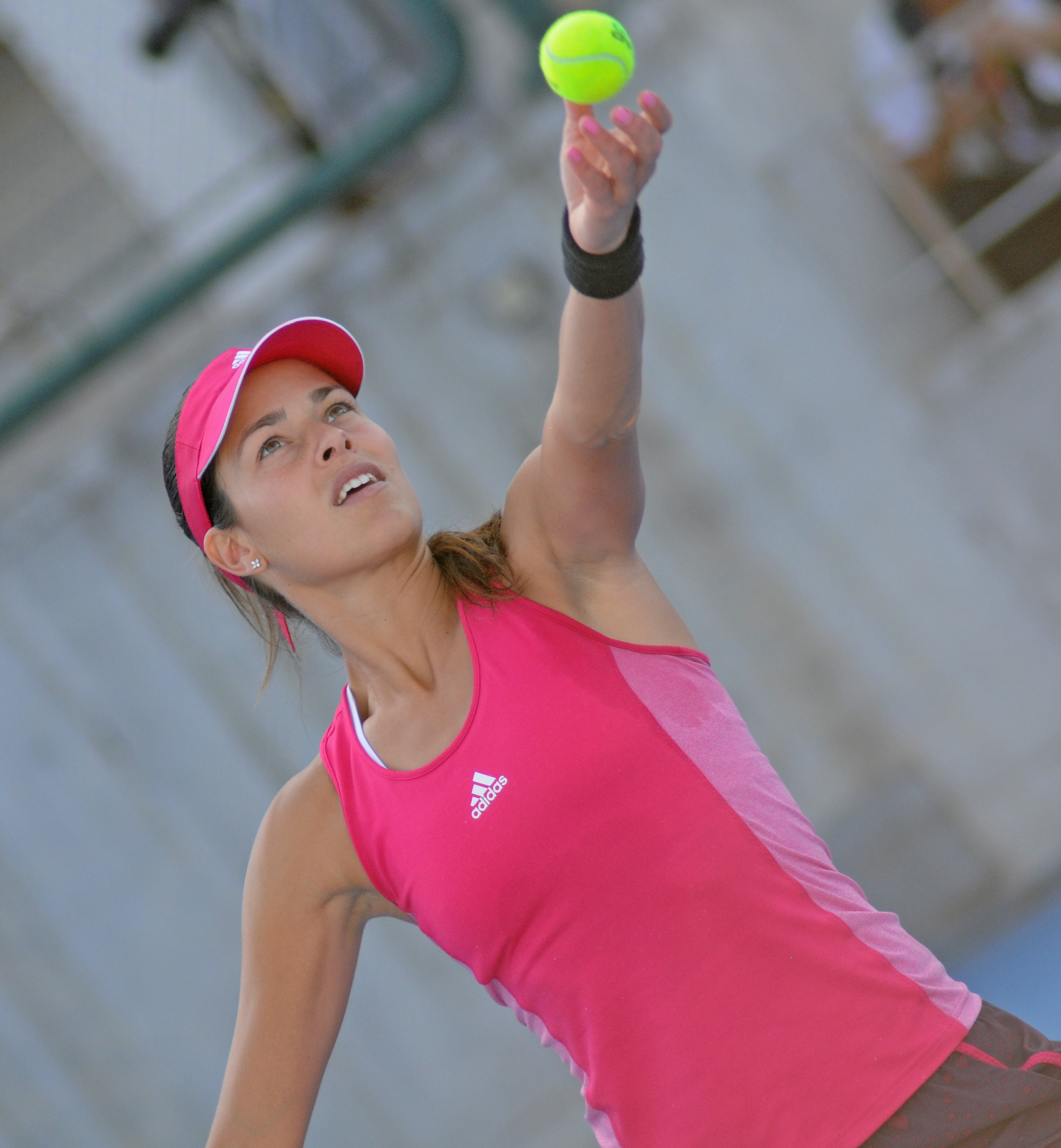
Ana Ivanovic won four titles in the year.

Ana Ivanovic had a resurgence in 2014, returning to the top 10 for the first time since 2009. She began the season with a title at the ASB Classic defeating Venus Williams, this is her first title in over 2 years. She followed it up with a quarterfinal showing at the Australian Open defeating world no. 1 Serena Williams before losing to Eugenie Bouchard. She then won her second title of the year at the Monterrey Open defeating compatriot Jovana Jakšić in the first all-Serbian final. She suffered her first loss in a final of the year at the Porsche Tennis Grand Prix to two-time defending champion Maria Sharapova. At the French Open, she lost to Lucie Šafářová in the third round, marking her 5th consecutive loss to the Czech. She bounced back at the Aegon Classic defeating Czech Barbora Záhlavová-Strýcová in straight set for her third title of the year. However, she made another early exit at a slam, losing in the third round of Wimbledon to Sabine Lisicki. She reached her biggest final since 2009 BNP Paribas Open, at the Western & Southern Open, beating Sharapova in semifinal, but losing to Serena Williams in straight sets In final. At the final slam the US Open, she suffered another early defeat to Karolína Plíšková. She won her fourth title of the year at the Toray Pan Pacific Open defeating Caroline Wozniacki in the final. This marks the most titles she has won in a single year. She also reached the semifinals of the China Open losing to Maria Sharapova.

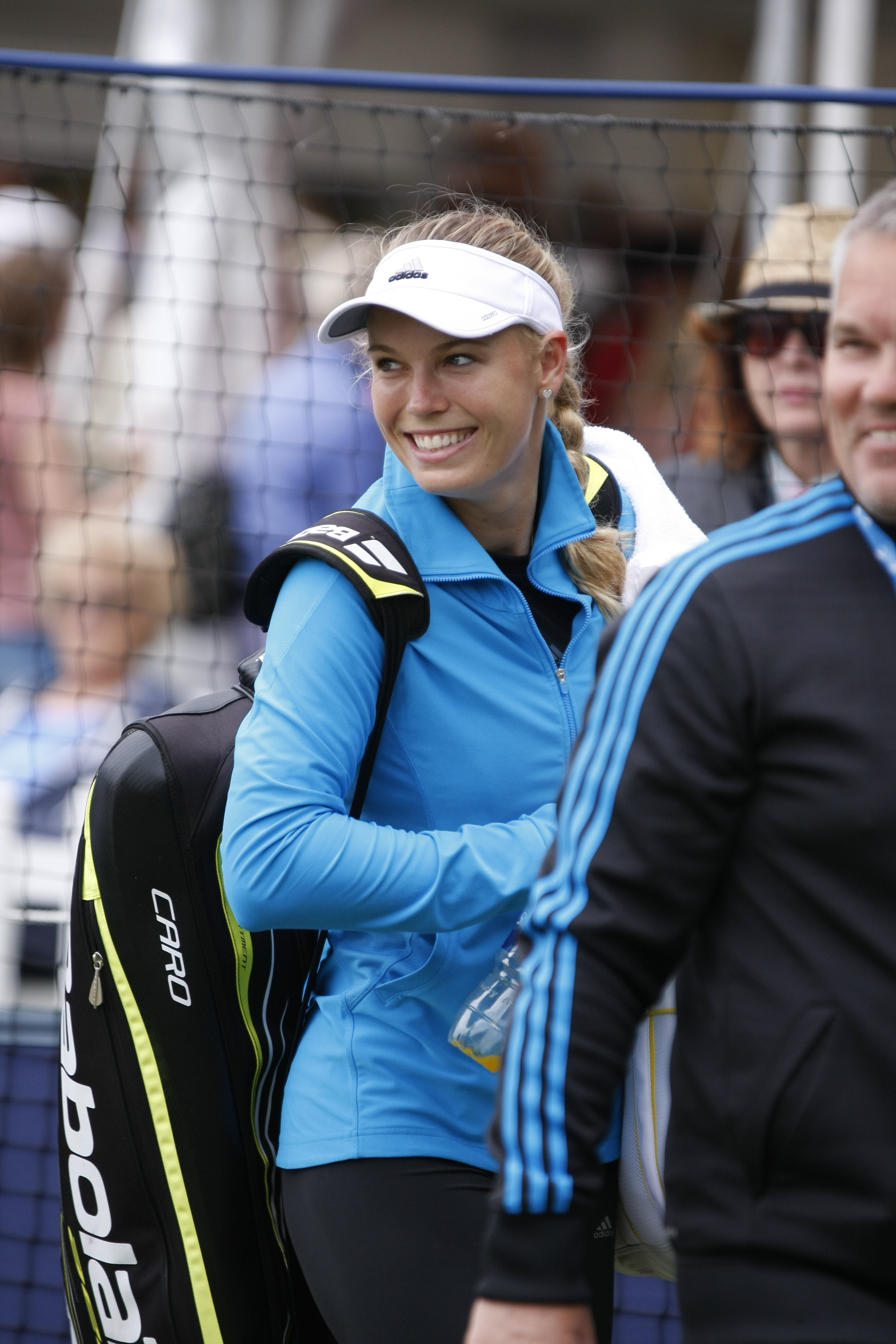
Caroline Wozniacki reached her second slam final at the US Open.

Caroline Wozniacki had a strong resurgence after a disappointing first half of the season. Her best results from the first half were the semifinals at the Dubai Tennis Championships losing to Venus Williams, the quarterfinals at the Sony Open losing to Li Na and the semifinals at the Monterrey Open losing to Ana Ivanovic. After losing in the first round at the French Open to Yanina Wickmayer, Wozniacki reached the semifinals at the Aegon International losing to Angelique Kerber. She then lost in the fourth round at Wimbledon to Barbora Záhlavová-Strýcová. She won her first title at the İstanbul Cup beating Roberta Vinci in the final. She followed that win with a quarterfinal appearance at the Rogers Cup and a semifinal appearance at the Western & Southern Open losing in both to Serena Williams. Then at the US Open she beat Maria Sharapova in the fourth round where she would eventually reach her second US Open final losing again to Serena Williams. She then reached the final at the Toray Pan Pacific Open losing to Ana Ivanovic. She also reached the semifinals at the Wuhan Open losing to Eugenie Bouchard.

The first alternate of the tour finals was Angelique Kerber. She reached four finals in the year, but lost in all of them. Her biggest final was at the Premier 5 event of the Qatar Total Open losing to Simona Halep in straight sets. She also reached three other Premier 470 events at the Apia International Sydney, Aegon International and Bank of the West Classic losing to Tsvetana Pironkova, Madison Keys and Serena Williams, respectively. She also reached the quarterfinals of Wimbledon. The second alternate spot was taken by Ekaterina Makarova. This is the Russians first trip to the tour finals as a singles player, she made her first slam semifinals at the US Open losing to world no. 1 Serena Williams in straight sets. She also reached the quarterfinals of Wimbledon. She won her lone title of the year at the PTT Pattaya Open defeating Karolína Plíšková in two tight sets.

=== Doubles ===
#	Players	Points	Tourn	Date Qualified
1	Sara Errani (ITA); Roberta Vinci (ITA)	9,315	18	11 July
2	Hsieh Su-wei (TPE); Peng Shuai (CHN)	5,262	12	10 September
3	Cara Black (ZIM); Sania Mirza (IND)	5,185	21	22 September
4	Ekaterina Makarova (RUS); Elena Vesnina (RUS)	5,130	13	10 September
5	Raquel Kops-Jones (USA); Abigail Spears (USA)	4,240	21	25 September
6	Květa Peschke (CZE); Katarina Srebotnik (SLO)	3,950	18	2 October
7	Garbiñe Muguruza (ESP); Carla Suárez Navarro (ESP)	3,515	12	5 October
8	Alla Kudryavtseva (RUS); Anastasia Rodionova (AUS)	3,410	21	12 October

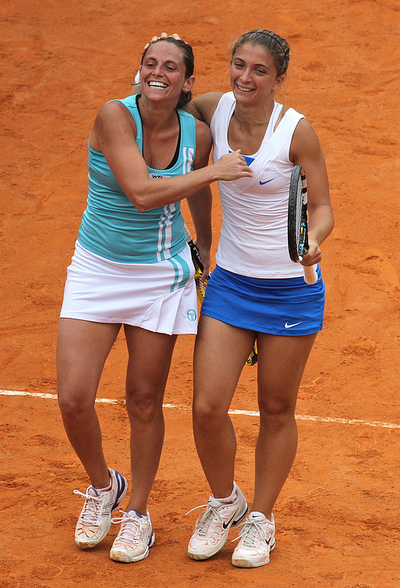
Sara Errani and Roberta Vinci won the 2014 Australian Open and Wimbledon

On 11 July, Sara Errani and Roberta Vinci were announced as the first team to qualify for the Championships.

Sara Errani & Roberta Vinci recaptured their form in 2014, reclaiming the world no. 1 ranking. They were able to reach three slams finals winning two of them, they were able to defend their Australian Open title defeating Russians Makarova & Vesnina and completed the career grand slam by winning Wimbledon over Babos& Mladenovic, thus becoming only the fifth pairing to complete the career grand slam. They also reached the final of the French Open for the third time in a row but fell to the Asian pairing of Hsieh & Peng. The Italian duo also captured three more titles, the Mutua Madrid Open over the local pairing of Muguruza & Suárez Navarro, and at the Rogers Cup and Porsche Tennis Grand Prix both over Black & Mirza. They also reached two other finals but lost, at the Apia International Sydney to Babos & Šafářová and at the Internazionali BNL d'Italia to Peschke & Srebotnik.

On 10 September, Hsieh Su-wei & Peng Shuai and Ekaterina Makarova & Elena Vesnina became the second and third team to qualify for the Championships.

Hsieh Su-wei & Peng Shuai, champions of the previous year, became the top team of the year both becoming number 1's in doubles. They claimed their first title of the year at the Qatar Total Open by defeating the pairing of Peschke & Srebotnik in straight sets. They followed it up with a title at the BNP Paribas Open over Black & Mirza. They won their final title of the year at the French Open defeating Errani & Vinci, their second slam title as a team and as individuals. Hsieh and Peng announced after the US Open that they are ending their partnership after 2014.

Ekaterina Makarova & Elena Vesnina became runners-up on their first Tour Championships in 2013. In the next season they reached three finals, the latest of which, the US Open, they won over Hingis & Pennetta; it was the pair's second Grand Slam title in their career. The Russians also reached the finals of the Australian Open losing to Errani & Vinci and the Miami Masters losing to Hingis & Lisicki.

On September 22, after winning the Toray Pan Pacific Open, the team of Zimbabwe's Cara Black and India's Sania Mirza was announced as the fourth qualifier.

Cara Black & Sania Mirza paired up at the last quarter of the 2013 season. The pairing reached six finals in the year, but only won two of them, the first being at the Portugal Open defeating Hrdinová & Solovyeva and the second one at the Toray Pan Pacific Open defeating Muguruza & Suárez Navarro. They lost at the BNP Paribas Open to Hsieh & Peng, Porsche Tennis Grand Prix and Rogers Cup to the Italian duo of Errani & Vinci, and the China Open to Hlaváčková & Peng. Mirza also reached two Mixed Doubles final, winning the US Open with Bruno Soares defeating Spears & González and losing the Australian Open with Horia Tecău to Mladenovic & Nestor

On 25 September, the American pair Raquel Kops-Jones and Abigail Spears qualified for the Championships.

Raquel Kops-Jones & Abigail Spears, partners since late 2011 had their best season, it began by reaching their first slam semifinal at the Australian Open. They also won two titles in the year, their biggest title coming at the Western & Southern Open defeating Babos & Mladenovic. They also won the Aegon Classic, their first grass title defeating Australians Barty & Dellacqua. Spears also reached the final of the US Open Mixed Doubles with Santiago González losing to Mirza & Soares

On 2 October, Peschke and Srebotnik became the sixth team to be qualified.

Květa Peschke & Katarina Srebotnik who resumed their partnership are participating in the tour finals for the fifth time together. The pair reached two finals in the year and went one-to-one, winning the Internazionali BNL d'Italia defeating Italians Errani & Vinci and losing at the Qatar Total Open to the Asian pairing of Hsieh & Peng. Peschke also won the title at the Open GDF Suez with Anna-Lena Grönefeld defeating Babos & Mladenovic.

On 5 October, Garbiñe Muguruza & Carla Suárez Navarro became the seventh pair in the finals.

Garbiñe Muguruza & Carla Suárez Navarro are one of the youngest formed teams to be qualified for the Championships. They were able capture their first title as a team at the Bank of the West Classic defeating Kania & Siniakova. They also reached two other finals but lost, at the Mutua Madrid Open to Errani & Vinci and at the Toray Pan Pacific Open to Black & Mirza. They also reached the semifinals of the French Open. Mugurza also won another title at the Grand Prix SAR La Princesse Lalla Meryem with Oprandi defeating Piter & Zanevska.

On October 12, after winning the Tianjin Open, Alla Kudryavtseva and Anastasia Rodionova claimed the final spot.

Alla Kudryavtseva & Anastasia Rodionova became a stable duo since September 2013. They won three titles out of four finals; although those were International or Premier tournaments, the pair also showed fine results in the major tournaments, including reaching the quarterfinals of Wimbledon, or the semifinals of the China Open. For both players, the 2014 season was one of their best in their tennis career.

== Groupings ==
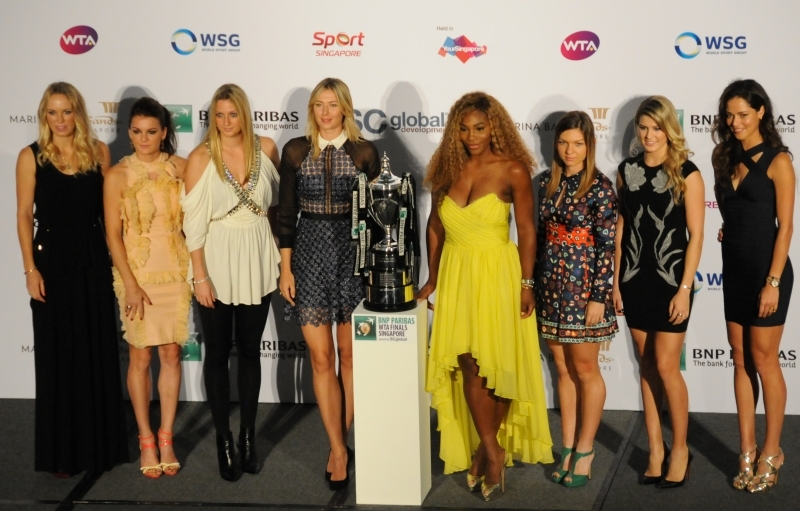
From left: Caroline Wozniacki, Agnieszka Radwańska, Petra Kvitová, Maria Sharapova, Serena Williams, Simona Halep, Eugenie Bouchard and Ana Ivanović at the WTA Finals 2014 Single's draw ceremony, Singapore.

The 2014 edition of the year–end finals will feature four current or former World number ones, four Grand Slam champions and four Grand Slam finalists. The competitors were divided into two groups representing the colors of the flag of Singapore.

Red group:
Serena Williams, Simona Halep, Eugenie Bouchard & Ana Ivanovic
White group:
Maria Sharapova, Petra Kvitová, Agnieszka Radwańska & Caroline Wozniacki

In the red group, their respective all-time head-to-head records in their group, no. 1 seed Serena Williams was 11–1, no. 4 seed Simona Halep was 3–5, no.5 seed Eugenie Bouchard was 3–2, and no. 7 seed Ana Ivanovic was 2–11. Williams has an almost perfect record in her group. She is 3–0 against Halep, with their last meeting being a straight sets victory for Williams at the 2013 Western & Southern Open. Against Bouchard, Williams is 1–0, winning their only match against each other in three sets at the 2013 Western & Southern Open. In her match-up with Ivanovic, Williams leads 7–1, with her only loss to the Serbian coming at the 2014 Australian Open. However, the American has won the last three matches, including the most recent at the 2014 Western & Southern Open. Halep and Bouchard split their two meetings against each other, both coming this year, with Bouchard winning their most recent match at the 2014 Wimbledon Championships. Halep leads her head-to-head with Ivanovic 2–1, including winning the last time they met at the 2014 Mutua Madrid Open. In the final match-up in the group, Bouchard leads Ivanovic 2–0, which includes their most recent meeting at the 2014 Australian Open.

In the white group, their respective all-time head-to-head records in their group, no. 2 seed Maria Sharapova was 21–7, no.3 seed Petra Kvitová was 11-11, no. 6 seed Agnieszka Radwańska was 7-21 and no. 8 seed Caroline Wozniacki was 13-13. Sharapova is 6–2 against Kvitová, winning the last five, including most recently at the 2014 China Open. Against Radwańska, Sharapova is 10–2, winning their last three meetings, the most recent being a straight sets victory at the 2014 Mutua Madrid Open. Sharapova also leads her head-to-head with Wozniacki 5–3, however Wozniacki won their last meeting in three sets at the 2014 US Open. Kvitová leads her match-up with Radwańska 5–1, with the Czech winning the last time the two played at the 2013 WTA Tour Championships. Kvitová and Wozniacki are tied in their head-to-head at 4-4, the Dane winning their last meeting at the 2013 Western & Southern Open. In the final head to head, Wozniacki leads Radwańska 6–4, including a straight sets victory in only encounter this year at the 2014 Western & Southern Open.

== Player head-to-head ==
Below are the head-to-head records as they approached the tournament.

2014 WTA Finals – Singles

		Williams	Sharapova	Kvitová	Halep	Bouchard	Radwańska	Ivanovic	Wozniacki	Overall
1	(United States) Serena Williams		16–2	5–0	3–0	1–0	8–0	7–1	9–1	49–4
2	(Russia) Maria Sharapova	2–16		6–2	5–0	3–0	10–2	9–4	5–3	40–27
3	(Czech Republic) Petra Kvitová	0–5	2–6		0–2	3–0	5–1	3–4	4–4	17–22
4	(Romania) Simona Halep	0–3	0–5	2–0		1–1	2–4	1–2	1–1	7–16
5	(Canada) Eugenie Bouchard	0–1	0–3	0–3	1–1		0–1	2–0	1–0	4–9
6	(Poland) Agnieszka Radwańska	0–8	2–10	1–5	4–2	1–0		7–3	4–6	19–34
7	(Serbia) Ana Ivanovic	1–7	4–9	4–3	2–1	0–2	3–7		5–2	19–31
8	(Denmark) Caroline Wozniacki	1–9	3–5	4–4	1–1	0–1	6–4	2–5		17–29

== Day-by-day summaries ==
2014 WTA Finals – Day-by-day summaries

=== Day 1 (17 October) ===
Matches
Event	Winner	Loser	Score
Rising Stars round robin	(Puerto Rico) Monica Puig [2]	(Kazakhstan) Zarina Diyas [1]	7–5, 6–2
Rising Stars round robin	(China) Saisai Zheng [4]	(United States) Shelby Rogers [3]	2–6, 6–2, [10–6]

=== Day 2 (18 October) ===
Matches
Event	Winner	Loser	Score
Rising Stars round robin	(United States) Shelby Rogers [3]	(Kazakhstan) Zarina Diyas [1]	6–1, 6–3
Rising Stars round robin	(Puerto Rico) Monica Puig [2]	(China) Saisai Zheng [4]	7–6^{(7–3)}, 4–6, [10–6]

=== Day 3 (19 October) ===
Matches
Event	Winner	Loser	Score
Rising Stars round robin	(China) Saisai Zheng [4]	(Kazakhstan) Zarina Diyas [1]	7–6^{(7–4)}, 6–7^{(2–7)}, [10–5]
Rising Stars round robin	(Puerto Rico) Monica Puig [2]	(United States) Shelby Rogers [3]	6–3, 6–7^{(4–7)}, [11–9]

=== Day 4 (20 October) ===
Matches
Event	Group	Winner	Loser	Score
Legends Classic doubles	N/A	(France) Marion Bartoli (United States) Martina Navratilova	(United States) Tracy Austin (Croatia) Iva Majoli	8–5
Singles round robin	Red Group	(United States) Serena Williams [1]	(Serbia) Ana Ivanovic [7]	6–4, 6–4
Singles round robin	Red Group	(Romania) Simona Halep [4]	(Canada) Eugenie Bouchard [5]	6–2, 6–3

=== Day 5 (21 October) ===
Matches
Event	Group	Winner	Loser	Score
Rising Stars Final	N/A	(Puerto Rico) Monica Puig [2]	(China) Saisai Zheng [4]	6–4, 6–3
Singles round robin	White Group	(Denmark) Caroline Wozniacki [8]	(Russia) Maria Sharapova [2]	7–6^{(7–4)}, 6–7^{(5–7)}, 6–2
Singles round robin	White Group	(Poland) Agnieszka Radwańska [6]	(Czech Republic) Petra Kvitová [3]	6–2, 6–3

=== Day 6 (22 October) ===
Matches
Event	Group	Winner	Loser	Score
Doubles Quarterfinals	N/A	(Russia) Alla Kudryavtseva (Australia) Anastasia Rodionova	(Russia) Ekaterina Makarova [4] (Russia) Elena Vesnina [4]	4–6, 6–2, [10–6]
Singles round robin	Red Group	(Romania) Simona Halep [4]	(United States) Serena Williams [1]	6–0, 6–2
Singles round robin	Red Group	(Serbia) Ana Ivanovic [7]	(Canada) Eugenie Bouchard [5]	6–1, 6–3
Doubles Quarterfinals	N/A	(Chinese Taipei) Su-Wei Hsieh [2] (China) Shuai Peng [2]	(Spain) Garbiñe Muguruza (Spain) Carla Suárez Navarro	6–4, 6–1
Legends Classic doubles	N/A	(United States) Tracy Austin (France) Marion Bartoli	(Croatia) Iva Majoli (United States) Martina Navratilova	8–4

=== Day 7 (23 October) ===
Matches
Event	Group	Winner	Loser	Score
Singles round robin	White Group	(Denmark) Caroline Wozniacki [8]	(Poland) Agnieszka Radwańska [6]	7–5, 6–3
Singles round robin	White Group	(Czech Republic) Petra Kvitová [3]	(Russia) Maria Sharapova [2]	6–3, 6–2
Singles round robin	Red Group	(United States) Serena Williams [1]	(Canada) Eugenie Bouchard [5]	6–1, 6–1
Doubles Quarterfinals	N/A	(Zimbabwe) Cara Black [3] (India) Sania Mirza [3]	(United States) Raquel Kops-Jones (United States) Abigail Spears	6–3, 2–6, [12–10]
Legends Classic doubles	N/A	(France) Marion Bartoli (Croatia) Iva Majoli	(United States) Tracy Austin (United States) Martina Navratilova	8–3

=== Day 8 (24 October) ===
Matches
Event	Group	Winner	Loser	Score
Singles round robin	White Group	(Russia) Maria Sharapova [2]	(Poland) Agnieszka Radwańska [6]	7–5, 6–7^{(4–7)}, 6–2
Singles round robin	White Group	(Denmark) Caroline Wozniacki [8]	(Czech Republic) Petra Kvitová [3]	6–2, 6–3
Singles round robin	Red Group	(Serbia) Ana Ivanovic [7]	(Romania) Simona Halep [4]	7–6^{(9–7)}, 3–6, 6–3
Doubles Quarterfinals	N/A	(Czech Republic) Květa Peschke (Slovenia) Katarina Srebotnik	(Italy) Sara Errani [1] (Italy) Roberta Vinci [1]	2–1, retired

=== Day 9 (25 October) ===
Matches
Event	Winner	Loser	Score
Doubles Semifinals	(Chinese Taipei) Su-Wei Hsieh [2] (China) Shuai Peng [2]	(Russia) Alla Kudryavtseva (Australia) Anastasia Rodionova	6–1, 6–4
Singles Semifinals	(United States) Serena Williams [1]	(Denmark) Caroline Wozniacki [8]	2–6, 6–3, 7–6^{(8–6)}
Singles Semifinals	(Romania) Simona Halep [4]	(Poland) Agnieszka Radwańska [6]	6–2, 6–2
Doubles Semifinals	(Zimbabwe) Cara Black [3] (India) Sania Mirza [3]	(Czech Republic) Květa Peschke (Slovenia) Katarina Srebotnik	4–6, 7–5, [11–9]

=== Day 10 (26 October) ===
Matches
Event	Winner	Loser	Score
Doubles Final	(Zimbabwe) Cara Black [3] (India) Sania Mirza [3]	(Chinese Taipei) Su-Wei Hsieh [2] (China) Shuai Peng [2]	6–1, 6–0
Singles Final	(United States) Serena Williams [1]	(Romania) Simona Halep [4]	6–3, 6–0

== Points breakdown ==
=== Singles ===
Players with a gold background have enough points to qualify, and players with a blue background can play as alternates (if qualified players withdrew or retired from the Championships). A brown background means a player retired from professional tennis.

Rank	Athlete	Grand Slam tournament				Premier Mandatory				Best Premier 5		Best other						Total points	Tourn
Rank	Athlete	AUS	FRA	WIM	USO	INW	MIA	MAD	BEI	1	2	1	2	3	4	5	6	Total points	Tourn
1	(United States) Serena Williams	R16; 240	R64; 70	R32; 130	W 2000	A 0	W 1000	QF; 215	QF; 215	W 900	W 900	W 470	W 470	SF; 350	SF; 185	R32; 1		7,146	17(15)
2	(Russia) Maria Sharapova	R16; 240	W 2000	R16; 240	R16; 240	R32; 65	SF; 390	W 1000	W 1000	SF; 350	R16; 105	W 470	SF; 185	SF; 185	R16; 105	R16; 105		6,680	15
3	(Czech Republic) Petra Kvitová	R128; 10	R32; 130	W 2000	R32; 130	R16; 120	QF; 215	SF; 390	F 650	W 900	QF; 190	W 470	SF; 185	R16; 105	QF; 100	R32; 1	R32; 1	5,597	18
4	(Romania) Simona Halep	QF; 430	F 1300	SF; 780	R32; 130	SF; 390	A 0	F 650	QF; 215	W 900	QF; 190	W 280	R16; 105	R16; 30	R32; 1	R32; 1	R32; 1	5,403	19(18)
5	(Canada) Eugenie Bouchard	SF; 780	SF; 780	F 1300	R16; 240	R16; 120	R64; 10	R64; 10	R32; 10	F 585	R64; 1	W 280	SF; 185	QF; 60	QF; 60	R16; 55	R16; 30	4,506	22
6	(Poland) Agnieszka Radwańska	SF; 780	R32; 130	R16; 240	R64; 70	F 650	QF; 215	SF; 390	R32; 65	W 900	SF; 350	QF; 190	QF; 190	SF; 110	QF; 100	QF; 60	R16; 1	4,441	20
7	(Serbia) Ana Ivanovic	QF; 430	R32; 130	R32; 130	R64; 70	R32; 65	R16; 120	QF; 215	SF; 390	F 585	SF; 350	W 470	W 470	F 305	W 280	W 280	QF; 100	4,390	21
8	(Denmark) Caroline Wozniacki	R32; 130	R128; 10	R16; 240	F 1300	R16; 120	QF; 215	R32; 65	R32; 10	SF; 350	SF; 350	F 305	W 280	QF; 190	SF; 185	SF; 185	SF; 110	4,045	19
9	(China) Li Na	W 2000	R128; 10	R32; 130	A 0	SF; 390	F 650	QF; 215	A 0	QF; 190	R16; 105	W 280						3,970	13(9)
10	(Germany) Angelique Kerber	R16; 240	R16; 240	QF; 430	R32; 130	R64; 10	QF; 215	R64; 10	R16; 120	F 585	QF; 190	F 305	F 305	F 305	SF; 185	R16; 105	R16; 105	3,480	22
11	(Russia) Ekaterina Makarova	R16; 240	R32; 130	QF; 430	SF; 780	R32; 65	R16; 120	R64; 10	R16; 120	SF; 350	R32; 60	W 280	SF; 110	QF; 100	R32; 60	R32; 60	R16; 55	2,970	20

- As of 20 October 2014

=== Doubles ===
Teams with a gold background have enough points to qualify.

Rank	Athlete	Points											Total points	Tourn
Rank	Athlete	1	2	3	4	5	6	7	8	9	10	11	Total points	Tourn
1	(Italy) Sara Errani (Italy) Roberta Vinci	W 2000	W 2000	F 1300	W 1000	W 900	F 585	W 470	SF; 350	F 305	QF; 215	QF; 190	9,315	18
2	(Chinese Taipei) Hsieh Su-wei (China) Peng Shuai	W 2000	W 1000	W 900	SF; 390	SF; 350	R16; 240	R16; 240	R32; 130	R32; 10	R16; 1	R16; 1	5,262	12
3	(Zimbabwe) Cara Black (India) Sania Mirza	SF; 780	F 650	F 650	F 585	W 470	QF; 430	QF; 430	SF; 390	F 305	W 280	QF; 215	5,185	21
4	(Russia) Ekaterina Makarova (Russia) Elena Vesnina	W 2000	F 1300	F 650	R16; 240	QF; 215	QF; 190	QF; 190	R32; 130	R16; 105	QF; 100	R16; 10	5,130	14
5	(United States) Raquel Kops-Jones (United States) Abigail Spears	W 900	SF; 780	W 470	SF; 390	SF; 350	F 305	R32; 240	QF; 215	QF; 215	QF; 190	SF; 185	4,240	21
6	(Czech Republic) Květa Peschke (Slovenia) Katarina Srebotnik	W 900	SF; 780	F 585	QF; 430	QF; 430	QF; 215	QF; 215	SF; 185	QF; 100	QF; 100	R16; 10	3,950	18
7	(Spain) Garbiñe Muguruza (Spain) Carla Suárez Navarro	SF; 780	F 650	W 470	F 305	R16; 240	R16; 240	QF; 215	QF; 215	QF; 190	R16; 105	R16; 105	3,515	12
8	(Russia) Alla Kudryavtseva (Australia) Anastasia Rodionova	W 470	W 470	QF; 430	SF; 390	SF; 350	W 280	R16; 240	QF; 215	QF; 190	QF; 190	SF; 185	3,410	21

- As of 20 October 2014

== See also ==
- WTA ranking Points
- 2014 ATP World Tour Finals
- 2014 Garanti Koza WTA Tournament of Champions
