= 2014 BRD Bucharest Open – Doubles =

Doubles
- 2014 BRD Bucharest Open

Final
- Champions: (Romania) Elena Bogdan (Romania) Alexandra Cadanțu
- Runners-up: (Turkey) Çağla Büyükakçay (Italy) Karin Knapp
- Score: 6–4, 3–6, [10–5]

Details
- Draw: 16
- Seeds: 4

Events
Singles	Doubles
- BRD Bucharest Open

Elena Bogdan and Alexandra Cadanțu won the first edition of the tournament, defeating Çağla Büyükakçay and Karin Knapp in the final, 6–4, 3–6, [10–5].

== Seeds ==
1. (Poland) Katarzyna Piter / (Ukraine) Olga Savchuk (semifinals)
2. (Slovakia) Janette Husárová / (Czech Republic) Renata Voráčová (first round)
3. (Spain) Lara Arruabarrena / (Spain) Silvia Soler Espinosa (first round)
4. (Romania) Irina-Camelia Begu / (Argentina) María Irigoyen (quarterfinals)

== Draw ==
Key

- Q = Qualifier
- WC = Wild card
- LL = Lucky loser
- Alt = Alternate
- ITF = ITF entry
- PR = Protected ranking
- SR = Special ranking
- SE = Special exempt
- JE = Junior exempt
- JR = Junior Accelerator Programme entrant
- CO = College Accelerator Programme entrant
- NG = Next Gen Accelerator Program entrant
- w/o = Walkover
- r = Retired
- d = Defaulted

=== Draw ===
First round
1	(Poland) K Piter (Ukraine) O Savchuk	6	6
(Czech Republic) P Cetkovská (Russia) A Panova	2	3
(Netherlands) K Bertens (Austria) T Paszek	6	6
Alt	(Serbia) T Čurović (Bulgaria) E Kostova	1	4
3	(Spain) L Arruabarrena (Spain) S Soler Espinosa	6	3	[9]
(Romania) R Olaru (Russia) V Solovyeva	3	6	[11]
(Hungary) R-L Jani (Ukraine) V Kapshay	2	6^{5}
WC	(Romania) E Bogdan (Romania) A Cadanțu	6	7^{7}
WC	(Romania) I Ducu (Romania) IL Roșca	2	6^{1}
(Turkey) Ç Büyükakçay (Italy) K Knapp	6	7^{7}
(Ukraine) L Kichenok (Ukraine) N Kichenok	4	2
4	(Romania) I-C Begu (Argentina) M Irigoyen	6	6
(Poland) P Kania (United States) A Tatishvili	6	6
(Argentina) T Búa (Chile) D Seguel	1	2
(Georgia (country)) O Kalashnikova (Serbia) A Krunić	6	0	[10]
2	(Slovakia) J Husárová (Czech Republic) R Voráčová	4	6	[4]

Quarterfinals
1	(Poland) K Piter (Ukraine) O Savchuk	6	4	[10]
(Netherlands) K Bertens (Austria) T Paszek	2	6	[8]
(Romania) R Olaru (Russia) V Solovyeva	3	5
WC	(Romania) E Bogdan (Romania) A Cadanțu	6	7
(Turkey) Ç Büyükakçay (Italy) K Knapp	7	5	[10]
4	(Romania) I-C Begu (Argentina) M Irigoyen	5	7	[8]
(Poland) P Kania (United States) A Tatishvili	7	3	[10]
(Georgia (country)) O Kalashnikova (Serbia) A Krunić	5	6	[7]

Semifinals
1	(Poland) K Piter (Ukraine) O Savchuk	4	6	[4]
WC	(Romania) E Bogdan (Romania) A Cadanțu	6	4	[10]
(Turkey) Ç Büyükakçay (Italy) K Knapp	6^{3}	6	[10]
(Poland) P Kania (United States) A Tatishvili	7^{7}	3	[4]

Final
WC	(Romania) E Bogdan (Romania) A Cadanțu	6	3	[10]
(Turkey) Ç Büyükakçay (Italy) K Knapp	4	6	[5]
