= 2014 BRD Bucharest Open =

- Date: 7–13 July
- Category: International
- Draw: 32S / 16D
- Prize money: $250,000
- Surface: Clay
- Location: Bucharest, Romania

Champions

Singles
- (Romania) Simona Halep

Doubles
- (Romania) Elena Bogdan / (Romania) Alexandra Cadanțu
- BRD Bucharest Open

The 2014 BRD Bucharest Open was a women's professional tennis tournament played on outdoor red clay courts. It was the inaugural edition of the tournament and was part of the International category of the 2014 WTA Tour. It took place at Arenele BNR in Bucharest, Romania between 7 July and 13 July 2014. First-seeded Simona Halep won the singles title.

== Finals ==
=== Singles ===
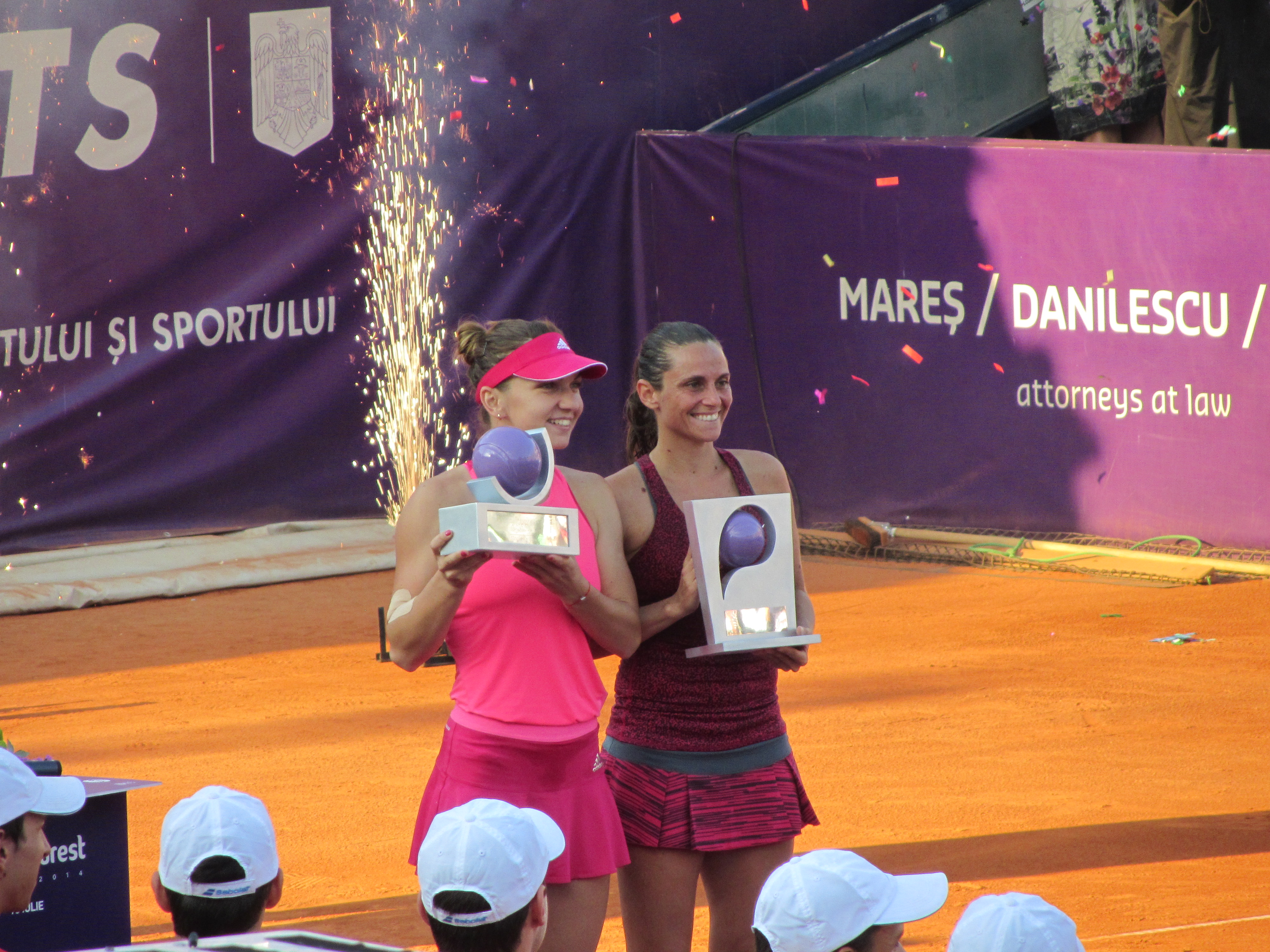
Simona Halep (left) and Roberta Vinci holding their first and second-place trophies respectively

- (Romania) Simona Halep defeated (Italy) Roberta Vinci, 6–1, 6–3

=== Doubles ===
- (Romania) Elena Bogdan / (Romania) Alexandra Cadanțu defeated (Turkey) Çağla Büyükakçay / (Italy) Karin Knapp, 6–4, 3–6, [10–5]

== Points and prize money ==
=== Point distribution ===
Event	W	F	SF	QF	Round of 16	Round of 32	Q	Q3	Q2	Q1
Singles	280	180	110	60	30	1	18	14	10	1
Doubles	280	180	110	60	1	—N/a	—N/a	—N/a	—N/a	—N/a

=== Prize money ===
Event	W	F	SF	QF	Round of 16	Round of 32	Round of 64	Q2	Q1
Singles	$43,000	$21,400	$11,300	$5,900	$3,310	$1,925	$1,005	$730	$530
Doubles	$12,300	$6,400	$3,435	$1,820	$960	—N/a	—N/a	—N/a	—N/a

== Singles main-draw entrants ==
=== Seeds ===
Country	Player	Rank^{1}	Seed
ROU	Simona Halep	3	1
ITA	Roberta Vinci	21	2
CZE	Klára Koukalová	32	3
ITA	Karin Knapp	47	4
GER	Annika Beck	54	5
SVK	Anna Schmiedlová	58	6
CZE	Petra Cetkovská	62	7
SLO	Polona Hercog	63	8

- ^{1} Rankings as of June 23, 2014.

=== Other entrants ===
The following players received wildcards into the main draw:

- (Romania) Cristina Dinu
- (Romania) Andreea Mitu
- (Romania) Raluca Olaru

The following players received entry from the qualifying draw:

- (Netherlands) Kiki Bertens
- (Kazakhstan) Sesil Karatantcheva
- (Estonia) Anett Kontaveit
- (Bulgaria) Elitsa Kostova

The following player received entry as a lucky loser:

- (Netherlands) Indy de Vroome

=== Withdrawals ===
Before the tournament

- (Israel) Julia Glushko
- (United States) Vania King
- (France) Kristina Mladenovic
- (Israel) Shahar Pe'er
- (Kazakhstan) Yaroslava Shvedova
- (Belgium) Alison Van Uytvanck
- (Czech Republic) Barbora Záhlavová-Strýcová

== WTA doubles main-draw entrants ==
=== Seeds ===
Country	Player	Country	Player	Rank^{1}	Seed
POL	Katarzyna Piter	UKR	Olga Savchuk	130	1
SVK	Janette Husárová	CZE	Renata Voráčová	135	2
ESP	Lara Arruabarrena	ESP	Sílvia Soler Espinosa	153	3
ROU	Irina-Camelia Begu	ARG	María Irigoyen	167	4

- ^{1} Rankings as of June 23, 2014.

=== Other entrants ===
The following pairs received wildcards into the main draw:

- (Romania) Elena Bogdan / (Romania) Alexandra Cadanțu
- (Romania) Ioana Ducu / (Romania) Ioana Loredana Roșca

The following pair received entry as alternates:

- (Serbia) Tamara Čurović / (Bulgaria) Elitsa Kostova

=== Withdrawals ===
Before the tournament

- (Paraguay) Verónica Cepede Royg (elbow injury)
