= 2014 WTA Finals – Singles =

Singles
- 2014 WTA Finals

Final
- Champion: (United States) Serena Williams
- Runner-up: (Romania) Simona Halep
- Score: 6–3, 6–0

Details
- Draw: 8 (RR + elimination)
- Seeds: 8

Events
Singles	Doubles
- WTA Finals

Two-time defending champion Serena Williams defeated Simona Halep in the final, 6–3, 6–0 to win the singles tennis title at the 2014 WTA Finals. Williams was the third player to win three consecutive Tour Finals singles titles (after Martina Navratilova and Monica Seles), and the first since Seles in 1992. During the tournament, she clinched her second consecutive and fourth career year-end world No. 1 ranking. She was the first woman to hold the top ranking for the entire calendar year since Steffi Graf in 1996. This was also Williams' final appearance in the Tour Finals.

Simona Halep and Eugenie Bouchard made their debuts at the event.

For the first time since 2004 and just the second time ever, a player with a 2–1 round robin record failed to reach the semifinals. This was Ana Ivanovic, who would have reached the semifinal had she defeated Halep in straight sets in her last round-robin match.

== Players ==
1. (United States) Serena Williams (champion)
2. (Russia) Maria Sharapova (round robin)
3. (Czech Republic) Petra Kvitová (round robin)
4. (Romania) Simona Halep (final)
5. (Canada) Eugenie Bouchard (round robin)
6. (Poland) Agnieszka Radwańska (semifinals)
7. (Serbia) Ana Ivanovic (round robin)
8. (Denmark) Caroline Wozniacki (semifinals)

== Alternates ==
1. (Germany) Angelique Kerber (Not used)
2. (Russia) Ekaterina Makarova (Not used)

== Draw ==
Key

- Q = Qualifier
- WC = Wild card
- LL = Lucky loser
- Alt = Alternate
- ITF = ITF entry
- PR = Protected ranking
- SR = Special ranking
- SE = Special exempt
- JE = Junior exempt
- JR = Junior Accelerator Programme entrant
- CO = College Accelerator Programme entrant
- NG = Next Gen Accelerator Program entrant
- w/o = Walkover
- r = Retired
- d = Defaulted

=== Finals ===
Semifinals
4	(Romania) Simona Halep	6	6
6	(Poland) Agnieszka Radwańska	2	2
8	(Denmark) Caroline Wozniacki	6	3	6^{6}
1	(United States) Serena Williams	2	6	7^{8}

Final
4	(Romania) Simona Halep	3	0
1	(United States) Serena Williams	6	6

=== Red group ===
		(United States) Williams	(Romania) Halep	(Canada) Bouchard	(Serbia) Ivanovic	RR W–L	Set W–L	Game W–L	Standings
1	(United States) Serena Williams		0–6, 2–6	6–1, 6–1	6–4, 6–4	2–1	4–2 (66.7%)	26–22 (54.2%)	2
4	(Romania) Simona Halep	6–0, 6–2		6–2, 6–3	6–7^{(7–9)}, 6–3, 3–6	2–1	5–2 (71.4%)	39–23 (62.9%)	1
5	(Canada) Eugenie Bouchard	1–6, 1–6	2–6, 3–6		1–6, 3–6	0–3	0–6 (0.0%)	11–36 (23.4%)	4
7	(Serbia) Ana Ivanovic	4–6, 4–6	7–6^{(9–7)}, 3–6, 6–3	6–1, 6–3		2–1	4–3 (57.1%)	36–31 (53.7%)	3

=== White group ===
		(Russia) Sharapova	(Czech Republic) Kvitová	(Poland) Radwańska	(Denmark) Wozniacki	RR W–L	Set W–L	Game W–L	Standings
2	(Russia) Maria Sharapova		3–6, 2–6	7–5, 6–7^{(4–7)}, 6–2	6–7^{(4–7)}, 7–6^{(7–5)}, 2–6	1–2	3–5 (37.5%)	39–45 (46.4%)	3
3	(Czech Republic) Petra Kvitová	6–3, 6–2		2–6, 3–6	2–6, 3–6	1–2	2–4 (33.3%)	22–29 (43.1%)	4
6	(Poland) Agnieszka Radwańska	5–7, 7–6^{(7–4)}, 2–6	6–2, 6–3		5–7, 3–6	1–2	3–4 (42.8%)	34–37 (47.8%)	2
8	(Denmark) Caroline Wozniacki	7–6^{(7–4)}, 6–7^{(5–7)}, 6–2	6–2, 6–3	7–5, 6–3		3–0	6–1 (85.7%)	44–28 (61.1%)	1
