= 2014 WTA Tour =

Women's tennis circuit

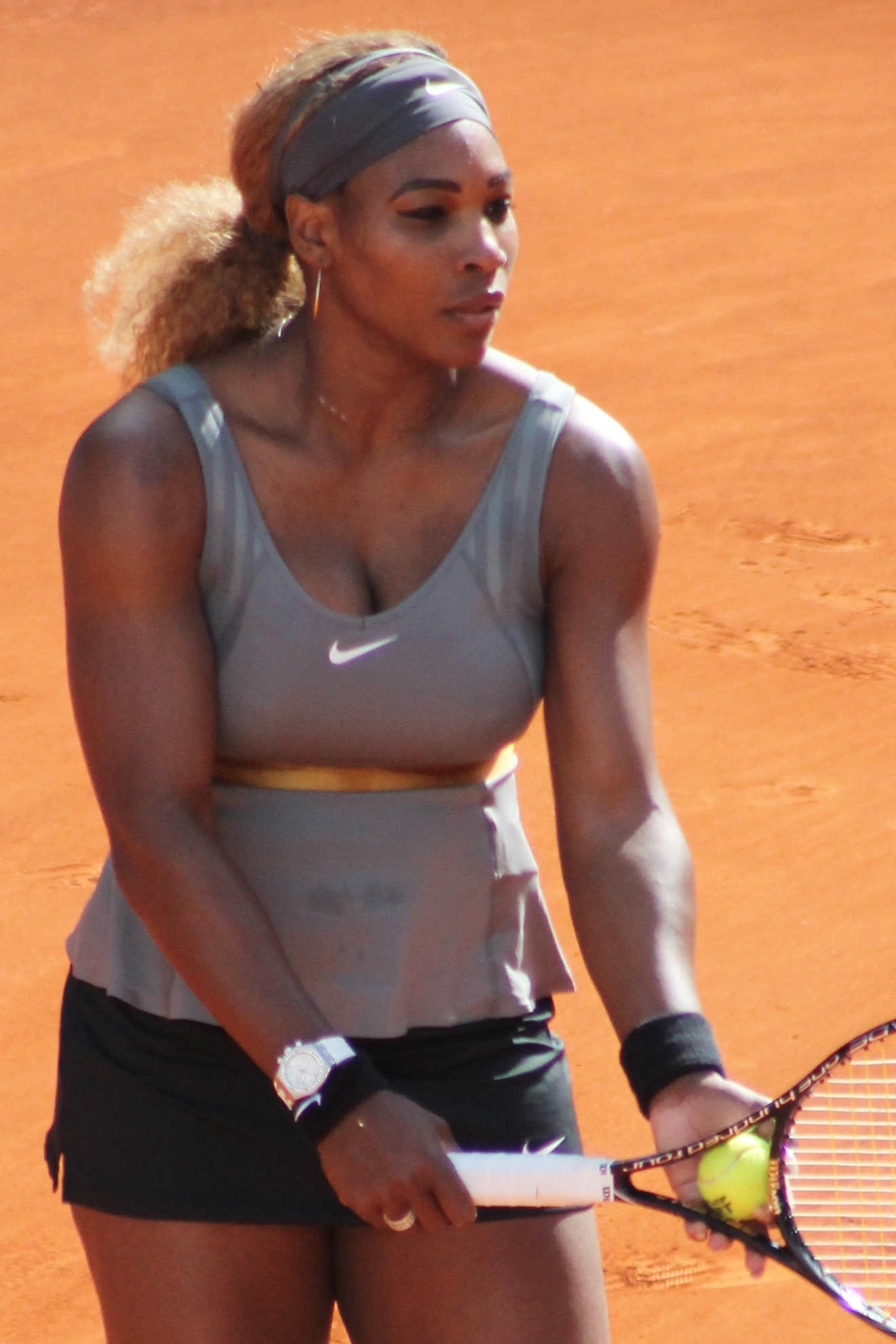
- Serena Williams finished the year as world No. 1 for the fourth time in her career. She won seven singles tournaments during the season, including a major at the US Open, as well as the WTA Finals. She also won three Premier Mandatory and Premier 5 events.

Details
- Duration: December 28, 2013 – November 9, 2014
- Edition: 44th
- Tournaments: 58
- Categories: Grand Slam (4); WTA Tour Championships; WTA Premier Mandatory (4); WTA Premier 5 (5); WTA Premier (12); WTA International (31); WTA Tournament of Champions

Achievements (singles)
- Most titles: (United States) Serena Williams (7)
- Most finals: (United States) Serena Williams (7)
- Prize money leader: (United States) Serena Williams (US$9,317,298)
- Points leader: (United States) Serena Williams (8,487)

Awards
- Player of the year: (United States) Serena Williams
- Doubles team of the year: (Italy) Sara Errani (Italy) Roberta Vinci
- Most improved player of the year: (Canada) Eugenie Bouchard
- Newcomer of the year: (Switzerland) Belinda Bencic
- Comeback player of the year: (Croatia) Mirjana Lučić-Baroni

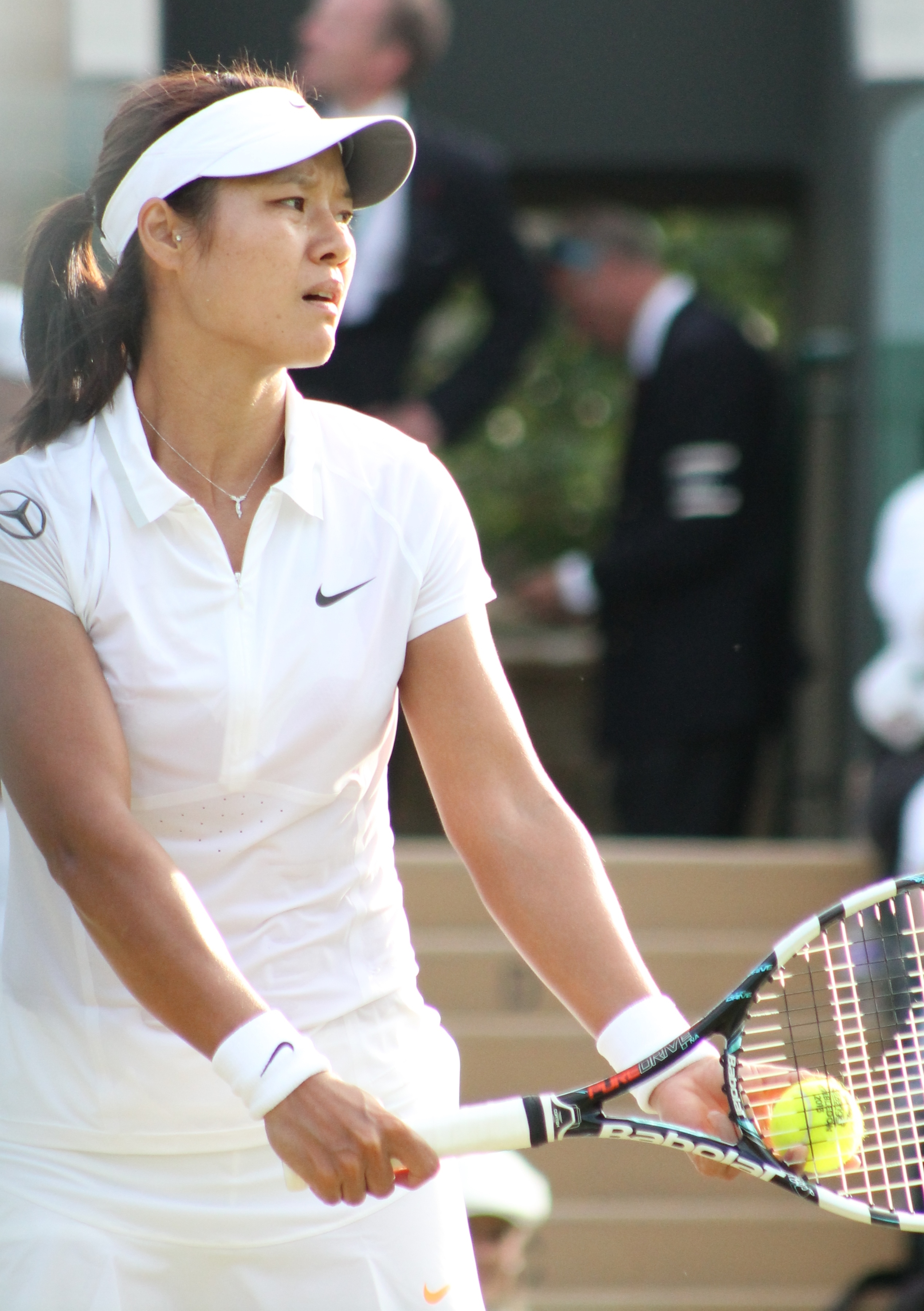
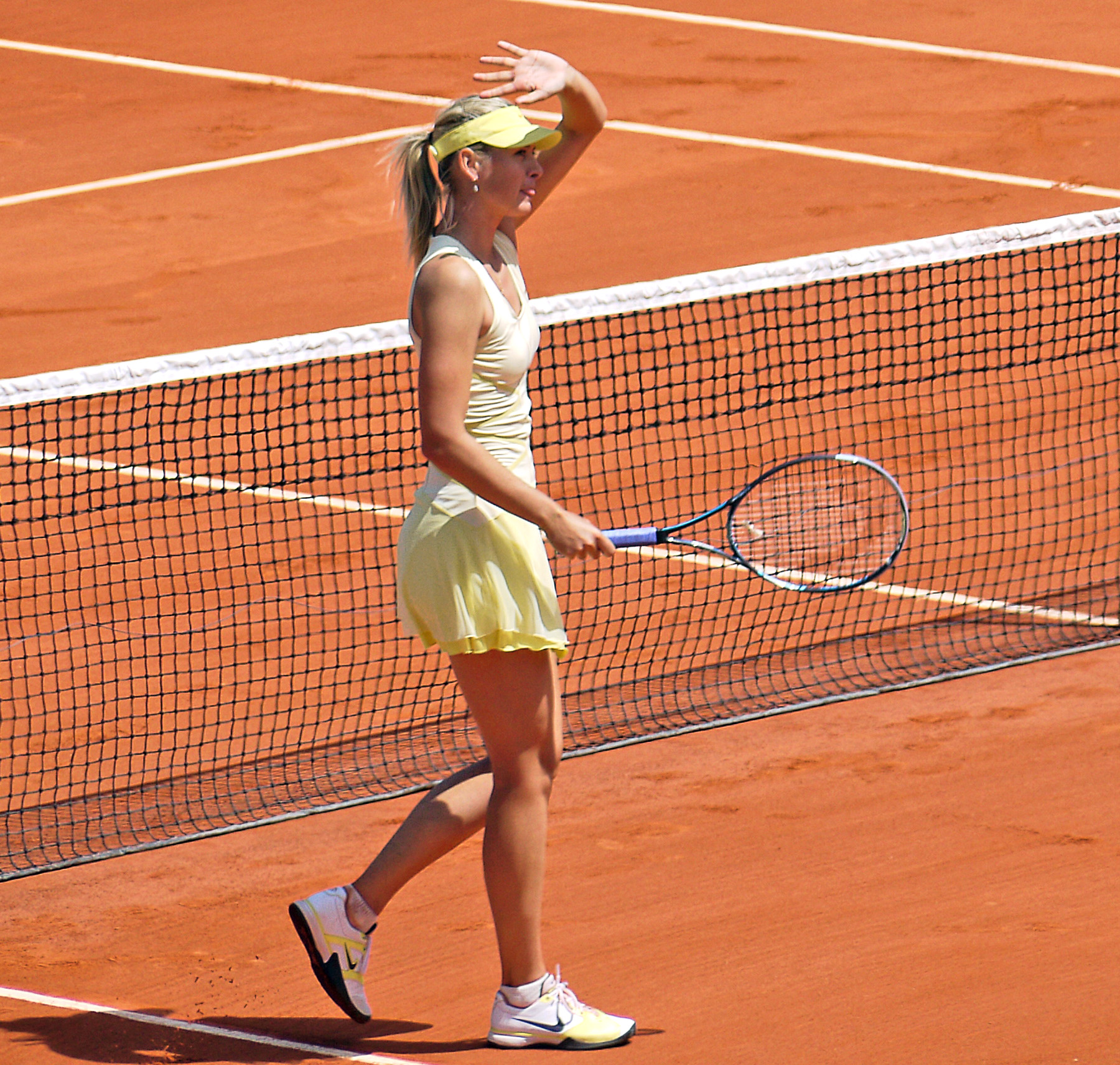
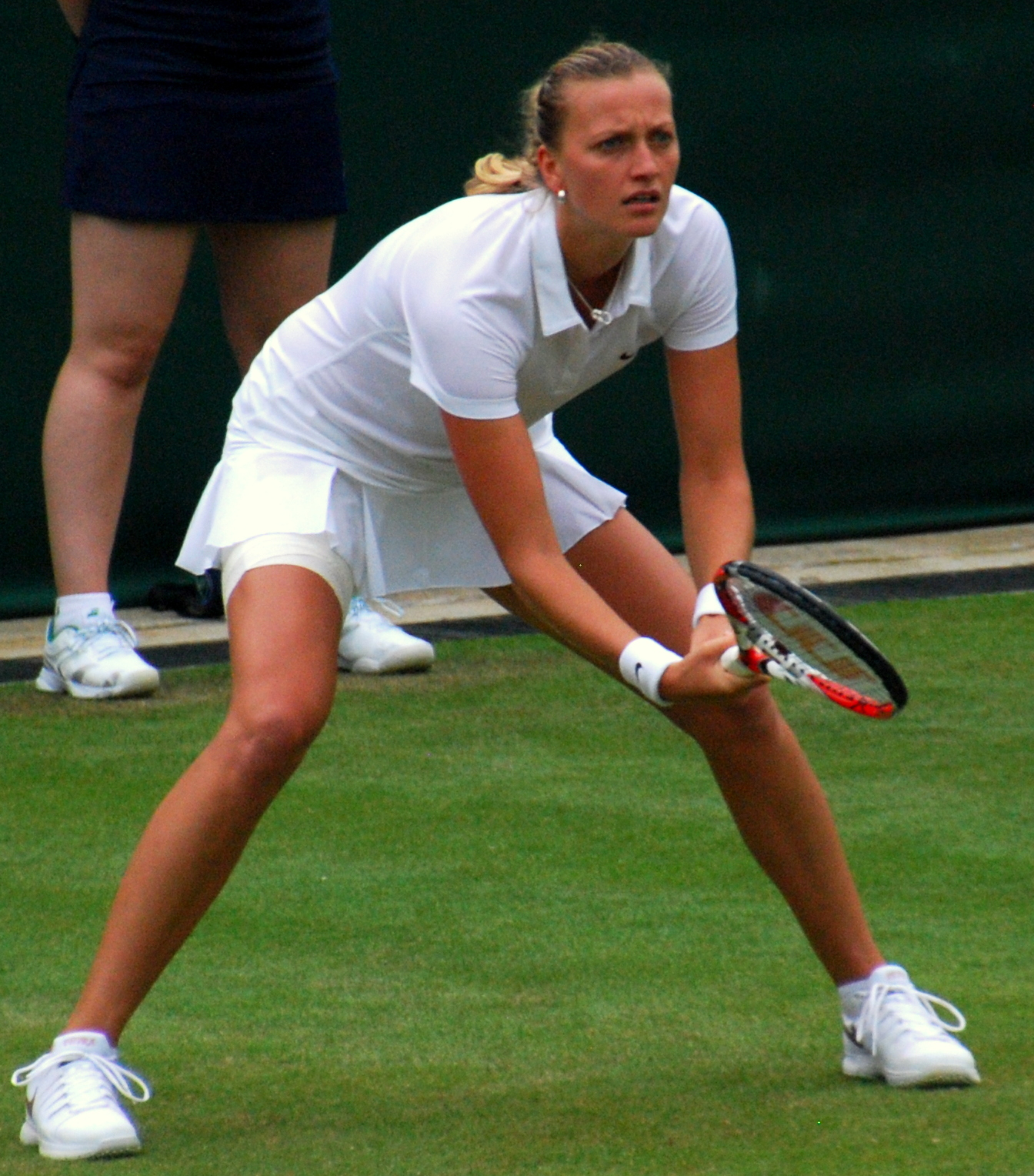
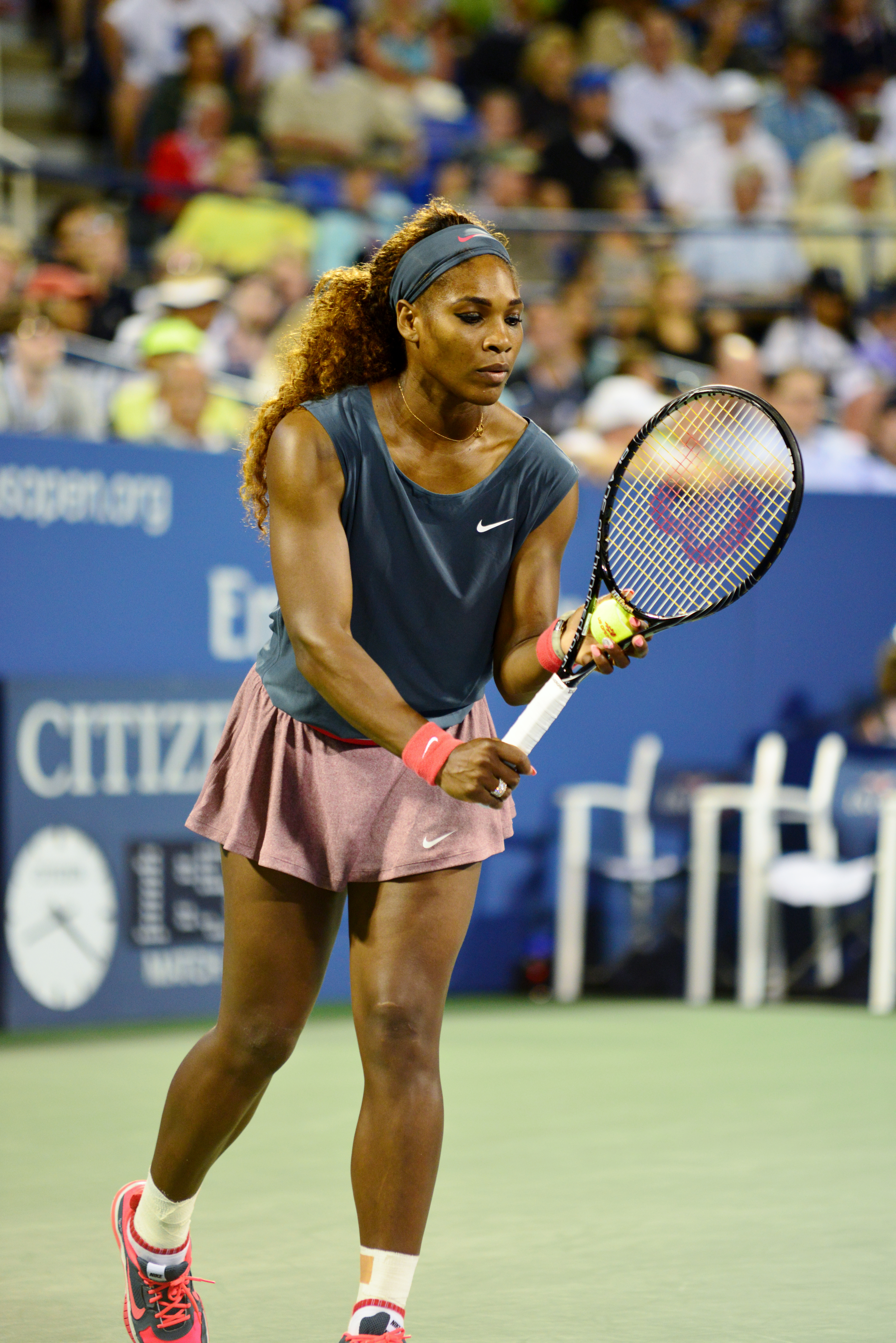
Li Na won her first Australian Open title and second major singles title after twice being runner-up. Maria Sharapova won her second French Open title and fifth major singles title overall in May. Petra Kvitová won her second major singles title at Wimbledon in July. Serena Williams won her record-tying sixth US Open and eighteenth major singles title at the 2014 US Open.

The 2014 WTA Tour was the elite professional tennis circuit organized by the Women's Tennis Association (WTA) for the 2014 tennis season. The 2014 WTA Tour calendar comprises the Grand Slam tournaments (supervised by the International Tennis Federation (ITF)), the WTA Premier tournaments (Premier Mandatory, Premier 5, and regular Premier), the WTA International tournaments, the Fed Cup (organized by the ITF), and the year-end championships (the WTA Tour Championships and the WTA Tournament of Champions). Also included in the 2014 calendar is the Hopman Cup, which was organized by the ITF and did not distribute ranking points.

== Schedule ==
This is the complete schedule of events on the 2014 calendar, with player progression documented from the quarterfinals stage.

Key

Grand Slam tournaments
Year-end championships
WTA Premier Mandatory
WTA Premier 5
WTA Premier
WTA International
Team events

=== January ===
Week	Tournament	Champions	Runners-up	Semifinalists	Quarterfinalists
30 Dec	Hopman Cup; Perth, Australia; ITF Mixed Teams Championships; Hard (i) – $1,000,000 – 8 teams (RR)	France; 2–1	Poland	Round robin (Group A) Canada; Italy; Australia	Round robin (Group B) Czech Republic; United States; Spain
30 Dec	Brisbane International; Brisbane, Australia; WTA Premier; Hard – $1,000,000 – 30S/16D; Singles – Doubles	(United States) Serena Williams; 6–4, 7–5	(Belarus) Victoria Azarenka	(Russia) Maria Sharapova (Serbia) Jelena Janković	(Slovakia) Dominika Cibulková (Estonia) Kaia Kanepi (Germany) Angelique Kerber (Switzerland) Stefanie Vögele
30 Dec	Brisbane International; Brisbane, Australia; WTA Premier; Hard – $1,000,000 – 30S/16D; Singles – Doubles	(Russia) Alla Kudryavtseva (Australia) Anastasia Rodionova; 6–3, 6–1	(France) Kristina Mladenovic (Kazakhstan) Galina Voskoboeva	(Russia) Maria Sharapova (Serbia) Jelena Janković	(Slovakia) Dominika Cibulková (Estonia) Kaia Kanepi (Germany) Angelique Kerber (Switzerland) Stefanie Vögele
30 Dec	Shenzhen Open; Shenzhen, China; WTA International; Hard – $500,000 – 32S/16D; Singles – Doubles	(China) Li Na; 6–4, 7–5	(China) Peng Shuai	(Germany) Annika Beck (United States) Vania King	(Romania) Monica Niculescu (Austria) Patricia Mayr-Achleitner (Slovakia) Jana Čepelová (Czech Republic) Barbora Záhlavová-Strýcová
30 Dec	Shenzhen Open; Shenzhen, China; WTA International; Hard – $500,000 – 32S/16D; Singles – Doubles	(Romania) Monica Niculescu (Czech Republic) Klára Zakopalová; 6–3, 6–4	(Ukraine) Lyudmyla Kichenok (Ukraine) Nadiia Kichenok	(Germany) Annika Beck (United States) Vania King	(Romania) Monica Niculescu (Austria) Patricia Mayr-Achleitner (Slovakia) Jana Čepelová (Czech Republic) Barbora Záhlavová-Strýcová
30 Dec	ASB Classic; Auckland, New Zealand; WTA International; Hard – $250,000 – 32S/16D; Singles – Doubles	(Serbia) Ana Ivanovic; 6–2, 5–7, 6–4	(United States) Venus Williams	(United States) Jamie Hampton (Belgium) Kirsten Flipkens	(United States) Lauren Davis (Spain) Garbiñe Muguruza (Japan) Sachie Ishizu (Japan) Kurumi Nara
30 Dec	ASB Classic; Auckland, New Zealand; WTA International; Hard – $250,000 – 32S/16D; Singles – Doubles	(Canada) Sharon Fichman (United States) Maria Sanchez; 2–6, 6–0, [10–4]	(Czech Republic) Lucie Hradecká (Netherlands) Michaëlla Krajicek	(United States) Jamie Hampton (Belgium) Kirsten Flipkens	(United States) Lauren Davis (Spain) Garbiñe Muguruza (Japan) Sachie Ishizu (Japan) Kurumi Nara
6 Jan	Apia International Sydney; Sydney, Australia; WTA Premier; Hard – $710,000 – 30S/16D; Singles – Doubles	(Bulgaria) Tsvetana Pironkova; 6–4, 6–4	(Germany) Angelique Kerber	(United States) Madison Keys (Czech Republic) Petra Kvitová	(United States) Bethanie Mattek-Sands (Spain) Carla Suárez Navarro (Italy) Sara Errani (Czech Republic) Lucie Šafářová
6 Jan	Apia International Sydney; Sydney, Australia; WTA Premier; Hard – $710,000 – 30S/16D; Singles – Doubles	(Hungary) Tímea Babos (Czech Republic) Lucie Šafářová; 7–5, 3–6, [10–7]	(Italy) Sara Errani (Italy) Roberta Vinci	(United States) Madison Keys (Czech Republic) Petra Kvitová	(United States) Bethanie Mattek-Sands (Spain) Carla Suárez Navarro (Italy) Sara Errani (Czech Republic) Lucie Šafářová
6 Jan	Hobart International; Hobart, Australia; WTA International; Hard – $250,000 – 32S/16D; Singles – Doubles	(Spain) Garbiñe Muguruza; 6–4, 6–0	(Czech Republic) Klára Zakopalová	(Australia) Samantha Stosur (Spain) Estrella Cabeza Candela	(Serbia) Bojana Jovanovski (United States) Alison Riske (Romania) Monica Niculescu (Belgium) Kirsten Flipkens
6 Jan	Hobart International; Hobart, Australia; WTA International; Hard – $250,000 – 32S/16D; Singles – Doubles	(Romania) Monica Niculescu (Czech Republic) Klára Zakopalová; 6–2, 6–7^{(5–7)}, [10–8]	(United States) Lisa Raymond (China) Zhang Shuai	(Australia) Samantha Stosur (Spain) Estrella Cabeza Candela	(Serbia) Bojana Jovanovski (United States) Alison Riske (Romania) Monica Niculescu (Belgium) Kirsten Flipkens
13 Jan; 20 Jan	Australian Open; Melbourne, Australia; Grand Slam; Hard – $12,122,762; 128S/64D/32X; Singles – Doubles – Mixed doubles	(China) Li Na; 7–6^{(7–3)}, 6–0	(Slovakia) Dominika Cibulková	(Canada) Eugenie Bouchard (Poland) Agnieszka Radwańska	(Serbia) Ana Ivanovic (Italy) Flavia Pennetta (Romania) Simona Halep (Belarus) Victoria Azarenka
13 Jan; 20 Jan	Australian Open; Melbourne, Australia; Grand Slam; Hard – $12,122,762; 128S/64D/32X; Singles – Doubles – Mixed doubles	(Italy) Sara Errani (Italy) Roberta Vinci; 6–4, 3–6, 7–5	(Russia) Ekaterina Makarova (Russia) Elena Vesnina	(Canada) Eugenie Bouchard (Poland) Agnieszka Radwańska	(Serbia) Ana Ivanovic (Italy) Flavia Pennetta (Romania) Simona Halep (Belarus) Victoria Azarenka
13 Jan; 20 Jan	Australian Open; Melbourne, Australia; Grand Slam; Hard – $12,122,762; 128S/64D/32X; Singles – Doubles – Mixed doubles	(France) Kristina Mladenovic (Canada) Daniel Nestor; 6–3, 6–2	(India) Sania Mirza (Romania) Horia Tecău	(Canada) Eugenie Bouchard (Poland) Agnieszka Radwańska	(Serbia) Ana Ivanovic (Italy) Flavia Pennetta (Romania) Simona Halep (Belarus) Victoria Azarenka
27 Jan	Open GDF Suez; Paris, France; WTA Premier; Hard (i) – $710,000 – 28S/16D; Singles – Doubles	(Russia) Anastasia Pavlyuchenkova; 3–6, 6–2, 6–3	(Italy) Sara Errani	(Russia) Maria Sharapova (France) Alizé Cornet	(Belgium) Kirsten Flipkens (Germany) Angelique Kerber (Ukraine) Elina Svitolina (Germany) Andrea Petkovic
27 Jan	Open GDF Suez; Paris, France; WTA Premier; Hard (i) – $710,000 – 28S/16D; Singles – Doubles	(Germany) Anna-Lena Grönefeld (Czech Republic) Květa Peschke; 6–7^{(7–9)}, 6–4, [10–5]	(Hungary) Tímea Babos (France) Kristina Mladenovic	(Russia) Maria Sharapova (France) Alizé Cornet	(Belgium) Kirsten Flipkens (Germany) Angelique Kerber (Ukraine) Elina Svitolina (Germany) Andrea Petkovic
27 Jan	PTT Pattaya Open; Pattaya, Thailand; WTA International; Hard – $250,000 – 32S/16D; Singles – Doubles	(Russia) Ekaterina Makarova; 6–3, 7–6^{(9–7)}	(Czech Republic) Karolína Plíšková	(Czech Republic) Andrea Hlaváčková (Germany) Julia Görges	(China) Peng Shuai (Japan) Kimiko Date-Krumm (Romania) Sorana Cîrstea (Russia) Elena Vesnina
27 Jan	PTT Pattaya Open; Pattaya, Thailand; WTA International; Hard – $250,000 – 32S/16D; Singles – Doubles	(China) Peng Shuai (China) Zhang Shuai; 3–6, 7–6^{(7–5)}, [10–6]	(Russia) Alla Kudryavtseva (Australia) Anastasia Rodionova	(Czech Republic) Andrea Hlaváčková (Germany) Julia Görges	(China) Peng Shuai (Japan) Kimiko Date-Krumm (Romania) Sorana Cîrstea (Russia) Elena Vesnina

=== February ===
Week	Tournament	Champions	Runners-up	Semifinalists	Quarterfinalists
3 Feb	Fed Cup Quarterfinals; Cleveland, United States – hard (i); Sevilla, Spain – Clay (red); Bratislava, Slovakia – hard (i); Hobart, Australia – hard	Quarterfinals winners Italy 3–1; Czech Republic 3–2; Germany 3–1; Australia 4–0	Quarterfinals losers United States; Spain; Slovakia; Russia		
10 Feb	Qatar Total Open; Doha, Qatar; WTA Premier 5 Hard – $2,369,000 – 56S/16D; Singles – Doubles	(Romania) Simona Halep; 6–2, 6–3	(Germany) Angelique Kerber	(Serbia) Jelena Janković (Poland) Agnieszka Radwańska	(Czech Republic) Petra Cetkovská (Czech Republic) Petra Kvitová (Italy) Sara Errani (Belgium) Yanina Wickmayer
10 Feb	Qatar Total Open; Doha, Qatar; WTA Premier 5 Hard – $2,369,000 – 56S/16D; Singles – Doubles	(Chinese Taipei) Hsieh Su-wei (China) Peng Shuai; 6–4, 6–0	(Czech Republic) Květa Peschke (Slovenia) Katarina Srebotnik	(Serbia) Jelena Janković (Poland) Agnieszka Radwańska	(Czech Republic) Petra Cetkovská (Czech Republic) Petra Kvitová (Italy) Sara Errani (Belgium) Yanina Wickmayer
17 Feb	Dubai Tennis Championships; Dubai, United Arab Emirates; WTA Premier; Hard – $2,000,000 – 28S/16D; Singles – Doubles	(United States) Venus Williams; 6–3, 6–0	(France) Alizé Cornet	(United States) Serena Williams (Denmark) Caroline Wozniacki	(Serbia) Jelena Janković (Spain) Carla Suárez Navarro (Romania) Sorana Cîrstea (Italy) Flavia Pennetta
17 Feb	Dubai Tennis Championships; Dubai, United Arab Emirates; WTA Premier; Hard – $2,000,000 – 28S/16D; Singles – Doubles	(Russia) Alla Kudryavtseva (Australia) Anastasia Rodionova; 6–2, 5–7, [10–8]	(United States) Raquel Kops-Jones (United States) Abigail Spears	(United States) Serena Williams (Denmark) Caroline Wozniacki	(Serbia) Jelena Janković (Spain) Carla Suárez Navarro (Romania) Sorana Cîrstea (Italy) Flavia Pennetta
17 Feb	Rio Open; Rio de Janeiro, Brazil; WTA International; Clay (red) – $250,000 – 32S/16D; Singles – Doubles	(Japan) Kurumi Nara; 6–1, 4–6, 6–1	(Czech Republic) Klára Zakopalová	(Brazil) Teliana Pereira (Italy) Nastassja Burnett	(Poland) Katarzyna Piter (Romania) Irina-Camelia Begu (Argentina) Paula Ormaechea (Spain) Lourdes Domínguez Lino
17 Feb	Rio Open; Rio de Janeiro, Brazil; WTA International; Clay (red) – $250,000 – 32S/16D; Singles – Doubles	(Romania) Irina-Camelia Begu (Argentina) María Irigoyen; 6–2, 6–0	(Sweden) Johanna Larsson (South Africa) Chanelle Scheepers	(Brazil) Teliana Pereira (Italy) Nastassja Burnett	(Poland) Katarzyna Piter (Romania) Irina-Camelia Begu (Argentina) Paula Ormaechea (Spain) Lourdes Domínguez Lino
24 Feb	Abierto Mexicano TELCEL; Acapulco, Mexico; WTA International; Hard – $250,000 – 32S/16D; Singles – Doubles	(Slovakia) Dominika Cibulková; 7–6^{(7–3)}, 4–6, 6–4	(United States) Christina McHale	(China) Zhang Shuai (France) Caroline Garcia	(New Zealand) Marina Erakovic (Croatia) Ajla Tomljanović (Estonia) Kaia Kanepi (Canada) Eugenie Bouchard
24 Feb	Abierto Mexicano TELCEL; Acapulco, Mexico; WTA International; Hard – $250,000 – 32S/16D; Singles – Doubles	(France) Kristina Mladenovic (Kazakhstan) Galina Voskoboeva; 6–3, 2–6, [10–5]	(Czech Republic) Petra Cetkovská (Czech Republic) Iveta Melzer	(China) Zhang Shuai (France) Caroline Garcia	(New Zealand) Marina Erakovic (Croatia) Ajla Tomljanović (Estonia) Kaia Kanepi (Canada) Eugenie Bouchard
24 Feb	Brasil Tennis Cup; Florianópolis, Brazil; WTA International; Hard – $250,000 – 32S/16D; Singles – Doubles	(Czech Republic) Klára Zakopalová; 4–6, 7–5, 6–0	(Spain) Garbiñe Muguruza	(Spain) Carla Suárez Navarro (Kazakhstan) Yaroslava Shvedova	(Romania) Monica Niculescu (Romania) Alexandra Dulgheru (Romania) Alexandra Cadanțu (Belgium) Alison Van Uytvanck
24 Feb	Brasil Tennis Cup; Florianópolis, Brazil; WTA International; Hard – $250,000 – 32S/16D; Singles – Doubles	(Spain) Anabel Medina Garrigues (Kazakhstan) Yaroslava Shvedova; 7–6^{(7–1)}, 2–6, [10–3]	(Italy) Francesca Schiavone (Spain) Sílvia Soler Espinosa	(Spain) Carla Suárez Navarro (Kazakhstan) Yaroslava Shvedova	(Romania) Monica Niculescu (Romania) Alexandra Dulgheru (Romania) Alexandra Cadanțu (Belgium) Alison Van Uytvanck

=== March ===
Week	Tournament	Champions	Runners-up	Semifinalists	Quarterfinalists
3 Mar; 10 Mar	BNP Paribas Open; Indian Wells, United States; WTA Premier Mandatory; Hard – $5,946,740 – 96S/32D; Singles – Doubles	(Italy) Flavia Pennetta; 6–2, 6–1	(Poland) Agnieszka Radwańska	(China) Li Na (Romania) Simona Halep	(Slovakia) Dominika Cibulková (United States) Sloane Stephens (Australia) Casey Dellacqua (Serbia) Jelena Janković
3 Mar; 10 Mar	BNP Paribas Open; Indian Wells, United States; WTA Premier Mandatory; Hard – $5,946,740 – 96S/32D; Singles – Doubles	(Chinese Taipei) Hsieh Su-wei (China) Peng Shuai; 7–6^{(7–5)}, 6–2	(Zimbabwe) Cara Black (India) Sania Mirza	(China) Li Na (Romania) Simona Halep	(Slovakia) Dominika Cibulková (United States) Sloane Stephens (Australia) Casey Dellacqua (Serbia) Jelena Janković
17 Mar; 24 Mar	Sony Open Tennis; Key Biscayne, United States; WTA Premier Mandatory; Hard – $5,427,105 – 96S/32D; Singles – Doubles	(United States) Serena Williams; 7–5, 6–1	(China) Li Na	(Russia) Maria Sharapova (Slovakia) Dominika Cibulková	(Germany) Angelique Kerber (Czech Republic) Petra Kvitová (Poland) Agnieszka Radwańska (Denmark) Caroline Wozniacki
17 Mar; 24 Mar	Sony Open Tennis; Key Biscayne, United States; WTA Premier Mandatory; Hard – $5,427,105 – 96S/32D; Singles – Doubles	(Switzerland) Martina Hingis (Germany) Sabine Lisicki; 4–6, 6–4, [10–5]	(Russia) Ekaterina Makarova (Russia) Elena Vesnina	(Russia) Maria Sharapova (Slovakia) Dominika Cibulková	(Germany) Angelique Kerber (Czech Republic) Petra Kvitová (Poland) Agnieszka Radwańska (Denmark) Caroline Wozniacki
31 Mar	Family Circle Cup; Charleston, United States; WTA Premier; Clay – $710,000 (Green) – 56S/16D; Singles – Doubles	(Germany) Andrea Petkovic; 7–5, 6–2	(Slovakia) Jana Čepelová	(Switzerland) Belinda Bencic (Canada) Eugenie Bouchard	(Slovakia) Daniela Hantuchová (Italy) Sara Errani (Czech Republic) Lucie Šafářová (Serbia) Jelena Janković
31 Mar	Family Circle Cup; Charleston, United States; WTA Premier; Clay – $710,000 (Green) – 56S/16D; Singles – Doubles	(Spain) Anabel Medina Garrigues (Kazakhstan) Yaroslava Shvedova; 7–6^{(7–4)}, 6–2	(Chinese Taipei) Chan Hao-ching (Chinese Taipei) Chan Yung-jan	(Switzerland) Belinda Bencic (Canada) Eugenie Bouchard	(Slovakia) Daniela Hantuchová (Italy) Sara Errani (Czech Republic) Lucie Šafářová (Serbia) Jelena Janković
31 Mar	Monterrey Open; Monterrey, Mexico; WTA International; Hard – $500,000 – 32S/16D; Singles – Doubles	(Serbia) Ana Ivanovic; 6–2, 6–1	(Serbia) Jovana Jakšić	(Japan) Kimiko Date-Krumm (Denmark) Caroline Wozniacki	(Puerto Rico) Monica Puig (United States) Julia Boserup (Czech Republic) Karolína Plíšková (Slovakia) Magdaléna Rybáriková
31 Mar	Monterrey Open; Monterrey, Mexico; WTA International; Hard – $500,000 – 32S/16D; Singles – Doubles	(Croatia) Darija Jurak (United States) Megan Moulton-Levy; 7–6^{(7–5)}, 3–6, [11–9]	(Hungary) Tímea Babos (Belarus) Olga Govortsova	(Japan) Kimiko Date-Krumm (Denmark) Caroline Wozniacki	(Puerto Rico) Monica Puig (United States) Julia Boserup (Czech Republic) Karolína Plíšková (Slovakia) Magdaléna Rybáriková

=== April ===
Week	Tournament	Champions	Runners-up	Semifinalists	Quarterfinalists
7 Apr	BNP Paribas Katowice Open; Katowice, Poland; WTA International; Hard (i) – $250,000 – 32S/16D; Singles – Doubles	(France) Alizé Cornet; 7–6^{(7–3)}, 5–7, 7–5	(Italy) Camila Giorgi	(Poland) Agnieszka Radwańska (Spain) Carla Suárez Navarro	(Austria) Yvonne Meusburger (Czech Republic) Klára Koukalová (Slovakia) Magdaléna Rybáriková (Israel) Shahar Pe'er
7 Apr	BNP Paribas Katowice Open; Katowice, Poland; WTA International; Hard (i) – $250,000 – 32S/16D; Singles – Doubles	(Ukraine) Yuliya Beygelzimer (Ukraine) Olga Savchuk; 6–4, 5–7, [10–7]	(Czech Republic) Klára Koukalová (Romania) Monica Niculescu	(Poland) Agnieszka Radwańska (Spain) Carla Suárez Navarro	(Austria) Yvonne Meusburger (Czech Republic) Klára Koukalová (Slovakia) Magdaléna Rybáriková (Israel) Shahar Pe'er
7 Apr	Copa Colsanitas; Bogotá, Colombia; WTA International; Clay (red) – $250,000 – 32S/16D; Singles – Doubles	(France) Caroline Garcia; 6–3, 6–4	(Serbia) Jelena Janković	(South Africa) Chanelle Scheepers (United States) Vania King	(Spain) Lara Arruabarrena (Spain) Lourdes Domínguez Lino (Switzerland) Romina Oprandi (Colombia) Mariana Duque Mariño
7 Apr	Copa Colsanitas; Bogotá, Colombia; WTA International; Clay (red) – $250,000 – 32S/16D; Singles – Doubles	(Spain) Lara Arruabarrena (France) Caroline Garcia; 7–6^{(7–5)}, 6–4	(United States) Vania King (South Africa) Chanelle Scheepers	(South Africa) Chanelle Scheepers (United States) Vania King	(Spain) Lara Arruabarrena (Spain) Lourdes Domínguez Lino (Switzerland) Romina Oprandi (Colombia) Mariana Duque Mariño
14 Apr	Fed Cup Semifinals; Brisbane, Australia – hard Ostrava, Czech Republic – hard (i)	Semifinals winners Czech Republic 4–0; Germany 3–1	Semifinals losers Italy; Australia		
14 Apr	Malaysian Open; Kuala Lumpur, Malaysia; WTA International; Hard – $250,000 – 32S/16D; Singles – Doubles	(Croatia) Donna Vekić; 5–7, 7–5, 7–6^{(7–4)}	(Slovakia) Dominika Cibulková	(Czech Republic) Karolína Plíšková (China) Zhang Shuai	(Kazakhstan) Zarina Diyas (Turkey) Çağla Büyükakçay (Austria) Patricia Mayr-Achleitner (Poland) Magda Linette
14 Apr	Malaysian Open; Kuala Lumpur, Malaysia; WTA International; Hard – $250,000 – 32S/16D; Singles – Doubles	(Hungary) Tímea Babos (Chinese Taipei) Chan Hao-ching; 6–3, 6–4	(Chinese Taipei) Chan Yung-jan (China) Zheng Saisai	(Czech Republic) Karolína Plíšková (China) Zhang Shuai	(Kazakhstan) Zarina Diyas (Turkey) Çağla Büyükakçay (Austria) Patricia Mayr-Achleitner (Poland) Magda Linette
21 Apr	Porsche Tennis Grand Prix; Stuttgart, Germany; WTA Premier; Clay (red) (i) – $710,000 – 28S/16D; Singles – Doubles	(Russia) Maria Sharapova; 3–6, 6–4, 6–1	(Serbia) Ana Ivanovic	(Italy) Sara Errani (Serbia) Jelena Janković	(Poland) Agnieszka Radwańska (Spain) Carla Suárez Navarro (Russia) Alisa Kleybanova (Russia) Svetlana Kuznetsova
21 Apr	Porsche Tennis Grand Prix; Stuttgart, Germany; WTA Premier; Clay (red) (i) – $710,000 – 28S/16D; Singles – Doubles	(Italy) Sara Errani (Italy) Roberta Vinci; 6–2, 6–3	(Zimbabwe) Cara Black (India) Sania Mirza	(Italy) Sara Errani (Serbia) Jelena Janković	(Poland) Agnieszka Radwańska (Spain) Carla Suárez Navarro (Russia) Alisa Kleybanova (Russia) Svetlana Kuznetsova
21 Apr	Grand Prix SAR La Princesse Lalla Meryem; Marrakesh, Morocco; WTA International; Clay (red) – $250,000 – 32S/16D; Singles – Doubles	(Spain) María Teresa Torró Flor; 6–3, 3–6, 6–3	(Switzerland) Romina Oprandi	(Slovakia) Daniela Hantuchová (Spain) Garbiñe Muguruza	(China) Peng Shuai (Austria) Yvonne Meusburger (Slovenia) Polona Hercog (Israel) Shahar Pe'er
21 Apr	Grand Prix SAR La Princesse Lalla Meryem; Marrakesh, Morocco; WTA International; Clay (red) – $250,000 – 32S/16D; Singles – Doubles	(Spain) Garbiñe Muguruza (Switzerland) Romina Oprandi; 4–6, 6–2, [11–9]	(Poland) Katarzyna Piter (Ukraine) Maryna Zanevska	(Slovakia) Daniela Hantuchová (Spain) Garbiñe Muguruza	(China) Peng Shuai (Austria) Yvonne Meusburger (Slovenia) Polona Hercog (Israel) Shahar Pe'er
28 Apr	Portugal Open; Oeiras, Portugal; WTA International; Clay (red) – $250,000 – 32S/16D; Singles – Doubles	(Spain) Carla Suárez Navarro; 6–4, 3–6, 6–4	(Russia) Svetlana Kuznetsova	(Romania) Irina-Camelia Begu (Russia) Elena Vesnina	(Slovenia) Polona Hercog (Switzerland) Timea Bacsinszky (Italy) Roberta Vinci (Canada) Eugenie Bouchard
28 Apr	Portugal Open; Oeiras, Portugal; WTA International; Clay (red) – $250,000 – 32S/16D; Singles – Doubles	(Zimbabwe) Cara Black (India) Sania Mirza; 6–4, 6–3	(Czech Republic) Eva Hrdinová (Russia) Valeria Solovyeva	(Romania) Irina-Camelia Begu (Russia) Elena Vesnina	(Slovenia) Polona Hercog (Switzerland) Timea Bacsinszky (Italy) Roberta Vinci (Canada) Eugenie Bouchard

=== May ===
Week	Tournament	Champions	Runners-up	Semifinalists	Quarterfinalists
5 May	Mutua Madrid Open; Madrid, Spain; WTA Premier Mandatory; Clay (red) – $4,942,700 – 64S/28D; Singles – Doubles	(Russia) Maria Sharapova; 1–6, 6–2, 6–3	(Romania) Simona Halep	(Czech Republic) Petra Kvitová (Poland) Agnieszka Radwańska	(United States) Serena Williams (Serbia) Ana Ivanovic (France) Caroline Garcia (China) Li Na
5 May	Mutua Madrid Open; Madrid, Spain; WTA Premier Mandatory; Clay (red) – $4,942,700 – 64S/28D; Singles – Doubles	(Italy) Sara Errani (Italy) Roberta Vinci; 6–4, 6–3	(Spain) Garbiñe Muguruza (Spain) Carla Suárez Navarro	(Czech Republic) Petra Kvitová (Poland) Agnieszka Radwańska	(United States) Serena Williams (Serbia) Ana Ivanovic (France) Caroline Garcia (China) Li Na
12 May	Internazionali BNL d'Italia; Rome, Italy; WTA Premier 5 Clay (red) – $2,369,000– 56S/28D; Singles – Doubles	(United States) Serena Williams; 6–3, 6–0	(Italy) Sara Errani	(Serbia) Ana Ivanovic (Serbia) Jelena Janković	(China) Zhang Shuai (Spain) Carla Suárez Navarro (Poland) Agnieszka Radwańska (China) Li Na
12 May	Internazionali BNL d'Italia; Rome, Italy; WTA Premier 5 Clay (red) – $2,369,000– 56S/28D; Singles – Doubles	(Czech Republic) Květa Peschke (Slovenia) Katarina Srebotnik; 4–0, retired	(Italy) Sara Errani (Italy) Roberta Vinci	(Serbia) Ana Ivanovic (Serbia) Jelena Janković	(China) Zhang Shuai (Spain) Carla Suárez Navarro (Poland) Agnieszka Radwańska (China) Li Na
19 May	Nürnberger Versicherungscup; Nürnberg, Germany; WTA International; Clay (red) – $250,000 – 32S/16D; Singles – Doubles	(Canada) Eugenie Bouchard; 6–2, 4–6, 6–3	(Czech Republic) Karolína Plíšková	(Ukraine) Elina Svitolina (Italy) Karin Knapp	(Germany) Angelique Kerber (Germany) Mona Barthel (France) Caroline Garcia (Kazakhstan) Yaroslava Shvedova
19 May	Nürnberger Versicherungscup; Nürnberg, Germany; WTA International; Clay (red) – $250,000 – 32S/16D; Singles – Doubles	(Netherlands) Michaëlla Krajicek (Czech Republic) Karolína Plíšková; 6–0, 4–6, [10–6]	(Romania) Raluca Olaru (Israel) Shahar Pe'er	(Ukraine) Elina Svitolina (Italy) Karin Knapp	(Germany) Angelique Kerber (Germany) Mona Barthel (France) Caroline Garcia (Kazakhstan) Yaroslava Shvedova
19 May	Internationaux de Strasbourg; Strasbourg, France; WTA International; Clay (red) – $250,000 – 32S/16D; Singles – Doubles	(Puerto Rico) Monica Puig; 6–4, 6–3	(Spain) Sílvia Soler Espinosa	(United States) Madison Keys (United States) Christina McHale	(Germany) Julia Görges (Germany) Andrea Petkovic (Kazakhstan) Zarina Diyas (Italy) Camila Giorgi
19 May	Internationaux de Strasbourg; Strasbourg, France; WTA International; Clay (red) – $250,000 – 32S/16D; Singles – Doubles	(Australia) Ashleigh Barty (Australia) Casey Dellacqua; 4–6, 7–5, [10–4]	(Argentina) Tatiana Búa (Chile) Daniela Seguel	(United States) Madison Keys (United States) Christina McHale	(Germany) Julia Görges (Germany) Andrea Petkovic (Kazakhstan) Zarina Diyas (Italy) Camila Giorgi
26 May; 2 Jun	French Open; Paris, France; Grand Slam; Clay (red) – $11,315,740; 128S/64D/32X; Singles – Doubles – Mixed doubles	(Russia) Maria Sharapova; 6–4, 6–7^{(5–7)}, 6–4	(Romania) Simona Halep	(Canada) Eugenie Bouchard (Germany) Andrea Petkovic	(Spain) Garbiñe Muguruza (Spain) Carla Suárez Navarro (Russia) Svetlana Kuznetsova (Italy) Sara Errani
26 May; 2 Jun	French Open; Paris, France; Grand Slam; Clay (red) – $11,315,740; 128S/64D/32X; Singles – Doubles – Mixed doubles	(Chinese Taipei) Hsieh Su-wei (China) Peng Shuai; 6–4, 6–1	(Italy) Sara Errani (Italy) Roberta Vinci	(Canada) Eugenie Bouchard (Germany) Andrea Petkovic	(Spain) Garbiñe Muguruza (Spain) Carla Suárez Navarro (Russia) Svetlana Kuznetsova (Italy) Sara Errani
26 May; 2 Jun	French Open; Paris, France; Grand Slam; Clay (red) – $11,315,740; 128S/64D/32X; Singles – Doubles – Mixed doubles	(Germany) Anna-Lena Grönefeld (Netherlands) Jean-Julien Rojer; 4–6, 6–2, [10–7]	(Germany) Julia Görges (Serbia) Nenad Zimonjić	(Canada) Eugenie Bouchard (Germany) Andrea Petkovic	(Spain) Garbiñe Muguruza (Spain) Carla Suárez Navarro (Russia) Svetlana Kuznetsova (Italy) Sara Errani

=== June ===
Week	Tournament	Champions	Runners-up	Semifinalists	Quarterfinalists
9 Jun	Aegon Classic; Birmingham, Great Britain; WTA Premier; Grass – $710,000 – 56S/16D; Singles – Doubles	(Serbia) Ana Ivanovic; 6–3, 6–2	(Czech Republic) Barbora Záhlavová-Strýcová	(China) Zhang Shuai (Australia) Casey Dellacqua	(Czech Republic) Klára Koukalová (United States) Sloane Stephens (Belgium) Kirsten Flipkens (Japan) Kimiko Date-Krumm
9 Jun	Aegon Classic; Birmingham, Great Britain; WTA Premier; Grass – $710,000 – 56S/16D; Singles – Doubles	(United States) Raquel Kops-Jones (United States) Abigail Spears; 7–6^{(7–1)}, 6–1	(Australia) Ashleigh Barty (Australia) Casey Dellacqua	(China) Zhang Shuai (Australia) Casey Dellacqua	(Czech Republic) Klára Koukalová (United States) Sloane Stephens (Belgium) Kirsten Flipkens (Japan) Kimiko Date-Krumm
16 Jun	Aegon International; Eastbourne, Great Britain; WTA Premier; Grass – $710,000 – 32S/16D; Singles – Doubles	(United States) Madison Keys; 6–3, 3–6, 7–5	(Germany) Angelique Kerber	(Denmark) Caroline Wozniacki (United Kingdom) Heather Watson	(Russia) Ekaterina Makarova (Italy) Camila Giorgi (United States) Lauren Davis (Czech Republic) Petra Kvitová
16 Jun	Aegon International; Eastbourne, Great Britain; WTA Premier; Grass – $710,000 – 32S/16D; Singles – Doubles	(Chinese Taipei) Chan Hao-ching (Chinese Taipei) Chan Yung-jan; 6–3, 5–7, [10–7]	(Switzerland) Martina Hingis (Italy) Flavia Pennetta	(Denmark) Caroline Wozniacki (United Kingdom) Heather Watson	(Russia) Ekaterina Makarova (Italy) Camila Giorgi (United States) Lauren Davis (Czech Republic) Petra Kvitová
16 Jun	Topshelf Open 's-Hertogenbosch, Netherlands; WTA International; Grass – $250,000 – 32S/16D; Singles – Doubles	(United States) CoCo Vandeweghe; 6–2, 6–4	(China) Zheng Jie	(Slovakia) Magdaléna Rybáriková (Czech Republic) Klára Koukalová	(Germany) Annika Beck (Ukraine) Elina Svitolina (Spain) Garbiñe Muguruza (Kazakhstan) Yaroslava Shvedova
16 Jun	Topshelf Open 's-Hertogenbosch, Netherlands; WTA International; Grass – $250,000 – 32S/16D; Singles – Doubles	(New Zealand) Marina Erakovic (Spain) Arantxa Parra Santonja; 0–6, 7–6^{(7–5)}, [10–8]	(Netherlands) Michaëlla Krajicek (France) Kristina Mladenovic	(Slovakia) Magdaléna Rybáriková (Czech Republic) Klára Koukalová	(Germany) Annika Beck (Ukraine) Elina Svitolina (Spain) Garbiñe Muguruza (Kazakhstan) Yaroslava Shvedova
23 Jun; 30 Jun	The Championships, Wimbledon; London, Great Britain; Grand Slam; Grass – $11,174,883; 128S/64D/48X; Singles – Doubles – Mixed doubles	(Czech Republic) Petra Kvitová; 6–3, 6–0	(Canada) Eugenie Bouchard	(Romania) Simona Halep (Czech Republic) Lucie Šafářová	(Germany) Angelique Kerber (Germany) Sabine Lisicki (Russia) Ekaterina Makarova (Czech Republic) Barbora Záhlavová-Strýcová
23 Jun; 30 Jun	The Championships, Wimbledon; London, Great Britain; Grand Slam; Grass – $11,174,883; 128S/64D/48X; Singles – Doubles – Mixed doubles	(Italy) Sara Errani (Italy) Roberta Vinci; 6–1, 6–3	(Hungary) Tímea Babos (France) Kristina Mladenovic	(Romania) Simona Halep (Czech Republic) Lucie Šafářová	(Germany) Angelique Kerber (Germany) Sabine Lisicki (Russia) Ekaterina Makarova (Czech Republic) Barbora Záhlavová-Strýcová
23 Jun; 30 Jun	The Championships, Wimbledon; London, Great Britain; Grand Slam; Grass – $11,174,883; 128S/64D/48X; Singles – Doubles – Mixed doubles	(Australia) Samantha Stosur (Serbia) Nenad Zimonjić; 6–4, 6–2	(Chinese Taipei) Chan Hao-ching (Belarus) Max Mirnyi	(Romania) Simona Halep (Czech Republic) Lucie Šafářová	(Germany) Angelique Kerber (Germany) Sabine Lisicki (Russia) Ekaterina Makarova (Czech Republic) Barbora Záhlavová-Strýcová

=== July ===
Week	Tournament	Champions	Runners-up	Semifinalists	Quarterfinalists
7 Jul	BRD Bucharest Open; Bucharest, Romania; WTA International; Clay (red) – $250,000 – 32S/16D; Singles – Doubles	(Romania) Simona Halep; 6–1, 6–3	(Italy) Roberta Vinci	(Romania) Monica Niculescu (Slovakia) Kristína Kučová	(Spain) Lara Arruabarrena (Slovenia) Polona Hercog (Montenegro) Danka Kovinić (Czech Republic) Petra Cetkovská
7 Jul	BRD Bucharest Open; Bucharest, Romania; WTA International; Clay (red) – $250,000 – 32S/16D; Singles – Doubles	(Romania) Elena Bogdan (Romania) Alexandra Cadanțu; 6–4, 3–6, [10–5]	(Turkey) Çağla Büyükakçay (Italy) Karin Knapp	(Romania) Monica Niculescu (Slovakia) Kristína Kučová	(Spain) Lara Arruabarrena (Slovenia) Polona Hercog (Montenegro) Danka Kovinić (Czech Republic) Petra Cetkovská
7 Jul	Gastein Ladies; Bad Gastein, Austria; WTA International; Clay (red) – $250,000 – 32S/16D; Singles – Doubles	(Germany) Andrea Petkovic; 6–3, 6–3	(United States) Shelby Rogers	(United States) Grace Min (Italy) Sara Errani	(Czech Republic) Karolína Plíšková (Switzerland) Stefanie Vögele (Italy) Camila Giorgi (South Africa) Chanelle Scheepers
7 Jul	Gastein Ladies; Bad Gastein, Austria; WTA International; Clay (red) – $250,000 – 32S/16D; Singles – Doubles	(Czech Republic) Karolína Plíšková (Czech Republic) Kristýna Plíšková; 4–6, 6–3, [10–6]	(Slovenia) Andreja Klepač (Spain) María Teresa Torró Flor	(United States) Grace Min (Italy) Sara Errani	(Czech Republic) Karolína Plíšková (Switzerland) Stefanie Vögele (Italy) Camila Giorgi (South Africa) Chanelle Scheepers
14 Jul	Swedish Open; Båstad, Sweden; WTA International; Clay (red) – $250,000 – 32S/16D; Singles – Doubles	(Germany) Mona Barthel; 6–3, 7–6^{(7–3)}	(South Africa) Chanelle Scheepers	(Slovakia) Jana Čepelová (Spain) Sílvia Soler Espinosa	(Kazakhstan) Yulia Putintseva (Spain) Lara Arruabarrena (Estonia) Kaia Kanepi (Russia) Alexandra Panova
14 Jul	Swedish Open; Båstad, Sweden; WTA International; Clay (red) – $250,000 – 32S/16D; Singles – Doubles	(Slovenia) Andreja Klepač (Spain) María Teresa Torró Flor; 6–1, 6–1	(United Kingdom) Jocelyn Rae (United Kingdom) Anna Smith	(Slovakia) Jana Čepelová (Spain) Sílvia Soler Espinosa	(Kazakhstan) Yulia Putintseva (Spain) Lara Arruabarrena (Estonia) Kaia Kanepi (Russia) Alexandra Panova
14 Jul	İstanbul Cup; Istanbul, Turkey; WTA International; Hard – $250,000 – 32S/16D; Singles – Doubles	(Denmark) Caroline Wozniacki; 6–1, 6–1	(Italy) Roberta Vinci	(France) Kristina Mladenovic (Croatia) Ana Konjuh	(Czech Republic) Karolína Plíšková (Italy) Francesca Schiavone (Ukraine) Elina Svitolina (Japan) Kurumi Nara
14 Jul	İstanbul Cup; Istanbul, Turkey; WTA International; Hard – $250,000 – 32S/16D; Singles – Doubles	(Japan) Misaki Doi (Ukraine) Elina Svitolina; 6–4, 6–0	(Georgia (country)) Oksana Kalashnikova (Poland) Paula Kania	(France) Kristina Mladenovic (Croatia) Ana Konjuh	(Czech Republic) Karolína Plíšková (Italy) Francesca Schiavone (Ukraine) Elina Svitolina (Japan) Kurumi Nara
21 Jul	Baku Cup; Baku, Azerbaijan; WTA International; Hard – $250,000 – 32S/16D; Singles – Doubles	(Ukraine) Elina Svitolina; 6–1, 7–6^{(7–2)}	(Serbia) Bojana Jovanovski	(Switzerland) Stefanie Vögele (Italy) Francesca Schiavone	(Israel) Shahar Pe'er (Japan) Misa Eguchi (France) Kristina Mladenovic (France) Pauline Parmentier
21 Jul	Baku Cup; Baku, Azerbaijan; WTA International; Hard – $250,000 – 32S/16D; Singles – Doubles	(Russia) Alexandra Panova (United Kingdom) Heather Watson; 6–2, 7–6^{(7–3)}	(Romania) Raluca Olaru (Israel) Shahar Pe'er	(Switzerland) Stefanie Vögele (Italy) Francesca Schiavone	(Israel) Shahar Pe'er (Japan) Misa Eguchi (France) Kristina Mladenovic (France) Pauline Parmentier
28 Jul	Bank of the West Classic; Stanford, United States; WTA Premier; Hard – $710,000 – 28S/16D; Singles – Doubles	(United States) Serena Williams; 7–6^{(7–1)}, 6–3	(Germany) Angelique Kerber	(Germany) Andrea Petkovic (United States) Varvara Lepchenko	(Serbia) Ana Ivanovic (United States) Venus Williams (Spain) Garbiñe Muguruza (United States) Sachia Vickery
28 Jul	Bank of the West Classic; Stanford, United States; WTA Premier; Hard – $710,000 – 28S/16D; Singles – Doubles	(Spain) Garbiñe Muguruza (Spain) Carla Suárez Navarro; 6–2, 4–6, [10–5]	(Poland) Paula Kania (Czech Republic) Kateřina Siniaková	(Germany) Andrea Petkovic (United States) Varvara Lepchenko	(Serbia) Ana Ivanovic (United States) Venus Williams (Spain) Garbiñe Muguruza (United States) Sachia Vickery
28 Jul	Citi Open; Washington, D.C., United States; WTA International; Hard – $250,000 – 32S/16D; Singles – Doubles	(Russia) Svetlana Kuznetsova; 6–3, 4–6, 6–4	(Japan) Kurumi Nara	(New Zealand) Marina Erakovic (Russia) Ekaterina Makarova	(France) Kristina Mladenovic (Serbia) Bojana Jovanovski (United States) Vania King (Russia) Anastasia Pavlyuchenkova
28 Jul	Citi Open; Washington, D.C., United States; WTA International; Hard – $250,000 – 32S/16D; Singles – Doubles	(Japan) Shuko Aoyama (Canada) Gabriela Dabrowski; 6–1, 6–2	(Japan) Hiroko Kuwata (Japan) Kurumi Nara	(New Zealand) Marina Erakovic (Russia) Ekaterina Makarova	(France) Kristina Mladenovic (Serbia) Bojana Jovanovski (United States) Vania King (Russia) Anastasia Pavlyuchenkova

=== August ===
Week	Tournament	Champions	Runners-up	Semifinalists	Quarterfinalists
4 Aug	Rogers Cup; Montreal, Canada; WTA Premier 5 Hard – $2,369,000 – 56S/28D; Singles – Doubles	(Poland) Agnieszka Radwańska; 6–4, 6–2	(United States) Venus Williams	(United States) Serena Williams (Russia) Ekaterina Makarova	(Denmark) Caroline Wozniacki (Spain) Carla Suárez Navarro (Belarus) Victoria Azarenka (United States) CoCo Vandeweghe
4 Aug	Rogers Cup; Montreal, Canada; WTA Premier 5 Hard – $2,369,000 – 56S/28D; Singles – Doubles	(Italy) Sara Errani (Italy) Roberta Vinci; 7–6^{(7–4)}, 6–3	(Zimbabwe) Cara Black (India) Sania Mirza	(United States) Serena Williams (Russia) Ekaterina Makarova	(Denmark) Caroline Wozniacki (Spain) Carla Suárez Navarro (Belarus) Victoria Azarenka (United States) CoCo Vandeweghe
11 Aug	Western & Southern Open; Mason, United States; WTA Premier 5 Hard – $2,369,000 – 56S/28D; Singles – Doubles	(United States) Serena Williams; 6–4, 6–1	(Serbia) Ana Ivanovic	(Denmark) Caroline Wozniacki (Russia) Maria Sharapova	(Serbia) Jelena Janković (Poland) Agnieszka Radwańska (Ukraine) Elina Svitolina (Romania) Simona Halep
11 Aug	Western & Southern Open; Mason, United States; WTA Premier 5 Hard – $2,369,000 – 56S/28D; Singles – Doubles	(United States) Raquel Kops-Jones (United States) Abigail Spears; 6–1, 2–0 retired	(Hungary) Tímea Babos (France) Kristina Mladenovic	(Denmark) Caroline Wozniacki (Russia) Maria Sharapova	(Serbia) Jelena Janković (Poland) Agnieszka Radwańska (Ukraine) Elina Svitolina (Romania) Simona Halep
18 Aug	Connecticut Open; New Haven, United States; WTA Premier; Hard – $710,000 – 30S/16D; Singles – Doubles	(Czech Republic) Petra Kvitová; 6–4, 6–2	(Slovakia) Magdaléna Rybáriková	(Italy) Camila Giorgi (Australia) Samantha Stosur	(United States) Alison Riske (Spain) Garbiñe Muguruza (Belgium) Kirsten Flipkens (Czech Republic) Barbora Záhlavová-Strýcová
18 Aug	Connecticut Open; New Haven, United States; WTA Premier; Hard – $710,000 – 30S/16D; Singles – Doubles	(Slovenia) Andreja Klepač (Spain) Sílvia Soler Espinosa; 7–5, 4–6, [10–7]	(New Zealand) Marina Erakovic (Spain) Arantxa Parra Santonja	(Italy) Camila Giorgi (Australia) Samantha Stosur	(United States) Alison Riske (Spain) Garbiñe Muguruza (Belgium) Kirsten Flipkens (Czech Republic) Barbora Záhlavová-Strýcová
25 Aug; 1 Sep	US Open; New York City, United States; Grand Slam; Hard – $11,517,008; 128S/64D/32X; Singles – Doubles – Mixed doubles	(United States) Serena Williams; 6–3, 6–3	(Denmark) Caroline Wozniacki	(Russia) Ekaterina Makarova (China) Peng Shuai	(Italy) Flavia Pennetta (Belarus) Victoria Azarenka (Switzerland) Belinda Bencic (Italy) Sara Errani
25 Aug; 1 Sep	US Open; New York City, United States; Grand Slam; Hard – $11,517,008; 128S/64D/32X; Singles – Doubles – Mixed doubles	(Russia) Ekaterina Makarova (Russia) Elena Vesnina; 2–6, 6–3, 6–2	(Switzerland) Martina Hingis (Italy) Flavia Pennetta	(Russia) Ekaterina Makarova (China) Peng Shuai	(Italy) Flavia Pennetta (Belarus) Victoria Azarenka (Switzerland) Belinda Bencic (Italy) Sara Errani
25 Aug; 1 Sep	US Open; New York City, United States; Grand Slam; Hard – $11,517,008; 128S/64D/32X; Singles – Doubles – Mixed doubles	(India) Sania Mirza (Brazil) Bruno Soares; 6–1, 2–6, [11–9]	(United States) Abigail Spears (Mexico) Santiago González	(Russia) Ekaterina Makarova (China) Peng Shuai	(Italy) Flavia Pennetta (Belarus) Victoria Azarenka (Switzerland) Belinda Bencic (Italy) Sara Errani

=== September ===
Week	Tournament	Champions	Runners-up	Semifinalists	Quarterfinalists
8 Sep	Coupe Banque Nationale; Quebec City, Canada; WTA International; Carpet (i) – $250,000 – 32S/16D; Singles – Doubles	(Croatia) Mirjana Lučić-Baroni; 6–4, 6–3	(United States) Venus Williams	(United States) Shelby Rogers (Germany) Julia Görges	(Czech Republic) Lucie Hradecká (Germany) Tatjana Maria (Kazakhstan) Sesil Karatantcheva (Czech Republic) Andrea Hlaváčková
8 Sep	Coupe Banque Nationale; Quebec City, Canada; WTA International; Carpet (i) – $250,000 – 32S/16D; Singles – Doubles	(Czech Republic) Lucie Hradecká (Croatia) Mirjana Lučić-Baroni; 6–3, 7–6^{(10–8)}	(Germany) Julia Görges (Czech Republic) Andrea Hlaváčková	(United States) Shelby Rogers (Germany) Julia Görges	(Czech Republic) Lucie Hradecká (Germany) Tatjana Maria (Kazakhstan) Sesil Karatantcheva (Czech Republic) Andrea Hlaváčková
8 Sep	Prudential Hong Kong Open; Hong Kong; WTA International; Hard – $250,000 – 32S/16D; Singles – Doubles	(Germany) Sabine Lisicki; 7–5, 6–3	(Czech Republic) Karolína Plíšková	(Italy) Francesca Schiavone (Belgium) Alison Van Uytvanck	(China) Zheng Saisai (Slovakia) Jana Čepelová (China) Zheng Jie (Australia) Jarmila Gajdošová
8 Sep	Prudential Hong Kong Open; Hong Kong; WTA International; Hard – $250,000 – 32S/16D; Singles – Doubles	(Czech Republic) Karolína Plíšková (Czech Republic) Kristýna Plíšková; 6–2, 2–6, [12–10]	(Austria) Patricia Mayr-Achleitner (Australia) Arina Rodionova	(Italy) Francesca Schiavone (Belgium) Alison Van Uytvanck	(China) Zheng Saisai (Slovakia) Jana Čepelová (China) Zheng Jie (Australia) Jarmila Gajdošová
8 Sep	Tashkent Open; Tashkent, Uzbekistan; WTA International; Hard – $250,000 – 32S/16D; Singles – Doubles	(Italy) Karin Knapp; 6–2, 7–6^{(7–4)}	(Serbia) Bojana Jovanovski	(Uzbekistan) Nigina Abduraimova (Ukraine) Lesia Tsurenko	(Poland) Urszula Radwańska (Uzbekistan) Akgul Amanmuradova (Belarus) Olga Govortsova (Russia) Ksenia Pervak
8 Sep	Tashkent Open; Tashkent, Uzbekistan; WTA International; Hard – $250,000 – 32S/16D; Singles – Doubles	(Serbia) Aleksandra Krunić (Czech Republic) Kateřina Siniaková; 6–2, 6–1	(Russia) Margarita Gasparyan (Russia) Alexandra Panova	(Uzbekistan) Nigina Abduraimova (Ukraine) Lesia Tsurenko	(Poland) Urszula Radwańska (Uzbekistan) Akgul Amanmuradova (Belarus) Olga Govortsova (Russia) Ksenia Pervak
15 Sep	Toray Pan Pacific Open; Tokyo, Japan; WTA Premier; Hard – $1,000,000 – 28S/16D; Singles – Doubles	(Serbia) Ana Ivanovic; 6–2, 7–6^{(7–2)}	(Denmark) Caroline Wozniacki	(Germany) Angelique Kerber (Spain) Garbiñe Muguruza	(Slovakia) Dominika Cibulková (Czech Republic) Lucie Šafářová (Australia) Casey Dellacqua (Spain) Carla Suárez Navarro
15 Sep	Toray Pan Pacific Open; Tokyo, Japan; WTA Premier; Hard – $1,000,000 – 28S/16D; Singles – Doubles	(Zimbabwe) Cara Black (India) Sania Mirza; 6–2, 7–5	(Spain) Garbiñe Muguruza (Spain) Carla Suárez Navarro	(Germany) Angelique Kerber (Spain) Garbiñe Muguruza	(Slovakia) Dominika Cibulková (Czech Republic) Lucie Šafářová (Australia) Casey Dellacqua (Spain) Carla Suárez Navarro
15 Sep	Kia Korea Open; Seoul, South Korea; WTA International; Hard – $500,000 – 32S/16D; Singles – Doubles	(Czech Republic) Karolína Plíšková; 6–3, 6–7^{(5–7)}, 6–2	(United States) Varvara Lepchenko	(United States) Christina McHale (Russia) Maria Kirilenko	(Poland) Agnieszka Radwańska (Slovakia) Magdaléna Rybáriková (Estonia) Kaia Kanepi (United States) Nicole Gibbs
15 Sep	Kia Korea Open; Seoul, South Korea; WTA International; Hard – $500,000 – 32S/16D; Singles – Doubles	(Spain) Lara Arruabarrena (Romania) Irina-Camelia Begu; 6–3, 6–3	(Germany) Mona Barthel (Luxembourg) Mandy Minella	(United States) Christina McHale (Russia) Maria Kirilenko	(Poland) Agnieszka Radwańska (Slovakia) Magdaléna Rybáriková (Estonia) Kaia Kanepi (United States) Nicole Gibbs
15 Sep	Guangzhou International Women's Open; Guangzhou, China; WTA International; Hard – $500,000 – 32S/16D; Singles – Doubles	(Romania) Monica Niculescu; 6–4, 6–0	(France) Alizé Cornet	(China) Wang Yafan (Switzerland) Timea Bacsinszky	(China) Zhang Kailin (Puerto Rico) Monica Puig (Spain) María Teresa Torró Flor (Chinese Taipei) Hsieh Su-wei
15 Sep	Guangzhou International Women's Open; Guangzhou, China; WTA International; Hard – $500,000 – 32S/16D; Singles – Doubles	(Chinese Taipei) Chuang Chia-jung (China) Liang Chen; 2–6, 7–6^{(7–3)}, [10–7]	(France) Alizé Cornet (Poland) Magda Linette	(China) Wang Yafan (Switzerland) Timea Bacsinszky	(China) Zhang Kailin (Puerto Rico) Monica Puig (Spain) María Teresa Torró Flor (Chinese Taipei) Hsieh Su-wei
22 Sep	Wuhan Open; Wuhan, China; WTA Premier 5 Hard – $2,440,070 – 56S/28D; Singles – Doubles	(Czech Republic) Petra Kvitová; 6–3, 6–4	(Canada) Eugenie Bouchard	(Denmark) Caroline Wozniacki (Ukraine) Elina Svitolina	(France) Alizé Cornet (Switzerland) Timea Bacsinszky (France) Caroline Garcia (Germany) Angelique Kerber
22 Sep	Wuhan Open; Wuhan, China; WTA Premier 5 Hard – $2,440,070 – 56S/28D; Singles – Doubles	(Switzerland) Martina Hingis (Italy) Flavia Pennetta; 6–4, 5–7, [12–10]	(Zimbabwe) Cara Black (France) Caroline Garcia	(Denmark) Caroline Wozniacki (Ukraine) Elina Svitolina	(France) Alizé Cornet (Switzerland) Timea Bacsinszky (France) Caroline Garcia (Germany) Angelique Kerber
29 Sep	China Open; Beijing, China; WTA Premier Mandatory; Hard – $5,427,105 – 60S/28D; Singles – Doubles	(Russia) Maria Sharapova; 6–4, 2–6, 6–3	(Czech Republic) Petra Kvitová	(Australia) Samantha Stosur (Serbia) Ana Ivanovic	(United States) Serena Williams (Italy) Roberta Vinci (Russia) Svetlana Kuznetsova (Romania) Simona Halep
29 Sep	China Open; Beijing, China; WTA Premier Mandatory; Hard – $5,427,105 – 60S/28D; Singles – Doubles	(Czech Republic) Andrea Hlaváčková (China) Peng Shuai; 6–4, 6–4	(Zimbabwe) Cara Black (India) Sania Mirza	(Australia) Samantha Stosur (Serbia) Ana Ivanovic	(United States) Serena Williams (Italy) Roberta Vinci (Russia) Svetlana Kuznetsova (Romania) Simona Halep

=== October ===
Week	Tournament	Champions	Runners-up	Semifinalists	Quarterfinalists
6 Oct	Tianjin Open; Tianjin, China; WTA International; Hard – $250,000 – 32S/16D; Singles – Doubles	(United States) Alison Riske; 6–3, 6–4	(Switzerland) Belinda Bencic	(China) Zheng Saisai (China) Peng Shuai	(Romania) Sorana Cîrstea (United States) Varvara Lepchenko (Chinese Taipei) Hsieh Su-wei (Croatia) Ajla Tomljanović
6 Oct	Tianjin Open; Tianjin, China; WTA International; Hard – $250,000 – 32S/16D; Singles – Doubles	(Russia) Alla Kudryavtseva (Australia) Anastasia Rodionova; 6–7^{(6–8)}, 6–2, [10–8]	(Romania) Sorana Cîrstea (Slovenia) Andreja Klepač	(China) Zheng Saisai (China) Peng Shuai	(Romania) Sorana Cîrstea (United States) Varvara Lepchenko (Chinese Taipei) Hsieh Su-wei (Croatia) Ajla Tomljanović
6 Oct	HP Japan Women's Open Tennis; Osaka, Japan; WTA International; Hard – $250,000 – 32S/16D; Singles – Doubles	(Australia) Samantha Stosur; 7–6^{(9–7)}, 6–3	(Kazakhstan) Zarina Diyas	(Ukraine) Elina Svitolina (Thailand) Luksika Kumkhum	(Kazakhstan) Yulia Putintseva (United States) Lauren Davis (Croatia) Ana Konjuh (United States) Madison Keys
6 Oct	HP Japan Women's Open Tennis; Osaka, Japan; WTA International; Hard – $250,000 – 32S/16D; Singles – Doubles	(Japan) Shuko Aoyama (Czech Republic) Renata Voráčová; 6–1, 6–2	(Spain) Lara Arruabarrena (Germany) Tatjana Maria	(Ukraine) Elina Svitolina (Thailand) Luksika Kumkhum	(Kazakhstan) Yulia Putintseva (United States) Lauren Davis (Croatia) Ana Konjuh (United States) Madison Keys
6 Oct	Generali Ladies Linz; Linz, Austria; WTA International; Hard (i) – $250,000 – 32S/16D; Singles – Doubles	(Czech Republic) Karolína Plíšková; 6–7^{(4–7)}, 6–3, 7–6^{(7–4)}	(Italy) Camila Giorgi	(Italy) Karin Knapp (Germany) Anna-Lena Friedsam	(Bulgaria) Tsvetana Pironkova (New Zealand) Marina Erakovic (Switzerland) Stefanie Vögele (United States) Madison Brengle
6 Oct	Generali Ladies Linz; Linz, Austria; WTA International; Hard (i) – $250,000 – 32S/16D; Singles – Doubles	(Romania) Raluca Olaru (United States) Anna Tatishvili; 6–2, 6–1	(Germany) Annika Beck (France) Caroline Garcia	(Italy) Karin Knapp (Germany) Anna-Lena Friedsam	(Bulgaria) Tsvetana Pironkova (New Zealand) Marina Erakovic (Switzerland) Stefanie Vögele (United States) Madison Brengle
13 Oct	Kremlin Cup; Moscow, Russia; WTA Premier; Hard (i) – $710,000 – 28S/16D; Singles – Doubles	(Russia) Anastasia Pavlyuchenkova; 6–4, 5–7, 6–1	(Romania) Irina-Camelia Begu	(Czech Republic) Kateřina Siniaková (Czech Republic) Lucie Šafářová	(Russia) Vitalia Diatchenko (Italy) Camila Giorgi (Russia) Svetlana Kuznetsova (Bulgaria) Tsvetana Pironkova
13 Oct	Kremlin Cup; Moscow, Russia; WTA Premier; Hard (i) – $710,000 – 28S/16D; Singles – Doubles	(Switzerland) Martina Hingis (Italy) Flavia Pennetta; 6–3, 7–5	(France) Caroline Garcia (Spain) Arantxa Parra Santonja	(Czech Republic) Kateřina Siniaková (Czech Republic) Lucie Šafářová	(Russia) Vitalia Diatchenko (Italy) Camila Giorgi (Russia) Svetlana Kuznetsova (Bulgaria) Tsvetana Pironkova
13 Oct	BGL Luxembourg Open; Kockelscheuer, Luxembourg; WTA International; Hard (i) – $250,000 – 32S/16D; Singles – Doubles	(Germany) Annika Beck; 6–2, 6–1	(Czech Republic) Barbora Záhlavová-Strýcová	(Czech Republic) Denisa Allertová (Germany) Mona Barthel	(Austria) Patricia Mayr-Achleitner (United States) Varvara Lepchenko (Sweden) Johanna Larsson (Netherlands) Kiki Bertens
13 Oct	BGL Luxembourg Open; Kockelscheuer, Luxembourg; WTA International; Hard (i) – $250,000 – 32S/16D; Singles – Doubles	(Switzerland) Timea Bacsinszky (Germany) Kristina Barrois; 3–6, 6–4, [10–4]	(Czech Republic) Lucie Hradecká (Czech Republic) Barbora Krejčíková	(Czech Republic) Denisa Allertová (Germany) Mona Barthel	(Austria) Patricia Mayr-Achleitner (United States) Varvara Lepchenko (Sweden) Johanna Larsson (Netherlands) Kiki Bertens
20 Oct	BNP Paribas WTA Finals; Singapore; Year-end championships Hard (i) – $6,500,000 – 8S (RR)/8D; Singles – Doubles	(United States) Serena Williams; 6–3, 6–0	(Romania) Simona Halep	(Poland) Agnieszka Radwańska (Denmark) Caroline Wozniacki	Round robin losers (Canada) Eugenie Bouchard (Serbia) Ana Ivanovic (Russia) Maria Sharapova (Czech Republic) Petra Kvitová
20 Oct	BNP Paribas WTA Finals; Singapore; Year-end championships Hard (i) – $6,500,000 – 8S (RR)/8D; Singles – Doubles	(Zimbabwe) Cara Black (India) Sania Mirza; 6–1, 6–0	(Chinese Taipei) Hsieh Su-wei (China) Peng Shuai	(Poland) Agnieszka Radwańska (Denmark) Caroline Wozniacki	Round robin losers (Canada) Eugenie Bouchard (Serbia) Ana Ivanovic (Russia) Maria Sharapova (Czech Republic) Petra Kvitová
27 Oct	WTA Tournament of Champions; Sofia, Bulgaria; Year-end championships Hard (i) – $750,000 – 8S; Singles	(Germany) Andrea Petkovic; 1–6, 6–4, 6–3	(Italy) Flavia Pennetta	(Spain) Garbiñe Muguruza (Spain) Carla Suárez Navarro	Round robin losers (Czech Republic) Karolína Plíšková (Slovakia) Dominika Cibulková (France) Alizé Cornet (Bulgaria) Tsvetana Pironkova (Russia) Ekaterina Makarova (withdrew)

=== November ===
Week	Tournament	Champions	Runners-up	Semifinalists	Quarterfinalists
3 Nov	Fed Cup Final; Prague, Czech Republic – hard (i)	Czech Republic; 3–1	Germany		

== Statistical information ==
These tables present the number of singles (S), doubles (D), and mixed doubles (X) titles won by each player and each nation during the season, within all the tournament categories of the 2014 WTA Tour: the Grand Slam tournaments, the year-end championships (the WTA Tour Championships and the Tournament of Champions), the WTA Premier tournaments (Premier Mandatory, Premier 5, and regular Premier), and the WTA International tournaments. The players/nations are sorted by: 1) total number of titles (a doubles title won by two players representing the same nation counts as only one win for the nation); 2) cumulated importance of those titles (one Grand Slam win equalling two Premier Mandatory/Premier 5 wins, one year-end championships win equalling one-and-a-half Premier Mandatory/Premier 5 win, one Premier Mandatory/Premier 5 win equalling two Premier wins, one Premier win equalling two International wins); 3) a singles > doubles > mixed doubles hierarchy; 4) alphabetical order (by family names for players).

=== Key ===
Grand Slam tournaments
Year-end championships
WTA Premier Mandatory
WTA Premier 5
WTA Premier
WTA International

=== Titles won by player ===
Total	Player	Grand Slam			Year-end		Premier Mandatory		Premier 5		Premier		International		Total		
Total	Player	S	D	X	S	D	S	D	S	D	S	D	S	D	S	D	X
7	Serena Williams (USA)	●			●		●		● ●		● ●				7	0	0
5	Sara Errani (ITA)		● ●					●		●		●			0	5	0
5	Roberta Vinci (ITA)		● ●					●		●		●			0	5	0
5	Peng Shuai (CHN)		●					● ●		●				●	0	5	0
5	Karolína Plíšková (CZE)												● ●	● ● ●	2	3	0
4	Maria Sharapova (RUS)	●					● ●				●				4	0	0
4	Sania Mirza (IND)			●		●						●		●	0	3	1
4	Ana Ivanovic (SRB)										● ●		● ●		4	0	0
3	Petra Kvitová (CZE)	●							●		●				3	0	0
3	Hsieh Su-wei (TPE)		●					●		●					0	3	0
3	Andrea Petkovic (GER)				●						●		●		3	0	0
3	Cara Black (ZIM)					●						●		●	0	3	0
3	Flavia Pennetta (ITA)						●			●		●			1	2	0
3	Martina Hingis (SUI)							●		●		●			0	3	0
3	Alla Kudryavtseva (RUS)											● ●		●	0	3	0
3	Anastasia Rodionova (AUS)											● ●		●	0	3	0
3	Garbiñe Muguruza (ESP)											●	●	●	1	2	0
3	Klára Koukalová (CZE)												●	● ●	1	2	0
3	Monica Niculescu (ROU)												●	● ●	1	2	0
2	Li Na (CHN)	●											●		2	0	0
2	Ekaterina Makarova (RUS)		●										●		1	1	0
2	Anna-Lena Grönefeld (GER)			●								●			0	1	1
2	Samantha Stosur (AUS)			●									●		1	0	1
2	Kristina Mladenovic (FRA)			●										●	0	1	1
2	Sabine Lisicki (GER)							●					●		1	1	0
2	Simona Halep (ROU)								●				●		2	0	0
2	Raquel Kops-Jones (USA)									●		●			0	2	0
2	Květa Peschke (CZE)									●		●			0	2	0
2	Abigail Spears (USA)									●		●			0	2	0
2	Anastasia Pavlyuchenkova (RUS)										● ●				2	0	0
2	Carla Suárez Navarro (ESP)											●	●		1	1	0
2	Tímea Babos (HUN)											●		●	0	2	0
2	Chan Hao-ching (TPE)											●		●	0	2	0
2	Andreja Klepač (SLO)											●		●	0	2	0
2	Anabel Medina Garrigues (ESP)											●		●	0	2	0
2	Yaroslava Shvedova (KAZ)											●		●	0	2	0
2	Caroline Garcia (FRA)												●	●	1	1	0
2	Mirjana Lučić-Baroni (CRO)												●	●	1	1	0
2	María Teresa Torró Flor (ESP)												●	●	1	1	0
2	Elina Svitolina (UKR)												●	●	1	1	0
2	Shuko Aoyama (JPN)													● ●	0	2	0
2	Lara Arruabarrena (ESP)													● ●	0	2	0
2	Irina-Camelia Begu (ROU)													● ●	0	2	0
2	Kristýna Plíšková (CZE)													● ●	0	2	0
1	Elena Vesnina (RUS)		●												0	1	0
1	Andrea Hlaváčková (CZE)							●							0	1	0
1	Agnieszka Radwańska (POL)								●						1	0	0
1	Katarina Srebotnik (SLO)									●					0	1	0
1	Madison Keys (USA)										●				1	0	0
1	Tsvetana Pironkova (BUL)										●				1	0	0
1	Venus Williams (USA)										●				1	0	0
1	Chan Yung-jan (TPE)											●			0	1	0
1	Lucie Šafářová (CZE)											●			0	1	0
1	Sílvia Soler Espinosa (ESP)											●			0	1	0
1	Annika Beck (GER)												●		1	0	0
1	Eugenie Bouchard (CAN)												●		1	0	0
1	Mona Barthel (GER)												●		1	0	0
1	Dominika Cibulková (SVK)												●		1	0	0
1	Alizé Cornet (FRA)												●		1	0	0
1	Karin Knapp (ITA)												●		1	0	0
1	Svetlana Kuznetsova (RUS)												●		1	0	0
1	Kurumi Nara (JPN)												●		1	0	0
1	Monica Puig (PUR)												●		1	0	0
1	Alison Riske (USA)												●		1	0	0
1	Coco Vandeweghe (USA)												●		1	0	0
1	Donna Vekić (CRO)												●		1	0	0
1	Caroline Wozniacki (DEN)												●		1	0	0
1	Timea Bacsinszky (SUI)													●	0	1	0
1	Kristina Barrois (GER)													●	0	1	0
1	Ashleigh Barty (AUS)													●	0	1	0
1	Yuliya Beygelzimer (UKR)													●	0	1	0
1	Elena Bogdan (ROU)													●	0	1	0
1	Alexandra Cadanțu (ROU)													●	0	1	0
1	Chan Hao-ching (TPE)													●	0	1	0
1	Chuang Chia-jung (TPE)													●	0	1	0
1	Gabriela Dabrowski (CAN)													●	0	1	0
1	Casey Dellacqua (AUS)													●	0	1	0
1	Misaki Doi (JPN)													●	0	1	0
1	Marina Erakovic (NZL)													●	0	1	0
1	Sharon Fichman (CAN)													●	0	1	0
1	Lucie Hradecká (CZE)													●	0	1	0
1	María Irigoyen (ARG)													●	0	1	0
1	Darija Jurak (CRO)													●	0	1	0
1	Michaëlla Krajicek (NED)													●	0	1	0
1	Aleksandra Krunić (SRB)													●	0	1	0
1	Megan Moulton-Levy (USA)													●	0	1	0
1	Liang Chen (CHN)													●	0	1	0
1	Raluca Olaru (ROU)													●	0	1	0
1	Romina Oprandi (SUI)													●	0	1	0
1	Arantxa Parra Santonja (ESP)													●	0	1	0
1	Olga Savchuk (UKR)													●	0	1	0
1	Maria Sanchez (USA)													●	0	1	0
1	Alexandra Panova (RUS)													●	0	1	0
1	Kateřina Siniaková (CZE)													●	0	1	0
1	Anna Tatishvili (USA)													●	0	1	0
1	Renata Voráčová (CZE)													●	0	1	0
1	Galina Voskoboeva (KAZ)													●	0	1	0
1	Heather Watson (GBR)													●	0	1	0
1	Zhang Shuai (CHN)													●	0	1	0

=== Titles won by nation ===
Total	Nation	Grand Slam			Year-end		Premier Mandatory		Premier 5		Premier		International		Total		
Total	Nation	S	D	X	S	D	S	D	S	D	S	D	S	D	S	D	X
18	Czech Republic (CZE)	1						1	1	1	1	2	3	8	6	12	0
16	United States (USA)	1			1		1		2	1	4	1	2	3	11	5	0
13	Russia (RUS)	1	1				2				3	2	2	2	8	5	0
12	Spain (ESP)											3	3	6	3	9	0
10	Germany (GER)			1	1			1			1	1	4	1	6	3	1
9	Italy (ITA)		2				1	1		2		2	1		2	7	0
9	Romania (ROU)								1				2	6	3	6	0
8	China (CHN)	1	1					2		1			1	2	2	6	0
6	Chinese Taipei (TPE)		1					1		1		1		2	0	6	0
6	France (FRA)			1									2	3	2	3	1
5	Australia (AUS)			1								2		2	0	4	1
5	Switzerland (SUI)							1		1		1		2	0	5	0
5	Serbia (SRB)										2		2	1	4	1	0
4	India (IND)			1		1						1		1	0	3	1
4	Croatia (CRO)												2	2	2	2	0
4	Japan (JPN)												1	3	1	3	0
3	Zimbabwe (ZIM)					1						1		1	0	3	0
3	Slovenia (SLO)									1		1		1	0	3	0
3	Kazakhstan (KAZ)											1		2	0	3	0
3	Canada (CAN)												1	2	1	2	0
3	Ukraine (UKR)												1	2	1	2	0
2	Hungary (HUN)											1		1	0	2	0
1	Poland (POL)								1						1	0	0
1	Bulgaria (BUL)										1				1	0	0
1	Denmark (DEN)												1		1	0	0
1	Puerto Rico (PUR)												1		1	0	0
1	Slovakia (SVK)												1		1	0	0
1	Argentina (ARG)													1	0	1	0
1	Great Britain (GBR)													1	0	1	0
1	Netherlands (NED)													1	0	1	0
1	New Zealand (NZL)													1	0	1	0

=== Titles information ===
The following players won their first main circuit title in singles, doubles, or mixed doubles:

Singles
- (Bulgaria) Tsvetana Pironkova – Sydney (draw)
- (Spain) Garbiñe Muguruza – Hobart (draw)
- (Japan) Kurumi Nara – Rio de Janeiro (draw)
- (France) Caroline Garcia – Bogotá (draw)
- (Croatia) Donna Vekić – Kuala Lumpur (draw)
- (Spain) María Teresa Torró Flor – Marrakesh (draw)
- (Spain) Carla Suárez Navarro – Oeiras (draw)
- (Canada) Eugenie Bouchard – Nuremberg (draw)
- (Puerto Rico) Monica Puig – Strasbourg (draw)
- (United States) CoCo Vandeweghe - s'Hertogenbosch (draw)
- (United States) Madison Keys - Eastbourne (draw)
- (Italy) Karin Knapp – Tashkent (draw)
- (United States) Alison Riske – Tianjin (draw)
- (Germany) Annika Beck – Luxembourg City (draw)

Doubles
- (Canada) Sharon Fichman – Auckland (draw)
- (United States) Maria Sanchez – Auckland (draw)
- (Argentina) María Irigoyen – Rio de Janeiro (draw)
- (Croatia) Darija Jurak – Monterrey (draw)
- (United States) Megan Moulton-Levy – Monterrey (draw)
- (France) Caroline Garcia – Bogotá (draw)
- (Switzerland) Romina Oprandi – Marrakesh (draw)
- (Romania) Elena Bogdan – Bucharest (draw)
- (Romania) Alexandra Cadanțu – Bucharest (draw)
- (Ukraine) Elina Svitolina – Istanbul (draw)
- (Japan) Misaki Doi – Istanbul (draw)
- (Canada) Gabriela Dabrowski – Washington (draw)
- (Spain) Carla Suárez Navarro – Stanford (draw)
- (Spain) Sílvia Soler Espinosa – New Haven (draw)
- (Serbia) Aleksandra Krunić – Tashkent (draw)
- (Czech Republic) Kateřina Siniaková – Tashkent (draw)
- (China) Liang Chen – Guangzhou (draw)
- (United States) Anna Tatishvili – Linz (draw)
- (Germany) Kristina Barrois – Luxembourg City (draw)

The following players defended a main circuit title in singles, doubles, or mixed doubles:

Singles
- (China) Li Na – Shenzhen (draw)
- (United States) Serena Williams – Brisbane (draw), Miami (draw), Rome (draw), US Open (draw), WTA Finals (draw)
- (Russia) Maria Sharapova – Stuttgart (draw)
- (Ukraine) Elina Svitolina – Baku (draw)
- (Australia) Samantha Stosur – Osaka (draw)

Doubles
- (Italy) Sara Errani – Australian Open (draw)
- (Italy) Roberta Vinci – Australian Open (draw)
- (Spain) Anabel Medina Garrigues – Florianópolis (draw)
- (Kazakhstan) Yaroslava Shvedova – Florianópolis (draw)
- (Japan) Shuko Aoyama – Washington (draw)
- (Zimbabwe) Cara Black – Tokyo (draw)
- (India) Sania Mirza – Tokyo (draw)

=== Top 10 entry ===
The following players entered the top 10 for the first time in their careers:

Singles
- (Romania) Simona Halep (enters at #10 on January 27)
- (Slovakia) Dominika Cibulková (enters at #10 on March 31)
- (Canada) Eugenie Bouchard (enters at #7 on July 7)

== WTA rankings ==
These are the WTA rankings of the top 20 singles players at the current date of the 2014 season. Players with a gold background qualified for the WTA Tour Championships.

=== Singles ===
WTA Championships Race Rankings as of 20 October 2014
#	Player	Points	Tours
1	Serena Williams (USA)	7,146	18
2	Maria Sharapova (RUS)	6,680	16
3	Petra Kvitová (CZE)	5,597	19
4	Simona Halep (ROU)	5,403	20
5	Eugenie Bouchard (CAN)	4,523	23
6	Agnieszka Radwańska (POL)	4,441	21
7	Ana Ivanovic (SRB)	4,390	22
8	Caroline Wozniacki (DEN)	4,045	20
9	Angelique Kerber (GER)	3,480	22
10	Dominika Cibulková (SVK)	3,052	24
11	Ekaterina Makarova (RUS)	2,970	21
12	Flavia Pennetta (ITA)	2,861	20
13	Andrea Petkovic (GER)	2,675	22
14	Sara Errani (ITA)	2,642	19
15	Jelena Janković (SRB)	2,615	24
16	Lucie Šafářová (CZE)	2,495	24
17	Venus Williams (USA)	2,370	24
18	Carla Suárez Navarro (ESP)	2,270	18
19	Alizé Cornet (FRA)	2,200	23
20	Garbiñe Muguruza (ESP)	2,005	24

Champion

Player has qualified for the 2014 WTA Tour Championships

WTA Singles Year-End Rankings
#	Player	Points	#Trn	'13 Rk	High	Low	'13→'14
1	Serena Williams (USA)	8,485	18	1	1	1	Steady
2	Maria Sharapova (RUS)	7,050	16	4	2	9	▲2
3	Simona Halep (ROU)	6,292	20	11	2	11	▲8
4	Petra Kvitová (CZE)	5,966	19	6	3	9	▲2
5	Ana Ivanovic (SRB)	4,820	22	16	5	14	▲11
6	Agnieszka Radwańska (POL)	4,810	21	5	3	7	▼1
7	Eugenie Bouchard (CAN)	4,715	23	32	5	32	▲25
8	Caroline Wozniacki (DEN)	4,625	20	10	7	18	▲2
9	Li Na (CHN)	3,970	14	3	2	9	▼6
10	Angelique Kerber (GER)	3,480	22	9	6	10	▼1
11	Dominika Cibulková (SVK)	3,052	24	23	10	24	▲12
12	Ekaterina Makarova (RUS)	2,920	20	24	11	28	▲12
13	Flavia Pennetta (ITA)	2,861	20	31	11	31	▲18
14	Andrea Petkovic (GER)	2,780	25	39	14	40	▲25
15	Sara Errani (ITA)	2,775	23	7	7	15	▼8
16	Jelena Janković (SRB)	2,675	22	8	6	16	▼8
17	Lucie Šafářová (CZE)	2,615	24	29	14	29	▲12
18	Carla Suárez Navarro (ESP)	2,410	25	17	14	19	▼1
19	Venus Williams (USA)	2,270	18	49	18	49	▲30
20	Alizé Cornet (FRA)	2,255	24	27	20	27	▲7

==== Number 1 ranking ====
Holder	Date gained	Date forfeited
Serena Williams (USA)	Year-End 2013	Year-End 2014

=== Doubles ===
WTA rankings (Doubles), as of 2 February 2015
#	Player	Points	2013 rank	Move^{‡}
1	Sara Errani (ITA)	9,585	1	Steady
1	Roberta Vinci (ITA)	9,585	1	Steady
3	Peng Shuai (CHN)	7,800	4	▼1
4	Cara Black (ZIM)	6,775	13	▲9
5	Hsieh Su-wei (TPE)	6,510	3	▼2
6	Sania Mirza (IND)	6,470	9	▲3
7	Elena Vesnina (RUS)	5,580	5	▼12
7	Ekaterina Makarova (RUS)	5,500	7	Steady
9	Květa Peschke (CZE)	5,000	16	▲7
10	Katarina Srebotnik (SLO)	4,630	6	▼4
11	Martina Hingis (SUI)	4,575	180	▲169
12	Raquel Kops-Jones (USA)	4.515	23	▲11
12	Abigail Spears (USA)	4,515	23	▲11
14	Flavia Pennetta (ITA)	4,200	32	▲18
15	Garbiñe Muguruza (ESP)	4,045	153	▲138
16	Andrea Hlaváčková (CZE)	4,030	11	▼5
17	Kristina Mladenovic (FRA)	3,945	19	▲2
18	Alla Kudryavtseva (RUS)	3,915	31	▲13
18	Anastasia Rodionova (AUS)	3,915	26	▲8
20	Carla Suárez Navarro (ESP)	3,870	58	▲38

WTA Championships Race Rankings as of 20 October 2014
#	Player	Points	Tours
1	Roberta Vinci (ITA); Sara Errani (ITA)	9,315	18
2	Hsieh Su-wei (TPE); Peng Shuai (CHN)	5,262	12
3	Cara Black (ZIM); Sania Mirza (IND)	5,185	21
4	Elena Vesnina (RUS); Ekaterina Makarova (RUS)	5,130	13
5	Raquel Kops-Jones (USA); Abigail Spears (USA)	4,240	21
6	Květa Peschke (CZE); Katarina Srebotnik (SLO)	3,950	18
7	Carla Suárez Navarro (ESP); Garbiñe Muguruza (ESP)	3,515	12
8	Alla Kudryavtseva (RUS); Anastasia Rodionova (AUS)	3,410	21
9	Martina Hingis (SUI); Flavia Pennetta (ITA)	3,346	8
10	Anabel Medina Garrigues (ESP); Yaroslava Shvedova (KAZ)	2,625	16

Champion

Team has qualified for the 2014 WTA Tour Championships

==== Number 1 ranking ====
Holder	Date gained	Date forfeited
Sara Errani (ITA); Roberta Vinci (ITA)	Year-end 2013	16 February 2014
Peng Shuai (CHN)	17 February 2014	
Peng Shuai (CHN); Hsieh Su-wei (TPE)	12 May 2014	18 May 2014
Peng Shuai (CHN)	19 May 2014	
Peng Shuai (CHN); Hsieh Su-wei (TPE)	9 June 2014	6 July 2014
Sara Errani (ITA); Roberta Vinci (ITA)	7 July 2014	Year-end 2014

== Prize money leaders ==
Serena Williams lead for the 2nd consecutive year, and 5th overall, with the second highest single-season earnings. Also for the second consecutive season, top-25 players earned over $1,000,000. Sara Errani and Roberta Vinci each made $1,001,168 by playing in doubles tournaments. It was the 1st time in WTA Tour history a player earned over $1,000,000 in doubles events.

#	Player	Singles	Doubles	Mixed	Bonus Pool	Year-to-date
1	Serena Williams (USA)	$8,823,749	$43,549	$0	$450,000	$9,317,298
2	Maria Sharapova (RUS)	$5,439,357	$0	$0	$400,000	$5,839,357
3	Petra Kvitová (CZE)	$4,845,342	$7,894	$0	$350,000	$5,203,236
4	Simona Halep (ROU)	$4,506,687	$13,076	$0	$0	$4,519,763
5	Li Na (CHN)	$3,409,885	$0	$0	$0	$3,409,885
6	Caroline Wozniacki (DEN)	$3,172,350	$0	$0	$200,000	$3,372,350
7	Eugenie Bouchard (CAN)	$3,196,832	$24,097	$0	$0	$3,220,929
8	Agnieszka Radwańska (POL)	$2,745,411	$0	$0	$450,000	$3,195,411
9	Sara Errani (ITA)	$1,363,388	$1,001,168	$0	$225,000	$2,589,556
10	Flavia Pennetta (ITA)	$2,083,590	$314,655	$0	$0	$2,398,245
prize money given in US$; as of November 3, 2014

== Statistics leaders ==
as of November 10, 2014

Aces
#	Player	Aces	Matches
1	(United States) Serena Williams	452	60
2	(Czech Republic) Karolína Plíšková	435	68
3	(United States) CoCo Vandeweghe	306	36
4	(Czech Republic) Lucie Šafářová	272	59
5	(Czech Republic) Petra Kvitová	263	55
6	(Germany) Sabine Lisicki	245	45
7	(United States) Madison Keys	235	48
8	(Australia) Samantha Stosur	234	53
9	(Serbia) Ana Ivanovic	231	75
10	(United States) Venus Williams	222	46

Second-serve points won
#	Player	%	Matches
1	(Australia) Samantha Stosur	50.3	53
2	(United States) Serena Williams	50.3	60
3	(Belgium) Alison Van Uytvanck	50.1	29
4	(Czech Republic) Petra Kvitová	49.9	55
5	(Romania) Simona Halep	49.6	62
6	(Serbia) Ana Ivanovic	49.1	75
7	(Australia) Casey Dellacqua	49.1	43
8	(United States) Madison Keys	49.1	48
9	(China) Li Na	48.7	35
10	(Spain) Sílvia Soler Espinosa	48.5	39

First-serve percentage
#	Player	%	Matches
1	(Italy) Sara Errani	80.7	48
2	(Japan) Kurumi Nara	74.3	37
3	(Germany) Annika Beck	72.7	51
4	(Spain) Carla Suárez Navarro	71.8	29
5	(China) Zheng Jie	70.9	32
6	(Slovakia) Jana Čepelová	70.3	20
7	(Brazil) Teliana Pereira	70.3	17
8	(Denmark) Caroline Wozniacki	70.3	46
9	(Germany) Andrea Petkovic	69.9	44
10	(Austria) Yvonne Meusburger	69.9	33

Service games won
#	Player	%	Matches
1	(United States) Serena Williams	81.7	44
2	(United States) CoCo Vandeweghe	80.5	25
3	(Czech Republic) Lucie Šafářová	76.0	45
4	(Czech Republic) Petra Kvitová	74.6	36
5	(Denmark) Caroline Wozniacki	73.8	46
6	(Romania) Simona Halep	73.6	49
7	(China) Li Na	73.3	35
8	(Czech Republic) Karolína Plíšková	73.2	44
9	(Australia) Samantha Stosur	72.9	36
10	(United States) Venus Williams	72.7	35

First-service points won
#	Player	%	Matches
1	(United States) CoCo Vandeweghe	76.3	25
2	(United States) Serena Williams	75.1	44
3	(United States) Venus Williams	70.6	35
4	(Czech Republic) Karolína Plíšková	70.0	44
5	(Czech Republic) Lucie Šafářová	69.5	45
6	(Italy) Camila Giorgi	68.5	31
7	(Russia) Anastasia Pavlyuchenkova	68.3	35
8	(Czech Republic) Petra Kvitová	68.0	36
9	(United States) Madison Keys	68.0	38
10	(Russia) Maria Sharapova	67.7	47

Break points saved
#	Player	%	Matches
1	(United States) Serena Williams	63.2	50
2	(Czech Republic) Lucie Šafářová	61.5	49
3	(Germany) Angelique Kerber	60.7	56
4	(Czech Republic) Barbora Záhlavová-Strýcová	60.4	41
5	(China) Li Na	60.2	35
6	(Slovakia) Dominika Cibulková	59.6	45
7	(Belarus) Victoria Azarenka	59.5	22
8	(Spain) Garbiñe Muguruza	59.3	48
9	(Denmark) Caroline Wozniacki	59.3	54
10	(Serbia) Jelena Janković	59.2	54

Points won returning first service
#	Player	%	Matches
1	(Italy) Sara Errani	43.8	48
2	(Romania) Monica Niculescu	43.5	30
3	(Romania) Simona Halep	43.0	49
4	(South Africa) Chanelle Scheepers	42.9	28
5	(Poland) Agnieszka Radwańska	42.8	53
6	(Spain) Carla Suárez Navarro	42.3	59
7	(Germany) Annika Beck	42.3	33
8	(Czech Republic) Klára Koukalová	41.6	24
9	(China) Li Na	41.4	35
10	(China) Zheng Jie	41.4	21

Break points converted
#	Player	%	Matches
1	(Romania) Monica Niculescu	55.6	30
2	(China) Zheng Jie	54.3	21
3	(Romania) Simona Halep	52.9	49
4	(Argentina) Paula Ormaechea	52.8	25
5	(China) Li Na	52.8	35
6	(South Africa) Chanelle Scheepers	52.3	28
7	(Russia) Maria Sharapova	52.3	47
8	(United States) Serena Williams	51.7	44
9	(Spain) María Teresa Torró Flor	51.5	22
10	(United Kingdom) Heather Watson	51.3	19

Points won returning second service
#	Player	%	Matches
1	(South Africa) Chanelle Scheepers	61.2	28
2	(Romania) Simona Halep	60.2	49
3	(Russia) Maria Sharapova	60.1	47
4	(Netherlands) Kiki Bertens	59.7	17
5	(Poland) Agnieszka Radwańska	59.7	53
6	(China) Li Na	59.5	35
7	(Slovakia) Dominika Cibulková	59.5	36
8	(Spain) Lara Arruabarrena	58.9	17
9	(Kazakhstan) Yaroslava Shvedova	58.6	28
10	(Denmark) Caroline Wozniacki	58.6	46

Return games won
#	Player	%	Matches
1	(South Africa) Chanelle Scheepers	48.8	28
2	(Romania) Simona Halep	48.7	49
3	(Poland) Agnieszka Radwańska	47.4	53
4	(Italy) Sara Errani	46.3	48
5	(Russia) Maria Sharapova	46.2	47
6	(China) Li Na	46.0	35
7	(Romania) Monica Niculescu	45.4	30
8	(Germany) Annika Beck	45.4	33
9	(Slovakia) Dominika Cibulková	45.1	43
10	(Spain) Carla Suárez Navarro	45.0	59

== Points distribution ==
The points distribution was modified for the 2014 season. Main draw rounds usually give a little less points, but there is no change for the champion (W). Points for qualifying rounds (Q) have changed in both directions depending on the tournament category. Points earned in 2013 retain their value until they expire after 52 weeks.

Category	W	F	SF	QF	R16	R32	R64	R128	Q	Q3	Q2	Q1
Grand Slam (S)	2000	1300	780	430	240	130	70	10	40	30	20	2
Grand Slam (D)	2000	1300	780	430	240	130	10	–	40	–	–	–
WTA Championships (S)	+810	+360	(230 for each round robin win, 70 for each loss)									
WTA Championships (D)	1500	1050	780	460	–							
WTA Premier Mandatory (96S)	1000	650	390	215	120	65	35	10	30	–	20	2
WTA Premier Mandatory (64/60S)	1000	650	390	215	120	65	10	–	30	–	20	2
WTA Premier Mandatory (28/32D)	1000	650	390	215	120	10	–	–	–	–	–	–
WTA Premier 5 (56S,64Q)	900	585	350	190	105	60	1	–	30	22	15	1
WTA Premier 5 (56S,48/32Q)	900	585	350	190	105	60	1	–	30	–	20	1
WTA Premier 5 (28D)	900	585	350	190	105	1	–	–	–	–	–	–
WTA Premier 5 (16D)	900	585	350	190	1	–	–	–	–	–	–	–
WTA Premier (56S)	470	305	185	100	55	30	1	–	25	–	13	1
WTA Premier (32S)	470	305	185	100	55	1	–	–	25	18	13	1
WTA Premier (16D)	470	305	185	100	1	–	–	–	–	–	–	–
Tournament of Champions	+195	+75	(60 for each round robin win, 25 for each loss)									
WTA International (32S,32Q)	280	180	110	60	30	1	–	–	18	14	10	1
WTA International (32S,16Q)	280	180	110	60	30	1	–	–	18	–	12	1
WTA International (16D)	280	180	110	60	1	–	–	–	–	–	–	–

== Retirements ==
Following is a list of notable players (winners of a main tour title, and/or part of the WTA rankings top 100 (singles) or (doubles) for at least one week) who announced their retirement from professional tennis, became inactive (after not playing for more than 52 weeks), or were permanently banned from playing, during the 2014 season:

List of Retirements
- Gréta Arn (born 13 April 1979 in Budapest, Hungary), joined the pro tour in 1997, reaching a career high singles ranking of number 40 in 2011. Arn won two singles titles on the WTA tour. In Grand Slams, she reached the third round twice; first at the 2012 Australian Open and then in the same year at the US Open. She was an active part on the Hungarian Fed Cup team, playing 13 ties between 2008 and 2013. She decided to retire in January 2014 at the age of 34.
- Kristina Barrois (born 30 September 1981 in Ottweiler, Germany), turned pro in 2005, reaching a career high singles ranking of number 57 in 2011 and a highest doubles ranking of number 55 in 2012. At the Luxembourg Open in October 2014, Barrois announced her intent to retire at the conclusion of the event, and though she lost to Lucie Hradecká in the singles, she claimed her first ever WTA title in the final match of her career – the doubles final paired with Timea Bacsinszky.
- (United Kingdom) Sarah Borwell (born 20 August 1979 in Middlesbrough, Great Britain), turned pro in 2002, reaching a career high singles ranking of number 199 in 2006. Highest doubles ranking of number 65 in 2010. She retired from professional tennis at the age of 34.
- Mallory Burdette (born 28 January 1991 in Macon, Georgia, United States), turned pro in 2012, reaching a career high singles ranking of number 68 in 2013. She reached the third round of the 2012 US Open. She retired from professional tennis in October 2014, after being inactive for a year due to a shoulder injury, at the age of 23.
- Catalina Castaño (born 7 July 1979 in Pereira, Colombia), turned pro in 1998, reaching a career high singles ranking of number 35 on 10 July 2006. Her highest doubles ranking was number 71 on 8 July 2013. Castaño won two doubles titles on the WTA tour. She retired from professional tennis in July 2014 at the age of 35, after being diagnosed with breast cancer.
- Stéphanie Dubois (born 31 October 1986 in Laval, Quebec, Canada), turned pro in 2004, reaching a career high singles ranking of number 87 in 2012. Her highest doubles ranking was number 102 in 2008. She retired from professional tennis in September 2014, after losing to Julia Görges in the first round of the Coupe Banque Nationale, at the age of 27.
- Christina Fusano (born November 27, 1980, in Sacramento, California, United States), turned pro in 2003, reaching a career high singles ranking of number 417 in 2005 and a highest doubles ranking of number 84 in 2008. She retired from professional tennis in 2014 at the age of 33.
- Angela Haynes (born 27 September 1984 in Bellflower, California, United States), turned pro in 2002, reaching a career high singles ranking of number 95 in 2005. Highest doubles ranking of number 86 in 2008. She retired from professional tennis in 2014 at the age of 29.
- Mervana Jugić-Salkić (born 14 May 1980 in Zenica, Bosnia and Herzegovina), turned pro in 1999, reaching a career high singles ranking of number 99 in 2004. Highest doubles ranking of number 59 in 2006. Jugić-Salkić won two doubles titles on the WTA tour. She retired from professional tennis in 2014 at the age of 33.
- Anne Kremer (born 17 October 1975 in Luxembourg, Luxembourg), turned pro in 1998, reaching a career high singles ranking of number 18 in 2002. Kremer won two singles titles on the WTA tour. She retired from professional tennis in 2014 after BGL Luxembourg Open at the age of 38.
- (Russia) Regina Kulikova (born January 30, 1989, in Almaty, Kazakhstan), turned pro in 2004, reaching a career high singles ranking of number 65 in 2010. Highest doubles ranking of number 226 in 2011. She retired from professional tennis in 2014 at the age of 25.
- Li Na (born 26 February 1982 in Wuhan, China), turned pro in 1999, reaching a career high singles ranking of number 2 in 2014. She also historically won 2 grand slam singles titles at the 2011 French Open and the 2014 Australian Open, becoming the first Chinese national to become a grand slam singles champion. Li reached 4 grand slam finals in her career as well as 6 grand slam semi-finals. She has won 9 WTA titles while reaching 21 finals. Among her other feats were becoming the first Chinese player to win a WTA title, the first to win a Premier-level title, the first to compete in singles at the WTA Finals, and the first to crack the Top 20, the Top 10, and the Top 5 on the WTA rankings. Li is known for her fiery cross-court forehand as well as her hilarious on court speeches, famously poking fun at her husband Jiang Shan. Li has been coached by famous tennis coach Thomas Högstedt, as well as Justine Henin's former coach Carlos Rodríguez. Li began the 2014 season in top form winning the first grand slam of the year. After having a clay and grass season filled with injuries and early defeats, Li decided not to play the summer hard court season due to a left knee injury which required surgery. On 19 September 2014 Li announced her retirement via an open letter. She was number 6 at the time of her retirement.
- Sanda Mamić (born 22 March 1985 in Zagreb, Croatia), turned pro in 2004, reaching a career high singles ranking of number 83 in 2005. She retired from professional tennis in 2014 at the age of 28.
- (Czech Republic) Iveta Melzer (born 1 February 1983 in Most, Czechoslovakia) joined the pro tour in 1998, reaching a career high singles ranking of number 25 in 2009 and a career high doubles ranking of number 17 in 2011. Melzer won two singles titles and fourteen doubles titles on the WTA tour. In Grand Slams, she reached the fourth round two times at the 2011 Australian Open and 2012 Australian Open. In doubles she reached a quarterfinal on the 2011 US Open. But her highest result is the mixed title at the 2011 Wimbledon, won in pair with her fiancée Jürgen Melzer. She was an active part on the Czech Fed Cup team, playing 13 ties between 2002 and 2012. She decided to retire in August 2014 at the age of 31.
- (Czech Republic) Michaela Paštiková (born 27 March 1980 in Šumperk, Czechoslovakia)joined the pro tour in 1996, reaching a career high singles ranking of number 89 in 2005 and a career high doubles ranking of number 35 in 2005. Paštiková won one doubles titles on the WTA tour. In Grand Slams doubles she reached a semifinal on the 2005 Australian Open.She retired from professional tennis in 2014 at the age of 34.
- Dinara Safina (born 27 April 1986 in Moscow, Russia) is a former World No. 1 Russian professional tennis player. She turned pro in 2000, and won twelve singles and nine doubles titles on the WTA tour. She first reached the top of the women's rankings on 20 April 2009, holding the position for a total of 26 weeks. She and her brother, Marat Safin, is the only brother-sister pair to reach the top of the rankings on both the ATP and WTA Tour. Safina was the runner-up at the 2008 French Open, 2009 Australian Open, and the 2009 French Open, falling to Ana Ivanovic, Serena Williams, and Svetlana Kuznetsova, respectively. She also had success on the doubles tour, winning a Grand Slam doubles title at the 2007 US Open with Nathalie Dechy, and reached a high of no. 8 on the doubles ranking, on 12 May 2008. On the international stage, Safina won the Olympic silver medal in women's singles at the 2008 Summer Olympics in Beijing, where Russia swept the podium at the event. Safina had been troubled by a back injury throughout her career. Her last professional match was at the 2011 Mutua Madrid Open, where she lost to Julia Görges in the second round. After 3 years of inactivity, she finally decided to officially retire from the tour in 2014 at the Mutua Madrid Open.
- Meghann Shaughnessy (born 13 April 1979 in Richmond, Virginia, United States), turned pro in 1996, reaching a career high singles ranking of number 11 in 2001, and a highest doubles ranking of number 4 in 2005. Shaughnessy won six singles titles on the WTA tour, and in 2003 reached her first career Slam quarterfinal at the Australian Open. She retired from professional tennis in 2014 at the age of 34.
- (Czech Republic) Hana Šromová (born 10 April 1978 in Kopřivnice, Czechoslovakia), turned pro in 1997, reaching a career high singles ranking of number 87 in 2006. Her highest doubles ranking was number 63 in 2006. She retired from professional tennis in 2014, at the age of 35.
- Paola Suárez (born June 23, 1976, in Buenos Aires, Argentina), turned pro in 1991, doubles she was a former world no. 1. reaching a career high singles ranking of number 9 in 2004 and a career high doubles ranking of number 1 in 2002. She has won 8 doubles Grand Slam (with Virginia Ruano Pascual), Suárez won four singles titles and forty-four doubles titles on the WTA tour. Suárez first retired in 2007. She returned from retirement in 2012, partnering with Gisela Dulko at the 2012 Copa Sony Ericsson Colsanitas, but they lost in the first round. The pair played at the London Summer Olympic Games, where they also lost in the first round. She retired for the second time 2014 season.
- Yuan Meng (born 9 May 1986 in Changsha, Hunan, China), turned pro in 2003, reaching a career high singles ranking of number 86 in 2008. In Grand Slams, she reached the second round twice, 2006 and 2008, first in the Australian Open. She retired from professional tennis in 2014 at the age of 27.

== Comebacks ==
Following are notable players who will come back after retirements during the 2014 WTA Tour season:

List of comebacks
- (Czech Republic) Nicole Vaidišová (born 23 April 1989 in Nuremberg, West Germany), turned professional in 2003 (first retirement in 2010). She is a former world No. 7 in singles, a six-time WTA champion and two-time Grand Slam semifinalist. She returned to the tour, receiving a wildcard to compete in Coleman Vision Tennis Championships, an ITF $75,000 event, starting on September 15.

== Awards ==
The winners of the 2014 WTA Awards were announced throughout the last two weeks of November.

List of Award Winners
- Player of the Year – (United States) Serena Williams
- Doubles Team of the Year – (Italy) Sara Errani and (Italy) Roberta Vinci
- Most Improved Player – (Canada) Eugenie Bouchard
- Comeback Player of the Year – (Croatia) Mirjana Lučić-Baroni
- Newcomer of the Year – (Switzerland) Belinda Bencic
- Diamond Aces – (Czech Republic) Petra Kvitová
- Player Service – (Czech Republic) Lucie Šafářová
- Karen Krantzcke Sportsmanship Award – (Czech Republic) Petra Kvitová
- Fan Favorite Singles Player – (Poland) Agnieszka Radwańska
- Fan Favorite Doubles Team – (Italy) Sara Errani and (Italy) Roberta Vinci
- Fan Favorite Twitter – (Denmark) Caroline Wozniacki
- Fan Favorite Facebook – (Russia) Maria Sharapova
- Fan Favorite Video – 2014 WTA Finals Best Moments
- Fan Favorite WTA Live Show – Pre-Wimbledon Party
- Fan Favorite Shot of the Year – (Poland) Agnieszka Radwańska (Montréal SF)
- Fan Favorite Match of the Year – (United States) Serena Williams vs. (Denmark) Caroline Wozniacki, 2014 WTA Finals
- Fan Favorite Grand Slam Match of the Year – (Russia) Maria Sharapova vs. (Romania) Simona Halep, 2014 French Open final

== See also ==
- 2014 WTA 125K series
- 2014 ITF Women's Circuit
- 2014 ATP World Tour
