= 2014 Brasil Tennis Cup =

- Date: February 23 – March 1
- Edition: 2nd
- Category: WTA International
- Draw: 32S / 16D
- Prize money: $250,000
- Surface: Hard
- Location: Florianópolis, Brazil

Champions

Singles
- (Czech Republic) Klára Zakopalová

Doubles
- (Spain) Anabel Medina Garrigues / (Kazakhstan) Yaroslava Shvedova
- Brasil Tennis Cup

The 2014 Brasil Tennis Cup was a women's tennis tournament played on outdoor hard courts. It was the 2nd edition of the Brasil Tennis Cup, in the International category of the 2014 WTA Tour. It took place in Florianópolis, Brazil, from February 23 through March 1, 2014.

== Finals ==
=== Singles ===
- (Czech Republic) Klára Zakopalová defeated (Spain) Garbiñe Muguruza, 4–6, 7–5, 6–0

=== Doubles ===
- (Spain) Anabel Medina Garrigues / (Kazakhstan) Yaroslava Shvedova defeated (Italy) Francesca Schiavone / (Spain) Sílvia Soler Espinosa, 7–6^{(7–1)}, 2–6, [10–3]

== Points and prize money ==
=== Point distribution ===
Event	W	F	SF	QF	Round of 16	Round of 32	Q	Q2	Q1
Singles	280	180	110	60	30	1	18	12	1
Doubles	280	180	110	60	1	—N/a	—N/a	—N/a	—N/a

=== Prize money ===
Event	W	F	SF	QF	Round of 16	Round of 32	Q2	Q1
Singles	$43,000	$21,400	$11,500	$6,175	$3,400	$2,100	$1,020	$600
Doubles	$12,300	$6,400	$3,435	$1,820	$960	—N/a	—N/a	—N/a

== Singles main-draw entrants ==
=== Seeds ===
Country	Player	Rank^{1}	Seed
ESP	Carla Suárez Navarro	16	1
ESP	Garbiñe Muguruza	34	2
CZE	Klára Zakopalová	35	3
ITA	Francesca Schiavone	43	4
ROU	Monica Niculescu	53	5
ROU	Alexandra Cadanțu	60	6
ESP	María Teresa Torró Flor	63	7
ARG	Paula Ormaechea	65	8

- Rankings are as of February 17, 2014.

=== Other entrants ===
The following players received wildcards into the singles main draw:

- (Brazil) Gabriela Cé
- (Brazil) Paula Cristina Gonçalves
- (Brazil) Beatriz Haddad Maia

The following player received entry as a special exempt:

- (Brazil) Teliana Pereira

The following players received entry from the qualifying draw:

- (Romania) Alexandra Dulgheru
- (Colombia) Mariana Duque Mariño
- (Kazakhstan) Sesil Karatantcheva
- (Montenegro) Danka Kovinić
- (France) Alizé Lim
- (Belgium) Alison Van Uytvanck

=== Retirements ===
- (Romania) Alexandra Dulgheru (lower back injury)
- (Romania) Monica Niculescu (right foot injury)

== Doubles main-draw entrants ==
=== Seeds ===
Country	Player	Country	Player	Rank^{1}	Seed
USA	Vania King	CZE	Barbora Záhlavová-Strýcová	81	1
~~ROU~~	~~Monica Niculescu~~	~~CZE~~	~~Klára Zakopalová~~	~~84~~	~~2~~
ESP	Anabel Medina Garrigues	KAZ	Yaroslava Shvedova	89	3
CRO	Darija Jurak	SLO	Andreja Klepač	119	4

- Rankings are as of February 17, 2014.

=== Other entrants ===
The following pairs received wildcards into the doubles main draw:

- (Brazil) Maria Fernanda Alves / (Brazil) Beatriz Haddad Maia
- (Brazil) Paula Cristina Gonçalves / (Brazil) Laura Pigossi

The following pair received entry as alternates:

- (Israel) Julia Glushko / (Poland) Paula Kania

=== Withdrawals ===
Before the tournament

- (Czech Republic) Klára Zakopalová (viral chest infection)
