= 2014 WTA Awards =

Details

Achievements (singles)

Awards
- Player of the year: (United States) Serena Williams
- Most improved player of the year: (Canada) Eugenie Bouchard
- Newcomer of the year: (Switzerland) Belinda Bencic
- Comeback player of the year: (Croatia) Mirjana Lučić-Baroni

The 2014 WTA Awards are a series of awards given by the Women's Tennis Association to players who have achieved something remarkable during the 2014 WTA Tour.

== The awards ==
These awards are decided by either the media, the players, the association, or the fans. Nominees were announced by the WTA's Twitter account.

Note: award winners in bold

=== Player of the Year ===
- (China) Li Na
- (Romania) Simona Halep
- (United States) **Serena Williams**
- (Russia) Maria Sharapova
- (Czech Republic) Petra Kvitová
- (Serbia) Ana Ivanovic

=== Doubles Team of the Year ===
- (Zimbabwe) Cara Black & (India) Sania Mirza
- (Italy) **Sara Errani & (Italy) Roberta Vinci**
- (Russia) Ekaterina Makarova & (Russia) Elena Vesnina
- (Chinese Taipei) Hsieh Su-wei & (China) Peng Shuai

=== Most Improved Player of the Year ===
- (France) Caroline Garcia
- (United States) Coco Vandeweghe
- (Canada) **Eugenie Bouchard**
- (Czech Republic) Karolína Plíšková
- (Australia) Casey Dellacqua

=== Newcomer of the Year ===
- (United States) Shelby Rogers
- (Japan) Kurumi Nara
- (Kazakhstan) Zarina Diyas
- (Switzerland) **Belinda Bencic**

=== Comeback Player of the Year ===
- (Australia) Jarmila Gajdošová
- (Switzerland) Timea Bacsinszky
- (Spain) Garbiñe Muguruza
- (Russia) Maria Sharapova
- (Croatia) **Mirjana Lučić-Baroni**
- (United Kingdom) Heather Watson

=== Diamond Aces ===
- (Czech Republic) **Petra Kvitová**

=== Fan Favourite Singles Player ===
- (United States) Serena Williams
- (Russia) Maria Sharapova
- (Romania) Simona Halep
- (Czech Republic) Petra Kvitová
- (Serbia) Ana Ivanovic
- (Poland) **Agnieszka Radwańska**
- (Canada) Eugenie Bouchard
- (Denmark) Caroline Wozniacki
- (Germany) Angelique Kerber
- (Slovakia) Dominika Cibulková
- (Russia) Ekaterina Makarova
- (Germany) Andrea Petkovic
- (Italy) Sara Errani
- (Serbia) Jelena Janković
- (United States) Venus Williams
- (France) Alizé Cornet
- (Spain) Garbiñe Muguruza
- (Germany) Sabine Lisicki
- (Belarus) Victoria Azarenka

=== Fan Favourite Doubles Team ===
- (Italy) **Sara Errani & (Italy) Roberta Vinci**
- (Chinese Taipei) Su-Wei Hsieh & (China) Peng Shuai
- (Zimbabwe) Cara Black & (India) Sania Mirza
- (Russia) Ekaterina Makarova & (Russia) Elena Vesnina
- (United States) Racquel Kops-Jones & (United States) Abigail Spears
- (Czech Republic) Květa Peschke & (Slovenia) Katarina Srebotnik
- (Spain) Garbiñe Muguruza & (Spain) Carla Suárez Navarro
- (Russia) Alla Kudryavtseva & (Australia) Anastasia Rodionova
- (Switzerland) Martina Hingis & (Italy) Flavia Pennetta

=== Fan Favourite Player on Twitter ===
- (United States) Serena Williams
- (Russia) Maria Sharapova
- (Czech Republic) Petra Kvitová
- (Serbia) Ana Ivanovic
- (Canada) Eugenie Bouchard
- (Denmark) **Caroline Wozniacki**
- (Germany) Andrea Petkovic
- (Italy) Sara Errani
- (United States) Venus Williams
- (France) Alizé Cornet
- (Spain) Garbiñe Muguruza
- (Germany) Sabine Lisicki
- (Belarus) Victoria Azarenka
- (United States) Sloane Stephens
- (Puerto Rico) Monica Puig
- (United Kingdom) Laura Robson

=== Fan Favourite Player on Facebook ===
- (United States) Serena Williams
- (Russia) **Maria Sharapova**
- (Romania) Simona Halep
- (Czech Republic) Petra Kvitová
- (Serbia) Ana Ivanovic
- (Poland) Agnieszka Radwańska
- (Canada) Eugenie Bouchard
- (Denmark) Caroline Wozniacki
- (Germany) Angelique Kerber
- (Italy) Sara Errani
- (United States) Venus Williams
- (France) Alizé Cornet
- (Spain) Garbiñe Muguruza
- (Germany) Sabine Lisicki
- (Belarus) Victoria Azarenka
- (Puerto Rico) Monica Puig

=== Fan Favourite WTA Video of the Year ===
- USANA Game Faces
- Lucie Šafářová Indian Wells Hot Air Balloon
- Agnieszka Radwańska Fan Chat #AAHfancast | WTA Finals
- Dubai Duty Free Travel Show with Caroline Wozniacki
- Road to Singapore: The Series presented by Xerox | Episode 10
- **2014 WTA Finals Best Moments**()

=== Fan Favourite WTA Live Show of the Year ===
- Rio Open
- Family Circle Cup
- **Pre-Wimbledon Party**()
- Rogers Cup
- Western & Southern Open
- WTA Finals

=== Fan Favorite WTA Shot of the Year ===
- (Germany) Angelique Kerber, 2014 Qatar Total Open semifinal (9%)
- (Canada) Eugenie Bouchard, 2014 Portugal Open first round (15%)
- (Poland) **Agnieszka Radwańska, 2014 Rogers Cup semifinal (45%)**()
- (Serbia) Ana Ivanovic, 2014 Tokyo Open semifinal (31%)

=== Fan Favorite WTA Match of the Year ===
- (Belarus) Victoria Azarenka vs. (Serbia) Jelena Janković, Brisbane
- (Romania) Simona Halep vs. (Canada) Eugenie Bouchard, Indian Wells
- (Slovakia) Dominika Cibulková vs. (Poland) Agnieszka Radwańska, Miami
- (Russia) Maria Sharapova vs. (Romania) Simona Halep, Madrid
- (Italy) Sara Errani vs. (China) Li Na, Rome
- (United States) Madison Keys vs. (Germany) Angelique Kerber, Eastbourne
- (United States) Venus Williams vs. (Germany) Angelique Kerber, Montreal
- (Serbia) Ana Ivanovic vs. (Russia) Maria Sharapova, Cincinnati
- (Switzerland) Timea Bacsinszky vs. (Russia) Maria Sharapova, Wuhan
- (United States) **Serena Williams vs. (Denmark) Caroline Wozniacki, WTA Finals**()

=== Fan Favorite Grand Slam Match of the Year ===
- (China) Li Na vs. (Czech Republic) Lucie Šafářová, Australian Open
- (Poland) Agnieszka Radwańska vs. (Belarus) Victoria Azarenka, Australian Open
- (Russia) Svetlana Kuznetsova vs. (Czech Republic) Petra Kvitová, French Open
- (Russia) **Maria Sharapova vs. (Romania) Simona Halep, French Open**()
- (Czech Republic) Petra Kvitová vs. (United States) Venus Williams, Wimbledon
- (Germany) Angelique Kerber vs. (Russia) Maria Sharapova, Wimbledon
- (Serbia) Aleksandra Krunić vs. (Belarus) Victoria Azarenka, US Open
- (Denmark) Caroline Wozniacki vs. (Russia) Maria Sharapova, US Open

=== Best Dress ===
- (United States) Serena Williams, US Open
- (Poland) Agnieszka Radwańska, Rome
- (Russia) Maria Sharapova, French Open
- (Serbia) Ana Ivanovic, French Open
- (Serbia) Jelena Janković, French Open
- (United States) **Venus Williams, Wimbledon**
- (Denmark) Caroline Wozniacki, Australian Open

=== Tweet of the Year ===
- (Czech Republic) Petra Kvitová
- (Denmark) Caroline Wozniacki
- (Germany) Sabine Lisicki
- (United States) Serena Williams
- (Russia) **Maria Sharapova**

=== Selfie of the Year ===
- (Serbia) Ana Ivanovic
- (United Kingdom) Heather Watson
- (Denmark) **Caroline Wozniacki**
- (Canada) Eugenie Bouchard
- (Russia) Maria Sharapova

=== Twitter Mirror Photo of the Year ===
- (Romania) **Halep, (Denmark) Wozniacki, (Serbia) Ivanovic, (Czech Republic) Kvitová, (Poland) Radwańska & (Canada) Bouchard at WTA Finals Draw Ceremony**
- (United States) Serena Williams at WTA Finals
- (Romania) Simona Halep at WTA Finals
- (Poland) Agnieszka & (Poland) Urszula Radwańska at WTA Pre-Wimbledon Party
- (China) Li Na at WTA Pre-Wimbledon Party

=== Karen Krantzcke Sportsmanship Award ===
- (Czech Republic) **Petra Kvitová**

=== Peachy Kellmeyer Player Service Award ===
- (Czech Republic) **Lucie Šafářová**
