= 2014 Porsche Tennis Grand Prix – Doubles =

Doubles
- 2014 Porsche Tennis Grand Prix

Final
- Champions: (Italy) Sara Errani (Italy) Roberta Vinci
- Runners-up: (Zimbabwe) Cara Black (India) Sania Mirza
- Score: 6–2, 6–3

Details
- Draw: 16
- Seeds: 4

Events
Singles	Doubles
- Porsche Tennis Grand Prix

Mona Barthel and Sabine Lisicki were the defending champions but Lisicki decided not to participate. Barthel played alongside Eva Birnerová, but lost in the first round to alternates Antonia Lottner and Anna Zaja.

Sara Errani and Roberta Vinci won the title, defeating Cara Black and Sania Mirza in the final, 6–2, 6–3.

== Seeds ==
1. (Italy) Sara Errani / (Italy) Roberta Vinci (champions)
2. (Zimbabwe) Cara Black / (India) Sania Mirza (final)
3. (Russia) Anastasia Pavlyuchenkova / (Slovenia) Katarina Srebotnik (first round)
4. (Czech Republic) Andrea Hlaváčková / (Czech Republic) Lucie Šafářová (withdrew because of Hlaváčková's viral illness)

== Draw ==
Key

- Q = Qualifier
- WC = Wild card
- LL = Lucky loser
- Alt = Alternate
- ITF = ITF entry
- PR = Protected ranking
- SR = Special ranking
- SE = Special exempt
- JE = Junior exempt
- JR = Junior Accelerator Programme entrant
- CO = College Accelerator Programme entrant
- NG = Next Gen Accelerator Program entrant
- w/o = Walkover
- r = Retired
- d = Defaulted

=== Draw ===
First round
1	(Italy) S Errani (Italy) R Vinci	6	6
(Germany) J Görges (Germany) A-L Grönefeld	2	2
(Canada) G Dabrowski (Poland) A Rosolska	7	3	[8]
(Serbia) T Mirčić (France) L Thorpe	5	6	[10]
3	(Russia) A Pavlyuchenkova (Slovenia) K Srebotnik	7	3	[8]
(Latvia) D Marcinkēviča (Belarus) A Sasnovich	5	6	[10]
(Georgia (country)) O Kalashnikova (Romania) R Olaru	3	0
(Serbia) J Janković (Russia) A Kleybanova	6	6
(Poland) K Jans-Ignacik (Croatia) A Tomljanović	2	6	5
(United States) L Huber (Slovakia) J Husárová	6	4	[10]
(Germany) M Barthel (Czech Republic) E Birnerová	6	4	[8]
Alt	(Germany) A Lottner (Germany) A Zaja	4	6	[10]
(Greece) E Daniilidou (Croatia) M Lučić-Baroni	6^{0}	6	[5]
(Germany) K Barrois (Germany) A Beck	7^{7}	1	[10]
(Germany) A Kerber (Germany) A Petkovic	6	2	[7]
2	(Zimbabwe) C Black (India) S Mirza	4	6	[10]

Quarterfinals
1	(Italy) S Errani (Italy) R Vinci	6	6
(Serbia) T Mirčić (France) L Thorpe	2	2
(Latvia) D Marcinkēviča (Belarus) A Sasnovich	3	0
(Serbia) J Janković (Russia) A Kleybanova	6	6
(United States) L Huber (Slovakia) J Husárová	3	4
Alt	(Germany) A Lottner (Germany) A Zaja	6	6
(Germany) K Barrois (Germany) A Beck	3	6	[8]
2	(Zimbabwe) C Black (India) S Mirza	6	2	[10]

Semifinals
1	(Italy) S Errani (Italy) R Vinci	6	6
(Serbia) J Janković (Russia) A Kleybanova	3	3
Alt	(Germany) A Lottner (Germany) A Zaja	2	6	[4]
2	(Zimbabwe) C Black (India) S Mirza	6	2	[10]

Final
1	(Italy) S Errani (Italy) R Vinci	6	6
2	(Zimbabwe) C Black (India) S Mirza	2	3
