= 2014 Brasil Tennis Cup – Doubles =

Doubles
- 2014 Brasil Tennis Cup

Final
- Champions: (Spain) Anabel Medina Garrigues (Kazakhstan) Yaroslava Shvedova
- Runners-up: (Italy) Francesca Schiavone (Spain) Sílvia Soler Espinosa
- Score: 7–6^{(7–1)}, 2–6, [10–3]

Details
- Draw: 16
- Seeds: 4

Events
Singles	Doubles
← 2013 ·	Brasil Tennis Cup	· 2015 →

Anabel Medina Garrigues and Yaroslava Shvedova were the defending champions and successfully defended their title, defeating Francesca Schiavone and Sílvia Soler Espinosa in the final, 7–6^{(7–1)}, 2–6, [10–3].

== Seeds ==
1. (United States) Vania King / (Czech Republic) Barbora Záhlavová-Strýcová (semifinals)
2. (Romania) Monica Niculescu / (Czech Republic) Klára Zakopalová (withdrew)
3. (Spain) Anabel Medina Garrigues / (Kazakhstan) Yaroslava Shvedova (champions)
4. (Croatia) Darija Jurak / (Slovenia) Andreja Klepač (first round)

== Draw ==
=== Key ===
- Q = Qualifier
- WC = Wild card
- LL = Lucky loser
- Alt = Alternate
- SE = Special exempt
- PR = Protected ranking
- ITF = ITF entry
- JE = Junior exempt
- w/o = Walkover
- r = Retired
- d = Defaulted
- SR = Special ranking

=== Draw ===
First round
1	(United States) V King (Czech Republic) B Záhlavová-Strýcová	6	7
(Ukraine) I Buryachok (Poland) K Piter	2	5
WC	(Brazil) MF Alves (Brazil) B Haddad Maia	1	4
(Colombia) C Castaño (Colombia) M Duque Mariño	6	6
3	(Spain) A Medina Garrigues (Kazakhstan) Y Shvedova	6	6
(Ukraine) L Kichenok (Ukraine) N Kichenok	4	0
(Russia) A Panova (France) L Thorpe	6	5	[10]
(Bolivia) MF Álvarez Terán (Argentina) M Irigoyen	3	7	[8]
(Romania) I-C Begu (Russia) V Solovyeva	2	3
(Italy) F Schiavone (Spain) S Soler Espinosa	6	6
(Netherlands) A Rus (Liechtenstein) S Vogt	6	4	[10]
4	(Croatia) D Jurak (Slovenia) A Klepač	4	6	[8]
WC	(Brazil) PC Gonçalves (Brazil) L Pigossi	4	1
(Hungary) T Babos (Australia) J Gajdošová	6	6
(Australia) M Adamczak (Australia) Ar Rodionova	3	2
Alt	(Israel) J Glushko (Poland) P Kania	6	6

Quarterfinals
1	(United States) V King (Czech Republic) B Záhlavová-Strýcová	6	6
(Colombia) C Castaño (Colombia) M Duque Mariño	1	2
3	(Spain) A Medina Garrigues (Kazakhstan) Y Shvedova	6	4	[10]
(Russia) A Panova (France) L Thorpe	3	6	[7]
(Italy) F Schiavone (Spain) S Soler Espinosa	6	3	[11]
(Netherlands) A Rus (Liechtenstein) S Vogt	4	6	[9]
(Hungary) T Babos (Australia) J Gajdošová	6	3	[4]
Alt	(Israel) J Glushko (Poland) P Kania	4	6	[10]

Semifinals
1	(United States) V King (Czech Republic) B Záhlavová-Strýcová	6^{7}	1
3	(Spain) A Medina Garrigues (Kazakhstan) Y Shvedova	7^{9}	6
(Italy) F Schiavone (Spain) S Soler Espinosa	6	6
Alt	(Israel) J Glushko (Poland) P Kania	4	2

Final
3	(Spain) A Medina Garrigues (Kazakhstan) Y Shvedova	7^{7}	2	[10]
(Italy) F Schiavone (Spain) S Soler Espinosa	6^{1}	6	[3]
