= 2014 Brasil Tennis Cup – Singles =

Singles
- 2014 Brasil Tennis Cup

Final
- Champion: (Czech Republic) Klára Zakopalová
- Runner-up: (Spain) Garbiñe Muguruza
- Score: 4–6, 7–5, 6–0

Details
- Draw: 32
- Seeds: 8

Events
Singles	Doubles
- Brasil Tennis Cup

Monica Niculescu was the defending champion, but retired in the quarterfinals against Carla Suárez Navarro.
Klára Zakopalová won the title, defeating Garbiñe Muguruza in the final, 4–6, 7–5, 6–0.

== Seeds ==
1. (Spain) Carla Suárez Navarro (semifinals)
2. (Spain) Garbiñe Muguruza (final)
3. (Czech Republic) Klára Zakopalová (champion)
4. (Italy) Francesca Schiavone (first round)
5. (Romania) Monica Niculescu (quarterfinals, retired)
6. (Romania) Alexandra Cadanțu (quarterfinals)
7. (Spain) María Teresa Torró Flor (first round)
8. (Argentina) Paula Ormaechea (second round)

== Draw ==
Key

- Q = Qualifier
- WC = Wild card
- LL = Lucky loser
- Alt = Alternate
- ITF = ITF entry
- PR = Protected ranking
- SR = Special ranking
- SE = Special exempt
- JE = Junior exempt
- JR = Junior Accelerator Programme entrant
- CO = College Accelerator Programme entrant
- NG = Next Gen Accelerator Program entrant
- w/o = Walkover
- r = Retired
- d = Defaulted

=== Finals ===
Semifinals
1	(Spain) Carla Suárez Navarro	3	6	2
3	(Czech Republic) Klára Zakopalová	6	3	6
(Kazakhstan) Yaroslava Shvedova	2	3
2	(Spain) Garbiñe Muguruza	6	6

Final
3	(Czech Republic) Klára Zakopalová	4	7	6
2	(Spain) Garbiñe Muguruza	6	5	0

=== Top half ===
First round
1	(Spain) C Suárez Navarro	6	6
(Hungary) T Babos	2	2
(Netherlands) K Bertens	6	1	6
Q	(Kazakhstan) S Karatantcheva	4	6	2
WC	(Brazil) PC Gonçalves	3	1
Q	(Montenegro) D Kovinić	6	6
(Slovakia) AK Schmiedlová	0	6	2
5	(Romania) M Niculescu	6	4	6
3	(Czech Republic) K Zakopalová	6	6
(Croatia) D Vekić	3	3
(Sweden) J Larsson	6^{5}	6	4
Q	(France) A Lim	7^{7}	2	6
Q	(Romania) A Dulgheru	6	7^{7}
Q	(Colombia) M Duque Mariño	1	6^{5}
SE	(Brazil) T Pereira	6	6
7	(Spain) MT Torró Flor	4	3

Second round
1	(Spain) C Suárez Navarro	6	7^{7}
(Netherlands) K Bertens	3	6^{2}
Q	(Montenegro) D Kovinić	3	1
5	(Romania) M Niculescu	6	6
3	(Czech Republic) K Zakopalová	6	6
Q	(France) A Lim	3	3
Q	(Romania) A Dulgheru	7	6
SE	(Brazil) T Pereira	5	2

Quarterfinals
1	(Spain) C Suárez Navarro	4	6	4
5	(Romania) M Niculescu	6	0	1^{r}
3	(Czech Republic) K Zakopalová	6	5
Q	(Romania) A Dulgheru	3	2^{r}

Semifinals
1	(Spain) C Suárez Navarro	3	6	2
3	(Czech Republic) K Zakopalová	6	3	6

=== Bottom half ===
First round
6	(Romania) A Cadanțu	6	6
WC	(Brazil) G Cé	1	3
(Germany) D Pfizenmaier	6	3	7
(Austria) P Mayr-Achleitner	4	6	5
(Spain) S Soler Espinosa	6^{1}	6^{1}
(Kazakhstan) Y Shvedova	7^{7}	7^{7}
(Czech Republic) B Záhlavová-Strýcová	6	1	7
4	(Italy) F Schiavone	4	6	5
8	(Argentina) P Ormaechea	6	6
WC	(Brazil) B Haddad Maia	1	2
Q	(Belgium) A Van Uytvanck	6	6
(Chinese Taipei) S-w Hsieh	3	2
(Israel) J Glushko	6	0	3
(South Africa) C Scheepers	4	6	6
(United States) V King	2	6	5
2	(Spain) G Muguruza	6	3	7

Second round
6	(Romania) A Cadanțu	6	6
(Germany) D Pfizenmaier	2	3
(Kazakhstan) Y Shvedova	6	7
(Czech Republic) B Záhlavová-Strýcová	2	5
8	(Argentina) P Ormaechea	2	2
Q	(Belgium) A Van Uytvanck	6	6
(South Africa) C Scheepers	2	1
2	(Spain) G Muguruza	6	6

Quarterfinals
6	(Romania) A Cadanțu	3	3
(Kazakhstan) Y Shvedova	6	6
Q	(Belgium) A Van Uytvanck	2	7^{7}	3
2	(Spain) G Muguruza	6	6^{1}	6

Semifinals
(Kazakhstan) Y Shvedova	2	3
2	(Spain) G Muguruza	6	6

== Qualifying ==
=== Seeds ===
1. (Spain) Anabel Medina Garrigues (first round)
2. (Ukraine) Nadiia Kichenok (qualifying competition)
3. (Colombia) Mariana Duque Mariño (qualified)
4. (Poland) Katarzyna Piter (qualifying competition)
5. (Germany) Anna-Lena Friedsam (first round)
6. (Belgium) Alison Van Uytvanck (qualified)
7. (Belgium) An-Sophie Mestach (qualifying competition)
8. (Russia) Alexandra Panova (qualifying competition)
9. (Romania) Alexandra Dulgheru (qualified)
10. (Romania) Irina-Camelia Begu (qualifying competition)
11. (France) Alizé Lim (qualified)
12. (Netherlands) Arantxa Rus (first round)

=== Qualifiers ===
1. (Kazakhstan) Sesil Karatantcheva
2. (Montenegro) Danka Kovinić
3. (Colombia) Mariana Duque Mariño
4. (Romania) Alexandra Dulgheru
5. (France) Alizé Lim
6. (Belgium) Alison Van Uytvanck

=== Qualifying draw ===
==== First qualifier ====
First round
1	(Spain) Anabel Medina Garrigues	5	2
(Kazakhstan) Sesil Karatantcheva	7	6
WC	(Brazil) Nathalia Rossi	4	1
8	(Russia) Alexandra Panova	6	6

Qualifying competition
(Kazakhstan) Sesil Karatantcheva	3	7^{7}	7^{9}
8	(Russia) Alexandra Panova	6	6^{5}	6^{7}

==== Second qualifier ====
First round
2	(Ukraine) Nadiia Kichenok	6	1
(Austria) Melanie Klaffner	2	0^{r}
(Montenegro) Danka Kovinić	4	6	6
12	(Netherlands) Arantxa Rus	6	3	4

Qualifying competition
2	(Ukraine) Nadiia Kichenok	6	1	4
(Montenegro) Danka Kovinić	2	6	6

==== Third qualifier ====
First round
3	(Colombia) Mariana Duque Mariño	7	6
WC	(Brazil) Eduarda Piai	5	3
(Poland) Paula Kania	4	1
7	(Belgium) An-Sophie Mestach	6	6

Qualifying competition
3	(Colombia) Mariana Duque Mariño	3	6	6
7	(Belgium) An-Sophie Mestach	6	3	2

==== Fourth qualifier ====
First round
4	(Poland) Katarzyna Piter	4	6	6
(Switzerland) Viktorija Golubic	6	3	3
(Liechtenstein) Stephanie Vogt	3	6	1
9	(Romania) Alexandra Dulgheru	6	3	6

Qualifying competition
4	(Poland) Katarzyna Piter	6	4	1
9	(Romania) Alexandra Dulgheru	2	6	6

==== Fifth qualifier ====
First round
5	(Germany) Anna-Lena Friedsam	4	6	2
(Argentina) María Irigoyen	6	0	6
WC	(Brazil) Laura Pigossi	3	3
11	(France) Alizé Lim	6	6

Qualifying competition
(Argentina) María Irigoyen	6	4	3
11	(France) Alizé Lim	4	6	6

==== Sixth qualifier ====
First round
6	(Belgium) Alison Van Uytvanck	6	6
Alt	(Paraguay) Verónica Cepede Royg	2	2
WC	(Brazil) Maria Fernanda Alves	2	1
10	(Romania) Irina-Camelia Begu	6	6

Qualifying competition
6	(Belgium) Alison Van Uytvanck	6	7^{8}
10	(Romania) Irina-Camelia Begu	1	6^{6}
