= 2014 Petra Kvitová tennis season =

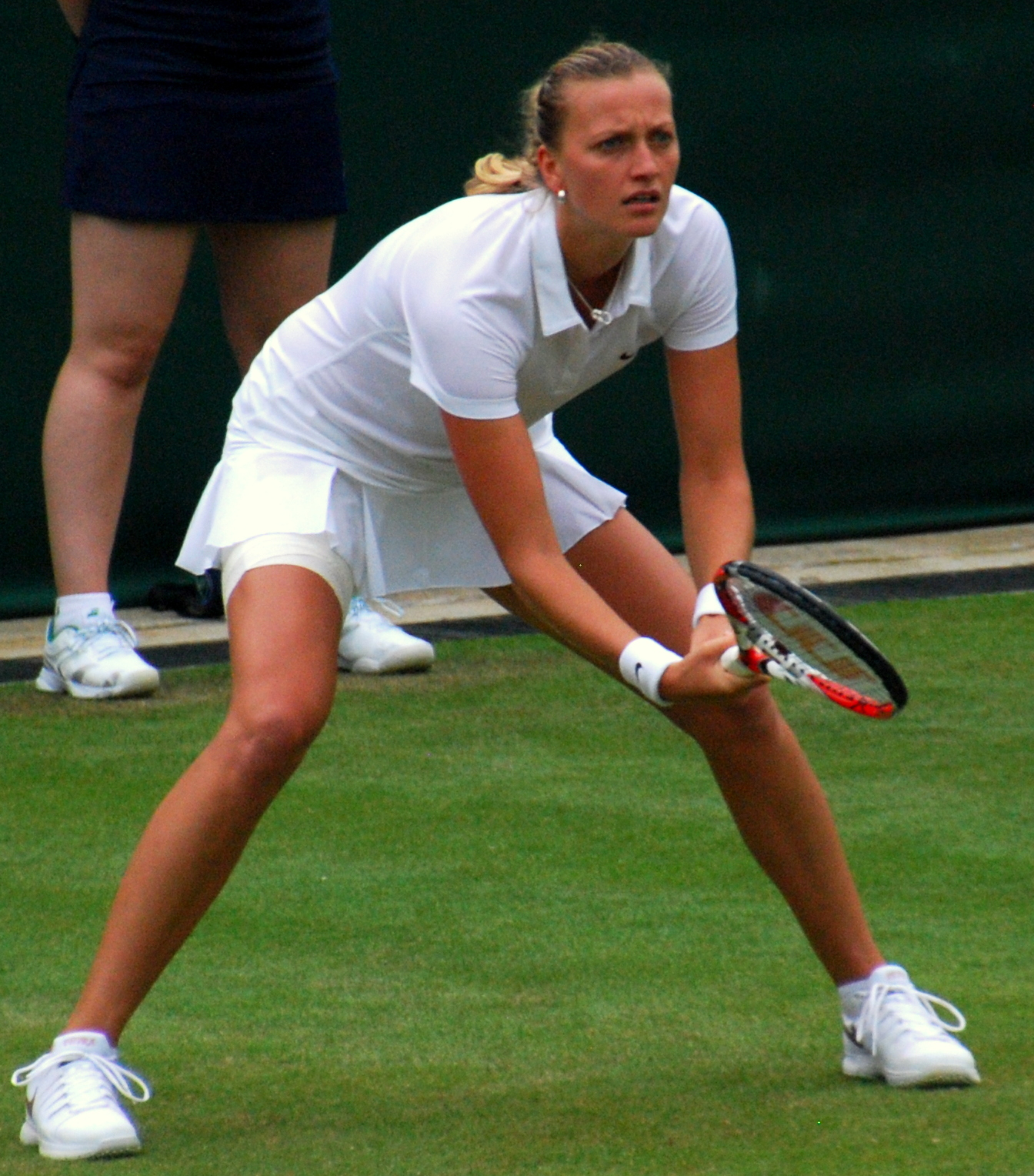
- Kvitová won her second major title at Wimbledon
- Calendar prize money: $4,853,236

Singles
- Season record: 43–16 (72.88%)
- Calendar titles: 3
- Year-end ranking: No. 4

Grand Slam & significant results
- Australian Open: 1R
- French Open: 3R
- Wimbledon: W
- US Open: 3R
- Tour Finals: RR
- Last updated on: 15 November 2014.

The 2014 Petra Kvitová tennis season officially began at the 2014 Apia International Sydney.

== Yearly summary ==
=== Early hard court season and Australian Open ===
==== Sydney International ====
Kvitová started her season in Sydney. As the second seed, she received a bye into the second round. There, she defeated qualifier Christina Mchale before going on to beat compatriot Lucie Šafářová in the last eight. In the semifinal, Kvitová suffered a shocking loss to qualifier and eventual champion Tsvetana Pironkova in straight sets.

==== Australian Open ====
Seeded sixth at the Australian Open, Kvitová drew world No. 88 Luksika Kumkhum in the opening round, and was upset by the Thai in three sets. It was Kvitová's earliest exit at a Grand Slam since 2011 US Open.

=== Middle East series ===
==== Qatar Open ====
As the third seed at the Qatar Open, Kvitová received a bye in the first round. In the second round she faced former world No. 1 Venus Williams, whom she beat in three sets. She then saw off Šafářová in the round of 16, before losing to Jelena Janković in the quarterfinals.

==== Dubai Tennis Championships ====
Kvitová failed to defend her title in Dubai, losing her opening match to Spain's Carla Suárez Navarro in three sets.

=== North American hard court season ===
==== Indian Wells Masters ====
At the 2014 BNP Paribas Open, Kvitová was seeded eighth and won her first two matches against Coco Vandeweghe and Svetlana Kuznetsova, but lost in the fourth round to Dominika Cibulková in straight sets.

==== Miami Masters ====
Kvitová was the eighth seed at the Miami Open and she reached the quarterfinals of the event for the first time in her career, having never advanced beyond third round previously. She defeated Paula Ormaechea and Donna Vekić to set up a clash with 12th seed Ana Ivanovic in the last 16. Despite losing the first set, Kvitová then double-bagelled the Serb to take the match. In the last eight, she lost to Maria Sharapova in straight sets.

=== Fed Cup semifinal ===
In her first match, Kvitová was pitted against young Italian Camila Giorgi and she won in straight sets. In the following round, she avenged her loss to Roberta Vinci from last year by defeating the veteran in straight sets as well.

=== Clay court season ===
==== Stuttgart Open ====
Kvitová, seeded third at the Stuttgart Open, suffered a shocking loss in the second round to former top 30 player Alisa Kleybanova.

==== Madrid Open ====
Seeded fifth at the Mutua Madrid Open, Kvitová won her opener against Sorana Cîrstea in three sets. Then, she defeated Varvara Lepchenko and Šafářová to reach the quarterfinals where she was supposed to play world no. 1 Serena Williams. However, her opponent conceded a walkover and Kvitová moved into semifinals where she lost to Simona Halep in three sets.

==== Italian Open ====
At the Italian Open, fifth-seeded Kvitová was defeated in her opening match by Zhang Shuai in three sets

==== French Open ====
At the French Open, Kvitová comfortably won over Zarina Diyas and Marina Erakovic in the first two rounds, before facing former champion Svetlana Kuznetsova. There, she fell to the Russian in a tight three-setter.

=== Grass court season ===
==== Eastbourne ====
Kvitová started her grass court campaign in Eastbourne. She defeated compatriot Šafářová and Lepchenko to reach the quarterfinals, where she was forced to withdraw with a hamstring injury.

==== Wimbledon ====
Kvitová entered the Wimbledon Championships as a heavy favourite, having won her maiden Grand Slam title here in 2011. After winning the first two rounds against Andrea Hlaváčková and Mona Barthel comfortably, Kvitová faced former champion Venus Williams in the third round. Similar to their Doha encounter, Kvitová was pushed to a third set. The decider featured both players playing well, with the Czech ultimately sailing through.

Kvitová secured her berth in the last eight by defeating Peng Shuai in the following round. She then beat compatriots Barbora Záhlavová-Strýcová and Šafářová in the quarterfinals and semifinals respectively. In the final, Kvitová completely outplayed 13th seed and maiden finalist Eugenie Bouchard in only 55 minutes. The match was the fifth-shortest women's final match in the tournament history.

=== US Open Series ===
==== Canadian Open ====
Kvitová officially began her US Open series campaign in Montreal. After receiving a bye in the opening round, she defeated Casey Dellacqua in her opener but then lost to eventual semifinalist Ekaterina Makarova in three sets.

==== Cincinnati Masters ====
At the Cincinnati Masters, Kvitová lost to Elina Svitolina in her opening match in straight sets.

==== Connecticut Open ====
Kvitová entered New Haven as the second seed. She defeated Makarova in straight sets in her opening match and the quarterfinals, she beat Záhlavová-Strýcová. She reached the final for the third straight year when she overcame Samantha Stosur in the last four. In the final, she faced Magdaléna Rybáriková whom she defeated in straight sets to for the title.

==== US Open ====
Kvitová was seeded third at the US Open. In the first round, she defeated France's Kristina Mladenovic. She then beat fellow Czech Petra Cetkovská. She then lost in the third round for the second straight year, this time to Serbian Aleksandra Krunić in straight sets.

=== Asian swing & WTA Finals ===
==== Wuhan Open ====
Kvitová cruised into the third round of the Wuhan Open with a win over Italian Karin Knapp. She then booked her spot in the quarterfinals with a three-set victory over compatriot Karolína Plíšková. In the last eight, she went on to defeat Frenchwoman Caroline Garcia and set up a semifinal clash with Svitolina, whom she lost to in Cincinnati in August, but Kvitová was too good this time, beating her straight sets to reach the final, where she defeated Eugenie Bouchard to win the inaugural title of the tournament.

==== China Open ====
Kvitová next played at the China Open where she was the third seed. She defeated Peng in her opening match and reached the quarterfinals after a walkover from Venus Williams. She then beat Vinci in straight sets before moving past Stosur in the last four in a three-set battle. In the final, she suffered a defeat at the hands of Sharapova.

==== WTA Finals ====
Kvitová was the third seed at the WTA Finals and was drawn into the same group as Sharapova, Agnieszka Radwańska and Caroline Wozniacki. She lost her first match against Radwańska in straight sets but then went on to upset Sharapova in straight sets, thus recording her first victory over the Russian in five attempts. Her hopes of qualifying for the semifinals were dashed when she lost to Wozniacki, finishing last in her group as a result.

=== Fed Cup final ===
Kvitová represented her home country where they faced Germany. In the opening rubber, she defeated Andrea Petkovic in straight sets. As a result of compatriot Šafářová winning the second match, the team was one win away from the title and all hopes were on Kvitová. She faced Angelique Kerber in her next match and won in tight three sets, thus helping Czech Republic claim its third Fed Cup title in four years.

== All matches ==
=== Singles matches ===
Tournament	Match #	Round	Opponent	Rank	Result	Score
Sydney International; Sydney, Australia; WTA Premier; Hard, outdoor 5–11 January 2014	–	1R	Bye			
Sydney International; Sydney, Australia; WTA Premier; Hard, outdoor 5–11 January 2014	1	2R	(United States) Christina McHale	#65	Win	6–1, 6–0
Sydney International; Sydney, Australia; WTA Premier; Hard, outdoor 5–11 January 2014	2	QF	(Czech Republic) Lucie Šafářová	#27	Win	7–6^{(7–4)}, 6–2
Sydney International; Sydney, Australia; WTA Premier; Hard, outdoor 5–11 January 2014	3	SF	(Bulgaria) Tsvetana Pironkova (Q)	#107	Loss	4–6, 3–6
Australian Open; Melbourne, Australia; Grand Slam; Hard, outdoor 13–25 January 2014	4	1R	(Thailand) Luksika Kumkhum	#88	Loss	2–6, 6–1, 4–6
Qatar Open; Doha, Qatar; WTA Premier 5 Hard, outdoor 10–16 February 2014	–	1R	Bye			
Qatar Open; Doha, Qatar; WTA Premier 5 Hard, outdoor 10–16 February 2014	5	2R	(United States) Venus Williams	#48	Win	6–2, 2–6, 7–6^{(9–7)}
Qatar Open; Doha, Qatar; WTA Premier 5 Hard, outdoor 10–16 February 2014	6	3R	(Czech Republic) Lucie Šafářová	#28	Win	7–6^{(7–2)}, 5–7, 6–2
Qatar Open; Doha, Qatar; WTA Premier 5 Hard, outdoor 10–16 February 2014	7	QF	(Serbia) Jelena Janković	#8	Loss	1–6, 3–6
Dubai Tennis Championships; Dubai, UAE; WTA Premier; Hard, outdoor 17–22 February 2014	–	1R	Bye			
Dubai Tennis Championships; Dubai, UAE; WTA Premier; Hard, outdoor 17–22 February 2014	8	2R	(Spain) Carla Suárez Navarro	#16	Loss	6–1, 4–6, 6–7^{(4–7)}
Indian Wells Masters; Indian Wells, United States; WTA Premier Mandatory; Hard, outdoor 3–16 March 2014	–	1R	Bye			
Indian Wells Masters; Indian Wells, United States; WTA Premier Mandatory; Hard, outdoor 3–16 March 2014	9	2R	(United States) Coco Vandeweghe (WC)	#108	Win	6–1, 6–3
Indian Wells Masters; Indian Wells, United States; WTA Premier Mandatory; Hard, outdoor 3–16 March 2014	10	3R	(Russia) Svetlana Kuznetsova	#30	Win	6–3, 2–6, 6–0
Indian Wells Masters; Indian Wells, United States; WTA Premier Mandatory; Hard, outdoor 3–16 March 2014	11	4R	(Slovakia) Dominika Cibulková	#11	Loss	3–6, 2–6
Miami Open; Miami, United States; WTA Premier Mandatory; Hard, outdoor 17–30 March 2014	–	1R	Bye			
Miami Open; Miami, United States; WTA Premier Mandatory; Hard, outdoor 17–30 March 2014	12	2R	(Argentina) Paula Ormaechea	#75	Win	6–3, 6–4
Miami Open; Miami, United States; WTA Premier Mandatory; Hard, outdoor 17–30 March 2014	13	3R	(Croatia) Donna Vekić (Q)	#94	Win	6–3, 6–4
Miami Open; Miami, United States; WTA Premier Mandatory; Hard, outdoor 17–30 March 2014	14	4R	(Serbia) Ana Ivanovic	#13	Win	3–6, 6–0, 6–0
Miami Open; Miami, United States; WTA Premier Mandatory; Hard, outdoor 17–30 March 2014	15	QF	(Russia) Maria Sharapova	#7	Loss	5–7, 1–6
Fed Cup Semifinals; Ostrava, Czech Republic; Fed Cup; Hard, indoor 19–20 April 2014	16	SF; R2	(Italy) Camila Giorgi	#54	Win	6–4, 6–2
Fed Cup Semifinals; Ostrava, Czech Republic; Fed Cup; Hard, indoor 19–20 April 2014	17	SF; R3	(Italy) Roberta Vinci	#20	Win	6–3, 7–5
Stuttgart Open; Stuttgart, Germany; WTA Premier; Clay, indoor 21–27 April 2014	–	1R	Bye			
Stuttgart Open; Stuttgart, Germany; WTA Premier; Clay, indoor 21–27 April 2014	18	2R	(Russia) Alisa Kleybanova	#102	Loss	2–6, 6–7^{(3–7)}
Madrid Open; Madrid, Spain; WTA Premier Mandatory; Clay, outdoor 3–11 May 2014	19	1R	(Romania) Sorana Cîrstea	#27	Win	6–1, 5–7, 7–6^{(7–4)}
Madrid Open; Madrid, Spain; WTA Premier Mandatory; Clay, outdoor 3–11 May 2014	20	2R	(United States) Varvara Lepchenko	#48	Win	2–6, 6–2, 6–1
Madrid Open; Madrid, Spain; WTA Premier Mandatory; Clay, outdoor 3–11 May 2014	21	3R	(Czech Republic) Lucie Šafářová	#25	Win	6–4, 6–3
Madrid Open; Madrid, Spain; WTA Premier Mandatory; Clay, outdoor 3–11 May 2014	–	QF	(United States) Serena Williams	#1	Walkover	N/A
Madrid Open; Madrid, Spain; WTA Premier Mandatory; Clay, outdoor 3–11 May 2014	22	SF	(Romania) Simona Halep	#5	Loss	7–6^{(7–4)}, 3–6, 2–6
Italian Open; Rome, Italy; WTA Premier 5 Clay, outdoor 12–18 May 2014	–	1R	Bye			
Italian Open; Rome, Italy; WTA Premier 5 Clay, outdoor 12–18 May 2014	23	2R	(China) Zhang Shuai	#43	Loss	6–7^{(6–8)}, 7–5, 3–6
French Open; Paris, France; Grand Slam; Clay, outdoor 25 May – 8 June 2014	24	1R	(Kazakhstan) Zarina Diyas	#86	Win	7–5, 6–2
French Open; Paris, France; Grand Slam; Clay, outdoor 25 May – 8 June 2014	25	2R	(New Zealand) Marina Erakovic	#61	Win	6–4, 6–4
French Open; Paris, France; Grand Slam; Clay, outdoor 25 May – 8 June 2014	26	3R	(Russia) Svetlana Kuznetsova	#28	Loss	7–6^{(7–3)}, 1–6, 7–9
Eastbourne International; Eastbourne, Britain; WTA Premier; Grass, outdoor 14–21 June 2014	27	1R	(Czech Republic) Lucie Šafářová	#23	Win	6–1, 5–7, 7–6^{(7–4)}
Eastbourne International; Eastbourne, Britain; WTA Premier; Grass, outdoor 14–21 June 2014	28	2R	(United States) Varvara Lepchenko	#57	Win	6–1, 6–4
Eastbourne International; Eastbourne, Britain; WTA Premier; Grass, outdoor 14–21 June 2014	–	QF	(United Kingdom) Heather Watson (WC)	#70	Walkover	N/A
Wimbledon; London, Britain; Grand Slam; Grass, outdoor 23 June – 7 July 2014	29	1R	(Czech Republic) Andrea Hlaváčková	#118	Win	6–3, 6–0
Wimbledon; London, Britain; Grand Slam; Grass, outdoor 23 June – 7 July 2014	30	2R	(Germany) Mona Barthel	#59	Win	6–2, 6–0
Wimbledon; London, Britain; Grand Slam; Grass, outdoor 23 June – 7 July 2014	31	3R	(United States) Venus Williams	#31	Win	5–7, 7–6^{(7–2)}, 7–5
Wimbledon; London, Britain; Grand Slam; Grass, outdoor 23 June – 7 July 2014	32	4R	(China) Peng Shuai	#61	Win	6–3, 6–2
Wimbledon; London, Britain; Grand Slam; Grass, outdoor 23 June – 7 July 2014	33	QF	(Czech Republic) Barbora Záhlavová Strýcová	#43	Win	6–1, 7–5
Wimbledon; London, Britain; Grand Slam; Grass, outdoor 23 June – 7 July 2014	34	SF	(Czech Republic) Lucie Šafářová	#23	Win	7–6^{(8–6)}, 6–1
Wimbledon; London, Britain; Grand Slam; Grass, outdoor 23 June – 7 July 2014	35	F	(Canada) Eugenie Bouchard	#13	Win (1)	6–3, 6–0
Canadian Open; Montreal, Canada; WTA Premier 5 Hard, outdoor 4–10 August 2014	–	1R	Bye			
Canadian Open; Montreal, Canada; WTA Premier 5 Hard, outdoor 4–10 August 2014	36	2R	(Australia) Casey Dellacqua	#31	Win	6–3, 6–2
Canadian Open; Montreal, Canada; WTA Premier 5 Hard, outdoor 4–10 August 2014	37	3R	(Russia) Ekaterina Makarova	#19	Loss	4–6, 6–1, 2–6
Cincinnati Masters; Cincinnati, USA; WTA Premier 5 Hard, outdoor 11–17 August 2014	–	1R	Bye			
Cincinnati Masters; Cincinnati, USA; WTA Premier 5 Hard, outdoor 11–17 August 2014	38	2R	(Ukraine) Elina Svitolina	#39	Loss	2–6, 6–7^{(2–7)}
Connecticut Open; New Haven, USA; WTA Premier; Hard, outdoor 17–23 August 2014	–	1R	Bye			
Connecticut Open; New Haven, USA; WTA Premier; Hard, outdoor 17–23 August 2014	39	2R	(Russia) Ekaterina Makarova	#18	Win	6–2, 6–1
Connecticut Open; New Haven, USA; WTA Premier; Hard, outdoor 17–23 August 2014	40	QF	(Czech Republic) Barbora Záhlavová Strýcová	#31	Win	6–4, 6–1
Connecticut Open; New Haven, USA; WTA Premier; Hard, outdoor 17–23 August 2014	41	SF	(Australia) Samantha Stosur	#25	Win	6–3, 6–1
Connecticut Open; New Haven, USA; WTA Premier; Hard, outdoor 17–23 August 2014	42	F	(Slovakia) Magdaléna Rybáriková	#68	Win (2)	6–4, 6–2
US Open; New York City, USA; Grand Slam; Hard, outdoor 25 August – 7 September 2014	43	1R	(France) Kristina Mladenovic	#73	Win	6–1, 6–0
US Open; New York City, USA; Grand Slam; Hard, outdoor 25 August – 7 September 2014	44	2R	(Czech Republic) Petra Cetkovská	#63	Win	6–4, 6–2
US Open; New York City, USA; Grand Slam; Hard, outdoor 25 August – 7 September 2014	45	3R	(Serbia) Aleksandra Krunić (Q)	#145	Loss	4–6, 4–6
Wuhan Open; Wuhan, China; WTA Premier 5 Hard, outdoor 21–27 September 2014	–	1R	Bye			
Wuhan Open; Wuhan, China; WTA Premier 5 Hard, outdoor 21–27 September 2014	46	2R	(Italy) Karin Knapp (Q)	#62	Win	6–3, 6–0
Wuhan Open; Wuhan, China; WTA Premier 5 Hard, outdoor 21–27 September 2014	47	3R	(Czech Republic) Karolína Plíšková	#31	Win	6–3, 2–6, 6–4
Wuhan Open; Wuhan, China; WTA Premier 5 Hard, outdoor 21–27 September 2014	48	QF	(France) Caroline Garcia	#49	Win	6–3, 6–4
Wuhan Open; Wuhan, China; WTA Premier 5 Hard, outdoor 21–27 September 2014	49	SF	(Ukraine) Elina Svitolina	#34	Win	6–3, 7–5
Wuhan Open; Wuhan, China; WTA Premier 5 Hard, outdoor 21–27 September 2014	50	F	(Canada) Eugenie Bouchard	#7	Win (3)	6–3, 6–4
China Open; Beijing, China; WTA Premier Mandatory; Hard, outdoor 29 September–5 October 2014	–	1R	Bye			
China Open; Beijing, China; WTA Premier Mandatory; Hard, outdoor 29 September–5 October 2014	51	2R	(China) Peng Shuai	#24	Win	6–4, 6–2
China Open; Beijing, China; WTA Premier Mandatory; Hard, outdoor 29 September–5 October 2014	–	3R	(United States) Venus Williams	#31	Walkover	N/A
China Open; Beijing, China; WTA Premier Mandatory; Hard, outdoor 29 September–5 October 2014	52	QF	(Italy) Roberta Vinci	#44	Win	7–6^{(7–2)}, 6–4
China Open; Beijing, China; WTA Premier Mandatory; Hard, outdoor 29 September–5 October 2014	53	SF	(Australia) Samantha Stosur	#21	Win	6–3, 5–7, 6–2
China Open; Beijing, China; WTA Premier Mandatory; Hard, outdoor 29 September–5 October 2014	54	F	(Russia) Maria Sharapova	#4	Loss (1)	4–6, 6–2, 3–6
WTA Finals; Singapore, Singapore; WTA Finals; Hard, indoor 20–26 October 2014
WTA Finals; Singapore, Singapore; WTA Finals; Hard, indoor 20–26 October 2014	55	RR	(Poland) Agnieszka Radwańska	#6	Loss	2–6, 3–6
WTA Finals; Singapore, Singapore; WTA Finals; Hard, indoor 20–26 October 2014	56	RR	(Russia) Maria Sharapova	#2	Win	6–3, 6–2
WTA Finals; Singapore, Singapore; WTA Finals; Hard, indoor 20–26 October 2014	57	RR	(Denmark) Caroline Wozniacki	#8	Loss	2–6, 3–6
Fed Cup Final; Prague, Czech Republic; Fed Cup; Hard, indoor 8–9 November 2014	58	F R1	(Germany) Andrea Petkovic	#14	Win	6–2, 6–4
Fed Cup Final; Prague, Czech Republic; Fed Cup; Hard, indoor 8–9 November 2014	59	F R2	(Germany) Angelique Kerber	#10	Win	7–6^{(7–5)}, 4–6, 6–4

== Yearly records ==
=== Head-to-head matchups ===
Ordered by number of wins, as of Fed Cup final

- (Czech Republic) Lucie Šafářová 5–0
- (Czech Republic) Barbora Záhlavová Strýcová 2–0
- (United States) Venus Williams 2–0
- (United States) Varvara Lepchenko 2–0
- (China) Peng Shuai 2–0
- (Canada) Eugenie Bouchard 2–0
- (Italy) Roberta Vinci 2–0
- (Australia) Samantha Stosur 2–0
- (United States) Christina McHale 1–0
- (United States) Coco Vandeweghe 1–0
- (Argentina) Paula Ormaechea 1–0
- (Croatia) Donna Vekić 1–0
- (Serbia) Ana Ivanovic 1–0
- (Germany) Angelique Kerber 1–0
- (Germany) Andrea Petkovic 1–0
- (Kazakhstan) Zarina Diyas 1–0
- (New Zealand) Marina Erakovic 1–0
- (Czech Republic) Andrea Hlaváčková 1–0
- (Germany) Mona Barthel 1–0
- (Romania) Sorana Cîrstea 1–0
- (Australia) Casey Dellacqua 1–0
- (Italy) Camila Giorgi 1–0
- (Slovakia) Magdaléna Rybáriková 1–0
- (Russia) Ekaterina Makarova 1–1
- (Russia) Svetlana Kuznetsova 1–1
- (Ukraine) Elina Svitolina 1–1
- (Denmark) Caroline Wozniacki 0–1
- (Poland) Agnieszka Radwańska 0–1
- (Russia) Alisa Kleybanova 0–1
- (Serbia) Jelena Janković 0–1
- (Bulgaria) Tsvetana Pironkova 0–1
- (Thailand) Luksika Kumkhum 0–1
- (Spain) Carla Suárez Navarro 0–1
- (Slovakia) Dominika Cibulková 0–1
- (Romania) Simona Halep 0–1
- (China) Shuai Zhang 0–1
- (Russia) Maria Sharapova 1–2

=== Finals ===
==== Singles: 4 (3–1) ====
Legend Grand Slams (1–0) WTA Tour Championships (0–0) WTA Premier Mandatory (0–1) WTA Premier 5 (1–0) WTA Premier (1–0) WTA International (0–0)	Finals by surface Hard (2–1) Clay (0–0) Grass (1–0)	Finals by venue Outdoors (3–1) Indoors (0–0)

Outcome	Date	Championship	Surface	Opponent in the final	Score in the final
Winner	5 July 2014	Wimbledon Championships, London, United Kingdom	Grass	(Canada) Eugenie Bouchard	6–3, 6–0
Winner	23 August 2014	Connecticut Open, New Haven, USA	Hard	(Slovakia) Magdaléna Rybáriková	6–4, 6–2
Winner	27 September 2014	Wuhan Open, Wuhan, China	Hard	(Canada) Eugenie Bouchard	6–3, 6–4
Runner-up	5 October 2014	China Open, Beijing, China	Hard	(Russia) Maria Sharapova	4–6, 6–2, 3–6

== See also ==
- 2014 Maria Sharapova tennis season
- 2014 Li Na tennis season
- 2014 Serena Williams tennis season
- 2014 WTA Tour
