= 2014 Victoria Azarenka tennis season =

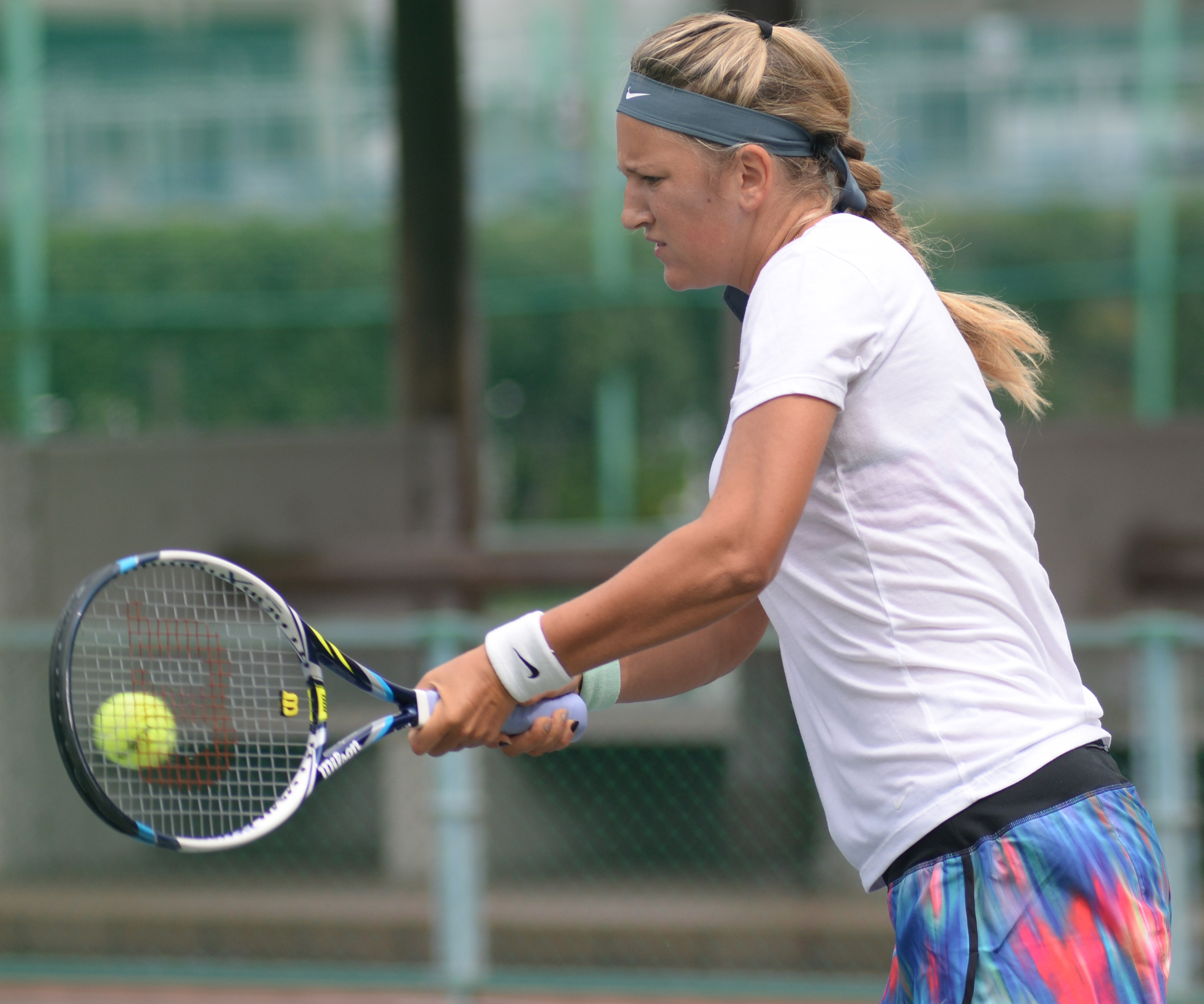
- Victoria Azarenka at the 2014 Toray Pan Pacific Open.
- Full name: Victoria Azarenka
- Country: Belarus
- Calendar prize money: $857,583

Singles
- Season record: 15–9 (62.5%)
- Current ranking: No. 31
- Ranking change from previous year: ▼29

Grand Slam & significant results
- Australian Open: QF
- French Open: A
- Wimbledon: 2R
- US Open: QF

Injuries
- Injuries: Foot injury (Doha)
- Last updated on: 8 September 2014.

The 2014 Victoria Azarenka tennis season officially began at the 2014 Brisbane International, the first of two simultaneous events which opened the 2014 season, and ended with a second round loss to Ana Ivanovic at the Pan Pacific Open in Tokyo in September.

== Yearly summary ==
=== Australian Open series ===
Azarenka began her 2014 season as the second seed at the 2014 Brisbane International, in what was her third participation at the event. She reached the final for the first time since 2009, but lost to world No. 1 Serena Williams in straight sets.

Her next tournament was the Australian Open, where she was the two-time defending champion. She failed to defend her title, losing in the quarter-finals to Agnieszka Radwańska in three sets.

=== Middle East series ===
Azarenka was due to play in the Qatar Total Open, where she was the two-time defending champion, but she withdrew before the tournament started due to a left foot injury.

=== American hard court season ===
Azarenka returned from her foot injury at the Indian Wells Masters, but she lost her first match to Lauren Davis, marking her earliest ever exit from Indian Wells. A recurrence of her foot injury at Indian Wells later forced her withdrawal from Miami for the second consecutive year.

Azarenka withdrew from the Monterrey Open for the second consecutive year.

=== Clay court season ===
Azarenka was scheduled to play at both the Madrid Open and the Italian Open, however she withdrew from both tournaments after failing to recover from a left foot injury. Her absences from both events resulted in her dropping out of the top four for the first time since May 2011. She ultimately withdrew from the French Open after failing to recover in time for the event.

=== Grass court season ===
After three months out due to a foot injury, Azarenka returned to the Tour at the Eastbourne International as a wildcard entry. She drew world No. 44 Camila Giorgi in the first round, and was defeated in three sets.

Azarenka then played at Wimbledon, where she lost in the second round for the second year running; after defeating Mirjana Lučić-Baroni in the first round for her first win since January, she lost to Bojana Jovanovski in the second in three sets.

=== US Open series ===
Azarenka started her US Open series campaign as a wildcard entry at the Bank of the West Classic in Stanford. After receiving a second round bye, she was defeated in the second round by Venus Williams in straight sets; as a result of that loss, she dropped out of the top ten for the first time since September 2010. She had marked her 200th consecutive week in the top ten in the week of Stanford.

Azarenka's spell outside the top ten lasted just one week; by reaching the quarter-finals of the Rogers Cup, where she lost to Agnieszka Radwańska for the second time this season, she re-entered the top ten in the week starting 11 August 2014 at the expense of Ana Ivanovic.

She later withdrew from the Cincinnati Masters due to a right knee injury she suffered at the Rogers Cup. This defeat has, again, seen her drop out of the top ten as she was the defending champion.

At the US Open, Azarenka reached the quarter-finals for the third consecutive year, but was upset by Ekaterina Makarova in straight sets. The loss saw Azarenka drop out of the top 20 for the first time in over six years.

=== Asian hard court season ===
After the US Open, Azarenka commenced her Asian swing at the downgraded Premier tournament in Tokyo, where she was unseeded. She defeated Kimiko Date-Krumm in the first round in three sets, before losing to fellow former world number one and eventual champion Ana Ivanovic in the second in straight sets. She was then scheduled to play at the inaugural 2014 Wuhan Open and the China Open, however she announced that she will miss the remainder of the season due to knee and foot injuries.

== All matches ==
=== Singles matches ===
Tournament	Match	Round	Opponent	Rank	Result	Score
Brisbane International; Brisbane, Australia; WTA Premier; Hard, outdoor 29 December 2013 – 5 January 2014	-	1R	Bye			
Brisbane International; Brisbane, Australia; WTA Premier; Hard, outdoor 29 December 2013 – 5 January 2014	533	2R	(Australia) Casey Dellacqua	#142	Win	6–3, 6–1
Brisbane International; Brisbane, Australia; WTA Premier; Hard, outdoor 29 December 2013 – 5 January 2014	534	QF	(Switzerland) Stefanie Vögele	#50	Win	6–4, 6–7^{(7–9)}, 6–1
Brisbane International; Brisbane, Australia; WTA Premier; Hard, outdoor 29 December 2013 – 5 January 2014	535	SF	(Serbia) Jelena Janković	#8	Win	1–6, 6–3, 6–4
Brisbane International; Brisbane, Australia; WTA Premier; Hard, outdoor 29 December 2013 – 5 January 2014	536	F	(United States) Serena Williams	#1	Loss (1)	4–6, 5–7
Australian Open; Melbourne, Australia; Grand Slam; Hard, outdoor 13–26 January 2014
Australian Open; Melbourne, Australia; Grand Slam; Hard, outdoor 13–26 January 2014	537	1R	(Sweden) Johanna Larsson	#91	Win	7–6^{(7–2)}, 6–2
Australian Open; Melbourne, Australia; Grand Slam; Hard, outdoor 13–26 January 2014	538	2R	(Czech Republic) Barbora Záhlavová-Strýcová	#84	Win	6–1, 6–4
Australian Open; Melbourne, Australia; Grand Slam; Hard, outdoor 13–26 January 2014	539	3R	(Austria) Yvonne Meusburger	#49	Win	6–1, 6–0
Australian Open; Melbourne, Australia; Grand Slam; Hard, outdoor 13–26 January 2014	540	4R	(United States) Sloane Stephens	#13	Win	6–3, 6–2
Australian Open; Melbourne, Australia; Grand Slam; Hard, outdoor 13–26 January 2014	541	QF	(Poland) Agnieszka Radwańska	#5	Loss	1–6, 7–5, 0–6
Qatar Total Open; Doha, Qatar; WTA Premier 5 Hard, outdoor 10–16 February 2014	Withdrew					
BNP Paribas Open; Indian Wells, United States of America; WTA Premier Mandatory; Hard, outdoor 3–16 March 2014
BNP Paribas Open; Indian Wells, United States of America; WTA Premier Mandatory; Hard, outdoor 3–16 March 2014	-	1R	Bye			
BNP Paribas Open; Indian Wells, United States of America; WTA Premier Mandatory; Hard, outdoor 3–16 March 2014	542	2R	(United States) Lauren Davis	#66	Loss	0–6, 6–7^{(2–7)}
Sony Open Tennis; Miami, United States of America; WTA Premier Mandatory; Hard, outdoor 19–30 March 2014	Withdrew					
Mutua Madrid Open; Madrid, Spain; WTA Premier Mandatory; Clay, outdoor 5–11 May 2014	Withdrew					
Internazionali BNL d'Italia; Rome, Italy; WTA Premier 5 Clay, outdoor 12–18 May 2014	Withdrew					
French Open; Paris, France; Grand Slam; Clay, outdoor 25 May–8 June 2014	Withdrew					
Aegon International; Eastbourne, United Kingdom; WTA Premier; Grass, outdoor 16–21 June 2014	543	1R	(Italy) Camila Giorgi	#44	Loss	6–4, 3–6, 5–7
Wimbledon Championships; London, United Kingdom; Grand Slam; Grass, outdoor 23 June–6 July 2014	544	1R	(Croatia) Mirjana Lučić-Baroni	#108	Win	6–3, 7–5
Wimbledon Championships; London, United Kingdom; Grand Slam; Grass, outdoor 23 June–6 July 2014	545	2R	(Serbia) Bojana Jovanovski	#46	Loss	3–6, 6–3, 5–7
Bank of the West Classic; Stanford, United States of America; WTA Premier; Hard, outdoor 28 July – 3 August 2014	-	1R	Bye			
Bank of the West Classic; Stanford, United States of America; WTA Premier; Hard, outdoor 28 July – 3 August 2014	546	2R	(United States) Venus Williams	#25	Loss	4–6, 6–7^{(1–7)}
Rogers Cup; Montreal, Canada; WTA Premier 5 Hard, outdoor 4–10 August 2014	-	1R	Bye			
Rogers Cup; Montreal, Canada; WTA Premier 5 Hard, outdoor 4–10 August 2014	547	2R	(France) Alizé Cornet	#22	Win	6–4, 2–6, 6–4
Rogers Cup; Montreal, Canada; WTA Premier 5 Hard, outdoor 4–10 August 2014	548	3R	(United Kingdom) Heather Watson	#57	Win	6–2, 6–4
Rogers Cup; Montreal, Canada; WTA Premier 5 Hard, outdoor 4–10 August 2014	549	QF	(Poland) Agnieszka Radwańska	#5	Loss	2–6, 2–6
Western & Southern Open; Cincinnati, United States of America; WTA Premier 5 Hard, outdoor 11–17 August 2014	Withdrew					
US Open; New York City, United States of America; Grand Slam; Hard, outdoor 15 August–8 September 2014	550	1R	(Japan) Misaki Doi	#91	Win	6–7^{(3–7)}, 6–4, 6–1
US Open; New York City, United States of America; Grand Slam; Hard, outdoor 15 August–8 September 2014	551	2R	(United States) Christina McHale	#44	Win	6–3, 6–2
US Open; New York City, United States of America; Grand Slam; Hard, outdoor 15 August–8 September 2014	552	3R	(Russia) Elena Vesnina	#56	Win	6–1, 6–1
US Open; New York City, United States of America; Grand Slam; Hard, outdoor 15 August–8 September 2014	553	4R	(Serbia) Aleksandra Krunić	#145	Win	4–6, 6–4, 6–4
US Open; New York City, United States of America; Grand Slam; Hard, outdoor 15 August–8 September 2014	554	QF	(Russia) Ekaterina Makarova	#18	Loss	4–6, 2–6
Toray Pan Pacific Open; Tokyo, Japan; WTA Premier; Hard, outdoor 15 – 21 September 2014	555	1R	(Japan) Kimiko Date-Krumm	#86	Win	3–6, 6–0, 6–2
Toray Pan Pacific Open; Tokyo, Japan; WTA Premier; Hard, outdoor 15 – 21 September 2014	556	2R	(Serbia) Ana Ivanovic	#10	Loss	4–6, 3–6

== Tournament schedule ==
=== Singles schedule ===
Victoria Azarenka's 2014 singles tournament schedule is as follows:

Date	Championship	Location	Category	Surface	2013 result	2013 points	2014 points	Outcome
29 December 2013– 5 January 2014	Brisbane International	(Australia) Brisbane	WTA Premier	Hard	SF	200	305	Final; Lost to Serena Williams 4–6, 5–7
14 January 2014– 27 January 2014	Australian Open	(Australia) Melbourne	Grand Slam	Hard	W	2000	430	Quarter-finals; Lost to Agnieszka Radwańska 1–6, 7–5, 0–6
10 February 2014– 16 February 2014	Qatar Open	(Qatar) Doha	WTA Premier 5	Hard	W	900	0	Withdrew due to left foot injury
3 March 2014– 16 March 2014	Indian Wells Masters	(United States) Indian Wells	WTA Premier Mandatory	Hard	QF	250	10	Second round Lost to Lauren Davis 0–6, 6–7^{(2–7)}
17 March 2013– 30 March 2014	Miami Masters	(United States) Miami	WTA Premier Mandatory	Hard	DNP	0	0	Withdrew due to left foot injury
5 May 2014– 11 May 2014	Madrid Open	(Spain) Madrid	WTA Premier Mandatory	Clay	2R	60	0	Withdrew due to left foot injury
12 May 2014– 18 May 2014	Italian Open	(Italy) Rome	WTA Premier 5	Clay	F	700	0	Withdrew due to left foot injury
25 May 2014– 8 June 2014	French Open	(France) Paris	Grand Slam	Clay	SF	900	0	Withdrew due to left foot injury
16 June 2014– 21 June 2014	Eastbourne International	(United Kingdom) Eastbourne	WTA Premier	Grass	DNP	0	1	First round Lost to Camila Giorgi 6–4, 3–6, 5–7
23 June 2014– 6 July 2014	Wimbledon	(United Kingdom) London	Grand Slam	Grass	2R	100	70	Second round Lost to Bojana Jovanovski 3–6, 6–3, 5–7
28 July 2014– 3 August 2014	Stanford Classic	(United States) Stanford	WTA Premier	Hard	DNP	0	1	Second round Lost to Venus Williams 4–6, 6–7^{(1–7)}
4 August 2014– 10 August 2014	Canadian Open	(Canada) Toronto	WTA Premier 5	Hard	DNP	0	190	Quarter-finals; Lost to Agnieszka Radwańska 2–6, 2–6
11 August 2014– 17 August 2014	Cincinnati Masters	(United States) Cincinnati	WTA Premier 5	Hard	W	900	0	Withdrew due to right knee injury
25 August 2014– 8 September 2014	US Open	(United States) New York	Grand Slam	Hard	F	1400	430	Quarter-finals; Lost to Ekaterina Makarova 4–6, 2–6
15 September 2014– 21 September 2014	Pan Pacific Open	(Japan) Tokyo	WTA Premier	Hard	2R	60	TBD	Second round Lost to Ana Ivanovic 3–6, 4–6
21 September 2014– 27 September 2014	Wuhan Open	(China) Wuhan	WTA Premier 5	Hard	2R	0	0	Withdrew due to knee and foot injury
27 September 2014– 5 October 2014	China Open	(China) Beijing	WTA Premier Mandatory	Hard	1R	5	0	Withdrew due to knee and foot injury
Total year-end points						8046	1813	▼6233 difference

== Yearly Records ==
=== Head-to-head match-ups ===
Bold indicates that the player was in the Top 10, italics denotes that the player was in the Top 20 (at the time of the match being played). This list is ordered by number of wins to number of losses in chronological order played.

- (Australia) Casey Dellacqua 1–0
- (Switzerland) Stefanie Vögele 1–0
- (Serbia) **Jelena Janković** 1–0
- (Sweden) Johanna Larsson 1–0
- (Czech Republic) Barbora Záhlavová-Strýcová 1–0
- (Austria) Yvonne Meusburger 1–0
- (United States) Sloane Stephens 1–0
- (Croatia) Mirjana Lučić-Baroni 1–0
- (France) Alizé Cornet 1–0
- (United Kingdom) Heather Watson 1–0
- (Japan) Misaki Doi 1–0
- (United States) Christina McHale 1–0
- (Russia) Elena Vesnina 1–0
- (Serbia) Aleksandra Krunić 1–0
- (Japan) Kimiko Date-Krumm 1–0
- (United States) Lauren Davis 0–1
- (Italy) Camila Giorgi 0–1
- (Serbia) **Ana Ivanovic** 0–1
- (Serbia) Bojana Jovanovski 0–1
- (Russia) Ekaterina Makarova 0–1
- (United States) Venus Williams 0–1
- (United States) **Serena Williams** 0–1
- (Poland) **Agnieszka Radwańska** 0–2

=== Finals ===
==== Singles: 1 (0–1) ====
Category Grand Slam (0–0) WTA Tour Championships (0–0) WTA Premier Mandatory (0–0) WTA Premier 5 (0–0) WTA Premier (0–1)	Titles by surface Hard (0–1) Clay (0–0) Grass (0–0)	Titles by conditions Outdoors (0–1) Indoors (0–0)

Outcome	No.	Date	Championship	Surface	Opponent in the final	Score in the final
Runner-up	1.	January 4, 2014	Brisbane International, Australia	Hard	(United States) Serena Williams	4–6, 5–7

=== Earnings ===
#	Event	Prize money	Year-to-date
1	Brisbane International	$104,890	$104,890
2	Australian Open	$239,365	$344,255
3	BNP Paribas Open	$16,000	$360,255
4	Aegon International	$4,740	$364,995
5	Wimbledon	$67,015	$432,010
6	Bank of the West Classic	$10,000	$442,010
7	Rogers Cup	$51,130	$493,140
8	US Open	$364,443	$857,583
			$857,583

Figures in United States dollars (USD) unless noted.

== See also ==
- 2014 Li Na tennis season
- 2014 Maria Sharapova tennis season
- 2014 Serena Williams tennis season
- 2014 WTA Tour
