= 2014 Li Na tennis season =

- Li at the 2014 Miami Masters
- Full name: Li Na
- Country: China
- Calendar prize money: $3,409,885

Singles
- Season record: 28–7 (80%)
- Calendar titles: 2
- Current ranking: No. 6
- Ranking change from previous year: ▼3

Grand Slam & significant results
- Australian Open: W
- French Open: 1R
- Wimbledon: 3R
- US Open: A

Grand Slam mixed doubles results
- Injuries: Knee injury (US Open Series)
- Last updated on: 8 September 2014.

The 2014 Li Na tennis season officially began on 30 December with the start of the 2014 WTA Tour as the defending champion of the 2014 Shenzhen Open. In July, Li ended her nearly 2 year collaboration with coach Carlos Rodríguez. Li announced her retirement from professional tennis on 19 September citing recurring and worsening knee injuries. Li also made the longest winning streak in 2014 WTA Tour with 13.

== Yearly summary ==
=== Early hard court season and Australian Open ===
==== Shenzhen Open ====
Li Na started her season as the defending champion at the 2014 Shenzhen Open. She defeated former world number two and wildcard Vera Zvonareva and Nadiia Kichenok in the first two rounds, before being challenged by Monica Niculescu in the quarterfinals, winning in three tight sets. She then defeated rising German Annika Beck in the semifinals to reach the final for the second consecutive year, where she defeated compatriot Peng Shuai in straight sets, marking the first successful title defense of her career.

==== Australian Open ====
Instead of more preparation in Sydney, Li chose to compete at the Australian Open directly this year, at which she had been a finalist twice in the last three years. Intent on going one better, Li routed current junior top 2 players Ana Konjuh and Belinda Bencic in the first two rounds. After quickly losing an error strewn first set against Lucie Šafářová, she fended off a match point when trailing 5–6 in the second before rebounding in the tiebreak and decisive set to avoid the upset. She finished the match with 17 winners to 50 unforced errors. In her fourth round encounter with Ekaterina Makarova, Li delivered the third bagel in the tournament, easing through with a straight set victory. Li followed this up with another dominant performance against first-time Australian Open quarterfinalist Flavia Pennetta to set up a clash with teenager Eugenie Bouchard in the last four. Li easily won the first set having won 20 of the first 23 points to lead 5–0. Down 0–2 in the second set, she reeled off six of the next eight games to close out the Canadian. She reached the final for the third time, where she faced maiden Grand Slam finalist Dominika Cibulková. After winning the first set in a tiebreak, Li stormed through the second set at love to claim her second Grand Slam title, thus becoming the first Asian Australian Open champion and sixth woman to win the title after being match point down.

Her post-match speech became one of the most talked-about moments in the event. Because of her limited English, she jokingly remarked that her agent should "make [her] rich" and her husband is "lucky" to find her before thanking the crowd and everyone involved.

=== Middle East series ===
==== Qatar Open ====
Since Li missed out on last year edition's of the Qatar Open due to injury, she had no points to defend. She won her second round match against Magdaléna Rybáriková before being upset by qualifier and world No. 134 Petra Cetkovská in three sets, her first loss of the season. However, she reached a new career-high of world No. 2 after the tournament as a result of defending champion and current world No. 2 Victoria Azarenka's withdrawal.

=== North American hard court season ===
==== Indian Wells Masters ====
After missing Indian Wells in 2013, Li was the first seed this year in the absence of Serena Williams, the first time she was seeded first at a Premier Mandatory event. She enjoyed a first round bye before dispatching compatriot Zheng Jie, Karolína Plíšková and Aleksandra Wozniak in convincing fashion. In the quarterfinals she faced her first top 20 opponent of the season in Dominika Cibulková, a rematch of the Australian Open final. After Li took the opening set comfortably, Cibulková quickly built a 5–1 lead in the second due a plethora of unforced errors off Li's racquet. Li managed to recover three games but was unable to salvage the set. After the pair traded breaks early in the third, Cibulková held double break point with Li serving at 3-all. From there Li won 12 of the next 16 points to clinch the final three games and the victory after 2 hours and 36 minutes of play, maintaining her perfect record against the Slovak. With this win, Li advanced to her first Indian Wells semifinal since 2007. Facing 20th seed Flavia Pennetta in the semifinal, she was defeated in straight sets.

==== Miami Masters ====
Li received a bye in the first round of Miami Masters. In the second round she was bound to face Alisa Kleybanova, however the Russian withdrew shortly prior to the match due to a viral illness. In her third round encounter with Madison Keys, she erased two set points in the first set before forcing a tiebreak, which she won. In the second set she won five consecutive games from 0–2 down and eventually took the match handily. She then had an easy win against the 15th seed Carla Suárez Navarro, setting up a quarterfinal with Caroline Wozniacki. After Li burst out to a 4–1 lead in the first set, Wozniacki won four games in a row to go up 5–4, before Li fired back with three games of her own to take the set. The Dane was up 5–3 in the second set before Li reeled off four consecutive games to advance. In the semifinal, she met Dominika Cibulková for the third time this year. Li blew two set points when serving for the first set on her first attempt at 5–3, but successfully closed it out on her second. From 2–all in the second set, Li lost 6 games in a row to lose the set and fall behind 0–2 in the decider, before upping her game to seize six of the last seven games to seal the win, securing a place in her maiden Premier Mandatory final, where she was defeated by world No. 1 Serena Williams in straight sets despite having a set point in the first set.

=== Clay court season ===
==== Stuttgart Open ====
Li withdrew from this year edition of Stuttgart Open before the tournament.

==== Madrid Open ====
Li started her clay season at the Madrid Open, where she lost to Madison Keys in the first round last year. She defeated Kirsten Flipkens and countrywoman Zheng Jie in the first two rounds without much trouble. In the third round match against Sloane Stephens, Li surrendered the first set but regained form to earn a place in the quarter-final. She was defeated by eventual champion Maria Sharapova in three sets, after winning the first set comfortably.

==== Italian Open ====
At the Italian Open where she was sent home by former world No.1 Jelena Janković last year, Li received a bye for first round and defeated Australian Casey Dellacqua in the second. She then defeated Sam Stosur for the first time after 6 encounters in her career. In the quarterfinals against Sara Errani, Li suffered her first loss to the home favourite.

==== French Open ====
The former champion suffered her earliest loss at the event to Kristina Mladenovic. She was the first Grand Slam champion to lose in the opening round of the following Grand Slam since Petra Kvitová did so at the 2011 US Open.

=== Grass court season ===
==== Wimbledon ====
The only grass court event Li participated in this year was the Wimbledon Championships. She easily defeated Paula Kania and Yvonne Meusburger in the first two rounds. She then bowed out to Barbora Záhlavová-Strýcová in two tiebreak sets.

=== US Open Series ===
Li withdrew from the 2014 Rogers Cup, 2014 Western & Southern Open and 2014 US Open this year due to a knee injury, at all of which she was a defending semifinalist. She surrendered her world No. 2 ranking to Simona Halep following the Rogers Cup.

After skipping the entire US Open Series due to a left knee injury, Li officially announced her retirement from the sport on 19 September 2014, also withdrawing from the tournaments in Wuhan (her hometown) and Beijing. She was ranked no.6 by the Women's Tennis Association at the time of her retirement.

== All matches ==
=== Singles matches ===
Tournament	Match #	Round	Opponent	Rank	Result	Score
Shenzhen Open; Shenzhen, China; WTA International; Hard, outdoor 30 December 2013 – 4 January 2014	1	1R	(Russia) Vera Zvonareva	N/A	Win	7–5, 6–3
Shenzhen Open; Shenzhen, China; WTA International; Hard, outdoor 30 December 2013 – 4 January 2014	2	2R	(Ukraine) Nadiia Kichenok	#101	Win	6–1, 6–4
Shenzhen Open; Shenzhen, China; WTA International; Hard, outdoor 30 December 2013 – 4 January 2014	3	QF	(Romania) Monica Niculescu	#59	Win	7–5, 4–6, 6–4
Shenzhen Open; Shenzhen, China; WTA International; Hard, outdoor 30 December 2013 – 4 January 2014	4	SF	(Germany) Annika Beck	#58	Win	6–1, 6–3
Shenzhen Open; Shenzhen, China; WTA International; Hard, outdoor 30 December 2013 – 4 January 2014	5	F	(China) Peng Shuai	#42	Win (1)	6–4, 7–5
Australian Open; Melbourne, Australia; Grand Slam; Hard, outdoor 13–26 January 2014	6	1R	(Croatia) Ana Konjuh	#241	Win	6–2, 6–0
Australian Open; Melbourne, Australia; Grand Slam; Hard, outdoor 13–26 January 2014	7	2R	(Switzerland) Belinda Bencic	#187	Win	6–0, 7–6^{(7–5)}
Australian Open; Melbourne, Australia; Grand Slam; Hard, outdoor 13–26 January 2014	8	3R	(Czech Republic) Lucie Šafářová	#26	Win	1–6, 7–6^{(7–2)}, 6–3
Australian Open; Melbourne, Australia; Grand Slam; Hard, outdoor 13–26 January 2014	9	4R	(Russia) Ekaterina Makarova	#22	Win	6–2, 6–0
Australian Open; Melbourne, Australia; Grand Slam; Hard, outdoor 13–26 January 2014	10	QF	(Italy) Flavia Pennetta	#29	Win	6–2, 6–2
Australian Open; Melbourne, Australia; Grand Slam; Hard, outdoor 13–26 January 2014	11	SF	(Canada) Eugenie Bouchard	#31	Win	6–2, 6–4
Australian Open; Melbourne, Australia; Grand Slam; Hard, outdoor 13–26 January 2014	12	F	(Slovakia) Dominika Cibulková	#24	Win (2)	7–6^{(7–3)}, 6–0
Qatar Ladies Open; Doha, Qatar; WTA Premier 5 Hard, outdoor 10–16 February 2014	–	1R	Bye			
Qatar Ladies Open; Doha, Qatar; WTA Premier 5 Hard, outdoor 10–16 February 2014	13	2R	(Slovakia) Magdaléna Rybáriková	#32	Win	6–1, 5–7, 6–2
Qatar Ladies Open; Doha, Qatar; WTA Premier 5 Hard, outdoor 10–16 February 2014	14	3R	(Czech Republic) Petra Cetkovská	#134	Loss	6–7^{(2–7)}, 6–2, 4–6
BNP Paribas Open; Indian Wells, United States; WTA Premier Mandatory; Hard, outdoor 3–16 March 2014	–	1R	Bye			
BNP Paribas Open; Indian Wells, United States; WTA Premier Mandatory; Hard, outdoor 3–16 March 2014	15	2R	(China) Zheng Jie	#58	Win	6–1, 7–5
BNP Paribas Open; Indian Wells, United States; WTA Premier Mandatory; Hard, outdoor 3–16 March 2014	16	3R	(Czech Republic) Karolína Plíšková	#67	Win	6–3, 6–4
BNP Paribas Open; Indian Wells, United States; WTA Premier Mandatory; Hard, outdoor 3–16 March 2014	17	4R	(Canada) Aleksandra Wozniak	#241	Win	6–1, 6–4
BNP Paribas Open; Indian Wells, United States; WTA Premier Mandatory; Hard, outdoor 3–16 March 2014	18	QF	(Slovakia) Dominika Cibulková	#11	Win	6–3, 4–6, 6–3
BNP Paribas Open; Indian Wells, United States; WTA Premier Mandatory; Hard, outdoor 3–16 March 2014	19	SF	(Italy) Flavia Pennetta	#21	Loss	6–7^{(5–7)}, 3–6
Sony Open Tennis; Miami, United States; WTA Premier Mandatory; Hard, outdoor 17–30 March 2014	–	1R	Bye			
Sony Open Tennis; Miami, United States; WTA Premier Mandatory; Hard, outdoor 17–30 March 2014	–	2R	(Russia) Alisa Kleybanova	#112	Walkover	N/A
Sony Open Tennis; Miami, United States; WTA Premier Mandatory; Hard, outdoor 17–30 March 2014	20	3R	(United States) Madison Keys	#38	Win	7–6^{(7–3)}, 6–3
Sony Open Tennis; Miami, United States; WTA Premier Mandatory; Hard, outdoor 17–30 March 2014	21	4R	(Spain) Carla Suárez Navarro	#17	Win	6–0, 6–2
Sony Open Tennis; Miami, United States; WTA Premier Mandatory; Hard, outdoor 17–30 March 2014	22	QF	(Denmark) Caroline Wozniacki	#18	Win	7–5, 7–5
Sony Open Tennis; Miami, United States; WTA Premier Mandatory; Hard, outdoor 17–30 March 2014	23	SF	(Slovakia) Dominika Cibulková	#11	Win	7–5, 2–6, 6–3
Sony Open Tennis; Miami, United States; WTA Premier Mandatory; Hard, outdoor 17–30 March 2014	24	F	(United States) Serena Williams	#1	Loss	5–7, 1–6
Porsche Tennis Grand Prix; Stuttgart, Germany; WTA Premier; Clay, indoor 21–27 April 2014	Withdrew					
Mutua Madrid Open; Madrid, Spain; WTA Premier Mandatory; Clay, outdoor 3–11 May 2014	25	1R	(Belgium) Kirsten Flipkens	#23	Win	6–1, 7–6^{(9–7)}
Mutua Madrid Open; Madrid, Spain; WTA Premier Mandatory; Clay, outdoor 3–11 May 2014	26	2R	(China) Zheng Jie	#60	Win	6–2, 6–3
Mutua Madrid Open; Madrid, Spain; WTA Premier Mandatory; Clay, outdoor 3–11 May 2014	27	3R	(United States) Sloane Stephens	#17	Win	2–6, 6–3, 6–2
Mutua Madrid Open; Madrid, Spain; WTA Premier Mandatory; Clay, outdoor 3–11 May 2014	28	QF	(Russia) Maria Sharapova	#9	Loss	6–2, 6–7^{(5–7)}, 3–6
Internazionali BNL d'Italia; Rome, Italy; WTA Premier 5 Clay, outdoor 12–18 May 2014	–	1R	Bye			
Internazionali BNL d'Italia; Rome, Italy; WTA Premier 5 Clay, outdoor 12–18 May 2014	29	2R	(Australia) Casey Dellacqua	#53	Win	6–1, 6–4
Internazionali BNL d'Italia; Rome, Italy; WTA Premier 5 Clay, outdoor 12–18 May 2014	30	3R	(Australia) Samantha Stosur	#18	Win	6–3, 6–1
Internazionali BNL d'Italia; Rome, Italy; WTA Premier 5 Clay, outdoor 12–18 May 2014	31	QF	(Italy) Sara Errani	#11	Loss	3–6, 6–4, 2–6
French Open; Paris, France; Grand Slam; Clay, outdoor 25 May – 8 June 2014	32	1R	(France) Kristina Mladenovic	#104	Loss	5–7, 6–3, 1–6
Wimbledon; London, United Kingdom; Grand Slam; Grass, outdoor 23 June – 7 July 2014	33	1R	(Poland) Paula Kania	#175	Win	7–5, 6–2
Wimbledon; London, United Kingdom; Grand Slam; Grass, outdoor 23 June – 7 July 2014	34	2R	(Austria) Yvonne Meusburger	#38	Win	6–2, 6–2
Wimbledon; London, United Kingdom; Grand Slam; Grass, outdoor 23 June – 7 July 2014	35	3R	(Czech Republic) Barbora Záhlavová-Strýcová	#43	Loss	6–7^{(5–7)}, 6–7^{(5–7)}

== Tournament Schedule ==
=== Singles schedule ===
Li's 2014 singles tournament schedule is as follows:

Date	Championship	Location	Category	Surface	Prev. result	Prev. points	New points	Outcome
30 December 2013– 4 January 2014	Shenzhen Open	Shenzhen (CHN)	WTA International	Hard	W	280	280	Winner defeated Peng Shuai, 6–4, 7–5
13 January 2014– 26 January 2014	Australian Open	Melbourne (AUS)	Grand Slam	Hard	F	1400	2000	Winner defeated Dominika Cibulková, 7–6^{(7–3)}, 6–0
10 February 2014– 16 February 2014	Qatar Total Open	Doha (QAT)	WTA Premier 5	Hard	DNP	0	105	Third round lost to Petra Cetkovská, 6–7^{(2–7)}, 6–2, 4–6
3 March 2014– 16 March 2014	BNP Paribas Open	Indian Wells (USA)	WTA Premier Mandatory	Hard	DNP	0	390	Semifinals lost to Flavia Pennetta, 6–7^{(5–7)}, 3–6
17 March 2014– 30 March 2014	Sony Open Tennis	Miami (USA)	WTA Premier Mandatory	Hard	QF	250	650	Final lost to Serena Williams, 5–7, 1–6
21 April 2014– 27 April 2014	Porsche Tennis Grand Prix	Stuttgart (GER)	WTA Premier	Clay (i)	F	320	0	Withdrew
3 May 2014– 11 May 2014	Mutua Madrid Open	Madrid (ESP)	WTA Premier Mandatory	Clay	1R	5	215	Quarterfinals lost to Maria Sharapova, 6–2, 6–7^{(5–7)}, 3–6
12 May 2014– 18 May 2014	Internazionali BNL d'Italia	Rome (ITA)	WTA Premier 5	Clay	3R	125	190	Quarterfinals lost to Sara Errani, 3–6, 6–4, 2–6
25 May 2014– 8 June 2014	French Open	Paris (FRA)	Grand Slam	Clay	2R	100	10	First round lost to Kristina Mladenovic, 5–7, 6–3, 1–6
16 June 2014– 21 June 2014	Aegon International	Eastbourne (GBR)	WTA Premier	Grass	QF	120	0	Did Not Participate
23 June 2014– 6 July 2014	Wimbledon	London (GBR)	Grand Slam	Grass	QF	500	130	Third round lost to Barbora Záhlavová-Strýcová, 6–7^{(5–7)}, 6–7^{(5–7)}
Total year-end points							3970	

== Yearly records ==
=== Head-to-head matchups ===
Bold indicates that the player was in the Top 10, italics denotes that the player was in the Top 20 (at the time of the match being played). This list is ordered by number of wins to number of losses in chronological order played.

- (Slovakia) Dominika Cibulková 3–0
- (China) Zheng Jie 2–0
- (Russia) Vera Zvonareva 1–0
- (Ukraine) Nadiia Kichenok 1–0
- (Romania) Monica Niculescu 1–0
- (Germany) Annika Beck 1–0
- (China) Peng Shuai 1–0
- (Croatia) Ana Konjuh 1–0
- (Switzerland) Belinda Bencic 1–0
- (Czech Republic) Lucie Šafářová 1–0
- (Russia) Ekaterina Makarova 1–0
- (Canada) Eugenie Bouchard 1–0
- (Slovakia) Magdaléna Rybáriková 1–0
- (Czech Republic) Karolína Plíšková 1–0
- (Canada) Aleksandra Wozniak 1–0
- (United States) Madison Keys 1–0
- (Spain) Carla Suárez Navarro 1–0
- (Denmark) Caroline Wozniacki 1–0
- (Belgium) Kirsten Flipkens 1–0
- (United States) Sloane Stephens 1–0
- (Australia) Casey Dellacqua 1–0
- (Australia) Samantha Stosur 1–0
- (Poland) Paula Kania 1–0
- (Austria) Yvonne Meusburger 1–0
- (Italy) Flavia Pennetta 1–1
- (Czech Republic) Petra Cetkovská 0–1
- (United States) **Serena Williams** 0–1
- (Russia) **Maria Sharapova** 0–1
- (Italy) Sara Errani 0–1
- (France) Kristina Mladenovic 0–1
- (Czech Republic) Barbora Záhlavová-Strýcová 0–1

=== Finals ===
==== Singles: 3 (2–1) ====
Legend Grand Slams (1–0) WTA Tour Championships (0–0) WTA Premier Mandatory (0–1) WTA Premier 5 (0–0) WTA Premier (0–0) WTA International (1–0)	Finals by surface Hard (2–1) Clay (0–0)	Finals by venue Outdoors (2–1) Indoors (0–0)

Outcome	No.	Date	Championship	Surface	Opponent in the final	Score in the final
Winner	8.	January 4, 2014	Shenzhen Open, China	Hard	(China) Peng Shuai	6–4, 7–5
Winner	9.	25 January 2014	Australian Open, Australia	Hard	(Slovakia) Dominika Cibulková	7–6^{(7–3)}, 6–0
Runner-up	12.	29 March 2014	Sony Open Tennis, United States	Hard	(United States) Serena Williams	5–7, 1–6

=== Earnings ===
#	Event	Prize money	Year-to-date
1	**Shenzhen Open**	$111,163	$111,163
2	**Australian Open**	$2,349,322	$2,460,485
3	Qatar Total Open	$25,135	$2,485,620
4	BNP Paribas Open	$225,000	$2,710,620
5	Sony Open Tennis	$384,065	$3,094,685
6	Mutua Madrid Open	$117,719	$3,212,404
7	Internazionali BNL d'Italia	$55,180	$3,267,584
8	French Open	$31,634	$3,299,218
9	Wimbledon	$110,667	$3,409,885
			$3,409,885

Figures in United States dollars (USD) unless noted.

== See also ==
- 2014 Maria Sharapova tennis season
- 2014 Victoria Azarenka tennis season
- 2014 Serena Williams tennis season
- 2014 WTA Tour
