= 2014 Maria Sharapova tennis season =

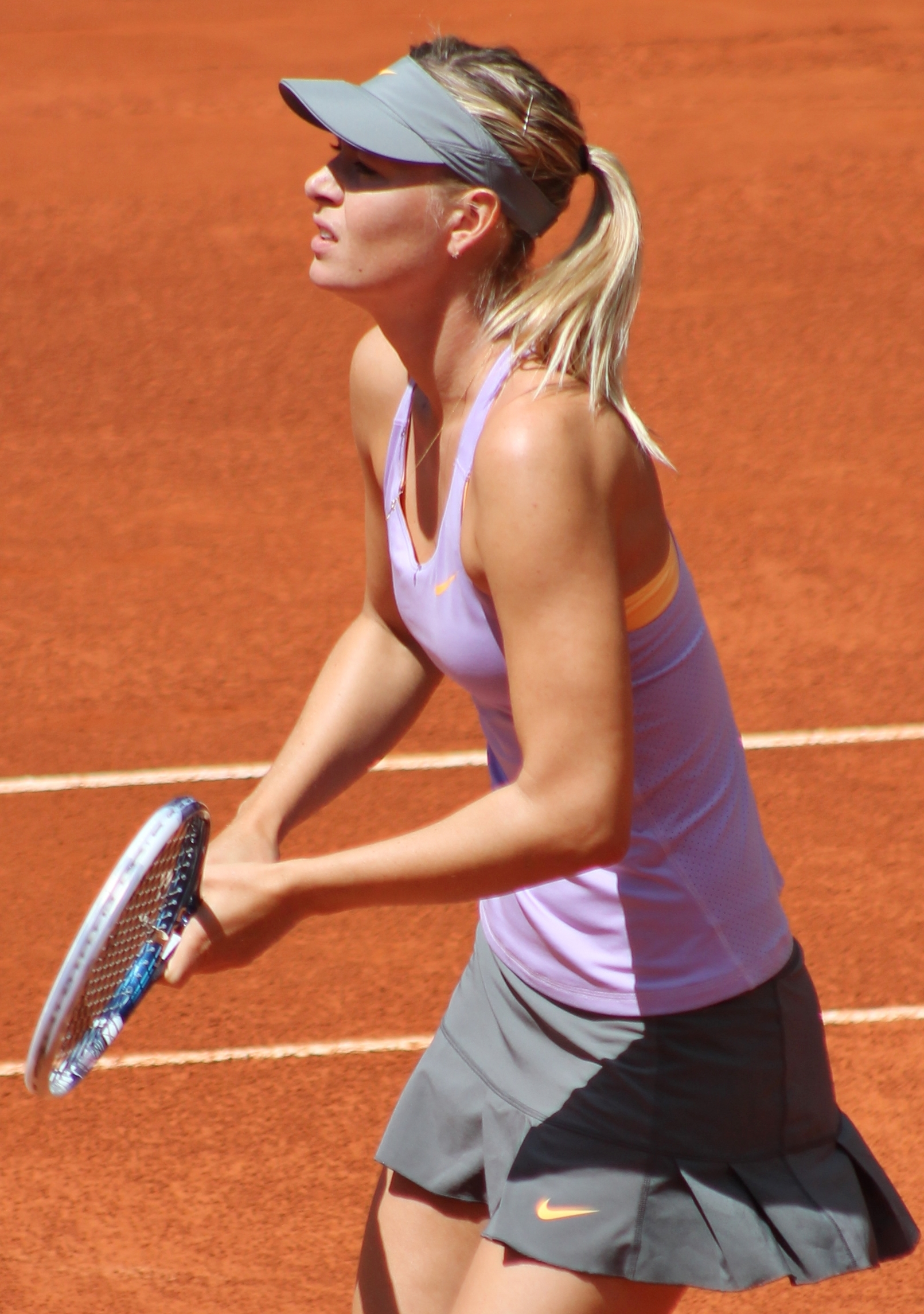
- Sharapova at the 2014 Madrid Mutua Open.
- Full name: Maria Sharapova
- Country: Russia
- Calendar prize money: $5,156,357

Singles
- Season record: 48–13 (78.69%)
- Calendar titles: 4
- Year-end ranking: No. 2
- Ranking change from previous year: ▲2

Grand Slam & significant results
- Australian Open: 4R
- French Open: W
- Wimbledon: 4R
- US Open: 4R
- Last updated on: 7 October 2014.

The 2014 Maria Sharapova tennis season officially began on 30 December 2013 with the start of the 2014 WTA Tour. Sharapova began the season, having only played one match since the previous June due to a shoulder injury, at the Brisbane International. After failing to defend her points during the winter and spring hard court season, Sharapova almost dropped out of the Top 10. She rebounded by dominating the clay court season which saw her win Stuttgart, Madrid and the French Open. Her only loss on clay came to a resurgent Ana Ivanovic. She then won her first hard court title since the 2013 BNP Paribas Open at the China Open. Her season ended on 24 October 2014 following her elimination from the round robin stage at the 2014 WTA Finals in Singapore. She ended the year ranked no. 2 behind Serena Williams.

== Year in detail ==
=== Early hard court season and Australian Open ===
==== Brisbane International ====
Sharapova began her season at the Brisbane International, having pulled out of the event in the previous two seasons. Her comeback began with a straightforward 6–3, 6–0 win over Caroline Garcia. She then received a walkover before her second round match with home favourite Ashleigh Barty, with Barty citing a left adductor tear as reason for her withdrawal. In the quarterfinals, Sharapova played world #30 Kaia Kanepi and prevailed in three sets, having lost the opener to the Estonian. Sharapova's run ended in the semifinals with a 6–2, 7–6 (7) defeat to world #1 Serena Williams. The defeat was Sharapova's fourteenth consecutive defeat to Williams, a run stretching back to 2004. Despite the defeat, Sharapova's world ranking climbed slightly to world #3, overtaking Li Na.

==== Australian Open ====
Sharapova's next tournament was the first major of the year, the Australian Open, an event she had previously won in 2008. She was seeded third and was defending heavy points from the previous years semifinal, which she lost in straight sets to Li Na. Sharapova began her title bid against American Bethanie Mattek-Sands and prevailed 6–3, 6–4. She then faced Italian Karin Knapp in the second round and ultimately won 6–4, 4–6, 10–8, in a match that lasted for almost three and a half hours. Following the match, the tournament was criticized from some quarters, for allowing the match to continue under the closed roof on Rod Laver Arena, despite play being stopped on all other courts due to the tournaments Extreme Heat policy. Sharapova later played down the complaints stating "I think you just get numb to [the heat], it just doesn't faze you any more. I'm happy – these are the matches that you work for." Next, Sharapova had a much easier time in the third round, defeating French 25th seed Alizé Cornet in straight sets 6–1, 7–6. Her run however came to an end in the fourth round, when she lost in three sets to the Slovak 20th seed (and eventual finalist) Dominika Cibulková. Sharapova had won the first set 6–3, but then lost the next two sets to be eliminated from the competition. Sharapova's ranking fell two places to world #5 after the tournament.

==== Paris Open GDF Suez ====
Following defeat at the Australian Open, Sharapova entered the Premier level Open GDF Suez in Paris as the top seed. Her confectionery venture Sugarpova was one of the tournaments primary sponsors. She began the event with a straightforward 6–0, 6–1 victory over world #31 Daniela Hantuchová, her ninth consecutive win over the Slovak after losing their opening meeting in 2004. She then progressed through the quarterfinals with a 6–2, 6–2 win over Kirsten Flipkens, before losing to compatriot and eventual champion Anastasia Pavlyuchenkova in the semifinal match. Sharapova had again won the first set, before Pavlyuchenkova came back to win in three, to claim her first career victory over Sharapova. Sharapova's ranking remained steady at world #5 after the event.

==== BNP Paribas Open ====
After not playing during the month of February, Sharapova returned to action at the BNP Paribas Open in Indian Wells, California. She was the defending champion at the event, having beaten Caroline Wozniacki 6–2, 6–2 in the 2013 final. As the fourth seed, Sharapova received a bye in the first round and thus began her title defence in the second round, facing German world #86 Julia Görges. Sharapova made short work of her opponent, winning 6–1, 6–4. In the third round, Sharapova faced 22-year-old qualifier Camila Giorgi for the first time in her career. Despite being the heavy favourite to progress, Sharapova was stunned by Giorgi in three sets, losing the defence of her title 3–6, 6–4, 5–7. The early defeat proved costly for Sharapova's ranking, which dropped two further places to world #7 after the event.

==== 2014 Sony Open Tennis ====
After her early loss at Indian Wells, Sharapova looked to bounce back at the Sony Open Tennis event in Key Biscayne, Florida. Sharapova entered the tournament having been the beaten finalist on five previous occasions, including the last three editions of the competition, losing against Victoria Azarenka, Agnieszka Radwańska and Serena Williams respectively. Despite her ranking having dropped to #7, she entered the tournament as the fourth seed and again received a bye to the second round. There, Sharapova played her first career meeting with Japan's Kurumi Nara and won in straight sets 6–3, 6–4, to set up a third round match against world #26 Lucie Šafářová. Though Sharapova failed to convert two match points in the second set (and eight overall), she eventually overcame her Czech opponent on her ninth match point, winning 6–4, 6–7, 6–2 to advance to the fourth round. She next faced Kirsten Flipkens, and despite never previously losing a set to her opponent (including at their previous 2014 meeting in Paris), she lost the first set 3–6. However, Sharapova then regrouped and won the following two sets 6–4, 6–1 to advance the quarterfinals. There, Sharapova earned her first top ten victory of the year, seeing off world #8 Petra Kvitová 7–5, 6–1, to set up a semifinal rematch against Serena Williams. However, despite making a strong start, Sharapova once again fell foul of the world #1, losing 6–4, 6–3. The defeat was Sharapova's third semifinal loss of 2014, each to the eventual winner of the tournament. Sharapova again dropped slightly in the rankings to world #9, her lowest position since returning to the top 10 in 2011.

=== Spring clay court season and French Open ===
==== Porsche Tennis Grand Prix ====
Sharapova began her clay court season at the Porsche Tennis Grand Prix in Stuttgart, Germany. She entered the tournament having never previously lost at the event, and as the two-time defending champion following her victories over Victoria Azarenka and Li Na in the 2012 and 2013 finals respectively. Seeded sixth, Sharapova began her campaign facing Lucie Šafářová for the second time in 2014, and their match proved just as dramatic as their previous encounter in Key Biscayne, with Sharapova ultimately prevailing in three hours and twenty four minutes, 7–6, 6–7, 7–6, having previously being two points from defeat in the final set. The second round proved to be far more straightforward for Sharapova, as she beat Anastasia Pavlyuchenkova 6–4, 6–3 to avenge her earlier defeat to the Russian in Paris. In the subsequent quarterfinals, Sharapova beat top seed and world #3 Agnieszka Radwańska in straight sets, and then advanced to her third consecutive Stuttgart final by comfortably beating Sara Errani 6–1, 6–2 in the semifinals, setting up a title decider with world #12 Ana Ivanovic. The match was the first final to be contested between the pair since the 2008 Australian Open, won by Sharapova. Ivanovic started the final strong, winning the first set 6–3 and taking a 3–1 lead in the second, however Sharapova then recovered, winning 11 of the remaining 13 games to claim her third consecutive title at Stuttgart with a 3–6, 6–4, 6–1 win. The victory secured Sharapova's first title of the year, and the first since her previous visit to the event. Stuttgart is the first title that Sharapova has ever won on three occasions in her career.

==== Mutua Madrid Open ====
Next, Sharapova traveled to Spain, for the Mutua Madrid Open, a Premier Mandatory event. She entered the tournament as the eighth seed, defending finalist points after her defeat to Serena Williams in the 2013 title decider. Following a comfortable first round victory over Klára Koukalová, Sharapova was forced to rally from a 1–4 deficit in the final set against Christina McHale in the second round, eventually prevailing 6–1, 4–6, 6–4. In the third round, Sharapova continued her dominance over Australian Samantha Stosur, earning a 6–4, 6–3 victory, her twelfth over Stosur in fourteen career meetings. Sharapova was once again involved in a narrow three setter in her quarterfinal match, beating world #2 Li Na 2–6, 7–6, 6–3. She then beat Agnieszka Radwańska 6–1, 6–4 in the semifinal, to earn a berth in the Madrid final for the second time in a row. This time she faced world #5 Simona Halep for the title, but started slowly, losing the first set 6–1. From there however, Sharapova slowly regained her dominance in the game, and eventually came out the victor, earning her first Madrid title and her second overall in 2014 with a 1–6, 6–2, 6–3 victory. Following the match, Sharapova's world ranking recovered slightly back to world #7. She remains unbeaten on clay in 2014 and is currently on an eleven match winning streak.

==== Internazionali BNL d'Italia ====
Aiming for her third consecutive title, and to keep her unbeaten clay court record alive, Sharapova went to Italy to contest in the Internazionali BNL d'Italia, a Premier 5 tournament. As she entered the tournament as the eighth seed, she had a bye in the first round. Sharapova struggled through her second round match against Monica Puig, coming back from a 2–1 deficit in the first set and a 4–1 deficit in the second to win the match 6–3, 7–5. In the third round, Sharapova faced eleventh seed Ana Ivanovic, who she defeated in Stuttgart. Despite Sharapova winning their last six meetings, she lost to Ivanovic 1–6, 4–6.

==== French Open ====
Sharapova was seeded seventh at this year French Open. She played Ksenia Pervak, Tsvetana Pironkova and Paula Ormaechea in the opening rounds, and dominated all three matches in straight sets, including a "double bagel" over Ormaechea. In round four Sharapova played Australian 19th seed Samantha Stosur. She dropped the first set and found herself 3–4 down in the second, before improving and winning all nine of the remaining games. In the quarter-final, Sharapova faced Garbiñe Muguruza who had knocked out Serena Williams in the second round. Sharapova started slowly, losing the first set 1–6 and being broken in the second set. However, she again made a late comeback and came out the 1–6, 7–5, 6–1 winner, to set up a fourth consecutive French Open semifinal. Here, she played Eugenie Bouchard, the 18th seed. For a third consecutive match, she came from a set down to win the match 4–6 7–5 6–2. In the grand final, her opponent was Romanian 4th seed, and Grand Slam final debutante, Simona Halep. In what was later described as one of the best Grand Slam finals in years, Sharapova claimed the first set 6–4, before losing the second set tiebreak to Halep. Despite struggling early in the third set, Sharapova's experience prevailed and after over three hours, she emerged victorious with a 6–4, 6–7, 6–4 win, claiming her fifth Grand Slam title, and second at the French Open. After the tournament, Sharapova's ranking improved to World #5, and she also claimed top spot in the WTA's "Road to Singapore" leaderboard. Following the early end to her 2013 season, Sharapova additionally only has 101 points to defend until the end of the year.

=== Grasscourt Season ===
==== Wimbledon ====
Sharapova was seeded fifth at this year Wimbledon, defending second round points after her shock defeat to Michelle Larcher de Brito in 2013. She quickly improved on her previous result, with quick wins over local wildcard Samantha Murray and qualifier Timea Bacsinszky. She then continued her strong start over grass-court specialist Alison Riske 6–3, 6–0 to set up a fourth round clash with world #7 Angelique Kerber to whom she lost 6–7 6–4 4–6 after saving six match points in the final set.

=== US Open Series & US Open ===
==== Rogers Cup ====
Sharapova began the 2014 US Open Series at the Rogers Cup, where she gained a top 4 seeding for the first time since the Sony Open in March, by virtue of Li Na's withdrawal from the tournament with a knee injury. Receiving a bye through the first round, Maria opened up her campaign against Garbiñe Muguruza, whom she had defeated in the quarterfinals of Roland Garros earlier in the year. Following a quick start by her opponent, which saw Sharapova fall behind a set and a break, Maria broke back in the fourth game of the second set and won eleven of the last thirteen games to win the match 4–6, 6–3, 6–1. In her third round match, Sharapova faced Muguruza's doubles partner Carla Suárez Navarro. Another slow start saw Sharapova fall into a quick 0–5 deficit in the first set and although she was able to hold and break Suárez Navarro's serve for 2–5, Carla broke to win the first set 2–6. Sharapova was twice a break down in the second set at 0–2 and 1–3 but she broke back both times and leveled the match by winning the set 6–4. The match had been littered with rain delays and the final one of the match saw Sharapova come out to another slow start in the third set, which Sharapova consequently lost 2–6. This was Maria's first loss to Suárez Navarro, tying their head-to-head at one apiece.

==== Western & Southern Open ====
Sharapova next participated at the tournament in Cincinnati, where she was previously the champion in 2011. Sharapova was seeded fifth, and advanced to the quarterfinals with wins over Madison Keys and Anastasia Pavlyuchenkova. She then earned her third win of 2014 against world #2 Simona Halep in a lengthy three set match. In the semifinals, Sharapova met Ana Ivanovic for the third time in the year. Despite coming back from a set down, Sharapova missed two match points in the final set and went on to lose 2–6, 7–5, 5–7.

==== US Open ====
Sharapova was seeded 5th at the final Grand Slam of the year. She comfortably dispatched of compatriot Maria Kirilenko in the first round, before advancing again, this time in three sets over Romanian Alexandra Dulgheru. In the third round, Sharapova defeated 26th seed Sabine Lisicki in straight sets to set up a fourth round tie against tenth seed Caroline Wozniacki, but lost there to the eventual finalist, 4–6, 6–2, 2–6.

=== Asian hard court season ===
==== Wuhan Open ====
After almost a month of inactivity, Sharapova returned to the tour at the inaugural tournament at Wuhan. As the fourth seed, she received a bye in the first round, before facing Svetlana Kuznetsova for the first time in over three years, defeating her compatriot in three sets. Her run at the tournament came to an abrupt end in the next round, when she was stunned by world #61 Timea Bacsinszky in two close sets.

==== China Open ====
Sharapova next played at the China Open in Beijing, her first return to the event since defeat at the hands of Victoria Azarenka in the 2012 final. She quickly advanced to the quarterfinals without dropping a set, defeating Kaia Kanepi, Elina Svitolina and avenging her Montreal defeat to Carla Suárez Navarro. She then defeated Svetlana Kuznetsova for the second time in two weeks, this time at the loss of only four games, to claim a semifinal berth against Ana Ivanovic. Despite enduring a lengthy final service game that contained three aces and four double faults, Sharapova emerged in straight sets 6–0, 6–4, to tie her 2014 rivalry with Ivanovic at two wins apiece. In the final, Sharapova faced world #3 Petra Kvitová. She was broken in the very first game of the match, but rebounded to claim the first set 6–4. Kvitová then upped her game to claim the second set, but Sharapova rebounded in the final set, claiming a 6–4, 2–6, 6–3 victory and her fourth tournament win of the year. The victory, her first at Beijing, was her first tournament victory on a hard court since Indian Wells in 2013, and her four titles of the year represented her best haul since winning five titles in 2006.

=== WTA Finals ===
Sharapova's final event of the year came at the 2014 WTA Finals, held in Singapore for the first time. As the second seed, she was placed in the White Group alongside Petra Kvitová, Agnieszka Radwańska and Caroline Wozniacki. Sharapova started the tournament poorly, losing in three sets to Wozniacki before being pushed to the brink of elimination after a straight sets defeat to Kvitová. In spite of losing her first two matches, Sharapova entered her final match against Radwańska still able to qualify for the semifinals, provided that she won in straight sets, while Wozniacki did the same against Kvitová. Despite taking a commanding 7–5, 5–1 lead against Radwańska, Sharapova was unable to convert three match points and ultimately lost the second set on a tiebreak, eliminating her from the tournament. She went on to win the deciding set to earn her first round-robin win, but the result wasn't enough to see her into the semifinals. In the following match, Wozniacki beat Kvitová 6–2, 6–3, meaning that Sharapova would have progressed had she won the second set. In spite of the round-robin elimination, Sharapvoa retained her ranking position, finishing 2014 ranked second behind Serena Williams.

== All matches ==
| Tournament | Match | Round | Opponent | Rank | Result | Score |
| Brisbane International; Brisbane, Australia; WTA Premier; Hard, outdoor 30 December 2013 – 5 January 2014 | 1 | 1R | (France) Caroline Garcia | #74 | Win | 6–3, 6–0 |
| Brisbane International; Brisbane, Australia; WTA Premier; Hard, outdoor 30 December 2013 – 5 January 2014 | – | 2R | (Australia) Ashleigh Barty (Q) | #190 | Walkover | N/A |
| Brisbane International; Brisbane, Australia; WTA Premier; Hard, outdoor 30 December 2013 – 5 January 2014 | 2 | QF | (Estonia) Kaia Kanepi | #30 | Win | 4–6, 6–3, 6–2 |
| Brisbane International; Brisbane, Australia; WTA Premier; Hard, outdoor 30 December 2013 – 5 January 2014 | 3 | SF | (United States) Serena Williams | #1 | Loss | 2–6, 6–7^{(7–9)} |
| Australian Open; Melbourne, Australia; Grand Slam; Hard, outdoor 13–26 January 2014 | 4 | 1R | (United States) Bethanie Mattek-Sands | #41 | Win | 6–3, 6–4 |
| Australian Open; Melbourne, Australia; Grand Slam; Hard, outdoor 13–26 January 2014 | 5 | 2R | (Italy) Karin Knapp | #44 | Win | 6–3, 4–6, 10–8 |
| Australian Open; Melbourne, Australia; Grand Slam; Hard, outdoor 13–26 January 2014 | 6 | 3R | (France) Alizé Cornet | #25 | Win | 6–1, 7–6 ^{(8–6)} |
| Australian Open; Melbourne, Australia; Grand Slam; Hard, outdoor 13–26 January 2014 | 7 | 4R | (Slovakia) Dominika Cibulková | #24 | Loss | 6–2, 4–6, 1–6 |
| Open GDF Suez; Paris, France; WTA Premier; Hard, indoor 27 January – 2 February 2014 | – | 1R | Bye | | | |
| Open GDF Suez; Paris, France; WTA Premier; Hard, indoor 27 January – 2 February 2014 | 8 | 2R | (Slovakia) Daniela Hantuchová | #31 | Win | 6–0, 6–1 |
| Open GDF Suez; Paris, France; WTA Premier; Hard, indoor 27 January – 2 February 2014 | 9 | QF | (Belgium) Kirsten Flipkens | #21 | Win | 6–2, 6–2 |
| Open GDF Suez; Paris, France; WTA Premier; Hard, indoor 27 January – 2 February 2014 | 10 | SF | (Russia) Anastasia Pavlyuchenkova | #26 | Loss | 6–4, 3–6, 4–6 |
| BNP Paribas Open; Indian Wells, United States; WTA Premier Mandatory; Hard, outdoor 3–16 March 2014 | – | 1R | Bye | | | |
| BNP Paribas Open; Indian Wells, United States; WTA Premier Mandatory; Hard, outdoor 3–16 March 2014 | 11 | 2R | (Germany) Julia Görges | #86 | Win | 6–1, 6–4 |
| BNP Paribas Open; Indian Wells, United States; WTA Premier Mandatory; Hard, outdoor 3–16 March 2014 | 12 | 3R | (Italy) Camila Giorgi (Q) | #79 | Loss | 3–6, 6–4, 5–7 |
| Sony Open Tennis; Key Biscayne, United States; WTA Premier Mandatory; Hard, outdoor 17–30 March 2014 | – | 1R | Bye | | | |
| Sony Open Tennis; Key Biscayne, United States; WTA Premier Mandatory; Hard, outdoor 17–30 March 2014 | 13 | 2R | (Japan) Kurumi Nara | #45 | Win | 6–3, 6–4 |
| Sony Open Tennis; Key Biscayne, United States; WTA Premier Mandatory; Hard, outdoor 17–30 March 2014 | 14 | 3R | (Czech Republic) Lucie Šafářová | #27 | Win | 6–4, 6–7^{(7–9)}, 6–2 |
| Sony Open Tennis; Key Biscayne, United States; WTA Premier Mandatory; Hard, outdoor 17–30 March 2014 | 15 | 4R | (Belgium) Kirsten Flipkens | #23 | Win | 3–6, 6–4, 6–1 |
| Sony Open Tennis; Key Biscayne, United States; WTA Premier Mandatory; Hard, outdoor 17–30 March 2014 | 16 | QF | (Czech Republic) Petra Kvitová | #8 | Win | 7–5, 6–1 |
| Sony Open Tennis; Key Biscayne, United States; WTA Premier Mandatory; Hard, outdoor 17–30 March 2014 | 17 | SF | (United States) Serena Williams | #1 | Loss | 4–6, 3–6 |
| Porsche Tennis Grand Prix; Stuttgart, Germany; WTA Premier; Clay (red), indoor 21–27 April 2014 | 18 | 1R | (Czech Republic) Lucie Šafářová | #26 | Win | 7–6^{(7–5)}, 6–7^{(5–7)}, 7–6^{(7–2)} |
| Porsche Tennis Grand Prix; Stuttgart, Germany; WTA Premier; Clay (red), indoor 21–27 April 2014 | 19 | 2R | (Russia) Anastasia Pavlyuchenkova | #25 | Win | 6–4, 6–3 |
| Porsche Tennis Grand Prix; Stuttgart, Germany; WTA Premier; Clay (red), indoor 21–27 April 2014 | 20 | QF | (Poland) Agnieszka Radwańska | #3 | Win | 6–4, 6–3 |
| Porsche Tennis Grand Prix; Stuttgart, Germany; WTA Premier; Clay (red), indoor 21–27 April 2014 | 21 | SF | (Italy) Sara Errani | #11 | Win | 6–1, 6–2 |
| Porsche Tennis Grand Prix; Stuttgart, Germany; WTA Premier; Clay (red), indoor 21–27 April 2014 | 22 | F | (Serbia) Ana Ivanovic | #12 | Win (1) | 3–6, 6–4, 6–1 |
| Mutua Madrid Open; Madrid, Spain; WTA Premier Mandatory; Clay, outdoor 2–11 May 2014 | 23 | 1R | (Czech Republic) Klára Koukalová | #31 | Win | 6–1, 6–2 |
| Mutua Madrid Open; Madrid, Spain; WTA Premier Mandatory; Clay, outdoor 2–11 May 2014 | 24 | 2R | (United States) Christina McHale | #56 | Win | 6–1, 4–6, 6–4 |
| Mutua Madrid Open; Madrid, Spain; WTA Premier Mandatory; Clay, outdoor 2–11 May 2014 | 25 | 3R | (Australia) Samantha Stosur | #19 | Win | 6–4, 6–3 |
| Mutua Madrid Open; Madrid, Spain; WTA Premier Mandatory; Clay, outdoor 2–11 May 2014 | 26 | QF | (China) Li Na | #2 | Win | 2–6, 7–6^{(7–5)}, 6–3 |
| Mutua Madrid Open; Madrid, Spain; WTA Premier Mandatory; Clay, outdoor 2–11 May 2014 | 27 | SF | (Poland) Agnieszka Radwańska | #3 | Win | 6–1, 6–4 |
| Mutua Madrid Open; Madrid, Spain; WTA Premier Mandatory; Clay, outdoor 2–11 May 2014 | 28 | F | (Romania) Simona Halep | #5 | Win (2) | 1–6, 6–2, 6–3 |
| Internazionali BNL d'Italia; Rome, Italy; WTA Premier Five; Clay, outdoor 12–18 May 2014 | – | 1R | Bye | | | |
| Internazionali BNL d'Italia; Rome, Italy; WTA Premier Five; Clay, outdoor 12–18 May 2014 | 29 | 2R | (Puerto Rico) Monica Puig | #60 | Win | 6–3, 7–5 |
| Internazionali BNL d'Italia; Rome, Italy; WTA Premier Five; Clay, outdoor 12–18 May 2014 | 30 | 3R | (Serbia) Ana Ivanovic | #13 | Loss | 1–6, 4–6 |
| French Open; Paris, France; Grand Slam; Clay, outdoor 25 May – 7 June 2014 | 31 | 1R | (Russia) Ksenia Pervak (Q) | #160 | Win | 6–1, 6–2 |
| French Open; Paris, France; Grand Slam; Clay, outdoor 25 May – 7 June 2014 | 32 | 2R | (Bulgaria) Tsvetana Pironkova | #42 | Win | 7–5, 6–2 |
| French Open; Paris, France; Grand Slam; Clay, outdoor 25 May – 7 June 2014 | 33 | 3R | (Argentina) Paula Ormaechea | #75 | Win | 6–0, 6–0 |
| French Open; Paris, France; Grand Slam; Clay, outdoor 25 May – 7 June 2014 | 34 | 4R | (Australia) Samantha Stosur | #18 | Win | 3–6, 6–4, 6–0 |
| French Open; Paris, France; Grand Slam; Clay, outdoor 25 May – 7 June 2014 | 35 | QF | (Spain) Garbiñe Muguruza | #35 | Win | 1–6, 7–5, 6–1 |
| French Open; Paris, France; Grand Slam; Clay, outdoor 25 May – 7 June 2014 | 36 | SF | (Canada) Eugenie Bouchard | #16 | Win | 4–6, 7–5, 6–2 |
| French Open; Paris, France; Grand Slam; Clay, outdoor 25 May – 7 June 2014 | 37 | F | (Romania) Simona Halep | #4 | Win (3) | 6–4, 6–7^{(5–7)}, 6–4 |
| Wimbledon Championships; London, United Kingdom; Grand Slam; Grass, outdoor 23 June – 6 July 2014 | 38 | 1R | (United Kingdom) Samantha Murray (WC) | #247 | Win | 6–1, 6–0 |
| Wimbledon Championships; London, United Kingdom; Grand Slam; Grass, outdoor 23 June – 6 July 2014 | 39 | 2R | (Switzerland) Timea Bacsinszky (Q) | #85 | Win | 6–2, 6–1 |
| Wimbledon Championships; London, United Kingdom; Grand Slam; Grass, outdoor 23 June – 6 July 2014 | 40 | 3R | (United States) Alison Riske | #44 | Win | 6–3, 6–0 |
| Wimbledon Championships; London, United Kingdom; Grand Slam; Grass, outdoor 23 June – 6 July 2014 | 41 | 4R | (Germany) Angelique Kerber | #7 | Loss | 6–7^{(4–7)}, 6–4, 4–6 |
| Rogers Cup; Montreal, Canada; WTA Premier Five; Hard, outdoor 4–10 August 2014 | – | 1R | Bye | | | |
| Rogers Cup; Montreal, Canada; WTA Premier Five; Hard, outdoor 4–10 August 2014 | 42 | 2R | (Spain) Garbiñe Muguruza | #27 | Win | 4–6, 6–3, 6–1 |
| Rogers Cup; Montreal, Canada; WTA Premier Five; Hard, outdoor 4–10 August 2014 | 43 | 3R | (Spain) Carla Suárez Navarro | #16 | Loss | 2–6, 6–4, 2–6 |
| Western & Southern Open; Cincinnati, United States of America; WTA Premier Five; Hard, outdoor 11–17 August 2014 | – | 1R | Bye | | | |
| Western & Southern Open; Cincinnati, United States of America; WTA Premier Five; Hard, outdoor 11–17 August 2014 | 44 | 2R | (United States) Madison Keys | #28 | Win | 6–1, 3–6, 6–3 |
| Western & Southern Open; Cincinnati, United States of America; WTA Premier Five; Hard, outdoor 11–17 August 2014 | 45 | 3R | (Russia) Anastasia Pavlyuchenkova | #25 | Win | 6–4, 7–6 ^{(7–2)} |
| Western & Southern Open; Cincinnati, United States of America; WTA Premier Five; Hard, outdoor 11–17 August 2014 | 46 | QF | (Romania) Simona Halep | #2 | Win | 3–6, 6–4, 6–4 |
| Western & Southern Open; Cincinnati, United States of America; WTA Premier Five; Hard, outdoor 11–17 August 2014 | 47 | SF | (Serbia) Ana Ivanovic | #11 | Loss | 2–6, 7–5, 5–7 |
| US Open; New York City, United States; Grand Slam; Hard, outdoor 25 August – 8 September 2014 | 48 | 1R | (Russia) Maria Kirilenko | #113 | Win | 6–4, 6–0 |
| US Open; New York City, United States; Grand Slam; Hard, outdoor 25 August – 8 September 2014 | 49 | 2R | (Romania) Alexandra Dulgheru | #95 | Win | 4–6, 6–3, 6–2 |
| US Open; New York City, United States; Grand Slam; Hard, outdoor 25 August – 8 September 2014 | 50 | 3R | (Germany) Sabine Lisicki | #28 | Win | 6–2, 6–4 |
| US Open; New York City, United States; Grand Slam; Hard, outdoor 25 August – 8 September 2014 | 51 | 4R | (Denmark) Caroline Wozniacki | #11 | Loss | 4–6, 6–2, 2–6 |
| Wuhan Open; Wuhan, China; WTA Premier 5 Hard, outdoor 21–27 September 2014 | – | 1R | Bye | | | |
| Wuhan Open; Wuhan, China; WTA Premier 5 Hard, outdoor 21–27 September 2014 | 52 | 2R | (Russia) Svetlana Kuznetsova | #25 | Win | 3–6, 6–2, 6–2 |
| Wuhan Open; Wuhan, China; WTA Premier 5 Hard, outdoor 21–27 September 2014 | 53 | 3R | (Switzerland) Timea Bacsinszky | #61 | Loss | 6–7^{(3–7)}, 5–7 |
| China Open; Beijing, China; WTA Premier Mandatory; Hard, outdoor 29 September – 5 October 2014 | 54 | 1R | (Estonia) Kaia Kanepi | #45 | Win | 6–4, 6–1 |
| China Open; Beijing, China; WTA Premier Mandatory; Hard, outdoor 29 September – 5 October 2014 | 55 | 2R | (Ukraine) Elina Svitolina | #33 | Win | 6–2, 6–2 |
| China Open; Beijing, China; WTA Premier Mandatory; Hard, outdoor 29 September – 5 October 2014 | 56 | 3R | (Spain) Carla Suárez Navarro | #18 | Win | 6–1, 7–6^{(7–3)} |
| China Open; Beijing, China; WTA Premier Mandatory; Hard, outdoor 29 September – 5 October 2014 | 57 | QF | (Russia) Svetlana Kuznetsova | #27 | Win | 6–0, 6–4 |
| China Open; Beijing, China; WTA Premier Mandatory; Hard, outdoor 29 September – 5 October 2014 | 58 | SF | (Serbia) Ana Ivanovic | #9 | Win | 6–0, 6–4 |
| China Open; Beijing, China; WTA Premier Mandatory; Hard, outdoor 29 September – 5 October 2014 | 59 | F | (Czech Republic) Petra Kvitová | #3 | Win (4) | 6–4, 2–6, 6–3 |
| WTA Finals; Singapore; Year-End Championship; Hard, indoor 17 – 26 October 2014 | 60 | RR | (Denmark) Caroline Wozniacki | #8 | Loss | 6–7^{(4–7)}, 7–6^{(7–5)}, 2–6 |
| WTA Finals; Singapore; Year-End Championship; Hard, indoor 17 – 26 October 2014 | 61 | RR | (Czech Republic) Petra Kvitová | #3 | Loss | 3–6, 2–6 |
| WTA Finals; Singapore; Year-End Championship; Hard, indoor 17 – 26 October 2014 | 62 | RR | (Poland) Agnieszka Radwańska | #6 | Win | 7–5, 6–7^{(4–7)}, 6–2 |

== Yearly records ==
=== Head-to-head matchups ===
Ordered by number of wins

- (Romania) Simona Halep 3–0
- (Poland) Agnieszka Radwańska 3–0
- (Belgium) Kirsten Flipkens 2–0
- (Estonia) Kaia Kanepi 2–0
- (Russia) Svetlana Kuznetsova 2–0
- (Spain) Garbiñe Muguruza 2–0
- (Czech Republic) Lucie Šafářová 2–0
- (Australia) Samantha Stosur 2–0
- (Czech Republic) Petra Kvitová 2–1
- (Russia) Anastasia Pavlyuchenkova 2–1
- (Serbia) Ana Ivanovic 2–2
- (Canada) Eugenie Bouchard 1–0
- (France) Alizé Cornet 1–0
- (Romania) Alexandra Dulgheru 1–0
- (Italy) Sara Errani 1–0
- (France) Caroline Garcia 1–0
- (Germany) Julia Görges 1–0
- (Slovakia) Daniela Hantuchová 1–0
- (United States) Madison Keys 1–0
- (Russia) Maria Kirilenko 1–0
- (Italy) Karin Knapp 1–0
- (Czech Republic) Klára Koukalová 1–0
- (China) Li Na 1–0
- (Germany) Sabine Lisicki 1–0
- (United States) Bethanie Mattek-Sands 1–0
- (United States) Christina McHale 1–0
- (United Kingdom) Samantha Murray 1–0
- (Japan) Kurumi Nara 1–0
- (Argentina) Paula Ormaechea 1–0
- (Russia) Ksenia Pervak 1–0
- (Bulgaria) Tsvetana Pironkova 1–0
- (Puerto Rico) Monica Puig 1–0
- (United States) Alison Riske 1–0
- (Ukraine) Elina Svitolina 1–0
- (Switzerland) Timea Bacsinszky 1–1
- (Spain) Carla Suárez Navarro 1–1
- (Slovakia) Dominika Cibulková 0–1
- (Italy) Camila Giorgi 0–1
- (Germany) Angelique Kerber 0–1
- (United States) Serena Williams 0–2
- (Denmark) Caroline Wozniacki 0–2

=== Finals ===
==== Singles: 4 (4–0) ====
| Legend Grand Slams (1–0) WTA Tour Championships (0–0) WTA Premier Mandatory (2–0) WTA Premier 5 (0–0) WTA Premier (1–0) WTA International (0–0) | Finals by surface Clay (3–0) Hard (1–0) | Finals by venue Outdoors (3–0) Indoors (1–0) |

| Outcome | No. | Date | Championship | Surface | Opponent in the final | Score in the final |
|---|---|---|---|---|---|---|
| Winner | 30. | 27 April 2014 | Stuttgart Open, Stuttgart, Germany (3) | Clay (i) | (Serbia) Ana Ivanovic | 3–6, 6–4, 6–1 |
| Winner | 31. | 11 May 2014 | Madrid Open, Madrid, Spain | Clay | (Romania) Simona Halep | 1–6, 6–2, 6–3 |
| Winner | 32. | 7 June 2014 | French Open, Paris, France (2) | Clay | (Romania) Simona Halep | 6–4, 6–7^{(5–7)}, 6–4 |
| Winner | 33. | 5 October 2014 | China Open, Beijing, China | Hard | (Czech Republic) Petra Kvitová | 6–4, 2–6, 6–3 |

=== Earnings ===
| # | Event | Prize money | Year-to-date |
|---|---|---|---|
| 1 | Brisbane International | $56,298 | $56,298 |
| 2 | Australian Open | $119,683 | $175,981 |
| 3 | Open GDF Suez | $34,350 | $210,331 |
| 4 | BNP Paribas Open | $28,000 | $238,331 |
| 5 | Sony Open Tennis | $192,485 | $430,816 |
| 6 | Porsche Tennis Grand Prix | $120,000 | $550,816 |
| 7 | Mutua Madrid Open | $938,101 | $1,488,917 |
| 8 | Internazionali BNL d'Italia | $27,354 | $1,516,271 |
| 9 | French Open | $2,174,835 | $3,691,106 |
| 10 | Wimbledon | $182,354 | $3,873,460 |
| 11 | Rogers Cup | $24,630 | $3,898,090 |
| 12 | Western & Southern Open | $113,770 | $4,011,860 |
| 13 | US Open | $187,362 | $4,199,222 |
| 14 | Wuhan Open | $25,135 | $4,224,357 |
| 15 | China Open | $935,000 | $5,159,357 |
| 16 | WTA Finals | $283,000 | $5,442,357 |
| Bonus Pool | | $397,000 | $5,839,357 |
| | | | $5,839,357 |

Figures in United States dollars (USD) unless noted.

== See also ==
- 2014 Victoria Azarenka tennis season
- 2014 Li Na tennis season
- 2014 Serena Williams tennis season
- 2014 WTA Tour
- Maria Sharapova career statistics
