= 2014 Qatar Total Open =

- Date: 10–16 February
- Edition: 12th
- Category: WTA Premier 5
- Draw: 56S / 26D
- Prize money: $2,440,070
- Surface: Hard
- Location: Doha, Qatar
- Venue: Khalifa International Tennis and Squash Complex

Champions

Singles
- (Romania) Simona Halep

Doubles
- (Chinese Taipei) Hsieh Su-wei / (China) Peng Shuai
← 2013 ·	Qatar Total Open	· 2015 →

The 2014 Qatar Total Open was a professional women's tennis tournament played on hard courts. It was the 12th edition of the event and part of the WTA Premier 5 series of the 2014 WTA Tour. It took place at the International Tennis and Squash complex in Doha, Qatar between 10 and 16 February 2014.

== Points and prize money ==
=== Point distribution ===
Event	W	F	SF	QF	Round of 16	Round of 32	Round of 64	Q	Q2	Q1
Singles	900	585	350	190	105	60	1	30	20	1
Doubles	900	585	350	190	105	1	—	—	—	—

=== Prize money ===
Event	W	F	SF	QF	Round of 16	Round of 32	Round of 64	Q2	Q1
Singles	$441,000	$220,200	$110,100	$50,700	$25,135	$12,900	$6,630	$3,700	$1,900
Doubles *	$126,000	$63,750	$31,665	$15,880	$8,020	3,980	—	—	—

_{* per team}

== Singles main-draw entrants ==
=== Seeds ===
Country	Player	Rank^{1}	Seed
CHN	Li Na	3	1
POL	Agnieszka Radwańska	4	2
CZE	Petra Kvitová	6	3
ITA	Sara Errani	7	4
SRB	Jelena Janković	8	5
GER	Angelique Kerber	9	6
ROU	Simona Halep	10	7
DEN	Caroline Wozniacki	11	8
SRB	Ana Ivanovic	12	9
SVK	Dominika Cibulková	13	10
ITA	Roberta Vinci	14	11
AUS	Samantha Stosur	16	12
~~ESP~~	~~Carla Suárez Navarro~~	~~17~~	~~13~~
USA	Sloane Stephens	18	14
CAN	Eugenie Bouchard	19	15
BEL	Kirsten Flipkens	20	16

- ^{1} Rankings as of February 3, 2014.

=== Other entrants ===
The following players received wildcards into the singles main draw:

- (Oman) Fatma Al-Nabhani
- (Turkey) Çağla Büyükakçay
- (Russia) Alisa Kleybanova

The following players received entry from the qualifying draw:

- (Czech Republic) Petra Cetkovská
- (Chinese Taipei) Hsieh Su-wei
- (Russia) Alla Kudryavtseva
- (Croatia) Mirjana Lučić-Baroni
- (Croatia) Petra Martić
- (Russia) Nadia Petrova
- (Bulgaria) Tsvetana Pironkova
- (Ukraine) Maryna Zanevska

The following player received entry as a lucky loser:

- (Slovenia) Tadeja Majerič

=== Withdrawals ===
Before the tournament

- (Belarus) Victoria Azarenka (foot injury) → replaced by (Germany) Annika Beck
- (United States) Jamie Hampton → replaced by (Switzerland) Stefanie Vögele
- (Serbia) Bojana Jovanovski → replaced by (France) Kristina Mladenovic
- (United States) Madison Keys → replaced by (Belgium) Yanina Wickmayer
- (Russia) Svetlana Kuznetsova → replaced by (China) Shuai Zhang
- (Germany) Sabine Lisicki (shoulder injury) → replaced by (Romania) Monica Niculescu
- (Russia) Ekaterina Makarova → replaced by (United States) Varvara Lepchenko
- (Spain) Carla Suárez Navarro (elbow injury) → replaced by (Slovenia) Tadeja Majerič
- (United States) Serena Williams (back injury) → replaced by (Czech Republic) Karolína Plíšková

=== Retirements ===
- (Slovakia) Dominika Cibulková (gastrointestinal illness)
- (Slovakia) Daniela Hantuchová (right knee injury)
- (Croatia) Mirjana Lučić-Baroni (low back injury)

== Doubles main-draw entrants ==
=== Seeds ===
Country	Player	Country	Player	Rank^{1}	Seed
ITA	Sara Errani	ITA	Roberta Vinci	2	1
TPE	Hsieh Su-wei	CHN	Peng Shuai	7	2
SLO	Katarina Srebotnik	CZE	Květa Peschke	17	3
ZIM	Cara Black	IND	Sania Mirza	22	4
CZE	Andrea Hlaváčková	CZE	Lucie Šafářová	25	5
USA	Raquel Kops-Jones	USA	Abigail Spears	36	6
RUS	Nadia Petrova	RUS	Anastasia Pavlyuchenkova	41	7
FRA	Kristina Mladenovic	ITA	Flavia Pennetta	48	8

- ^{1} Rankings as of February 3, 2014.

=== Other entrants ===
The following pairs received wildcards into the doubles main draw:

- (Oman) Fatma Al-Nabhani / (Slovakia) Michaela Hončová
- (Ukraine) Yuliya Beygelzimer / (Ukraine) Olga Savchuk
- (Belgium) Kirsten Flipkens / (Italy) Francesca Schiavone
- (Serbia) Jelena Janković / (Russia) Alisa Kleybanova

=== Withdrawals ===
During the tournament

- (Croatia) Mirjana Lučić-Baroni (low back injury)

== Champions ==
=== Singles ===
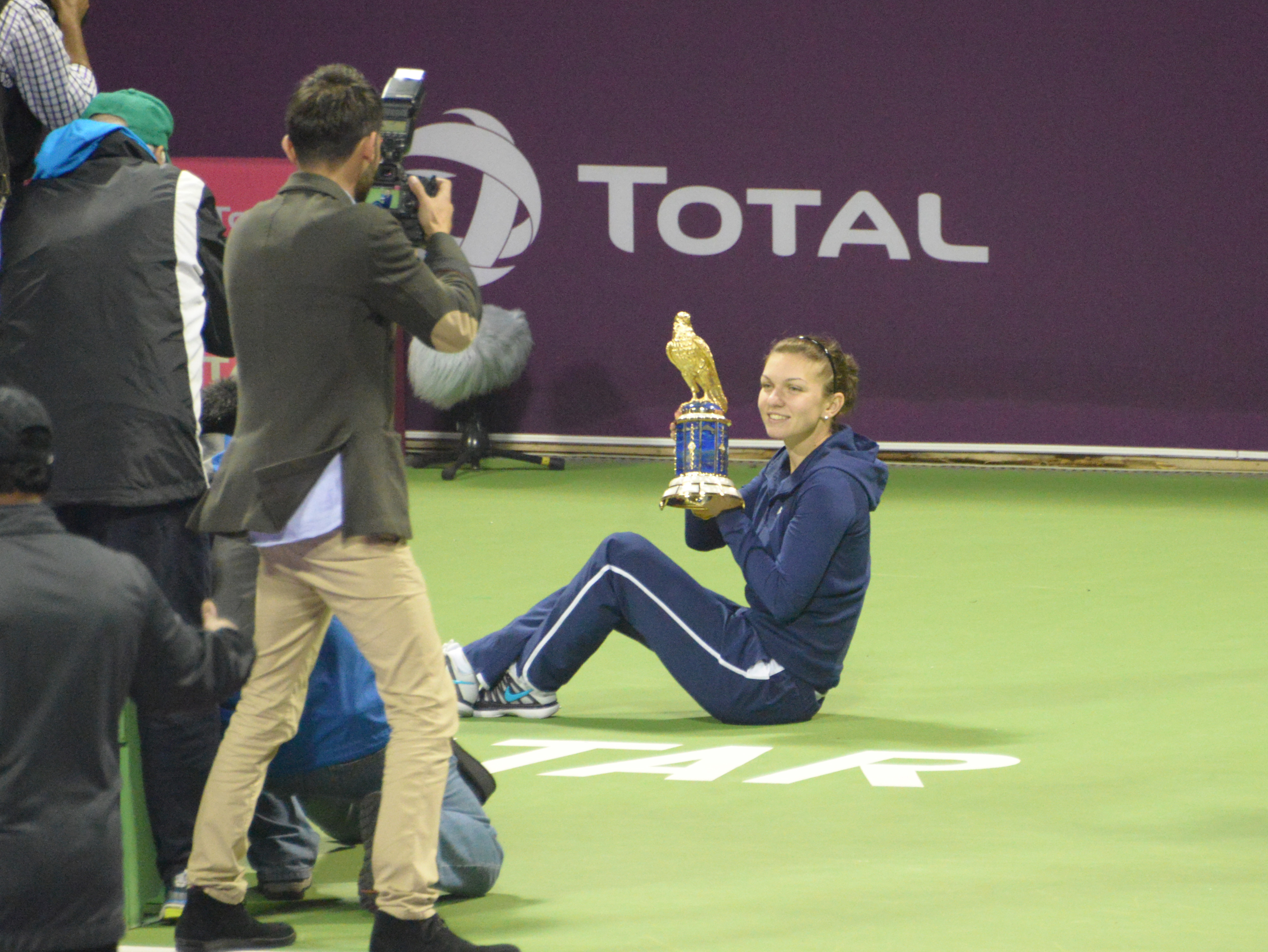
Halep posing with the trophy

- (Romania) Simona Halep def. (Germany) Angelique Kerber, 6–2, 6–3

=== Doubles ===
- (Chinese Taipei) Hsieh Su-wei / (China) Peng Shuai def. (Czech Republic) Květa Peschke / (Slovenia) Katarina Srebotnik, 6–4, 6–0
