= 2014 Porsche Tennis Grand Prix =

Women's tennis tournament

- Date: 21–27 April
- Edition: 37th
- Draw: 28S / 16D
- Prize money: $710,000
- Surface: Clay / indoor
- Location: Stuttgart, Germany
- Venue: Porsche Arena

Champions

Singles
- (Russia) Maria Sharapova

Doubles
- (Italy) Sara Errani / (Italy) Roberta Vinci
← 2013 ·	Porsche Tennis Grand Prix	· 2015 →

The 2014 Porsche Tennis Grand Prix was a women's tennis tournament played on indoor clay courts. It was the 37th edition of the Porsche Tennis Grand Prix, and was part of the Premier tournaments of the 2014 WTA Tour. It took place at the Porsche Arena in Stuttgart, Germany, from 21 April until 27 April 2014. Sixth-seeded Maria Sharapova won the singles title.

== Finals ==
=== Singles ===
- (Russia) Maria Sharapova defeated (Serbia) Ana Ivanovic, 3–6, 6–4, 6–1

=== Doubles ===
- (Italy) Sara Errani / (Italy) Roberta Vinci defeated (Zimbabwe) Cara Black / (India) Sania Mirza, 6–2, 6–3

== Points and prize money ==
=== Point distribution ===
Event	W	F	SF	QF	Round of 16	Round of 32	Q	Q3	Q2	Q1
Singles	470	305	185	100	55	1	25	18	13	1
Doubles	470	305	185	100	1	—	—	—	—	—

=== Prize money ===
Event	W	F	SF	QF	Round of 16	Round of 32	Q3	Q2	Q1
Singles	€96,774	€51,613	€27,702	€14,887	€7,984	€5,073	€2,298	€1,210	€685
Doubles *	€30,645	€16,129	€8,871	€4,516	€2,448	—	—	—	—

_{* per team}

== Singles main draw entrants ==
=== Seeds ===
Country	Player	Rank^{1}	Seed
POL	Agnieszka Radwańska	3	1
ROU	Simona Halep	5	2
CZE	Petra Kvitová	6	3
GER	Angelique Kerber	7	4
SRB	Jelena Janković	8	5
RUS	Maria Sharapova	9	6
~~SVK~~	~~Dominika Cibulková~~	~~10~~	~~7~~
ITA	Sara Errani	11	8
SRB	Ana Ivanovic	12	9

- ^{1} Rankings are as of April 14, 2014.

=== Other entrants ===
The following players received wildcards into the main draw:

- (Germany) Julia Görges
- (Germany) Andrea Petkovic

The following players received entry from the qualifying draw:

- (Italy) Gioia Barbieri
- (Germany) Annika Beck
- (Latvia) Diāna Marcinkēviča
- (Croatia) Ajla Tomljanović

The following players received entry as lucky losers:

- (Germany) Mona Barthel
- (United Kingdom) Johanna Konta

=== Withdrawals ===
Before the tournament

- (Slovakia) Dominika Cibulková (achilles injury) → replaced by (Germany) Mona Barthel
- (Belgium) Kirsten Flipkens → replaced by (Czech Republic) Lucie Šafářová
- (China) Li Na (left knee injury) → replaced by (Romania) Sorana Cîrstea
- (Denmark) Caroline Wozniacki (left wrist injury) → replaced by (United Kingdom) Johanna Konta

=== Retirements ===
- (Spain) Carla Suárez Navarro (wrist injury)

== Doubles main draw entrants ==
=== Seeds ===
Country	Player	Country	Player	Rank^{1}	Seed
ITA	Sara Errani	ITA	Roberta Vinci	10	1
ZIM	Cara Black	IND	Sania Mirza	17	2
RUS	Anastasia Pavlyuchenkova	SLO	Katarina Srebotnik	32	3
~~CZE~~	~~Andrea Hlaváčková~~	~~CZE~~	~~Lucie Šafářová~~	~~34~~	~~4~~

- Rankings are as of April 14, 2014.

=== Other entrants ===
The following pair received entry as alternates:

- (Germany) Antonia Lottner / (Germany) Anna Zaja

=== Retirements ===
Before the tournament

- (Czech Republic) Andrea Hlaváčková (viral illness)
