= 2014 Wuhan Open =

- Date: 21–27 September
- Edition: 1st
- Category: WTA Premier 5
- Draw: 56S / 32D
- Prize money: $2,440,070
- Surface: Hard / outdoor
- Location: Wuhan, China
- Venue: Optics Valley Int'l Tennis Center

Champions

Singles
- (Czech Republic) Petra Kvitová

Doubles
- (Switzerland) Martina Hingis / (Italy) Flavia Pennetta
Wuhan Open	· 2015 →

The 2014 Dongfeng Motor Wuhan Open was a professional women's tennis tournament played on outdoor hard courts. It was the first edition of the tournament and part of the WTA Premier 5 series of the 2014 WTA Tour. It took place at the Optics Valley International Tennis Center in Wuhan, China between 21 September and 27 September 2014. Third-seeded Petra Kvitová won the singles title.

== Finals ==
=== Singles ===
- (Czech Republic) Petra Kvitová defeated (Canada) Eugenie Bouchard, 6–3, 6–4

=== Doubles ===
- (Switzerland) Martina Hingis / (Italy) Flavia Pennetta defeated (Zimbabwe) Cara Black/ (France) Caroline Garcia, 6–4, 5–7, [12–10]

== Points and prize money ==
=== Point distribution ===
Event	W	F	SF	QF	Round of 16	Round of 32	Round of 64	Q	Q2	Q1
Singles	900	585	350	190	105	60	1	30	20	1
Doubles	900	585	350	190	105	1	—	—	—	—

=== Prize money ===
Event	W	F	SF	QF	Round of 16	Round of 32	Round of 64	Q2	Q1
Singles	$441,000	$220,200	$110,100	$50,700	$25,135	$12,900	$6,630	$3,700	$1,900
Doubles *	$126,000	$63,750	$31,665	$15,880	$8,020	3,980	—	—	—

_{* per team}

== Singles main-draw entrants ==
=== Seeds ===
Country	Player	Rank^{1}	Seed
USA	Serena Williams	1	1
ROU	Simona Halep	2	2
CZE	Petra Kvitová	3	3
RUS	Maria Sharapova	4	4
POL	Agnieszka Radwańska	5	5
CAN	Eugenie Bouchard	7	6
GER	Angelique Kerber	8	7
DEN	Caroline Wozniacki	9	8
SRB	Ana Ivanovic	10	9
SRB	Jelena Janković	11	10
ITA	Sara Errani	12	11
SVK	Dominika Cibulková	13	12
RUS	Ekaterina Makarova	14	13
CZE	Lucie Šafářová	15	14
ITA	Flavia Pennetta	16	15
GER	Andrea Petkovic	17	16

- ^{1} Rankings as of September 15, 2014.

=== Other entrants ===
The following players received wildcards into the singles main draw:

- (Belarus) Victoria Azarenka
- (Belgium) Kirsten Flipkens
- (Spain) María Teresa Torró Flor
- (China) Xu Shilin
- (China) Zhang Kailin

The following players received entry from the qualifying draw:

- (Switzerland) Timea Bacsinszky
- (Kazakhstan) Zarina Diyas
- (New Zealand) Marina Erakovic
- (Australia) Jarmila Gajdošová
- (Italy) Karin Knapp
- (Italy) Francesca Schiavone
- (Croatia) Donna Vekić
- (Switzerland) Stefanie Vögele

The following player received entry as a lucky loser:

- (Germany) Annika Beck

=== Withdrawals ===
Before the tournament

- (Belarus) Victoria Azarenka (right foot injury) → replaced by (Germany) Annika Beck
- (China) Li Na (retirement from professional tennis) → replaced by (United States) Christina McHale
- (United States) Sloane Stephens → replaced by (United Kingdom) Heather Watson

During the tournament

- (Spain) Garbiñe Muguruza (gastritis)

=== Retirements ===
- (Slovakia) Dominika Cibulková (left ankle injury)
- (Serbia) Ana Ivanovic (left thigh injury)
- (Serbia) Jelena Janković (back injury)
- (United States) Serena Williams (viral illness)
- (China) Xu Shilin (heat illness)

== Doubles main-draw entrants ==
=== Seeds ===
Country	Player	Country	Player	Rank^{1}	Seed
ITA	Sara Errani	ITA	Roberta Vinci	2	1
CZE	Květa Peschke	SLO	Katarina Srebotnik	19	2
USA	Raquel Kops-Jones	USA	Abigail Spears	22	3
CZE	Andrea Hlaváčková	CHN	Peng Shuai	25	4
RUS	Alla Kudryavtseva	AUS	Anastasia Rodionova	30	5
SUI	Martina Hingis	ITA	Flavia Pennetta	37	6
ESP	Garbiñe Muguruza	ESP	Carla Suárez Navarro	37	7
ZIM	Cara Black	FRA	Caroline Garcia	51	8

- ^{1} Rankings as of September 15, 2014.

=== Other entrants ===
The following pairs received wildcards into the doubles main draw:

- (Slovakia) Dominika Cibulková / (Belgium) Kirsten Flipkens
- (United States) Bethanie Mattek-Sands / (Germany) Andrea Petkovic
- (China) Wang Yafan / (China) Zhu Lin

The following pair received entry as alternates:

- (China) Tian Ran / (China) Yang Zhaoxuan

=== Withdrawals ===
Before the tournament

- (Slovakia) Dominika Cibulková (left ankle injury)
- (Czech Republic) Lucie Šafářová (viral illness)

During the tournament

- (Spain) Garbiñe Muguruza (gastritis)

=== Retirements ===
- (United States) Bethanie Mattek-Sands (viral illness)
