= 2014 Rogers Cup =

- Date: August 2–10
- Edition: 125th (men) / 113th (women)
- Category: ATP World Tour Masters 1000 (men); WTA Premier 5 (women)
- Surface: Hard / outdoor
- Location: Toronto, Canada (men); Montreal, Canada (women)

Champions

Men's singles
- (France) Jo-Wilfried Tsonga

Women's singles
- (Poland) Agnieszka Radwańska

Men's doubles
- (Austria) Alexander Peya / (Brazil) Bruno Soares

Women's doubles
- (Italy) Sara Errani / (Italy) Roberta Vinci
- Canadian Open

The 2014 Rogers Cup presented by National Bank was a tennis tournament played on outdoor hard courts. It was the 125th edition (for the men) and the 113th (for the women) of the Canadian Open, and was part of the ATP World Tour Masters 1000 of the 2014 ATP World Tour, and of the WTA Premier 5 tournaments of the 2014 WTA Tour. The men's event was held at the Rexall Centre in Toronto, from August 2 to August 10 and the women's event at the Uniprix Stadium in Montreal, from August 2 to August 10, 2014.

== Points and prize money ==
=== Point distribution ===
| Event | W | F | SF | QF | Round of 16 | Round of 32 | Round of 64 | Q | Q2 | Q1 |
| Men's singles | 1000 | 600 | 360 | 180 | 90 | 45 | 10 | 25 | 16 | 0 |
| Men's doubles | 1000 | 600 | 360 | 180 | 90 | 0 | —N/a | —N/a | —N/a | —N/a |
| Women's singles | 900 | 585 | 350 | 190 | 105 | 60 | 1 | 30 | 20 | 1 |
| Women's doubles | 900 | 585 | 350 | 190 | 105 | 5 | —N/a | —N/a | —N/a | —N/a |

=== Prize money ===
| Event | W | F | SF | QF | Round of 16 | Round of 32 | Round of 64 | Q2 | Q1 |
| Men's singles | $598,900 | $293,650 | $147,800 | $75,155 | $39,025 | $20,575 | $11,110 | $2,560 | $1,305 |
| Women's singles | $441,000 | $220,000 | $110,100 | $50,700 | $25,135 | $12,900 | $6,630 | $3,700 | $1,900 |
| Men's doubles | $185,470 | $90,800 | $45,550 | $23,380 | $12,080 | $6,370 | —N/a | —N/a | —N/a |
| Women's doubles | $122,000 | $61,600 | $30,490 | $15,340 | $7,780 | $3,840 | —N/a | —N/a | —N/a |

== ATP singles main-draw entrants ==
=== Seeds ===
| Country | Player | Rank^{1} | Seed |
|---|---|---|---|
| SRB | Novak Djokovic | 1 | 1 |
| SUI | Roger Federer | 3 | 2 |
| SUI | Stan Wawrinka | 4 | 3 |
| CZE | Tomáš Berdych | 5 | 4 |
| ESP | David Ferrer | 6 | 5 |
| CAN | Milos Raonic | 7 | 6 |
| BUL | Grigor Dimitrov | 9 | 7 |
| GBR | Andy Murray | 10 | 8 |
| ~~JPN~~ | ~~Kei Nishikori~~ | ~~11~~ | ~~9~~ |
| USA | John Isner | 12 | 10 |
| LAT | Ernests Gulbis | 13 | 11 |
| FRA | Richard Gasquet | 14 | 12 |
| FRA | Jo-Wilfried Tsonga | 15 | 13 |
| ESP | Roberto Bautista Agut | 16 | 14 |
| CRO | Marin Čilić | 18 | 15 |
| ITA | Fabio Fognini | 19 | 16 |
| ESP | Tommy Robredo | 20 | 17 |

- ^{1}Rankings are as of July 28, 2014

=== Other entrants ===
The following players received wild cards into the main singles draw:

- (Canada) Frank Dancevic
- (Australia) Nick Kyrgios
- (Canada) Peter Polansky
- (United States) Jack Sock

The following player received entry as a special exempt:

- (United States) Donald Young

The following players received entry from the singles qualifying draw:

- (Germany) Tobias Kamke
- (Australia) Thanasi Kokkinakis
- (France) Benoît Paire
- (United States) Michael Russell
- (Canada) Brayden Schnur
- (United States) Tim Smyczek
- (Australia) Bernard Tomic

The following player received entry as a lucky loser:

- (Tunisia) Malek Jaziri
- ~~(Australia) Marinko Matosevic~~

=== Withdrawals ===
Before the tournament

- (Spain) Nicolás Almagro (foot injury) → replaced by (France) Édouard Roger-Vasselin
- (Argentina) Carlos Berlocq → replaced by (Colombia) Alejandro Falla
- (Argentina) Juan Martín del Potro (wrist injury) → replaced by (Uzbekistan) Denis Istomin
- (Ukraine) Alexandr Dolgopolov (knee injury) → replaced by (France) Julien Benneteau
- (Germany) Tommy Haas (shoulder injury) → replaced by (Australia) Lleyton Hewitt
- (Germany) Florian Mayer (groin injury) → replaced by (Chinese Taipei) Lu Yen-hsun
- (Spain) Rafael Nadal (wrist injury) → replaced by (Austria) Jürgen Melzer
- (Japan) Kei Nishikori (right foot injury) → replaced by (Tunisia) Malek Jaziri
- (Russia) Dmitry Tursunov → replaced by (France) Nicolas Mahut
- (Spain) Fernando Verdasco → replaced by (Austria) Dominic Thiem

During the tournament

- (France) Richard Gasquet

== ATP doubles main-draw entrants ==
=== Seeds ===
| Country | Player | Country | Player | Rank^{1} | Seed |
|---|---|---|---|---|---|
| USA | Bob Bryan | USA | Mike Bryan | 2 | 1 |
| AUT | Alexander Peya | BRA | Bruno Soares | 6 | 2 |
| CAN | Daniel Nestor | SRB | Nenad Zimonjić | 11 | 3 |
| CRO | Ivan Dodig | BRA | Marcelo Melo | 17 | 4 |
| FRA | Julien Benneteau | FRA | Édouard Roger-Vasselin | 19 | 5 |
| IND | Leander Paes | CZE | Radek Štěpánek | 21 | 6 |
| ESP | Marcel Granollers | ESP | Marc López | 30 | 7 |
| FRA | Michaël Llodra | FRA | Nicolas Mahut | 37 | 8 |

- Rankings are as of July 28, 2014

=== Other entrants ===
The following pairs received wildcards into the doubles main draw:

- (Canada) Frank Dancevic / (Canada) Adil Shamasdin
- (Canada) Vasek Pospisil / (United States) Jack Sock

=== Withdrawals ===
Before the tournament

- (Canada) Vasek Pospisil (right leg injury)

During the tournament

- (France) Richard Gasquet

== WTA singles main-draw entrants ==
=== Seeds ===
| Country | Player | Rank^{1} | Seed |
|---|---|---|---|
| USA | Serena Williams | 1 | 1 |
| CZE | Petra Kvitová | 4 | 2 |
| POL | Agnieszka Radwańska | 5 | 3 |
| RUS | Maria Sharapova | 6 | 4 |
| CAN | Eugenie Bouchard | 7 | 5 |
| GER | Angelique Kerber | 8 | 6 |
| SRB | Jelena Janković | 9 | 7 |
| BLR | Victoria Azarenka | 10 | 8 |
| SRB | Ana Ivanovic | 11 | 9 |
| SVK | Dominika Cibulková | 12 | 10 |
| DEN | Caroline Wozniacki | 13 | 11 |
| ITA | Flavia Pennetta | 14 | 12 |
| ITA | Sara Errani | 15 | 13 |
| ESP | Carla Suárez Navarro | 16 | 14 |
| CZE | Lucie Šafářová | 17 | 15 |
| ~~GER~~ | ~~Andrea Petkovic~~ | ~~18~~ | ~~16~~ |

- ^{1} Rankings are as of July 28, 2014

=== Other entrants ===
The following players received wild cards into the main singles draw:

- (Canada) Françoise Abanda
- (Croatia) Ajla Tomljanović
- (Canada) Aleksandra Wozniak

The following player used protected ranking to gain entry into the singles main draw:

- (Switzerland) Romina Oprandi

The following players received entry from the singles qualifying draw:

- (Switzerland) Timea Bacsinszky
- (Netherlands) Kiki Bertens
- (United States) Lauren Davis
- (Canada) Stéphanie Dubois
- (Italy) Karin Knapp
- (Puerto Rico) Monica Puig
- (Kazakhstan) Yulia Putintseva
- (United States) Shelby Rogers
- (Czech Republic) Tereza Smitková
- (United States) CoCo Vandeweghe
- (United Kingdom) Heather Watson
- (Belgium) Yanina Wickmayer

The following players received entry as lucky losers:

- (Czech Republic) Karolína Plíšková
- (Russia) Elena Vesnina

=== Withdrawals ===
Before the tournament

- (China) Li Na (knee injury) → replaced by (United States) Alison Riske
- (Austria) Yvonne Meusburger → replaced by (Czech Republic) Barbora Záhlavová-Strýcová
- (Germany) Andrea Petkovic (viral illness) → replaced by (Russia) Elena Vesnina
- (Russia) Vera Zvonareva → replaced by (Czech Republic) Karolína Plíšková

=== Retirements ===
- (Russia) Svetlana Kuznetsova (personal reasons)

== WTA doubles main-draw entrants ==
=== Seeds ===
| Country | Player | Country | Player | Rank^{1} | Seed |
|---|---|---|---|---|---|
| ITA | Sara Errani | ITA | Roberta Vinci | 2 | 1 |
| TPE | Hsieh Su-wei | CHN | Peng Shuai | 7 | 2 |
| CZE | Květa Peschke | SLO | Katarina Srebotnik | 13 | 3 |
| ZIM | Cara Black | IND | Sania Mirza | 15 | 4 |
| RUS | Ekaterina Makarova | RUS | Elena Vesnina | 17 | 5 |
| USA | Raquel Kops-Jones | USA | Abigail Spears | 26 | 6 |
| HUN | Tímea Babos | FRA | Kristina Mladenovic | 31 | 7 |
| RUS | Alla Kudryavtseva | AUS | Anastasia Rodionova | 40 | 8 |

- Rankings are as of July 28, 2014

=== Other entrants ===
The following pairs received wildcards into the doubles main draw:

- (Canada) Françoise Abanda / (Canada) Stéphanie Dubois
- (Canada) Gabriela Dabrowski / (Israel) Shahar Pe'er
- (Belgium) Kirsten Flipkens / (Czech Republic) Petra Kvitová

The following pair received entry as alternates:

- (Croatia) Darija Jurak / (United States) Megan Moulton-Levy

=== Withdrawals ===
Before the tournament

- (Germany) Andrea Petkovic (viral illness)

== Finals ==
=== Men's singles ===
- (France) Jo-Wilfried Tsonga defeated (Switzerland) Roger Federer, 7–5, 7–6^{(7–3)}

=== Women's singles ===
- (Poland) Agnieszka Radwańska defeated (United States) Venus Williams, 6–4, 6–2

=== Men's doubles ===
- (Austria) Alexander Peya / (Brazil) Bruno Soares defeated (Croatia) Ivan Dodig / (Brazil) Marcelo Melo, 6–4, 6–3

=== Women's doubles ===
- (Italy) Sara Errani / (Italy) Roberta Vinci defeated (Zimbabwe) Cara Black / (India) Sania Mirza, 7–6^{(7–4)}, 6–3
