= 2014 Mutua Madrid Open =

- Date: 3–11 May
- Edition: 13th (ATP); 6th (WTA)
- Draw: 56S / 24D; 64S / 28D
- Prize money: €4,625,835 €4,033,254
- Surface: Clay
- Location: Madrid, Spain
- Venue: Park Manzanares

Champions

Men's singles
- (Spain) Rafael Nadal

Women's singles
- (Russia) Maria Sharapova

Men's doubles
- (Canada) Daniel Nestor / (Serbia) Nenad Zimonjić

Women's doubles
- (Italy) Sara Errani / (Italy) Roberta Vinci
- Madrid Open

The 2014 Madrid Open (also known as the Mutua Madrid Open for sponsorship reasons) was a professional tennis tournament that was played on outdoor clay courts at the Park Manzanares in Madrid, Spain from 3–11 May. It was the 13th edition of the event on the ATP World Tour and 6th on the WTA Tour. It was classified as an ATP World Tour Masters 1000 event on the 2014 ATP World Tour and a Premier Mandatory event on the 2014 WTA Tour.

Ion Țiriac the former Romanian ATP player and now billionaire businessman is the current owner of the tournament.

== Points and prize money ==
=== Point distribution ===
Event	W	F	SF	QF	Round of 16	Round of 32	Round of 64	Q	Q2	Q1
Men's singles	1000	600	360	180	90	45	10	25	16	0
Men's doubles	1000	600	360	180	90	0	—N/a	—N/a	—N/a	—N/a
Women's singles	1000	650	390	215	120	65	10	30	20	2
Women's doubles	1000	650	390	215	120	10	—N/a	—N/a	—N/a	—N/a

=== Prize money ===
The prize money for 2014 tournament across all rounds is €4,625,835 for the men's event, and €4,033,254 for the women.

== ATP singles main-draw entrants ==
=== Seeds ===
Country	Player	Rank^{1}	Seed
ESP	Rafael Nadal	1	1
~~SRB~~	~~Novak Djokovic~~	~~2~~	~~2~~
SUI	Stanislas Wawrinka	3	3
~~SUI~~	~~Roger Federer~~	~~4~~	~~4~~
ESP	David Ferrer	5	5
CZE	Tomáš Berdych	6	6
GBR	Andy Murray	8	7
CAN	Milos Raonic	9	8
USA	John Isner	10	9
JPN	Kei Nishikori	12	10
FRA	Jo-Wilfried Tsonga	13	11
BUL	Grigor Dimitrov	14	12
ITA	Fabio Fognini	15	13
GER	Tommy Haas	16	14
RUS	Mikhail Youzhny	17	15
ESP	Tommy Robredo	18	16

- Rankings are as of 28 April 2014.

=== Other entrants ===
The following players received wildcards into the main draw:

- (Spain) Pablo Carreño Busta
- (Romania) Marius Copil
- (Spain) Guillermo García López
- (Spain) Albert Ramos

The following player received entry using a protected ranking into the main draw:

- (Austria) Jürgen Melzer

The following players received entry from the qualifying draw:

- (Germany) Benjamin Becker
- (Russia) Teymuraz Gabashvili
- (Colombia) Santiago Giraldo
- (Kazakhstan) Andrey Golubev
- (France) Paul-Henri Mathieu
- (Netherlands) Igor Sijsling
- (Austria) Dominic Thiem

The following player received entry as lucky losers:

- (Poland) Łukasz Kubot
- (Australia) Marinko Matosevic

=== Withdrawals ===
Before the tournament

- (Argentina) Juan Martín del Potro (wrist injury) → replaced by (Argentina) Federico Delbonis
- (Serbia) Novak Djokovic (arm injury) → replaced by (Australia) Marinko Matosevic
- (Switzerland) Roger Federer (personal reasons – birth of children) → replaced by (Poland) Łukasz Kubot
- (France) Richard Gasquet (back injury) → replaced by (Spain) Roberto Bautista Agut
- (Germany) Florian Mayer → replaced by (Netherlands) Robin Haase
- (France) Gaël Monfils → replaced by (France) Jérémy Chardy
- (Canada) Vasek Pospisil → replaced by (Czech Republic) Radek Štěpánek

During the tournament

- (Austria) Dominic Thiem (illness)

=== Retirements ===
- (Japan) Kei Nishikori (back injury)
- (France) Benoît Paire (knee injury)

== ATP doubles main-draw entrants ==
=== Seeds ===
Country	Player	Country	Player	Rank^{1}	Seed
USA	Bob Bryan	USA	Mike Bryan	2	1
AUT	Alexander Peya	BRA	Bruno Soares	6	2
CRO	Ivan Dodig	BRA	Marcelo Melo	11	3
ESP	David Marrero	ESP	Fernando Verdasco	19	4
FRA	Michaël Llodra	FRA	Nicolas Mahut	26	5
CAN	Daniel Nestor	SRB	Nenad Zimonjić	29	6
POL	Łukasz Kubot	SWE	Robert Lindstedt	34	7
IND	Rohan Bopanna	PAK	Aisam-ul-Haq Qureshi	40	8

- Rankings are as of 28 April 2014.

=== Other entrants ===
The following pairs received wildcards into the doubles main draw:

- (Israel) Jonathan Erlich / (Czech Republic) Lukáš Rosol
- (Spain) Feliciano López / (Argentina) Juan Mónaco

=== Withdrawals ===
During the tournament

- (United States) John Isner (back injury)
- (Canada) Milos Raonic (shoulder injury)

== WTA singles main-draw entrants ==
=== Seeds ===
Country	Player	Rank^{1}	Seed
USA	Serena Williams	1	1
CHN	Li Na	2	2
POL	Agnieszka Radwańska	3	3
ROU	Simona Halep	5	4
CZE	Petra Kvitová	6	5
SRB	Jelena Janković	7	6
GER	Angelique Kerber	8	7
RUS	Maria Sharapova	9	8
SVK	Dominika Cibulková	10	9
ITA	Sara Errani	11	10
SRB	Ana Ivanovic	12	11
ITA	Flavia Pennetta	13	12
DEN	Caroline Wozniacki	14	13
ESP	Carla Suárez Navarro	15	14
GER	Sabine Lisicki	16	15
USA	Sloane Stephens	17	16

- Rankings are as of 28 April 2014.

=== Other entrants ===
The following players received wildcards into the main draw:

- (Spain) Lara Arruabarrena
- (Romania) Irina-Camelia Begu
- (Spain) Anabel Medina Garrigues
- (Spain) Sílvia Soler Espinosa
- (Spain) María Teresa Torró Flor

The following players received entry from the qualifying draw:

- (Switzerland) Belinda Bencic
- (Czech Republic) Petra Cetkovská
- (Colombia) Mariana Duque Mariño
- (France) Caroline Garcia
- (Germany) Julia Görges
- (France) Kristina Mladenovic
- (Romania) Monica Niculescu
- (Czech Republic) Karolína Plíšková

=== Withdrawals ===
Before the tournament

- (Belarus) Victoria Azarenka (foot injury) → replaced by (United States) Lauren Davis
- (United States) Bethanie Mattek-Sands → replaced by (China) Zheng Jie
- (United States) Venus Williams (illness) → replaced by (United States) Christina McHale

During the tournament

- (Russia) Maria Kirilenko (left ankle injury)
- (United States) Serena Williams (left thigh injury)

=== Retirements ===
- (Germany) Angelique Kerber (lower back injury)

== WTA doubles main-draw entrants ==
=== Seeds ===
Country	Player	Country	Player	Rank^{1}	Seed
TPE	Hsieh Su-wei	CHN	Peng Shuai	3	1
ITA	Sara Errani	ITA	Roberta Vinci	6	2
RUS	Ekaterina Makarova	RUS	Elena Vesnina	11	3
CZE	Květa Peschke	SLO	Katarina Srebotnik	17	4
ZIM	Cara Black	IND	Sania Mirza	17	5
USA	Raquel Kops-Jones	USA	Abigail Spears	30	6
RUS	Alla Kudryavtseva	AUS	Anastasia Rodionova	38	7
GER	Julia Görges	GER	Anna-Lena Grönefeld	43	8

- Rankings are as of 28 April 2014.

=== Other entrants ===
The following pairs received wildcards into the doubles main draw:

- (Switzerland) Belinda Bencic / (Russia) Maria Kirilenko
- (Spain) Garbiñe Muguruza / (Spain) Carla Suárez Navarro
- (Germany) Andrea Petkovic / (United States) Sloane Stephens
- (Italy) Francesca Schiavone / (Spain) Sílvia Soler Espinosa

=== Withdrawals ===
During the tournament

- (Russia) Maria Kirilenko (left ankle injury)

== Finals ==
=== Men's singles ===
- (Spain) Rafael Nadal defeated (Japan) Kei Nishikori, 2–6, 6–4, 3–0, ret.

=== Women's singles ===
- (Russia) Maria Sharapova defeated (Romania) Simona Halep, 1–6, 6–2, 6–3

=== Men's doubles ===
- (Canada) Daniel Nestor / (Serbia) Nenad Zimonjić defeated (United States) Bob Bryan / (United States) Mike Bryan, 6–4, 6–2

=== Women's doubles ===
- (Italy) Sara Errani / (Italy) Roberta Vinci defeated (Spain) Garbiñe Muguruza / (Spain) Carla Suárez Navarro, 6–4, 6–3
