= 2014 Toray Pan Pacific Open – Singles =

Singles
- 2014 Toray Pan Pacific Open

Final
- Champion: (Serbia) Ana Ivanovic
- Runner-up: (Denmark) Caroline Wozniacki
- Score: 6–2, 7–6^{(7–2)}

Details
- Draw: 28 (4 Q / 2 WC )
- Seeds: 8

Events
| Singles | Doubles |
| ← 2013 · | Pan Pacific Open | · 2015 → |

The 2014 Toray Pan Pacific Open was a women's tennis tournament played on outdoor hard courts. It was the 31st edition of the Toray Pan Pacific Open, and part of the Premier Series of the 2014 WTA Tour. It took place at the Ariake Coliseum in Tokyo, Japan, on 15–21 September 2014. Ana Ivanovic won the singles title.

Petra Kvitová was the defending champion, but chose not to participate this year. Ana Ivanovic won the title, defeating Caroline Wozniacki in the final, 6–2, 7–6^{(7–2)}. This was Ivanovic's 15th and final title of her career.

== Seeds ==
The top four seeds received a bye into the second round.

1. (Germany) Angelique Kerber (semifinals)
2. (Denmark) Caroline Wozniacki (final)
3. (Serbia) Ana Ivanovic (champion)
4. (Serbia) Jelena Janković (second round)
5. (Italy) Sara Errani (first round)
6. (Slovakia) Dominika Cibulková (quarterfinals)
7. (Czech Republic) Lucie Šafářová (quarterfinals)
8. (Spain) Carla Suárez Navarro (quarterfinals)

== Draw ==
=== Key ===
- Q = Qualifier
- WC = Wild card
- LL = Lucky loser
- Alt = Alternate
- ITF = ITF entry
- PR = Protected ranking
- SR = Special ranking
- SE = Special exempt
- JE = Junior exempt
- JR = Junior Accelerator Programme entrant
- CO = College Accelerator Programme entrant
- NG = Next Gen Accelerator Program entrant
- w/o = Walkover
- r = Retired
- d = Defaulted

=== Finals ===
Semifinals
1 | (Germany) Angelique Kerber | 5 | 3
3 | (Serbia) Ana Ivanovic | 7 | 6
(Spain) Garbiñe Muguruza | 4 | 6 | 2
2 | (Denmark) Caroline Wozniacki | 6 | 2 | 6

Final
3 | (Serbia) Ana Ivanovic | 6 | 7^{7}
2 | (Denmark) Caroline Wozniacki | 2 | 6^{2}

=== Top half ===
First round
(Czech Republic) B Záhlavová-Strýcová | 4 | 1
(Ukraine) E Svitolina | 6 | 6
(United States) C Vandeweghe | 6 | 7
Q | (Russia) A Kudryavtseva | 2 | 5
(Belgium) K Flipkens | 1 | 3
6 | (Slovakia) D Cibulková | 6 | 6
(Belarus) V Azarenka | 3 | 6 | 6
WC | (Japan) K Date-Krumm | 6 | 0 | 2
(Russia) S Kuznetsova | 3 | 0
WC | (Switzerland) B Bencic | 6 | 6
(United States) M Keys | 7^{7} | 4 | 2
7 | (Czech Republic) L Šafářová | 6^{4} | 6 | 6

Second round
1 | (Germany) A Kerber | 6 | 6
(Ukraine) E Svitolina | 4 | 4
(United States) C Vandeweghe | 6^{5} | 5
6 | (Slovakia) D Cibulková | 7^{7} | 7
3 | (Serbia) A Ivanovic | 6 | 6
(Belarus) V Azarenka | 3 | 4
WC | (Switzerland) B Bencic | 6 | 4 | 2
7 | (Czech Republic) L Šafářová | 3 | 6 | 6

Quarterfinals
1 | (Germany) A Kerber | 6 | 6
6 | (Slovakia) D Cibulková | 3 | 0
3 | (Serbia) A Ivanovic | 6 | 6
7 | (Czech Republic) L Šafářová | 3 | 2

Semifinals
1 | (Germany) A Kerber | 5 | 3
3 | (Serbia) A Ivanovic | 7 | 6

=== Bottom half ===
First round
5 | (Italy) S Errani | 4 | 1
Q | (New Zealand) M Erakovic | 6 | 6
WC | (Germany) S Lisicki | 7^{7} | 5 | 2
(Australia) C Dellacqua | 6^{5} | 7 | 6
(Spain) G Muguruza | 6 | 7^{7}
(Russia) A Pavlyuchenkova | 3 | 6^{3}
8 | (Spain) C Suárez Navarro | 6 | 2 | 6
(Japan) K Nara | 1 | 6 | 2
(United States) L Davis | 6 | 4 | 4
Q | (Russia) D Gavrilova | 4 | 6 | 6
Q | (Australia) J Gajdošová | 6 | 5 | 7
(Slovakia) D Hantuchová | 2 | 7 | 5

Second round
Q | (New Zealand) M Erakovic | 2 | 4
(Australia) C Dellacqua | 6 | 6
(Spain) G Muguruza | 7^{7} | 6
4 | (Serbia) J Janković | 6^{4} | 4
8 | (Spain) C Suárez Navarro | 7^{7} | 6
Q | (Russia) D Gavrilova | 6^{5} | 3
Q | (Australia) J Gajdošová | 6 | 5 | 3
2 | (Denmark) C Wozniacki | 4 | 7 | 6

Quarterfinals
(Australia) C Dellacqua | 6 | 6^{5} | 3
(Spain) G Muguruza | 3 | 7^{7} | 6
8 | (Spain) C Suárez Navarro | 3 | 3
2 | (Denmark) C Wozniacki | 6 | 6

Semifinals
(Spain) G Muguruza | 4 | 6 | 2
2 | (Denmark) C Wozniacki | 6 | 2 | 6

== Qualifying ==
=== Seeds ===
1. (United States) CoCo Vandeweghe (moved to main draw)
2. (New Zealand) Marina Erakovic (qualified)
3. (Australia) Jarmila Gajdošová (qualified)
4. (Russia) Alla Kudryavtseva (qualified)
5. (United States) Taylor Townsend (second round)
6. (Croatia) Ana Konjuh (first round)
7. (Japan) Misa Eguchi (qualifying competition)
8. (Japan) Eri Hozumi (qualifying competition)
9. (Australia) Anastasia Rodionova (qualifying competition)

=== Qualifiers ===
1. (Russia) Daria Gavrilova
2. (New Zealand) Marina Erakovic
3. (Australia) Jarmila Gajdošová
4. (Russia) Alla Kudryavtseva

=== Draw ===
==== First qualifier ====
First round
9 | (Australia) Anastasia Rodionova | 6 | 4 | 7
(Japan) Nao Hibino | 3 | 6 | 5
(Japan) Miyu Kato | 3 | 0^{r}
(Japan) Riko Sawayanagi | 6 | 4
(Russia) Daria Gavrilova | 6 | 6
(Japan) Mari Tanaka | 2 | 2
WC | (Japan) Chiaki Okadaue | 1 | 4
5 | (United States) Taylor Townsend | 6 | 6

Second round
9 | (Australia) Anastasia Rodionova | 6^{4} | 6 | 6
(Japan) Riko Sawayanagi | 7^{7} | 4 | 0
(Russia) Daria Gavrilova | 6 | 6
5 | (United States) Taylor Townsend | 1 | 4

Qualifying competition
9 | (Australia) Anastasia Rodionova | 2 | 6 | 4
(Russia) Daria Gavrilova | 6 | 2 | 6

==== Second qualifier ====
First round
2 | (New Zealand) Marina Erakovic | 6 | 6
(Serbia) Doroteja Erić | 2 | 1
WC | (Japan) Miki Miyamura | 2 | 1
(France) Irena Pavlovic | 6 | 6
(Japan) Miyabi Inoue | 2 | 4
(Japan) Junri Namigata | 6 | 6
(Japan) Risa Ozaki | 6 | 6
6 | (Croatia) Ana Konjuh | 4 | 3

Second round
2 | (New Zealand) Marina Erakovic | 6 | 6
(France) Irena Pavlovic | 0 | 3
(Japan) Junri Namigata | 6 | 6
(Japan) Risa Ozaki | 2 | 2

Qualifying competition
2 | (New Zealand) Marina Erakovic | 6 | 6
(Japan) Junri Namigata | 1 | 1

==== Third qualifier ====
First round
3 | (Australia) Jarmila Gajdošová | 6 | 6
(United States) Raquel Kops-Jones | 2 | 4
Alt | (Poland) Alicja Rosolska | 3 | 0
(Japan) Miharu Imanishi | 6 | 6
(Japan) Naomi Osaka | 4 | 4
(Japan) Shuko Aoyama | 6 | 6
(United Kingdom) Emily Webley-Smith | 2 | 4
7 | (Japan) Misa Eguchi | 6 | 6

Second round
3 | (Australia) Jarmila Gajdošová | 3 | 6 | 6
(Japan) Miharu Imanishi | 6 | 3 | 2
(Japan) Shuko Aoyama | 6 | 4 | 1
7 | (Japan) Misa Eguchi | 3 | 6 | 6

Qualifying competition
3 | (Australia) Jarmila Gajdošová | 6 | 6
7 | (Japan) Misa Eguchi | 4 | 4

==== Fourth qualifier ====
First round
4 | (Russia) Alla Kudryavtseva | 6 | 7^{8}
(Spain) Arantxa Parra Santonja | 3 | 6^{6}
(Japan) Rika Fujiwara | 7 | 1 | 6
WC | (Japan) Mari Osaka | 5 | 6 | 3
Alt | (United States) Abigail Spears | 6 | 7
(Japan) Yurika Sema | 1 | 5
WC | (Japan) Hikari Yamamoto | 2 | 2
8 | (Japan) Eri Hozumi | 6 | 6

Second round
4 | (Russia) Alla Kudryavtseva | 7 | 6
(Japan) Rika Fujiwara | 5 | 0
Alt | (United States) Abigail Spears | 2 | 6 | 3
8 | (Japan) Eri Hozumi | 6 | 4 | 6

Qualifying competition
4 | (Russia) Alla Kudryavtseva | 6 | 6
8 | (Japan) Eri Hozumi | 2 | 2
