= Gil Reyes =

Gil Reyes may refer to:

- Gil Reyes (boxer), American boxer
- Gil Reyes (tennis), American fitness trainer

== See also ==
- Gilberto Reyes, baseball player
