= 2014 Toray Pan Pacific Open – Doubles =

Doubles
- 2014 Toray Pan Pacific Open

Final
- Champions: (Zimbabwe) Cara Black (India) Sania Mirza
- Runners-up: (Spain) Garbiñe Muguruza (Spain) Carla Suárez Navarro
- Score: 6–2, 7–5

Details
- Draw: 16
- Seeds: 4

Events
| Singles | Doubles |
| ← 2013 · | Toray Pan Pacific Open | · 2015 → |

Cara Black and Sania Mirza were the defending champions and successfully defended their title, defeating Garbiñe Muguruza and Carla Suárez Navarro in the final, 6–2, 7–5.

== Seeds ==
1. (Zimbabwe) Cara Black / (India) Sania Mirza (champions)
2. (United States) Raquel Kops-Jones / (United States) Abigail Spears (semifinals)
3. (Russia) Alla Kudryavtseva / (Australia) Anastasia Rodionova (quarterfinals)
4. (Spain) Garbiñe Muguruza / (Spain) Carla Suárez Navarro (final)

== Draw ==
=== Key ===
- Q = Qualifier
- WC = Wild card
- LL = Lucky loser
- Alt = Alternate
- ITF = ITF entry
- PR = Protected ranking
- SR = Special ranking
- SE = Special exempt
- JE = Junior exempt
- JR = Junior Accelerator Programme entrant
- CO = College Accelerator Programme entrant
- NG = Next Gen Accelerator Program entrant
- w/o = Walkover
- r = Retired
- d = Defaulted

=== Draw ===
First round
1 | (Zimbabwe) C Black (India) S Mirza | 6 | 3 | [10]
(Australia) C Dellacqua (United States) L Raymond | 3 | 6 | [8]
(Switzerland) B Bencic (Switzerland) M Hingis | 6 | 6
(Japan) R Fujiwara (Chinese Taipei) S-y Hsieh | 4 | 2
3 | (Russia) A Kudryavtseva (Australia) An Rodionova | 2 | 6 | [10]
(Japan) M Miyamura (Japan) J Namigata | 6 | 3 | [2]
(Poland) A Rosolska (Ukraine) O Savchuk | 2 | 0
(Serbia) J Janković (Spain) A Parra Santonja | 6 | 6
(Australia) J Gajdošová (Australia) Ar Rodionova | 6 | 6
WC | (Japan) Y Sema (Japan) M Tanaka | 3 | 3
(Russia) A Pavlyuchenkova (Czech Republic) L Šafářová | 3 | 6 | [7]
4 | (Spain) G Muguruza (Spain) C Suárez Navarro | 6 | 4 | [10]
WC | (Slovakia) D Cibulková (Belgium) K Flipkens | 6 | 7
(Japan) K Date-Krumm (Czech Republic) B Záhlavová-Strýcová | 3 | 5
(Japan) S Aoyama (Japan) K Nara | 1 | 3
2 | (United States) R Kops-Jones (United States) A Spears | 6 | 6

Quarterfinals
1 | (Zimbabwe) C Black (India) S Mirza | 6 | 6
(Switzerland) B Bencic (Switzerland) M Hingis | 4 | 2
3 | (Russia) A Kudryavtseva (Australia) An Rodionova | 6 | 3 | [6]
(Serbia) J Janković (Spain) A Parra Santonja | 2 | 6 | [10]
(Australia) J Gajdošová (Australia) Ar Rodionova | 5 | 6 | [4]
4 | (Spain) G Muguruza (Spain) C Suárez Navarro | 7 | 4 | [10]
WC | (Slovakia) D Cibulková (Belgium) K Flipkens | 3 | 6 | [11]
2 | (United States) R Kops-Jones (United States) A Spears | 6 | 4 | [13]

Semifinals
1 | (Zimbabwe) C Black (India) S Mirza | 6 | 6
(Serbia) J Janković (Spain) A Parra Santonja | 3 | 2
4 | (Spain) G Muguruza (Spain) C Suárez Navarro | 6 | 6
2 | (United States) R Kops-Jones (United States) A Spears | 4 | 3

Final
1 | (Zimbabwe) C Black (India) S Mirza | 6 | 7
4 | (Spain) G Muguruza (Spain) C Suárez Navarro | 2 | 5
