= 2015 Toray Pan Pacific Open – Singles =

Singles
- 2015 Toray Pan Pacific Open

Final
- Champion: (Poland) Agnieszka Radwańska
- Runner-up: (Switzerland) Belinda Bencic
- Score: 6–2, 6–2

Details
- Draw: 28 (4 Q / 2 WC )
- Seeds: 8

Events
Singles	Doubles
- Pan Pacific Open

Ana Ivanovic was the defending champion, but she lost in the quarterfinals to Dominika Cibulková.

Agnieszka Radwańska won the title, defeating Belinda Bencic in the final, 6–2, 6–2.

== Seeds ==
The top four seeds received a bye into the second round.

1. (Denmark) Caroline Wozniacki (semifinals)
2. (Serbia) Ana Ivanovic (quarterfinals)
3. (Spain) Garbiñe Muguruza (quarterfinals)
4. (Czech Republic) Karolína Plíšková (quarterfinals)
5. (Germany) Angelique Kerber (quarterfinals)
6. (Spain) Carla Suárez Navarro (second round)
7. (Poland) Agnieszka Radwańska (champion)
8. (Switzerland) Belinda Bencic (final)

== Draw ==
Key

- Q = Qualifier
- WC = Wild card
- LL = Lucky loser
- Alt = Alternate
- ITF = ITF entry
- PR = Protected ranking
- SR = Special ranking
- SE = Special exempt
- JE = Junior exempt
- JR = Junior Accelerator Programme entrant
- CO = College Accelerator Programme entrant
- NG = Next Gen Accelerator Program entrant
- w/o = Walkover
- r = Retired
- d = Defaulted

=== Finals ===
Semifinals
1	(Denmark) Caroline Wozniacki	2	4
8	(Switzerland) Belinda Bencic	6	6
7	(Poland) Agnieszka Radwańska	6	6
(Slovakia) Dominika Cibulková	4	1

Final
8	(Switzerland) Belinda Bencic	2	2
7	(Poland) Agnieszka Radwańska	6	6

=== Top half ===
First round
Q	(Croatia) A Konjuh	6	3	6
(France) K Mladenovic	0	6	3
(Kazakhstan) Z Diyas	2	2
(United States) M Brengle	6	6
(Russia) D Gavrilova	2	2
5	(Germany) A Kerber	6	6
(Czech Republic) B Strýcová	7	6
WC	(Japan) N Osaka	5	2
(United States) A Riske	6	1	3
(Australia) S Stosur	4	6	6
Q	(China) Y Xu	0	0
8	(Switzerland) B Bencic	6	6

Second round
1	(Denmark) C Wozniacki	6	6
Q	(Croatia) A Konjuh	2	2
(United States) M Brengle	7	1	0
5	(Germany) A Kerber	5	6	6
3	(Spain) G Muguruza	6	6
(Czech Republic) B Strýcová	3	4
(Australia) S Stosur	7^{7}	3	4
8	(Switzerland) B Bencic	6^{5}	6	6

Quarterfinals
1	(Denmark) C Wozniacki	6	2	6
5	(Germany) A Kerber	2	6	3
3	(Spain) G Muguruza	6^{1}	1
8	(Switzerland) B Bencic	7^{7}	6

Semifinals
1	(Denmark) C Wozniacki	2	4
8	(Switzerland) B Bencic	6	6

=== Bottom half ===
First round
7	(Poland) A Radwańska	6	6
(United States) C Vandeweghe	3	3
Q	(Ukraine) O Savchuk	2	0
(Ukraine) E Svitolina	6	6
(Japan) K Nara	7^{7}	6
WC	(Japan) M Doi	6^{1}	2
6	(Spain) C Suárez Navarro	7^{7}	6
Q	(Ukraine) K Bondarenko	6^{3}	2
(Croatia) M Lučić-Baroni	4	0^{r}
(Slovakia) D Cibulková	6	1
(Italy) C Giorgi	4	7^{7}	6
(France) C Garcia	6	6^{3}	3

Second round
7	(Poland) A Radwańska	6	6
(Ukraine) E Svitolina	4	1
(Japan) K Nara	2	4
4	(Czech Republic) Ka Plíšková	6	6
6	(Spain) C Suárez Navarro	4	4
(Slovakia) D Cibulková	6	6
(Italy) C Giorgi	5	2
2	(Serbia) A Ivanovic	7	6

Quarterfinals
7	(Poland) A Radwańska	7	6
4	(Czech Republic) Ka Plíšková	5	2
(Slovakia) D Cibulková	7^{7}	6
2	(Serbia) A Ivanovic	6^{5}	3

Semifinals
7	(Poland) A Radwańska	6	6
(Slovakia) D Cibulková	4	1

== Qualifying ==
=== Seeds ===
1. (Croatia) Ana Konjuh (qualified)
2. (Australia) Jarmila Gajdošová (qualifying competition)
3. (Ukraine) Kateryna Bondarenko (qualified)
4. (Bulgaria) Sesil Karatantcheva (second round)
5. (Romania) Patricia Maria Țig (second round)
6. (Japan) Nao Hibino (qualifying competition)
7. (Switzerland) Stefanie Vögele (second round)
8. (Japan) Risa Ozaki (qualifying competition)

=== Qualifiers ===
1. (Croatia) Ana Konjuh
2. (China) Xu Yifan
3. (Ukraine) Kateryna Bondarenko
4. (Ukraine) Olga Savchuk

=== Qualifying draw ===
==== First qualifier ====
First round
1	(Croatia) Ana Konjuh	6	5
(Russia) Anastasia Pivovarova	3	5^{r}
(Japan) Riko Sawayanagi	6	6
WC	(Japan) Eri Shimizu	3	1
(Japan) Miyabi Inoue	4	6	6
WC	(Japan) Megumi Nishimoto	6	0	1
(Japan) Eri Hozumi	3	3
8	(Japan) Risa Ozaki	6	6

Second round
1	(Croatia) Ana Konjuh	6	6
(Japan) Riko Sawayanagi	1	4
(Japan) Miyabi Inoue	5	3
8	(Japan) Risa Ozaki	7	6

Qualifying competition
1	(Croatia) Ana Konjuh	6	6
8	(Japan) Risa Ozaki	4	0

==== Second qualifier ====
First round
2	(Australia) Jarmila Gajdošová	4	6	6
(China) Han Xinyun	6	2	1
WC	(Japan) Sachie Ishizu	6	7
(Croatia) Darija Jurak	4	5
(Poland) Alicja Rosolska	1	3
(China) Xu Yifan	6	6
WC	(Japan) Mayu Iwai	4	0
5	(Romania) Patricia Maria Țig	6	6

Second round
2	(Australia) Jarmila Gajdošová	4	6	6
WC	(Japan) Sachie Ishizu	6	1	1
(China) Xu Yifan	6	6
5	(Romania) Patricia Maria Țig	4	2

Qualifying competition
2	(Australia) Jarmila Gajdošová	6	4	6^{4}
(China) Xu Yifan	3	6	7^{7}

==== Third qualifier ====
First round
3	(Ukraine) Kateryna Bondarenko	7^{7}	7
WC	(Japan) Chihiro Muramatsu	6^{5}	5
(Spain) Sara Sorribes Tormo	7^{7}	4	7
(Canada) Gabriela Dabrowski	6^{4}	6	5
(United States) Abigail Spears	6^{4}	6^{3}
(Chinese Taipei) Chang Kai-chen	7^{7}	7^{7}
(Japan) Miyu Kato	2	2
6	(Japan) Nao Hibino	6	6

Second round
3	(Ukraine) Kateryna Bondarenko	6	6
(Spain) Sara Sorribes Tormo	3	2
(Chinese Taipei) Chang Kai-chen	0	3
6	(Japan) Nao Hibino	6	6

Qualifying competition
3	(Ukraine) Kateryna Bondarenko	6	6
6	(Japan) Nao Hibino	3	4

==== Fourth qualifier ====
First round
4	(Bulgaria) Sesil Karatantcheva	6	6
(Japan) Kyōka Okamura	3	4
(United States) Raquel Kops-Jones	6^{2}	0
(Ukraine) Olga Savchuk	7^{7}	6
(Japan) Erika Sema	4	6^{2}
(Japan) Misa Eguchi	6	7^{7}
(Japan) Junri Namigata	6	2	5
7	(Switzerland) Stefanie Vögele	2	6	7

Second round
4	(Bulgaria) Sesil Karatantcheva	1	2
(Ukraine) Olga Savchuk	6	6
(Japan) Misa Eguchi	6	7
7	(Switzerland) Stefanie Vögele	3	5

Qualifying competition
(Ukraine) Olga Savchuk	6	6
(Japan) Misa Eguchi	3	4
