= 2015 Toray Pan Pacific Open =

- Date: 21–27 September 2015
- Edition: 32nd
- Category: WTA Premier
- Draw: 28S / 16D
- Prize money: $1,000,000
- Surface: Hard / outdoor
- Location: Tokyo, Japan
- Venue: Ariake Forest Park

Champions

Singles
- (Poland) Agnieszka Radwańska

Doubles
- (Spain) Garbiñe Muguruza / (Spain) Carla Suárez Navarro
← 2014 ·	Pan Pacific Open	· 2016 →

The 2015 Toray Pan Pacific Open was a women's tennis tournament played on outdoor hard courts. It was the 32nd edition of the Pan Pacific Open, and part of the Premier Series of the 2015 WTA Tour. It took place at the Ariake Coliseum in Tokyo, Japan, on 21–27 September 2015. Seventh-seeded Agnieszka Radwańska won the singles title.

== Finals ==
=== Singles ===
- (Poland) Agnieszka Radwańska defeated (Switzerland) Belinda Bencic, 6–2, 6–2

=== Doubles ===
- (Spain) Garbiñe Muguruza / (Spain) Carla Suárez Navarro defeated (Chinese Taipei) Chan Hao-ching / (Chinese Taipei) Chan Yung-jan, 7–5, 6–1

== Points and prize money ==
=== Point distribution ===
Event	W	F	SF	QF	Round of 16	Round of 32	Q	Q3	Q2	Q1
Singles	470	305	185	100	55	1	25	18	13	1
Doubles	470	305	185	100	1	—	—	—	—	—

=== Prize money ===
Event	W	F	SF	QF	Round of 16	Round of 32^{*}	Q3	Q2	Q1
Singles	$195,092	$104,470	$55,798	$22,146	$11,894	$7,550	$3,369	$1,800	$1,000
Doubles	$45,302	$23,988	$13,196	$6,720	$3,646	—	—	—	—
Doubles prize money per team

^* Qualifiers prize money is also the round of 32 prize money

== Singles main-draw entrants ==
=== Seeds ===
Country	Player	Ranking	Seeds
DEN	Caroline Wozniacki	6	1
SRB	Ana Ivanovic	7	2
ESP	Garbiñe Muguruza	9	3
CZE	Karolína Plíšková	10	4
GER	Angelique Kerber	11	5
ESP	Carla Suárez Navarro	12	6
POL	Agnieszka Radwańska	14	7
SUI	Belinda Bencic	15	8

- Rankings are as of September 14, 2015

=== Other entrants ===
The following players received wild cards into the main singles draw:

- (Japan) Misaki Doi
- (Japan) Naomi Osaka

The following players received entry from the singles qualifying draw:

- (Ukraine) Kateryna Bondarenko
- (Croatia) Ana Konjuh
- (Ukraine) Olga Savchuk
- (China) Xu Yifan

=== Withdrawals ===
Before the tournament

- (Canada) Eugenie Bouchard →replaced by Alison Riske
- (Russia) Anastasia Pavlyuchenkova →replaced by Madison Brengle
- (Czech Republic) Lucie Šafářová →replaced by CoCo Vandeweghe

=== Retirements ===
- (Croatia) Mirjana Lučić-Baroni

== Doubles main-draw entrants ==
=== Seeds ===
Country	Player	Country	Player	Rank^{1}	Seed
USA	Raquel Kops-Jones	USA	Abigail Spears	30	1
TPE	Chan Yung-jan	TPE	Chan Hao-ching	35	2
ESP	Garbiñe Muguruza	ESP	Carla Suárez Navarro	42	3
~~SUI~~	~~Belinda Bencic~~	~~FRA~~	~~Kristina Mladenovic~~	~~78~~	~~4~~

- Rankings are as of September 14, 2015

=== Other entrants ===
The following pair received a wildcard into the doubles main draw:

- (Japan) Misaki Doi / (Japan) Kurumi Nara

=== Withdrawals ===
Before the tournament

- (Switzerland) Belinda Bencic (viral illness)

During the tournament

- (Slovakia) Dominika Cibulková (gastrointestinal illness)
