= 2015 Toray Pan Pacific Open – Doubles =

Doubles
- 2015 Toray Pan Pacific Open

Final
- Champions: (Spain) Garbiñe Muguruza (Spain) Carla Suárez Navarro
- Runners-up: (Chinese Taipei) Chan Hao-ching (Chinese Taipei) Chan Yung-jan
- Score: 7–5, 6–1

Details
- Draw: 16
- Seeds: 4

Events
Singles	Doubles
← 2014 ·	Toray Pan Pacific Open	· 2016 →

Cara Black and Sania Mirza were the defending champions but they chose not to participate.
Garbiñe Muguruza and Carla Suárez Navarro won the title, defeating Chan Hao-ching and Chan Yung-jan in the final, 7–5, 6–1.

== Seeds ==
1. (United States) Raquel Kops-Jones / (United States) Abigail Spears (first round)
2. (Chinese Taipei) Chan Hao-ching / (Chinese Taipei) Chan Yung-jan (final)
3. (Spain) Garbiñe Muguruza / (Spain) Carla Suárez Navarro (champions)
4. (Switzerland) Belinda Bencic / (France) Kristina Mladenovic (first round, withdrew)

== Draw ==
=== Key ===
- Q = Qualifier
- WC = Wild card
- LL = Lucky loser
- Alt = Alternate
- ITF = ITF entry
- PR = Protected ranking
- SR = Special ranking
- SE = Special exempt
- JE = Junior exempt
- JR = Junior Accelerator Programme entrant
- CO = College Accelerator Programme entrant
- NG = Next Gen Accelerator Program entrant
- w/o = Walkover
- r = Retired
- d = Defaulted

First round
1	(United States) R Kops-Jones (United States) A Spears	5	4
WC	(Japan) K Nara (Japan) M Doi	7	6
(Ukraine) K Bondarenko (Chinese Taipei) C-j Chuang	6	7^{8}
(Canada) G Dabrowski (Poland) A Rosolska	2	6^{6}
3	(Spain) G Muguruza (Spain) C Suárez Navarro	7^{10}	6
(Chinese Taipei) K-c Chang (China) X Han	6^{8}	3
(Slovakia) D Cibulková (Czech Republic) B Strýcová	7	6
(Chinese Taipei) C-w Chan (Croatia) D Jurak	5	4
(Japan) M Inoue (Japan) K Okamura	6	4	[7]
(Japan) E Hozumi (Japan) M Kato	3	6	[10]
(Japan) M Eguchi (Japan) J Namigata	w/o
4	(Switzerland) B Bencic (France) K Mladenovic
(Russia) D Gavrilova (Ukraine) E Svitolina	7	2	[8]
(Ukraine) O Savchuk (China) Y Xu	5	6	[10]
(Germany) A-L Grönefeld (United States) C Vandeweghe	1	6	7
2	(Chinese Taipei) H-c Chan (Chinese Taipei) Y-j Chan	6	4	[10]

Quarterfinals
WC	(Japan) K Nara (Japan) M Doi	3	4
(Ukraine) K Bondarenko (Chinese Taipei) C-j Chuang	6	6
3	(Spain) G Muguruza (Spain) C Suárez Navarro	w/o
(Slovakia) D Cibulková (Czech Republic) B Strýcová
(Japan) E Hozumi (Japan) M Kato	6	4	[12]
(Japan) M Eguchi (Japan) J Namigata	4	6	[10]
(Ukraine) O Savchuk (China) Y Xu	1	6	[8]
2	(Chinese Taipei) H-c Chan (Chinese Taipei) Y-j Chan	6	2	[10]

Semifinals
(Ukraine) K Bondarenko (Chinese Taipei) C-j Chuang	6	3	[5]
3	(Spain) G Muguruza (Spain) C Suárez Navarro	3	6	[10]
(Japan) E Hozumi (Japan) M Kato	4	5
2	(Chinese Taipei) H-c Chan (Chinese Taipei) Y-j Chan	6	7

Final
3	(Spain) G Muguruza (Spain) C Suárez Navarro	7	6
2	(Chinese Taipei) H-c Chan (Chinese Taipei) Y-j Chan	5	1
