= 2014 Toray Pan Pacific Open =

- Date: 15–21 September
- Edition: 31st
- Category: WTA Premier
- Prize money: $1,000,000
- Surface: Hard / outdoor
- Location: Tokyo, Japan
- Venue: Ariake Coliseum

Champions

Singles
- (Serbia) Ana Ivanovic

Doubles
- (Zimbabwe) Cara Black / (India) Sania Mirza
← 2013 ·	Pan Pacific Open	· 2015 →

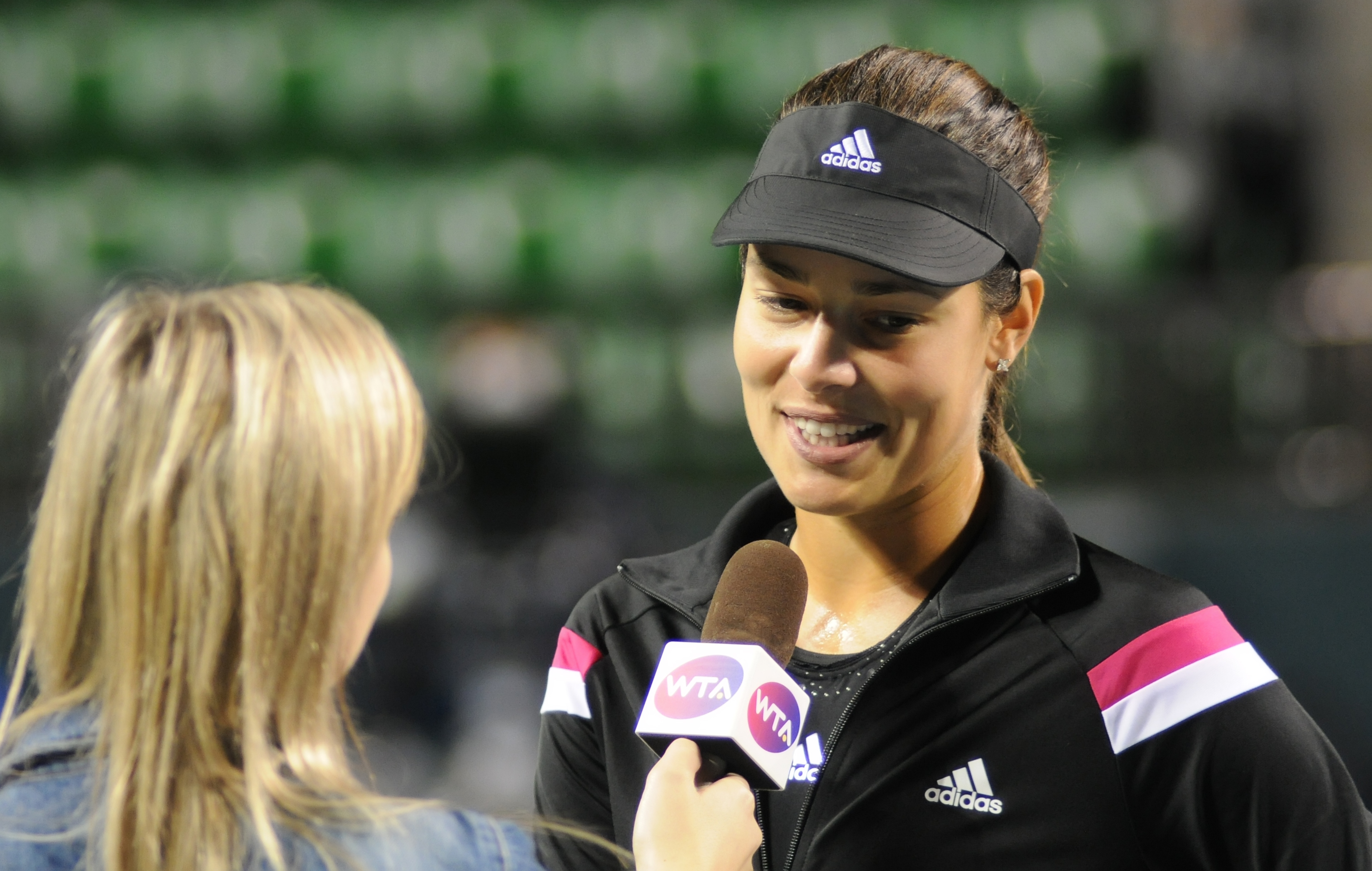
Ana Ivanovic, the 2014 Toray Pan Pacific Open champion in singles

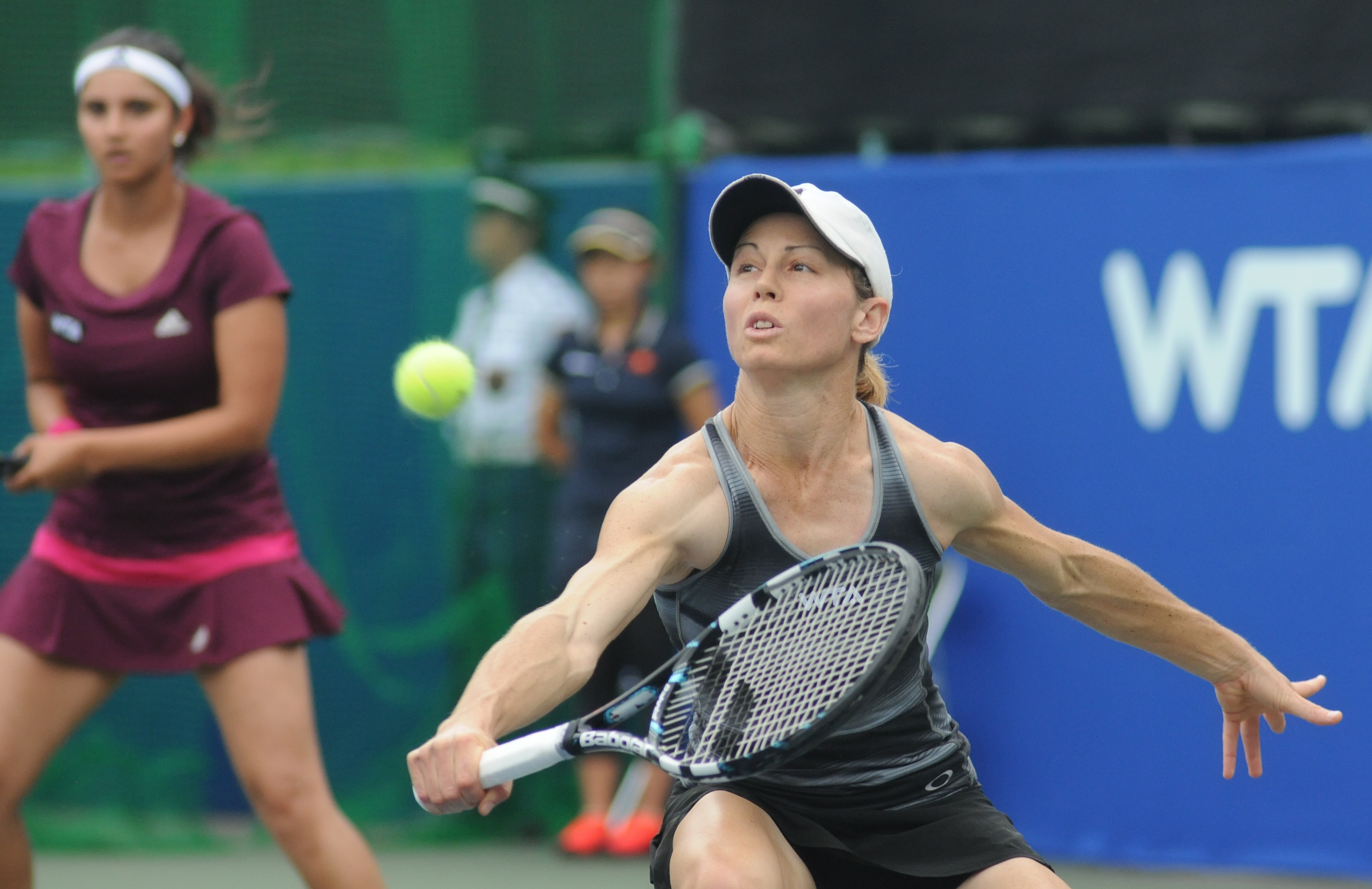
Cara Black (foreground) and Sania Mirza (background), the 2014 Toray Pan Pacific Open champions in doubles

The 2014 Toray Pan Pacific Open was a women's tennis tournament played on outdoor hard courts. It was the 31st edition of the Toray Pan Pacific Open, and part of the Premier Series of the 2014 WTA Tour. It took place at the Ariake Coliseum in Tokyo, Japan, on 15–21 September 2014. Third-seeded Ana Ivanovic won the singles title.

== Finals ==
=== Singles ===
- (Serbia) Ana Ivanovic defeated (Denmark) Caroline Wozniacki 6–2, 7–6^{(7–2)}

=== Doubles ===
- (Zimbabwe) Cara Black / (India) Sania Mirza defeated (Spain) Garbiñe Muguruza / (Spain) Carla Suárez Navarro 6–2, 7–5

== Singles entrants ==
=== Seeds ===
Country	Player	Rank^{1}	Seed
GER	Angelique Kerber	8	1
DEN	Caroline Wozniacki	9	2
SRB	Ana Ivanovic	10	3
SRB	Jelena Janković	11	4
ITA	Sara Errani	12	5
SVK	Dominika Cibulková	13	6
CZE	Lucie Šafářová	15	7
ESP	Carla Suárez Navarro	18	8

- ^{1} Rankings as of 8 September 2014

=== Other entrants ===
The following players received wildcards into the singles main draw:

- (Switzerland) Belinda Bencic
- (Japan) Kimiko Date-Krumm
- (Germany) Sabine Lisicki

The following players received entry from the qualifying draw:

- (New Zealand) Marina Erakovic
- (Australia) Jarmila Gajdošová
- (Russia) Daria Gavrilova
- (Russia) Alla Kudryavtseva

=== Withdrawals ===
Before the tournament

- (Italy) Camila Giorgi → replaced by (Belgium) Kirsten Flipkens
- (Italy) Flavia Pennetta → replaced by (United States) Lauren Davis
- (Germany) Andrea Petkovic → replaced by (Ukraine) Elina Svitolina

== Doubles entrants ==
=== Seeds ===
Country	Player	Country	Player	Rank^{1}	Seed
ZIM	Cara Black	IND	Sania Mirza	14	1
USA	Raquel Kops-Jones	USA	Abigail Spears	22	2
RUS	Alla Kudryavtseva	AUS	Anastasia Rodionova	30	3
ESP	Garbiñe Muguruza	ESP	Carla Suárez Navarro	37	4

- ^{1} Rankings as of 8 September 2014

=== Other entrants ===
The following pairs received wildcards into the doubles main draw:

- (Slovakia) Dominika Cibulková / (Belgium) Kirsten Flipkens
- (Japan) Yurika Sema / (Japan) Mari Tanaka
