= Ana Ivanovic =

Serbian former tennis player (born 1987)

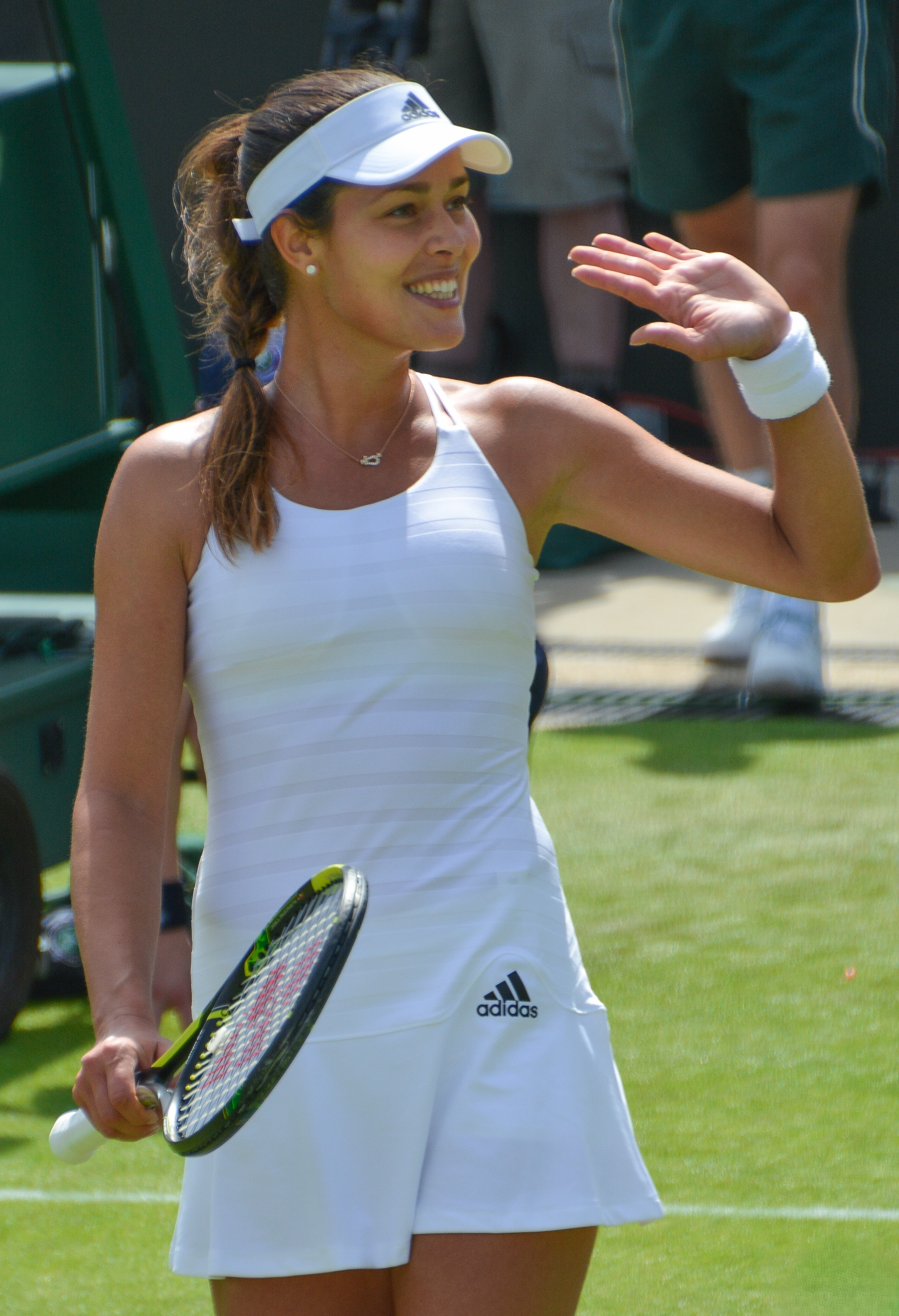
- Ivanovic in 2015
- Native name: Ана Ивановић; Ana Ivanović
- Country (sports): Serbia and Montenegro (2003–2006); Serbia (2006–2016)
- Born: 6 November 1987 (age 39) Belgrade, SR Serbia, Yugoslavia
- Height: 1.84 m (6 ft 0 in)
- Turned pro: 17 August 2003
- Retired: 28 December 2016
- Plays: Right-handed (two-handed backhand)
- Prize money: US$15,510,787: 41st in all-time rankings
- Official website: Official website

Singles
- Career record: 480–225
- Career titles: 15
- Highest ranking: No. 1 (9 June 2008)

Grand Slam singles results
- Australian Open: F (2008)
- French Open: W (2008)
- Wimbledon: SF (2007)
- US Open: QF (2012)

Other tournaments
- Tour Finals: SF (2007)
- Olympic Games: 3R (2012)

Doubles
- Career record: 30–35
- Career titles: 0
- Highest ranking: No. 50 (25 September 2006)

Grand Slam doubles results
- French Open: 1R (2005, 2007)
- Wimbledon: 3R (2005)
- US Open: 3R (2006)

Mixed doubles
- Career record: 2–3

Grand Slam mixed doubles results
- Australian Open: 2R (2006)
- French Open: 2R (2005)
- US Open: 1R (2011)

Other mixed doubles tournaments
- Olympic Games: 1R (2012)

Team competitions
- Fed Cup: F (2012), record 20–9
- Hopman Cup: F (2013)

Ana Ivanovic (Serbian: Ана Ивановић, romanized: Ana Ivanović; born 6 November 1987) is a Serbian former professional tennis player. She was ranked as the world No. 1 in women's singles by the Women's Tennis Association (WTA) for 12 weeks. Ivanovic won 15 WTA Tour-level singles titles, including a major at the 2008 French Open. She was also the runner-up at the 2007 French Open and the 2008 Australian Open. Ivanovic qualified for the year-end WTA Finals three times, and won the year-end WTA Tournament of Champions twice, in 2010 and 2011.

Ivanovic made her WTA Tour debut in 2004. By the age of 18, she had already defeated established players such as Svetlana Kuznetsova, Nadia Petrova, Vera Zvonareva and Amélie Mauresmo. At age 20, she achieved her career highlight by winning the 2008 French Open—becoming world No. 1 in the process. After her triumph, she struggled to maintain her newfound success, not reaching the quarterfinals of a major in her subsequent 17 appearances, and dropping as low as No. 65 in the rankings in July 2010. In 2012, Ivanovic resurged by reaching the US Open quarterfinals, and finishing the year inside the top 15. In 2014, she returned to the top of the game—winning four titles, qualifying for the WTA Finals, and was the year-end world No. 5. She continued this success in 2015 by reaching her first major semifinal in seven years at the French Open. In December 2016, Ivanovic announced her retirement from the sport.

Ivanovic was known for her aggressive style of play and impressive forehand, which was described by Nadia Petrova as "the best out there." She earned over $15.5 million in prize money. In June 2011, she was named one of the "30 Legends of Women's Tennis: Past, Present and Future" by Time and was also included on the list of "Top 100 Greatest Players Ever" (male and female combined) by reporter Matthew Cronin.

== Early life ==
Ivanovic (Ана Ивановић / Ana Ivanović, pronounced [âna ǐʋanoʋitɕ, ǎː-]) was born in Belgrade, SFR Yugoslavia. Her mother, Dragana, a lawyer, has been court-side during most of her matches. Her father Miroslav, a self-employed businessman, attended as many events as he possibly could. Ivanovic has a younger brother, Miloš, with whom she loved to play basketball.

Ivanovic began playing tennis at the age of five after watching Monica Seles, a fellow Yugoslav, on television. She started her career after memorizing the telephone number of a local tennis clinic from an advertisement. During the NATO bombing of Yugoslavia, she was forced to train during the morning to avoid bombardments. She trained in an abandoned swimming pool in the winter, as no tennis facilities were available. At 13 she moved to Basel, Switzerland due to the better training facilities and coaching available. Manager Dan Holzmann was living in Basel, and Ana and her mother moved to Switzerland when she signed an agreement with the Swiss entrepreneur.

When she was 15, Ivanovic spent four hours in a locker room crying after a defeat – the first that her new manager had witnessed. She thought that Dan Holzmann would abandon her, thinking she wouldn't be good enough to become a professional tennis player. However, he remained her manager throughout her career.

== Career ==
=== 2004: Rising star ===
Ivanovic reached the final of the Junior Wimbledon tournament, losing to Kateryna Bondarenko. In 2004, she went 26–0 on the ITF Women's Circuit, and won all five events that she entered, two of them as a qualifier. As a qualifier in Zurich, she overcame a 5–1 third-set deficit along with two match points to defeat world No. 29 Tatiana Golovin. She then debuted in the qualifying draw of a major at the US Open, where she was defeated by Lioudmila Skavronskaia after winning the first set 6–1 and having two match points in the third set. Her first notable breakthrough occurred in the next tournament, when she took Venus Williams to two tiebreaks, before losing in straight sets in the second round of the Zurich Open. She had held several set points in both sets. She followed up her run in Zurich with a quarterfinal showing at Luxembourg the next week.

=== 2005: First WTA title ===
As a qualifier, Ivanovic won her first career singles title early in the year at the Canberra International, after defeating Melinda Czink in the final. Her ranking continued to rise after wins over Svetlana Kuznetsova in Miami, Nadia Petrova also in Miami, and Vera Zvonareva in Warsaw, all of whom were top-10 players. Ivanovic lost to Amélie Mauresmo at the Australian Open in the third round, at Doha in the third round after holding a 6–2, 2–0 lead, and at the Miami Masters in the quarterfinals. However, Ivanovic's biggest win to date then came over Mauresmo in the third round of the French Open. She advanced to the quarterfinals of only her second Grand Slam tournament by defeating Francesca Schiavone in the fourth round. Later in the year, Ivanovic reached the semifinals of the Zurich Open and Generali Ladies Linz, losing to Patty Schnyder in both tournaments. She finished the year ranked No. 16.

=== 2006: Breakthrough ===
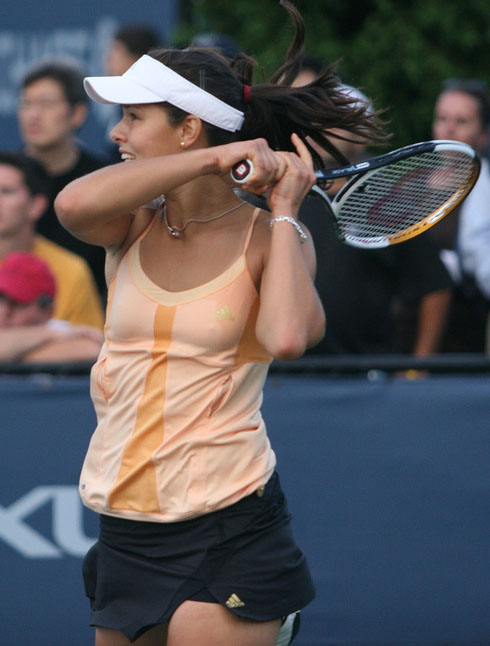
Ivanovic at the 2006 US Open

Ivanovic started the season at the Hopman Cup in Perth, Western Australia with fellow Serbian Novak Djokovic, where the pair narrowly missed the final. To start off her WTA year, she played at the Medibank International in Sydney where she once again defeated Amélie Mauresmo, this time in straight sets, before falling to Svetlana Kuznetsova in the quarterfinals. A week later, she lost to Samantha Stosur in the second round of the Australian Open.

Ivanovic made it to the third round of the French Open, before losing to Anastasia Myskina. She progressed to the fourth round at Wimbledon, but lost to eventual champion and world No. 1, Amélie Mauresmo, in straight sets after beating No. 14 seed, Dinara Safina.

Ivanovic made her breakthrough in August by defeating a formerly ranked No. 1, Martina Hingis, in the final of the Rogers Cup in Montreal adter beating Jelena Janković, No. 14 seed Katarina Srebotnik and top-10 player Dinara Safina en route to the championship match. This ultimately led to her winning the United States Open Series, ahead of Kim Clijsters and Maria Sharapova. At the US Open, she lost to Serena Williams.

Ivanovic also played nine tournaments in doubles in 2006, teaming up with Maria Kirilenko and Sania Mirza. Ivanovic and Kirilenko made two semifinals and a final; they ended the year at No. 17 in the annual race to the Championships. Ivanovic finished the year ranked world No. 14 in singles and No. 51 in doubles.

=== 2007: First Grand Slam final and entering the top 10 ===
Ivanovic started the season in Gold Coast and Sydney where she reached quarterfinals. Seeded 13th at the Australian Open, Ivanovic defeated Agnieszka Radwańska in the second round, but lost in the third round to Vera Zvonareva. Immediately after this tournament, she announced that she had split with her coach David Taylor. She then played in the Toray Pan Pacific Open. In the quarterfinals she beat No. 10 Janković, and in the semifinals the No. 1, when Maria Sharapova was forced to retire after Ivanovic had won the first set; but she lost in the final to Martina Hingis.

During the American hard-court season, Ivanovic lost in early rounds. But on clay, she first went on to semifinal of Amelia Island and then managed to win her first Tier-I clay-court title in Berlin, defeating No. 4 Svetlana Kuznetsova in the final in three sets. Ivanovic needed a tiebreak to finally finish the match. The win in Berlin propelled her into the top ten of the WTA rankings for the first time, at world No. 8.

Ivanovic had a six-match winning streak heading into the French Open and increased this streak to twelve by reaching the final. She won her first three matches with the loss of only nine games. In her second career quarterfinal at the French Open, Ivanovic defeated world No. 3 Kuznetsova, and she then beat world No. 2, Sharapova, in less than one hour in the semifinals. In the final, Ivanovic attempted to win her first major singles title and complete a sweep of the top three players in the world. However, world No. 1 and two-time defending champion Justine Henin won the match in straight sets.

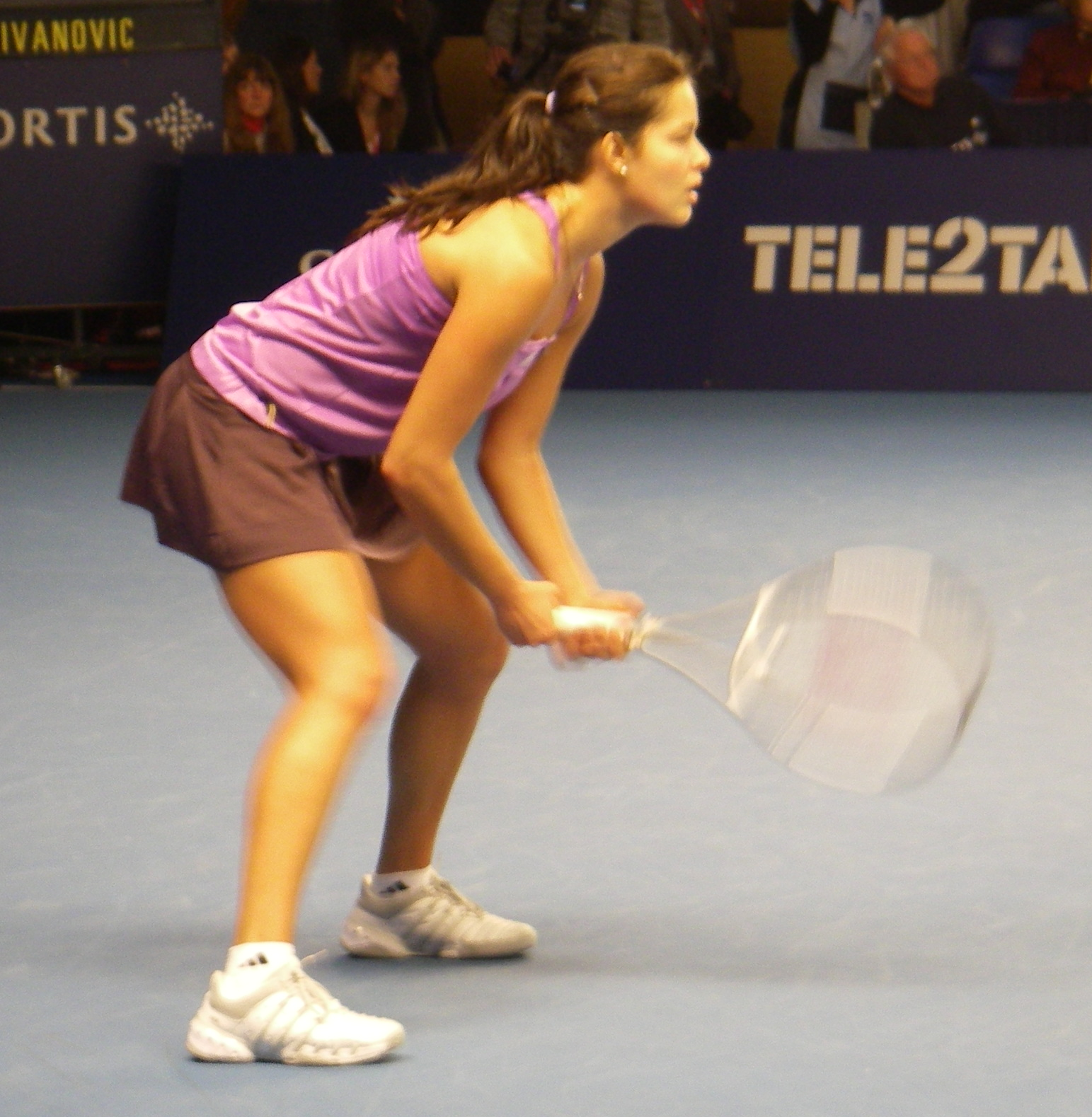
Ivanovic at the 2007 Luxembourg Championships

At Wimbledon, Ivanovic defeated world No. 9 Nadia Petrova in the fourth round, and saved three match points to defeat Nicole Vaidišová in the quarterfinals. In the semifinals, three-time former Wimbledon champion Venus Williams defeated Ivanovic in two sets after Ivanovic had a break in the second set.

A persistent knee injury sustained at Wimbledon caused Ivanovic to withdraw from Serbian Fed Cup competition against Slovakia and two lead-up events to the US Open. She returned to the tour at the East West Bank Classic in Carson, California, saving two match points in the semifinals with huge winner before defeating No. 3 Janković in three sets. In the final, Ivanovic defeated top-10 player Petrova to win the fourth singles title of her career, which raised her ranking to a career-high of world No. 4.

In Ivanovic's first three matches at the US Open, she lost only 10 games. Venus Williams then eliminated her for the second consecutive time at a major.

Ivanovic returned to Europe for three tournaments. At the Tier II Luxembourg Championships, Ivanovic qualified for the Tour Championships by virtue of reaching the semifinals. In the final, Ivanovic rallied from 3–6, 0–3 down to defeat Daniela Hantuchová, her third title of the season. It was her fifth career title. In the quarterfinals and semifinals she beat Tatiana Golovin and Vera Zvonareva.

To end the year, Ivanovic played in the Sony Ericsson Championships in Madrid. Seeded 4th and assigned to the Red Group during the round-robin phase, she defeated world No. 2 Kuznetsova and then Hantuchová in straight sets. She qualified for the semifinals but Sharapova defeated Ivanovic in the final match of the round-robin stage. Because she finished second in her group, Ivanovic played world No. 1 Henin in the semifinals, in which the Belgian won in two sets.

Ivanovic finished the year with a career-high ranking of world No. 4.

=== 2008: French Open champion and world No. 1 ===
Ivanovic started the year at the Medibank International, where she made the quarterfinals, eventually losing to world No. 1, Justine Henin, despite having had break points in the third set. As the fourth seed at the Australian Open, Ivanovic made it all the way to the finals, beating top-10 players Venus Williams for the first time in her career, and coming back from a 0–6, 0–2 deficit against Daniela Hantuchová. She was given the nickname "Aussie Ana" during the on-court interview with Todd Woodbridge following the victory over Williams. Ivanovic fell against Sharapova in a tight match in the final where Ivanovic had 0–30 at 5–4 in first set. Her ranking rose to world No. 3, the highest of her career at the time.

In Serbia's Fed Cup Europe/Africa Zone Group I D round-robin tie against Poland, Romania and Netherlands Ivanovic won all of her matches, as Serbia advanced to the World Group II playoffs in April. And soon Serbia qualified for World Group II, after beating neighboring country Croatia.

In March, Ivanovic defeated Svetlana Kuznetsova in the final of the Tier I Pacific Life Open in Indian Wells after wins over top-15 players Francesca Schiavone, Vera Zvonareva, and world No. 4 Jelena Janković, in the semifinals. She lost to Lindsay Davenport in the third round of the Sony Ericsson Open in Miami the following week in straight sets.

Ivanovic started her clay-court season as defending champion at the Qatar Telecom German Open in Berlin where she lost to Elena Dementieva for the fourth time in four meetings in the semifinals. In Rome she lost to qualifier Tsvetana Pironkova, but it couldn't demoralize Ivanovic, as she defeated Petra Cetkovská 6–0, 6–0 in the fourth round, No. 10 Patty Schnyder in the quarterfinals, and No. 3 Jelena Janković in a thrilling encounter in the semifinals of French Open. She went on to defeat Dinara Safina in straight sets in the final, winning her first and only major singles title.

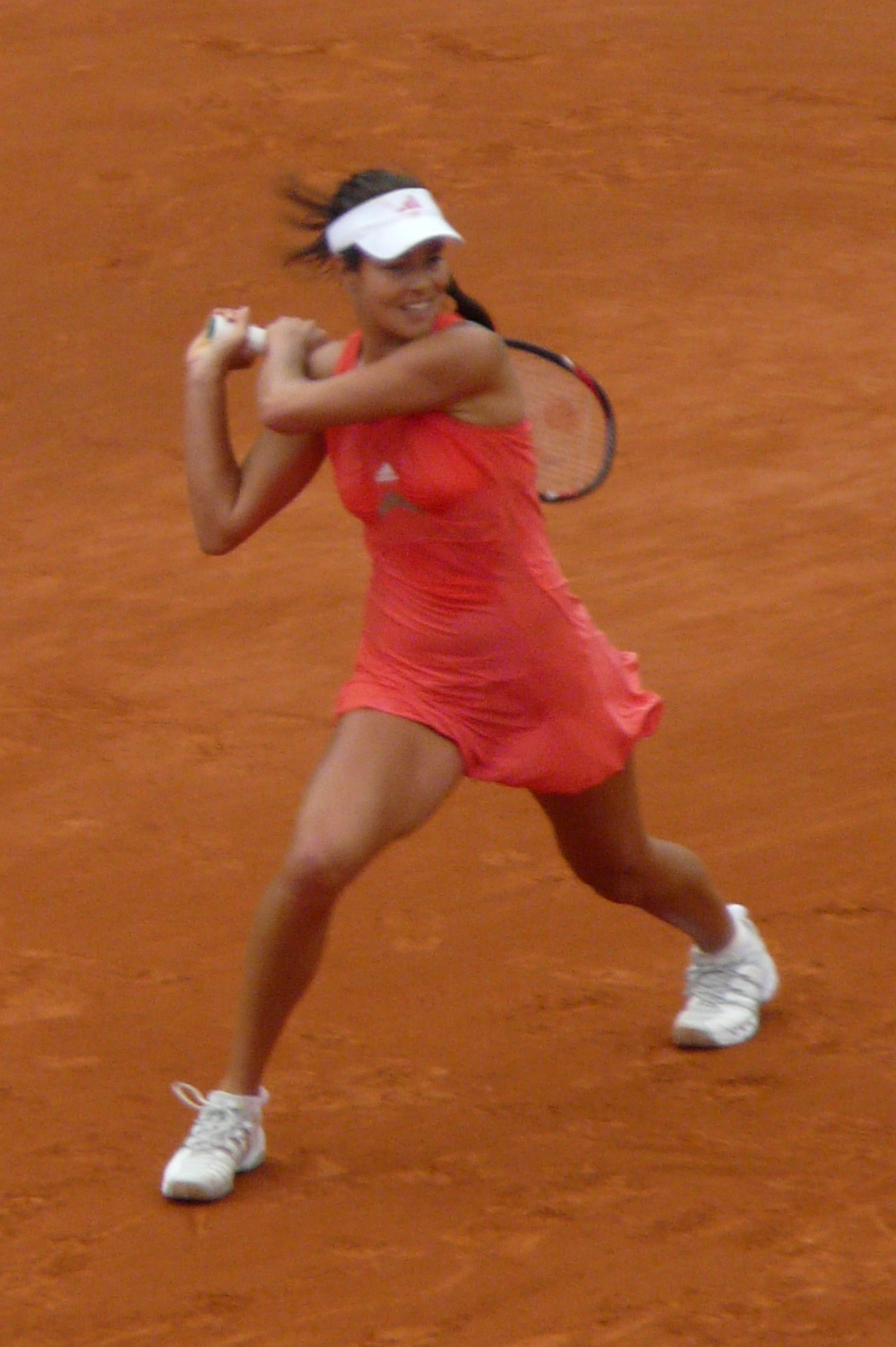
Ivanovic at the 2008 French Open

At Wimbledon, Ivanovic saved match points against Nathalie Dechy, but fell against unseeded wildcard Zheng Jie of China in straight sets in the third round.

Ivanovic started the summer hard-court season with a third-round loss at the Rogers Cup in Montreal to Tamira Paszek. Ivanovic, bothered by a sore thumb sustained during practice two weeks before Montreal, withdrew from the East West Bank Classic in Los Angeles. Her withdrawal saw her lose the world No. 1 ranking to Janković. The thumb injury also caused her to withdraw from the Summer Olympics in Beijing, which Ivanovic described as "one of the worst moments of her career." Ivanovic, having reclaimed her world No. 1 ranking on 18 August, was the top-seeded player at the US Open, but lost to qualifier Julie Coin in second round. The loss was the earliest defeat of the top-seeded player at the US Open since the 1973 tournament.

In her first match after the US Open, at the Tier I Toray Pan Pacific Open in Tokyo, Ivanovic was defeated by Nadia Petrova in three sets, bringing her win–loss record since the French Open to 4–4. Ivanovic later told the press that she was "just happy to be back injury-free" and that she needed to "play more matches get back into rhythm." Ivanovic then played in Beijing, and after two great results, she lost to Zheng Jie in three sets despite winning 16 more points than her opponent.

Then she came back to Europe to play three more tournaments, first in Moscow where she lost to Dominika Cibulková after having two match points. In the Zurich Open, she lost in the semifinals to Venus Williams after leading 3–1 in the third set. Ivanovic played in Linz and won the tournament as a top-seed by crushing top-10 players Agnieszka Radwańska and Vera Zvonareva in the final.

At the year-end Sony Ericsson Championships in Doha, Qatar, Ivanovic was seeded fourth. In her first round-robin match, she was defeated by world No. 1 Janković after she won the best point of the year. Her next match was against Zvonareva, to whom she also lost in three exciting sets. She withdrew from her final match against Kuznetsova because of a virus.

=== 2009: Out of the top 20 ===
At the Australian Open, Ivanovic was seeded fifth and won her first two matches in straight sets before losing to 29th seed Russian Alisa Kleybanova in the third round.

Ivanovic took part in Serbia's Fed Cup win in the World Group II tie against Japan. She defeated Ai Sugiyama and Ayumi Morita to help Serbia to a 4–1 win. At the Barclays Dubai Tennis Championships, a Premier-5 event, she lost to Serena Williams in the quarterfinals. Around this time, Ivanovic began working with her new coach Craig Kardon, after parting with former coach Sven Groeneveld.

At the BNP Paribas Open in Indian Wells, where she was defending champion, Ivanovic advanced to the finals, before losing to Vera Zvonareva. In Miami, Ivanovic lost in the third round to Ágnes Szávay. In April, she took part in Serbia's Fed Cup World Group play-offs against Spain. She defeated Anabel Medina Garrigues to help Serbia gain promotion to the World Group with a 4–0 win.

At the French Open, Ivanovic won her first three matches in straight sets, before losing to Victoria Azarenka in the fourth round. This early loss caused Ivanovic to fall out of the top ten for the first time since May 2007. After the loss, Ivanovic announced that she would cease working with Craig Kardon, and would be participating in the adidas Player Development Program, where she would be coached by Sven Groeneveld, Darren Cahill, Mats Merkel and Gil Reyes.

At Wimbledon, Ivanovic was seeded 13th. She faced two match points against Lucie Hradecká, before prevailing. She then took down Sara Errani and 18th seed Samantha Stosur in the second and third rounds in straight sets, before retiring against eventual finalist Venus Williams.

At the Rogers Cup in Toronto, Ivanovic defeated Magdaléna Rybáriková in the first round and went on to face Lucie Šafářová in the second round where she was eliminated.

At the US Open, Ivanovic lost in the first round of a Grand Slam for the first time in her career by succumbing to Kateryna Bondarenko. After the match, former Wimbledon champion Pat Cash criticized Ivanovic's new service motion, stating that watching it was a "painful experience" and that it "weakened her threat." He also felt that Ivanovic was "over-analysing" her game and that her main problem was "her lack of confidence."

At the Premier 5 Toray Pan Pacific Open in Tokyo, Ivanovic suffered her third successive defeat by losing to Lucie Šafářová in the first round. Citing an upper respiratory tract infection, Ivanovic pulled out of the China Open and announced on her website that she was taking the rest of the year off.

She finished the year with a 24–14 match record, her worst since she turned pro, and did not win any titles. Ivanovic only reached three quarterfinals, one semifinal, and one final, and only won back-to-back matches six times. Ivanovic ended the year ranked 22, the first time she had been ranked outside the top 20 since July 2005.

=== 2010: Return to the top 20 ===
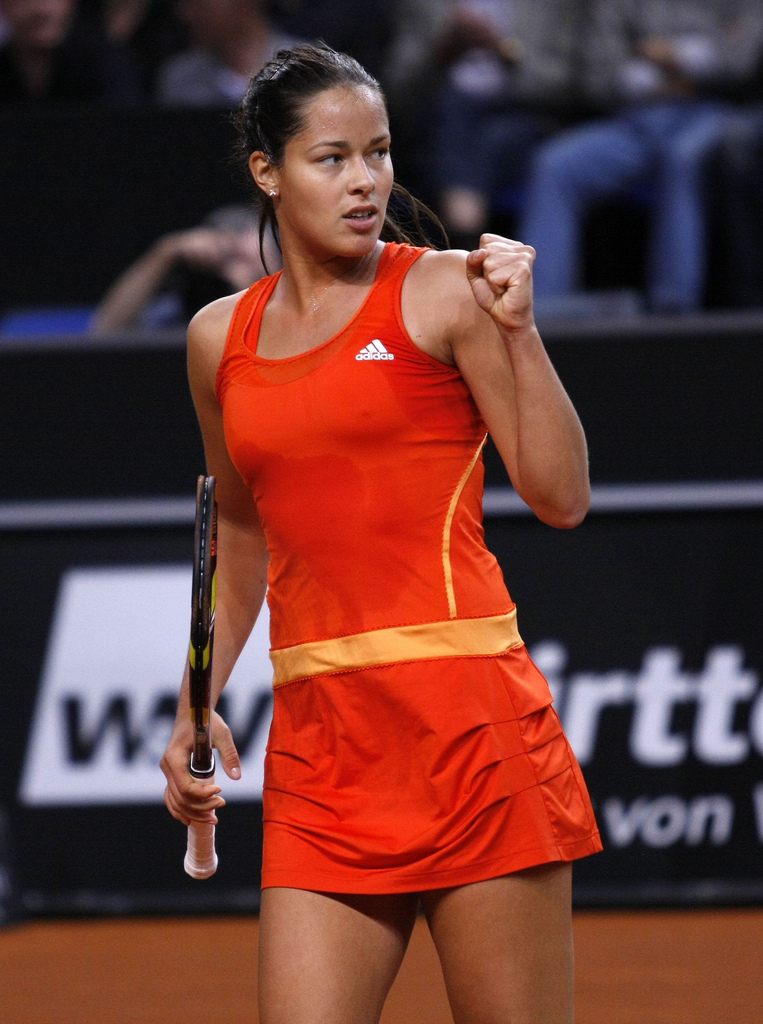
Ivanovic at the 2010 Porsche Tennis Grand Prix

Ivanovic started the year in Brisbane. Seeded third, Ivanovic reached her first semifinal since Indian Wells in 2009. She eventually bowed out to wildcard Justine Henin in Henin's first tournament since her return from retirement. Ivanovic was seeded 20th at the Australian Open, but lost to Gisela Dulko in the second round in three sets. She then participated in the opening round of the Fed Cup in Serbia's tie against Russia, and she went 0–2 in her singles matches and also lost her doubles match.

Ivanovic announced that she would be working with Steffi Graf's former coach Heinz Günthardt on a trial basis during the spring North American hard-court season, suspending her relationship with the Adidas Player Development Program indefinitely. In her first match as Gunthardt's pupil, a one-set semifinal against reigning US Open champion Kim Clijsters in the 2010 Billie Jean King Cup at Madison Square Garden, Ivanovic lost in a tiebreak, despite having held match point.

Despite her improvements, Ivanovic lost her opening match in Indian Wells, suffering four consecutive losses for the first time. By also losing a huge number of ranking points, Ivanovic dropped out of the top 50 for the first time since March 2005. Seeded 25th in Miami, Ivanovic won her first match since the Australian Open, but then lost to Radwańska in the third round.

Ivanovic lost again to Radwańska at the Porsche Tennis Grand Prix. But unseeded in Rome, Ivanovic had her best week of tennis in nearly two years. She stunned top-10 players Victoria Azarenka and Elena Dementieva, and top-20 player Nadia Petrova, all in straight sets, before losing to eventual champion María José Martínez Sánchez in the semifinals. She was granted a wildcard into the Madrid Open, and received a bye in the first round due to her semifinal appearance at the Italian Open. She was the first unseeded wildcard to receive a first-round bye in the history of the WTA Tour. She lost in the second round to Jelena Janković, despite leading by a set and a break. Ivanovic entered the French Open unseeded at a Grand Slam for the first time since 2005. She fell to Alisa Kleybanova in the second round.

In the UNICEF Open, Ivanovic fell to seventh-seeded German Andrea Petkovic in the second round. Ivanovic was defeated in the first round of Wimbledon by 13th seed Shahar Pe'er, and as a consequence saw her ranking drop to world No. 64.

In the opening round of the Stanford, Ivanovic avenged her 2009 Australian Open and 2010 French Open defeats by beating Alisa Kleybanova, before losing in the next round to Marion Bartoli in straight sets. In Cincinnati, she rallied from a set and a break down to beat Victoria Azarenka in three sets. Ivanovic retired against Kim Clijsters in the semifinals due to a foot injury. Her ranking dramatically improved to world No. 39. The injury caused her to withdraw from New Haven. Unseeded at the US Open, Ivanovic breezed into the fourth round, before losing to defending and eventual champion Kim Clijsters.

Ivanovic lost her opener to Vera Dushevina in Seoul as the 7th seed. Ivanovic then defeated Kleybanova, the Korea Open champion, in the first round of Tokyo, before again losing to Bartoli in straight sets. Ivanovic avenged her losses to Bartoli at the China Open, beating the Frenchwoman in straight sets. On her way to the quarterfinals, Ivanovic defeated Elena Dementieva for the second time in 2010 but fell world No. 1, Caroline Wozniacki in the semis.

Entering the Linz Open as a wildcard, Ivanovic defeated Patty Schnyder in the final in straight sets, in just 47 minutes of play. Ivanovic headed to the BGL Luxembourg Open as the fourth seed, where she reached the quarterfinals, before falling to eighth seed Julia Görges.

Ivanovic revealed that she had ended her coaching relationship with Swiss star Heinz Günthardt, because Gunthardt did not want to travel full-time and mixed his interest in tennis with being a Swiss television commentator.

By virtue of her title in Linz, Ivanovic qualified for the last tournament of the season, the Tournament of Champions. She made it to the final, where she defeated Kleybanova for her 10th career title and her second of the year. She won 10 of her last 13 matches. With her title in Bali, Ivanovic achieved a year-end ranking of No. 17, her fifth finish in the top 20.

=== 2011: Inconsistent form ===
Ivanovic started the year with the Hopman Cup in Perth, Western Australia. She competed along with Novak Djokovic and they qualified for the final, but due to an injury sustained during Ivanovic's match against Justine Henin, Serbia was forced to withdraw. Along with the Hopman Cup, Ivanovic also withdrew from Sydney. Seeded 19th at the Australian Open she lost to Ekaterina Makarova in the first round.

Ivanovic then played in the PTT Pattaya Open, where she fell in the quarterfinals to 5th seed Roberta Vinci in straight sets. In Dubai she lost against Patty Schnyder in their last professional match for many years. She stated the loss was in part because of the abdominal injury sustained in the beginning of the season, and she subsequently withdrew from Doha.

In fourth round of Indian Wells Ivanovic beat Jelena Janković, but lost to Marion Bartoli in the quarterfinals. She then played in Miami and lost against defending champion Kim Clijsters in fourth round, despite having a 5–1, 40–0 lead in the third set and having five match points.

Ivanovic joined Serbia in the 2011 Fed Cup event. Ivanovic scored a point for Serbia by beating Daniela Hantuchová in straight sets but had to retire in her next match against Dominika Cibulková, as she renewed an injury from the beginning of the season. Despite that, Serbia beat Slovakia in the deciding doubles rubber, 3–2.

Ivanovic lost to Bethanie Mattek-Sands in first round of Madrid, after winning the first set 6-0. Ivanovic headed to Rome and won her first round match against Nadia Petrova, who retired. Ivanovic lost in the next round to Yanina Wickmayer in three sets. In the first round at the French Open, Ivanovic again lost after winning the first set 6-0, to Johanna Larsson. Ivanovic had a slight resurgence in Birmingham, reaching the semifinals, but lost to Hantuchová in three sets. Ivanovic lost to Venus Williams in the second round at Eastbourne.

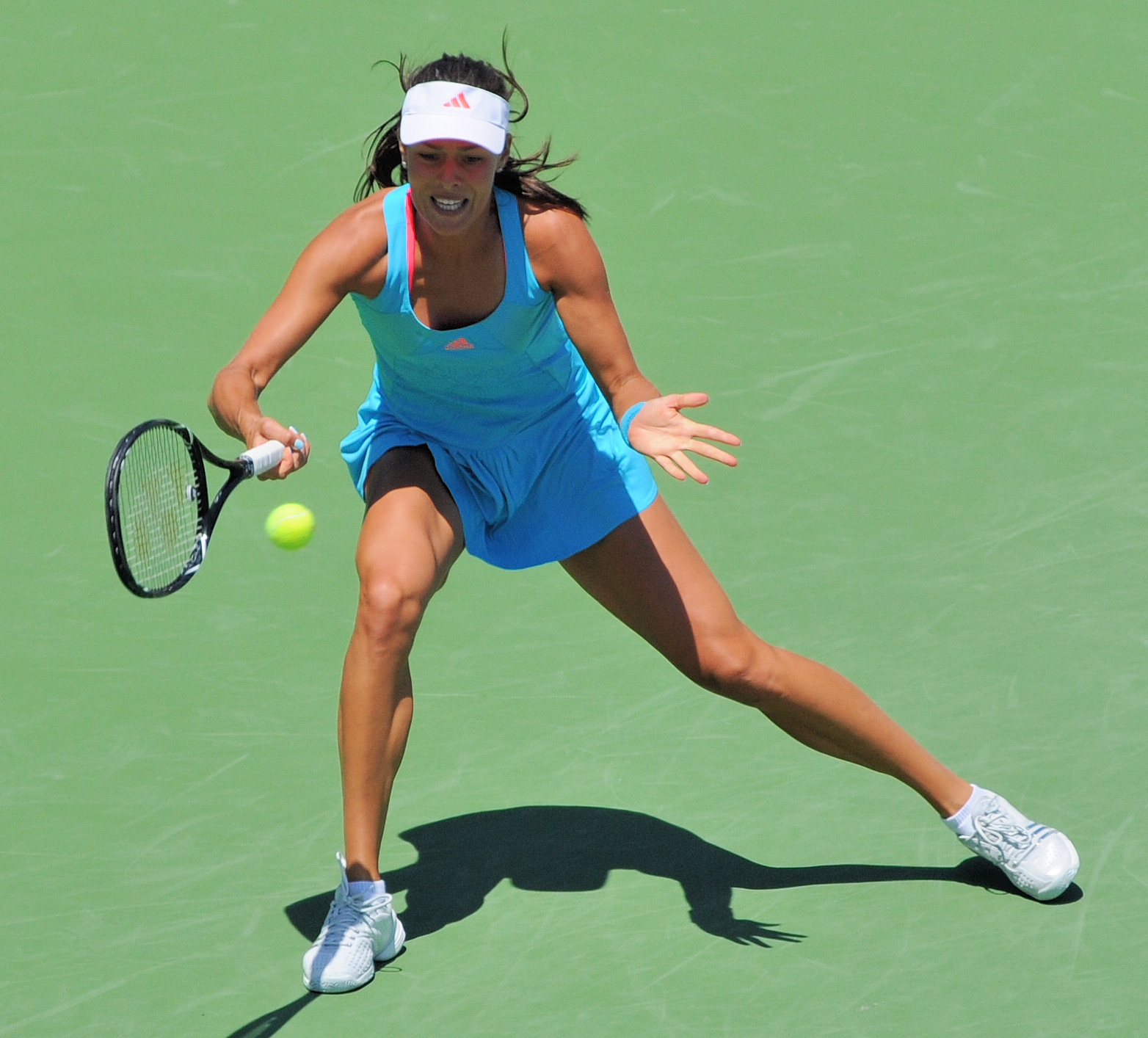
Ivanovic at the 2011 Mercury Insurance Open

Seeded 18th at Wimbledon, Ivanovic brushed aside Melanie Oudin and Eleni Daniilidou before falling to Petra Cetkovská. After Wimbledon, Ivanovic hired Nigel Sears, the head of women's tennis at the Lawn Tennis Association, as her coach. In Stanford, Ivanovic fell against Japan's Ayumi Morita in her opening match. Seeded 5th in Carlsbad, she avenged the previous week's loss by beating Ayumi Morita in straight sets despite trailing 0–5 in the second set. Ivanovic then cruised into semifinals. She eventually fell against top seed Vera Zvonareva in three sets. In Toronto and Cincinnati she won a total of three matches but against qualifiers. Seeded 16th at the US Open, she defeated Ksenia Pervak, received a walkover from Petra Cetkovská and beat Sloane Stephens in straight sets before falling to eventual finalist Serena Williams. She also played alongside fellow countryman Nenad Zimonjić in the mixed-doubles competition for the first time, but fell against Mariusz Fyrstenberg and Chan Yung-jan in two sets.

During Tokyo Ivanovic recorded victories in straight sets over Anastasia Rodionova and wildcard Laura Robson, before losing to Maria Kirilenko. At the China Open Ivanovic beat Kimiko Date-Krumm, Svetlana Kuznetsova and world No. 3 Vera Zvonareva, losing total of ten games. But she then retired in second set against Agnieszka Radwańska in the quarterfinals due to a back injury.

Ivanovic received a wild card to play the Tournament of Champions, which she defended, beating Roberta Vinci, Nadia Petrova and Anabel Medina Garrigues in the final, capturing her 11th WTA title. It was the first time she had ever defended her title in a tournament.

=== 2012: US Open quarterfinal and Fed Cup final ===
Ivanovic began her season in Brisbane where she was defeated in the second round by fifth seed Kim Clijsters in three sets, despite leading 3–0 in the final set. Ivanovic's next event was in Sydney and she was sent out in the first round by Lucie Šafářová in straight sets. Ivanovic then headed over to the Australian Open where she reached the fourth round as a 21st seed, before losing to world No. 2, Petra Kvitová, in two sets. She entered the top 20 of the world rankings after her run to the round of 16.

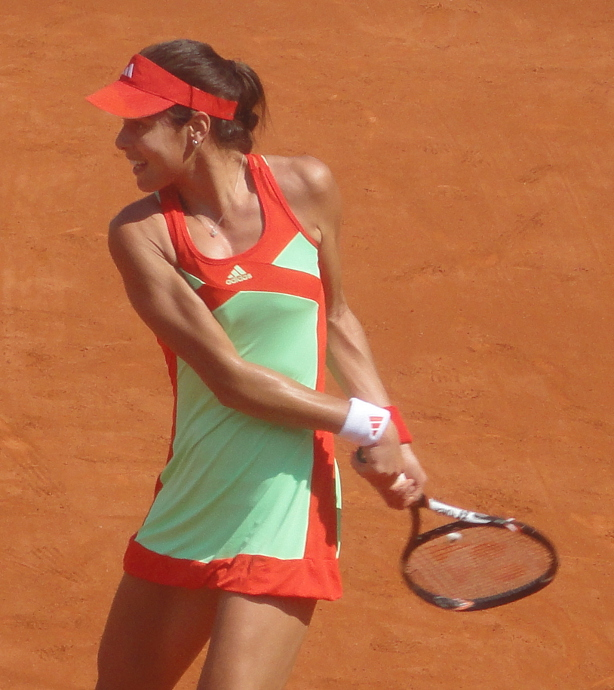
Ivanovic at the 2012 French Open

Ivanovic next played in Doha. She fell to Petra Cetkovská in straight sets in the second round. Ivanovic then went to Dubai unseeded, where she upset Francesca Schiavone and beat Maria Kirilenko, before being defeated by 3rd seed Caroline Wozniacki. Ivanovic went over to Indian Wells as the 15th seed. She was able to make a run all the way to the semifinals, posting victories over former World No. 1 Caroline Wozniacki and Marion Bartoli, who were both in the top 8. She retired against Maria Sharapova after losing the first set. In Miami she beat Daniela Hantuchová before losing to Venus Williams in fourth round, despite holding a one set lead. Despite this defeat she still moved into the top 15 for the first time since 2009.

Ivanovic then headed to Moscow for the Fed Cup semifinals, where after losing to Svetlana Kuznetsova in three tight sets, recovered, and beat Anastasia Pavlyuchenkova to put Serbia ahead, 2–1. Fellow countrywoman Jelena Janković then closed out the tie for Serbia (3–2), sending the country into the Fed Cup finals for the first time in history.

Ivanovic resumed tour action in Stuttgart, where she was beaten by Mona Barthel in two tight sets. She then headed over to the newly blue-clayed Madrid where she breezed past Mathilde Johansson and Nadia Petrova, before falling in straight sets to world No. 1 Azarenka, despite leading 4–1 in the first set. In Rome she avenged her Fed Cup loss against Kuznetsova, but fell to No. 2 Sharapova in straight sets, despite serving for the first set. Seeded 13th at the French Open, Ivanovic beat Lara Arruabarrena Vecino and Shahar Pe'er, losing only six games over the course of the two matches. Despite continuing in style and winning the first of the match, she lost to eventual finalist Sara Errani in the third round.

Seeded 14th at Wimbledon, she worked for victories over María José Martínez Sánchez, Kateryna Bondarenko and 22nd seed Julia Görges to reach fourth round, her best result there since 2009. She then suffered a bad loss to 2nd seed Azarenka in the fourth round; winning only one game. Despite the loss, her run caused her ranking to rise to No. 12 in the following week.

She made her Olympic debut at the Summer Olympics in London, participating in both the Women's singles and Mixed Doubles with Nenad Zimonjić. Seeded 11th in singles, she defeated Christina McHale and local Elena Baltacha in straight sets, before losing for the sixth time to Kim Clijsters in third round. She teamed up with Zimonjić for the mixed doubles competition, where they lost against India's Mirza and Paes in the opening round.

At the 2012 Rogers Cup, Ivanovic was double bageled by Roberta Vinci in the second round. It didn't seem to affect Ivanovic at the US Open as she reached her first Grand Slam quarterfinal since winning the 2008 French Open title, and her first quarterfinal in New York. Ivanovic defeated qualifier Elina Svitolina and Sofia Arvidsson in straight sets, came back from a set down to beat young American Sloane Stephens in the third round followed by Tsvetana Pironkova in the fourth round. In the quarterfinals Ivanovic was soundly defeated by eventual champion Serena Williams for the second year in a row.

Ivanovic then played in Tokyo, losing to Urszula Radwańska in round two; she then competed at the China Open reaching the third round, losing to Romina Oprandi in straight sets. She came with a winning streak to Linz, having won there previously in 2008 and 2010, but her streak was finished in quarterfinals against qualifier Kirsten Flipkens. Ivanovic headed over to Moscow and made it all the way to the semifinal, having had a bye in the first round then defeating two qualifiers in straight sets. She lost to Samantha Stosur in three sets, despite winning the first.

Ivanovic did not qualify to defend her title in Bali, and did not receive a wildcard-entry due to her participation at the 2012 Fed Cup. Serbia took on the defending champions, Czech Republic. Ivanovic lost her first rubber against Lucie Šafářová, but won her second against Petra Kvitová. Which meant Jelena Janković had to win her rubber to take it to a tie, and go to a decider. Janković eventually lost her rubber against Lucie Šafářová. However, Ivanovic finished 2012 as the world No. 13, her best finish since 2008.

=== 2013: Steady results ===
Ivanovic kicked off the year by playing at the Hopman Cup with Djokovic. In her first round-robin match, she beat Italy's Francesca Schiavone. She beat Ashleigh Barty and in her final round-robin match defeated Tatjana Malek to put Serbia into the final, having defeated Italy, Australia and Germany. While playing Spain, Djokovic gave Serbia a 1–0 tie lead but Anabel Medina Garrigues tied up the final at 1–1 after defeating Ivanovic in a closely fought singles match. Serbia then lost the deciding tie in mixed doubles.

At the Australian Open, she successfully reached the fourth round of the tournament, progressing past Melinda Czink, Yung-Jan Chen and Jelena Janković. She eventually lost to Agnieszka Radwańska in two sets. Ivanovic played in Pattaya City as the No. 1 seed but lost in the first round to Ayumi Morita. Ivanovic was then scheduled to play at the Fed Cup but withdrew due to shoulder injuries. Ivanovic competed at the Qatar Total Open as the 12th seed. She made a run to the third round, but lost to Agnieszka Radwańska, despite breaking her in the 12th game and having the chance to serve out for the second set. She reached the second round of the Dubai Tennis Championships, before losing narrowly to Petra Kvitová.

Ivanovic received a first round bye at the BNP Paribas Open. In her second round match, she defeated American teenager Taylor Townsend losing just three games. In the third round, she lost in three sets to big-serving Mona Barthel from Germany. At the subsequent Premier Mandatory event Sony Open Tennis, Ivanovic exacted revenge on Urszula Radwańska by dishing out a two set drubbing and cruised past two-time grand slam champion Svetlana Kuznetsova. However, Ivanovic lost to eighth seeded Errani in three sets in the fourth round. Ivanovic then took part in the Monterrey Open and was defeated in the second round by defending champion Tímea Babos from Hungary.

Despite a slow start to the 2013 season, Ivanovic made good progress in the clay season. Notably, she defeated upcoming players Mona Barthel (who she lost to at Indian Wells) and Laura Robson, as well as higher-seeded players Nadia Petrova at Stuttgart and Angelique Kerber twice at the Fed Cup week two playoffs and at the Mutua Madrid Open. As a result of Ivanovic's more consistent tennis in the clay season, she reached the quarterfinals in Stuttgart despite not being seeded, and managed to reach the semifinals of the Premier Mandatory Madrid Open for the first time in her career. In both Stuttgart and Madrid, her runs were routed by 2012 French Open champion Maria Sharapova. Unfortunately, after good runs at two clay-court tournaments, she dropped her opener in Rome against Urszula Radwańska. At the French Open she stormed past three opponents to the fourth round, only to fall in straight sets to Agnieszka Radwańska.

At Wimbledon, she won her first round match-up against Virginie Razzano, but in the second round Ivanovic would be knocked out of the tournament by Eugenie Bouchard.

In July, Sears and Ivanovic part ways and she hired Nemanja Kontic as her coach. Ivanovic had a sub-par summer hard-court season, only managing to defeat one other seeded player. At Carlsbad, she defeated Roberta Vinci before getting edged out by world No. 2, Victoria Azarenka, in the semifinals. In Toronto, she made quick work of Hsieh Su-wei and Flavia Pennetta in straight sets, before losing to Li Na in three sets. Ivanovic was up 5–2 in the third set, but was unable to serve out the match and eventually lost when she sent a backhand long in the tiebreak. Ivanovic dropped her opener in Cincinnati to Alizé Cornet. At the US Open, Ivanovic made it to the fourth round, narrowly scraping past American player Christina McHale in the third round by erasing two of her opponent's match points. Ivanovic made a whopping 51 unforced errors in her match against Christina McHale. In the fourth round, Ivanovic lost to Victoria Azarenka again in three sets.

Ivanovic then headed to Asia for the Premier events in Tokyo and Beijing after a two-week break. In the former, she routed young German Annika Beck before cruising past Elina Svitolina. In the third round, she lost to Anqelique Kerber for the first time. In the latter, she moved past Flavia Pennetta in two sets despite trailing 5–1 in the first set. She was then defeated surprisingly by Polona Hercog of Slovenia in straight sets. Ivanovic then headed to Linz and progressed to the final without dropping a set, beating Yanina Wickmayer, Francesca Schiavone, Dominika Cibulková and Stefanie Vögele before being edged out in the final by Kerber once more, despite having saved three match points and had four set points of her own to take the match into a decider. She then took part in the Kremlin Cup in Moscow as the fourth seed, receiving a bye in the first round before breezing past Klára Koukalová. She was edged out by Samantha Stosur, who had also beaten her in the semifinals the year before.

At the Tournament of Champions, Ivanovic was allocated into the Sredets Group alongside Samantha Stosur, Elena Vesnina and Tsvetana Pironkova. In her first round-robin match, Ivanovic captured a two-set victory over Pironkova. She then went on to defeat Stosur. She needed one more victory to come first in her group. However, Ivanovic lost to Vesnina for the second time this year despite leading 5–2 in third set and serving two times for the match. But despite losing, she still qualified for the semifinals by winning a set, therefore coming second in her group (after Stosur). In her semifinal match, she lost to eventual champion Simona Halep despite leading 3–0 in third set with two breaks in her own.

Ivanovic ended the 2013 season with a rank of 16.

=== 2014: Resurgence and return to the top 5 ===
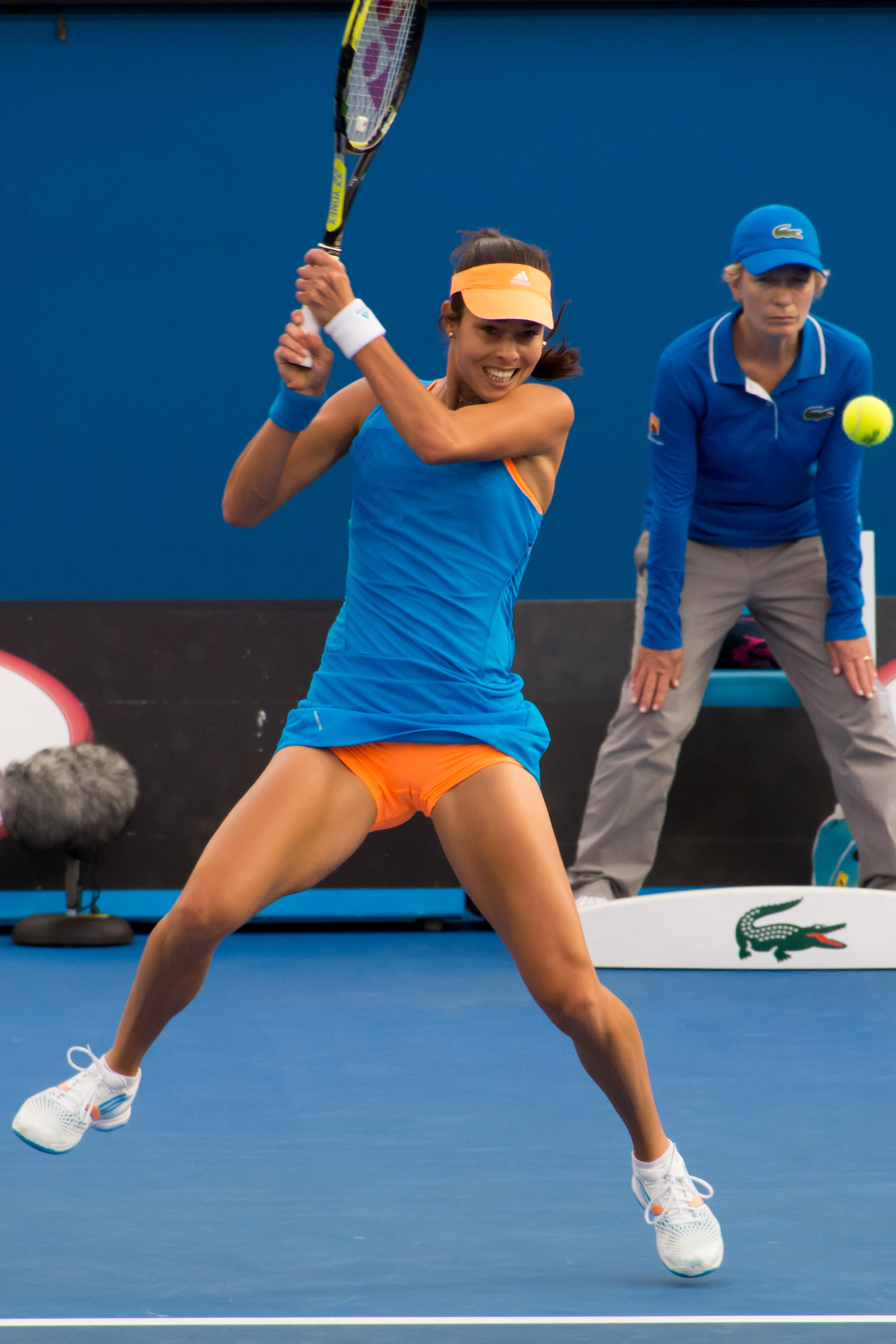
Ivanovic at the 2014 Australian Open

Ivanovic started the 2014 season by winning the title in Auckland, defeating Venus Williams in the final in three sets, for her 12th title and her first since November 2011. At the Australian Open, she defeated No. 1 ranked Serena Williams in the fourth round for her first win over Williams, after battling past Samantha Stosur in three sets. She lost to 30th seed Canadian Eugenie Bouchard in the quarterfinals in three sets. On set point for Bouchard, Ivanovic double-faulted.

At the next four tournaments of the Asian and American series, Ivanovic failed to make the quarterfinals at all of them. She beat top players such as Angelique Kerber (saving match point) in Dubai and Flavia Pennetta in Miami. But there were some big outages like a double bagel against Petra Kvitová after Ivanovic won the first set. In Monterrey, Ivanovic was the second seed and went on to win her second title of the year, by defeating third seed Caroline Wozniacki in the semifinals and Jovana Jakšić in the WTA's first-ever all-Serbian final.

Representing Serbia in Fed Cup against Romania, Ivanovic lost against Sorana Cîrstea, but beat world No. 5 Simona Halep in straight sets. Serbia would go on to lose the tie 1–4.

Ivanovic then participated in Stuttgart where she made it all the way to the final, achieving back-to-back finals for the first time in her career. It was also the first time in five years, since the 2009 BNP Paribas Open, that Ivanovic had reached a Premier level final. En route she achieved other career milestones, defeating Julia Görges for her 400th career win and world No. 6, Jelena Janković, for her 40th career top-10 win. She eventually lost to two-time defending champion Maria Sharapova in the final in three sets.

In Madrid, Ivanovic won her first three matches in straight sets to reach the quarterfinals, losing to Simona Halep in just one hour. Ivanovic avenged her loss against Sharapova in Stuttgart by defeating her in their round of the Italian Open in straight sets. By doing so, she became the only person to defeat Sharapova on clay that year. The win was significant most of all because she became the first player other than Serena Williams to defeat Sharapova on clay since 2011, and ended her winning streak in Rome (Sharapova was 47–3 on the surface and was undefeated in Rome since 2011). Against Serena Williams, in her second appearance in the Rome semifinals, she lost in three sets.

At the French Open Ivanovic was the 11th seed. This was her best Grand Slam seeding since the 2009 US Open where she was the same seed. In the first two rounds, she defeated rising stars, Caroline Garcia and Elina Svitolina, before falling to 23rd seed Lucie Šafářová in straight sets. This marked the fifth straight time that Šafarova had beaten Ivanovic.

Ivanovic made a quick transition from clay to grass as she won her first grass-court title in Birmingham, as the first seed. Ivanovic beat Barbora Záhlavová-Strýcová in the final. In all matches, she lost five or less games. At Wimbledon Ivanovic came in again as the 11th seed. She started well, with wins over Zheng Jie and Francesca Schiavone, all in straight sets. In third round she faced grass court specialist and 2013 Wimbledon runner-up, Sabine Lisicki. She won their match played earlier in the season. However, she would go on to lose in three sets. The match was particularly strange due to it being played over three days over the Middle Sunday. The first part was played on Saturday and with Lisicki leading 6–4, 1–1, the match was suspended due to bad light. On Monday match was played in two parts, being paused due to rain. In the first period of play, Ivanovic had momentum on her side. Upon resumption, Lisicki would go on to win seven of the next nine games. After Wimbledon, Ivanovic did not renew her contract with coach Nemanja Kontic. She hired Dejan Petrovic as her coach.

Ivanovic started the US Open Series in Stanford, avenging her Wimbledon loss by defeating Sabine Lisicki in straight sets. Ivanovic eventually lost in the quarterfinals in three sets to Serena Williams in their third three-set match of the year. As a result of her quarterfinals run, Ivanovic returned to the top ten in the WTA rankings for the first time since 2009. Then at the Rogers Cup, Ivanovic lost to eventual quarterfinalist CoCo Vandeweghe in the second round; but in Cincinnati, she reached the Premier-5 final, beating Russians Svetlana Kuznetsova and 5th seed Sharapova in the process. Against Sharapova, Ivanovic served for the match in the second set, but lost the next four games. Sharapova then served for the match, but Ivanovic saved two match points and went on to win, setting up a final match against Serena Williams. Ivanovic lost the final to Williams in straight sets.

At the US Open, Ivanovic was seeded 8th, her highest Grand Slam seeding since the 2009 French Open. In the first round she beat American Alison Riske in straight sets only allowing her opponent to win three games, but was upset by unseeded Czech Karolína Plíšková in the second round in two close sets.

The following month, Ivanovic played in Tokyo, defeating former world No. 1 Azarenka, Šafářová (ending her five-match losing streak against the Czech) and top-seed Angelique Kerber to reach the final. She then beat in straight sets for her 15th title. She marked some personal achievements: this was her 52nd win and fourth title of the season, both personal bests. In Wuhan, she had to play the day after winning Tokyo and decided to retire in the second set of the match against Anastasia Pavlyuchenkova. Ivanovic came into Beijing refreshed and beat Belinda Bencic, Romina Oprandi and Lisicki, all in straight sets. She set a quarterfinal clash with Simona Halep, but the world No. 2 had to withdraw allowing Ivanovic to advance to the semifinals. Ivanovic lost to Sharapova, but with those points she secured her spot in the WTA Finals.

Having qualified for the Tour Championships, Ivanovic was drawn into the Red Group alongside Serena Williams, Halep and Bouchard. In Ivanovic's first match of the tournament, against top-seed Serena Williams, she lost in straight sets. However, she clinched victory in her second match, against Bouchard. Despite defeating Halep in her final round-robin match, Ivanovic was unable to progress since she dropped a set in the process. In doing so, she became the first player since Lindsay Davenport in 2004 to not progress to the semifinals with a 2–1 record in RR play. However, Ivanovic did finish the year ranked No. 5, her second best year-end ranking since turning pro.

Following the end of the season, Ivanovic played and defeated world No. 1 Serena Williams in straight sets in an exhibition match in Denmark. She also went on to participate in the inaugural International Premier Tennis League held in cities across Asia. As part of the Micromax Indian Aces, Ivanovic played alongside many big names, including Roger Federer and Pete Sampras. Due to the new, fast-paced format unique to the IPTL, Ivanovic only played one set per match, representing her team in the women's singles category. The Aces went on to clinch the title, with Ivanovic amassing a total of nine wins and three losses.

=== 2015: Struggles with form and return to a Grand Slam semifinal ===
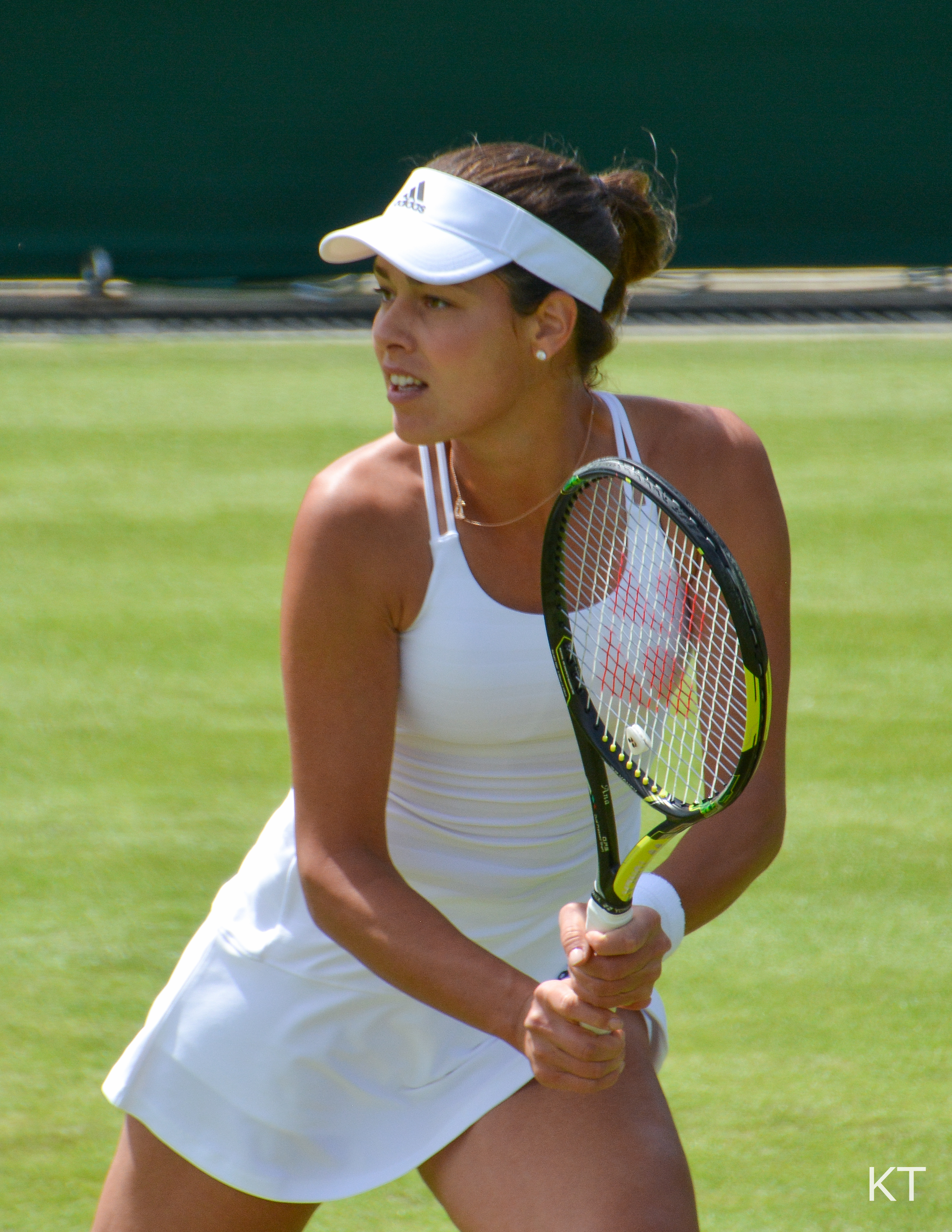
Ivanovic at the 2015 Wimbledon Championships

Ivanovic began her 2015 season reaching final of the Brisbane International. She lost one set against Kaia Kanepi en route. By beating Varvara Lepchenko, Ivanovic set up a final clash against Maria Sharapova, which she lost despite taking the first set in a tiebreak. Ivanovic entered the Australian Open as the fifth seed, but lost in the opening round in three sets to qualifier Lucie Hradecká, losing for the third time to a Czech player in her last four major appearances. She later revealed that she was struggling with a toe injury during the match. At her next tournament in Dubai, she lost just three games against Sabine Lisicki in the second round, but struggles continued as she lost to Karolína Plíšková in three sets.

Ivanovic was the defending champion in Monterrey, but she lost Caroline Garcia in the semifinals. At Indian Wells, she lost two more times to Garcia in both doubles and singles. In Miami Ivanovic beat Irina Falconi in the second round in three sets before losing in the third round to Sabine Lisicki in straight sets.

Ivanovic started her clay-court season with a third straight loss to Garcia in Stuttgart. Prior to the Madrid Open, Ivanovic parted ways with coach Dejan Petrovic. She lost in the third round to Carla Suárez Navarro in three sets. She then played in the Italian Open and lost in the second round to qualifier and eventual semifinalist, Daria Gavrilova, in three sets after failing to serve out the match in the third set. Ivanovic entered the French Open as the seventh seed. In the first and second rounds, she came back from a set down to beat Yaroslava Shvedova and Misaki Doi, and with her third-round victory over Donna Vekić, Ivanovic reached 100 wins at Grand Slam events. In the fourth round, she beat Ekaterina Makarova in three sets. In the quarterfinals, she beat Elina Svitolina in straight sets to advance to the semifinals of a major for the first time since she won the title in Paris back in 2008. She lost to Lucie Šafářová in two tight sets despite being up 5–2 in the first set.

Ivanovic started her grass-court season at the Birmingham Classic as the defending champion. She failed to defend her title, losing in the second round to Michelle Larcher de Brito in three sets despite serving for the match in the third set. Ivanovic entered Wimbledon as the seventh seed. She easily beat Xu Yifan in the first round in straight sets but then lost in the second round to Bethanie Mattek-Sands in straight sets.

In late July, she went back to working with former coach, Nigel Sears. Ivanovic began her summer hard-court season at the Rogers Cup where she was seeded fifth. She beat qualifiers Olga Govortsova and Polona Hercog to advance to the quarterfinals for the first time since 2006. She lost to eventual champion, Belinda Bencic in straight sets. Ivanovic then played at the Western & Southern Open where she was defending finalist points. After receiving a walkover in the second round from Venus Williams, she beat Sloane Stephens in three sets to set up a rematch of last year's final against Serena Williams in the quarterfinals which she lost in three sets despite being up a set and a break in both the second and third sets. Ivanovic next played at the US Open as the seventh seed. She lost in the first round to Dominika Cibulková in three sets.

Ivanovic began her Asian hard court swing at the Toray Pan Pacific Open. As the defending champion, she beat Camila Giorgi in the second round in straight sets to advance to the quarterfinals where she lost to Cibulková in straight sets. Ivanovic's next tournament was the Wuhan Open. She easily beat both Alexandra Dulgheru and Madison Brengle to advance to the third round where she lost to Garbiñe Muguruza in three sets. Her next tournament was the China Open. She beat Casey Dellacqua to advance to the second round, where she defeated an in-form Venus Williams in straight sets, winning the last six games of the second set in a row after going down an early break. She followed up the win by beating Kuznetsova and Pavlyuchenkova to advance to the semifinals. In the semis, she lost to Timea Bacsinszky in three sets. The loss ended Ivanovic's chances to qualify for the WTA Finals.

She then played at the BGL Luxembourg Open. After beating Heather Watson, she lost to Alison Van Uytvanck in three tight sets. Despite not qualifying for the WTA Finals, she did qualify for the WTA Elite Trophy, but she withdrew. Ivanovic ended the year at No. 16.

=== 2016: Final year ===
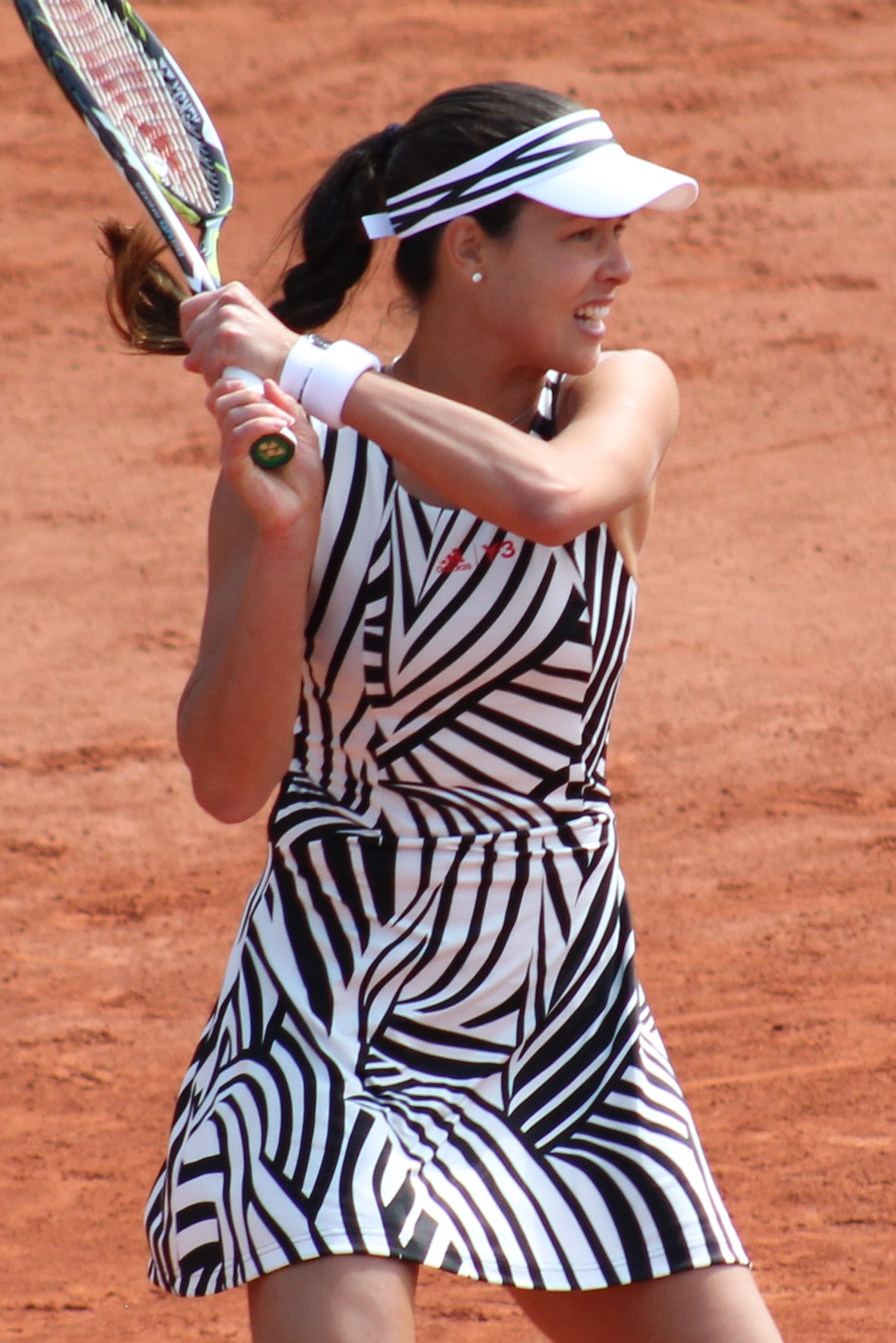
Ivanovic at the 2016 French Open

At the Auckland Open Ivanovic was seeded second but lost in the first round to British qualifier Naomi Broady in straight sets. Ivanovic took a wildcard into the Apia International Sydney and lost in the first round to Karolína Plíšková in straight sets. During the Australian Open, she beat Tammi Patterson and Anastasija Sevastova, both in straight sets to advance to the third round. Ivanovic lost to Madison Keys in three sets despite being up a set and a break in both the second and third sets. During the match Ivanovic's coach, Nigel Sears collapsed and was taken to a hospital where it was later confirmed that he was conscious.

Ivanovic's next tournament was the St. Petersburg Ladies' Trophy where she made it through to the semifinals. She beat Margarita Gasparyan & Kateryna Kozlova before losing to Roberta Vinci in straight sets. At the Dubai Tennis Championships, after defeating Daria Gavrilova and world No. 3, Simona Halep, Ivanovic lost to Barbora Strýcová. At Indian Wells she beat Camila Giorgi but then lost to Karolína Plíšková in round 3. In Miami she lost to Timea Bacsinszky. In Stuttgart she won her first-round match but then lost in the second round to Karolína Plíšková.

In the first round of the Madrid Open, Ivanovic beat qualifier Kateřina Siniaková in three sets, however, she lost to another qualifier Louisa Chirico in the second round. At the Italian Open, she beat Anastasia Pavlyuchenkova in the first round, but lost to Christina McHale in the second round. Ivanovic had a tough first-round match win at the French Open after she beat Océane Dodin in three sets. She defeated Kurumi Nara in the second round, but lost to Elina Svitolina in the third round. Ivanovic only won 15 matches in 2016 with the last coming in June. She played her career's last professional match in the first round of the US Open against Denisa Allertova and lost in straight sets. On 28 December, having been absent with injury since August, Ivanovic announced her retirement stating that she was no longer able to play to her high standards and win big tournaments, meaning it was time to move on from professional tennis and start a new chapter in her life.

At the 2017 French Open, a ceremony was held on Court Philippe Chatrier to honour Ivanovic.

== Equipment and endorsements ==
Ivanovic endorsed Nike apparel and shoes at the beginning of her professional career, but at the beginning of 2006 switched to rival Adidas and has her own signature line. Ivanovic then signed a lifetime contract with the company. Ivanovic became an Ambassador for Adidas once she retired from competitive tennis. She is believed to be the youngest athlete, male or female, to sign a contract of such longevity.

She started with Wilson racquets, eventually using the nCode nBlade painted H22. From the beginning of 2008 to the end of her career, Ivanovic used Yonex racquets. She won the 2008 French Open using the Yonex RQiS 1 Tour 95 before switching to the Yonex RQiS 1 Tour XL 95 in 2009. She began using a prototype version of a new Yonex racquet at the 2010 Western & Southern Financial Group Masters and Women's Open in Cincinnati. Ivanovic then started endorsing Yonex's EZONE line beginning with the EZONE 100. She then switched to the Yonex EZONE XI 98 in 2012, then played with the Yonex EZONE AI 98 in 2014, and finished her career with the Yonex EZONE DR 98.

In 2008, Ivanovic signed an endorsement deal with Rolex.

== Playing style ==
Ivanovic was an offensive baseliner with an aggressive style of play. After winning the 2008 French Open and becoming No. 1, Ivanovic endured a decline in form. Many critics attributed this to lack of confidence. At the 2010 Australian Open, Hall of Famer Martina Navratilova commented that, "while she has absolutely no confidence in herself, she still fights till the last point." She made some improvements to her playing style after appointing a new coach in 2010. As a result, she started to play with more confidence and won matches more consistently.

=== Serve ===
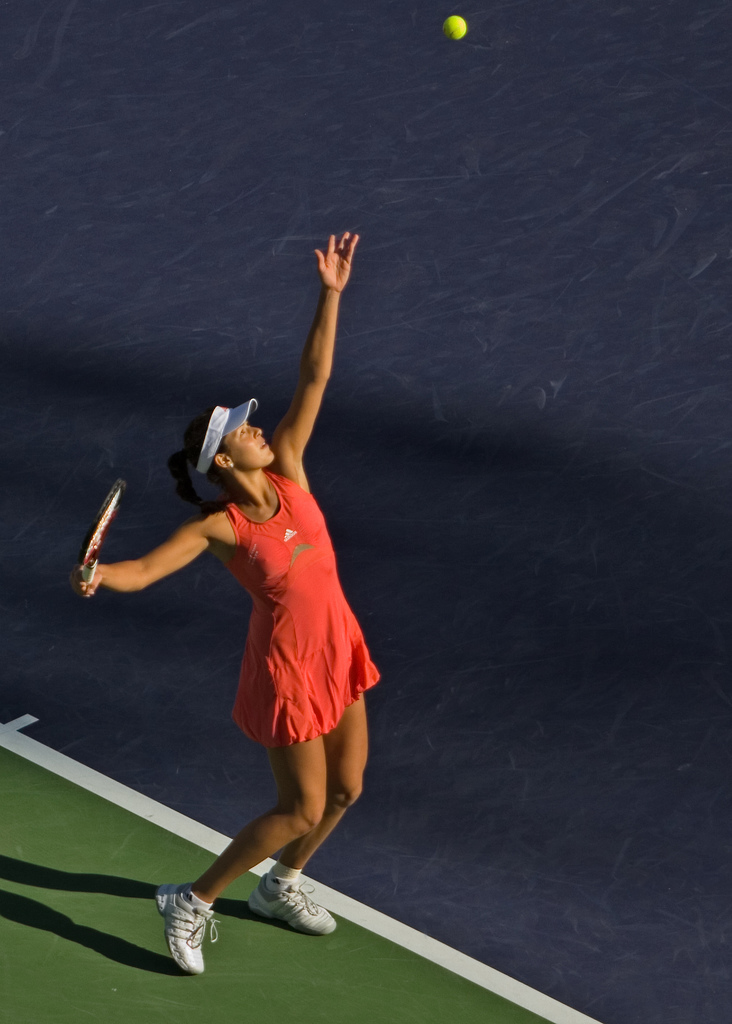
Ivanovic serving at Indian Wells, 2008

She hit a 124.9 mph (201.0 km/h) serve at the French Open in 2007, the fifth fastest serve of all time on the WTA Tour. However, from 2009 to 2012, her service game was largely viewed as a liability instead of a weapon. This was because of her inconsistent ball tosses which were directly associated with her diminishing confidence. Nonetheless, in 2013, under the tutelage of Nigel Sears, her ball tosses became more consistent, allowing her to build her game on her powerful first serves.

=== Groundstrokes ===
Ivanovic's flat and powerful forehand was her bread-and-butter shot that, in 2007–08, propelled her to the top of the rankings. However, her backhand was a much weaker wing and was often targeted by players acquainted with Ivanovic's playing style. Her cross-court backhand generally lacked the depth required to throw her opponents off course.

While Ivanovic's movement and net play were once considered to be her weaknesses, they both improved over the years. Towards the end of her career she was considered faster than when she started playing professional tennis.

=== Surfaces ===
Ivanovic's best surface was clay, where her height allowed her to strike clean winners off high-bouncing balls. In addition, her weakness in movement was mitigated on slower clay courts. Nonetheless, she was capable of performing well on hard and grass courts as well. When she launched her re-branded site during 2010, she stated in her bio that she likes all surfaces.

== Rivalries ==
=== Ivanovic vs. Janković ===
Ivanovic and her fellow Serbian Jelena Janković have encountered each other 12 times with Ivanovic having the advantage 9 to 3 in match wins (including a walkover). The pair played their first match against each other in an abandoned swimming pool used as a tennis court in Belgrade. A 9-year-old Janković won the match, beating the 7-year-old Ivanovic 7–1. When asked why Ivanovic has posed such a problem for herself, Janković remarked that she struggles to read Ivanovic's game mostly due to the fact Ivanovic likes to play short points. Ivanovic leads 2–1 on clay, 6–2 on hard courts and 1–0 on carpet courts.

The longest match contested between the two in the semi-finals at the East West Bank Classic in Los Angeles. In a match lasting two and a half hours, Ivanovic recovered from a 4–1 third set deficit, saving two match points en route, to defeat Janković on her way to the title. The most significant match between the pair took place in the semi-finals of the French Open, with the winner having assured of becoming world No. 1 and with both women bidding to win their first Grand Slam title. Ivanovic won the match, recovering from a 3–1 final set deficit to defeat Jankovic for the fifth consecutive time. Jankovic's win at the 2008 WTA Tour Championships in Doha later that year snapped a 5 match losing streak against her compatriot.

The relationship between the pair has been strained. Both have openly admitted in the past to not liking each other and have been involved in a number of high-profile spats on and off court. Ivanovic was criticized both by Janković and her mother after Ivanovic decided to withdraw from Serbia's Fed Cup World Group play-off tie against Slovakia, citing her poor form in 2010 which left Janković the only high-profile player to play the tie which Serbia lost 3–2. During the same weekend, Ivanovic was photographed having coffee with her boyfriend Adam Scott at the island resort of Palma, Majorca after which Snezana Janković denounced Ivanovic in the Serbian press. Another high-profile controversy was after the pair's first meeting in two years in the second round of the 2010 Mutua Madrileña Madrid Open in Madrid where the match was marred however by an incident in which off court cameras appeared to catch Janković mocking Ivanovic's trademark fistpumps towards her mother and camp after the match. Janković admitted she found Ivanovic's fistpumps "irritating" but that it was not meant to be offensive and was in the heat of the moment. After their match in Indian Wells in 2011 however, Ivanovic stated she felt there were no real issues with Janković and both agreed that they have both put the past behind them, an opinion echoed again by Janković after their Australian Open encounter in 2013.

List of all matches

No.	Year	Tournament	Surface	Round	Winner	Score	Length	Ivanovic	Janković
1.	2005	(Switzerland) Zürich	Hard (i)	R16	Ivanovic	6–2, 6–1	0:51	1	0
2.	2006	(United States) Los Angeles	Hard	QF	Janković	6–4, 7–6^{(8–6)}	1:37	1	1
3.	2006	(Canada) Montréal	Hard	R16	Ivanovic	w/o	N/A	1	1
4.	2007	(Japan) Tokyo	Carpet (i)	QF	Ivanovic	3–6, 6–4, 6–2	1:42	2	1
5.	2007	(United States) Amelia Island	Clay	Final	Ivanovic	7–5, 6–3	1:28	3	1
6.	2007	(United States) Los Angeles	Hard	SF	Ivanovic	4–6, 6–3, 7–5	2:30	4	1
7.	2008	(United States) Indian Wells	Hard	SF	Ivanovic	7–6^{(7–3)}, 6–3	1:25	5	1
8.	2008	(France) French Open	Clay	SF	Ivanovic	6–4, 3–6, 6–4	2:15	6	1
9.	2008	(Qatar) Doha	Hard	Round robin	Janković	6–3, 6–4	1:29	6	2
10.	2010	(Spain) Madrid	Clay	R32	Janković	4–6, 6–4, 6–1	1:50	6	3
11.	2011	(United States) Indian Wells	Hard	R16	Ivanovic	6–4, 6–2	1:24	7	3
12.	2013	(Australia) Melbourne	Hard	R32	Ivanovic	7–5, 6–3	1:23	8	3
13.	2014	(Germany) Stuttgart	Clay	SF	Ivanovic	6–3, 7–5	1:28	9	3

=== Ivanovic vs. Kuznetsova ===
Ivanovic and Svetlana Kuznetsova have met 14 times since 2005, Ivanovic leading the head-to-head 11–3 overall. Ivanovic leads 7–2 on hard courts and 4–1 on clay.

The pair first met in the fourth round of the 2005 NASDAQ-100 Open, Ivanovic coming back from a 5–3 final set defeat to win and notch her first ever career Top 10 victory. Ivanovic has won all of their significant meetings including their only Grand Slam encounter at the 2007 French Open en route to her first Grand Slam final and both their final meetings, at the 2007 Qatar Telecom German Open in Berlin and the 2008 Pacific Life Open in Indian Wells. Kuznetsova's first victory over Ivanovic came at the 2006 Medibank International in Sydney, which remains her only win against Ivanovic in a WTA event, her other two coming both in Fed Cup encounters in 2008 and 2012.

List of all matches

No.	Year	Tournament	Surface	Round	Winner	Score
1.	2005	(United States) Miami	Hard	4R	Ivanovic	6–3, 3–6, 7–5
2.	2006	(Australia) Sydney	Hard	QF	Kuznetsova	7–6^{(7–3)}, 6–3
3.	2007	(Germany) Berlin	Clay	F	Ivanovic	3–6, 6–4, 7–6^{(7–4)}
4.	2007	(France) French Open	Clay	QF	Ivanovic	6–0, 3–6, 6–1
5.	2007	(Spain) Madrid	Hard (i)	Round Robin	Ivanovic	6–1, 4–6, 7–5
6.	2008	(United States) Indian Wells	Hard	F	Ivanovic	6–4, 6–3
7.	2010	(Serbia) Belgrade	Hard (i)	N/A	Kuznetsova	6–1, 6–4
8.	2011	(China) Beijing	Hard	2R	Ivanovic	6–2, 6–3
9.	2012	(Russia) Moscow	Clay (i)	N/A	Kuznetsova	6–2, 2–6, 6–4
10.	2012	(Italy) Rome	Clay	1R	Ivanovic	6–4, 6–3
11.	2013	(United States) Miami	Hard	3R	Ivanovic	6–3, 6–3
12.	2014	(Germany) Stuttgart	Clay	QF	Ivanovic	6–3, 2–6, 6–4
13.	2014	(United States) Cincinnati	Hard	3R	Ivanovic	6–2, 2–6, 6–3
14.	2015	(China) Beijing	Hard	3R	Ivanovic	7–5, 4–6, 6–2

=== Ivanovic vs. Sharapova ===
Ivanovic and Maria Sharapova have met 14 times, Sharapova leading the head-to-head 10–4. Sharapova leads 6–1 on hard courts and 4–2 on clay. Ivanovic leads 1–0 on carpet.

The pair first met at the 2006 Generali Ladies Linz which Sharapova won in straight sets. Ivanovic beat Sharapova at the 2007 French Open in straight sets easily to advance to her first Grand Slam final. They would meet again at a Grand Slam, this time in the 2008 Australian Open final dubbed the "Glam Slam" final which Sharapova won in straight sets. After that match the pair did not meet for more than four years until the 2012 BNP Paribas Open where Sharapova won after Ivanovic retired after winning the first game in the second set. Ivanovic would then lose the next four meetings that followed.

In 2014, Ivanovic defeated Sharapova for the first time since 2007 at the Rome Masters in straight sets. Their match at the Cincinnati Masters was a dramatic and controversial one. Ivanovic was up a set and a double break before a bad call was made that affected Ivanovic and allowed Sharapova back into the match to steal the second set. Then, in the third set, Ivanovic was up 1–0, 15–15 before she took a medical timeout, after which Sharapova took control of the set. Up 4–3 with a break, Sharapova double faulted on break point and sarcastically said to the umpire to "check her blood pressure" referring to the medical timeout that Ivanovic took earlier in the set. Sharapova broke right back to serve for the match. Sharapova had two match points but failed to convert both. Ivanovic would eventually prevail, recording her first win over Sharapova on the hard courts.

The pair did not need to wait long to meet in 2015, with both drawn as the top 2 seeds in the Brisbane International. Both players qualified for the final, but it was Sharapova who once again clinched victory on the hard courts, despite dropping the first set to Ivanovic in a tiebreak.

List of all matches

No.	Year	Tournament	Surface	Round	Winner	Score
1.	2006	(Austria) Linz	Hard (i)	QF	Sharapova	7–6^{(7–3)}, 7–5
2.	2007	(Japan) Tokyo	Carpet (i)	SF	Ivanovic	6–1, 0–1 ret.
3.	2007	(France) French Open	Clay	SF	Ivanovic	6–2, 6–1
4.	2007	(Spain) Madrid	Hard (i)	Round Robin	Sharapova	6–1, 6–2
5.	2008	(Australia) Melbourne	Hard	F	Sharapova	7–5, 6–3
6.	2012	(United States) Indian Wells	Hard	SF	Sharapova	6–4, 0–1 ret.
7.	2012	(Italy) Rome	Clay	3R	Sharapova	7–6^{(7–4)}, 6–3
8.	2013	(Germany) Stuttgart	Clay	QF	Sharapova	7–5, 4–6, 6–4
9.	2013	(Spain) Madrid	Clay	SF	Sharapova	6–4, 6–3
10.	2014	(Germany) Stuttgart	Clay	F	Sharapova	3–6, 6–4, 6–1
11.	2014	(Italy) Rome	Clay	3R	Ivanovic	6–1, 6–4
12.	2014	(United States) Cincinnati	Hard	SF	Ivanovic	6–2, 5–7, 7–5
13.	2014	(China) Beijing	Hard	SF	Sharapova	6–0, 6–4
14.	2015	(Australia) Brisbane	Hard	F	Sharapova	6–7^{(4–7)}, 6–3, 6–3

=== Ivanovic vs. Petrova ===
Ivanovic and Nadia Petrova have met 14 times since 2005, Ivanovic leading the head-to-head 9–5 overall. Ivanovic leads 4–2 on hard courts and 5–1 on clay. Petrova leads 1–0 on both grass and carpet.

The pair first met in the second round of the 2005 NASDAQ-100 Open with Ivanovic winning in straight sets. Later in the year, Petrova reached the semifinals of the French Open by defeating Ivanovic in straight sets in the quarterfinals. In the next two matches both players won one, and both were in a round of 16. Ivanovic won two significant matches in 2007. First, she beat Petrova in the 4th round of Wimbledon after a rollercoaster three set match. Later in the summer Ivanovic won in straight sets in their only meeting in a final, in Los Angeles. At that time, it was 4–2 for Ivanovic in their head-to-head, but Petrova won the next two meetings in two close matches to level the result. However, Ivanovic won five of the next six meetings, including the quarterfinals of the 2010 Internazionali BNL d'Italia when Petrova retired but after Ivanovic had won the first nine games, and the semifinals of the 2011 Commonwealth Bank Tournament of Champions in Bali, which Ivanovic won in straight sets.

List of all matches

No.	Year	Tournament	Surface	Round	Winner	Score
1.	2005	(United States) Miami	Hard	2R	Ivanovic	6–4, 7–5
2.	2005	(France) French Open	Clay	QF	Petrova	6–2, 6–2
3.	2006	(Belgium) Antwerp	Carpet	2R	Petrova	7–5, 6–3
4.	2007	(Australia) Sydney	Hard	2R	Ivanovic	6–2, 4–2 ret.
5.	2007	(United Kingdom) Wimbledon	Grass	4R	Ivanovic	6–1, 2–6, 6–4
6.	2007	(United States) Los Angeles	Hard	F	Ivanovic	7–5, 6–4
7.	2008	(Japan) Tokyo	Hard	2R	Petrova	6–1, 1–6, 6–2
8.	2009	(United Kingdom) Eastbourne	Grass	1R	Petrova	6–1, 4–6, 6–4
9.	2010	(Italy) Rome	Clay	QF	Ivanovic	6–2, 7–5
10.	2011	(Italy) Rome	Clay	1R	Ivanovic	6–0, 3–0 ret.
11.	2011	(United States) Cincinnati	Hard	2R	Petrova	6–3, 7–6^{(7–4)}
12.	2011	(Indonesia) Bali	Hard	SF	Ivanovic	6–1, 7–5
13.	2012	(Spain) Madrid	Clay	2R	Ivanovic	7–5, 6–1
14.	2013	(Germany) Stuttgart	Clay	2R	Ivanovic	6–4, 6–3

== Awards and honours ==
Ivanovic has won the following awards:

- Sony Ericsson WTA Tour most Improved player (2005)
- US Open Series champion 2006
- Serbian Sport Association "May Award" (2007)
- Sony Ericsson WTA Tour most Improved player (2007)
- Sony Ericsson WTA Tour Karen Krantzcke Sportsmanship Award (2007)
- Nominated for U.S. Secretary of State's 2007 International Women of Courage Award (2007)
- Sony Ericsson WTA Tour Diamond ACES Award (2008)
- German Tennis Magazine Michael Westphal Award 2008
- International Tennis Writer's Association Ambassador of the Year 2008
- Sony Ericsson WTA Tour Humanitarian Award (2009)
- Named one of the "30 Legends of Women's Tennis: Past, Present and Future" by Time magazine in June 2011
- Serbian Women's Team of The Year (2012, as part of Serbia Fed Cup team)
- Best Female Tennis Player in Serbia (2012)
- Award Pride of the Nation by Serbia Tennis Federation
- Order of Karađorđe's Star

== Career statistics ==
=== Grand Slam finals ===
==== Singles: 3 (1 title, 2 runner-ups) ====
Result	Year	Championship	Surface	Opponent	Score
Loss	2007	French Open	Clay	(Belgium) Justine Henin	1–6, 2–6
Loss	2008	Australian Open	Hard	(Russia) Maria Sharapova	5–7, 3–6
Win	2008	French Open	Clay	(Russia) Dinara Safina	6–4, 6–3

== Performance timelines ==
Key
W	F	SF	QF	#R	RR	Q#	DNQ	A	NH

(W) winner; (F) finalist; (SF) semifinalist; (QF) quarterfinalist; (#R) rounds 4, 3, 2, 1; (RR) round-robin stage; (Q#) qualification round; (DNQ) did not qualify; (A) absent; (NH) not held; (SR) strike rate (events won / competed); (W–L) win–loss record.

=== Singles ===
Tournament	2003	2004	2005	2006	2007	2008	2009	2010	2011	2012	2013	2014	2015	2016	SR	W–L
Grand Slam tournaments
Australian Open	–	–	3R	2R	3R	F	3R	2R	1R	4R	4R	QF	1R	3R	0 / 12	26–12
French Open	–	–	QF	3R	F	W	4R	2R	1R	3R	4R	3R	SF	3R	1 / 12	37–11
Wimbledon	–	–	3R	4R	SF	3R	4R	1R	3R	4R	2R	3R	2R	1R	0 / 12	24–12
US Open	–	Q1	2R	3R	4R	2R	1R	4R	4R	QF	4R	2R	1R	1R	0 / 12	20–12
Win–loss	0–0	0–0	9–4	8–4	16–4	16–3	8–4	5–4	4–4	12–4	10–4	9–4	6–4	4–4	1 / 48	107–47
Year-end championships
WTA Finals	–	–	–	–	SF	RR	–	–	–	–	–	RR	–		0 / 3	4–5
Career statistics
Titles–finals	0–0	0–0	1–1	1–1	3–5	3–4	0–1	2–2	1–1	0–0	0–1	4–6	0–1	0–0	N/A	15–23
Overall win–loss	12–5	37–5	40–14	35–18	51–18	38–15	24–14	33–20	32–20	37–21	40–23	58–17	28–19	15–16	N/A	467–212
Year-end ranking	705	97	16	14	4	5	22	17	22	13	16	5	16	63	–	

=== Doubles ===
Tournament	2005	2006	2007	2011	SR	W–L
Grand Slam tournaments
Australian Open	A	A	A	A	0 / 0	0–0
French Open	1R	A	1R	A	0 / 2	0–2
Wimbledon	3R	1R	1R	2R	0 / 4	3–4
US Open	A	3R	A	A	0 / 1	2–1
Win–loss	2–2	2–2	0–2	1–1	0 / 7	5–7

== Personal life ==
Ivanovic's inspiration to begin playing was Monica Seles, who at that time played for Yugoslavia. In 2010, Ivanovic adopted Basel as her home away-from-home. She spent her spare time training and relaxing there and was quoted as saying she "appreciates Swiss solitude" and "I enjoy training here, especially in the summer."

Aside from her tennis career, she also studied finance at a university in Belgrade, and Spanish in her spare time. On 8 September 2007, Ivanovic became a UNICEF National Ambassador for Serbia, alongside Aleksandar Đorđević, Jelena Janković, Emir Kusturica and Novak Djokovic. She takes a special interest in the fields of education and child protection. Ivanovic visited a primary school in Serbia during her inauguration and said that she is "also looking forward to going into the classroom and meeting many kids".

In September 2014, Ivanovic began a relationship with German professional footballer Bastian Schweinsteiger. They married on 12 July 2016, in Venice with Ana taking his surname (Serbian: Швајнштајгер / Švajnštajger). In 2018 she announced the birth of a baby boy in Chicago. In 2019, she gave birth to their second son. On February 10, 2023, Ivanovic announced on her Instagram she was expecting her third child. In May 2023, Ivanovic revealed on her Instagram page that she gave birth to her third child. The announcement was done through a joint social media post with her husband.

In April 2025, German magazine Bunte announced that Ivanović and Schweinsteiger had decided to end their marriage. According to the magazine, they had been separated for more than two months, and Ivanović had moved to Belgrade with their children, while Schweinsteiger had settled in Munich. Schweinsteiger's PR manager told Bild that Schweinsteiger and Ivanović would not comment on their private life, and they pleaded for understanding. Ivanović's lawyer confirmed the breakup in July 2025.

== Video games ==
Ivanovic has appeared as a character in Smash Court Tennis 3, released in 2007, Virtua Tennis 2009, released in 2009, Grand Slam Tennis for Wii, also released in 2009, Top Spin 4 and Virtua Tennis 4 both released in 2011. She is also featured in Grand Slam Tennis 2, released in 2012. She stars, among others, alongside Novak Djokovic, Roger Federer, Rafael Nadal, Lindsay Davenport, Anna Chakvetadze, Venus Williams and Maria Sharapova.

== Other ventures ==
Ivanovic appeared in a number of international magazines like FHM (Germany, United Kingdom, Australia), Vanity Fair (Spain), Cosmopolitan (Serbia), Vanidades (Mexico), Grazia (Serbia), The Best Shop (Serbia), Sports Illustrated (South Africa) and Harper's Bazaar (Serbia). In early 2017, Ivanovic announced she was joining tennis technology company PlaySight Interactive as a brand ambassador.

== See also ==
- Tennis performance timeline comparison (women) (1978–present)
- List of Grand Slam women's singles champions
- List of UNICEF Goodwill Ambassadors
- Sports in Serbia

Sporting positions
Preceded by Maria Sharapova; Jelena Janković	World No. 1 June 9, 2008 – August 10, 2008; August 18, 2008 – September 7, 2008	Succeeded by Jelena Janković; Serena Williams
Preceded by Kim Clijsters	US Open Series Champion; 2006	Succeeded by Maria Sharapova
Awards
Preceded by Maria Sharapova; Jelena Janković	WTA Most Improved Player; 2005; 2007	Succeeded by Jelena Janković; Dinara Safina
Preceded by Kim Clijsters	Karen Krantczke Sportsmanship Award; 2007	Succeeded by Elena Dementieva
Preceded by Jelena Janković	WTA Diamond Aces; 2008	Succeeded by Elena Dementieva
Preceded by Liezel Huber	WTA Humanitarian of the Year; 2008	Succeeded by Maria Sharapova
