= Gil Reyes (tennis) =

American fitness trainer (born 1952)

- Born: 1952 (age 73–74)
- Occupation: Fitness trainer (tennis)

Gil Reyes (born 1952) is an American fitness trainer who spent seventeen years as the strength and conditioning trainer for retired tennis player Andre Agassi, from 1989 until Agassi's retirement in 2006. He was also considered one of Agassi's closest friends and confidants.

== Trainer and friend ==
Gil Reyes was the strength and conditioning coach for the basketball program at the University of Nevada, Las Vegas before meeting Agassi in 1989. Reyes was their strength coach when they won the 1990 NCAA championships.

After Agassi lost in the fourth round of the 1998 US Open, he and Reyes recommitted to the training regimen they had established. Soon after returning to Las Vegas, Reyes asked Agassi for the first time to run up and down a 320-yard hill that Reyes calls "Magic Mountain". The story has become an oft-repeated story of Agassi's commitment and Reyes's motivation. This retooled training regime entailed two hours of court practice, followed by two hours of weight training and then to "Magic Mountain" for a series of sprints. It is believed that Agassi's late career revival would not have been possible without this training regime. Agassi himself said in 2005, at the age of 35, "Gil is the reason why I've won more Slams after the age of 29 than I did before. He's the reason why I'm still out there playing this sport at a time in my life when I can really understand and appreciate it."

Reyes's approach transformed Agassi into a well-conditioned strong athlete. When they first began working together Agassi could bench press 135 pounds. Fourteen years later in 2003, he was benchpressing 350 lbs. Reyes described his job as being "to get [Agassi] to be as good to himself as he is to others." The relationship between Reyes and Agassi was so close that Reyes was sometimes called "the core" of Agassi's team of advisors, friends and family.

Reyes's contributions to Agassi's success were often overlooked in favor of the contributions of coaches like Brad Gilbert.

In 2001, Agassi named his child Jaden Gil Agassi after his trainer and friend.

== After Agassi ==
Gil Reyes currently runs the Gil Reyes Fitness Center in Las Vegas. Gil Reyes and Adidas have a contract under which he helps train young athletes, such as Fernando Verdasco, Sorana Cîrstea, Sania Mirza and Sam Querrey; the program is officially called the Adidas Player Development program. The training employed by Reyes consists of the same combination used for Andre Agassi- a combination of court practice, weight training and runs up "Magic Mountain". Gil Reyes was credited by Fernando Verdasco for his improved fitness and career-best run to the Australian Open semifinals in January 2009.
