= 2015 WTA Awards =

Details

Achievements (singles)

Awards
- Player of the year: (United States) Serena Williams
- Most improved player of the year: (Switzerland) Timea Bacsinszky
- Newcomer of the year: (Russia) Daria Gavrilova
- Comeback player of the year: (United States) Venus Williams

The 2015 WTA Awards are a series of awards given by the Women's Tennis Association to players who have achieved something remarkable during the 2015 WTA Tour.

== The awards ==
These awards are decided by either the media, the players, the association, or the fans. Nominees were announced by the WTA's Twitter account.

Note: award winners in bold

=== Player of the Year ===
- (Spain) Garbiñe Muguruza
- (Italy) Flavia Pennetta
- (Poland) Agnieszka Radwańska
- (United States) **Serena Williams**

=== Doubles Team of the Year ===
- (Australia) Casey Dellacqua & (Kazakhstan) Yaroslava Shvedova
- **(Switzerland)** Martina Hingis & (India) Sania Mirza
- (Russia) Ekaterina Makarova & (Russia) Elena Vesnina
- (United States) Bethanie Mattek-Sands & (Czech Republic) Lucie Šafářová

=== Most Improved Player of the Year ===
- (Switzerland) **Timea Bacsinszky**
- (Switzerland) Belinda Bencic
- (United Kingdom) Johanna Konta
- (Czech Republic) Karolína Plíšková
- (Slovakia) Anna Karolina Schmiedlova

=== Newcomer of the Year ===
- (Russia) Margarita Gasparyan
- (Russia) **Daria Gavrilova**
- (Japan) Nao Hibino
- (Russia) Darya Kasatkina

=== Comeback Player of the Year ===
- (Ukraine) Kateryna Bondarenko
- (United States) Bethanie Mattek-Sands
- (Latvia) Anastasija Sevastova
- (United States) **Venus Williams**

=== Karen Krantzcke Sportsmanship Award ===
- (Czech Republic) **Petra Kvitová**

=== Peachy Kellmeyer Player Service Award ===
- (Czech Republic) **Lucie Šafářová**

=== Diamond Aces ===
- (Denmark) **Caroline Wozniacki**

=== Fan Favourite Player ===
- (United States) Serena Williams
- (India) Sania Mirza
- (Romania) Simona Halep
- (Spain) Garbiñe Muguruza
- (Russia) Maria Sharapova
- (Poland) **Agnieszka Radwańska**
- (Czech Republic) Petra Kvitová
- (United States) Venus Williams
- (Czech Republic) Lucie Šafářová
- (Germany) Angelique Kerber
- (Czech Republic) Karolína Plíšková
- (Switzerland) Belinda Bencic
- (Serbia) Ana Ivanovic
- (Denmark) Caroline Wozniacki
- (United States) Madison Keys
- (Ukraine) Elina Svitolina
- (Italy) Sara Errani
- (Serbia) Jelena Janković
- (Belarus) Victoria Azarenka
- (Russia) Ekaterina Makarova
- (Germany) Andrea Petkovic
- (Germany) Sabine Lisicki
- (Slovakia) Dominika Cibulková
- (France) Alizé Cornet
- (Canada) Eugenie Bouchard

=== Womance of the Year ===
- (Switzerland) Belinda Bencic & (France) Kristina Mladenovic
- (Spain) Garbiñe Muguruza & (Spain) Carla Suárez Navarro
- (Switzerland) Martina Hingis & (India) Sania Mirza
- (Italy) Flavia Pennetta & (Italy) Roberta Vinci
- (United States) **Serena Williams & (Denmark) Caroline Wozniacki**
- (United States) Bethanie Mattek-Sands & (Czech Republic) Lucie Šafářová

=== Post of the Year ===
- (United States) **Serena Williams**
- (Romania) Simona Halep
- (Poland) Agnieszka Radwańska
- (Spain) Garbiñe Muguruza
- (Denmark) Caroline Wozniacki

=== Selfie of the Year ===
- (Germany) Andrea Petkovic
- (United States) Serena Williams
- (Serbia) **Ana Ivanovic**
- (Belarus) Victoria Azarenka
- (Czech Republic) Petra Kvitová

=== #TBT (Throwback Thursday) of the Year ===
- (Russia) Maria Sharapova
- (United States) **Venus Williams**
- (Belarus) Victoria Azarenka
- (Canada) Eugenie Bouchard
- (United Kingdom) Heather Watson

=== LOL of the Year ===
- (Russia) **Maria Sharapova**
- (Denmark) Caroline Wozniacki
- (Serbia) Ana Ivanovic
- (United States) Venus Williams
- (Czech Republic) Petra Kvitová

=== AWW of the Year ===
- (Serbia) Ana Ivanovic
- (Belarus) Victoria Azarenka
- (Russia) Maria Sharapova
- (United States) **Serena Williams**
- (Poland) Agnieszka Radwańska

=== Fan Favourite WTA Video of the Year ===
- WTA Live Fan Access | Serena Williams vs Caroline Wozniacki
- **WTA Emojis**()
- WTA RacquetSabers
- WTA Live Fan Access | Genie Bouchard Big Bang Theory Quiz
- Canadian or Not Canadian

=== Fan Favorite WTA Shot of the Year ===
- (Poland) Agnieszka Radwańska, 2015 Miami Open third round (18%)
- (Germany) Angelique Kerber, 2015 Stuttgart Open first round (6%)
- (Romania) Simona Halep, 2015 Rogers Cup semifinal (34%)
- **(Poland) Agnieszka Radwańska, 2015 WTA Finals final (42%)**()

=== Fan Favorite WTA Match of the Year ===
- (Russia) Maria Sharapova vs. (Serbia) Ana Ivanovic, Brisbane final
- (Czech Republic) Petra Kvitová vs. (Czech Republic) Karolína Plíšková, Sydney final
- (United States) Serena Williams vs. (Romania) Simona Halep, Miami semifinal
- (Germany) Angelique Kerber vs. (United States) Madison Keys, Charleston final
- (Germany) Angelique Kerber vs. (Denmark) Caroline Wozniacki, Stuttgart final
- (United States) Serena Williams vs. (Belarus) Victoria Azarenka, Madrid third round
- (Germany) Angelique Kerber vs. (Czech Republic) Karolína Plíšková, Birmingham final
- (Germany) Angelique Kerber vs. (Poland) Agnieszka Radwańska, Stanford quarterfinal
- (Switzerland) Belinda Bencic vs. (United States) Serena Williams, Toronto semifinal
- (Poland) **Agnieszka Radwańska vs. (Spain) Garbiñe Muguruza, WTA Finals semifinal (6–7, 6–3, 7–5)**()

=== Fan Favorite Grand Slam Match of the Year ===
- (Slovakia) Dominika Cibulková vs. (Belarus) Victoria Azarenka, Australian Open fourth round
- (United States) Serena Williams vs. (Russia) Maria Sharapova, Australian Open final
- (Italy) Francesca Schiavone vs. (Russia) Svetlana Kuznetsova, French Open second round
- (United States) Serena Williams vs. (Czech Republic) Lucie Šafářová, French Open final
- (United States) Serena Williams vs. (United Kingdom) Heather Watson, Wimbledon third round
- (Spain) Garbiñe Muguruza vs. (Poland) Agnieszka Radwańska, Wimbledon semifinal
- (Belarus) **Victoria Azarenka vs. (Germany) Angelique Kerber, US Open third round (7–5, 2–6, 6–4)**()
- (United States) Serena Williams vs. (United States) Venus Williams, US Open quarterfinal

=== Best Dressed on-court ===
- (United States) Sloane Stephens, Wimbledon
- (Poland) **Agnieszka Radwańska, Toronto**
- (Russia) Maria Sharapova, French Open
- (United States) Bethanie Mattek-Sands, US Open
- (Serbia) Ana Ivanovic, US Open
- (United States) Serena Williams, Australian Open
- (Romania) Simona Halep, Toronto
- (United States) Venus Williams, Miami
- (Denmark) Caroline Wozniacki, Dubai
- (Belarus) Victoria Azarenka, US Open

=== Best Dressed off-court ===
- (Russia) Maria Sharapova, WTA Finals Draw Ceremony
- (Canada) Eugenie Bouchard, WTA Pre-Wimbledon Party
- (United States) Serena Williams, Wimbledon Champions Dinner
- (Romania) **Simona Halep, Iconic Player Party in Paris**
- (Spain) Garbiñe Muguruza, WTA Finals Draw Ceremony
- (Serbia) Ana Ivanovic, WTA Pre-Wimbledon Party
- (Denmark) Caroline Wozniacki, ESPYS
