= 2015 WTA Finals =

- Date: October 25 – November 1
- Edition: 45th (singles) / 40th (doubles)
- Draw: 8S / 8D
- Surface: Hard (indoor)
- Location: Singapore
- Venue: Singapore Indoor Stadium

Champions

Singles
- (Poland) Agnieszka Radwańska

Doubles
- (Switzerland) Martina Hingis / (India) Sania Mirza
- WTA Finals

The 2015 WTA Finals was a women's tennis tournament at Singapore. It was the 45th edition of the singles event and the 40th edition of the doubles competition. The tournament was contested by eight singles players and eight doubles teams. The tournament was the year-end final of the 2015 WTA Tour.

== Finals ==
Singles

- (Poland) Agnieszka Radwańska defeated (Czech Republic) Petra Kvitová 6–2, 4–6, 6–3.

Doubles

- (Switzerland) Martina Hingis / (India) Sania Mirza defeated (Spain) Garbiñe Muguruza / (Spain) Carla Suárez Navarro 6–0, 6–3.

== Tournament ==
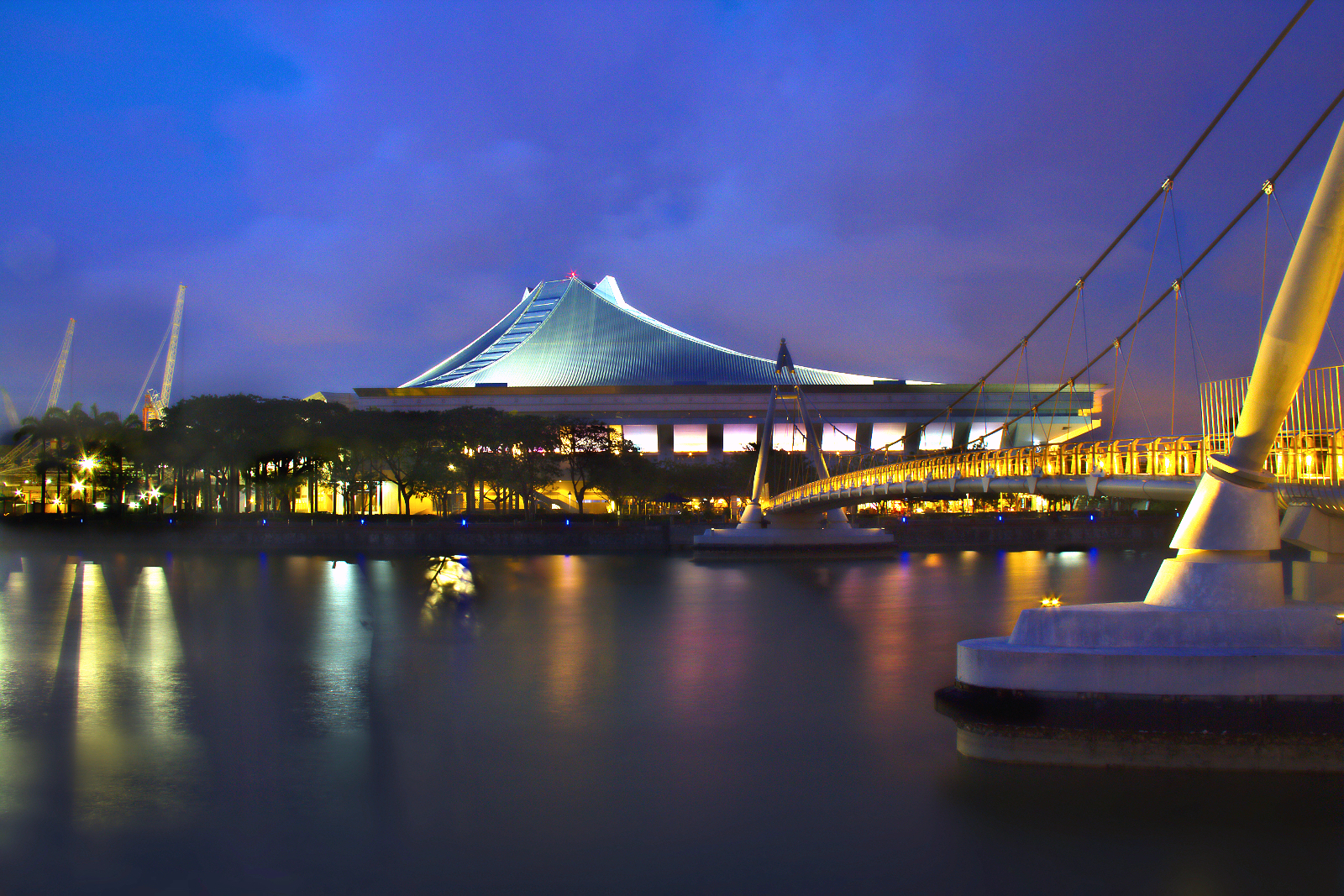
Singapore Indoor Stadium hosted the WTA Finals for the first time in 2014.

The 2015 WTA Finals took place at the Singapore Indoor Stadium from 26 October to 1 November 2015, and was the 45th edition of the event. The tournament was run by the Women's Tennis Association (WTA) as part of the 2015 WTA Tour. Singapore is now the ninth city to host the WTA Finals since its inauguration in 1972 and will host the event for at least five years. The event also held two exhibition tournaments, WTA Rising Stars Invitational and the WTA Legends Classic.

=== Qualifying ===
In singles, point totals are calculated by combining point totals from sixteen tournaments. Of these sixteen tournaments, a player's results from the four Grand Slam events, the four Premier Mandatory tournaments, and the best results from two Premier 5 tournaments must be included.
In doubles, point totals are calculated by any combination of eleven tournaments throughout the year. Unlike in singles, this combination does not need to include results from the Grand Slams or Premier-level tournaments.

=== Format ===
The singles and doubles event features eight players in a round robin event, split into two groups of four. Over the first four days of competition, each player meets the other three players in her group, with the top two in each group advancing to the semifinals. The first-placed player in one group meets the second-placed player in the other group, and vice versa. The winners of each semifinal meet in the championship match.

==== Round robin tie-breaking methods ====
The final standings of each group were determined by the first of the following methods that applied:

1. Greatest number of wins.
2. Greatest number of matches played.
3. Head-to-head results if only two players are tied, or if three players are tied then:

a. If three players each have the same number of wins, a player having played less than all three matches is automatically eliminated and the player advancing to the single elimination competition is the winner of the match-up of the two remaining tied players.
b. Highest percentage of sets won.
c. Highest percentage of games won.

=== Exhibition ===
Rising Stars

- (Japan) Naomi Osaka defeated (France) Caroline Garcia, 3–5, 5–4^{(8–6)}, 4–1.

Legends

- Winner: (United States) Martina Navratilova
- Runner-up: (Spain) Arantxa Sánchez Vicario

== Prize money and points ==
The total prize money for the BNP Paribas 2015 WTA Finals was US$7,000,000.

Stage	Singles	Doubles	Points
Champion	RR^{1} + $1,750,000	RR + $350,000	RR + 810
Runner-up	RR + $590,000	RR + $110,000	RR + 360
Semifinalist	RR + $40,000	RR + $7,500	RR
Round robin win per match	+$153,000	+$25,000	+230
Round robin loss per match	—N/a	—N/a	+70
Participation Fee	3 matches = $151,000; 2 matches = $130,000; 1 match = $110,000	3 matches = $75,000; 2 matches = $60,000; 1 match = $50,000	—N/a
Alternates	2 matches = $109,000; 1 match = $89,000; 0 matches = $68,000	2 matches = $50,500; 1 match = $35,000; 0 matches = $25,000	—N/a

- ^{1} RR means prize money or points won in the round robin round.

== Qualified players ==
=== Singles ===
#	Players	Points	Tourn	Date Qualified
withdrew	(United States) Serena Williams	9,945	14	6 July
1	(Romania) Simona Halep	5,790	17	4 September
2	(Spain) Garbiñe Muguruza	4,511	19	8 October
3	(Russia) Maria Sharapova	4,322	16	10 September
4	(Czech Republic) Petra Kvitová	3,491	18	14 October
5	(Poland) Agnieszka Radwańska	3,425	23	18 October
6	(Germany) Angelique Kerber	3,400	24	21 October
7	(Italy) Flavia Pennetta	3,252	19	21 October
8	(Czech Republic) Lucie Šafářová	3,221	21	22 October

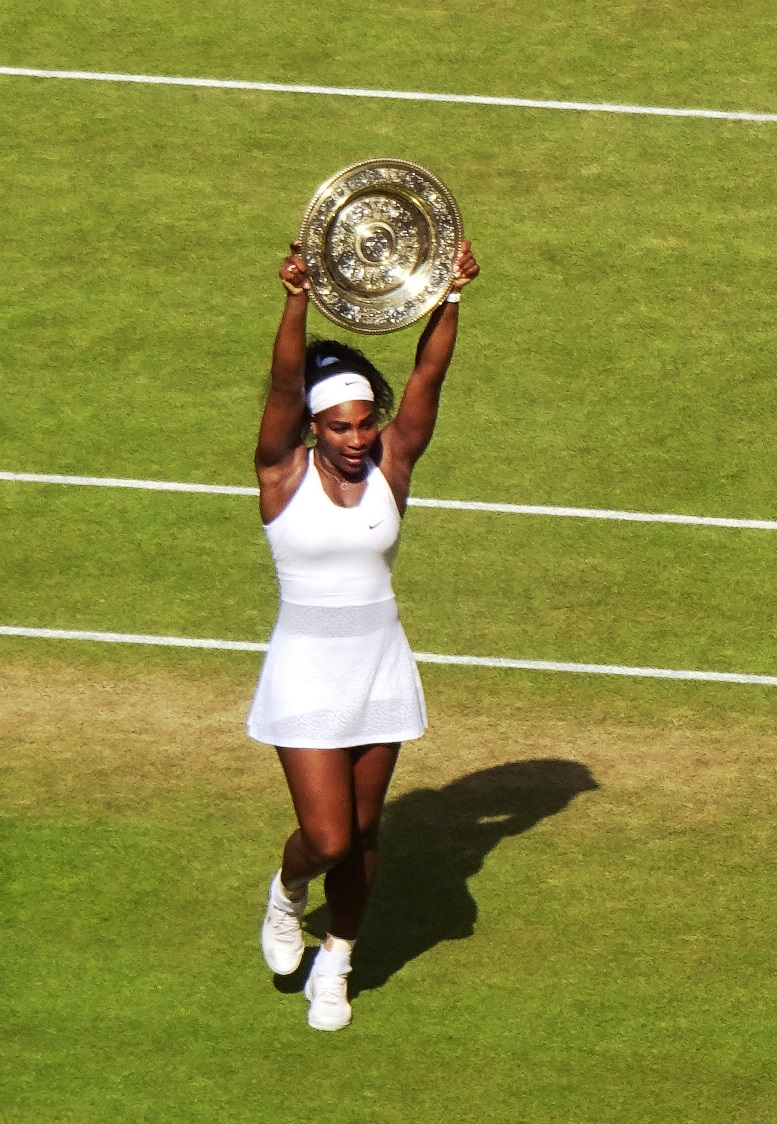
Serena Williams won three Grand Slam titles in 2015.

On 6 July, Serena Williams became the first player to qualify for the Championships. However, she announced her withdrawal on 2 October.

In 2015, Serena Williams decided to start her season at the exhibition event in Perth, at the Hopman Cup teaming up with John Isner, losing in the final to the Polish pairing of Agnieszka Radwańska and Jerzy Janowicz. At the Australian Open, Williams claimed her 19th slam defeating Maria Sharapova, putting her 2nd in the most slams won in the Open Era. Williams ended her 14-year boycott of the BNP Paribas Open but withdrew prior to her semifinal match. She then claimed her eighth Miami Open title defeating Carla Suárez Navarro in just 56 minutes in the final after winning a tough three-set semifinal match against Simona Halep. She then reached the final of the French Open and claimed her 20th slam defeating Lucie Šafářová in three sets, making her only the second person to win each slam three times. She backed it up by winning her 6th Wimbledon title against Garbiñe Muguruza to become the first person to win three slams six times and first player since Steffi Graf to win the first three slams of the year. Williams returned from an elbow injury in Toronto but was shocked by Swiss teen Belinda Bencic in the semifinals. She then claimed her fifth title of the year at the Western & Southern Open defeating Simona Halep. At the US Open, Williams had a chance to win the calendar Grand Slam but was upset by Roberta Vinci in three sets in the semifinals. Williams was the three-time defending champion, but on October 2, Williams withdrew from the tournament to recapture her motivation.

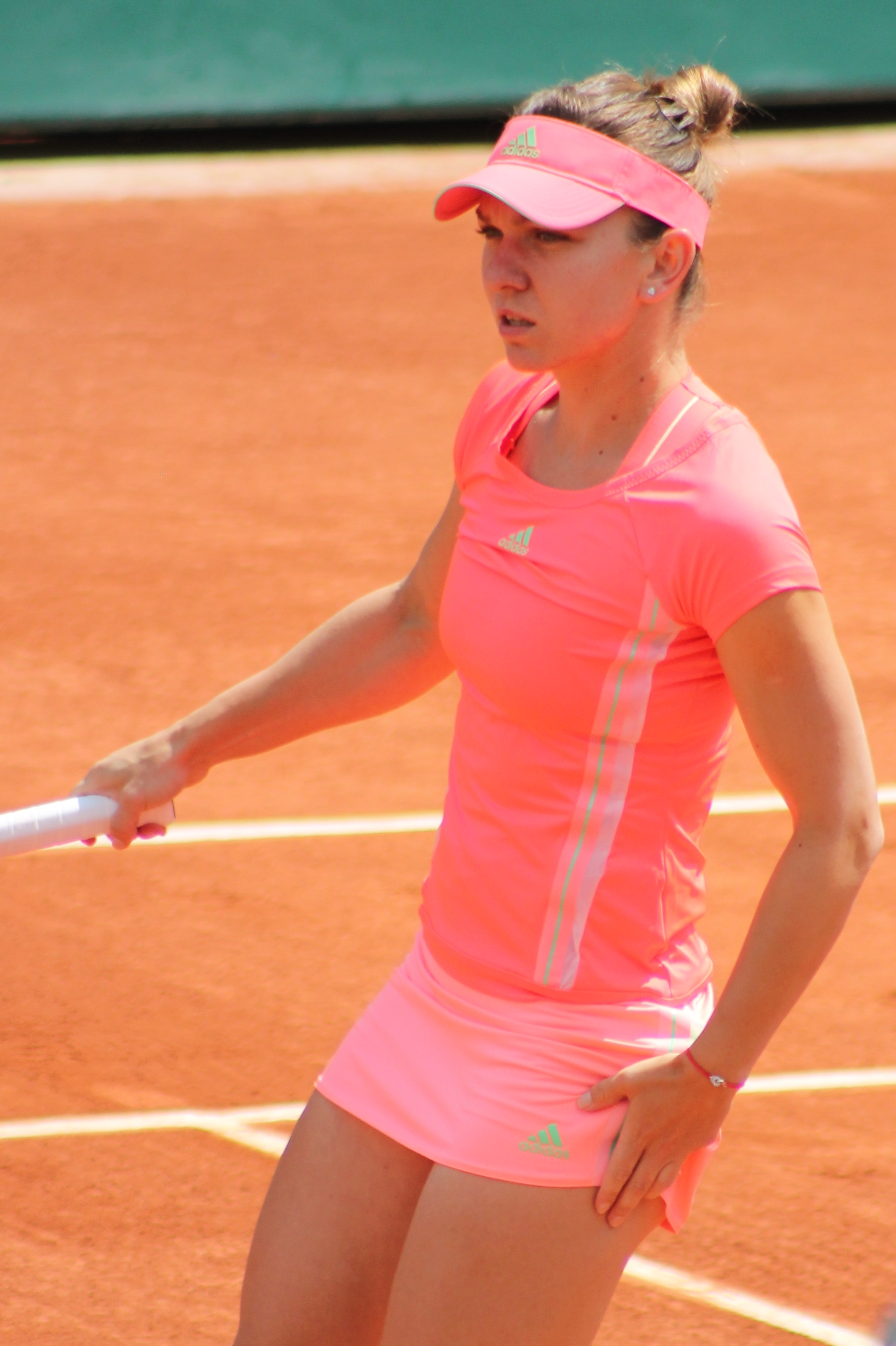
Simona Halep won the biggest title of her career at Indian Wells.

On 4 September, Simona Halep became the second player to qualify after her second round win at the US Open.

Simona Halep began the year by winning the Shenzhen Open over Timea Bacsinszky. She then reached the quarterfinals of the Australian Open but lost to Ekaterina Makarova in straight sets. She won her second title of the year at the Dubai Tennis Championships defeating Karolína Plíšková in the final. She won the biggest title of her career at the BNP Paribas Open defeating Jelena Janković in the final. However, Halep suffered a dip in form losing to Mirjana Lučić-Baroni in the second round of the French Open and a first-round loss at Wimbledon to Jana Čepelová. Halep rebounded at the US Open Series by reaching back-to-back finals at Toronto and Cincinnati, retiring against Belinda Bencic and losing to Serena Williams, respectively. Halep reached the semifinals of the US Open but was upset by eventual champion Flavia Pennetta. This is the second time Halep has qualified for the Year-End Championships.

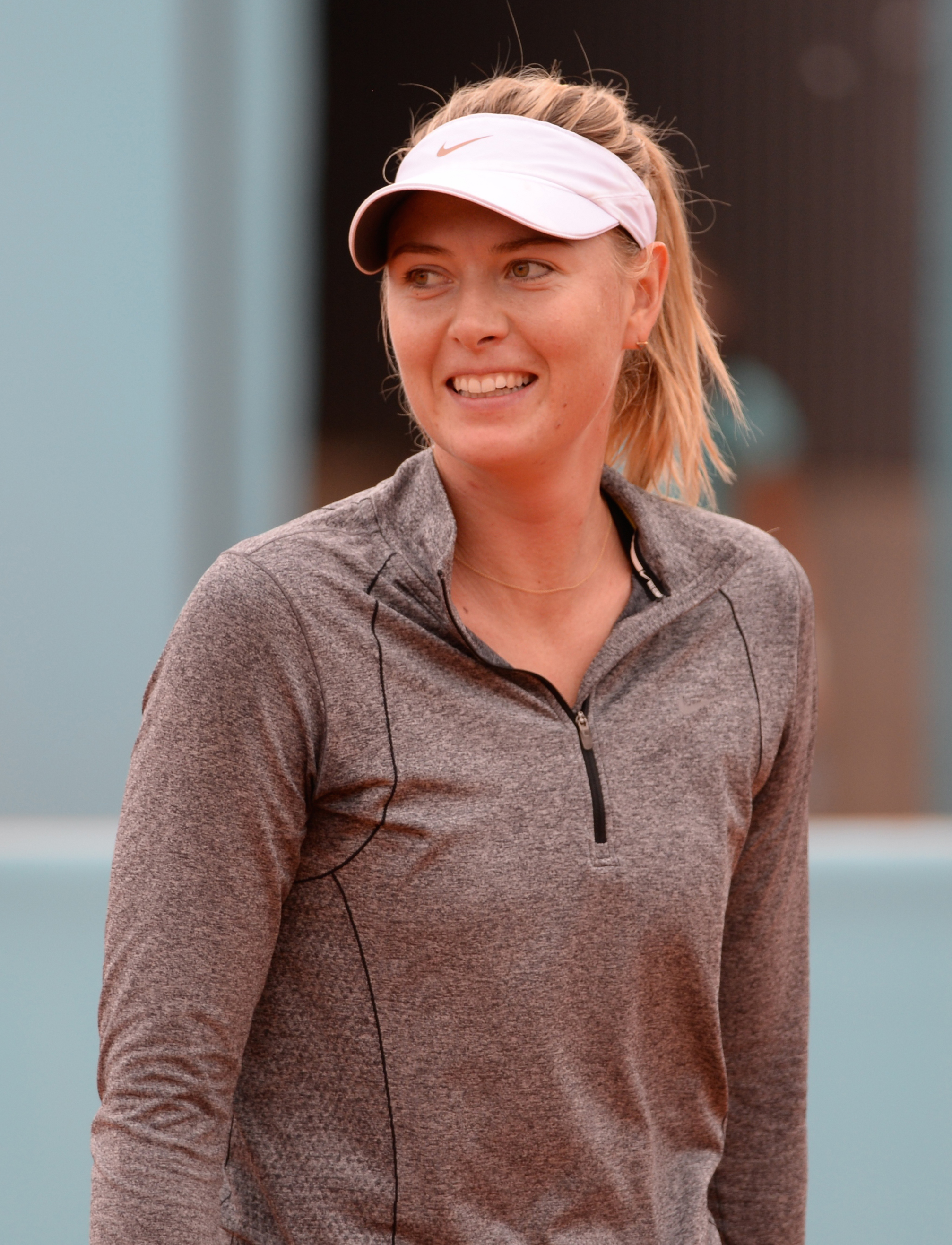
Maria Sharapova reached the final of the Australian Open.

Maria Sharapova was announced as the third qualifier on 10 September.

Maria Sharapova started the year strongly by winning in Brisbane with a win over Ana Ivanovic in the final. At the Australian Open Sharapova saved two match points to beat Alexandra Panova and the second round and went on to reach the final, where she lost to Serena Williams in straight sets. After the Australian Open, a leg strain hampered Sharapova as she suffered three straight early exits to Flavia Pennetta in Indian Wells, Daria Gavrilova in Miami and Angelique Kerber in Stuttgart, where Sharapova was the three-time defending champion. Sharapova rebounded by reaching the semifinals of Madrid, losing to Svetlana Kuznetsova and winning Rome, beating Carla Suárez Navarro in the final. However, this success did not carry over into the French Open where as the defending champion she lost in the fourth round to eventual finalist Lucie Šafářová. Sharapova then reached the semifinals of Wimbledon, losing once again to Williams in straight sets. Sharapova withdrew from the US Open Series, she returned at Wuhan, but had to retire from her opening match against Barbora Strýcová with a left forearm strain. She subsequently withdrew from Beijing to give herself time to recover for Singapore. This marks the 8th time Sharapova has qualified for the Championships.

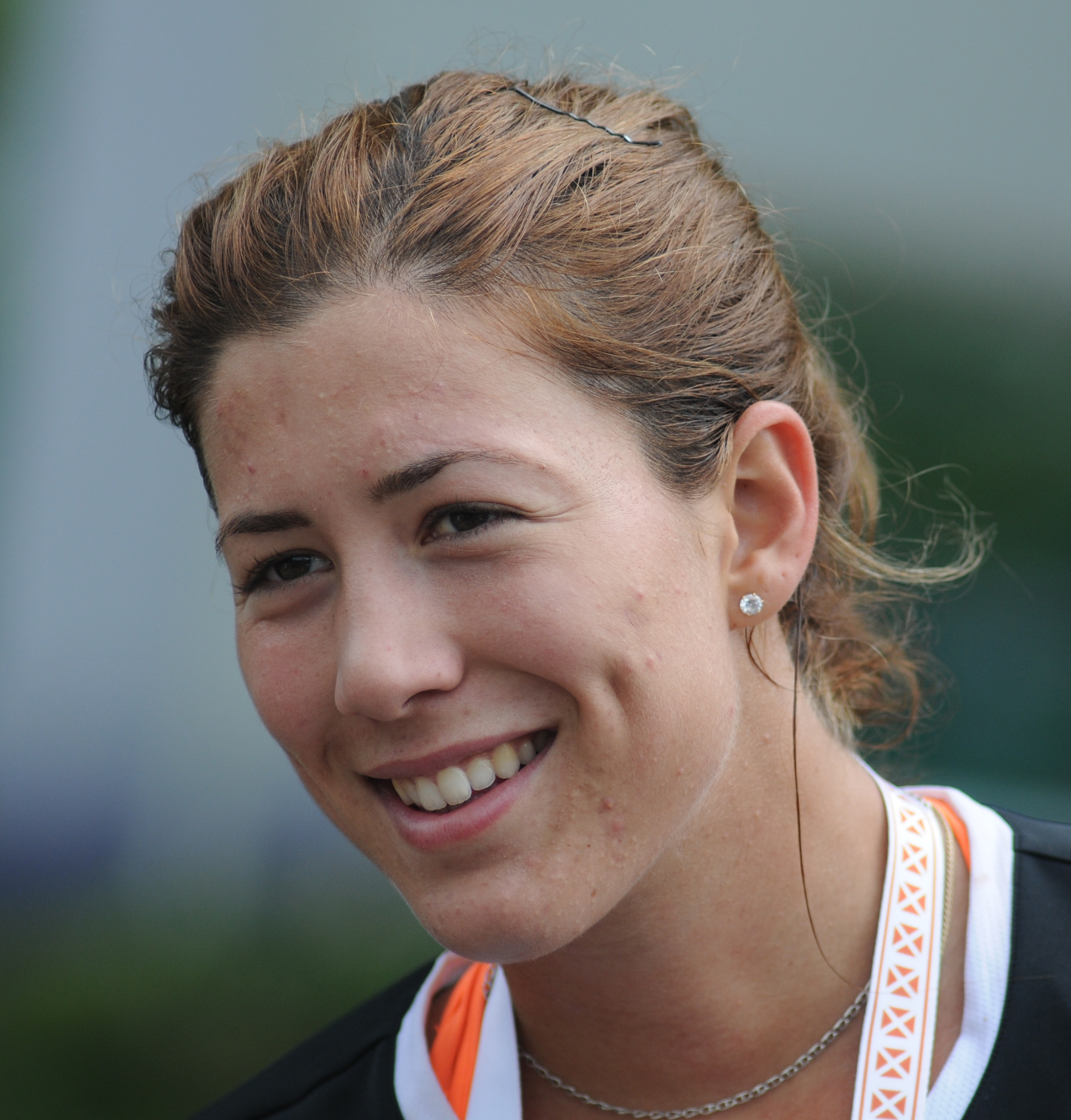
Garbiñe Muguruza reached her first Grand Slam final at Wimbledon.

Garbiñe Muguruza became the fourth player to qualify on 8 October following her round of 16 win at the China Open.

Garbiñe Muguruza started 2015 ranked outside the top 20, but she will be the #2 seed at the WTA Finals. Muguruza lost in the quarterfinals of Sydney to Angelique Kerber and the fourth round Australian Open to Serena Williams. Muguruza then reached her first Premier 5 semifinal in Dubai, where she lost to Karolína Plíšková. She failed to win back-to-back matches until the French Open, where she reached the quarterfinals, losing to Lucie Šafářová. At the Wimbledon, Muguruza reached her first Grand Slam final by defeating losing 6–4, 6–4 to Serena Williams. After Wimbledon, Muguruza lost her opening matches in Toronto and Cincinnati. After Cincinnati, Muguruza split with her longtime coach, Alejo Mancisidor. He was replaced by Sam Sumyk. Muguruza lost in the second round of the US Open to Johanna Konta. However, she rebounded in Asia by reaching the final of Wuhan, retiring against Venus Williams and winning her biggest title to date at the China Open where she overcame Timea Bacsinszky in the final in straight sets. This year's Championships is Muguruza's singles debut.

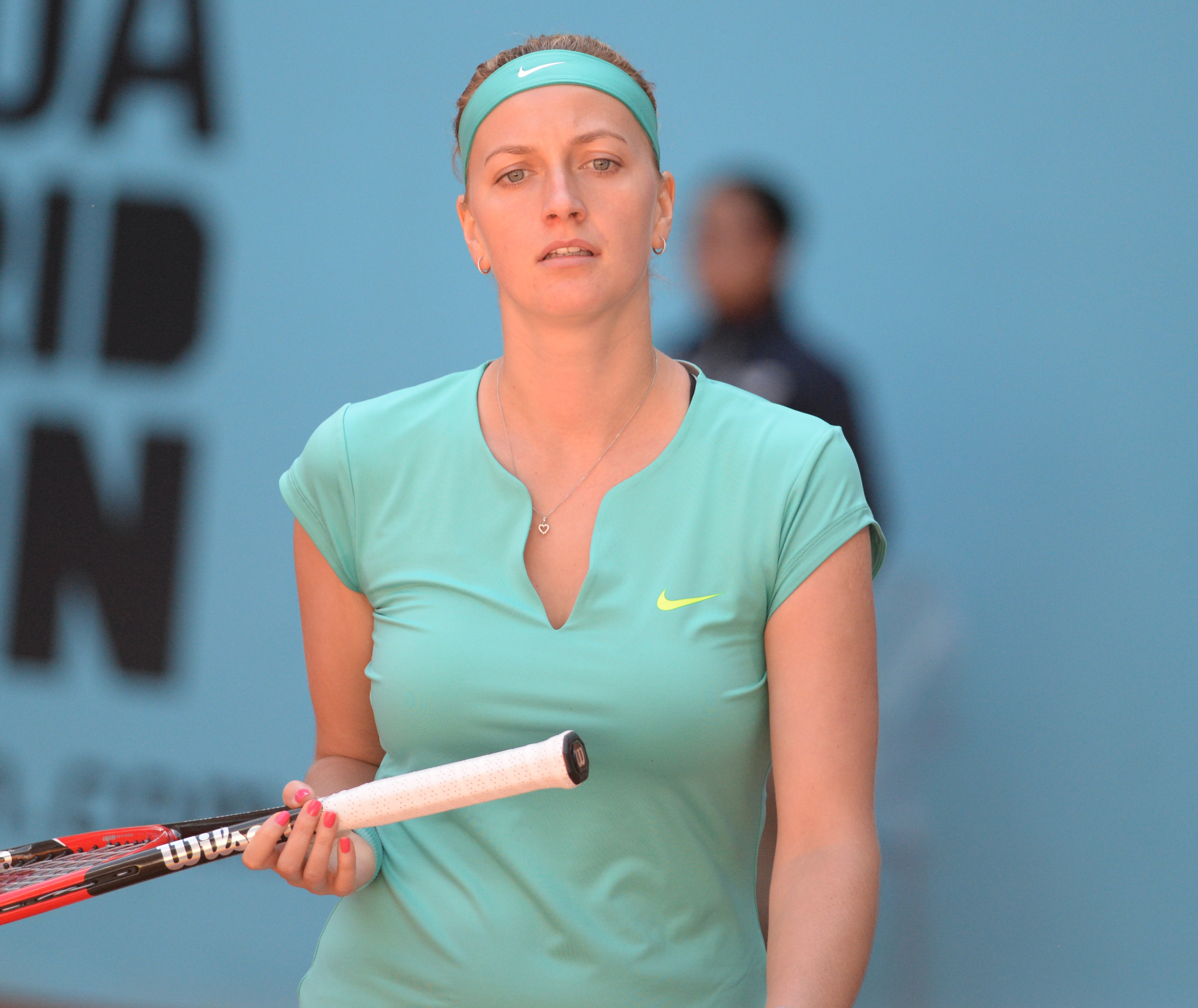
Petra Kvitová was the one of only three players to beat World No. 1 Serena Williams in 2015.

Petra Kvitová was announced as the fifth qualifier on 14 October.

Petra Kvitová qualified for the Championships for the fifth straight year despite struggling with mononucleosis for most of the 2015 season. She began the year reaching the semifinals in Shenzhen and claiming her 15th career title by beating compatriot Karolína Plíšková in the final of Sydney. However, she was upset in the third round of the Australian Open by young American Madison Keys. She then withdrew from Indian Wells and Miami, citing exhaustion. On clay, Kvitová fell early to Madison Brengle in Stuttgart but less than two weeks later, she beat Serena Williams for the first time in her career en route to winning the title at Madrid. She then made the quarterfinals in Rome, and the fourth round of the French Open. At Wimbledon, defending champion Kvitová was upset in the third round by former World No. 1 Jelena Janković. After Wimbledon, Kvitová announced that she had been diagnosed with mononucleosis. She then suffered consecutive opening-round losses in the hands of Victoria Azarenka in Toronto and Caroline Garcia in Cincinnati. However, she rebounded spectacularly by defending her title at New Haven and achieving her career-best result at Flushing Meadows by reaching the quarterfinals. She then lost in the third round of Wuhan to Roberta Vinci and the first round of Beijing to Sara Errani.

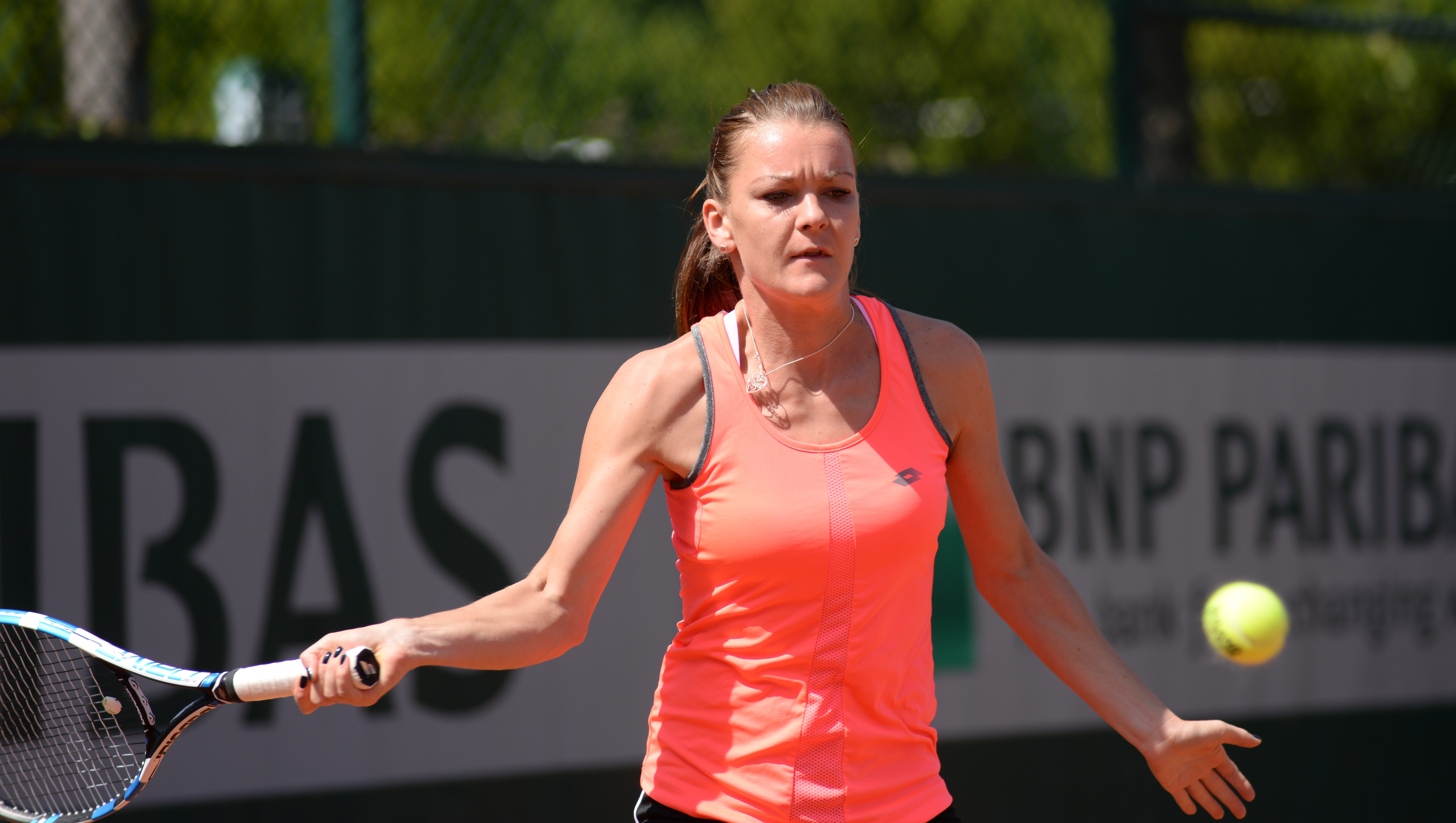
Agnieszka Radwańska reached the semifinals of Wimbledon.

On 18 October, Agnieszka Radwańska was confirmed as the sixth qualifier after capturing the Tianjin Open title.

Agnieszka Radwańska began 2015 by competing at the Hopman Cup, where she claimed the title for Poland with Jerzy Janowicz defeating Americans Serena Williams and John Isner. However, she was unable to carry the momentum from this victory, winning back-to-back matches only three times between Sydney and the French Open. She rebounded at Nottingham, reaching the semifinals, before reaching the final at Eastbourne where she lost to Belinda Bencic. She followed it up with a semifinal appearance at Wimbledon falling to Spain's Garbiñe Muguruza in three sets. Radwańska continued her better form with consistent results during the US Open series, reaching three quarterfinals out of four tournaments played. However, she lost in the third round of the US Open to Madison Keys. At the Pan Pacific Open, Radwańska claimed her first title in over a year against Bencic in straight sets. She then reached the semifinal of the China Open, once again losing to Muguruza. She claimed her second title of the year at the Tianjin Open defeating first time finalist Danka Kovinić. This is the fifth straight year Radwańska has qualified for the championships.

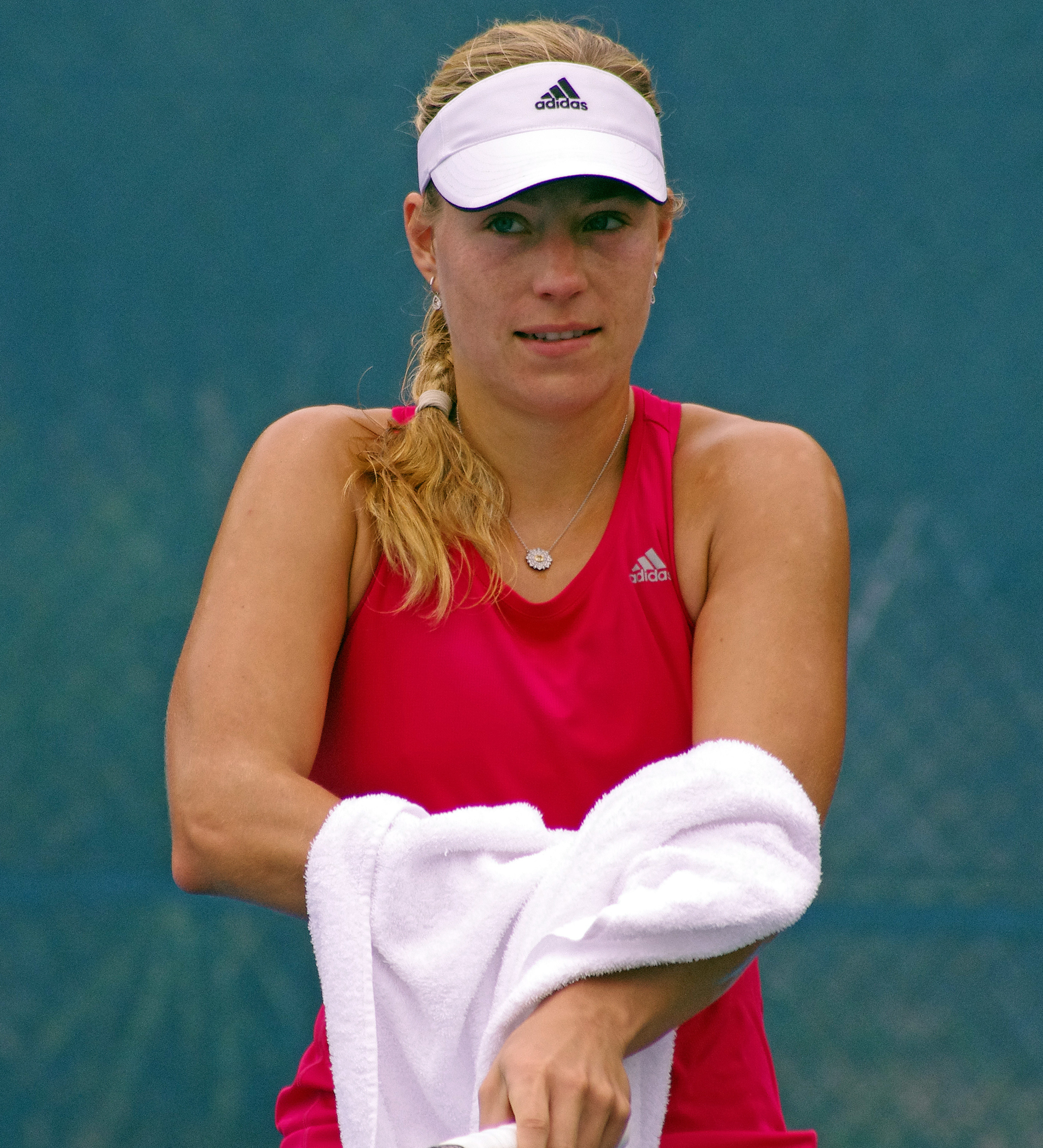
Angelique Kerber won four titles in 2015.

On 21 October, Angelique Kerber and Flavia Pennetta became the sixth and seventh qualifiers respectively.

Angelique Kerber started her season by reaching the quarterfinals at the Brisbane International, where she lost to Elina Svitolina. After reaching the semifinals in Sydney, Kerber lost 8 of her next 11 matches, including Australian Open in which she lost to Irina-Camelia Begu, the worst being a 6–1 6–1 loss to then-World No. 81 Francesca Schiavone in Antwerp which prompted Kerber to split with coach Benjamin Ebrahimzadeh and reunite with Torben Beltz. She then won the Family Circle Cup by beating home favorite Madison Keys in the final. Kerber continued her winning streak by winning the Porsche Tennis Grand Prix defeating Caroline Wozniacki in the final to win her second title in a row. She suffered her first career loss to Garbiñe Muguruza in an epic three sets in the third round of the French Open. Kerber rebounded by defeating Karolína Plíšková to win her third title of the year in Birmingham. She was then however defeated by eventual finalist Muguruza in the third round of Wimbledon. Kerber beat Plíšková to win her fourth title of the year at the Bank of the West Classic. Kerber again lost an epic third round match at the US Open, this time to Victoria Azarenka. She then reached the final of the Hong Kong Open where she succumbed to Jelena Janković in three sets. This will be Kerber's third appearance at the Championships.

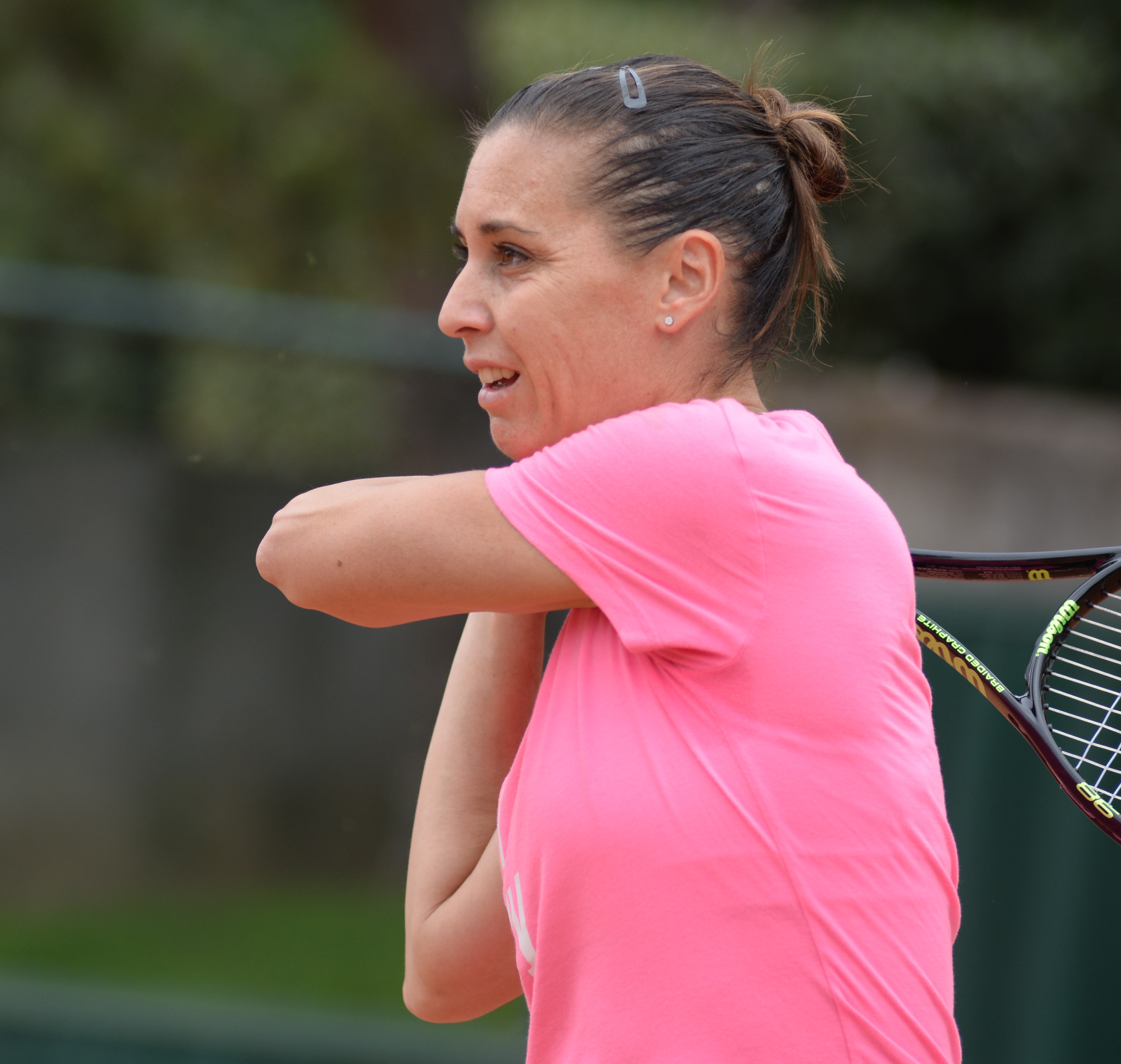
Flavia Pennetta won her maiden slam at the US Open.

Flavia Pennetta did not win a match until the Dubai Tennis Championships where she lost to Caroline Wozniacki in the last eight. As the defending champion at Indian Wells, she managed to reach the quarterfinals but lost to Sabine Lisicki. After defeating Victoria Azarenka in the third round at Miami, she lost to Simona Halep in the following round. At Marrakech, she lost to Tímea Babos in the quarterfinals. She then lost her opening matches at both Madrid and Rome. This was followed by a round of 16 appearance at the French Open where she lost to Garbiñe Muguruza. Pennetta succumbed to Zarina Diyas in three sets in the first round at Wimbledon. She then lost in the second rounds of Toronto and Cincinnati to Serena Williams and Belinda Bencic respectively. At the US Open, Pennetta captured her maiden Grand Slam singles title after a dream run to the final by defeating compatriot Roberta Vinci in the final. She then withdrew from the Wuhan and then reached the R16 of the China Open, losing to Anastasia Pavlyuchenkova. She qualified for the finals by winning her opening match at the Kremlin Cup but then withdrew from her quarter final match against Lesia Tsurenko. This is her first appearance at the Championships.

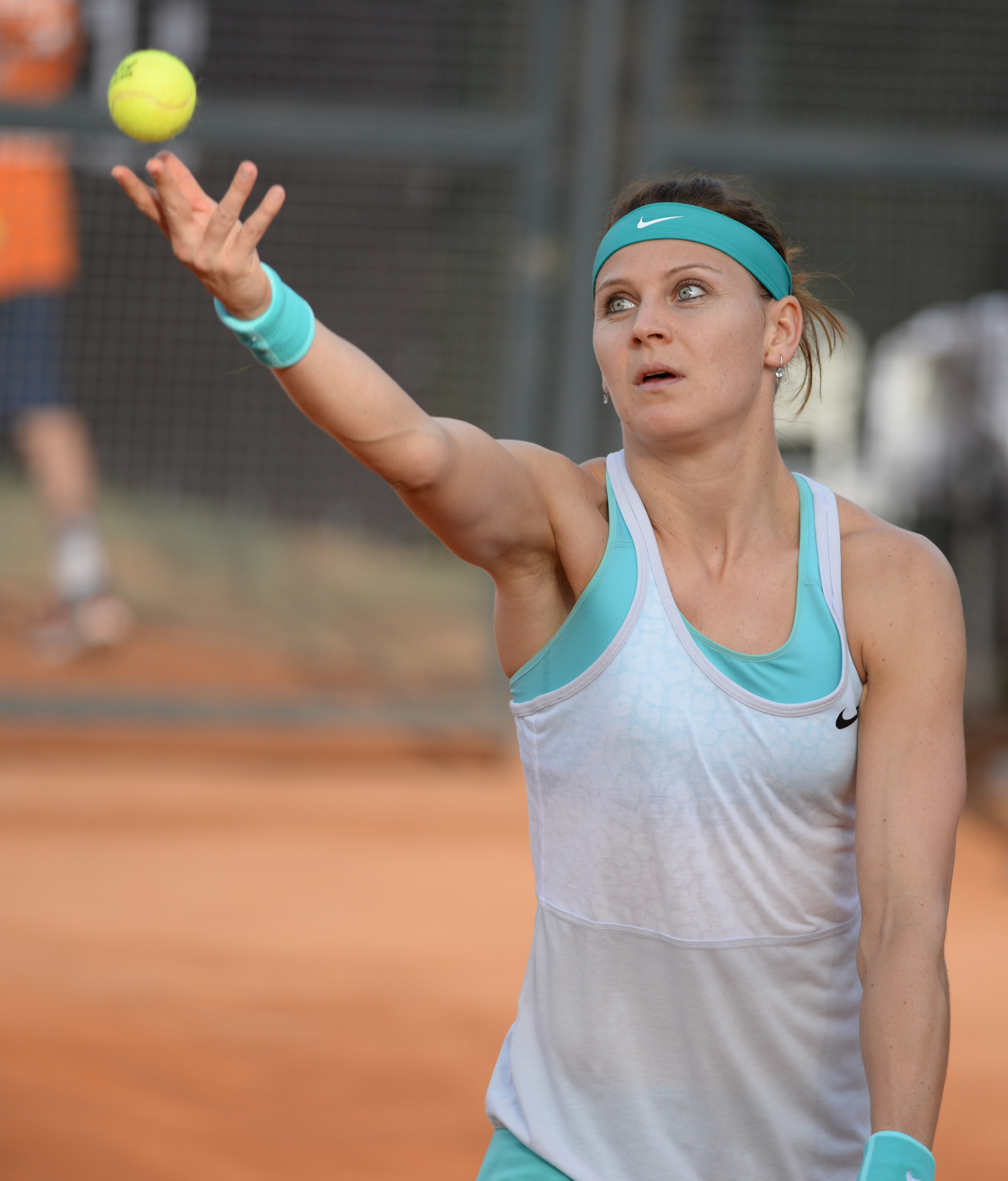
Lucie Šafářová reached her first slam final at the French Open.

On October 22, Lucie Šafářová was announced as the final qualifier for the Championships.

Lucie Šafářová began the season by dropping her opening round matches in Sydney and the Australian Open. She rebounded by winning her biggest career title to date at Doha by beating Victoria Azarenka in the final in straight sets. She then reached the quarterfinals at Madrid where she lost to Svetlana Kuznetsova. Šafářová then advanced to her first ever Grand Slam singles final at the French Open by defeating former champion Ana Ivanovic in the semifinals. There, she lost to Serena Williams in three sets. At Wimbledon, she cruised into the fourth round but was upset by Coco Vandeweghe in straight set. She then lost to Petra Kvitová in the final at New Haven. After suffering a first round loss at the US Open to Lesia Tsurenko, it was revealed that Šafářová was suffering from an abdominal muscle tear and a bacterial infection. She missed the Asian swing as a result and in her first match back in Linz, she lost to Andreea Mitu in straight sets. At the Kremlin Cup, she was defeated by Anastasia Pavlyuchenkova in her opening match. She will be making her debut at the Championships.

The first alternate of the tour finals is Venus Williams, who had a resurgent year in 2015.She began the year by winning the ASB Classic defeating Caroline Wozniacki in three sets. She then followed it up by reaching her first slam quarterfinal at the Australian Open since 2010 losing to Madison Keys. She also was able to reach the quarterfinals of the US Open losing to sister Serena. She won her biggest title since Dubai 2010, by claiming the Wuhan Open defeating Garbiñe Muguruza in the finals. The second alternate spot was taken by Carla Suárez Navarro had a break through in 2015, including breaking through the top 10 and reaching a career high of no. 8 in the world. She was able to reach three finals in the year, but losing in all of them. The first coming at the Diamond Games, where she needed to withdraw from the final against Andrea Petkovic with a neck injury. She followed it up with her biggest final to date at the Miami Open but lost to world no. 1 Serena Williams winning just two games. Her third final was at the Internazionali BNL d'Italia where she fell to Maria Sharapova in three sets. Despite strong showings at WTA events, Suárez Navarro struggled at the major events losing in the first round of three of the four slams.

=== Doubles ===
#	Players	Points	Tourn	Date Qualified
1	Martina Hingis (SUI); Sania Mirza (IND)	5,886	12	14 July
2	Bethanie Mattek-Sands (USA); Lucie Šafářová (CZE)	5,490	8	16 August
inj	Casey Dellacqua (AUS); Yaroslava Shvedova (KAZ)	4,721	7	15 September
inj	Ekaterina Makarova (RUS); Elena Vesnina (RUS)	4,586	10	15 September
3	Tímea Babos (HUN); Kristina Mladenovic (FRA)	4,235	17	5 October
4	Katarina Srebotnik (SLO); Caroline Garcia (FRA)	3,705	18	9 October
5	Chan Hao-ching (TPE); Chan Yung-jan (TPE)	3,705	13	10 October
6	Raquel Kops-Jones (USA); Abigail Spears (USA)	3,280	19	17 October
7	Andrea Hlaváčková (CZE); Lucie Hradecká (CZE)	3,130	17	20 October
8	Garbiñe Muguruza (ESP); Carla Suárez Navarro (ESP)	3,100	13	22 October

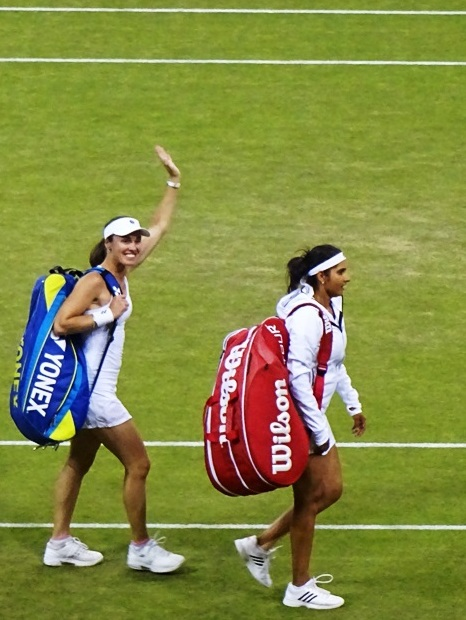
Martina Hingis and Sania Mirza won Wimbledon in 2015.

On 14 July, Martina Hingis and Sania Mirza became the first doubles players to qualify for the Championships.

Martina Hingis and Sania Mirza began their partnership at the BNP Paribas Open and winning the title against Makarova/Vesnina, they then claimed their next two events at the Miami Open once again over Makarova/Vesnina and the Family Circle Cup over Dellacqua/Jurak, claiming three titles in a row, this wins placed Mirza on the top of the rankings. They went on to reach the final of the Internazionali BNL d'Italia losing to Babos/Mladenovic. They then claimed their first slam as a team at Wimbledon once again defeating Makarova/Vesnina, for Mirza it was the first Grand Slam title and for Hingis the third Wimbledon and first Grand Slam title since 2002. They then claimed their second slam title at the US Open over Dellacqua/Shvedova. They then claimed three consecutive titles at the Guangzhou International Women's Open over Shilin/Xiaodi, at the Wuhan Open over Begu/Niculescu and at the China Open over Chan/Chan. Mirza also won another title with Bethanie Mattek-Sands at the Apia International Sydney over Kops-Jones/Spears, while Hingis won the Brisbane International with Sabine Lisicki over Garcia/Srebotnik. Mirza also reached the final of the Qatar Total Open with Hsieh Su-wei losing to Kops-Jones/Spears. At the Mixed Doubles, Hingis won three of the four slam pairing with Leander Paes, they won the Australian Open, Wimbledon and the US Open. For Hingis, it will be the sixth participation at the Championships since 2000, for Mirza, the second. Hingis won the Finals twice, while Mirza is the defending champion.

American Bethanie Mattek-Sands and Czech Lucie Šafářová on 16 August became the second duo to qualify.

Bethanie Mattek-Sands and Lucie Šafářová began their pairing by winning their first doubles slam as a team and as individual at the Australian Open defeating Chan/Zheng. They claimed their second title of the year at the Porsche Tennis Grand Prix over Garcia/Srebotnik. At the second slam of the year, the French Open, they claimed they second slam defeating Dellacqua/Shvedova. Their calendar year grand slam hope ended at Wimbledon when they lost to Kops-Jones/Spears in the quarterfinals. They claimed their fourth title at the Rogers Cup over Garcia/Srebotnik. The pair missed the US Open and the Asian swing due to Šafářova's infection. Mattek-Sands also claimed the Apia International Sydney with Mirza defeating Kops-Jones/Spears. In the Mixed Doubles, Mattek-Sands won the French Open with Mike Bryan and lost in the final of the US Open with Sam Querrey. Both players will debut at this year's Championships.

On September 15, the teams of Casey Dellacqua/Yaroslava Shvedova and Ekaterina Makarova/Elena Vesnina took the next two spots.

Casey Dellacqua and Yaroslava Shvedova started their partnership at the second quarter of the year. They claimed their lone title of the year at the Mutua Madrid Open defeating Muguruza/Suárez Navarro. They reached three other finals of the year but lost in each, at the French Open to Mattek-Sands/Šafářová, the Western & Southern Open to Chan/Chan and the US Open to Mirza/Hingis. Dellacqua also reached the final of the Family Circle Cup with Darija Jurak losing to Mirza/Hingis. This would be Dellacqua's first appearance at the event, while this is Shvedova's third appearance having reached the semifinals in her previous two appearances. The team withdrew due to Dellacqua's concussion.

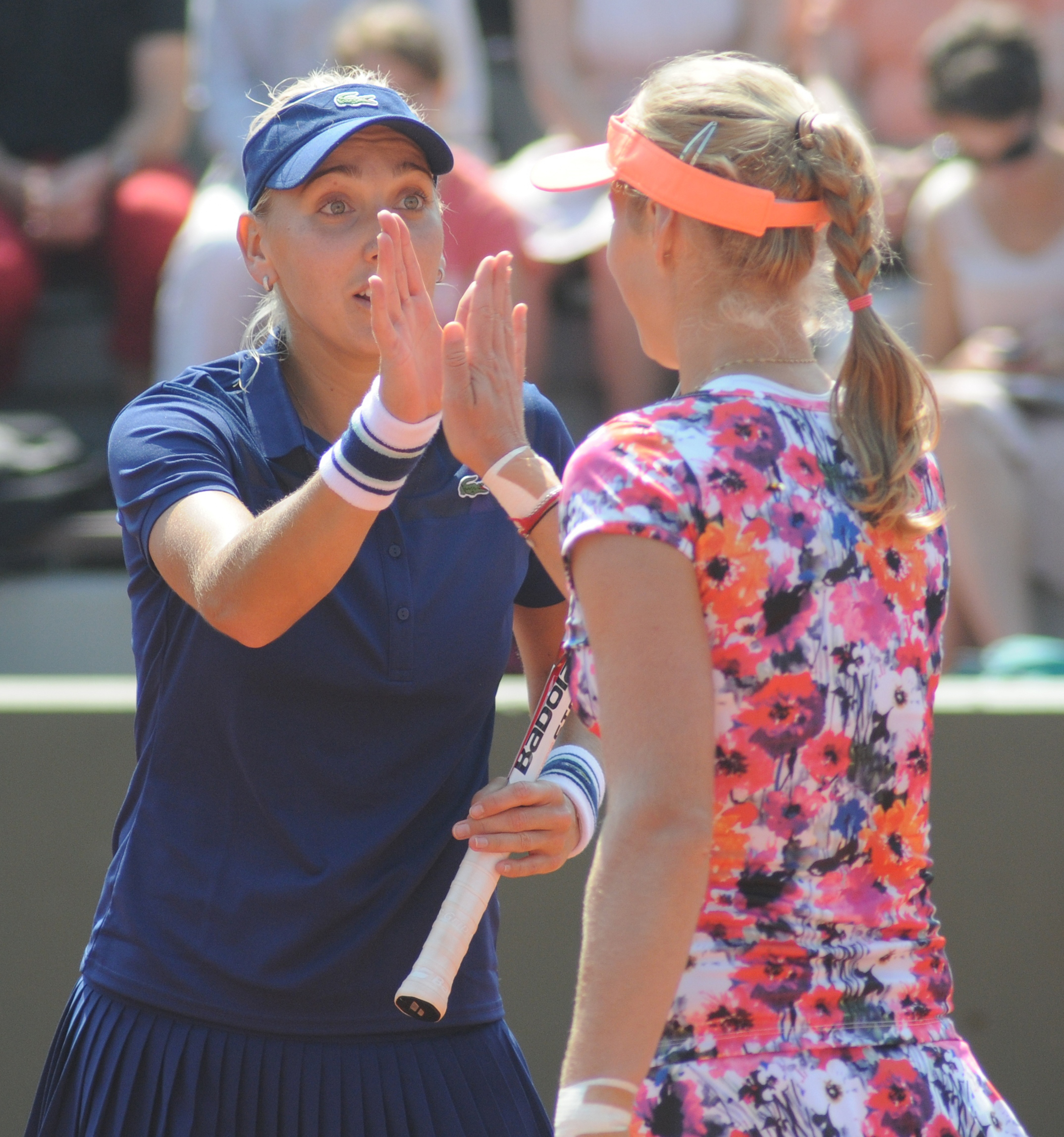
Makarova and Vesnina reached the final of Wimbledon in 2015.

Ekaterina Makarova and Elena Vesnina are continuing their partnership for the fourth straight year. The team failed to win a title in the year but reached the finals of BNP Paribas Open, Miami Open and Wimbledon to the number 1 team of Hingis/Mirza. This is the team's third Year-End Championship appearance having reached the final in 2013. The team withdraw due to Makarova's leg injury.

On October 5, the team of Tímea Babos and Kristina Mladenovic became the fifth team to qualify.

Tímea Babos and Kristina Mladenovic continued their partnership from 2014. The pair won their first title as a team at the Dubai Tennis Championships defeating Muguruza/Suárez Navarro. They also won the international event Marrakech Grand Prix over Siegemund/Zanevska. They won their third title and second Premier 5 event at the Internazionali BNL d'Italia defeating Hingis/Mirza. Mladenovic also won the Citi Open with Belinda Bencic over Arruabarrena/Klepač. The pair also reached the finals of Mixed Doubles slam but both losing with different partners Mladenovic with Daniel Nestor at the Australian Open and Babos with Alexander Peya at Wimbledon.

On October 9, Katarina Srebotnik and Caroline Garcia took the sixth spot.

Katarina Srebotnik and Caroline Garcia began their partnership at the beginning of 2015. They began their year by reaching the final of Brisbane International losing to Hingis/Lisicki. They reached their second final of the year at the Porsche Tennis Grand Prix losing to Mattek-Sands/Šafářová. At their third final, they claimed their first title as a team defeating Chan/Zheng at the Aegon International. They reached their first Premier 5 final as a team at the Rogers Cup falling to Mattek-Sands/Šafářová. On October 10, sisters Chan Hao-ching and Chan Yung-jan qualified after reaching the final of the China Open.

Chan Hao-ching and Chan Yung-jan mainly partnered with each for 2015. They claimed their first title of 2015 at the PTT Thailand Open defeating the team of Aoyama/Tanasugarn. They claimed their biggest title of the year at the Premier event of Western & Southern Open defeating Dellacqua/Shvedova. They also won the Japan Women's Open over the local pairing of Doi/Nara. They reached two other final, at the Toray Pan Pacific Open losing to Muguruza/Suárez Navarro and the final of the China Open losing to the number 1 pairing of Mirza/Hingis. Hao-ching also claimed a title with Anabel Medina Garrigues at the Nürnberger Versicherungscup defeating Arruabarrena/Olaru, while Yung-jan paired with Zheng Jie in a losing effort at the Australian Open to Mattek-Sands/Šafářová.

On October 18, Raquel Kops-Jones and Abigail Spears qualified after reaching the final of the Generali Ladies Linz.

Raquel Kops-Jones and Abigail Spears partnering for the ninth year entered the top 10 for the first time. They began their 2015 by reaching the final of Apia International Sydney losing to Mattek-Sands/Mirza. They claimed their first title of 2015 at the Qatar Total Open defeating Hsieh/Mirza. At the Aegon Nottingham Open they defeating the local team of Rae/Smith. They claimed their third title of the year at the Generali Ladies Linz defeating the Czech team of Hlaváčková/Hradecká.

On October 20, following Makarova and Vesnina's withdrawal, the Czech pairing of Andrea Hlaváčková and Lucie Hradecká took their spot.

Andrea Hlaváčková and Lucie Hradecká re-partnered after splitting in 2014. They were able to reach three finals in the year, the first coming at the Abierto Mexicano Telcel losing to Arruabarrena/Torró Flor, then at the Aegon Classic losing to Muguruza/Suárez Navarro, then finally the final of Generali Ladies Linz losing to Kops-Jones/Spears. Hradecká also reached the final of Gastein Ladies with Lara Arruabarrena losing to Kovinić/Vogt, she won her lone title at the Connecticut Open with Julia Görges defeating Chuang/Liang. Hradecká also reached the final of the Mixed Doubles of French Open with Marcin Matkowski losing in the final.

On October 22, following the withdrawal of Dellacqua and Shvedova, the Spanish duo of Garbiñe Muguruza and Carla Suárez Navarro qualified for the championships.

Garbiñe Muguruza and Carla Suárez Navarro continued their partnership from 2014. They reached the final of Dubai, losing to the pairing of Babos/Mladenovic. They reached the final of the Mutua Madrid Open, losing to the newly paired Dellacqua/Shvedova. They won their 1st title in 2015 when they beat the Czech team of Hlaváčková/Hradecká at the Aegon Classic. They won their second title at the Toray Pan Pacific Open defeating Chan/Chan.

== Groupings ==
=== Singles ===
The 2015 edition of the year–end finals will feature only one former world no. 1, three Grand Slam champions and four Grand Slam finalists. The competitors were divided into two groups, representing the colors of the flag of Singapore.

Red group:
Simona Halep, Maria Sharapova, Agnieszka Radwańska & Flavia Pennetta
White group:
Garbiñe Muguruza, Petra Kvitová, Angelique Kerber & Lucie Šafářová

In the red group, each player's respective records are; no. 1 seed Simona Halep is 5–13, no. 3 Maria Sharapova is 19–5, no. 5 seed Agnieszka Radwańska is 11–19, and no. 7 seed Flavia Pennetta is 10–8. Despite being the top seed, Halep has quite a poor record against her group. She is 0–5 against Sharapova, including their last meeting at the 2014 Western & Southern Open. Against Radwańska, Halep is tied at 4–4, but she has won 4 of the last 5 matches between the pair, including most recently at the 2015 Rogers Cup. In her match-up with Pennetta, Halep trails 1–4, losing the last time they met at the 2015 US Open. Sharapova has a strong record against Radwańska, standing at 12–2, winning the last 5 meetings, most recently in first round of the 2015 Fed Cup. Against Pennetta, Sharapova trails 2–3, the only head-to-head she is on the losing side of. Pennetta won the last time they faced each other, at the 2015 BNP Paribas Open. In the final match up, Radwańska leads Pennetta 5–3, including victory over the Italian in their most recent encounter, at the 2015 Qatar Total Open.

In the white group, each player's respective records are; no. 2 seed Garbiñe Muguruza is 3–4, no. 4 seed Petra Kvitová is 11–2, no. 6 seed Angelique Kerber is 6–8, and no. 8 seed Lucie Šafářová is 2–8. Muguruza and Kvitová will be facing each other for the first time. Muguruza and Kerber have split their meetings 3–3, however the Spaniard has won the last 3 matches, most recently at the 2015 Wuhan Open. Muguruza is 0–1 against Šafářová, losing the only time they have played one another at the 2015 French Open. Kvitová has an impeccable record against the rest of her group, which includes 4–2 lead over Kerber. The Czech also won the last time they played, in the final of the 2014 Fed Cup. She has a perfect head-to-head with compatriot Šafářová, leading 7–0. Kvitová won their most recent encounter at the 2015 Connecticut Open. Lastly, Kerber and Šafářová are tied at 1–1, the latter winning when they last met in the final of the 2014 Fed Cup.

=== Doubles ===
Red group:
Martina Hingis/Sania Mirza, Tímea Babos/Kristina Mladenovic, Raquel Kops-Jones/Abigail Spears & Andrea Hlaváčková/Lucie Hradecká
White group:
Bethanie Mattek-Sands/Lucie Šafářová, Chan Hao-ching/Chan Yung-jan, Caroline Garcia/Katarina Srebotnik & Garbiñe Muguruza/Carla Suárez Navarro

== Player head-to-head ==
Below are the head-to-head records as they approached the tournament.

2015 WTA Finals – Singles

		Halep	Muguruza	Sharapova	Kvitová	Radwańska	Kerber	Pennetta	Šafářová	Overall	YTD
1	(Romania) Simona Halep		1–2	0–5	2–0	4–4	3–0	1–4	3–1	14–16	48–15
2	(Spain) Garbiñe Muguruza	2–1		0–3	0–0	4–2	3–3	3–0	0–1	12–10	38–18
3	(Russia) Maria Sharapova	5–0	3–0		6–3	12–2	4–3	2–3	4–2	36–13	34–8
4	(Czech Republic) Petra Kvitová	0–2	0–0	3–6		6–2	4–2	3–4	7–0	23–16	35–13
5	(Poland) Agnieszka Radwańska	4–4	2–4	2–12	2–6		6–5	5–3	1–4	22–38	48–23
6	(Germany) Angelique Kerber	0–3	3–3	3–4	2–4	5–6		2–4	1–1	16–25	48–19
7	(Italy) Flavia Pennetta	4–1	0–3	3–2	4–3	3–5	4–2		1–4	19–20	27–16
8	(Czech Republic) Lucie Šafářová	1–3	1–0	2–4	0–7	4–1	1–1	4–1		13–17	31–18

2015 WTA Finals – Doubles

		Hingis; Mirza	Mattek-Sands; Šafářová	Babos; Mladenovic	Garcia; Srebotnik	Chan; Chan	Kops-Jones; Spears	Hlaváčková; Hradecká	Muguruza; Suárez Navarro	Overall	YTD
1	(Switzerland) Martina Hingis (India) Sania Mirza		0–2	1–1	1–2	4–1	2–0	0–0	0–0	8–6	50–7
2	(United States) Bethanie Mattek-Sands (Czech Republic) Lucie Šafářová	2–0		1–0	3–0	0–0	0–1	1–0	0–0	7–1	28–4
3	(Hungary) Tímea Babos (France) Kristina Mladenovic	1–1	0–1		2–0	0–0	0–2	0–0	1–1	4–5	31–14
4	(France) Caroline Garcia (Slovenia) Katarina Srebotnik	2–1	0–3	0–2		0–1	0–0	0–0	0–0	2–7	31–17
5	(Chinese Taipei) Chan Hao-ching (Chinese Taipei) Chan Yung-jan	1–4	0–0	0–0	1–0		1–2	1–0	0–1	4–7	28–9
6	(United States) Raquel Kops-Jones (United States) Abigail Spears	0–2	1–0	2–0	0–0	2–1		0–1	0–0	5–4	30–16
7	(Czech Republic) Andrea Hlaváčková (Czech Republic) Lucie Hradecká	0–0	0–1	0–0	0–0	0–1	1–1		0–1	1–4	32–17
8	(Spain) Garbiñe Muguruza (Spain) Carla Suárez Navarro	0–0	0–0	1–1	0–0	1–0	0–0	1–0		3–1	23–11

== Day-by-day summaries ==
=== Day 1 (22 October) ===
Matches
Event	Winner	Loser	Score
Rising Stars round robin	(China) Zhu Lin [2]	(Tunisia) Ons Jabeur [3]	4–1, 4–2
Rising Stars round robin	(France) Caroline Garcia [1]	(Japan) Naomi Osaka [4]	4–1, 1–4, 4–1

=== Day 2 (23 October) ===
Matches
Event	Winner	Loser	Score
Rising Stars round robin	(Tunisia) Ons Jabeur [3]	(Japan) Naomi Osaka [4]	2–4, 5–4^{(7–0)}, 4–1
Rising Stars round robin	(France) Caroline Garcia [1]	(China) Zhu Lin [2]	5–3, 5–4^{(7–2)}

=== Day 3 (24 October) ===
Matches
Event	Winner	Loser	Score
Rising Stars round robin	(Japan) Naomi Osaka [4]	(China) Zhu Lin [2]	4–2, 2–4, 5–4^{(7–4)}
Rising Stars round robin	(France) Caroline Garcia [1]	(Tunisia) Ons Jabeur [3]	4–0, 4–5^{(6–8)}, 4–2

=== Day 4 (25 October) ===
Matches
Event	Group	Winner	Loser	Score
Doubles round robin	White Group	(United States) Bethanie Mattek-Sands (Czech Republic) Lucie Šafářová [2]	(Spain) Garbiñe Muguruza (Spain) Carla Suárez Navarro [8]	6–3, 7–6^{(7–1)}
Rising Stars Final	N/A	(Japan) Naomi Osaka [4]	(France) Caroline Garcia [1]	3–5, 5–4^{(8–6)}, 4–1
Singles round robin	Red Group	(Romania) Simona Halep [1]	(Italy) Flavia Pennetta [7]	6–0, 6–3
Singles round robin	Red Group	(Russia) Maria Sharapova [3]	(Poland) Agnieszka Radwańska [5]	4–6, 6–3, 6–4
Doubles round robin	Red Group	(Czech Republic) Andrea Hlaváčková (Czech Republic) Lucie Hradecká [7]	(Hungary) Tímea Babos (France) Kristina Mladenovic [4]	6–2, 6–1

=== Day 5 (26 October) ===
Matches
Event	Group	Winner	Loser	Score
Doubles round robin	White Group	(Chinese Taipei) Chan Hao-ching (Chinese Taipei) Chan Yung-jan [3]	(France) Caroline Garcia (Slovenia) Katarina Srebotnik [5]	6–4, 7–6^{(7–5)}
Singles round robin	White Group	(Spain) Garbiñe Muguruza [2]	(Czech Republic) Lucie Šafářová [8]	6–3, 7–6^{(7–4)}
Singles round robin	White Group	(Germany) Angelique Kerber [6]	(Czech Republic) Petra Kvitová [4]	6–2, 7–6^{(7–3)}
Doubles round robin	Red Group	(Switzerland) Martina Hingis (India) Sania Mirza [1]	(United States) Raquel Kops-Jones (United States) Abigail Spears [6]	6–4, 6–2

=== Day 6 (27 October) ===
Matches
Event	Group	Winner	Loser	Score
Doubles round robin	White Group	(Chinese Taipei) Chan Hao-ching (Chinese Taipei) Chan Yung-jan [3]	(United States) Bethanie Mattek-Sands (Czech Republic) Lucie Šafářová [2]	6–2, 6–2
Singles round robin	Red Group	(Italy) Flavia Pennetta [7]	(Poland) Agnieszka Radwańska [5]	7–6^{(7–5)}, 6–4
Legends Classic	N/A	(United States) Tracy Austin (Spain) Arantxa Sánchez Vicario	(France) Marion Bartoli (United States) Martina Navratilova	8–5
Singles round robin	Red Group	(Russia) Maria Sharapova [3]	(Romania) Simona Halep [1]	6–4, 6–4
Doubles round robin	White Group	(Spain) Garbiñe Muguruza (Spain) Carla Suárez Navarro [8]	(France) Caroline Garcia (Slovenia) Katarina Srebotnik [5]	7–5, 6–2

=== Day 7 (28 October) ===
Matches
Event	Group	Winner	Loser	Score
Doubles round robin	Red Group	(Hungary) Tímea Babos (France) Kristina Mladenovic [4]	(United States) Raquel Kops-Jones (United States) Abigail Spears [6]	7–6^{(7–5)}, 6–2
Singles round robin	White Group	(Czech Republic) Petra Kvitová [4]	(Czech Republic) Lucie Šafářová [8]	7–5, 7–5
Legends Classic	N/A	(United States) Martina Navratilova (Spain) Arantxa Sánchez Vicario	(United States) Tracy Austin (France) Marion Bartoli	4–2, 4–0, 4–0
Singles round robin	White Group	(Spain) Garbiñe Muguruza [2]	(Germany) Angelique Kerber [6]	6–4, 6–4
Doubles round robin	Red Group	(Switzerland) Martina Hingis (India) Sania Mirza [1]	(Czech Republic) Andrea Hlaváčková (Czech Republic) Lucie Hradecká [7]	6–3, 6–4

=== Day 8 (29 October) ===
Matches
Event	Group	Winner	Loser	Score
Doubles round robin	White Group	(Spain) Garbiñe Muguruza (Spain) Carla Suárez Navarro [8]	(Chinese Taipei) Chan Hao-ching (Chinese Taipei) Chan Yung-jan [3]	7–5, 6–4
Singles round robin	Red Group	(Poland) Agnieszka Radwańska [5]	(Romania) Simona Halep [1]	7–6^{(7–5)}, 6–1
Legends Classic	N/A	(United States) Tracy Austin (United States) Martina Navratilova	(France) Marion Bartoli (Spain) Arantxa Sánchez Vicario	4–2, 4–1
Singles round robin	Red Group	(Russia) Maria Sharapova [3]	(Italy) Flavia Pennetta [7]	7–5, 6–1
Doubles round robin	White Group	(France) Caroline Garcia (Slovenia) Katarina Srebotnik [5]	(United States) Bethanie Mattek-Sands (Czech Republic) Lucie Šafářová [2]	6–2, 3–0 Retired

=== Day 9 (30 October) ===
Matches
Event	Group	Winner	Loser	Score
Doubles round robin	Red Group	(Switzerland) Martina Hingis (India) Sania Mirza [1]	(Hungary) Tímea Babos (France) Kristina Mladenovic [4]	6–4, 7–5
Singles round robin	White Group	(Spain) Garbiñe Muguruza [2]	(Czech Republic) Petra Kvitová [4]	6–4, 4–6, 7–5
Singles round robin	White Group	(Czech Republic) Lucie Šafářová [8]	(Germany) Angelique Kerber [6]	6–4, 6–3
Doubles round robin	Red Group	(United States) Raquel Kops-Jones (United States) Abigail Spears [6]	(Czech Republic) Andrea Hlaváčková (Czech Republic) Lucie Hradecká [7]	6–3, 3–6, [11–9]

=== Day 10 (31 October) ===
Matches
Event	Winner	Loser	Score
Doubles Semifinals	(Switzerland) Martina Hingis (India) Sania Mirza [1]	(Chinese Taipei) Chan Hao-ching (Chinese Taipei) Chan Yung-jan [3]	6–4, 6–2
Singles Semifinals	(Poland) Agnieszka Radwańska [5]	(Spain) Garbiñe Muguruza [2]	6–7^{(5–7)}, 6–3, 7–5
Singles Semifinals	(Czech Republic) Petra Kvitová [4]	(Russia) Maria Sharapova [3]	6–3, 7–6^{(7–3)}
Doubles Semifinals	(Spain) Garbiñe Muguruza (Spain) Carla Suárez Navarro [8]	(Czech Republic) Andrea Hlaváčková (Czech Republic) Lucie Hradecká [7]	7–6^{(8–6)}, 6–0

=== Day 11 (1 November) ===
Matches
Event	Winner	Loser	Score
Doubles Championship	(Switzerland) Martina Hingis (India) Sania Mirza [1]	(Spain) Garbiñe Muguruza (Spain) Carla Suárez Navarro [8]	6–0, 6–3
Singles Championship	(Poland) Agnieszka Radwańska [5]	(Czech Republic) Petra Kvitová [4]	6–2, 4–6, 6–3

== Points breakdown ==
=== Singles ===
Players with a gold rank cell are officially qualified for WTA Finals in Singapore.
First 8 players qualify for Singapore (except those with brown rank cell, who are not participating).
The two players after them will be alternates in Singapore.

Rank	Athlete	Grand Slam tournament				Premier Mandatory				Best Premier 5		Best other						Total points	Tourn	Titles
Rank	Athlete	AUS	FRA	WIM	USO	INW	MIA	MAD	BEI	1	2	1	2	3	4	5	6	Total points	Tourn	Titles
Qualified for WTA Finals
1	(United States) Serena Williams	W 2000	W 2000	W 2000	SF; 780	SF; 390	W 1000	SF; 390	A 0	W 900	SF; 350	R16; 105	R16; 30					9945	14	5
2	(Romania) Simona Halep	QF; 430	R64; 70	R128; 10	SF; 780	W 1000	SF; 390	R64; 10	R64; 10	W 900	F 585	F 585	SF; 350	W 280	SF; 185	R16; 105	QF; 100	5790	17	3
3	(Spain) Garbiñe Muguruza	R16; 240	QF; 430	F 1300	R64; 70	R32; 65	R32; 65	R32; 65	W 1000	F 585	SF; 350	QF; 100	QF; 100	R16; 55	R16; 55	R16; 30	R32; 1	4511	19	1
4	(Russia) Maria Sharapova	F 1300	R16; 240	SF; 780	A 0	R16; 120	R64; 10	SF; 390	A 0	W 900	R32; 1	W 470	SF; 110	R16; 1				4322	16	2
5	(Czech Republic) Petra Kvitová	R32; 130	R16; 240	R32; 130	QF; 430	R32; 1^{†}	R32; 1^{†}	W 1000	R64; 10	QF; 190	R16; 105	W 470	W 470	SF; 110	R16; 105	QF; 100	R32; 1	3491	18	3
6	(Poland) Agnieszka Radwańska	R16; 240	R128; 10	SF; 780	R32; 130	R32; 65	R16; 120	R16; 120	SF; 390	QF; 190	R16; 105	W 470	F 305	W 280	SF; 110	SF; 110		3425	23	2
7	(Germany) Angelique Kerber	R128; 10	R32; 130	R32; 130	R32; 130	R64; 10	R32; 65	R64; 10	QF; 215	SF; 350	R16; 105	W 470	W 470	W 470	W 470	SF; 185	F 180	3400	24	4
8	(Italy) Flavia Pennetta	R128; 10	R16; 240	R128; 10	W 2000	QF; 215	R16; 120	R64; 10	R16; 120	QF; 190	R32; 60	QF; 100	R32; 60	QF; 60	R16; 55	R64; 1	R32; 1	3252	19	1
9	(Czech Republic) Lucie Šafářová	R128; 10	F 1300	R16; 240	R128; 10	R32; 65	R64; 10	QF; 215	R32; 1^{†}	QF; 190	QF; 190	W 470	F 305	QF; 100	R32; 60	R16; 55	R32; 1	3221	21	1
WTA Finals Alternate
10	(Switzerland) Timea Bacsinszky	R32; 130	SF; 780	QF; 430	R128; 10	QF; 215	A 0	R64; 10	F 650	R16; 105	R64; 1	W 280	W 280	F 180	QF; 60	R64; 1	R32; 1	3133	16	2
11	(United States) Venus Williams	QF; 430	R128; 10	R16; 240	QF; 430	A 0	QF; 215	R64; 10	R32; 10	W 900	R16; 105	W 280	SF; 185	SF; 110	R16; 105	R32; 60	R64; 1	3091	17	2
12	(Spain) Carla Suárez Navarro	R128; 10	R32; 130	R128; 10	R128; 10	QF; 215	F 650	QF; 215	R16; 120	F 585	QF; 190	F 305	SF; 185	R16; 105	QF; 100	QF; 100	QF; 100	3030	24	0

† The player's ranking at the time did not qualify her to play this event. Accordingly, the player's next best result is counted in its place.

=== Doubles ===
The 8 pairs with a gold rank number have qualified for WTA Finals in Singapore.
Those with brown rank cell have announced not to participate.

Rank	Athlete	Points											Total points	Tourn	Titles
Rank	Athlete	1	2	3	4	5	6	7	8	9	10	11	Total points	Tourn	Titles
Qualified for WTA Finals
1	Martina Hingis (SUI); Sania Mirza (IND)	W 2000	W 2000	W 1000	W 1000	W 1000	W 900	F 585	W 470	QF; 430	SF; 350	SF; 350	10,085	15	8
2	Bethanie Mattek-Sands (USA); Lucie Šafářová (CZE)	W 2000	W 2000	W 900	W 470	QF; 430	SF; 390	QF; 190	R32; 10				6,390	8	4
3	Casey Dellacqua (AUS); Yaroslava Shvedova (KAZ)	F 1300	F 1300	W 1000	F 585	QF; 430	SF; 390	R16; 105	R32; 1				5,111	8	1
4	Ekaterina Makarova (RUS); Elena Vesnina (RUS)	F 1300	SF; 780	F 650	F 650	QF; 430	QF; 215	QF; 190	SF; 185	SF; 185	R32; 1		4,586	10	0
5	Tímea Babos (HUN); Kristina Mladenovic (FRA)	W 900	W 900	SF; 780	SF; 390	W 280	R16; 240	QF; 215	QF; 190	SF; 185	R32; 130	R32; 130	4,340	18	3
6	Caroline Garcia (FRA); Katarina Srebotnik (SLO)	F 585	W 470	QF; 430	SF; 350	SF; 350	F 305	F 305	R16; 240	R16; 240	QF; 215	QF; 215	3,705	18	1
7	Chan Hao-ching (TPE); Chan Yung-jan (TPE)	W 900	F 650	QF; 430	SF; 350	F 305	W 280	W 280	QF; 190	W 160	QF; 100	QF; 60	3,705	13	4
8	Raquel Kops-Jones (USA); Abigail Spears (USA)	SF; 780	W 470	QF; 430	F 305	W 280	W 280	R16; 240	QF; 190	SF; 185	R16; 120	QF; 100	3,380	19	3
9	Andrea Hlaváčková (CZE); Lucie Hradecká (CZE)	SF; 780	SF; 390	SF; 350	F 305	R16; 240	QF; 215	F 180	F 180	R32; 130	R32; 130	R16; 120	3,130	17	0
10	Carla Suárez Navarro (ESP); Garbiñe Muguruza (ESP)	F 650	F 585	W 470	W 470	QF; 190	R32; 130	R32; 130	R32; 130	R16; 120	R16; 120	R16; 105	3,100	13	2
WTA Finals Alternate
11	Alla Kudryavtseva (RUS); Anastasia Pavlyuchenkova (RUS)	QF; 430	SF; 350	SF; 350	R16; 240	R16; 240	SF; 185	R32; 130	R16; 120	R16; 120	R16; 120	R16; 120	2,405	14	0

== See also ==
- 2015 WTA Elite Trophy
- 2015 ATP World Tour Finals
- 2015 Southeast Asian haze
