= Legends Classic =

Legends Classic may refer to:

- NBA All-Star Legends Game, an NBA game from 1984 to 1993 that featured retired legendary players
- Legends Classic (basketball tournament), an NCAA basketball tournament in November of each year since 2007
- 2015 WTA Finals – Legends Classic, a women's tennis exhibition event in Singapore
