= 2015 WTA Finals – Legends Classic =

Legends Classic
- 2015 WTA Finals

Final
- Champion: (United States) Martina Navratilova
- Runner-up: (Spain) Arantxa Sanchez-Vicario

Events
Singles	Doubles
← 2014 ·	WTA Finals	· 2016 →

The 2015 WTA Legends Classic was a women's tennis exhibition event held during the 2015 WTA Finals in Singapore at the Singapore Indoor Stadium.

Martina Navratilova won the tournament in an innovative doubles format that saw her earn the highest game-winning percentage after three doubles matches played.

== Results ==
1. (United States) Martina Navratilova (2–1, 23–15)
2. (Spain) Arantxa Sánchez Vicario (2–1, 21–17)
3. (United States) Tracy Austin (2–1, 20–18)
4. (France) Marion Bartoli (0–3, 12–26)

== Matches ==
Day	Winners	Losers	Score	Ref
Day 1 (27 October)	(United States) Tracy Austin / (Spain) Arantxa Sanchez-Vicario	(France) Marion Bartoli / (United States) Martina Navratilova	8–5	
Day 2 (28 October)	(United States) Martina Navratilova / (Spain) Arantxa Sanchez-Vicario	(United States) Tracy Austin / (France) Marion Bartoli	2–4, 4–0, 4–0	
Day 3 (29 October)	(United States) Tracy Austin / (United States) Martina Navratilova	(France) Marion Bartoli / (Spain) Arantxa Sanchez-Vicario	4–2, 4–1	
