= 2015 Brisbane International – Women's doubles =

Coordinates: 27°31′30″S 153°0′26″E

Women's doubles
- 2015 Brisbane International

Final
- Champions: (Switzerland) Martina Hingis (Germany) Sabine Lisicki
- Runners-up: (France) Caroline Garcia (Slovenia) Katarina Srebotnik
- Score: 6–2, 7–5

Details
- Draw: 16
- Seeds: 4

Events
Singles	men	women
Doubles	men	women
- Brisbane International

Alla Kudryavtseva and Anastasia Rodionova were the defending champions, but they chose not to participate together this year. Kudryavtseva played with Alexandra Panova, but lost in the quarterfinals to Martina Hingis and Sabine Lisicki. Rodionova played with Arina Rodionova, but lost in the quarterfinals to Hsieh Su-wei and Sania Mirza.
The unseeded team of Hingis and Lisicki won the title, defeating Caroline Garcia and Katarina Srebotnik in the final, 6–2, 7–5.

== Seeds ==
1. (Chinese Taipei) Hsieh Su-wei / (India) Sania Mirza (semifinals)
2. (United States) Raquel Kops-Jones / (United States) Abigail Spears (first round)
3. (Chinese Taipei) Chan Hao-ching / (Czech Republic) Květa Peschke (first round)
4. (France) Caroline Garcia / (Slovenia) Katarina Srebotnik (final)

== Draw ==
Key

- Q = Qualifier
- WC = Wild card
- LL = Lucky loser
- Alt = Alternate
- ITF = ITF entry
- PR = Protected ranking
- SR = Special ranking
- SE = Special exempt
- JE = Junior exempt
- JR = Junior Accelerator Programme entrant
- CO = College Accelerator Programme entrant
- NG = Next Gen Accelerator Program entrant
- w/o = Walkover
- r = Retired
- d = Defaulted

=== Draw ===
First round
1	(Chinese Taipei) S-w Hsieh (India) S Mirza	7	6
(Australia) J Gajdošová (Croatia) A Tomljanović	5	3
(Australia) An Rodionova (Australia) Ar Rodionova	7^{7}	6
WC	(Croatia) M Lučić-Baroni (United States) L Raymond	6^{3}	3
4	(France) C Garcia (Slovenia) K Srebotnik	6	3	[10]
(Germany) A Petkovic (Slovakia) M Rybáriková	2	6	[8]
(Poland) K Jans-Ignacik (Slovenia) A Klepač	4	1
WC	(Serbia) A Ivanovic (Germany) A Kerber	6	6
(Serbia) J Janković (Spain) A Parra Santonja	7	6
(Romania) R Olaru (China) S Zhang	5	2
(Netherlands) M Krajicek (Czech Republic) Ka Plíšková	7	6
3	(Chinese Taipei) H-c Chan (Czech Republic) K Peschke	5	4
(Switzerland) M Hingis (Germany) S Lisicki	6	6
WC	(Russia) D Gavrilova (Australia) S Sanders	2	2
(Russia) A Kudryavtseva (Russia) A Panova	6	4	[10]
2	(United States) R Kops-Jones (United States) A Spears	2	6	[3]

Quarterfinals
1	(Chinese Taipei) S-w Hsieh (India) S Mirza	6	2	[11]
(Australia) An Rodionova (Australia) Ar Rodionova	3	6	[9]
4	(France) C Garcia (Slovenia) K Srebotnik	w/o
WC	(Serbia) A Ivanovic (Germany) A Kerber
(Serbia) J Janković (Spain) A Parra Santonja	2	2
(Netherlands) M Krajicek (Czech Republic) Ka Plíšková	6	6
(Switzerland) M Hingis (Germany) S Lisicki	6	6
(Russia) A Kudryavtseva (Russia) A Panova	3	3

Semifinals
1	(Chinese Taipei) S-w Hsieh (India) S Mirza	6	6^{1}	[8]
4	(France) C Garcia (Slovenia) K Srebotnik	4	7^{7}	[10]
(Netherlands) M Krajicek (Czech Republic) Ka Plíšková	6^{3}	3
(Switzerland) M Hingis (Germany) S Lisicki	7^{7}	6

Final
4	(France) C Garcia (Slovenia) K Srebotnik	2	5
(Switzerland) M Hingis (Germany) S Lisicki	6	7
