= 2015 Porsche Tennis Grand Prix – Doubles =

Doubles
- 2015 Porsche Tennis Grand Prix

Final
- Champions: (United States) Bethanie Mattek-Sands (Czech Republic) Lucie Šafářová
- Runners-up: (France) Caroline Garcia (Slovenia) Katarina Srebotnik
- Score: 6–4, 6–3

Details
- Draw: 16
- Seeds: 4

Events
Singles	Doubles
- Porsche Tennis Grand Prix

Sara Errani and Roberta Vinci were the defending champions, but chose not to participate this year.
Bethanie Mattek-Sands and Lucie Šafářová won the title, defeating Caroline Garcia and Katarina Srebotnik in the final, 6–4, 6–3.

== Seeds ==
1. (Switzerland) Martina Hingis / (India) Sania Mirza (first round)
2. (France) Caroline Garcia / (Slovenia) Katarina Srebotnik (final)
3. (United States) Bethanie Mattek-Sands / (Czech Republic) Lucie Šafářová (champions)
4. (Poland) Klaudia Jans-Ignacik / (Slovenia) Andreja Klepač (quarterfinals)

== Draw ==
Key

- Q = Qualifier
- WC = Wild card
- LL = Lucky loser
- Alt = Alternate
- ITF = ITF entry
- PR = Protected ranking
- SR = Special ranking
- SE = Special exempt
- JE = Junior exempt
- JR = Junior Accelerator Programme entrant
- CO = College Accelerator Programme entrant
- NG = Next Gen Accelerator Program entrant
- w/o = Walkover
- r = Retired
- d = Defaulted

=== Draw ===
First round
1	(Switzerland) M Hingis (India) S Mirza	3	3
(Croatia) P Martić (Liechtenstein) S Vogt	6	6
(Croatia) D Jurak (Czech Republic) B Krejčíková	3	6	[5]
(Germany) J Görges (Germany) S Lisicki	6	3	[10]
3	(United States) B Mattek-Sands (Czech Republic) L Šafářová	6	6
(United Kingdom) J Rae (United Kingdom) A Smith	2	1
(Slovakia) J Husárová (Poland) P Kania	6	6
(Germany) M Barthel (Luxembourg) M Minella	2	1
(Czech Republic) E Hrdinová (United States) N Melichar	2	2
(Spain) A Parra Santonja (Poland) A Rosolska	6	6
(Georgia (country)) O Kalashnikova (Czech Republic) K Siniaková	4	0
4	(Poland) K Jans-Ignacik (Slovenia) A Klepač	6	6
(Chinese Taipei) C-w Chan (China) C Liang	6	5	[10]
WC	(Switzerland) B Bencic (Romania) S Halep	1	7	[8]
WC	(Germany) A Lottner (Germany) C Witthöft	3	3
2	(France) C Garcia (Slovenia) K Srebotnik	6	6

Quarterfinals
(Croatia) P Martić (Liechtenstein) S Vogt	6	3	[11]
(Germany) J Görges (Germany) S Lisicki	3	6	[9]
3	(United States) B Mattek-Sands (Czech Republic) L Šafářová	6	6
(Slovakia) J Husárová (Poland) P Kania	1	3
(Spain) A Parra Santonja (Poland) A Rosolska	3	6	[10]
4	(Poland) K Jans-Ignacik (Slovenia) A Klepač	6	4	[3]
(Chinese Taipei) C-w Chan (China) C Liang	1	0
2	(France) C Garcia (Slovenia) K Srebotnik	6	6

Semifinals
(Croatia) P Martić (Liechtenstein) S Vogt	6	3	[0]
3	(United States) B Mattek-Sands (Czech Republic) L Šafářová	4	6	[10]
(Spain) A Parra Santonja (Poland) A Rosolska	3	1
2	(France) C Garcia (Slovenia) K Srebotnik	6	6

Final
3	(United States) B Mattek-Sands (Czech Republic) L Šafářová	6	6
2	(France) C Garcia (Slovenia) K Srebotnik	4	3
