= 2015 Brisbane International – Men's doubles =

Coordinates: 27°31′30″S 153°0′26″E

Men's doubles
- 2015 Brisbane International

Final
- Champions: (United Kingdom) Jamie Murray (Australia) John Peers
- Runners-up: (Ukraine) Alexandr Dolgopolov (Japan) Kei Nishikori
- Score: 6–3, 7–6^{(7–4)}

Events
Singles	men	women
Doubles	men	women
- Brisbane International

Mariusz Fyrstenberg and Daniel Nestor are the defending champions, but chose not to participate together. Fyrstenberg played with Santiago González and lost in the first round to Robert Lindstedt and Marcin Matkowski. Nestor played with Rohan Bopanna and lost in the first round to Alexandr Dolgopolov and Kei Nishikori.
Jamie Murray and John Peers won the title, defeating Dolgopolov and Nishikori in the final, 6–3, 7–6^{(7–4)}.

== Seeds ==
1. (Netherlands) Jean-Julien Rojer / (Romania) Horia Tecău (first round)
2. (India) Rohan Bopanna / (Canada) Daniel Nestor (first round)
3. (Sweden) Robert Lindstedt / (Poland) Marcin Matkowski (quarterfinals)
4. (United States) Eric Butorac / (Australia) Sam Groth (quarterfinals)

== Draw ==
Key

- Q = Qualifier
- WC = Wild card
- LL = Lucky loser
- Alt = Alternate
- ITF = ITF entry
- PR = Protected ranking
- SR = Special ranking
- SE = Special exempt
- JE = Junior exempt
- JR = Junior Accelerator Programme entrant
- CO = College Accelerator Programme entrant
- NG = Next Gen Accelerator Program entrant
- w/o = Walkover
- r = Retired
- d = Defaulted

=== Draw ===
First round
1	(Netherlands) J-J Rojer (Romania) H Tecău	3	4
(United Kingdom) J Murray (Australia) J Peers	6	6
(Canada) M Raonic (Australia) B Tomic	6	2
(France) P-H Herbert (France) N Mahut	4	0^{r}
4	(United States) E Butorac (Australia) S Groth	6	7
(Austria) J Melzer (France) G Simon	4	5
(United States) S Johnson (United States) S Querrey	6	6
(Croatia) M Draganja (Finland) H Kontinen	2	4
WC	(Bulgaria) G Dimitrov (Australia) T Kokkinakis	6	3	[10]
(France) J Chardy (Poland) Ł Kubot	3	6	[8]
(Poland) M Fyrstenberg (Mexico) S González	2	3
3	(Sweden) R Lindstedt (Poland) M Matkowski	6	6
(Australia) C Guccione (Australia) L Hewitt	6	6
WC	(Australia) J Duckworth (Australia) M Matosevic	2	4
(Ukraine) A Dolgopolov (Japan) K Nishikori	6	3	[10]
2	(India) R Bopanna (Canada) D Nestor	4	6	[6]

Quarterfinals
(United Kingdom) J Murray (Australia) J Peers	6	7
(Canada) M Raonic (Australia) B Tomic	4	5
4	(United States) E Butorac (Australia) S Groth	6	5	[6]
(United States) S Johnson (United States) S Querrey	3	7	[10]
WC	(Bulgaria) G Dimitrov (Australia) T Kokkinakis	6	6^{2}	[10]
3	(Sweden) R Lindstedt (Poland) M Matkowski	3	7^{7}	[7]
(Australia) C Guccione (Australia) L Hewitt	2	5
(Ukraine) A Dolgopolov (Japan) K Nishikori	6	7

Semifinals
(United Kingdom) J Murray (Australia) J Peers	7^{7}	7^{7}
(United States) S Johnson (United States) S Querrey	6^{3}	6^{2}
WC	(Bulgaria) G Dimitrov (Australia) T Kokkinakis	3	3
(Ukraine) A Dolgopolov (Japan) K Nishikori	6	6

Final
(United Kingdom) J Murray (Australia) J Peers	6	7^{7}
(Ukraine) A Dolgopolov (Japan) K Nishikori	3	6^{4}
