= 2015 Brisbane International – Men's singles =

Coordinates: 27°31′30″S 153°0′26″E

Men's singles
- 2015 Brisbane International

Final
- Champion: (Switzerland) Roger Federer
- Runner-up: (Canada) Milos Raonic
- Score: 6–4, 6–7^{(2–7)}, 6–4

Details
- Draw: 28 (4 Q / 3 WC )
- Seeds: 8

Events
Singles	men	women
Doubles	men	women
- Brisbane International

Lleyton Hewitt was the defending champion, but lost to compatriot Sam Groth in the first round.

Roger Federer won the title, defeating Milos Raonic in the final, 6–4, 6–7^{(2–7)}, 6–4, and in the process recorded his 1,000th match victory on the professional tour.

== Seeds ==
The top four seeds receive a bye into the second round.

1. (Switzerland) Roger Federer (champion)
2. (Japan) Kei Nishikori (semifinals)
3. (Canada) Milos Raonic (final)
4. (Bulgaria) Grigor Dimitrov (semifinals)
5. (South Africa) Kevin Anderson (first round)
6. (France) Gilles Simon (first round)
7. (Ukraine) Alexandr Dolgopolov (second round)
8. (France) Julien Benneteau (first round)

== Draw ==
=== Finals ===
Semifinals
1	(Switzerland) Roger Federer	6	6
4	(Bulgaria) Grigor Dimitrov	2	2
3	(Canada) Milos Raonic	6^{4}	7^{7}	7^{7}
2	(Japan) Kei Nishikori	7^{7}	6^{4}	6^{4}

Final
1	(Switzerland) Roger Federer	6	6^{2}	6
3	(Canada) Milos Raonic	4	7^{7}	4

=== Top half ===
First round
Q	(United States) R Williams	3	1
WC	(Australia) J Millman	6	6
Q	(United States) D Kudla	6	1	4
(Finland) J Nieminen	4	6	6
WC	(Australia) J Duckworth	6	6
6	(France) G Simon	2	2
(France) J Chardy	6	6
(Kazakhstan) A Golubev	4	4
(Slovakia) M Kližan	6^{5}	7^{8}	6
PR	(Austria) J Melzer	7^{7}	6^{6}	1
(Argentina) C Berlocq	2	3
7	(Ukraine) A Dolgopolov	6	6

Second round
1	(Switzerland) R Federer	4	6	6
WC	(Australia) J Millman	6	4	3
(Finland) J Nieminen	6	6^{5}	3
WC	(Australia) J Duckworth	4	7^{7}	6
4	(Bulgaria) G Dimitrov	3	6	7^{10}
(France) J Chardy	6	4	6^{8}
(Slovakia) M Kližan	1	7^{8}	7^{9}
7	(Ukraine) A Dolgopolov	6	6^{6}	6^{7}

Quarterfinals
1	(Switzerland) R Federer	6	6
WC	(Australia) J Duckworth	0	1
4	(Bulgaria) G Dimitrov	6	6
(Slovakia) M Kližan	3	4

Semifinals
1	(Switzerland) R Federer	6	6
4	(Bulgaria) G Dimitrov	2	2

=== Bottom half ===
First round
5	(South Africa) K Anderson	6^{3}	4
Q	(Poland) Ł Kubot	7^{7}	6
(Australia) S Groth	6	6
(Australia) L Hewitt	3	2
Q	(Romania) M Copil	4	6	4
(Kazakhstan) M Kukushkin	6	4	6
8	(France) J Benneteau	4	3
WC	(Australia) T Kokkinakis	6	6
(Australia) B Tomic	7	7^{7}
(United States) S Querrey	5	6^{5}
(Australia) M Matosevic	6	6^{0}	5
(United States) S Johnson	2	7^{7}	7

Second round
Q	(Poland) Ł Kubot	4	7^{7}	6^{3}
(Australia) S Groth	6	6^{2}	7^{7}
(Kazakhstan) M Kukushkin	3	4
3	(Canada) M Raonic	6	6
WC	(Australia) T Kokkinakis	6^{2}	1
(Australia) B Tomic	7^{7}	6
(United States) S Johnson	4	5
2	(Japan) K Nishikori	6	7

Quarterfinals
(Australia) S Groth	6^{5}	6	6^{2}
3	(Canada) M Raonic	7^{7}	3	7^{7}
(Australia) B Tomic	0	4
2	(Japan) K Nishikori	6	6

Semifinals
3	(Canada) M Raonic	6^{4}	7^{7}	7^{7}
2	(Japan) K Nishikori	7^{7}	6^{4}	6^{4}

== Qualifying ==
=== Seeds ===
1. (Germany) Tobias Kamke (second round)
2. (Serbia) Viktor Troicki (qualifying competition)
3. (Turkey) Marsel İlhan (qualifying competition)
4. (France) Pierre-Hugues Herbert (second round)
5. (United States) Tim Smyczek (second round)
6. (United States) Denis Kudla (qualified)
7. (Slovakia) Norbert Gombos (second round)
8. (France) Lucas Pouille (first round)

=== Qualifiers ===
1. (Poland) Łukasz Kubot
2. (United States) Denis Kudla
3. (Romania) Marius Copil
4. (United States) Rhyne Williams

=== Qualifying draw ===
==== First qualifier ====
First round
1	(Germany) Tobias Kamke	4	7	6
WC	(Australia) Blake Mott	6	5	2
WC	(Australia) Harry Bourchier	6^{3}	6	1
(Canada) Frank Dancevic	7^{7}	4	6
(United States) Alex Kuznetsov	3	2
(Poland) Łukasz Kubot	6	6
(Japan) Yasutaka Uchiyama	6	6
8	(France) Lucas Pouille	3	2

Second round
1	(Germany) Tobias Kamke	5	3
(Canada) Frank Dancevic	7	6
(Poland) Łukasz Kubot	6	6^{4}	6
(Japan) Yasutaka Uchiyama	4	7^{7}	2

Qualifying competition
(Canada) Frank Dancevic	3	2
(Poland) Łukasz Kubot	6	6

==== Second qualifier ====
First round
2	(Serbia) Viktor Troicki	6	7^{7}
WC	(Australia) Maverick Banes	3	6^{4}
(Slovakia) Miloslav Mečíř Jr.	3	6	6
(Poland) Michał Przysiężny	6	3	4
(Japan) Taro Daniel	6	6
(Croatia) Antonio Veić	4	3
WC	(Australia) Dane Propoggia	2	4
6	(United States) Denis Kudla	6	6

Second round
2	(Serbia) Viktor Troicki	7^{7}	2	7^{13}
(Slovakia) Miloslav Mečíř Jr.	6^{5}	6	6^{11}
(Japan) Taro Daniel	6	5	3
6	(United States) Denis Kudla	3	7	6

Qualifying competition
2	(Serbia) Viktor Troicki	4	2
6	(United States) Denis Kudla	6	6

==== Third qualifier ====
First round
3	(Turkey) Marsel İlhan	4	7	6
(Slovakia) Jozef Kovalík	6	5	2
(Italy) Roberto Marcora	6^{3}	7^{7}	5
(Czech Republic) Jan Mertl	7^{7}	6^{2}	7
(Romania) Marius Copil	1	6	6
(Italy) Andrea Arnaboldi	6	3	2
(United States) Robby Ginepri	1	1
5	(United States) Tim Smyczek	6	6

Second round
3	(Turkey) Marsel İlhan	6	3	7
(Czech Republic) Jan Mertl	4	6	5
(Romania) Marius Copil	6	7^{7}
5	(United States) Tim Smyczek	3	6^{3}

Qualifying competition
3	(Turkey) Marsel İlhan	2	3
(Romania) Marius Copil	6	6

==== Fourth qualifier ====
First round
4	(France) Pierre-Hugues Herbert	7^{7}	6
(Germany) Alexander Zverev	6^{2}	4
(Czech Republic) Jan Hernych	6^{5}	3
(United States) Rhyne Williams	7^{7}	6
(Chile) Hans Podlipnik Castillo	4	6^{5}
(Australia) Matt Reid	6	7^{7}
(Spain) Enrique López Pérez	7^{7}	2	4
7	(Slovakia) Norbert Gombos	6^{5}	6	6

Second round
4	(France) Pierre-Hugues Herbert	3	1
(United States) Rhyne Williams	6	6
(Australia) Matt Reid	3	7^{13}	7^{7}
7	(Slovakia) Norbert Gombos	6	6^{11}	6^{3}

Qualifying competition
(United States) Rhyne Williams	6	6
(Australia) Matt Reid	3	4
