= 2015 Brisbane International =

Coordinates: 27°31′30″S 153°0′26″E

- Date: 4–11 January 2015
- Edition: 7th
- Surface: Hard / outdoor
- Location: Tennyson, Brisbane, Queensland, Australia
- Venue: Queensland Tennis Centre

Champions

Men's singles
- (Switzerland) Roger Federer

Women's singles
- (Russia) Maria Sharapova

Men's doubles
- (United Kingdom) Jamie Murray / (Australia) John Peers

Women's doubles
- (Switzerland) Martina Hingis / (Germany) Sabine Lisicki
- Brisbane International

The 2015 Brisbane International was a tournament of the 2015 ATP World Tour and 2015 WTA Tour. It was played on outdoor hard courts in Brisbane, Queensland, Australia. It was the sixth edition of the tournament and took place at the Queensland Tennis Centre in Tennyson. It was held from 4 to 11 January 2015. It was part of the Australian Open Series in preparation for the first Grand Slam of the year.

It was announced on 1 September 2014 that Roger Federer had again committed to the event. Federer and Sharapova won the singles titles.

== Points and prize money ==
=== Point distribution ===
Event	W	F	SF	QF	Round of 16	Round of 32	Q	Q3	Q2	Q1
Men's singles	250	150	90	45	20	0	12	6	0	0
Men's doubles	250	150	90	45	0	—N/a	—N/a	—N/a	—N/a	—N/a
Women's singles	470	305	185	100	55	1	25	18	13	1
Women's doubles	470	305	185	100	1	—N/a	—N/a	—N/a	—N/a	—N/a

=== Prize money ===
Event	W	F	SF	QF	Round of 16	Round of 32^{1}	Q3	Q2	Q1
Men's singles	$82,040	$43,210	$23,405	$13,335	$7,860	$4,655	$750	$360	—N/a
Men's doubles *	$24,920	$13,100	$7,100	$4,060	$2,380	—N/a	—N/a	—N/a	—N/a
Women's singles	$195,026	$104,014	$55,827	$22,141	$11,874	$6,477	$3,327	$1,770	$1,003
Women's doubles *	$45,576	$23,987	$13,194	$6,716	$3,640	—N/a	—N/a	—N/a	—N/a

_{^{1}Qualifiers prize money is also the Round of 32 prize money.}
_{*per team}

== ATP singles main-draw entrants ==
=== Seeds ===
Country	Player	Rank^{1}	Seed
SUI	Roger Federer	2	1
JPN	Kei Nishikori	5	2
CAN	Milos Raonic	8	3
BUL	Grigor Dimitrov	11	4
RSA	Kevin Anderson	16	5
FRA	Gilles Simon	21	6
UKR	Alexandr Dolgopolov	23	7
FRA	Julien Benneteau	25	8

- ^{1} Rankings as of December 29, 2014.

=== Other entrants ===
The following players received wildcards into the singles main draw:

- (Australia) James Duckworth
- (Australia) Thanasi Kokkinakis
- (Australia) John Millman

The following player received entry using a protected ranking into the singles main draw:

- (Austria) Jürgen Melzer

The following players received entry from the qualifying draw:

- (Poland) Łukasz Kubot
- (United States) Denis Kudla
- (Romania) Marius Copil
- (United States) Rhyne Williams

=== Withdrawals ===
Before the tournament

- (Croatia) Marin Čilić → replaced by (Kazakhstan) Andrey Golubev
- (United States) Donald Young → replaced by (Australia) Marinko Matosevic
- (Argentina) Juan Martín del Potro → replaced by (Australia) Sam Groth

== ATP doubles main-draw entrants ==
=== Seeds ===
Country	Player	Country	Player	Rank^{1}	Seed
NLD	Jean-Julien Rojer	ROU	Horia Tecău	32	1
IND	Rohan Bopanna	CAN	Daniel Nestor	34	2
SWE	Robert Lindstedt	POL	Marcin Matkowski	40	3
USA	Eric Butorac	AUS	Sam Groth	51	4

- ^{1} Rankings as of December 29, 2014.

=== Other entrants ===
The following pairs received wildcards into the doubles main draw:

- (Bulgaria) Grigor Dimitrov / (Australia) Thanasi Kokkinakis
- (Australia) James Duckworth / (Australia) Marinko Matosevic

== WTA singles main-draw entrants ==
=== Seeds ===
Country	Player	Rank^{1}	Seed
RUS	Maria Sharapova	2	1
SRB	Ana Ivanovic	7	2
GER	Angelique Kerber	9	3
SVK	Dominika Cibulková	11	4
GER	Andrea Petkovic	13	5
SRB	Jelena Janković	16	6
ESP	Carla Suárez Navarro	17	7
~~ESP~~	~~Garbiñe Muguruza~~	~~20~~	~~8~~

- ^{1} Rankings as of January 5, 2015.

=== Other entrants ===
The following players received wildcards into the singles main draw:

- (Australia) Jarmila Gajdošová
- (Croatia) Ajla Tomljanović

The following player received entry using a protected ranking into the singles main draw:

- (United States) Bethanie Mattek-Sands

The following players received entry from the qualifying draw:

- (United States) Madison Brengle
- (Russia) Daria Gavrilova
- (Kazakhstan) Yaroslava Shvedova
- (Ukraine) Lesia Tsurenko

The following player received entry as lucky loser:

- (Russia) Alla Kudryavtseva

=== Withdrawals ===
Before the tournament

- (Italy) Camila Giorgi (mouth injury) → (United States) replaced by Bethanie Mattek-Sands
- (Spain) Garbiñe Muguruza (ankle injury) → (Russia) replaced by Alla Kudryavtseva

== WTA doubles main-draw entrants ==
=== Seeds ===
Country	Player	Country	Player	Rank^{1}	Seed
TPE	Hsieh Su-wei	IND	Sania Mirza	11	1
USA	Raquel Kops-Jones	USA	Abigail Spears	24	2
TPE	Chan Hao-ching	CZE	Květa Peschke	36	3
FRA	Caroline Garcia	SLO	Katarina Srebotnik	36	4

- ^{1} Rankings as of December 29, 2014.

=== Other entrants ===
The following pairs received wildcards into the doubles main draw:

- (Serbia) Ana Ivanovic / (Germany) Angelique Kerber
- (Croatia) Mirjana Lučić-Baroni / (United States) Lisa Raymond
- (Russia) Daria Gavrilova / (Australia) Storm Sanders

=== Withdrawals ===
During the tournament

- (Serbia) Ana Ivanovic (abdominal injury)

== Champions ==
=== Men's singles ===
- (Switzerland) Roger Federer def. (Canada) Milos Raonic, 6–4, 6–7^{(2–7)}, 6–4.

=== Women's singles ===
- (Russia) Maria Sharapova def. (Serbia) Ana Ivanovic, 6–7^{(4–7)}, 6–3, 6–3.

=== Men's doubles ===
- (United Kingdom) Jamie Murray / (Australia) John Peers def. (Ukraine) Alexandr Dolgopolov / (Japan) Kei Nishikori, 6–3, 7–6^{(7–4)}.

=== Women's doubles ===
- (Switzerland) Martina Hingis / (Germany) Sabine Lisicki def. (France) Caroline Garcia / (Slovenia) Katarina Srebotnik, 6–2, 7–5.
