= 2015 Brisbane International – Women's singles =

Coordinates: 27°31′30″S 153°0′26″E

Women's singles
- 2015 Brisbane International

Final
- Champion: (Russia) Maria Sharapova
- Runner-up: (Serbia) Ana Ivanovic
- Score: 6–7^{(4–7)}, 6–3, 6–3

Details
- Draw: 30
- Seeds: 8

Events
Singles	men	women
Doubles	men	women
- Brisbane International

Serena Williams was the two-time defending champion, but she chose to participate at the Hopman Cup instead.

Maria Sharapova won the title, defeating Ana Ivanovic in the final 6–7^{(4–7)}, 6–3, 6–3.

== Seeds ==
The top two seeds receive a bye into the second round.

1. (Russia) Maria Sharapova (champion)
2. (Serbia) Ana Ivanovic (final)
3. (Germany) Angelique Kerber (quarterfinals)
4. (Slovakia) Dominika Cibulková (first round)
5. (Germany) Andrea Petkovic (first round)
6. (Serbia) Jelena Janković (first round)
7. (Spain) Carla Suárez Navarro (quarterfinals)
8. (Spain) Garbiñe Muguruza (withdrew because of an ankle injury)

== Draw ==
=== Finals ===
Semifinals
1	(Russia) Maria Sharapova	6	6
(Ukraine) Elina Svitolina	1	3
(United States) Varvara Lepchenko	6^{2}	4
2	(Serbia) Ana Ivanovic	7^{7}	6

Final
1	(Russia) Maria Sharapova	6^{4}	6	6
2	(Serbia) Ana Ivanovic	7^{7}	3	3

=== Top half ===
First round
Q	(Kazakhstan) Y Shvedova	0	7	6
(Germany) S Lisicki	6	5	4
(Croatia) M Lučić-Baroni	6	6
(United States) C McHale	3	0
(Bulgaria) T Pironkova	6	2	1
7	(Spain) C Suárez Navarro	3	6	6
3	(Germany) A Kerber	6	6
(France) C Garcia	4	3
Q	(Russia) D Gavrilova	7	6
(United States) A Riske	5	3
(Ukraine) E Svitolina	6	6
(Slovakia) M Rybáriková	0	2
WC	(Croatia) A Tomljanović	7^{8}	6
6	(Serbia) J Janković	6^{6}	0

Second round
1	(Russia) M Sharapova	6	6
Q	(Kazakhstan) Y Shvedova	0	1
(Croatia) M Lučić-Baroni	7	3	4
7	(Spain) C Suárez Navarro	5	6	6
3	(Germany) A Kerber	6	7
Q	(Russia) D Gavrilova	3	5
(Ukraine) E Svitolina	6	6
WC	(Croatia) A Tomljanović	3	2

Quarterfinals
1	(Russia) M Sharapova	6	6
7	(Spain) C Suárez Navarro	1	3
3	(Germany) A Kerber	6	5	3
(Ukraine) E Svitolina	4	7	6

Semifinals
1	(Russia) M Sharapova	6	6
(Ukraine) E Svitolina	1	3

=== Bottom half ===
First round
LL	(Russia) A Kudryavtseva	6	6
PR	(United States) B Mattek-Sands	4	2
(Czech Republic) Ka Plíšková	4	7^{9}	6
(Belarus) V Azarenka	6	6^{7}	4
(Australia) S Stosur	6	4	5
(United States) V Lepchenko	4	6	7
(United States) M Keys	7	6
4	(Slovakia) D Cibulková	5	2
5	(Germany) A Petkovic	4	7	4
(Estonia) K Kanepi	6	5	6
Q	(Ukraine) L Tsurenko	6^{6}	3
Q	(United States) M Brengle	7^{8}	6
WC	(Australia) J Gajdošová	6	6
(China) S Zhang	4	1

Second round
LL	(Russia) A Kudryavtseva	4	6	6
(Czech Republic) Ka Plíšková	6	3	3
(United States) V Lepchenko	6	6
(United States) M Keys	4	4
(Estonia) K Kanepi	6	7^{7}
Q	(United States) M Brengle	3	6^{3}
WC	(Australia) J Gajdošová	4	1
2	(Serbia) A Ivanovic	6	6

Quarterfinals
LL	(Russia) A Kudryavtseva	5	5
(United States) V Lepchenko	7	7
(Estonia) K Kanepi	6	4	3
2	(Serbia) A Ivanovic	4	6	6

Semifinals
(United States) V Lepchenko	6^{2}	4
2	(Serbia) A Ivanovic	7^{7}	6

== Qualifying ==
=== Seeds ===
1. (Kazakhstan) Yaroslava Shvedova (qualified)
2. (Japan) Kimiko Date-Krumm (second round)
3. (Ukraine) Lesia Tsurenko (qualified)
4. (United States) Madison Brengle (qualified)
5. (Russia) Alla Kudryavtseva (qualifying competition, Lucky loser)
6. (Brazil) Teliana Pereira (first round)
7. (Montenegro) Danka Kovinić (first round)
8. (United States) Irina Falconi (qualifying competition)

=== Qualifiers ===
1. (Kazakhstan) Yaroslava Shvedova
2. (Russia) Daria Gavrilova
3. (Ukraine) Lesia Tsurenko
4. (United States) Madison Brengle

=== Lucky loser ===
1. (Russia) Alla Kudryavtseva

=== Qualifying draw ===
==== First qualifier ====
First round
1	(Kazakhstan) Yaroslava Shvedova	7^{7}	6
(Argentina) Paula Ormaechea	6^{3}	2
(Poland) Paula Kania	3	6	6
WC	(Australia) Abbie Myers	6	4	3
(Australia) Olivia Rogowska	6	2	6^{4}
(Ukraine) Maryna Zanevska	4	6	7^{7}
(Serbia) Jovana Jakšić	6	6
6	(Brazil) Teliana Pereira	3	2

Second round
1	(Kazakhstan) Yaroslava Shvedova	6	6
(Poland) Paula Kania	4	2
(Ukraine) Maryna Zanevska	6	6
(Serbia) Jovana Jakšić	1	4

Qualifying competition
1	(Kazakhstan) Yaroslava Shvedova	7	6
(Ukraine) Maryna Zanevska	5	4

==== Second qualifier ====
First round
2	(Japan) Kimiko Date-Krumm	6	6
(Australia) Arina Rodionova	3	3
(Russia) Elizaveta Kulichkova	6	6
WC	(Australia) Lizette Cabrera	3	3
(Russia) Alexandra Panova	6^{6}	4
(France) Virginie Razzano	7^{8}	6
(Russia) Daria Gavrilova	7^{9}	6
7	(Montenegro) Danka Kovinić	6^{7}	3

Second round
2	(Japan) Kimiko Date-Krumm	4	0
(Russia) Elizaveta Kulichkova	6	6
(France) Virginie Razzano	4	2
(Russia) Daria Gavrilova	6	6

Qualifying competition
(Russia) Elizaveta Kulichkova	6^{2}	4
(Russia) Daria Gavrilova	7^{7}	6

==== Third qualifier ====
First round
3	(Ukraine) Lesia Tsurenko	7^{7}	6
PR	(Germany) Tatjana Maria	6^{4}	4
WC	(Australia) Naiktha Bains	6^{6}	3
(Canada) Gabriela Dabrowski	7^{8}	6
(Slovakia) Kristína Kučová	3	6^{4}
(United States) Julia Boserup	6	7^{7}
(France) Alizé Lim	4	5
5	(Russia) Alla Kudryavtseva	6	7

Second round
3	(Ukraine) Lesia Tsurenko	6	6
(Canada) Gabriela Dabrowski	3	1
(United States) Julia Boserup	3	1
5	(Russia) Alla Kudryavtseva	6	6

Qualifying competition
3	(Ukraine) Lesia Tsurenko	6	7^{7}
5	(Russia) Alla Kudryavtseva	4	6^{4}

==== Fourth qualifier ====
First round
4	(United States) Madison Brengle	6	4	6
(Chinese Taipei) Hsieh Su-wei	2	6	3
(Netherlands) Michaëlla Krajicek	6	3	4
(Netherlands) Richèl Hogenkamp	2	6	6
WC	(Australia) Storm Sanders	3	6	4
(Australia) Anastasia Rodionova	6	2	6
(Russia) Evgeniya Rodina	1	3
8	(United States) Irina Falconi	6	6

Second round
4	(United States) Madison Brengle	6	6
(Netherlands) Richèl Hogenkamp	4	1
(Australia) Anastasia Rodionova	4	5
8	(United States) Irina Falconi	6	7

Qualifying competition
4	(United States) Madison Brengle	6	6
8	(United States) Irina Falconi	2	0
