= 2015 Porsche Tennis Grand Prix – Singles =

Singles
- 2015 Porsche Tennis Grand Prix

Final
- Champion: (Germany) Angelique Kerber
- Runner-up: (Denmark) Caroline Wozniacki
- Score: 3–6, 6–1, 7–5

Events
Singles	Doubles
- Porsche Tennis Grand Prix

Maria Sharapova was the three-time defending champion, but lost in the second round to Angelique Kerber.

Kerber went on to win the title, defeating Caroline Wozniacki in the final, 3–6, 6–1, 7–5.

== Seeds ==
The top four seeds receive a bye into the second round.

1. (Russia) Maria Sharapova (second round)
2. (Romania) Simona Halep (semifinals)
3. (Czech Republic) Petra Kvitová (second round)
4. (Denmark) Caroline Wozniacki (final)
5. (Serbia) Ana Ivanovic (first round)
6. (Russia) Ekaterina Makarova (quarterfinals)
7. (Poland) Agnieszka Radwańska (first round)
8. (Spain) Carla Suárez Navarro (quarterfinals)

== Draw ==
Key

- Q = Qualifier
- WC = Wild card
- LL = Lucky loser
- Alt = Alternate
- ITF = ITF entry
- PR = Protected ranking
- SR = Special ranking
- SE = Special exempt
- JE = Junior exempt
- JR = Junior Accelerator Programme entrant
- CO = College Accelerator Programme entrant
- NG = Next Gen Accelerator Program entrant
- w/o = Walkover
- r = Retired
- d = Defaulted

=== Finals ===
Semifinals
(Germany) Angelique Kerber	6	6
(United States) Madison Brengle	3	1
4	(Denmark) Caroline Wozniacki	7	5	6
2	(Romania) Simona Halep	5	7	2

Final
(Germany) Angelique Kerber	3	6	7
4	(Denmark) Caroline Wozniacki	6	1	5

=== Top half ===
First round
LL	(United States) A Glatch	2	5
(Germany) A Kerber	6	7
Q	(Croatia) P Martić	4	2
LL	(Russia) M Melnikova	6	6
Q	(United States) B Mattek-Sands	4	6^{3}
6	(Russia) E Makarova	6	7^{7}
LL	(Italy) A Brianti	4	4
(United States) M Brengle	6	6
WC	(Germany) C Witthöft	7	6
(Germany) M Barthel	5	3
(France) C Garcia	7^{8}	6
5	(Serbia) A Ivanovic	6^{6}	4

Second round
1	(Russia) M Sharapova	6	5	1
(Germany) A Kerber	2	7	6
LL	(Russia) M Melnikova	2	3
6	(Russia) E Makarova	6	6
3	(Czech Republic) P Kvitová	3	6^{2}
(United States) M Brengle	6	7^{7}
WC	(Germany) C Witthöft	6^{4}	2
(France) C Garcia	7^{7}	6

Quarterfinals
(Germany) A Kerber	6	6
6	(Russia) E Makarova	3	2
(United States) M Brengle	3	6	6
(France) C Garcia	6	3	3

Semifinals
(Germany) A Kerber	6	6
(United States) M Brengle	3	1

=== Bottom half ===
First round
8	(Spain) C Suárez Navarro	6	6^{5}	6
Q	(Russia) E Rodina	2	7^{7}	4
WC	(Germany) J Görges	6	3	5
(Switzerland) B Bencic	3	6	7
Q	(Ukraine) K Bondarenko	6^{8}	4
(Czech Republic) L Šafářová	7^{10}	6
7	(Poland) A Radwańska	6^{8}	4
(Italy) S Errani	7^{10}	6
(Germany) S Lisicki	0	0
(Kazakhstan) Z Diyas	6	6
(Czech Republic) B Strýcová	1	4
(Spain) G Muguruza	6	6

Second round
8	(Spain) C Suárez Navarro	6	7^{7}
(Switzerland) B Bencic	4	6^{1}
(Czech Republic) L Šafářová	6^{5}	1
4	(Denmark) C Wozniacki	7^{7}	6
(Italy) S Errani	6	6
(Kazakhstan) Z Diyas	4	1
(Spain) G Muguruza	6	1	3
2	(Romania) S Halep	3	6	6

Quarterfinals
8	(Spain) C Suárez Navarro	0	3
4	(Denmark) C Wozniacki	6	6
(Italy) S Errani	4	4
2	(Romania) S Halep	6	6

Semifinals
4	(Denmark) C Wozniacki	7	5	6
2	(Romania) S Halep	5	7	2

== Qualifying ==
=== Seeds ===
1. (Bulgaria) Tsvetana Pironkova (first round)
2. (Belgium) Kirsten Flipkens (second round, retired)
3. (Czech Republic) Kateřina Siniaková (second round)
4. (Germany) Annika Beck (first round)
5. (Russia) Evgeniya Rodina (qualified)
6. (Czech Republic) Denisa Allertová (second round)
7. (Croatia) Ana Konjuh (second round)
8. (Poland) Magda Linette (second round)

=== Qualifiers ===
1. (United States) Bethanie Mattek-Sands
2. (Russia) Evgeniya Rodina
3. (Ukraine) Kateryna Bondarenko
4. (Croatia) Petra Martić

=== Lucky losers ===
1. (Italy) Alberta Brianti
2. (Russia) Marina Melnikova
3. (United States) Alexa Glatch

=== Draw ===
==== First qualifier ====
First round
1	(Bulgaria) Tsvetana Pironkova	3	4
(United States) Bethanie Mattek-Sands	6	6
(Germany) Anna-Lena Friedsam	6	0
(Germany) Dinah Pfizenmaier	1	0^{r}
(Japan) Risa Ozaki	0	4
(Italy) Alberta Brianti	6	6
WC	(Germany) Antonia Lottner	4	2
8	(Poland) Magda Linette	6	6

Second round
(United States) Bethanie Mattek-Sands	6	7^{7}
(Germany) Anna-Lena Friedsam	2	6^{4}
(Italy) Alberta Brianti	0	7^{7}	7
8	(Poland) Magda Linette	6	6^{4}	5

Qualifying competition
(United States) Bethanie Mattek-Sands	6	6
(Italy) Alberta Brianti	1	2

==== Second qualifier ====
First round
2	(Belgium) Kirsten Flipkens	6	6
(Slovakia) Kristína Kučová	0	3
WC	(Germany) Lena Rüffer	4	4
(Russia) Marina Melnikova	6	6
(Austria) Patricia Mayr-Achleitner	2	0
WC	(Germany) Katharina Hobgarski	6	6
(Czech Republic) Barbora Krejčíková	4	2
5	(Russia) Evgeniya Rodina	6	6

Second round
2	(Belgium) Kirsten Flipkens	1^{r}
(Russia) Marina Melnikova	2
WC	(Germany) Katharina Hobgarski	3	0
5	(Russia) Evgeniya Rodina	6	6

Qualifying competition
(Russia) Marina Melnikova	2	2
5	(Russia) Evgeniya Rodina	6	6

==== Third qualifier ====
First round
3	(Czech Republic) Kateřina Siniaková	6	7
(Liechtenstein) Stephanie Vogt	4	5
(Ukraine) Kateryna Bondarenko	6	6
WC	(Germany) Katharina Gerlach	2	1
(United States) Alexa Glatch	7^{7}	6
(Kazakhstan) Yulia Putintseva	6^{1}	4
(Poland) Paula Kania	6^{2}	3
7	(Croatia) Ana Konjuh	7^{7}	6

Second round
3	(Czech Republic) Kateřina Siniaková	2	2
(Ukraine) Kateryna Bondarenko	6	6
(United States) Alexa Glatch	6	3	6
7	(Croatia) Ana Konjuh	3	6	2

Qualifying competition
(Ukraine) Kateryna Bondarenko	0	6	6
(United States) Alexa Glatch	6	4	4

==== Fourth qualifier ====
First round
4	(Germany) Annika Beck	1	0
(Croatia) Petra Martić	6	6
(France) Stéphanie Foretz	3	3
(Bulgaria) Sesil Karatantcheva	6	6
(Ukraine) Yuliya Beygelzimer	3	6	6
(Uzbekistan) Nigina Abduraimova	6	1	3
(France) Virginie Razzano	6	4	0^{r}
6	(Czech Republic) Denisa Allertová	1	6	0

Second round
(Croatia) Petra Martić	7^{7}	4	6
(Bulgaria) Sesil Karatantcheva	6^{2}	6	2
(Ukraine) Yuliya Beygelzimer	5	6	6
6	(Czech Republic) Denisa Allertová	7	4	1

Qualifying competition
(Croatia) Petra Martić	3	7^{7}	6
(Ukraine) Yuliya Beygelzimer	6	6^{5}	4
