= 2015 WTA Finals – Doubles =

Doubles
- 2015 WTA Finals

Final
- Champions: (Switzerland) Martina Hingis (India) Sania Mirza
- Runners-up: (Spain) Garbiñe Muguruza (Spain) Carla Suárez Navarro
- Score: 6–0, 6–3

Details
- Draw: 8
- Seeds: 8

Events
Singles	Doubles
- WTA Finals

Defending champion Sania Mirza and her partner Martina Hingis defeated Garbiñe Muguruza and Carla Suárez Navarro in the final, 6–0, 6–3 to win the doubles tennis title at the 2015 WTA Finals.

Cara Black and Mirza were the reigning champions, but Black did not qualify this year.

== Seeds ==
1. (Switzerland) Martina Hingis / (India) Sania Mirza (champions)
2. (United States) Bethanie Mattek-Sands / (Czech Republic) Lucie Šafářová (round robin)
3. (Chinese Taipei) Chan Hao-ching / (Chinese Taipei) Chan Yung-jan (semifinals)
4. (Hungary) Tímea Babos / (France) Kristina Mladenovic (round robin)
5. (France) Caroline Garcia / (Slovenia) Katarina Srebotnik (round robin)
6. (United States) Raquel Kops-Jones / (United States) Abigail Spears (round robin)
7. (Czech Republic) Andrea Hlaváčková / (Czech Republic) Lucie Hradecká (semifinals)
8. (Spain) Garbiñe Muguruza / (Spain) Carla Suárez Navarro (final)

== Draw ==
Key

- Q = Qualifier
- WC = Wild card
- LL = Lucky loser
- Alt = Alternate
- ITF = ITF entry
- PR = Protected ranking
- SR = Special ranking
- SE = Special exempt
- JE = Junior exempt
- JR = Junior Accelerator Programme entrant
- CO = College Accelerator Programme entrant
- NG = Next Gen Accelerator Program entrant
- w/o = Walkover
- r = Retired
- d = Defaulted

=== Finals ===
Semifinals
1	(Switzerland) Martina Hingis (India) Sania Mirza	6	6
3	(Chinese Taipei) Chan Hao-ching (Chinese Taipei) Chan Yung-jan	4	2
8	(Spain) Garbiñe Muguruza (Spain) Carla Suárez Navarro	7^{8}	6
7	(Czech Republic) Andrea Hlaváčková (Czech Republic) Lucie Hradecká	6^{6}	0

Final
1	(Switzerland) Martina Hingis (India) Sania Mirza	6	6
8	(Spain) Garbiñe Muguruza (Spain) Carla Suárez Navarro	0	3

=== Red group ===
		(Switzerland) Hingis (India) Mirza	(Hungary) Babos (France) Mladenovic	(United States) Kops-Jones (United States) Spears	(Czech Republic) Hlaváčková (Czech Republic) Hradecká	RR W–L	Set W–L	Game W–L	Standings
1	(Switzerland) Martina Hingis (India) Sania Mirza		6–4, 7–5	6–4, 6–2	6–3, 6–4	3–0	6–0 (100%)	37–22 (62.7%)	1
4	(Hungary) Tímea Babos (France) Kristina Mladenovic	4–6, 5–7		7–6^{(7–5)}, 6–2	2–6, 1–6	1–2	2–4 (33.3%)	25–33 (43.1%)	3
6	(United States) Raquel Kops-Jones (United States) Abigail Spears	4–6, 2–6	6–7^{(5–7)}, 2–6		6–3, 3–6, [11–9]	1–2	2–5 (28.6%)	24–34 (41.4%)	4
7	(Czech Republic) Andrea Hlaváčková (Czech Republic) Lucie Hradecká	3–6, 4–6	6–2, 6–1	3–6, 6–3, [9–11]		1–2	3–4 (42.9%)	28–25 (52.8%)	2

=== White group ===
		(United States) Mattek-Sands (Czech Republic) Šafářová	(Chinese Taipei) Chan (Chinese Taipei) Chan	(France) Garcia (Slovenia) Srebotnik	(Spain) Muguruza (Spain) Suárez Navarro	RR W–L	Set W–L	Game W–L	Standings
2	(United States) Bethanie Mattek-Sands (Czech Republic) Lucie Šafářová		2–6, 2–6	2–6, 0–3 ret.	6–3, 7–6^{(7–1)}	1–2	2–4 (33.3%)	19–30 (38.8%)	4
3	(Chinese Taipei) Chan Hao-ching (Chinese Taipei) Chan Yung-jan	6–2, 6–2		6–4, 7–6^{(7–5)}	5–7, 4–6	2–1	4–2 (66.7%)	34–27 (55.7%)	2
5	(France) Caroline Garcia (Slovenia) Katarina Srebotnik	6–2, 3–0 ret.	4–6, 6–7^{(5–7)}		5–7, 2–6	1–2	2–4 (33.3%)	26–28 (48.1%)	3
8	(Spain) Garbiñe Muguruza (Spain) Carla Suárez Navarro	3–6, 6–7^{(1–7)}	7–5, 6–4	7–5, 6–2		2–1	4–2 (66.7%)	35–29 (54.7%)	1
