= 2015 Porsche Tennis Grand Prix =

- Date: 20–26 April
- Edition: 38th
- Draw: 28S / 16D
- Prize money: $731,000
- Surface: Clay / indoor
- Location: Stuttgart, Germany
- Venue: Porsche-Arena
- Attendance: 37,200

Champions

Singles
- (Germany) Angelique Kerber

Doubles
- (United States) Bethanie Mattek-Sands / (Czech Republic) Lucie Šafářová
← 2014 ·	Porsche Tennis Grand Prix	· 2016 →

The 2015 Porsche Tennis Grand Prix was a women's tennis tournament played on indoor clay courts. It was the 38th edition of the Porsche Tennis Grand Prix, and part of the Premier tournaments of the 2015 WTA Tour. It took place at the Porsche Arena in Stuttgart, Germany, from 20 April through 26 April 2015. Unseeded Angelique Kerber won the singles title.

== Finals ==
=== Singles ===
- (Germany) Angelique Kerber defeated (Denmark) Caroline Wozniacki, 3–6, 6–1, 7–5

=== Doubles ===
- (United States) Bethanie Mattek-Sands / (Czech Republic) Lucie Šafářová defeated (France) Caroline Garcia / (Slovenia) Katarina Srebotnik, 6–4, 6–3

== Points and prize money ==
=== Point distribution ===
Event	W	F	SF	QF	Round of 16	Round of 32	Q	Q3	Q2	Q1
Singles	470	305	185	100	55	1	25	18	13	1
Doubles	470	305	185	100	1	—	—	—	—	—

=== Prize money ===
Event	W	F	SF	QF	Round of 16	Round of 32	Q3	Q2	Q1
Singles	$124,000	$66,000	$35,455	$19,050	$10,220	$5,580	$2,920	$1,555	$860
Doubles *	$39,000	$20,650	$11,360	$5,875	$3,140	—	—	—	—

_{* per team}

== Singles main draw entrants ==
=== Seeds ===
Country	Player	Rank^{1}	Seed
RUS	Maria Sharapova	2	1
ROU	Simona Halep	3	2
CZE	Petra Kvitová	4	3
DEN	Caroline Wozniacki	5	4
SRB	Ana Ivanovic	6	5
RUS	Ekaterina Makarova	8	6
POL	Agnieszka Radwańska	9	7
ESP	Carla Suárez Navarro	10	8

- ^{1} Rankings are as of April 13, 2015.

=== Other entrants ===
The following players received wildcards into the main draw:

- (Germany) Julia Görges
- (Germany) Carina Witthöft

The following players received entry from the qualifying draw:

- (Ukraine) Kateryna Bondarenko
- (Croatia) Petra Martić
- (United States) Bethanie Mattek-Sands
- (Russia) Evgeniya Rodina

The following players received entry as lucky losers:

- (Italy) Alberta Brianti
- (United States) Alexa Glatch
- (Russia) Marina Melnikova

=== Withdrawals ===
Before the tournament

- (Canada) Eugenie Bouchard →replaced by (United States) Madison Brengle
- (Serbia) Jelena Janković (right foot injury) →replaced by (United States) Alexa Glatch
- (Russia) Svetlana Kuznetsova (left adductor) →replaced by (Italy) Alberta Brianti
- (China) Peng Shuai →replaced by (Kazakhstan) Zarina Diyas
- (Germany) Andrea Petkovic (left thigh injury) →replaced by (Russia) Marina Melnikova

== Doubles main draw entrants ==
=== Seeds ===
Country	Player	Country	Player	Rank^{1}	Seed
SUI	Martina Hingis	IND	Sania Mirza	5	1
FRA	Caroline Garcia	SLO	Katarina Srebotnik	43	2
USA	Bethanie Mattek-Sands	CZE	Lucie Šafářová	49	3
POL	Klaudia Jans-Ignacik	SLO	Andreja Klepač	72	4

- Rankings are as of April 13, 2015.

=== Other entrants ===
The following pairs received wildcards into the main draw:

- (Switzerland) Belinda Bencic / (Romania) Simona Halep
- (Germany) Antonia Lottner / (Germany) Carina Witthöft
