= 2015 WTA Finals – Singles =

Singles
- 2015 WTA Finals

Final
- Champion: (Poland) Agnieszka Radwańska
- Runner-up: (Czech Republic) Petra Kvitová
- Score: 6–2, 4–6, 6–3

Details
- Draw: 8 (RR + elimination)
- Seeds: 8

Events
Singles	Doubles
- WTA Finals

Agnieszka Radwańska defeated Petra Kvitová in the final, 6–2, 4–6, 6–3 to win the singles tennis title at the 2015 WTA Finals. This marked the first time since 2005 that the Tour Finals champion did not win a major in the corresponding year.

Serena Williams was the three-time reigning champion, but withdrew due to injury.

Garbiñe Muguruza, Flavia Pennetta and Lucie Šafářová made their debuts at the event.

For the first time since the round-robin format was re-introduced in 2003, both finalists reached the final despite both losing two matches in the round-robin stage. This was also the first, and only, time two players lost 2 round-robin matches and still made it to the semifinals.

This year marked the first time since 2006 that all participating players came from European countries.

== Seeds ==
1. (Romania) Simona Halep (round robin)
2. (Spain) Garbiñe Muguruza (semifinals)
3. (Russia) Maria Sharapova (semifinals)
4. (Czech Republic) Petra Kvitová (final)
5. (Poland) Agnieszka Radwańska (champion)
6. (Germany) Angelique Kerber (round robin)
7. (Italy) Flavia Pennetta (round robin)
8. (Czech Republic) Lucie Šafářová (round robin)

Notes:

- (United States) Serena Williams had qualified but withdrew from the tournament

== Alternates ==
1. (United States) Venus Williams (Not used)
2. (Spain) Carla Suárez Navarro (Not used)

== Draw ==
Key

- Q = Qualifier
- WC = Wild card
- LL = Lucky loser
- Alt = Alternate
- ITF = ITF entry
- PR = Protected ranking
- SR = Special ranking
- SE = Special exempt
- JE = Junior exempt
- JR = Junior Accelerator Programme entrant
- CO = College Accelerator Programme entrant
- NG = Next Gen Accelerator Program entrant
- w/o = Walkover
- r = Retired
- d = Defaulted

=== Finals ===
Semifinals
3	(Russia) Maria Sharapova	3	6^{3}
4	(Czech Republic) Petra Kvitová	6	7^{7}
2	(Spain) Garbiñe Muguruza	7^{7}	3	5
5	(Poland) Agnieszka Radwańska	6^{5}	6	7

Final
4	(Czech Republic) Petra Kvitová	2	6	3
5	(Poland) Agnieszka Radwańska	6	4	6

=== Red group ===
		(Romania) Halep	(Russia) Sharapova	(Poland) Radwańska	(Italy) Pennetta	RR; W–L	Set; W–L	Game; W–L	Standings
1	(Romania) Simona Halep		4–6, 4–6	6–7^{(5–7)}, 1–6	6–0, 6–3	1–2	2–4 (33.3%)	27–28 (49.1%)	3
3	(Russia) Maria Sharapova	6–4, 6–4		4–6, 6–3, 6–4	7–5, 6–1	3–0	6–1 (85.7%)	41–27 (60.3%)	1
5	(Poland) Agnieszka Radwańska	7–6^{(7–5)}, 6–1	6–4, 3–6, 4–6		6–7^{(5–7)}, 4–6	1–2	3–4 (42.9%)	36–36 (50%)	2
7	(Italy) Flavia Pennetta	0–6, 3–6	5–7, 1–6	7–6^{(7–5)}, 6–4		1–2	2–4 (33.3%)	22–35 (38.6%)	4

=== White group ===
		(Spain) Muguruza	(Czech Republic) Kvitová	(Germany) Kerber	(Czech Republic) Šafářová	RR; W–L	Set; W–L	Game; W–L	Standings
2	(Spain) Garbiñe Muguruza		6–4, 4–6, 7–5	6–4, 6–4	6–3, 7–6^{(7–4)}	3–0	6–1 (85.7%)	42–32 (56.8%)	1
4	(Czech Republic) Petra Kvitová	4–6, 6–4, 5–7		2–6, 6–7^{(3–7)}	7–5, 7–5	1–2	3–4 (42.9%)	37–40 (48.1%)	2
6	(Germany) Angelique Kerber	4–6, 4–6	6–2, 7–6^{(7–3)}		4–6, 3–6	1–2	2–4 (33.3%)	28–32 (46.7%)	4
8	(Czech Republic) Lucie Šafářová	3–6, 6–7^{(4–7)}	5–7, 5–7	6–4, 6–3		1–2	2–4 (33.3%)	31–34 (47.7%)	3
