= 2015 WTA Tour =

Women's tennis circuit

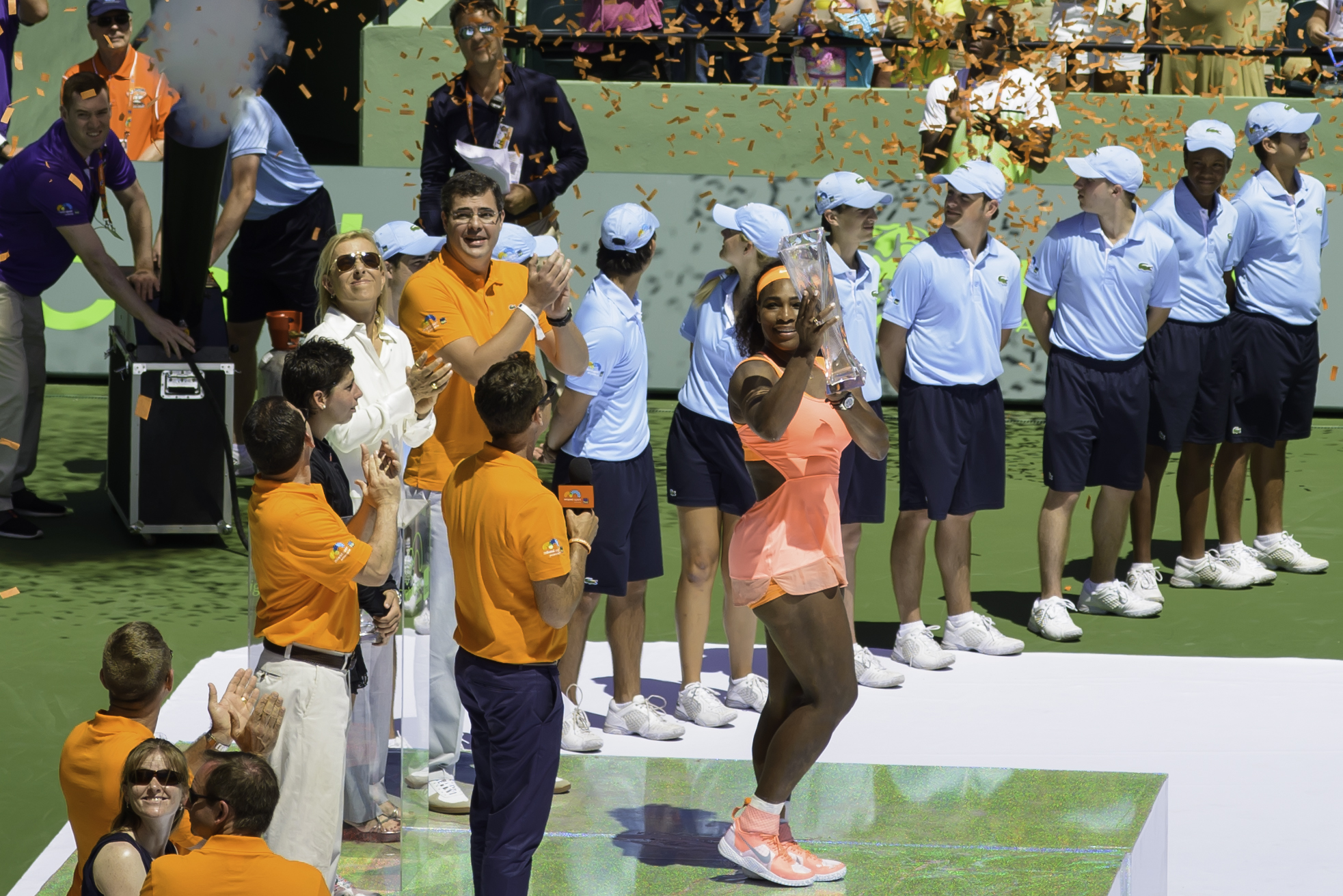
- Serena Williams finished the year as world No. 1 for the fifth time in her career. She won five tournaments during the season, including three majors at the Australian Open, the French Open, and the Wimbledon Championships (completing a non-calendar year Grand Slam). She also won two Premier Mandatory and Premier 5 events.

Details
- Duration: 4 January – 8 November 2015
- Edition: 45th
- Tournaments: 59
- Categories: Grand Slam (4); WTA Finals; WTA Elite Trophy; WTA Premier Mandatory (4); WTA Premier 5 (5); WTA Premier (12); WTA International (32)

Achievements (singles)
- Most titles: (United States) Serena Williams (5)
- Most finals: (Czech Republic) Karolína Plíšková (6)
- Prize money leader: (United States) Serena Williams (US$10,582,642)
- Points leader: (United States) Serena Williams (9,945)

Awards
- Player of the year: (United States) Serena Williams
- Doubles team of the year: (Switzerland) Martina Hingis (India) Sania Mirza
- Most improved player of the year: (Switzerland) Timea Bacsinszky
- Newcomer of the year: (Russia) Daria Gavrilova
- Comeback player of the year: (United States) Venus Williams

The 2015 WTA Tour was the elite professional tennis circuit organised by the Women's Tennis Association (WTA) for the 2015 tennis season. The 2015 WTA Tour calendar comprises the Grand Slam tournaments (supervised by the International Tennis Federation (ITF), the WTA Premier tournaments (Premier Mandatory, Premier 5, and regular Premier), the WTA International tournaments, the Fed Cup (organized by the ITF), and the year-end championships (the WTA Finals and the WTA Elite Trophy). Also included in the 2015 calendar is the Hopman Cup, which is organized by the ITF and does not distribute ranking points.

== Schedule ==
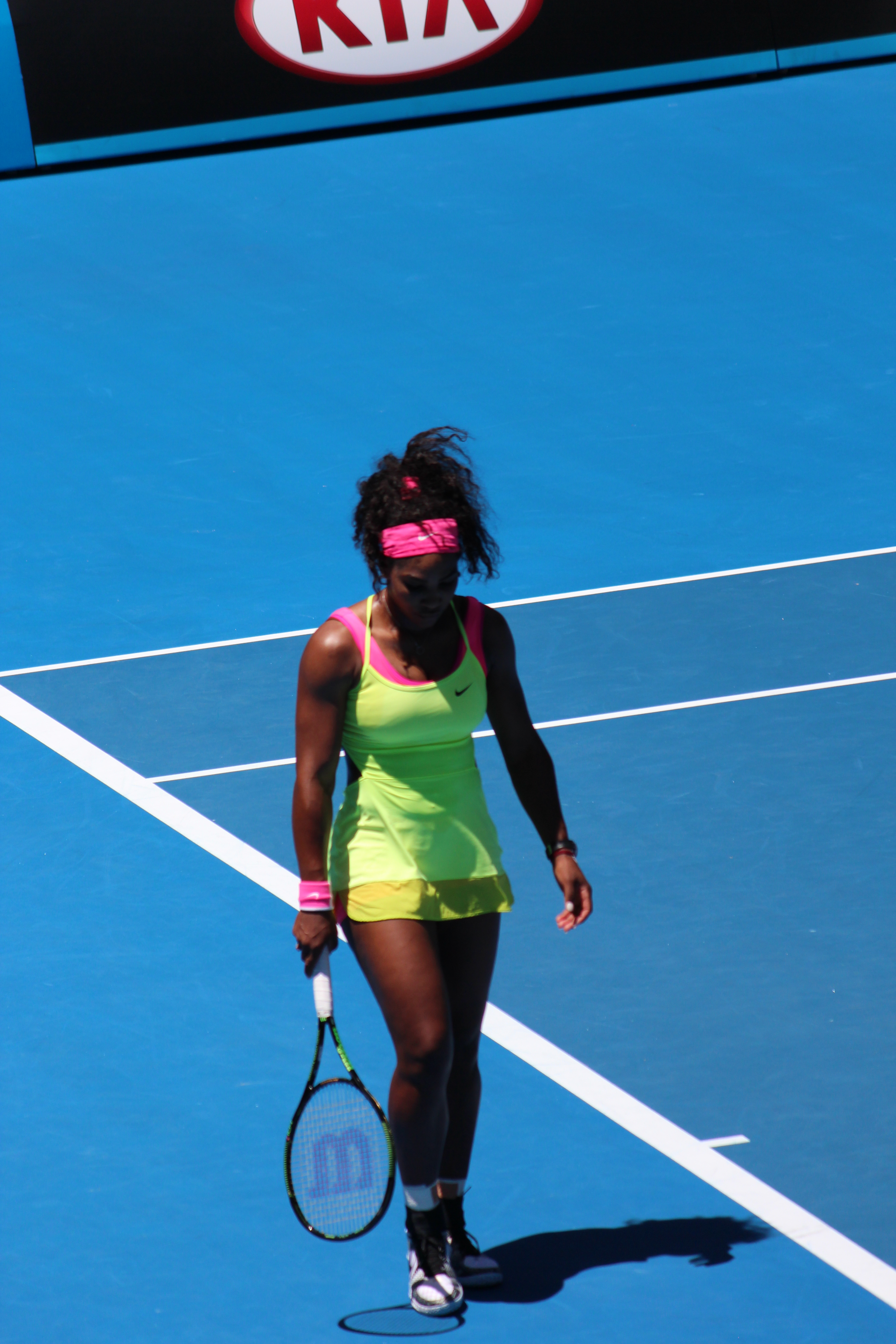
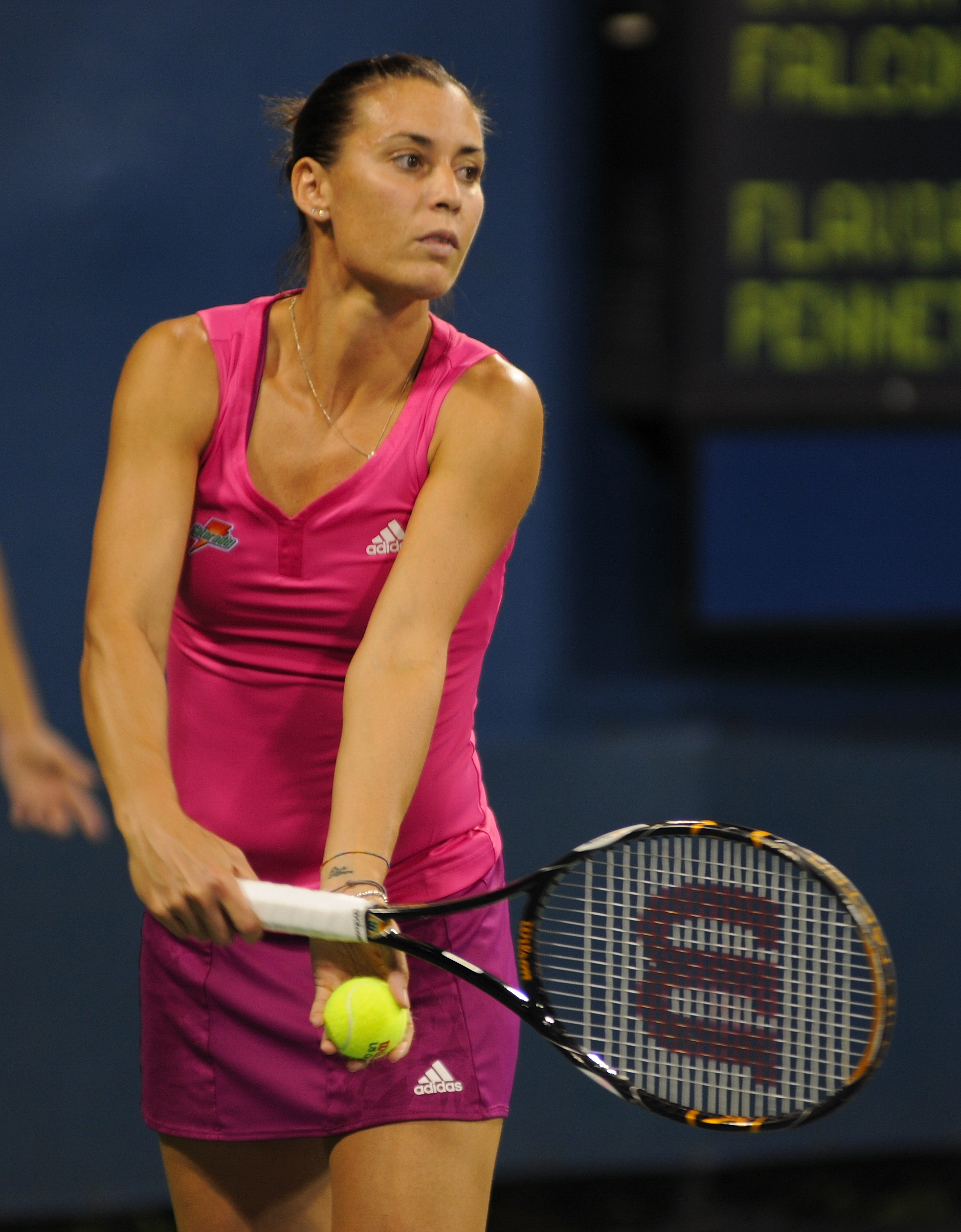
Serena Williams won the first three Majors of the year, the Australian Open, French Open, and Wimbledon, and was on course for the Grand Slam until she lost in the semifinals of the US Open to Roberta Vinci; Flavia Pennetta went on to win her maiden Major singles title by defeating Vinci in the US Open final. Pennetta then retired from professional tennis at the WTA Finals in Singapore.

This is the complete schedule of events on the 2015 calendar, with player progression documented from the quarterfinals stage.

Key

Grand Slam tournaments
Year-end championships
WTA Premier Mandatory
WTA Premier 5
WTA Premier
WTA International
Team events

=== January ===
Week	Tournament	Champions	Runners-up	Semifinalists	Quarterfinalists
5 Jan	Hopman Cup; Perth, Australia; ITF Mixed Teams Championships; Hard (i) – $1,000,000 – 8 teams (RR)	Poland; 2–1	United States	Round robin (Group A); Canada; Czech Republic; Italy	Round robin (Group B); Australia; France; Great Britain
5 Jan	Brisbane International; Brisbane, Australia; WTA Premier; Hard – $1,000,000 – 30S/16D; Singles – Doubles	(Russia) Maria Sharapova; 6–7^{(4–7)}, 6–3, 6–3	(Serbia) Ana Ivanovic	(Ukraine) Elina Svitolina (United States) Varvara Lepchenko	(Spain) Carla Suárez Navarro (Germany) Angelique Kerber (Russia) Alla Kudryavtseva (Estonia) Kaia Kanepi
5 Jan	Brisbane International; Brisbane, Australia; WTA Premier; Hard – $1,000,000 – 30S/16D; Singles – Doubles	(Switzerland) Martina Hingis (Germany) Sabine Lisicki; 6–2, 7–5	(France) Caroline Garcia (Slovenia) Katarina Srebotnik	(Ukraine) Elina Svitolina (United States) Varvara Lepchenko	(Spain) Carla Suárez Navarro (Germany) Angelique Kerber (Russia) Alla Kudryavtseva (Estonia) Kaia Kanepi
5 Jan	Shenzhen Open; Shenzhen, China; WTA International; Hard – $500,000 – 32S/16D; Singles – Doubles	(Romania) Simona Halep; 6–2, 6–2	(Switzerland) Timea Bacsinszky	(China) Zheng Saisai (Czech Republic) Petra Kvitová	(Serbia) Aleksandra Krunić (Kazakhstan) Zarina Diyas (Russia) Vera Zvonareva (Czech Republic) Tereza Smitková
5 Jan	Shenzhen Open; Shenzhen, China; WTA International; Hard – $500,000 – 32S/16D; Singles – Doubles	(Ukraine) Lyudmyla Kichenok (Ukraine) Nadiia Kichenok; 6–4, 7–6^{(8–6)}	(China) Liang Chen (China) Wang Yafan	(China) Zheng Saisai (Czech Republic) Petra Kvitová	(Serbia) Aleksandra Krunić (Kazakhstan) Zarina Diyas (Russia) Vera Zvonareva (Czech Republic) Tereza Smitková
5 Jan	Auckland Open; Auckland, New Zealand; WTA International; Hard – $250,000 – 32S/16D; Singles – Doubles	(United States) Venus Williams; 2–6, 6–3, 6–3	(Denmark) Caroline Wozniacki	(Czech Republic) Barbora Záhlavová-Strýcová (United States) Lauren Davis	(Germany) Julia Görges (United States) CoCo Vandeweghe (Russia) Elena Vesnina (Poland) Urszula Radwańska
5 Jan	Auckland Open; Auckland, New Zealand; WTA International; Hard – $250,000 – 32S/16D; Singles – Doubles	(Italy) Sara Errani (Italy) Roberta Vinci; 6–2, 6–1	(Japan) Shuko Aoyama (Czech Republic) Renata Voráčová	(Czech Republic) Barbora Záhlavová-Strýcová (United States) Lauren Davis	(Germany) Julia Görges (United States) CoCo Vandeweghe (Russia) Elena Vesnina (Poland) Urszula Radwańska
12 Jan	Sydney International; Sydney, Australia; WTA Premier; Hard – $731,000 – 30S/16D; Singles – Doubles	(Czech Republic) Petra Kvitová; 7–6^{(7–5)}, 7–6^{(8–6)}	(Czech Republic) Karolína Plíšková	(Germany) Angelique Kerber (Bulgaria) Tsvetana Pironkova	(Spain) Carla Suárez Navarro (Spain) Garbiñe Muguruza (Czech Republic) Barbora Záhlavová-Strýcová (Australia) Jarmila Gajdošová
12 Jan	Sydney International; Sydney, Australia; WTA Premier; Hard – $731,000 – 30S/16D; Singles – Doubles	(United States) Bethanie Mattek-Sands (India) Sania Mirza; 6–3, 6–3	(United States) Raquel Kops-Jones (United States) Abigail Spears	(Germany) Angelique Kerber (Bulgaria) Tsvetana Pironkova	(Spain) Carla Suárez Navarro (Spain) Garbiñe Muguruza (Czech Republic) Barbora Záhlavová-Strýcová (Australia) Jarmila Gajdošová
12 Jan	Hobart International; Hobart, Australia; WTA International; Hard – $250,000 – 32S/16D; Singles – Doubles	(United Kingdom) Heather Watson; 6–3, 6–4	(United States) Madison Brengle	(Japan) Kurumi Nara (United States) Alison Riske	(Italy) Karin Knapp (Italy) Camila Giorgi (Italy) Roberta Vinci (Kazakhstan) Zarina Diyas
12 Jan	Hobart International; Hobart, Australia; WTA International; Hard – $250,000 – 32S/16D; Singles – Doubles	(Netherlands) Kiki Bertens (Sweden) Johanna Larsson; 7–5, 6–3	(Russia) Vitalia Diatchenko (Romania) Monica Niculescu	(Japan) Kurumi Nara (United States) Alison Riske	(Italy) Karin Knapp (Italy) Camila Giorgi (Italy) Roberta Vinci (Kazakhstan) Zarina Diyas
19 Jan; 26 Jan	Australian Open; Melbourne, Australia; Grand Slam; Hard – $12,122,762; 128S/64D/32X; Singles – Doubles – Mixed doubles	(United States) Serena Williams; 6–3, 7–6^{(7–5)}	(Russia) Maria Sharapova	(United States) Madison Keys (Russia) Ekaterina Makarova	(Slovakia) Dominika Cibulková (United States) Venus Williams (Romania) Simona Halep (Canada) Eugenie Bouchard
19 Jan; 26 Jan	Australian Open; Melbourne, Australia; Grand Slam; Hard – $12,122,762; 128S/64D/32X; Singles – Doubles – Mixed doubles	(United States) Bethanie Mattek-Sands (Czech Republic) Lucie Šafářová; 6–4, 7–6^{(7–5)}	(Chinese Taipei) Chan Yung-jan (China) Zheng Jie	(United States) Madison Keys (Russia) Ekaterina Makarova	(Slovakia) Dominika Cibulková (United States) Venus Williams (Romania) Simona Halep (Canada) Eugenie Bouchard
19 Jan; 26 Jan	Australian Open; Melbourne, Australia; Grand Slam; Hard – $12,122,762; 128S/64D/32X; Singles – Doubles – Mixed doubles	(Switzerland) Martina Hingis (India) Leander Paes; 6–4, 6–3	(France) Kristina Mladenovic (Canada) Daniel Nestor	(United States) Madison Keys (Russia) Ekaterina Makarova	(Slovakia) Dominika Cibulková (United States) Venus Williams (Romania) Simona Halep (Canada) Eugenie Bouchard

=== February ===
Week	Tournament	Champions	Runners-up	Semifinalists	Quarterfinalists
2 Feb	Fed Cup Quarterfinals; Québec City, Canada – hard (i); Genoa, Italy – Clay (i); Kraków, Poland – hard (i); Stuttgart, Germany – hard (i)	Quarterfinals winners Czech Republic 4–0; France 3–2; Russia 4–0; Germany 4–1	Quarterfinals losers Canada; Italy; Poland; Australia		
9 Feb	Diamond Games; Antwerp, Belgium; WTA Premier; Hard (i) – $731,000 – 28S/16D; Singles – Doubles	(Germany) Andrea Petkovic; Walkover	(Spain) Carla Suárez Navarro	(Czech Republic) Barbora Záhlavová-Strýcová (Czech Republic) Karolína Plíšková	(Germany) Mona Barthel (Slovakia) Dominika Cibulková (Czech Republic) Lucie Šafářová (Italy) Francesca Schiavone
9 Feb	Diamond Games; Antwerp, Belgium; WTA Premier; Hard (i) – $731,000 – 28S/16D; Singles – Doubles	(Spain) Anabel Medina Garrigues (Spain) Arantxa Parra Santonja; 6–4, 3–6, [10–5]	(Belgium) An-Sophie Mestach (Belgium) Alison Van Uytvanck	(Czech Republic) Barbora Záhlavová-Strýcová (Czech Republic) Karolína Plíšková	(Germany) Mona Barthel (Slovakia) Dominika Cibulková (Czech Republic) Lucie Šafářová (Italy) Francesca Schiavone
9 Feb	Thailand Open; Pattaya, Thailand; WTA International; Hard – $250,000 – 32S/16D; Singles – Doubles	(Slovakia) Daniela Hantuchová; 3–6, 6–3, 6–4	(Croatia) Ajla Tomljanović	(Puerto Rico) Monica Puig (New Zealand) Marina Erakovic	(Japan) Misaki Doi (Russia) Evgeniya Rodina (China) Duan Yingying (Russia) Vera Zvonareva
9 Feb	Thailand Open; Pattaya, Thailand; WTA International; Hard – $250,000 – 32S/16D; Singles – Doubles	(Chinese Taipei) Chan Hao-ching (Chinese Taipei) Chan Yung-jan; 2–6, 6–4, [10–3]	(Japan) Shuko Aoyama (Thailand) Tamarine Tanasugarn	(Puerto Rico) Monica Puig (New Zealand) Marina Erakovic	(Japan) Misaki Doi (Russia) Evgeniya Rodina (China) Duan Yingying (Russia) Vera Zvonareva
16 Feb	Dubai Tennis Championships; Dubai, United Arab Emirates; WTA Premier 5 Hard – $2,513,000 – 54S/28D; Singles – Doubles	(Romania) Simona Halep; 6–4, 7–6^{(7–4)}	(Czech Republic) Karolína Plíšková	(Denmark) Caroline Wozniacki (Spain) Garbiñe Muguruza	(Russia) Ekaterina Makarova (Italy) Flavia Pennetta (Czech Republic) Lucie Šafářová (Spain) Carla Suárez Navarro
16 Feb	Dubai Tennis Championships; Dubai, United Arab Emirates; WTA Premier 5 Hard – $2,513,000 – 54S/28D; Singles – Doubles	(Hungary) Tímea Babos (France) Kristina Mladenovic; 6–3, 6–2	(Spain) Garbiñe Muguruza (Spain) Carla Suárez Navarro	(Denmark) Caroline Wozniacki (Spain) Garbiñe Muguruza	(Russia) Ekaterina Makarova (Italy) Flavia Pennetta (Czech Republic) Lucie Šafářová (Spain) Carla Suárez Navarro
16 Feb	Rio Open; Rio de Janeiro, Brazil; WTA International; Clay (red) – $250,000 – 32S/24Q/16D; Singles – Doubles	(Italy) Sara Errani; 7–6^{(7–2)}, 6–1	(Slovakia) Anna Schmiedlová	(Sweden) Johanna Larsson (Romania) Irina-Camelia Begu	(Brazil) Beatriz Haddad Maia (Germany) Dinah Pfizenmaier (Paraguay) Verónica Cepede Royg (Israel) Julia Glushko
16 Feb	Rio Open; Rio de Janeiro, Brazil; WTA International; Clay (red) – $250,000 – 32S/24Q/16D; Singles – Doubles	(Belgium) Ysaline Bonaventure (Sweden) Rebecca Peterson; 3–0, retired	(Romania) Irina-Camelia Begu (Argentina) María Irigoyen	(Sweden) Johanna Larsson (Romania) Irina-Camelia Begu	(Brazil) Beatriz Haddad Maia (Germany) Dinah Pfizenmaier (Paraguay) Verónica Cepede Royg (Israel) Julia Glushko
23 Feb	Qatar Open; Doha, Qatar; WTA Premier $731,000 – hard – 28S/16D; Singles – Doubles	(Czech Republic) Lucie Šafářová; 6–4, 6–3	(Belarus) Victoria Azarenka	(Spain) Carla Suárez Navarro (United States) Venus Williams	(Czech Republic) Petra Kvitová (Germany) Andrea Petkovic (Poland) Agnieszka Radwańska (Denmark) Caroline Wozniacki
23 Feb	Qatar Open; Doha, Qatar; WTA Premier $731,000 – hard – 28S/16D; Singles – Doubles	(United States) Raquel Kops-Jones (United States) Abigail Spears; 6–4, 6–4	(Chinese Taipei) Hsieh Su-wei (India) Sania Mirza	(Spain) Carla Suárez Navarro (United States) Venus Williams	(Czech Republic) Petra Kvitová (Germany) Andrea Petkovic (Poland) Agnieszka Radwańska (Denmark) Caroline Wozniacki
23 Feb	Mexican Open; Acapulco, Mexico; WTA International; Hard – $250,000 – 32S/16D; Singles – Doubles	(Switzerland) Timea Bacsinszky; 6–3, 6–0	(France) Caroline Garcia	(Russia) Maria Sharapova (Bulgaria) Sesil Karatantcheva	(Slovakia) Magdaléna Rybáriková (Croatia) Mirjana Lučić-Baroni (Sweden) Johanna Larsson (Puerto Rico) Monica Puig
23 Feb	Mexican Open; Acapulco, Mexico; WTA International; Hard – $250,000 – 32S/16D; Singles – Doubles	(Spain) Lara Arruabarrena (Spain) María Teresa Torró Flor; 7–6^{(7–2)}, 5–7, [13–11]	(Czech Republic) Andrea Hlaváčková (Czech Republic) Lucie Hradecká	(Russia) Maria Sharapova (Bulgaria) Sesil Karatantcheva	(Slovakia) Magdaléna Rybáriková (Croatia) Mirjana Lučić-Baroni (Sweden) Johanna Larsson (Puerto Rico) Monica Puig

=== March ===
Week	Tournament	Champions	Runners-up	Semifinalists	Quarterfinalists
2 Mar	Monterrey Open; Monterrey, Mexico; WTA International $500,000 – hard – 32S/16D; Singles – Doubles	(Switzerland) Timea Bacsinszky; 4–6, 6–2, 6–4	(France) Caroline Garcia	(Serbia) Ana Ivanovic (Italy) Sara Errani	(France) Kristina Mladenovic (Slovakia) Magdaléna Rybáriková (Poland) Urszula Radwańska (Russia) Anastasia Pavlyuchenkova
2 Mar	Monterrey Open; Monterrey, Mexico; WTA International $500,000 – hard – 32S/16D; Singles – Doubles	(Canada) Gabriela Dabrowski (Poland) Alicja Rosolska; 6–3, 2–6, [10–3]	(Australia) Anastasia Rodionova (Australia) Arina Rodionova	(Serbia) Ana Ivanovic (Italy) Sara Errani	(France) Kristina Mladenovic (Slovakia) Magdaléna Rybáriková (Poland) Urszula Radwańska (Russia) Anastasia Pavlyuchenkova
2 Mar	Malaysian Open; Kuala Lumpur, Malaysia; WTA International; Hard – $250,000 – 32S/24Q/16D; Singles – Doubles	(Denmark) Caroline Wozniacki; 4–6, 6–2, 6–1	(Romania) Alexandra Dulgheru	(Chinese Taipei) Hsieh Su-wei (Australia) Jarmila Gajdošová	(Germany) Carina Witthöft (Russia) Elizaveta Kulichkova (Japan) Kurumi Nara (Germany) Julia Görges
2 Mar	Malaysian Open; Kuala Lumpur, Malaysia; WTA International; Hard – $250,000 – 32S/24Q/16D; Singles – Doubles	(China) Liang Chen (China) Wang Yafan; 4–6, 6–3, [10–4]	(Ukraine) Yuliya Beygelzimer (Ukraine) Olga Savchuk	(Chinese Taipei) Hsieh Su-wei (Australia) Jarmila Gajdošová	(Germany) Carina Witthöft (Russia) Elizaveta Kulichkova (Japan) Kurumi Nara (Germany) Julia Görges
9 Mar; 16 Mar	Indian Wells Open; Indian Wells, United States; WTA Premier Mandatory $6,157,160 – hard – 96S/48Q/32D; Singles – Doubles	(Romania) Simona Halep; 2–6, 7–5, 6–4	(Serbia) Jelena Janković	(United States) Serena Williams (Germany) Sabine Lisicki	(Switzerland) Timea Bacsinszky (Spain) Carla Suárez Navarro (Ukraine) Lesia Tsurenko (Italy) Flavia Pennetta
9 Mar; 16 Mar	Indian Wells Open; Indian Wells, United States; WTA Premier Mandatory $6,157,160 – hard – 96S/48Q/32D; Singles – Doubles	(Switzerland) Martina Hingis (India) Sania Mirza; 6–3, 6–4	(Russia) Ekaterina Makarova (Russia) Elena Vesnina	(United States) Serena Williams (Germany) Sabine Lisicki	(Switzerland) Timea Bacsinszky (Spain) Carla Suárez Navarro (Ukraine) Lesia Tsurenko (Italy) Flavia Pennetta
23 Mar; 30 Mar	Miami Open; Key Biscayne, United States; WTA Premier Mandatory $6,157,160 – hard – 96S/48Q/32D; Singles – Doubles	(United States) Serena Williams; 6–2, 6–0	(Spain) Carla Suárez Navarro	(Romania) Simona Halep (Germany) Andrea Petkovic	(Germany) Sabine Lisicki (United States) Sloane Stephens (United States) Venus Williams (Czech Republic) Karolína Plíšková
23 Mar; 30 Mar	Miami Open; Key Biscayne, United States; WTA Premier Mandatory $6,157,160 – hard – 96S/48Q/32D; Singles – Doubles	(Switzerland) Martina Hingis (India) Sania Mirza; 7–5, 6–1	(Russia) Ekaterina Makarova (Russia) Elena Vesnina	(Romania) Simona Halep (Germany) Andrea Petkovic	(Germany) Sabine Lisicki (United States) Sloane Stephens (United States) Venus Williams (Czech Republic) Karolína Plíšková

=== April ===
Week	Tournament	Champions	Runners-up	Semifinalists	Quarterfinalists
6 Apr	Charleston Open; Charleston, United States; WTA Premier; Clay – $731,000 (Green) – 56S/16D; Singles – Doubles	(Germany) Angelique Kerber; 6–2, 4–6, 7–5	(United States) Madison Keys	(Czech Republic) Lucie Hradecká (Germany) Andrea Petkovic	(United States) Lauren Davis (Italy) Sara Errani (Montenegro) Danka Kovinić (Romania) Irina-Camelia Begu
6 Apr	Charleston Open; Charleston, United States; WTA Premier; Clay – $731,000 (Green) – 56S/16D; Singles – Doubles	(Switzerland) Martina Hingis (India) Sania Mirza; 6–0, 6–4	(Australia) Casey Dellacqua (Croatia) Darija Jurak	(Czech Republic) Lucie Hradecká (Germany) Andrea Petkovic	(United States) Lauren Davis (Italy) Sara Errani (Montenegro) Danka Kovinić (Romania) Irina-Camelia Begu
6 Apr	Katowice Open; Katowice, Poland; WTA International; Hard (i) – $250,000 – 32S/16D; Singles – Doubles	(Slovakia) Anna Karolína Schmiedlová; 6–4, 6–3	(Italy) Camila Giorgi	(Poland) Agnieszka Radwańska (Belgium) Alison Van Uytvanck	(Czech Republic) Klára Koukalová (Russia) Elizaveta Kulichkova (Belgium) Kirsten Flipkens (France) Alizé Cornet
6 Apr	Katowice Open; Katowice, Poland; WTA International; Hard (i) – $250,000 – 32S/16D; Singles – Doubles	(Belgium) Ysaline Bonaventure (Netherlands) Demi Schuurs; 7–5, 4–6, [10–6]	(Italy) Gioia Barbieri (Italy) Karin Knapp	(Poland) Agnieszka Radwańska (Belgium) Alison Van Uytvanck	(Czech Republic) Klára Koukalová (Russia) Elizaveta Kulichkova (Belgium) Kirsten Flipkens (France) Alizé Cornet
13 Apr	Fed Cup Semifinals; Ostrava, Czech Republic – hard (i); Sochi, Russia – Clay (i)	Semifinals winners Czech Republic 3–1; Russia 3–2	Semifinals losers France; Germany		
13 Apr	Copa Colsanitas; Bogotá, Colombia; WTA International; Clay (red) – $250,000 – 32S/24Q/16D; Singles – Doubles	(Brazil) Teliana Pereira; 7–6^{(7–2)}, 6–1	(Kazakhstan) Yaroslava Shvedova	(Ukraine) Elina Svitolina (Colombia) Mariana Duque Mariño	(United States) Irina Falconi (Spain) Lourdes Domínguez Lino (Israel) Julia Glushko (Puerto Rico) Monica Puig
13 Apr	Copa Colsanitas; Bogotá, Colombia; WTA International; Clay (red) – $250,000 – 32S/24Q/16D; Singles – Doubles	(Brazil) Paula Cristina Gonçalves (Brazil) Beatriz Haddad Maia; 6–3, 3–6, [10–6]	(United States) Irina Falconi (United States) Shelby Rogers	(Ukraine) Elina Svitolina (Colombia) Mariana Duque Mariño	(United States) Irina Falconi (Spain) Lourdes Domínguez Lino (Israel) Julia Glushko (Puerto Rico) Monica Puig
20 Apr	Stuttgart Open; Stuttgart, Germany; WTA Premier; Clay (red) (i) – $731,000 – 28S/16D; Singles – Doubles	(Germany) Angelique Kerber; 3–6, 6–1, 7–5	(Denmark) Caroline Wozniacki	(United States) Madison Brengle (Romania) Simona Halep	(Russia) Ekaterina Makarova (France) Caroline Garcia (Spain) Carla Suárez Navarro (Italy) Sara Errani
20 Apr	Stuttgart Open; Stuttgart, Germany; WTA Premier; Clay (red) (i) – $731,000 – 28S/16D; Singles – Doubles	(United States) Bethanie Mattek-Sands (Czech Republic) Lucie Šafářová; 6–4, 6–3	(France) Caroline Garcia (Slovenia) Katarina Srebotnik	(United States) Madison Brengle (Romania) Simona Halep	(Russia) Ekaterina Makarova (France) Caroline Garcia (Spain) Carla Suárez Navarro (Italy) Sara Errani
27 Apr	Morocco Open; Marrakesh, Morocco; WTA International; Clay (red) – $250,000 – 32S/16D; Singles – Doubles	(Ukraine) Elina Svitolina; 7–5, 7–6^{(7–3)}	(Hungary) Tímea Babos	(France) Kristina Mladenovic (Slovakia) Anna Karolína Schmiedlová	(Spain) Lara Arruabarrena (Italy) Flavia Pennetta (Italy) Karin Knapp (Switzerland) Timea Bacsinszky
27 Apr	Morocco Open; Marrakesh, Morocco; WTA International; Clay (red) – $250,000 – 32S/16D; Singles – Doubles	(Hungary) Tímea Babos (France) Kristina Mladenovic; 6–1, 7–6^{(7–5)}	(Germany) Laura Siegemund (Ukraine) Maryna Zanevska	(France) Kristina Mladenovic (Slovakia) Anna Karolína Schmiedlová	(Spain) Lara Arruabarrena (Italy) Flavia Pennetta (Italy) Karin Knapp (Switzerland) Timea Bacsinszky
27 Apr	Prague Open; Prague, Czech Republic; WTA International; Clay (red) – $250,000 – 32S/16D; Singles – Doubles	(Czech Republic) Karolína Plíšková; 4–6, 7–5, 6–3	(Czech Republic) Lucie Hradecká	(Belgium) Yanina Wickmayer (Czech Republic) Kateřina Siniaková	(Czech Republic) Denisa Allertová (Montenegro) Danka Kovinić (Czech Republic) Barbora Strýcová (Czech Republic) Klára Koukalová
27 Apr	Prague Open; Prague, Czech Republic; WTA International; Clay (red) – $250,000 – 32S/16D; Singles – Doubles	(Switzerland) Belinda Bencic (Czech Republic) Kateřina Siniaková; 6–2, 6–2	(Ukraine) Kateryna Bondarenko (Czech Republic) Eva Hrdinová	(Belgium) Yanina Wickmayer (Czech Republic) Kateřina Siniaková	(Czech Republic) Denisa Allertová (Montenegro) Danka Kovinić (Czech Republic) Barbora Strýcová (Czech Republic) Klára Koukalová

=== May ===
Week	Tournament	Champions	Runners-up	Semifinalists	Quarterfinalists
4 May	Madrid Open; Madrid, Spain; WTA Premier Mandatory; Clay (red) – €4,185,405 – 64S/28D; Singles – Doubles	(Czech Republic) Petra Kvitová; 6–1, 6–2	(Russia) Svetlana Kuznetsova	(United States) Serena Williams (Russia) Maria Sharapova	(Spain) Carla Suárez Navarro (Romania) Irina-Camelia Begu (Denmark) Caroline Wozniacki (Czech Republic) Lucie Šafářová
4 May	Madrid Open; Madrid, Spain; WTA Premier Mandatory; Clay (red) – €4,185,405 – 64S/28D; Singles – Doubles	(Australia) Casey Dellacqua (Kazakhstan) Yaroslava Shvedova; 6–3, 6–7^{(4–7)}, [10–5]	(Spain) Garbiñe Muguruza (Spain) Carla Suárez Navarro	(United States) Serena Williams (Russia) Maria Sharapova	(Spain) Carla Suárez Navarro (Romania) Irina-Camelia Begu (Denmark) Caroline Wozniacki (Czech Republic) Lucie Šafářová
11 May	Italian Open; Rome, Italy; WTA Premier 5 Clay (red) – $2,183,600 – 56S/28D; Singles – Doubles	(Russia) Maria Sharapova; 4–6, 7–5, 6–1	(Spain) Carla Suárez Navarro	(Russia) Daria Gavrilova (Romania) Simona Halep	(United States) Christina McHale (Belarus) Victoria Azarenka (Czech Republic) Petra Kvitová (Romania) Alexandra Dulgheru
11 May	Italian Open; Rome, Italy; WTA Premier 5 Clay (red) – $2,183,600 – 56S/28D; Singles – Doubles	(Hungary) Tímea Babos (France) Kristina Mladenovic; 6–4, 6–3	(Switzerland) Martina Hingis (India) Sania Mirza	(Russia) Daria Gavrilova (Romania) Simona Halep	(United States) Christina McHale (Belarus) Victoria Azarenka (Czech Republic) Petra Kvitová (Romania) Alexandra Dulgheru
18 May	Internationaux de Strasbourg; Strasbourg, France; WTA International; Clay (red) – $250,000 – 32S/24Q/16D; Singles – Doubles	(Australia) Samantha Stosur; 3–6, 6–2, 6–3	(France) Kristina Mladenovic	(France) Virginie Razzano (United States) Sloane Stephens	(United States) Madison Keys (Russia) Elena Vesnina (Croatia) Ajla Tomljanović (Serbia) Jelena Janković
18 May	Internationaux de Strasbourg; Strasbourg, France; WTA International; Clay (red) – $250,000 – 32S/24Q/16D; Singles – Doubles	(Chinese Taipei) Chuang Chia-jung (China) Liang Chen; 4–6, 6–4, [12–10]	(Ukraine) Nadiia Kichenok (China) Zheng Saisai	(France) Virginie Razzano (United States) Sloane Stephens	(United States) Madison Keys (Russia) Elena Vesnina (Croatia) Ajla Tomljanović (Serbia) Jelena Janković
18 May	Nuremberg Cup; Nürnberg, Germany; WTA International; Clay (red) – $250,000 – 32S/24Q/16D; Singles – Doubles	(Italy) Karin Knapp; 7–6^{(7–5)}, 4–6, 6–1	(Italy) Roberta Vinci	(Spain) Lara Arruabarrena (Germany) Angelique Kerber	(Kazakhstan) Yulia Putintseva (Germany) Carina Witthöft (Japan) Kurumi Nara (Japan) Misaki Doi
18 May	Nuremberg Cup; Nürnberg, Germany; WTA International; Clay (red) – $250,000 – 32S/24Q/16D; Singles – Doubles	(Chinese Taipei) Chan Hao-ching (Spain) Anabel Medina Garrigues; 6–2, 7–6^{(7–5)}	(Spain) Lara Arruabarrena (Romania) Raluca Olaru	(Spain) Lara Arruabarrena (Germany) Angelique Kerber	(Kazakhstan) Yulia Putintseva (Germany) Carina Witthöft (Japan) Kurumi Nara (Japan) Misaki Doi
25 May; 1 Jun	French Open; Paris, France; Grand Slam; Clay (red) – $11,315,740; 128S/64D/32X; Singles – Doubles – Mixed doubles	(United States) Serena Williams; 6–3, 6–7^{(2–7)}, 6–2	(Czech Republic) Lucie Šafářová	(Switzerland) Timea Bacsinszky (Serbia) Ana Ivanovic	(Italy) Sara Errani (Belgium) Alison Van Uytvanck (Ukraine) Elina Svitolina (Spain) Garbiñe Muguruza
25 May; 1 Jun	French Open; Paris, France; Grand Slam; Clay (red) – $11,315,740; 128S/64D/32X; Singles – Doubles – Mixed doubles	(United States) Bethanie Mattek-Sands (Czech Republic) Lucie Šafářová; 3–6, 6–4, 6–2	(Australia) Casey Dellacqua (Kazakhstan) Yaroslava Shvedova	(Switzerland) Timea Bacsinszky (Serbia) Ana Ivanovic	(Italy) Sara Errani (Belgium) Alison Van Uytvanck (Ukraine) Elina Svitolina (Spain) Garbiñe Muguruza
25 May; 1 Jun	French Open; Paris, France; Grand Slam; Clay (red) – $11,315,740; 128S/64D/32X; Singles – Doubles – Mixed doubles	(United States) Bethanie Mattek-Sands (United States) Mike Bryan; 7–6^{(7–3)}, 6–1	(Czech Republic) Lucie Hradecká (Poland) Marcin Matkowski	(Switzerland) Timea Bacsinszky (Serbia) Ana Ivanovic	(Italy) Sara Errani (Belgium) Alison Van Uytvanck (Ukraine) Elina Svitolina (Spain) Garbiñe Muguruza

=== June ===
Week	Tournament	Champions	Runners-up	Semifinalists	Quarterfinalists
8 Jun	Nottingham Open; Nottingham, Great Britain; WTA International; Grass – $250,000 – 32S/16D; Singles – Doubles	(Croatia) Ana Konjuh; 1–6, 6–4, 6–2	(Romania) Monica Niculescu	(Poland) Agnieszka Radwańska (United States) Alison Riske	(United States) Lauren Davis (United Kingdom) Johanna Konta (Belgium) Yanina Wickmayer (United States) Sachia Vickery
8 Jun	Nottingham Open; Nottingham, Great Britain; WTA International; Grass – $250,000 – 32S/16D; Singles – Doubles	(United States) Raquel Kops-Jones (United States) Abigail Spears; 3–6, 6–3, [11–9]	(United Kingdom) Jocelyn Rae (United Kingdom) Anna Smith	(Poland) Agnieszka Radwańska (United States) Alison Riske	(United States) Lauren Davis (United Kingdom) Johanna Konta (Belgium) Yanina Wickmayer (United States) Sachia Vickery
8 Jun	Rosmalen Grass Court Championships; Rosmalen, Netherlands; WTA International; Grass – $250,000 – 32S/16D; Singles – Doubles	(Italy) Camila Giorgi; 7–5, 6–3	(Switzerland) Belinda Bencic	(Netherlands) Kiki Bertens (Serbia) Jelena Janković	(Kazakhstan) Yaroslava Shvedova (United States) CoCo Vandeweghe (France) Kristina Mladenovic (Germany) Annika Beck
8 Jun	Rosmalen Grass Court Championships; Rosmalen, Netherlands; WTA International; Grass – $250,000 – 32S/16D; Singles – Doubles	(United States) Asia Muhammad (Germany) Laura Siegemund; 6–3, 7–5	(Serbia) Jelena Janković (Russia) Anastasia Pavlyuchenkova	(Netherlands) Kiki Bertens (Serbia) Jelena Janković	(Kazakhstan) Yaroslava Shvedova (United States) CoCo Vandeweghe (France) Kristina Mladenovic (Germany) Annika Beck
15 Jun	Birmingham Classic; Birmingham, Great Britain; WTA Premier; Grass – $731,000 – 56S/16D; Singles – Doubles	(Germany) Angelique Kerber; 6–7^{(5–7)}, 6–3, 7–6^{(7–4)}	(Czech Republic) Karolína Plíšková	(France) Kristina Mladenovic (Germany) Sabine Lisicki	(Romania) Simona Halep (Spain) Carla Suárez Navarro (Czech Republic) Kateřina Siniaková (Slovakia) Daniela Hantuchová
15 Jun	Birmingham Classic; Birmingham, Great Britain; WTA Premier; Grass – $731,000 – 56S/16D; Singles – Doubles	(Spain) Garbiñe Muguruza (Spain) Carla Suárez Navarro; 6–4, 6–4	(Czech Republic) Andrea Hlaváčková (Czech Republic) Lucie Hradecká	(France) Kristina Mladenovic (Germany) Sabine Lisicki	(Romania) Simona Halep (Spain) Carla Suárez Navarro (Czech Republic) Kateřina Siniaková (Slovakia) Daniela Hantuchová
22 Jun	Eastbourne International; Eastbourne, Great Britain; WTA Premier; Grass – $731,000 – 48S/16D; Singles – Doubles	(Switzerland) Belinda Bencic; 6–4, 4–6, 6–0	(Poland) Agnieszka Radwańska	(United States) Sloane Stephens (Denmark) Caroline Wozniacki	(Russia) Daria Gavrilova (Bulgaria) Tsvetana Pironkova (United Kingdom) Johanna Konta (Germany) Andrea Petkovic
22 Jun	Eastbourne International; Eastbourne, Great Britain; WTA Premier; Grass – $731,000 – 48S/16D; Singles – Doubles	(France) Caroline Garcia (Slovenia) Katarina Srebotnik; 7–6^{(7–5)}, 6–2	(Chinese Taipei) Chan Yung-jan (China) Zheng Jie	(United States) Sloane Stephens (Denmark) Caroline Wozniacki	(Russia) Daria Gavrilova (Bulgaria) Tsvetana Pironkova (United Kingdom) Johanna Konta (Germany) Andrea Petkovic
29 Jun; 6 Jul	The Championships, Wimbledon; London, Great Britain; Grand Slam; Grass – $11,174,883; 128S/64D/48X; Singles – Doubles – Mixed doubles	(United States) Serena Williams; 6–4, 6–4	(Spain) Garbiñe Muguruza	(Russia) Maria Sharapova (Poland) Agnieszka Radwańska	(Belarus) Victoria Azarenka (United States) CoCo Vandeweghe (Switzerland) Timea Bacsinszky (United States) Madison Keys
29 Jun; 6 Jul	The Championships, Wimbledon; London, Great Britain; Grand Slam; Grass – $11,174,883; 128S/64D/48X; Singles – Doubles – Mixed doubles	(Switzerland) Martina Hingis (India) Sania Mirza; 5–7, 7–6^{(7–4)}, 7–5	(Russia) Ekaterina Makarova (Russia) Elena Vesnina	(Russia) Maria Sharapova (Poland) Agnieszka Radwańska	(Belarus) Victoria Azarenka (United States) CoCo Vandeweghe (Switzerland) Timea Bacsinszky (United States) Madison Keys
29 Jun; 6 Jul	The Championships, Wimbledon; London, Great Britain; Grand Slam; Grass – $11,174,883; 128S/64D/48X; Singles – Doubles – Mixed doubles	(Switzerland) Martina Hingis (India) Leander Paes; 6–1, 6–1	(Hungary) Tímea Babos (Austria) Alexander Peya	(Russia) Maria Sharapova (Poland) Agnieszka Radwańska	(Belarus) Victoria Azarenka (United States) CoCo Vandeweghe (Switzerland) Timea Bacsinszky (United States) Madison Keys

=== July ===
Week	Tournament	Champions	Runners-up	Semifinalists	Quarterfinalists
13 Jul	Bucharest Open; Bucharest, Romania; WTA International; Clay (red) – $250,000 – 32S/16D; Singles – Doubles	(Slovakia) Anna Karolína Schmiedlová; 7–6^{(7–3)}, 6–3	(Italy) Sara Errani	(Romania) Monica Niculescu (Slovenia) Polona Hercog	(United States) Anna Tatishvili (Romania) Andreea Mitu (Montenegro) Danka Kovinić (Serbia) Aleksandra Krunić
13 Jul	Bucharest Open; Bucharest, Romania; WTA International; Clay (red) – $250,000 – 32S/16D; Singles – Doubles	(Georgia (country)) Oksana Kalashnikova (Netherlands) Demi Schuurs; 6–2, 6–2	(Romania) Andreea Mitu (Romania) Patricia Maria Țig	(Romania) Monica Niculescu (Slovenia) Polona Hercog	(United States) Anna Tatishvili (Romania) Andreea Mitu (Montenegro) Danka Kovinić (Serbia) Aleksandra Krunić
13 Jul	Swedish Open; Båstad, Sweden; WTA International; Clay (red) – $250,000 – 32S/24Q/16D; Singles – Doubles	(Sweden) Johanna Larsson; 6–3, 7–6^{(7–2)}	(Germany) Mona Barthel	(Kazakhstan) Yulia Putintseva (Spain) Lara Arruabarrena	(Czech Republic) Klára Koukalová (Czech Republic) Barbora Strýcová (Sweden) Rebecca Peterson (Slovakia) Jana Čepelová
13 Jul	Swedish Open; Båstad, Sweden; WTA International; Clay (red) – $250,000 – 32S/24Q/16D; Singles – Doubles	(Netherlands) Kiki Bertens (Sweden) Johanna Larsson; 7–5, 6–4	(Germany) Tatjana Maria (Ukraine) Olga Savchuk	(Kazakhstan) Yulia Putintseva (Spain) Lara Arruabarrena	(Czech Republic) Klára Koukalová (Czech Republic) Barbora Strýcová (Sweden) Rebecca Peterson (Slovakia) Jana Čepelová
20 Jul	İstanbul Cup; Istanbul, Turkey; WTA International; Hard – $250,000 – 32S/24Q/16D; Singles – Doubles	(Ukraine) Lesia Tsurenko; 7–5, 6–1	(Poland) Urszula Radwańska	(Belgium) Kirsten Flipkens (Slovakia) Magdaléna Rybáriková	(Ukraine) Kateryna Bondarenko (Italy) Francesca Schiavone (Bulgaria) Tsvetana Pironkova (Italy) Roberta Vinci
20 Jul	İstanbul Cup; Istanbul, Turkey; WTA International; Hard – $250,000 – 32S/24Q/16D; Singles – Doubles	(Russia) Daria Gavrilova (Ukraine) Elina Svitolina; 5–7, 6–1, [10–4]	(Turkey) Çağla Büyükakçay (Serbia) Jelena Janković	(Belgium) Kirsten Flipkens (Slovakia) Magdaléna Rybáriková	(Ukraine) Kateryna Bondarenko (Italy) Francesca Schiavone (Bulgaria) Tsvetana Pironkova (Italy) Roberta Vinci
20 Jul	Gastein Ladies; Bad Gastein, Austria; WTA International; Clay (red) – $250,000 – 32S/24Q/16D; Singles – Doubles	(Australia) Samantha Stosur; 3–6, 7–6^{(7–3)}, 6–2	(Italy) Karin Knapp	(Italy) Sara Errani (Slovakia) Anna Karolína Schmiedlová	(Russia) Daria Kasatkina (Slovenia) Polona Hercog (Germany) Annika Beck (Montenegro) Danka Kovinić
20 Jul	Gastein Ladies; Bad Gastein, Austria; WTA International; Clay (red) – $250,000 – 32S/24Q/16D; Singles – Doubles	(Montenegro) Danka Kovinić (Liechtenstein) Stephanie Vogt; 4–6, 6–4, [10–3]	(Spain) Lara Arruabarrena (Czech Republic) Lucie Hradecká	(Italy) Sara Errani (Slovakia) Anna Karolína Schmiedlová	(Russia) Daria Kasatkina (Slovenia) Polona Hercog (Germany) Annika Beck (Montenegro) Danka Kovinić
27 Jul	Baku Cup; Baku, Azerbaijan; WTA International; Hard – $250,000 – 32S/24Q/16D; Singles – Doubles	(Russia) Margarita Gasparyan; 6–3, 5–7, 6–0	(Romania) Patricia Maria Țig	(Russia) Anastasia Pavlyuchenkova (Italy) Karin Knapp	(Belgium) Kirsten Flipkens (Croatia) Donna Vekić (Russia) Evgeniya Rodina (Russia) Alexandra Panova
27 Jul	Baku Cup; Baku, Azerbaijan; WTA International; Hard – $250,000 – 32S/24Q/16D; Singles – Doubles	(Russia) Margarita Gasparyan (Russia) Alexandra Panova; 6–3, 7–5	(Russia) Vitalia Diatchenko (Ukraine) Olga Savchuk	(Russia) Anastasia Pavlyuchenkova (Italy) Karin Knapp	(Belgium) Kirsten Flipkens (Croatia) Donna Vekić (Russia) Evgeniya Rodina (Russia) Alexandra Panova
27 Jul	Brasil Tennis Cup; Florianópolis, Brazil; WTA International; Clay – $250,000 – 32S/24Q/16D; Singles – Doubles	(Brazil) Teliana Pereira; 6–4, 4–6, 6–1	(Germany) Annika Beck	(Latvia) Anastasija Sevastova (United States) Bethanie Mattek-Sands	(Spain) María Teresa Torró Flor (Germany) Laura Siegemund (Brazil) Gabriela Cé (Czech Republic) Tereza Martincová
27 Jul	Brasil Tennis Cup; Florianópolis, Brazil; WTA International; Clay – $250,000 – 32S/24Q/16D; Singles – Doubles	(Germany) Annika Beck (Germany) Laura Siegemund; 6–3, 7–6^{(7–1)}	(Argentina) María Irigoyen (Poland) Paula Kania	(Latvia) Anastasija Sevastova (United States) Bethanie Mattek-Sands	(Spain) María Teresa Torró Flor (Germany) Laura Siegemund (Brazil) Gabriela Cé (Czech Republic) Tereza Martincová

=== August ===
Week	Tournament	Champions	Runners-up	Semifinalists	Quarterfinalists
3 Aug	Stanford Classic; Stanford, United States; WTA Premier; Hard – $731,000 – 28S/16D; Singles – Doubles	(Germany) Angelique Kerber; 6–3, 5–7, 6–4	(Czech Republic) Karolína Plíšková	(United States) Varvara Lepchenko (Ukraine) Elina Svitolina	(Germany) Mona Barthel (Croatia) Ajla Tomljanović (United States) Alison Riske (Poland) Agnieszka Radwańska
3 Aug	Stanford Classic; Stanford, United States; WTA Premier; Hard – $731,000 – 28S/16D; Singles – Doubles	(China) Xu Yifan (China) Zheng Saisai; 6–1, 6–3	(Spain) Anabel Medina Garrigues (Spain) Arantxa Parra Santonja	(United States) Varvara Lepchenko (Ukraine) Elina Svitolina	(Germany) Mona Barthel (Croatia) Ajla Tomljanović (United States) Alison Riske (Poland) Agnieszka Radwańska
3 Aug	Washington Open; Washington, D.C., United States; WTA International; Hard – $250,000 – 32S/16D; Singles – Doubles	(United States) Sloane Stephens; 6–1, 6–2	(Russia) Anastasia Pavlyuchenkova	(Russia) Ekaterina Makarova (Australia) Samantha Stosur	(Romania) Irina-Camelia Begu (United States) Christina McHale (United States) Louisa Chirico (Romania) Monica Niculescu
3 Aug	Washington Open; Washington, D.C., United States; WTA International; Hard – $250,000 – 32S/16D; Singles – Doubles	(Switzerland) Belinda Bencic (France) Kristina Mladenovic; 7–5, 7–6^{(9–7)}	(Spain) Lara Arruabarrena (Slovenia) Andreja Klepač	(Russia) Ekaterina Makarova (Australia) Samantha Stosur	(Romania) Irina-Camelia Begu (United States) Christina McHale (United States) Louisa Chirico (Romania) Monica Niculescu
10 Aug	Canadian Open; Toronto, Canada; WTA Premier 5 Hard – $2,513,000 – 56S/48Q/28D; Singles – Doubles	(Switzerland) Belinda Bencic; 7–6^{(7–5)}, 6–7^{(4–7)}, 3–0 ret.	(Romania) Simona Halep	(United States) Serena Williams (Italy) Sara Errani	(Italy) Roberta Vinci (Serbia) Ana Ivanovic (Ukraine) Lesia Tsurenko (Poland) Agnieszka Radwańska
10 Aug	Canadian Open; Toronto, Canada; WTA Premier 5 Hard – $2,513,000 – 56S/48Q/28D; Singles – Doubles	(United States) Bethanie Mattek-Sands (Czech Republic) Lucie Šafářová; 6–1, 6–2	(France) Caroline Garcia (Slovenia) Katarina Srebotnik	(United States) Serena Williams (Italy) Sara Errani	(Italy) Roberta Vinci (Serbia) Ana Ivanovic (Ukraine) Lesia Tsurenko (Poland) Agnieszka Radwańska
17 Aug	Cincinnati Open; Mason, United States; WTA Premier 5 Hard – $2,701,240 – 56S/48Q/28D; Singles – Doubles	(United States) Serena Williams; 6–3, 7–6^{(7–5)}	(Romania) Simona Halep	(Ukraine) Elina Svitolina (Serbia) Jelena Janković	(Serbia) Ana Ivanovic (Czech Republic) Lucie Šafářová (Russia) Anastasia Pavlyuchenkova (Slovakia) Anna Karolína Schmiedlová
17 Aug	Cincinnati Open; Mason, United States; WTA Premier 5 Hard – $2,701,240 – 56S/48Q/28D; Singles – Doubles	(Chinese Taipei) Chan Hao-ching (Chinese Taipei) Chan Yung-jan; 7–5, 6–4	(Australia) Casey Dellacqua (Kazakhstan) Yaroslava Shvedova	(Ukraine) Elina Svitolina (Serbia) Jelena Janković	(Serbia) Ana Ivanovic (Czech Republic) Lucie Šafářová (Russia) Anastasia Pavlyuchenkova (Slovakia) Anna Karolína Schmiedlová
24 Aug	Connecticut Open; New Haven, United States; WTA Premier; Hard – $731,000 – 30S/48Q/16D; Singles – Doubles	(Czech Republic) Petra Kvitová; 6–7^{(6–8)}, 6–2, 6–2	(Czech Republic) Lucie Šafářová	(Ukraine) Lesia Tsurenko (Denmark) Caroline Wozniacki	(Czech Republic) Karolína Plíšková (Slovakia) Dominika Cibulková (France) Caroline Garcia (Poland) Agnieszka Radwańska
24 Aug	Connecticut Open; New Haven, United States; WTA Premier; Hard – $731,000 – 30S/48Q/16D; Singles – Doubles	(Germany) Julia Görges (Czech Republic) Lucie Hradecká; 6–3, 6–1	(Chinese Taipei) Chuang Chia-jung (China) Liang Chen	(Ukraine) Lesia Tsurenko (Denmark) Caroline Wozniacki	(Czech Republic) Karolína Plíšková (Slovakia) Dominika Cibulková (France) Caroline Garcia (Poland) Agnieszka Radwańska
31 Aug; 7 Sep	US Open; New York City, United States; Grand Slam; Hard – $11,517,008; 128S/128Q/64D/32X; Singles – Doubles – Mixed doubles	(Italy) Flavia Pennetta; 7–6^{(7–4)}, 6–2	(Italy) Roberta Vinci	(United States) Serena Williams (Romania) Simona Halep	(United States) Venus Williams (France) Kristina Mladenovic (Czech Republic) Petra Kvitová (Belarus) Victoria Azarenka
31 Aug; 7 Sep	US Open; New York City, United States; Grand Slam; Hard – $11,517,008; 128S/128Q/64D/32X; Singles – Doubles – Mixed doubles	(Switzerland) Martina Hingis (India) Sania Mirza; 6–3, 6–3	(Australia) Casey Dellacqua (Kazakhstan) Yaroslava Shvedova	(United States) Serena Williams (Romania) Simona Halep	(United States) Venus Williams (France) Kristina Mladenovic (Czech Republic) Petra Kvitová (Belarus) Victoria Azarenka
31 Aug; 7 Sep	US Open; New York City, United States; Grand Slam; Hard – $11,517,008; 128S/128Q/64D/32X; Singles – Doubles – Mixed doubles	(Switzerland) Martina Hingis (India) Leander Paes; 6–4, 3–6, [10–7]	(United States) Bethanie Mattek-Sands (United States) Sam Querrey	(United States) Serena Williams (Romania) Simona Halep	(United States) Venus Williams (France) Kristina Mladenovic (Czech Republic) Petra Kvitová (Belarus) Victoria Azarenka

=== September ===
Week	Tournament	Champions	Runners-up	Semifinalists	Quarterfinalists
14 Sep	Tournoi de Québec; Québec City, Canada; WTA International; Carpet (i) – $250,000 – 32S/24Q/16D; Singles – Doubles	(Germany) Annika Beck; 6–2, 6–2	(Latvia) Jeļena Ostapenko	(United Kingdom) Naomi Broady (Croatia) Mirjana Lučić-Baroni	(United States) Anna Tatishvili (Poland) Paula Kania (Czech Republic) Lucie Hradecká (United States) Samantha Crawford
14 Sep	Tournoi de Québec; Québec City, Canada; WTA International; Carpet (i) – $250,000 – 32S/24Q/16D; Singles – Doubles	(Czech Republic) Barbora Krejčíková (Belgium) An-Sophie Mestach; 4–6, 6–3, [12–10]	(Argentina) María Irigoyen (Poland) Paula Kania	(United Kingdom) Naomi Broady (Croatia) Mirjana Lučić-Baroni	(United States) Anna Tatishvili (Poland) Paula Kania (Czech Republic) Lucie Hradecká (United States) Samantha Crawford
14 Sep	Japan Women's Open; Tokyo, Japan; WTA International; Hard – $250,000 – 32S/16D; Singles – Doubles	(Belgium) Yanina Wickmayer; 4–6, 6–3, 6–3	(Poland) Magda Linette	(Croatia) Ajla Tomljanović (United States) Christina McHale	(Ukraine) Kateryna Bondarenko (United States) Madison Brengle (China) Zheng Saisai (Chinese Taipei) Hsieh Su-wei
14 Sep	Japan Women's Open; Tokyo, Japan; WTA International; Hard – $250,000 – 32S/16D; Singles – Doubles	(Chinese Taipei) Chan Hao-ching (Chinese Taipei) Chan Yung-jan; 6–1, 6–2	(Japan) Misaki Doi (Japan) Kurumi Nara	(Croatia) Ajla Tomljanović (United States) Christina McHale	(Ukraine) Kateryna Bondarenko (United States) Madison Brengle (China) Zheng Saisai (Chinese Taipei) Hsieh Su-wei
21 Sep	Pan Pacific Open; Tokyo, Japan; WTA Premier; Hard – $1,000,000 – 28S/16D; Singles – Doubles	(Poland) Agnieszka Radwańska; 6–2, 6–2	(Switzerland) Belinda Bencic	(Denmark) Caroline Wozniacki (Slovakia) Dominika Cibulková	(Germany) Angelique Kerber (Spain) Garbiñe Muguruza (Czech Republic) Karolína Plíšková (Serbia) Ana Ivanovic
21 Sep	Pan Pacific Open; Tokyo, Japan; WTA Premier; Hard – $1,000,000 – 28S/16D; Singles – Doubles	(Spain) Garbiñe Muguruza (Spain) Carla Suárez Navarro; 7–5, 6–1	(Chinese Taipei) Chan Hao-ching (Chinese Taipei) Chan Yung-jan	(Denmark) Caroline Wozniacki (Slovakia) Dominika Cibulková	(Germany) Angelique Kerber (Spain) Garbiñe Muguruza (Czech Republic) Karolína Plíšková (Serbia) Ana Ivanovic
21 Sep	Korea Open; Seoul, South Korea; WTA International; Hard – $500,000 – 32S/16D; Singles – Doubles	(Romania) Irina-Camelia Begu; 6–3, 6–1	(Belarus) Aliaksandra Sasnovich	(Belgium) Alison Van Uytvanck (Slovakia) Anna Karolína Schmiedlová	(Sweden) Johanna Larsson (Russia) Elizaveta Kulichkova (United States) Sloane Stephens (Germany) Mona Barthel
21 Sep	Korea Open; Seoul, South Korea; WTA International; Hard – $500,000 – 32S/16D; Singles – Doubles	(Spain) Lara Arruabarrena (Slovenia) Andreja Klepač; 2–6, 6–3, [10–6]	(Netherlands) Kiki Bertens (Sweden) Johanna Larsson	(Belgium) Alison Van Uytvanck (Slovakia) Anna Karolína Schmiedlová	(Sweden) Johanna Larsson (Russia) Elizaveta Kulichkova (United States) Sloane Stephens (Germany) Mona Barthel
21 Sep	Guangzhou International Women's Open; Guangzhou, China; WTA International; Hard – $250,000 – 32S/24Q/16D; Singles – Doubles	(Serbia) Jelena Janković; 6–2, 6–0	(Czech Republic) Denisa Allertová	(Italy) Sara Errani (Belgium) Yanina Wickmayer	(Romania) Simona Halep (China) Zheng Saisai (Russia) Svetlana Kuznetsova (Romania) Monica Niculescu
21 Sep	Guangzhou International Women's Open; Guangzhou, China; WTA International; Hard – $250,000 – 32S/24Q/16D; Singles – Doubles	(Switzerland) Martina Hingis (India) Sania Mirza; 6–3, 6–1	(China) Xu Shilin (China) You Xiaodi	(Italy) Sara Errani (Belgium) Yanina Wickmayer	(Romania) Simona Halep (China) Zheng Saisai (Russia) Svetlana Kuznetsova (Romania) Monica Niculescu
28 Sep	Wuhan Open; Wuhan, China; WTA Premier 5 Hard – $2,513,000 – 56S/28D; Singles – Doubles	(United States) Venus Williams; 6–3, 3–0 ret.	(Spain) Garbiñe Muguruza	(Italy) Roberta Vinci (Germany) Angelique Kerber	(United Kingdom) Johanna Konta (Czech Republic) Karolína Plíšková (Slovakia) Anna Karolína Schmiedlová (United States) CoCo Vandeweghe
28 Sep	Wuhan Open; Wuhan, China; WTA Premier 5 Hard – $2,513,000 – 56S/28D; Singles – Doubles	(Switzerland) Martina Hingis (India) Sania Mirza; 6–2, 6–3	(Romania) Irina-Camelia Begu (Romania) Monica Niculescu	(Italy) Roberta Vinci (Germany) Angelique Kerber	(United Kingdom) Johanna Konta (Czech Republic) Karolína Plíšková (Slovakia) Anna Karolína Schmiedlová (United States) CoCo Vandeweghe
28 Sep	Tashkent Open; Tashkent, Uzbekistan; WTA International; Hard – $250,000 – 32S/16D; Singles – Doubles	(Japan) Nao Hibino; 6–2, 6–2	(Croatia) Donna Vekić	(Serbia) Bojana Jovanovski (Russia) Evgeniya Rodina	(Germany) Annika Beck (Ukraine) Kateryna Kozlova (Sweden) Johanna Larsson (Germany) Anna-Lena Friedsam
28 Sep	Tashkent Open; Tashkent, Uzbekistan; WTA International; Hard – $250,000 – 32S/16D; Singles – Doubles	(Russia) Margarita Gasparyan (Russia) Alexandra Panova; 6–1, 3–6, [10–3]	(Russia) Vera Dushevina (Czech Republic) Kateřina Siniaková	(Serbia) Bojana Jovanovski (Russia) Evgeniya Rodina	(Germany) Annika Beck (Ukraine) Kateryna Kozlova (Sweden) Johanna Larsson (Germany) Anna-Lena Friedsam

=== October ===
Week	Tournament	Champions	Runners-up	Semifinalists	Quarterfinalists
5 Oct	China Open; Beijing, China; WTA Premier Mandatory $6,157,160 – hard – 60S/28D; Singles – Doubles	(Spain) Garbiñe Muguruza; 7–5, 6–4	(Switzerland) Timea Bacsinszky	(Poland) Agnieszka Radwańska (Serbia) Ana Ivanovic	(United States) Bethanie Mattek-Sands (Germany) Angelique Kerber (Russia) Anastasia Pavlyuchenkova (Italy) Sara Errani
5 Oct	China Open; Beijing, China; WTA Premier Mandatory $6,157,160 – hard – 60S/28D; Singles – Doubles	(Switzerland) Martina Hingis (India) Sania Mirza; 6–7^{(9–11)}, 6–1, [10–8]	(Chinese Taipei) Chan Hao-ching (Chinese Taipei) Chan Yung-jan	(Poland) Agnieszka Radwańska (Serbia) Ana Ivanovic	(United States) Bethanie Mattek-Sands (Germany) Angelique Kerber (Russia) Anastasia Pavlyuchenkova (Italy) Sara Errani
12 Oct	Tianjin Open; Tianjin, China; WTA International; Hard – $500,000 – 32S/16D; Singles – Doubles	(Poland) Agnieszka Radwańska; 6–1, 6–2	(Montenegro) Danka Kovinić	(Serbia) Bojana Jovanovski (Czech Republic) Karolína Plíšková	(China) Duan Yingying (France) Kristina Mladenovic (Hungary) Tímea Babos (Russia) Elizaveta Kulichkova
12 Oct	Tianjin Open; Tianjin, China; WTA International; Hard – $500,000 – 32S/16D; Singles – Doubles	(China) Xu Yifan (China) Zheng Saisai; 6–2, 3–6, [10–8]	(Croatia) Darija Jurak (United States) Nicole Melichar	(Serbia) Bojana Jovanovski (Czech Republic) Karolína Plíšková	(China) Duan Yingying (France) Kristina Mladenovic (Hungary) Tímea Babos (Russia) Elizaveta Kulichkova
12 Oct	Hong Kong Open; Hong Kong; WTA International; Hard – $250,000 – 32S/24Q/16D; Singles – Doubles	(Serbia) Jelena Janković; 3–6, 7–6^{(7–4)}, 6–1	(Germany) Angelique Kerber	(United States) Venus Williams (Australia) Samantha Stosur	(France) Alizé Cornet (Russia) Daria Gavrilova (United Kingdom) Heather Watson (France) Caroline Garcia
12 Oct	Hong Kong Open; Hong Kong; WTA International; Hard – $250,000 – 32S/24Q/16D; Singles – Doubles	(France) Alizé Cornet (Kazakhstan) Yaroslava Shvedova; 7–5, 6–4	(Spain) Lara Arruabarrena (Slovenia) Andreja Klepač	(United States) Venus Williams (Australia) Samantha Stosur	(France) Alizé Cornet (Russia) Daria Gavrilova (United Kingdom) Heather Watson (France) Caroline Garcia
12 Oct	Linz Open; Linz, Austria; WTA International; Hard (i) – $250,000 – 32S/16D; Singles – Doubles	(Russia) Anastasia Pavlyuchenkova; 6–4, 6–3	(Germany) Anna-Lena Friedsam	(Sweden) Johanna Larsson (Belgium) Kirsten Flipkens	(Russia) Margarita Gasparyan (United States) Madison Brengle (Serbia) Aleksandra Krunić (Czech Republic) Denisa Allertová
12 Oct	Linz Open; Linz, Austria; WTA International; Hard (i) – $250,000 – 32S/16D; Singles – Doubles	(United States) Raquel Kops-Jones (United States) Abigail Spears; 6–3, 7–5	(Czech Republic) Andrea Hlaváčková (Czech Republic) Lucie Hradecká	(Sweden) Johanna Larsson (Belgium) Kirsten Flipkens	(Russia) Margarita Gasparyan (United States) Madison Brengle (Serbia) Aleksandra Krunić (Czech Republic) Denisa Allertová
19 Oct	Kremlin Cup; Moscow, Russia; WTA Premier; Hard (i) – $768,000 – 28S/16D; Singles – Doubles	(Russia) Svetlana Kuznetsova; 6–2, 6–1	(Russia) Anastasia Pavlyuchenkova	(Ukraine) Lesia Tsurenko (Russia) Daria Kasatkina	(Italy) Flavia Pennetta (Latvia) Anastasija Sevastova (Spain) Carla Suárez Navarro (Russia) Margarita Gasparyan
19 Oct	Kremlin Cup; Moscow, Russia; WTA Premier; Hard (i) – $768,000 – 28S/16D; Singles – Doubles	(Russia) Daria Kasatkina (Russia) Elena Vesnina; 6–3, 6–7^{(7–9)}, [10–5]	(Romania) Irina-Camelia Begu (Romania) Monica Niculescu	(Ukraine) Lesia Tsurenko (Russia) Daria Kasatkina	(Italy) Flavia Pennetta (Latvia) Anastasija Sevastova (Spain) Carla Suárez Navarro (Russia) Margarita Gasparyan
19 Oct	Luxembourg Open; Kockelscheuer, Luxembourg; WTA International; Hard (i) – $250,000 – 32S/16D; Singles – Doubles	(Japan) Misaki Doi; 6–4, 6–7^{(7–9)}, 6–0	(Germany) Mona Barthel	(Switzerland) Stefanie Vögele (Belgium) Alison Van Uytvanck	(Germany) Laura Siegemund (Croatia) Mirjana Lučić-Baroni (Serbia) Jelena Janković (Czech Republic) Barbora Strýcová
19 Oct	Luxembourg Open; Kockelscheuer, Luxembourg; WTA International; Hard (i) – $250,000 – 32S/16D; Singles – Doubles	(Germany) Mona Barthel (Germany) Laura Siegemund; 6–2, 7–6^{(7–2)}	(Spain) Anabel Medina Garrigues (Spain) Arantxa Parra Santonja	(Switzerland) Stefanie Vögele (Belgium) Alison Van Uytvanck	(Germany) Laura Siegemund (Croatia) Mirjana Lučić-Baroni (Serbia) Jelena Janković (Czech Republic) Barbora Strýcová
26 Oct	WTA Finals; Singapore; Year-end championships Hard (i) – $7,000,000 – 8S (RR)/8D (RR); Singles – Doubles	(Poland) Agnieszka Radwańska; 6–2, 4–6, 6–3	(Czech Republic) Petra Kvitová	(Russia) Maria Sharapova (Spain) Garbiñe Muguruza	Round robin (Romania) Simona Halep (Italy) Flavia Pennetta (Germany) Angelique Kerber (Czech Republic) Lucie Šafářová
26 Oct	WTA Finals; Singapore; Year-end championships Hard (i) – $7,000,000 – 8S (RR)/8D (RR); Singles – Doubles	(Switzerland) Martina Hingis (India) Sania Mirza; 6–0, 6–3	(Spain) Garbiñe Muguruza (Spain) Carla Suárez Navarro	(Russia) Maria Sharapova (Spain) Garbiñe Muguruza	Round robin (Romania) Simona Halep (Italy) Flavia Pennetta (Germany) Angelique Kerber (Czech Republic) Lucie Šafářová

=== November ===
Week	Tournament	Champions	Runners-up	Semifinalists	Round robin
2 Nov	WTA Elite Trophy; Zhuhai, China; Year-end championships Hard – $2,150,000 – 12S (RR)/6D (RR); Singles – Doubles	(United States) Venus Williams; 7–5, 7–6^{(8–6)}	(Czech Republic) Karolína Plíšková	(Italy) Roberta Vinci (Ukraine) Elina Svitolina	(United States) Madison Keys (China) Zheng Saisai (Spain) Carla Suárez Navarro (Germany) Andrea Petkovic (Serbia) Jelena Janković (Italy) Sara Errani (Russia) Svetlana Kuznetsova (Slovakia) Anna Karolína Schmiedlová(Alt) (Denmark) Caroline Wozniacki
2 Nov	WTA Elite Trophy; Zhuhai, China; Year-end championships Hard – $2,150,000 – 12S (RR)/6D (RR); Singles – Doubles	(China) Liang Chen (China) Wang Yafan; 6–4, 6–3	(Spain) Anabel Medina Garrigues (Spain) Arantxa Parra Santonja	(Italy) Roberta Vinci (Ukraine) Elina Svitolina	(United States) Madison Keys (China) Zheng Saisai (Spain) Carla Suárez Navarro (Germany) Andrea Petkovic (Serbia) Jelena Janković (Italy) Sara Errani (Russia) Svetlana Kuznetsova (Slovakia) Anna Karolína Schmiedlová(Alt) (Denmark) Caroline Wozniacki
Nov 14–15	Fed Cup Final; Prague, Czech Republic – Hard (i)	Czech Republic; 3–2	Russia		

== Statistical information ==
These tables present the number of singles (S), doubles (D), and mixed doubles (X) titles won by each player and each nation during the season, within all the tournament categories of the 2015 WTA Tour: the Grand Slam tournaments, the year-end championships (the WTA Tour Championships and the Tournament of Champions), the WTA Premier tournaments (Premier Mandatory, Premier 5, and regular Premier), and the WTA International tournaments. The players/nations are sorted by: 1) total number of titles (a doubles title won by two players representing the same nation counts as only one win for the nation); 2) cumulated importance of those titles (one Grand Slam win equalling two Premier Mandatory/Premier 5 wins, one year-end championships win equalling one-and-a-half Premier Mandatory/Premier 5 win, one Premier Mandatory/Premier 5 win equalling two Premier wins, one Premier win equalling two International wins); 3) a singles > doubles > mixed doubles hierarchy; 4) alphabetical order (by family names for players).

=== Key ===
Grand Slam tournaments
Year-end championships
WTA Premier Mandatory
WTA Premier 5
WTA Premier
WTA International

=== Titles won by player ===
Total	Player	Grand Slam			Year-end		Premier Mandatory		Premier 5		Premier		International		Total		
Total	Player	S	D	X	S	D	S	D	S	D	S	D	S	D	S	D	X
13	Martina Hingis (SUI)		● ●	● ● ●		●		● ● ●		●		● ●		●	0	10	3
10	Sania Mirza (IND)		● ●			●		● ● ●		●		● ●		●	0	10	0
6	Bethanie Mattek-Sands (USA)		● ●	●						●		● ●			0	5	1
5	Serena Williams (USA)	● ● ●					●		●						5	0	0
5	Lucie Šafářová (CZE)		● ●							●	●	●			1	4	0
4	Belinda Bencic (SUI)								●		●			● ●	2	2	0
4	Kristina Mladenovic (FRA)									● ●				● ●	0	4	0
4	Chan Hao-ching (TPE)									●				● ● ●	0	4	0
4	Angelique Kerber (GER)										● ● ● ●				4	0	0
3	Venus Williams (USA)				●				●				●		3	0	0
3	Agnieszka Radwańska (POL)				●						●		●		3	0	0
3	Liang Chen (CHN)					●								● ●	0	3	0
3	Simona Halep (ROU)						●		●				●		3	0	0
3	Petra Kvitová (CZE)						●				● ●				3	0	0
3	Tímea Babos (HUN)									● ●				●	0	3	0
3	Chan Yung-jan (TPE)									●				● ●	0	3	0
3	Garbiñe Muguruza (ESP)						●					● ●			1	2	0
3	Raquel Kops-Jones (USA)											●		● ●	0	3	0
3	Abigail Spears (USA)											●		● ●	0	3	0
3	Johanna Larsson (SWE)												●	● ●	1	2	0
3	Margarita Gasparyan (RUS)												●	● ●	1	2	0
3	Laura Siegemund (GER)													● ● ●	0	3	0
2	Wang Yafan (CHN)					●								●	0	2	0
2	Yaroslava Shvedova (KAZ)							●						●	0	2	0
2	Maria Sharapova (RUS)								●		●				2	0	0
2	Carla Suárez Navarro (ESP)											● ●			0	2	0
2	Anabel Medina Garrigues (ESP)											●		●	0	2	0
2	Xu Yifan (CHN)											●		●	0	2	0
2	Zheng Saisai (CHN)											●		●	0	2	0
2	Timea Bacsinszky (SUI)												● ●		2	0	0
2	Jelena Janković (SRB)												● ●		2	0	0
2	Teliana Pereira (BRA)												● ●		2	0	0
2	Anna Karolína Schmiedlová (SVK)												● ●		2	0	0
2	Samantha Stosur (AUS)												● ●		2	0	0
2	Annika Beck (GER)												●	●	1	1	0
2	Sara Errani (ITA)												●	●	1	1	0
2	Elina Svitolina (UKR)												●	●	1	1	0
2	Lara Arruabarrena (ESP)													● ●	0	2	0
2	Kiki Bertens (NED)													● ●	0	2	0
2	Ysaline Bonaventure (BEL)													● ●	0	2	0
2	Alexandra Panova (RUS)													● ●	0	2	0
2	Demi Schuurs (NED)													● ●	0	2	0
1	Flavia Pennetta (ITA)	●													1	0	0
1	Casey Dellacqua (AUS)							●							0	1	0
1	Svetlana Kuznetsova (RUS)										●				1	0	0
1	Andrea Petkovic (GER)										●				1	0	0
1	Lucie Hradecká (CZE)											●			0	1	0
1	Caroline Garcia (FRA)											●			0	1	0
1	Julia Görges (GER)											●			0	1	0
1	Daria Kasatkina (RUS)											●			0	1	0
1	Sabine Lisicki (GER)											●			0	1	0
1	Arantxa Parra Santonja (ESP)											●			0	1	0
1	Katarina Srebotnik (SLO)											●			0	1	0
1	Elena Vesnina (RUS)											●			0	1	0
1	Irina-Camelia Begu (ROU)												●		1	0	0
1	Misaki Doi (JPN)												●		1	0	0
1	Camila Giorgi (ITA)												●		1	0	0
1	Daniela Hantuchová (SVK)												●		1	0	0
1	Nao Hibino (JPN)												●		1	0	0
1	Karin Knapp (ITA)												●		1	0	0
1	Ana Konjuh (CRO)												●		1	0	0
1	Anastasia Pavlyuchenkova (RUS)												●		1	0	0
1	Karolína Plíšková (CZE)												●		1	0	0
1	Sloane Stephens (USA)												●		1	0	0
1	Lesia Tsurenko (UKR)												●		1	0	0
1	Heather Watson (GBR)												●		1	0	0
1	Yanina Wickmayer (BEL)												●		1	0	0
1	Caroline Wozniacki (DNK)												●		1	0	0
1	Mona Barthel (GER)													●	0	1	0
1	Chuang Chia-jung (TPE)													●	0	1	0
1	Alizé Cornet (FRA)													●	0	1	0
1	Gabriela Dabrowski (CAN)													●	0	1	0
1	Daria Gavrilova (RUS)													●	0	1	0
1	Paula Cristina Gonçalves (BRA)													●	0	1	0
1	Beatriz Haddad Maia (BRA)													●	0	1	0
1	Oksana Kalashnikova (GEO)													●	0	1	0
1	Lyudmyla Kichenok (UKR)													●	0	1	0
1	Nadiia Kichenok (UKR)													●	0	1	0
1	Andreja Klepač (SLO)													●	0	1	0
1	Danka Kovinić (MNE)													●	0	1	0
1	Barbora Krejčíková (CZE)													●	0	1	0
1	An-Sophie Mestach (BEL)													●	0	1	0
1	Asia Muhammad (USA)													●	0	1	0
1	Rebecca Peterson (SWE)													●	0	1	0
1	Alicja Rosolska (POL)													●	0	1	0
1	Kateřina Siniaková (CZE)													●	0	1	0
1	María Teresa Torró Flor (ESP)													●	0	1	0
1	Roberta Vinci (ITA)													●	0	1	0
1	Stephanie Vogt (LIE)													●	0	1	0

=== Titles won by nation ===
Total	Nation	Grand Slam			Year-end		Premier Mandatory		Premier 5		Premier		International		Total		
Total	Nation	S	D	X	S	D	S	D	S	D	S	D	S	D	S	D	X
19	United States (USA)	3	2	1	1		1		2	1		3	2	3	9	9	1
19	Switzerland (SUI)		2	3		1		3	1	1	1	2	2	3	4	12	3
12	Czech Republic (CZE)		2				1			1	3	2	1	2	5	7	0
11	Germany (GER)										5	2	1	3	6	5	0
10	India (IND)		2			1		3		1		2		1	0	10	0
9	Russia (RUS)								1		2	1	2	3	5	4	0
7	Spain (ESP)						1					3		3	1	6	0
6	France (FRA)									2		1		3	0	6	0
5	Italy (ITA)	1											3	1	4	1	0
5	China (CHN)					1						1		3	0	5	0
5	Chinese Taipei (TPE)									1				4	0	5	0
4	Poland (POL)				1						1		1	1	3	1	0
4	Romania (ROU)						1		1				2		4	0	0
4	Ukraine (UKR)												2	2	2	2	0
4	Belgium (BEL)												1	3	1	3	0
4	Sweden (SWE)												1	3	1	3	0
4	Netherlands (NED)													4	0	4	0
3	Australia (AUS)							1					2		2	1	0
3	Hungary (HUN)									2				1	0	3	0
3	Slovakia (SVK)												3		3	0	0
3	Brazil (BRA)												2	1	2	1	0
2	Kazakhstan (KAZ)							1						1	0	2	0
2	Slovenia (SLO)											1		1	0	2	0
2	Japan (JPN)												2		2	0	0
2	Serbia (SRB)												2		2	0	0
1	Croatia (CRO)												1		1	0	0
1	Denmark (DNK)												1		1	0	0
1	Great Britain (GBR)												1		1	0	0
1	Canada (CAN)													1	0	1	0
1	Georgia (GEO)													1	0	1	0
1	Liechtenstein (LIE)													1	0	1	0
1	Montenegro (MNE)													1	0	1	0

=== Titles information ===
The following players won their first main circuit title in singles, doubles, or mixed doubles:

Singles
- (Slovakia) Anna Karolína Schmiedlová – Katowice (draw)
- (Brazil) Teliana Pereira – Bogotá (draw)
- (Italy) Camila Giorgi – Rosmalen (draw)
- (Croatia) Ana Konjuh – Nottingham (draw)
- (Switzerland) Belinda Bencic – Eastbourne (draw)
- (Sweden) Johanna Larsson – Båstad (draw)
- (Ukraine) Lesia Tsurenko – Istanbul (draw)
- (Russia) Margarita Gasparyan – Baku (draw)
- (United States) Sloane Stephens – Washington, D.C. (draw)
- (Japan) Nao Hibino – Tashkent (draw)
- (Japan) Misaki Doi – Luxembourg (draw)

Doubles
- (Ukraine) Lyudmyla Kichenok – Shenzhen (draw)
- (Ukraine) Nadiia Kichenok – Shenzhen (draw)
- (Netherlands) Kiki Bertens – Hobart (draw)
- (Belgium) Ysaline Bonaventure – Rio de Janeiro (draw)
- (Sweden) Rebecca Peterson – Rio de Janeiro (draw)
- (China) Wang Yafan – Kuala Lumpur (draw)
- (Netherlands) Demi Schuurs – Katowice (draw)
- (Brazil) Paula Cristina Gonçalves – Bogotá (draw)
- (Brazil) Beatriz Haddad Maia – Bogotá (draw)
- (Switzerland) Belinda Bencic – Prague (draw)
- (United States) Asia Muhammad – Rosmalen (draw)
- (Germany) Laura Siegemund – Rosmalen (draw)
- (Russia) Daria Gavrilova – Istanbul (draw)
- (Montenegro) Danka Kovinić – Bad Gastein (draw)
- (Germany) Annika Beck – Florianópolis (draw)
- (Russia) Margarita Gasparyan – Baku (draw)
- (Czech Republic) Barbora Krejčíková – Québec City (draw)
- (Belgium) An-Sophie Mestach – Québec City (draw)
- (Russia) Daria Kasatkina – Moscow (draw)

The following players defended a main circuit title in singles, doubles, or mixed doubles:

Singles
- (United States) Serena Williams – Miami (draw), Cincinnati (draw)
- (Czech Republic) Petra Kvitová – New Haven (draw)

Doubles
- (Switzerland) Martina Hingis – Miami (draw), Wuhan (draw)
- (Ukraine) Elina Svitolina – Istanbul (draw)
- (Russia) Alexandra Panova – Baku (draw)
- (Spain) Lara Arruabarrena – Seoul (draw)
- (India) Sania Mirza – WTA Finals (draw)

=== Top 10 entry ===
The following players entered the top 10 for the first time in their careers:

Singles
- (Russia) Ekaterina Makarova (enters at #9 on February 2)
- (Spain) Carla Suárez Navarro (enters at #10 on April 6)
- (Czech Republic) Lucie Šafářová (enters at #7 on June 8)
- (Spain) Garbiñe Muguruza (enters at #9 on July 13)
- (Czech Republic) Karolína Plíšková (enters at #8 on August 10)
- (Switzerland) Timea Bacsinszky (enters at #10 on October 12)

Doubles
- (Spain) Garbiñe Muguruza (enters at #10 on February 23)
- (United States) Raquel Kops-Jones (enters at #10 on March 2)
- (United States) Abigail Spears (enters at #10 on March 2)
- (France) Kristina Mladenovic (enters at #10 on April 6)
- (United States) Bethanie Mattek-Sands (enters at #6 on June 8)
- (Czech Republic) Lucie Šafářová (enters at #5 on June 8)
- (Hungary) Tímea Babos (enters at #10 on June 8)

== WTA rankings ==
These are the WTA rankings of the top 20 singles players, doubles players, and the top 10 doubles teams on the WTA Tour, at the current date of the 2015 season. Players with a gold background qualified for the WTA Finals.

=== Singles ===
WTA Championships Race Rankings, as of 26 October 2015
#	Player	Points
inj	(United States) Serena Williams	9,945
1	Simona Halep (ROU)	5790
2	Garbiñe Muguruza (ESP)	4511
3	Maria Sharapova (RUS)	4322
4	Petra Kvitová (CZE)	3491
5	Agnieszka Radwańska (POL)	3425
6	Angelique Kerber (GER)	3400
7	Flavia Pennetta (ITA)	3252
8	Lucie Šafářová (CZE)	3221
9	Timea Bacsinszky (SUI)	3133
10	Venus Williams (USA)	3091
11	Carla Suárez Navarro (ESP)	3030
12	Karolína Plíšková (CZE)	2955
13	Belinda Bencic (SUI)	2900
14	Roberta Vinci (ITA)	2655
15	Caroline Wozniacki (DEN)	2641
16	Ana Ivanovic (SRB)	2616
17	Sara Errani (ITA)	2525
18	Madison Keys (USA)	2495
19	Elina Svitolina (UKR)	2410
20	Jelena Janković (SRB)	2345

Champion

Player has qualified for the 2015 WTA Finals

WTA Singles Year-End Rankings
#	Player	Points	#Trn	'14 Rk	High	Low	'14→'15
1	Serena Williams (USA)	9,945	16	1	1	1	Steady
2	Simona Halep (ROU)	6,060	18	3	2	4	▲1
3	Garbiñe Muguruza (ESP)	5,200	20	21	3	24	▲18
4	Maria Sharapova (RUS)	5,011	17	2	2	4	▼2
5	Agnieszka Radwańska (POL)	4,500	24	6	5	15	▲1
6	Petra Kvitová (CZE)	4,220	19	4	2	6	▼2
7	Venus Williams (USA)	3,790	18	19	7	24	▲12
8	Flavia Pennetta (ITA)	3,621	20	13	6	28	▲5
9	Lucie Šafářová (CZE)	3,590	22	17	5	17	▲8
10	Angelique Kerber (GER)	3,590	25	10	7	16	Steady
11	Karolína Plíšková (CZE)	3,285	26	24	7	25	▲13
12	Timea Bacsinszky (SUI)	3,133	17	48	10	47	▲35
13	Carla Suárez Navarro (ESP)	3,090	25	18	8	17	▲5
14	Belinda Bencic (SUI)	2,900	24	33	12	37	▲19
15	Roberta Vinci (ITA)	2,785	25	49	15	58	▲34
16	Ana Ivanovic (SRB)	2,645	19	5	5	16	▼11
17	Caroline Wozniacki (DEN)	2,641	24	8	4	17	▼9
18	Madison Keys (USA)	2,600	19	31	16	35	▲13
19	Elina Svitolina (UKR)	2,590	25	29	15	29	▲10
20	Sara Errani (ITA)	2,525	26	15	12	22	▼5

Holder	Date gained	Date forfeited
Serena Williams (USA)	Year-End 2014	Year-End 2015

=== Doubles ===
WTA Championships Race Rankings as of 26 October 2015
#	Player	Points	Tours
1	Martina Hingis (SUI); Sania Mirza (IND)	10,085	15
2	Bethanie Mattek-Sands (USA); Lucie Šafářová (CZE)	6,390	8
3	Casey Dellacqua (AUS); Yaroslava Shvedova (KAZ)	5,111	8
4	Ekaterina Makarova (RUS); Elena Vesnina (RUS)	4,586	10
5	Tímea Babos (HUN); Kristina Mladenovic (FRA)	4,340	18
6	Chan Hao-ching (TPE); Chan Yung-jan (TPE)	3,705	13
7	Caroline Garcia (FRA); Katarina Srebotnik (SLO)	3,705	18
8	Raquel Kops-Jones (USA); Abigail Spears (USA)	3,380	19
9	Andrea Hlaváčková (CZE); Lucie Hradecká (CZE)	3,130	17
10	Garbiñe Muguruza (ESP); Carla Suárez Navarro (ESP)	3,100	13

Champion

Team has qualified for the 2015 WTA Finals
Team has withdrawn for the 2015 WTA Finals due to injury

WTA Doubles Year-End Rankings
#	Player	Points	#Trn	2014 rank	'14→'15
1	Sania Mirza (IND)	11,355	22	6	▲5
2	Martina Hingis (SUI)	11,355	22	11	▲9
3	Bethanie Mattek-Sands (USA)	7,450	13	268	▲265
4	Lucie Šafářová (CZE)	6,866	12	29	▲25
5	Casey Dellacqua (AUS)	5,835	17	31	▲26
6	Yaroslava Shvedova (KAZ)	5,720	13	24	▲18
7	Chan Yung-jan (TPE)	5,570	20	35	▲28
8	Elena Vesnina (RUS)	5,275	16	7	▼1
9	Kristina Mladenovic (FRA)	5,095	22	21	▲12
10	Ekaterina Makarova (RUS)	4,586	10	7	▼3
11	Tímea Babos (HUN)	4,580	20	21	▲10
12	Chan Hao-ching (TPE)	4485	27	27	▲15
13	Carla Suárez Navarro (ESP)	3,885	14	20	▲7
14	Caroline Garcia (FRA)	3,860	19	26	▲12
14	Katarina Srebotnik (SLO)	3,860	21	10	▼4
16	Garbiñe Muguruza (ESP)	3,842	14	14	Steady
17	Lucie Hradecká (CZE)	3,720	23	22	▲5
18	Raquel Kops-Jones (USA)	3,650	25	12	▼6
18	Abigail Spears (USA)	3,650	25	12	▼6
20	Andrea Hlaváčková (CZE)	3,380	20	15	▼5

==== Number 1 ranking ====
Holder	Date gained	Date forfeited
Sara Errani (ITA); Roberta Vinci (ITA)	Year-end 2014	12 April 2015
Sania Mirza (IND)	13 April 2015	Year-end 2015

== Prize money leaders ==
#	Player	Singles	Doubles	Mixed	Year-to-date
1	Serena Williams (USA)	$10,582,642	$0	$0	$10,582,642
2	Garbiñe Muguruza (ESP)	$4,168,418	$329,890	$0	$4,498,308
3	Flavia Pennetta (ITA)	$4,174,427	$231,578	$0	$4,406,005
4	Agnieszka Radwańska (POL)	$4,102,293	$0	$0	$4,102,293
5	Maria Sharapova (RUS)	$3,949,284	$0	$0	$3,949,284
6	Simona Halep (ROU)	$3,890,231	$22,896	$5,000	$3,918,127
7	Petra Kvitová (CZE)	$3,038,722	$0	$0	$3,038,722
8	Lucie Šafářová (CZE)	$2,195,988	$750,273	$0	$2,946,261
9	Venus Williams (USA)	$2,404,419	$0	$0	$2,404,419
10	Roberta Vinci (ITA)	$2,220,284	$89,537	$0	$2,309,821
Prize money given in US$; as of November 9, 2015

== Statistics leaders ==
as of November 16, 2015

Aces
	Player	Aces	Matches
1	(Czech Republic) Karolína Plíšková	517	75
2	(United States) Serena Williams	498	53
3	(United States) Madison Keys	328	49
4	(Australia) Samantha Stosur	282	55
5	(France) Kristina Mladenovic	270	59
6	(Czech Republic) Lucie Šafářová	267	52
7	(Germany) Sabine Lisicki	262	41
8	(United States) CoCo Vandeweghe	260	41
9	(France) Caroline Garcia	255	56
10	(United States) Venus Williams	235	52

Double faults
	Player	DFs	Matches
1	(Italy) Camila Giorgi	458	46
2	(France) Alizé Cornet	302	49
3	(Croatia) Mirjana Lučić-Baroni	274	42
4	(Russia) Anastasia Pavlyuchenkova	260	55
5	(Serbia) Jelena Janković	256	64
6	(Serbia) Ana Ivanovic	235	47
7	(Czech Republic) Karolína Plíšková	234	75
8	(Slovakia) Anna Karolína Schmiedlová	233	58
9	(France) Kristina Mladenovic	233	59
10	(Russia) Maria Sharapova	232	44

First-serve percentage
	Player	%	Matches
1	(Italy) Sara Errani	82.8	72
2	(Brazil) Teliana Pereira	73.2	25
3	(Germany) Annika Beck	72.7	41
4	(Japan) Kurumi Nara	71.2	43
5	(Romania) Alexandra Dulgheru	69.7	27
6	(Kazakhstan) Zarina Diyas	69.2	46
7	(Romania) Monica Niculescu	68.8	41
8	(Spain) Lara Arruabarrena	68.6	32
9	(Germany) Angelique Kerber	68.4	72
10	(Denmark) Caroline Wozniacki	68.2	62

Second-serve percentage
	Player	%	Matches
1	(Italy) Francesca Schiavone	47.2	30
2	(Czech Republic) Klára Koukalová	47.1	35
3	(Montenegro) Danka Kovinić	46.6	30
4	(Czech Republic) Lucie Hradecká	46.6	34
5	(United States) CoCo Vandeweghe	46.0	41
6	(Germany) Tatjana Maria	45.2	26
7	(Croatia) Mirjana Lučić-Baroni	44.3	42
8	(Italy) Camila Giorgi	44.2	46
9	(Italy) Flavia Pennetta	43.8	46
10	(Serbia) Aleksandra Krunić	43.5	31

First-serve points won
	Player	%	Matches
1	(United States) Serena Williams	75.9	53
2	(Czech Republic) Lucie Hradecká	71.9	34
3	(Czech Republic) Karolína Plíšková	71.7	75
4	(Russia) Maria Sharapova	71.5	44
5	(United States) CoCo Vandeweghe	70.3	41
6	(United States) Madison Keys	70.3	49
7	(Czech Republic) Lucie Šafářová	70.1	52
8	(United States) Venus Williams	69.8	52
9	(Czech Republic) Petra Kvitová	69.7	51
10	(Australia) Samantha Stosur	68.8	55

Second-serve points won
	Player	%	Matches
1	(Australia) Samantha Stosur	53.1	55
2	(Russia) Ekaterina Makarova	51.4	41
3	(United States) CoCo Vandeweghe	49.7	41
4	(Sweden) Johanna Larsson	49.7	44
5	(Czech Republic) Lucie Šafářová	49.6	52
6	(United States) Sloane Stephens	49.6	52
7	(Russia) Maria Sharapova	48.8	44
8	(United States) Serena Williams	48.8	53
9	(United States) Madison Keys	48.5	49
10	(Switzerland) Timea Bacsinszky	48.2	51

Service points won
	Player	%	Matches
1	(United States) Serena Williams	64.4	53
2	(Russia) Maria Sharapova	62.5	44
3	(Czech Republic) Lucie Šafářová	62.4	52
4	(Australia) Samantha Stosur	62.2	55
5	(United States) Madison Keys	61.7	49
6	(Czech Republic) Petra Kvitová	61.4	51
7	(Czech Republic) Karolína Plíšková	61.2	75
8	(United States) CoCo Vandeweghe	60.8	41
9	(Poland) Agnieszka Radwańska	60.6	72
10	(Russia) Ekaterina Makarova	60.1	41

Return points won
	Player	%	Matches
1	(Italy) Sara Errani	50.8	72
2	(Romania) Simona Halep	48.4	64
3	(Germany) Annika Beck	48.0	41
4	(Belarus) Victoria Azarenka	47.6	44
5	(United States) Serena Williams	47.5	53
6	(Germany) Angelique Kerber	47.4	72
7	(Poland) Agnieszka Radwańska	47.2	72
8	(Denmark) Caroline Wozniacki	47.0	62
9	(Brazil) Teliana Pereira	46.9	25
10	(Russia) Maria Sharapova	46.8	44

Service games won
	Player	%	Matches
1	(United States) Serena Williams	81.1	53
2	(Russia) Maria Sharapova	79.9	44
3	(Czech Republic) Lucie Šafářová	77.9	52
4	(Australia) Samantha Stosur	76.0	55
5	(Czech Republic) Karolína Plíšková	75.8	75
6	(United States) Madison Keys	75.2	49
7	(Czech Republic) Petra Kvitová	74.8	51
8	(Poland) Agnieszka Radwańska	73.4	72
9	(Russia) Ekaterina Makarova	73.4	41
10	(Spain) Garbiñe Muguruza	73.1	58

Return games won
	Player	%	Matches
1	(Italy) Sara Errani	51.9	72
2	(Romania) Simona Halep	47.1	64
3	(Belarus) Victoria Azarenka	45.4	44
4	(Germany) Annika Beck	44.3	41
5	(Poland) Agnieszka Radwańska	44.1	72
6	(Germany) Angelique Kerber	43.9	72
7	(United States) Serena Williams	43.8	53
8	(Denmark) Caroline Wozniacki	43.2	62
9	(Brazil) Teliana Pereira	43.0	25
10	(Ukraine) Lesia Tsurenko	42.5	37

Break points saved
	Player	%	Matches
1	(Czech Republic) Karolína Plíšková	64.3	75
2	(United States) Serena Williams	63.4	53
3	(Russia) Maria Sharapova	62.4	44
4	(Belarus) Victoria Azarenka	62.1	44
5	(France) Caroline Garcia	61.5	56
6	(United States) Madison Keys	61.5	49
7	(Belgium) Alison Van Uytvanck	61.0	37
8	(Czech Republic) Lucie Šafářová	60.9	52
9	(Spain) Garbiñe Muguruza	60.6	58
10	(United States) Sloane Stephens	60.2	52

Break points converted
	Player	%	Matches
1	(Brazil) Teliana Pereira	56.7	25
2	(Germany) Annika Beck	53.9	41
3	(Italy) Sara Errani	53.3	72
4	(United States) Irina Falconi	52.6	29
5	(Belarus) Victoria Azarenka	51.0	44
6	(United States) Lauren Davis	50.9	34
7	(Bulgaria) Tsvetana Pironkova	50.3	39
8	(United Kingdom) Heather Watson	50.2	37
9	(Poland) Agnieszka Radwańska	49.8	72
10	(Slovakia) Anna Karolína Schmiedlová	49.8	58

== Points distribution ==
The points distribution was mostly the same for the 2015 season. Main draw rounds usually give a little less points, but there is no change for the champion (W). Points for qualifying rounds (Q) have changed in both directions depending on the tournament category. Points earned in 2014 retain their value until they expire after 52 weeks. What changed are the distribution of points for the WTA Finals and WTA Elite Trophy.

Category	W	F	SF	QF	R16	R32	R64	R128	Q	Q3	Q2	Q1
Grand Slam (S)	2000	1300	780	430	240	130	70	10	40	30	20	2
Grand Slam (D)	2000	1300	780	430	240	130	10	–	40	–	–	–
WTA Finals (S)	1500*	1050*	690*	(+70 per round robin match; +160 per round robin win)								
WTA Finals (D)	1500*	1050*	690*	(+70 per round robin match; +160 per round robin win)								
WTA Premier Mandatory (96S)	1000	650	390	215	120	65	35	10	30	–	20	2
WTA Premier Mandatory (64/60S)	1000	650	390	215	120	65	10	–	30	–	20	2
WTA Premier Mandatory (28/32D)	1000	650	390	215	120	10	–	–	–	–	–	–
WTA Premier 5 (56S,64Q)	900	585	350	190	105	60	1	–	30	22	15	1
WTA Premier 5 (56/54S,48/32Q)	900	585	350	190	105	60	1	–	30	–	20	1
WTA Premier 5 (28D)	900	585	350	190	105	1	–	–	–	–	–	–
WTA Premier 5 (16D)	900	585	350	190	1	–	–	–	–	–	–	–
WTA Elite Trophy (S)	700*	440*	240*	(+40 per round robin match; +80 per round robin win)								
WTA Premier (56S)	470	305	185	100	55	30	1	–	25	–	13	1
WTA Premier (32S)	470	305	185	100	55	1	–	–	25	18	13	1
WTA Premier (16D)	470	305	185	100	1	–	–	–	–	–	–	–
WTA International (32S,32Q)	280	180	110	60	30	1	–	–	18	14	10	1
WTA International (32S,16Q)	280	180	110	60	30	1	–	–	18	–	12	1
WTA International (16D)	280	180	110	60	1	–	–	–	–	–	–	–

* Assumes undefeated round robin match record.

== WTA fan polls ==
=== Player of the Month ===
Month	Player	Nationality
January	Serena Williams	United States
February	Simona Halep	Romania
March	Serena Williams (2)	United States
April	Angelique Kerber	Germany
May	Serena Williams (3)	United States
June	Serena Williams (4)	United States
July	Samantha Stosur	Australia
August	Belinda Bencic	Switzerland
September	Flavia Pennetta	Italy
October	Agnieszka Radwańska	Poland

=== Shot of the Month ===
Month	Player	Nationality
January	Maria Sharapova	Russia
February	Simona Halep	Romania
March	Agnieszka Radwańska	Poland
April	Angelique Kerber	Germany
May	Agnieszka Radwańska (2)	Poland
June	Ana Ivanovic	Serbia
July	Not Awarded	
August	Simona Halep (2)	Romania
September	Agnieszka Radwańska (3)	Poland
October	Agnieszka Radwańska (4)	Poland

== Retirements ==
Following is a list of notable players (winners of a main tour title, and/or part of the WTA rankings top 100 (singles) or (doubles) for at least one week) who announced their retirement from professional tennis, became inactive (after not playing for more than 52 weeks), or were permanently banned from playing, during the 2015 season:

List of Retirements
- Julie Coin (born 2 December 1982, in Amiens, France), joined the pro tour in 1999. Her career-high singles ranking is world no. 60, achieved on 27 July 2009. Her career-high doubles ranking is world no. 49, achieved on 19 April 2010. Coin has won 10 singles and 16 doubles titles on the ITF tour in her career. Coin recorded the biggest win of her career by defeating the world no. 1 ranked female singles player, and top seed, Ana Ivanovic at the 2008 US Open. She announced November 2015 that the 2015 Open de Limoges will be her last tournament, her retirement from professional tennis.
- Marta Domachowska (born 16 January 1986 in Warsaw, Poland), joined the pro tour in 2001. Her career-high singles ranking is world no. 37, achieved on 3 April 2006. Her career-high doubles ranking is world no. 62, achieved on 30 January 2006. Domachowska won one doubles title on the WTA tour. Domachowska has won 8 singles and 5 doubles titles on the ITF tour in her career. In the 2008 Australian Open, she achieved her best grand slam result, reaching the fourth round, before she lost to Venus Williams. She announced December 2015 her retirement from professional tennis.
- Natalie Grandin (born 27 February 1981, in East London, South Africa), joined the pro tour in 1999, reaching a career high singles ranking of number 144 in 2005, and a career high doubles ranking of number 22 in 2012. Grandin won one doubles title on the WTA tour. In Grand Slams doubles she reached a Quarterfinals on the 2011 Australian Open. She decided to retire in January 2015 at the age of 33.
- Patricia Mayr-Achleitner (born 8 November 1986 in Rum, Austria), joined the pro tour in 2003. On 4 May 2009, she reached her best singles ranking of world number 70. On 29 September 2014, she peaked at world number 117 in the doubles rankings. Mayr-Achleitner has won 17 singles and seven doubles titles on the ITF tour in her career. She announced that the 2015 Generali Ladies Linz will be her last tournament, stating chronic joint pain as the reason for her retirement from professional tennis.
- Yvonne Meusburger (born 3 October 1983 in Dornbirn, Austria) joined the pro tour in 1999, reaching a career high singles ranking of number 37 in 2014. Meusburger won one singles title on the WTA tour. In Grand Slams, she reached the third round on one occasion, at the 2014 Australian Open. She was an active part on the Austrian Fed Cup team, playing 29 ties between 2003 and 2014. She decided to retire after losing in the first round of US Open in August, In December 2014, Meusburger announced that she would come out of retirement to play one more tournament—the 2015 Australian Open—telling the Austria Press Agency that she wanted to end her career at the tournament because it was the first Grand Slam she contested was the 2006 Australian Open. Meusburger played her final career match against 29th seed Australian Casey Dellacqua at the following 2015 Australian Open.
- Flavia Pennetta (born 25 February 1982, in Brindisi, Italy), turned pro in 2000 on her 18th birthday, reaching a career high singles ranking of number 6 on 28 September 2015 and a career high doubles ranking of number 1 on 28 February 2011. Pennetta is a Grand Slam champion as she won the 2015 US Open title in an all-Italian Grand Slam final against Roberta Vinci, becoming the first woman ever to win her first Grand Slam title after the age of 30 and the first Italian ever to win a singles title at the US Open. As a doubles specialist she also won her first Grand Slam Doubles title at the 2011 Australian Open and reached two other Grand Slam doubles finals at the US Open in 2005 and 2014. In her career she won 11 singles titles (including 2014 Indian Wells), 17 doubles titles and 4 Fed Cup tournaments representing Italy. She announced her retirement at the end of the season following her victory at US Open. Pennetta played her final match at the 2015 WTA Finals.
- Ksenia Pervak (born 27 May 1991, in Chelyabinsk, Russia), turned pro in 2005, reaching a career high singles ranking of number 37 on 19 September 2011 and a career high doubles ranking of number 123 on 30 January 2012. Pervak won one WTA singles title at the 2011 Tashkent Open where she defeated Eva Birnerová in the final. Pervak has also reached the fourth round of the Wimbledon Championships in 2011, where she defeated top ten player Andrea Petkovic in the third round. Pervak has also won 9 ITF singles titles and 3 ITF doubles titles. She announced her retirement from tennis at the end of the season, stating chronic injuries as the reason. She played her last professional match at the 2015 Odlum Brown Vancouver Open and retired at the age of 24.
- (United States) Lisa Raymond (born 10 August 1973, in Norristown, Pennsylvania, USA), turned pro in 1989, reaching a career high singles ranking of number 15 on 20 October 1997 and high doubles ranking of number 1 on 12 June 2000. Raymond has 11 Grand Slam titles to her name: 6 in women's doubles and 5 in mixed doubles. She also won four singles titles on the WTA. Earning more than US$9 million in prize money in her career, Raymond has reached the quarterfinals in singles at the Australian Open and at Wimbledon. She also is one of the few players to win a career Grand Slam in doubles. Among her doubles partners are legends Lindsay Davenport, Martina Navrátilová and Rennae Stubbs, as well as Samantha Stosur, Květa Peschke, Cara Black and Liezel Huber among others. She is also a mixed partner of Mike Bryan, with whom she won the bronze medal at the 2012 Summer Olympics, her lone medal to date. Raymond played her last professional match at the 2015 US Open.
- Chanelle Scheepers (born 13 March 1984, in Harrismith, South Africa), joined the pro tour in 2000, reaching a career high singles ranking of number 37 in 2011, reaching a career high doubles ranking of number 42 in 2014. Scheepers won one singles title and one doubles title on the WTA tour. In Grand Slams singles she reached the 4th round once at the 2010 French Open and in doubles she reached a semifinal on the 2013 Wimbledon Championships. She decided to retire in April 2015 at the age of 31, for coaching Alison Riske.

== Comebacks ==
Following are notable players who will come back after retirements during the 2015 WTA Tour season:

List of Comebacks
- María José Martínez Sánchez (born 12 August 1982 in Murcia, Spain), turned pro in 1998, ultimately winning five singles titles and 16 doubles titles on the WTA Tour. She also won 12 singles and 22 doubles titles on the ITF circuit. She reached a career-high ranking of world number 19 in singles on 10 May 2010, and of world no 5 in doubles on 18 January 2010. Her best singles performance at Grand Slam was reaching the third round, a feat she achieved six times in total and at least once at all four tournaments. In doubles, she reached the semi-finals of a grand slam three times; at the 2010 French Open, the 2012 French Open and the 2012 US Open. She also won the WTA Tour Championships doubles title in 2009, partnering Nuria Llagostera Vives, and reached the semi-finals of the 2009 Tournament of Champions (the first edition of the event to be held). After the pregnancy, she returned to the tour in the doubles of Miami Open in pair with Vera Dushevina.
- (Hungary) Katalin Marosi (born 12 November 1979 in Gheorgheni, Romania), turned professional in October 1995, reaching a career high singles ranking of number 101 in May 2000 and the doubles no. 38 ranking in February 2013. Marosi lost all three WTA doubles finals she reached, but won 15 singles titles and 31 doubles titles on the ITF tour. After two years, she returned to the main tour in the doubles of Katowice Open in pair with Oksana Kalashnikova.
- (Latvia) Anastasija Sevastova (born 13 April 1990 in Liepāja, Latvia), turned professional in 2006 (first retirement in 2013). She is a former world No. 37 in singles. Sevastova won one singles title on the WTA tour. In Grand Slams singles, she reached a fourth round on the 2011 Australian Open. She returned to the tour receiving a wildcard to compete in Sharm-El Sheik, an ITF $10,000 event, starting on January 26.
- (Switzerland) Amra Sadiković (born 6 May 1989 in Prilep, Yugoslavia), turned professional in 2007 (first retirement in 2014). She is a former world No. 179 in singles. Sadiković won eight singles titles and eleven doubles titles on the ITF tour. In Grand Slams singles, she reached a second round of qualification on the 2013 US Open. She returned to the tour receiving a wildcard to compete in Essen, an ITF $25,000 event, starting on June 8.
- (Switzerland) Patty Schnyder (born 14 December 1978 in Basel, Switzerland), turned professional in 1994 (first retirement in 2011), reaching a career high ranking of 7 in 2005 and winning 11 WTA titles. She also made the semi-finals of the 2004 Australian Open and has made the quarter-finals at the French Open and US Open twice each. She will return at an ITF circuit event in Darmstadt where she will play Sofiya Kovalets of Ukraine in the first round.

== Awards ==
List of Awards Winners
Award	Winner	Nationality
Player of the Year	Serena Williams	United States
Doubles Team of the Year	Martina Hingis; Sania Mirza	Switzerland; India
Newcomer of the Year	Daria Gavrilova	Russia
Most Improved Player	Timea Bacsinszky	Switzerland
Most Improved Player	Venus Williams	United States
Karen Krantzcke Sportsmanship Award	Petra Kvitová	Czech Republic
Peachy Kellmeyer Player Service Award	Lucie Šafářová	Czech Republic
Fan Favorite Player	Agnieszka Radwańska	Poland
Fan Favorite WTA Match of the Year	Agnieszka Radwańska def. Garbiñe Muguruza	Poland; Spain
Fan Favorite Grand Slam Match of the Year	Victoria Azarenka def. Angelique Kerber	Belarus; Germany
Fan Favorite Shot of the Year	Agnieszka Radwańska	Poland
Premier Mandatory Tournament of the Year	BNP Paribas Open	United States
Premier 5 Tournament of the Year	Dubai Tennis Championships	United Arab Emirates
International Tournament of the Year (Americas)	Abierto Mexicano Telcel	Mexico
International Tournament of the Year (Asia/Pacific)	ASB Classic	New Zealand
International Tournament of the Year (Europe/Middle East)	Swedish Open	Sweden

== See also ==
- WTA Tour
- 2015 ATP World Tour
- 2015 WTA 125K series
- Women's Tennis Association
- 2015 ITF Women's Circuit
- 2015 Fed Cup
- 2015 WTA Finals
