= 2015 Qatar Total Open =

- Date: 23–28 February
- Edition: 13th
- Category: WTA Premier
- Draw: 28S / 16D
- Prize money: $731,000
- Surface: Hard
- Location: Doha, Qatar
- Venue: Khalifa International Tennis and Squash Complex

Champions

Singles
- (Czech Republic) Lucie Šafářová

Doubles
- (United States) Raquel Kops-Jones / (United States) Abigail Spears
← 2014 ·	Qatar Total Open	· 2016 →

The 2015 Qatar Total Open was a professional women's tennis tournament played on hard courts. It was the 13th edition of the event and part of the WTA Premier series of the 2015 WTA Tour. It took place at the International Tennis and Squash Complex in Doha, Qatar from 23 February to 28 February.

== Points and prize money ==
=== Point distribution ===
Event	W	F	SF	QF	Round of 16	Round of 32	Q	Q3	Q2	Q1
Singles	470	305	185	100	55	1	25	18	13	1
Doubles	470	305	185	100	1	—	—	—	—	—

=== Prize money ===
Event	W	F	SF	QF	Round of 16	Round of 32	Q	Q3	Q2	Q1
Singles	$124,000	$66,000	$35,455	$19,050	$10,220	$5,580	$2,920	$2,900	$1,555	$860
Doubles*	$39,000	$20,650	$11,360	$5,875	$3,140	—	—	—	—	—

_{*per team}

== Singles main-draw entrants ==
=== Seeds ===
Country	Player	Rank^{1}	Seed
CZE	Petra Kvitová	3	1
~~ROU~~	~~Simona Halep~~	~~4~~	~~2~~
DEN	Caroline Wozniacki	5	3
POL	Agnieszka Radwańska	8	4
RUS	Ekaterina Makarova	9	5
GER	Andrea Petkovic	10	6
USA	Venus Williams	11	7
GER	Angelique Kerber	12	8
ESP	Carla Suárez Navarro	13	9

- ^{1} Rankings as of February 16, 2015.

=== Other entrants ===
The following players received wildcards into the singles main draw:

- (Belarus) Victoria Azarenka
- (Tunisia) Ons Jabeur
- (Denmark) Caroline Wozniacki

The following players received entry from the qualifying draw:

- (Romania) Alexandra Dulgheru
- (Belgium) Kirsten Flipkens
- (Russia) Daria Gavrilova
- (Switzerland) Stefanie Vögele

The following player received entry as a lucky loser:

- (China) Zheng Saisai

=== Withdrawals ===
Before the tournament

- (Slovakia) Dominika Cibulková → replaced by (Germany) Sabine Lisicki
- (Romania) Simona Halep (right rib injury) → replaced by (China) Zheng Saisai
- (China) Peng Shuai → replaced by (Australia) Casey Dellacqua

=== Retirements ===
- (Romania) Alexandra Dulgheru (upper respiratory tract infection)
- (Serbia) Jelena Janković (right hip injury)
- (Spain) Garbiñe Muguruza (viral illness)

== Doubles main-draw entrants ==
=== Seeds ===
Country	Player	Country	Player	Rank^{1}	Seed
TPE	Hsieh Su-wei	IND	Sania Mirza	11	1
RUS	Ekaterina Makarova	RUS	Elena Vesnina	16	2
SUI	Martina Hingis	ITA	Flavia Pennetta	17	3
USA	Raquel Kops-Jones	USA	Abigail Spears	22	4

- ^{1} Rankings as of February 16, 2015.

=== Other entrants ===
The following pairs received wildcards into the doubles main draw:

- (Oman) Fatma Al-Nabhani / (China) Zheng Saisai
- (Belarus) Victoria Azarenka / (Belgium) Kirsten Flipkens

The following pairs received entry as alternates:

- (Ukraine) Yuliya Beygelzimer / (Ukraine) Olga Savchuk
- (Australia) Jarmila Gajdošová / (Germany) Andrea Petkovic
- (Croatia) Darija Jurak / (Czech Republic) Klára Koukalová

=== Withdrawals ===
Before the tournament

- (France) Kristina Mladenovic (viral infection)
- (Spain) Garbiñe Muguruza (viral illness)
- (Czech Republic) Karolína Plíšková (viral illness)

During the tournament

- (Belgium) Kirsten Flipkens (viral illness)

== Champions ==
=== Singles ===
- (Czech Republic) Lucie Šafářová def. (Belarus) Victoria Azarenka, 6–4, 6–3

=== Doubles ===
- (United States) Raquel Kops-Jones / (United States) Abigail Spears def. (Chinese Taipei) Hsieh Su-wei / (India) Sania Mirza, 6–4, 6–4
