= 2015 Bank of the West Classic =

- Date: 3–9 August
- Edition: 44th
- Category: WTA Premier
- Draw: 28S / 16D
- Prize money: $731,000
- Surface: Hard
- Location: Stanford, California, United States

Champions

Singles
- (Germany) Angelique Kerber

Doubles
- (China) Xu Yifan / (China) Zheng Saisai
- Stanford Classic

The 2015 Bank of the West Classic was a professional tennis tournament played on hard courts. It was the 44th edition of the tournament, which was part of the WTA Premier tournaments of the 2015 WTA Tour, making it the longest-running women's only tennis tournament. It took place in Stanford, California, United States between 3 and 9 August 2015. It was the first women's event on the 2015 US Open Series.

== Points and prize money ==
=== Point distribution ===
Event	W	F	SF	QF	Round of 16	Round of 32	Round of 64	Q	Q2	Q1
Women's singles	470	305	185	100	55	30	1	25	13	1
Women's doubles	470	305	185	100	1	—N/a	—N/a	—N/a	—N/a	—N/a

=== Prize money ===
Event	W	F	SF	QF	Round of 16	Round of 32	Q2	Q1
Women's singles	$124,000	$66,000	$35,455	$19,050	$10,220	$5,580	$2,920	$1,555
Women's doubles	$39,000	$20,650	$11,360	$5,875	$3,140	—N/a	—N/a	—N/a

== Singles main-draw entrants ==
=== Seeds ===
Country	Player	Rank^{1}	Seed
DEN	Caroline Wozniacki	5	1
POL	Agnieszka Radwańska	7	2
ESP	Carla Suárez Navarro	10	3
CZE	Karolína Plíšková	12	4
GER	Angelique Kerber	13	5
GER	Andrea Petkovic	16	6
USA	Madison Keys	18	7
UKR	Elina Svitolina	20	8

- ^{1} Rankings are as of July 27, 2015.

=== Other entrants ===
The following players received wildcards into the singles main draw:

- (United States) Catherine Bellis
- (Poland) Agnieszka Radwańska
- (Denmark) Caroline Wozniacki
- (Canada) Carol Zhao

The following players received entry from the qualifying draw:

- (Ukraine) Kateryna Bondarenko
- (Japan) Kimiko Date-Krumm
- (Japan) Misaki Doi
- (United States) Nicole Gibbs

=== Withdrawals ===
Before the tournament

- (Spain) Garbiñe Muguruza → replaced by (Germany) Tatjana Maria
- (Czech Republic) Kateřina Siniaková → replaced by (Croatia) Ajla Tomljanović
- (United States) Serena Williams → replaced by (Serbia) Aleksandra Krunić

== Doubles main-draw entrants ==
=== Seeds ===
Country	Player	Country	Player	Rank^{1}	Seed
TPE	Chan Hao-ching	TPE	Chan Yung-jan	55	1
ESP	Anabel Medina Garrigues	ESP	Arantxa Parra Santonja	66	2
CAN	Gabriela Dabrowski	POL	Alicja Rosolska	84	3
USA	Raquel Kops-Jones	USA	Maria Sanchez	94	4

- ^{1} Rankings are as of July 27, 2015.

=== Other entrants ===
The following pair received wildcards into the main draw:

- (United States) Catherine Bellis / (United States) Jacqueline Cako

== Finals ==
=== Singles ===
- (Germany) Angelique Kerber defeated (Czech Republic) Karolína Plíšková, 6–3, 5–7, 6–4

=== Doubles ===
- (China) Xu Yifan / (China) Zheng Saisai defeated (Spain) Anabel Medina Garrigues / (Spain) Arantxa Parra Santonja, 6–1, 6–3
