= 2015 Bank of the West Classic – Singles =

Singles
- 2015 Bank of the West Classic

Final
- Champion: (Germany) Angelique Kerber
- Runner-up: (Czech Republic) Karolína Plíšková
- Score: 6–3, 5–7, 6–4

Details
- Draw: 28
- Seeds: 8

Events
| Singles | Doubles |
- Bank of the West Classic

Serena Williams was the defending champion, but withdrew due to an elbow injury.

Angelique Kerber won the title, defeating Karolína Plíšková in the final, 6–3, 5–7, 6–4.

== Seeds ==
The top four seeds received a bye into the second round.

1. (Denmark) Caroline Wozniacki (second round)
2. (Poland) Agnieszka Radwańska (quarterfinals)
3. (Spain) Carla Suárez Navarro (second round)
4. (Czech Republic) Karolína Plíšková (final)
5. (Germany) Angelique Kerber (champion)
6. (Germany) Andrea Petkovic (second round)
7. (United States) Madison Keys (second round)
8. (Ukraine) Elina Svitolina (semifinals)

== Draw ==
Key

- Q = Qualifier
- WC = Wild card
- LL = Lucky loser
- Alt = Alternate
- ITF = ITF entry
- PR = Protected ranking
- SR = Special ranking
- SE = Special exempt
- JE = Junior exempt
- JR = Junior Accelerator Programme entrant
- CO = College Accelerator Programme entrant
- NG = Next Gen Accelerator Program entrant
- w/o = Walkover
- r = Retired
- d = Defaulted

=== Finals ===
Semifinals
(United States) Varvara Lepchenko | 2 | 5
4 | (Czech Republic) Karolína Plíšková | 6 | 7
8 | (Ukraine) Elina Svitolina | 3 | 1
5 | (Germany) Angelique Kerber | 6 | 6

Final
4 | (Czech Republic) Karolína Plíšková | 3 | 7 | 4
5 | (Germany) Angelique Kerber | 6 | 5 | 6

=== Top half ===
First round
(Croatia) M Lučić-Baroni | 6 | 2 | 6^{4}
(United States) V Lepchenko | 3 | 6 | 7^{7}
(Germany) M Barthel | 6 | 6
WC | (Canada) C Zhao | 3 | 0
(Germany) C Witthöft | 7 | 1 | 3
6 | (Germany) A Petkovic | 5 | 6 | 6
Q | (Japan) K Date-Krumm | 1 | 7^{7} | 6
(Germany) S Lisicki | 6 | 6^{4} | 2
(Russia) V Diatchenko | 6 | 0 | 0
(Croatia) A Tomljanović | 3 | 6 | 6
(Serbia) A Krunić | 3 | 0
7 | (United States) M Keys | 6 | 6

Second round
1/WC | (Denmark) C Wozniacki | 4 | 2
(United States) V Lepchenko | 6 | 6
(Germany) M Barthel | 5 | 6 | 7^{7}
6 | (Germany) A Petkovic | 7 | 2 | 6^{4}
4 | (Czech Republic) Ka Plíšková | 7 | 6
Q | (Japan) K Date-Krumm | 5 | 2
(Croatia) A Tomljanović | 1 | 6 | 6
7 | (United States) M Keys | 6 | 4 | 1

Quarterfinals
(United States) V Lepchenko | 6^{3} | 6 | 6
(Germany) M Barthel | 7^{7} | 2 | 3
4 | (Czech Republic) Ka Plíšková | 6 | 6
(Croatia) A Tomljanović | 2 | 4

Semifinals
(United States) V Lepchenko | 2 | 5
4 | (Czech Republic) Ka Plíšková | 6 | 7

=== Bottom half ===
First round
8 | (Ukraine) E Svitolina | 4 | 6 | 7
Q | (Ukraine) K Bondarenko | 6 | 4 | 5
(France) C Garcia | 4 | 5
Q | (United States) N Gibbs | 6 | 7
(United States) A Riske | 6 | 5 | 6
(Germany) T Maria | 2 | 7 | 1
5 | (Germany) A Kerber | 6 | 6
(Russia) D Gavrilova | 1 | 3
(China) S Zheng | 3 | 4
(Croatia) A Konjuh | 6 | 6
Q | (Japan) M Doi | 6 | 7^{7}
WC | (United States) C Bellis | 3 | 6^{3}

Second round
8 | (Ukraine) E Svitolina | 6 | 7^{7}
Q | (United States) N Gibbs | 3 | 6^{5}
(United States) A Riske | 6 | 6
3 | (Spain) C Suárez Navarro | 4 | 4
5 | (Germany) A Kerber | 6 | 6
(Croatia) A Konjuh | 4 | 3
Q | (Japan) M Doi | 6 | 2 | 0
2/WC | (Poland) A Radwańska | 1 | 6 | 6

Quarterfinals
8 | (Ukraine) E Svitolina | 4 | 7 | 6
(United States) A Riske | 6 | 5 | 1
5 | (Germany) A Kerber | 4 | 6 | 6
2/WC | (Poland) A Radwańska | 6 | 4 | 4

Semifinals
8 | (Ukraine) E Svitolina | 3 | 1
5 | (Germany) A Kerber | 6 | 6

== Qualifying ==
=== Seeds ===
1. (Japan) Misaki Doi (qualified)
2. (Ukraine) Kateryna Bondarenko (qualified)
3. (United States) Sachia Vickery (first round)
4. (United States) Anna Tatishvili (qualifying competition)
5. (United States) Nicole Gibbs (qualified)
6. (Croatia) Petra Martić (qualifying competition)
7. (Japan) Naomi Osaka (first round)
8. (United States) Maria Sanchez (first round)

=== Qualifiers ===
1. (Japan) Misaki Doi
2. (Ukraine) Kateryna Bondarenko
3. (Japan) Kimiko Date-Krumm
4. (United States) Nicole Gibbs

=== Draw ===
==== First qualifier ====
First round
1 | (Japan) Misaki Doi | 6 | 7^{7}
(China) Xu Yifan | 3 | 6^{3}
(United States) Julia Boserup | 4 | 7 | 6
8 | (United States) Maria Sanchez | 6 | 5 | 2

Qualifying competition
1 | (Japan) Misaki Doi | 2 | 6 | 6
(United States) Julia Boserup | 6 | 3 | 4

==== Second qualifier ====
First round
2 | (Ukraine) Kateryna Bondarenko | 6 | 6
WC | (United States) Caroline Doyle | 0 | 0
(United States) Jessica Pegula | 7^{8} | 4 | 6^{9}
6 | (Croatia) Petra Martić | 6^{6} | 6 | 7^{11}

Qualifying competition
2 | (Ukraine) Kateryna Bondarenko | 6 | 3 | 6
6 | (Croatia) Petra Martić | 3 | 6 | 3

==== Third qualifier ====
First round
3 | (United States) Sachia Vickery | 2 | 4
(Canada) Gabriela Dabrowski | 6 | 6
(Japan) Kimiko Date-Krumm | 6^{3} | 6 | 6
7 | (Japan) Naomi Osaka | 7^{7} | 4 | 3

Qualifying competition
(Canada) Gabriela Dabrowski | 4 | 1
(Japan) Kimiko Date-Krumm | 6 | 6

==== Fourth qualifier ====
First round
4 | (United States) Anna Tatishvili | 5 | 6 | 6
(Chinese Taipei) Chan Yung-jan | 7 | 4 | 0
WC | (United States) Taylor Davidson | 0 | 2
5 | (United States) Nicole Gibbs | 6 | 6

Qualifying competition
4 | (United States) Anna Tatishvili | 6 | 3 | 5
5 | (United States) Nicole Gibbs | 2 | 6 | 7
