= 2015 Qatar Total Open – Singles =

Singles
- 2015 Qatar Total Open

Final
- Champion: (Czech Republic) Lucie Šafářová
- Runner-up: (Belarus) Victoria Azarenka
- Score: 6–4, 6–3

Details
- Draw: 28 (4 Q / 2 WC )
- Seeds: 8

Events
Singles	Doubles
- Qatar Total Open

Lucie Šafářová defeated Victoria Azarenka in the final, 6–4, 6–3 to win the singles tennis title at the 2015 WTA Qatar Open.

Simona Halep was the reigning champion, but withdrew before the tournament.

== Seeds ==
The top four seeds received a bye into the second round.

1. (Czech Republic) Petra Kvitová (quarterfinals)
2. (Romania) Simona Halep (withdrew)
3. (Denmark) Caroline Wozniacki (quarterfinals)
4. (Poland) Agnieszka Radwańska (quarterfinals)
5. (Russia) Ekaterina Makarova (second round)
6. (Germany) Andrea Petkovic (quarterfinals)
7. (United States) Venus Williams (semifinals)
8. (Germany) Angelique Kerber (first round)
9. (Spain) Carla Suárez Navarro (semifinals)

== Draw ==
Key

- Q = Qualifier
- WC = Wild card
- LL = Lucky loser
- Alt = Alternate
- ITF = ITF entry
- PR = Protected ranking
- SR = Special ranking
- SE = Special exempt
- JE = Junior exempt
- JR = Junior Accelerator Programme entrant
- CO = College Accelerator Programme entrant
- NG = Next Gen Accelerator Program entrant
- w/o = Walkover
- r = Retired
- d = Defaulted

=== Finals ===
Semifinals
9	(Spain) Carla Suárez Navarro	3	2
(Czech Republic) Lucie Šafářová	6	6
7	(United States) Venus Williams	6	2	4
WC	(Belarus) Victoria Azarenka	2	6	6

Final
(Czech Republic) Lucie Šafářová	6	6
WC	(Belarus) Victoria Azarenka	4	3

=== Top half ===
First round
LL	(China) S Zheng	0	2
(Serbia) J Janković	6	6
(Czech Republic) Ka Plíšková	7^{7}	6
Q	(Switzerland) S Vögele	6^{4}	4
(Spain) G Muguruza	5^{r}
9	(Spain) C Suárez Navarro	6
(Czech Republic) L Šafářová	7^{7}	6
(Australia) S Stosur	6^{3}	4
WC	(Tunisia) O Jabeur	3	2
(Kazakhstan) Z Diyas	6	6
Q	(Belgium) K Flipkens	7^{7}	3	2
6	(Germany) A Petkovic	6^{5}	6	6

Second round
1	(Czech Republic) P Kvitová	6	1
(Serbia) J Janković	3	1^{r}
(Czech Republic) Ka Plíšková	6^{2}	4
9	(Spain) C Suárez Navarro	7^{7}	6
5	(Russia) E Makarova	2	7^{7}	3
(Czech Republic) L Šafářová	6	6^{5}	6
(Kazakhstan) Z Diyas	7	2	4
6	(Germany) A Petkovic	5	6	6

Quarterfinals
1	(Czech Republic) P Kvitová	6	0	3
9	(Spain) C Suárez Navarro	3	6	6
(Czech Republic) L Šafářová	6	6
6	(Germany) A Petkovic	2	1

Semifinals
9	(Spain) C Suárez Navarro	3	2
(Czech Republic) L Šafářová	6	6

=== Bottom half ===
First round
7	(United States) V Williams	3	6	6
(Australia) C Dellacqua	6	2	1
(Czech Republic) B Záhlavová-Strýcová	7	6
(Germany) S Lisicki	5	4
(Russia) S Kuznetsova	6	4	2
(Italy) F Pennetta	3	6	6
8	(Germany) A Kerber	0	3
WC	(Belarus) V Azarenka	6	6
Q	(Russia) D Gavrilova	4	7	4
(Ukraine) E Svitolina	6	5	6
Q	(Romania) A Dulgheru	6	3	6
(France) A Cornet	4	6	1

Second round
7	(United States) V Williams	7	3	7^{7}
(Czech Republic) B Záhlavová-Strýcová	5	6	6^{5}
(Italy) F Pennetta	1	1
4	(Poland) A Radwańska	6	6
WC	(Belarus) V Azarenka	6	6^{4}	6
(Ukraine) E Svitolina	3	7^{7}	1
Q	(Romania) A Dulgheru	1	0^{r}
3/WC	(Denmark) C Wozniacki	6	3

Quarterfinals
7	(United States) V Williams	6	1	6
4	(Poland) A Radwańska	4	6	3
WC	(Belarus) V Azarenka	6	6
3/WC	(Denmark) C Wozniacki	3	1

Semifinals
7	(United States) V Williams	6	2	4
WC	(Belarus) V Azarenka	2	6	6

== Qualifying ==
=== Seeds ===
1. (Switzerland) Belinda Bencic (first round)
2. (Germany) Mona Barthel (first round)
3. (United Kingdom) Heather Watson (second round)
4. (Czech Republic) Klára Koukalová (first round)
5. (Australia) Jarmila Gajdošová (second round)
6. (Belgium) Kirsten Flipkens (qualified)
7. (Serbia) Bojana Jovanovski (first round)
8. (Germany) Julia Görges (withdrew)

=== Qualifiers ===
1. (Switzerland) Stefanie Vögele
2. (Belgium) Kirsten Flipkens
3. (Romania) Alexandra Dulgheru
4. (Russia) Daria Gavrilova

=== Lucky loser ===
1. (China) Zheng Saisai

=== Draw ===
==== First qualifier ====
First round
1	(Switzerland) Belinda Bencic	7^{7}	2	2
(Italy) Francesca Schiavone	6^{4}	6	6
(Switzerland) Stefanie Vögele	6	6
(Ukraine) Yuliya Beygelzimer	3	4
(Russia) Elizaveta Kulichkova	4	6	4
(Australia) Anastasia Rodionova	6	4	6
(Kazakhstan) Yulia Putintseva	6	6
7	(Serbia) Bojana Jovanovski	4	4

Second round
(Italy) Francesca Schiavone	2	3
(Switzerland) Stefanie Vögele	6	6
(Australia) Anastasia Rodionova	4	4
(Kazakhstan) Yulia Putintseva	6	6

Qualifying competition
(Switzerland) Stefanie Vögele	6	3	6
(Kazakhstan) Yulia Putintseva	3	6	4

==== Second qualifier ====
First round
2	(Germany) Mona Barthel	2	2
(Ukraine) Kateryna Kozlova	6	6
(New Zealand) Marina Erakovic	3	0^{r}
(Hungary) Tímea Babos	6	3
(China) Wang Qiang	6	6
(Germany) Annika Beck	1	0
WC	(Oman) Fatma Al-Nabhani	0	3
6/WC	(Belgium) Kirsten Flipkens	6	6

Second round
(Ukraine) Kateryna Kozlova	6	6
(Hungary) Tímea Babos	2	4
(China) Wang Qiang	4	3
6/WC	(Belgium) Kirsten Flipkens	6	6

Qualifying competition
(Ukraine) Kateryna Kozlova	3	4
6/WC	(Belgium) Kirsten Flipkens	6	6

==== Third qualifier ====
First round
3	(United Kingdom) Heather Watson	6	6
WC	(Qatar) Olla Mourad	1	0
(Chinese Taipei) Chan Yung-jan	0	0^{r}
(China) Zheng Saisai	6	0
(Romania) Alexandra Dulgheru	6	6
(Canada) Gabriela Dabrowski	2	2
(Luxembourg) Mandy Minella	6^{4}	1
5	(Australia) Jarmila Gajdošová	7^{7}	6

Second round
3	(United Kingdom) Heather Watson	3	3
(China) Zheng Saisai	6	6
(Romania) Alexandra Dulgheru	4	6	6
5	(Australia) Jarmila Gajdošová	6	3	3

Qualifying competition
(China) Zheng Saisai	1	0
(Romania) Alexandra Dulgheru	6	6

==== Fourth qualifier ====
First round
4	(Czech Republic) Klára Koukalová	0	2
(Chinese Taipei) Hsieh Su-wei	6	6
(Israel) Shahar Pe'er	6	3
(Russia) Elena Vesnina	4	0^{r}
(Russia) Daria Gavrilova	3	6	6
(Russia) Alla Kudryavtseva	6	1	4
WC	(France) Kristina Mladenovic	6^{4}	0
Alt	(Ukraine) Olga Savchuk	7^{7}	6

Second round
(Chinese Taipei) Hsieh Su-wei	4	6	6
(Israel) Shahar Pe'er	6	2	1
(Russia) Daria Gavrilova	6	3	6
Alt	(Ukraine) Olga Savchuk	2	6	2

Qualifying competition
(Chinese Taipei) Hsieh Su-wei	6	3	4
(Russia) Daria Gavrilova	1	6	6
