= 2015 Bank of the West Classic – Doubles =

Doubles
- 2015 Bank of the West Classic

Final
- Champions: (China) Xu Yifan (China) Zheng Saisai
- Runners-up: (Spain) Anabel Medina Garrigues (Spain) Arantxa Parra Santonja
- Score: 6–1, 6–3

Details
- Draw: 16
- Seeds: 8

Events
Singles	Doubles
← 2014 ·	Bank of the West Classic	· 2016 →

Garbiñe Muguruza and Carla Suárez Navarro were the defending champions, but chose not to participate this year.

Xu Yifan and Zheng Saisai won the title, defeating Anabel Medina Garrigues and Arantxa Parra Santonja in the final, 6–1, 6–3.

== Seeds ==
1. (Chinese Taipei) Chan Hao-ching / (Chinese Taipei) Chan Yung-jan (second round)
2. (Spain) Anabel Medina Garrigues / (Spain) Arantxa Parra Santonja (final)
3. (Canada) Gabriela Dabrowski / (Poland) Alicja Rosolska (semifinals)
4. (United States) Raquel Kops-Jones / (United States) Maria Sanchez (first round)

== Draw ==
=== Key ===
- Q = Qualifier
- WC = Wild card
- LL = Lucky loser
- Alt = Alternate
- SE = Special exempt
- PR = Protected ranking
- ITF = ITF entry
- JE = Junior exempt
- w/o = Walkover
- r = Retired
- d = Defaulted
- SR = Special ranking

=== Draw ===
First round
1	(Chinese Taipei) H-c Chan (Chinese Taipei) Y-j Chan	6	6
(Japan) K Date-Krumm (Luxembourg) M Minella	1	3
(Ukraine) K Bondarenko (Germany) T Maria	7^{8}	6
(Czech Republic) E Hrdinová (Croatia) P Martić	6^{6}	3
4	(United States) R Kops-Jones (United States) M Sanchez	3	6^{2}
(Germany) M Barthel (Germany) S Lisicki	6	7^{7}
(Poland) K Jans-Ignacik (Croatia) M Lučić-Baroni	4	6	[4]
(China) Y Xu (China) S Zheng	6	3	[10]
(United States) A Muhammad (Croatia) A Tomljanović	6^{8}	7^{7}	[11]
(Argentina) M Irigoyen (Poland) P Kania	7^{10}	6^{1}	[9]
(Serbia) A Krunić (Germany) A Petkovic	6	6^{4}	[10]
3	(Canada) G Dabrowski (Poland) A Rosolska	4	7^{7}	[12]
(Chinese Taipei) C-w Chan (Croatia) D Jurak	6	7
(Russia) V Diatchenko (United States) A Tatishvili	4	5
WC	(United States) C Bellis (United States) J Cako	4	6^{4}
2	(Spain) A Medina Garrigues (Spain) A Parra Santonja	6	7^{7}

Quarterfinals
1	(Chinese Taipei) H-c Chan (Chinese Taipei) Y-j Chan	6	2	[7]
(Ukraine) K Bondarenko (Germany) T Maria	0	6	[10]
(Germany) M Barthel (Germany) S Lisicki	6	4	[5]
(China) Y Xu (China) S Zheng	3	6	[10]
(United States) A Muhammad (Croatia) A Tomljanović	4	2
3	(Canada) G Dabrowski (Poland) A Rosolska	6	6
(Chinese Taipei) C-w Chan (Croatia) D Jurak	3	5
2	(Spain) A Medina Garrigues (Spain) A Parra Santonja	6	7

Semifinals
(Ukraine) K Bondarenko (Germany) T Maria	2	4
(China) Y Xu (China) S Zheng	6	6
3	(Canada) G Dabrowski (Poland) A Rosolska	3	2
2	(Spain) A Medina Garrigues (Spain) A Parra Santonja	6	6

Final
(China) Y Xu (China) S Zheng	6	6
2	(Spain) A Medina Garrigues (Spain) A Parra Santonja	1	3
