= 2015 Qatar Total Open – Doubles =

Doubles
- 2015 Qatar Total Open

Final
- Champions: (United States) Raquel Kops-Jones (United States) Abigail Spears
- Runners-up: (Chinese Taipei) Hsieh Su-wei (India) Sania Mirza
- Score: 6–4, 6–4

Events
| Singles | Doubles |
| ← 2014 · | Qatar Total Open | · 2016 → |

Hsieh Su-wei and Peng Shuai were the defending champions, but Peng decided not to compete this year. Hsieh played alongside Sania Mirza, but lost in the final to Raquel Kops-Jones and Abigail Spears, 4–6, 4–6.

== Seeds ==
1. (Chinese Taipei) Hsieh Su-wei / (India) Sania Mirza (final)
2. (Russia) Ekaterina Makarova / (Russia) Elena Vesnina (semifinals)
3. (Switzerland) Martina Hingis / (Italy) Flavia Pennetta (first round)
4. (United States) Raquel Kops-Jones / (United States) Abigail Spears (champions)

== Draw ==
=== Key ===
- Q = Qualifier
- WC = Wild card
- LL = Lucky loser
- Alt = Alternate
- SE = Special exempt
- PR = Protected ranking
- ITF = ITF entry
- JE = Junior exempt
- w/o = Walkover
- r = Retired
- d = Defaulted
- SR = Special ranking

=== Draw ===
First round
1 | (Chinese Taipei) S-w Hsieh (India) S Mirza | 6 | 6
(Spain) A Medina Garrigues (Spain) A Parra Santonja | 2 | 1
(Germany) J Görges (Germany) A-L Grönefeld | 1 | 4
(Netherlands) M Krajicek (Czech Republic) B Záhlavová-Strýcová | 6 | 6
3 | (Switzerland) M Hingis (Italy) F Pennetta | 6^{5} | 4
(Chinese Taipei) H-c Chan (Australia) C Dellacqua | 7^{7} | 6
Alt | (Ukraine) Y Beygelzimer (Ukraine) O Savchuk | 6 | 2 | [8]
(Canada) G Dabrowski (New Zealand) M Erakovic | 4 | 6 | [10]
WC | (Belarus) V Azarenka (Belgium) K Flipkens | 6 | 6
WC | (Oman) F Al-Nabhani (China) S Zheng | 3 | 4
(Slovenia) A Klepač (Australia) An Rodionova | 6^{2} | 4
4 | (United States) R Kops-Jones (United States) A Spears | 7^{7} | 6
Alt | (Australia) J Gajdošová (Germany) A Petkovic | 5 | 6^{5}
(Russia) A Kudryavtseva (Slovenia) K Srebotnik | 7 | 7^{7}
Alt | (Croatia) D Jurak (Czech Republic) K Koukalová | 1 | 4
2 | (Russia) E Makarova (Russia) E Vesnina | 6 | 6

Quarterfinals
1 | (Chinese Taipei) S-w Hsieh (India) S Mirza | 6 | 6
(Netherlands) M Krajicek (Czech Republic) B Záhlavová-Strýcová | 0 | 1
(Chinese Taipei) H-c Chan (Australia) C Dellacqua | 6 | 6
(Canada) G Dabrowski (New Zealand) M Erakovic | 3 | 2
WC | (Belarus) V Azarenka (Belgium) K Flipkens
4 | (United States) R Kops-Jones (United States) A Spears | w/o
(Russia) A Kudryavtseva (Slovenia) K Srebotnik | 3 | 6 | [11]
2 | (Russia) E Makarova (Russia) E Vesnina | 6 | 3 | [13]

Semifinals
1 | (Chinese Taipei) S-w Hsieh (India) S Mirza | 6 | 6
(Chinese Taipei) H-c Chan (Australia) C Dellacqua | 2 | 4
4 | (United States) R Kops-Jones (United States) A Spears | 6 | 6
2 | (Russia) E Makarova (Russia) E Vesnina | 4 | 1

Final
1 | (Chinese Taipei) S-w Hsieh (India) S Mirza | 4 | 4
4 | (United States) R Kops-Jones (United States) A Spears | 6 | 6
