= 2015 in tennis =

This page covers all the important events in the sport of tennis in 2015. Primarily, it provides the results of notable tournaments throughout the year on both the ATP and WTA Tours, the Davis Cup, and the Fed Cup.

== ITF ==
=== Grand Slam events ===
Category	Championship	Champion	Finalist	Score in the final
Men's singles	Australian Open	(Serbia) Novak Djokovic	(United Kingdom) Andy Murray	7–6^{(7–5)}, 6–7^{(4–7)}, 6–3, 6–0
Men's singles	French Open	(Switzerland) Stan Wawrinka	(Serbia) Novak Djokovic	4–6, 6–4, 6–3, 6–4
Men's singles	Wimbledon	(Serbia) Novak Djokovic	(Switzerland) Roger Federer	7–6^{(7–1)}, 6–7^{(10–12)}, 6–4, 6–3
Men's singles	US Open	(Serbia) Novak Djokovic	(Switzerland) Roger Federer	6–4, 5–7, 6-4, 6-4

Category	Championship	Champion	Finalist	Score in the final
Women's singles	Australian Open	(United States) Serena Williams	(Russia) Maria Sharapova	6–3, 7-6^{(7–5)}
Women's singles	French Open	(United States) Serena Williams	(Czech Republic) Lucie Šafářová	6–3, 6–7^{(2–7)}, 6–2
Women's singles	Wimbledon	(United States) Serena Williams	(Spain) Garbiñe Muguruza	6–4, 6–4
Women's singles	US Open	(Italy) Flavia Pennetta	(Italy) Roberta Vinci	7-6^{(7–4)}, 6-2

Category	Championship	Champions	Finalists	Score in the final
Men's Doubles	Australian Open	(Italy) Simone Bolelli (Italy) Fabio Fognini	(France) Pierre-Hugues Herbert (France) Nicolas Mahut	6–4, 6–4
Men's Doubles	French Open	(Croatia) Ivan Dodig (Brazil) Marcelo Melo	(United States) Bob Bryan (United States) Mike Bryan	6–7^{(5–7)}, 7–6^{(7–5)}, 7–5
Men's Doubles	Wimbledon	(Netherlands) Jean-Julien Rojer (Romania) Horia Tecău	(United Kingdom) Jamie Murray (Australia) John Peers	7-6^{(7–5)}, 6–4, 6–4
Men's Doubles	US Open	(France) Pierre-Hugues Herbert (France) Nicolas Mahut	(United Kingdom) Jamie Murray (Australia) John Peers	6-4, 6-4

Category	Championship	Champions	Finalists	Score in the final
Women's Doubles	Australian Open	(United States) Bethanie Mattek-Sands (Czech Republic) Lucie Šafářová	(Chinese Taipei) Chan Yung-jan (China) Zheng Jie	6–4, 7–6^{(7–5)}
Women's Doubles	French Open	(United States) Bethanie Mattek-Sands (Czech Republic) Lucie Šafářová	(Australia) Casey Dellacqua (Kazakhstan) Yaroslava Shvedova	3–6, 6–4, 6–2
Women's Doubles	Wimbledon	(Switzerland) Martina Hingis (India) Sania Mirza	(Russia) Ekaterina Makarova (Russia) Elena Vesnina	5–7, 7–6^{(7–4)}, 7–5
Women's Doubles	US Open	(Switzerland) Martina Hingis (India) Sania Mirza	(Australia) Casey Dellacqua (Kazakhstan) Yaroslava Shvedova	6-3, 6-3

Category	Championship	Champions	Finalists	Score in the final
Mixed Doubles	Australian Open	(Switzerland) Martina Hingis (India) Leander Paes	(France) Kristina Mladenovic (Canada) Daniel Nestor	6–4, 6–3
Mixed Doubles	French Open	(United States) Bethanie Mattek-Sands (United States) Mike Bryan	(Czech Republic) Lucie Hradecká (Poland) Marcin Matkowski	7–6^{(7–3)}, 6–1
Mixed Doubles	Wimbledon	(India) Leander Paes (Switzerland) Martina Hingis	(Austria) Alexander Peya (Hungary) Tímea Babos	6–1, 6–1
Mixed Doubles	US Open	(India) Leander Paes (Switzerland) Martina Hingis	(United States) Bethanie Mattek-Sands (United States) Sam Querrey	6–4, 3-6, [10-7]

=== Davis Cup ===
First round 6–8 March
Frankfurt, Germany (indoor hard)
1	France	3
Germany	2
Glasgow, Great Britain (indoor hard)
7	United States	2
Great Britain	3
Ostrava, Czech Republic (indoor hard)
3	Czech Republic	2
Australia	3
Astana, Kazakhstan (indoor hard)
6	Italy	2
Kazakhstan	3
Buenos Aires, Argentina (clay)
Brazil	2
5	Argentina	3
Kraljevo, Serbia (indoor hard)
Croatia	0
4	Serbia	5
Vancouver, Canada (indoor hard)
Japan	2
8	Canada	3
Liège, Belgium (indoor hard)
Belgium	3
2	Switzerland	2

Quarterfinals; 17–19 July
London, Great Britain (grass)
1	France	1
Great Britain	3
Darwin, Australia (grass)
Australia	3
Kazakhstan	2
Buenos Aires, Argentina (indoor clay)
5	Argentina	4
4	Serbia	1
Middelkerke, Belgium (clay)
8	Canada	0
Belgium	5

Semifinals; 18–20 September
Glasgow, Great Britain (indoor hard)
Great Britain	3
Australia	2
Brussels, Belgium (indoor hard)
5	Argentina	2
Belgium	3

Final; 27–29 November
Ghent, Belgium (indoor clay)
Great Britain	3
Belgium	1

=== Fed Cup ===
Quarterfinals; 7–8 February
Quebec City, Canada (indoor hard)
1	Czech Republic	4
Canada	0
Genoa, Italy (indoor clay)
France	3
3	Italy	2
Kraków, Poland (indoor hard)
4	Russia	4
Poland	0
Stuttgart, Germany (indoor hard)
Australia	1
2	Germany	4

Semifinals; 18–19 April
Ostrava, Czech Republic (indoor hard)
1	Czech Republic	3
France	1
Sochi, Russia (indoor clay)
4	Russia	3
2	Germany	2

Final; 14–15 November
Prague, Czech Republic (indoor hard)
1	Czech Republic	3
4	Russia	2

== IOC ==
- June 6-14: Southeast Asian Games
- July 10-16: Pan American Games

== Important events ==
=== January ===
- The Australian Open along with five ATP tournaments, five WTA tournaments, the Hopman Cup, were scheduled in January.
- Polish duo Jerzy Janowicz and Agnieszka Radwańska defeated United States in the Hopman Cup Final to give Poland its first Hopman Cup victory.
- Roger Federer secured his 1,000th match win, along with his 83rd career title, by defeating Milos Raonic in three sets in the final of Brisbane International.

WTA Premier	Category	Champion(s)	Finalist(s)	Score in the final
Brisbane; Premier (January 4 – January 11)	Women's singles	(Russia) Maria Sharapova	(Serbia) Ana Ivanovic	6–7^{(4–7)}, 6–3, 6–3
Brisbane; Premier (January 4 – January 11)	Women's doubles	(Switzerland) Martina Hingis (Germany) Sabine Lisicki	(France) Caroline Garcia (Slovenia) Katarina Srebotnik	6–2, 7–5
Sydney; Premier (January 11 – January 17)	Women's singles	(Czech Republic) Petra Kvitová	(Czech Republic) Karolína Plíšková	7–6^{(7–5)}, 7–6^{(8–6)}
Sydney; Premier (January 11 – January 17)	Women's doubles	(United States) Bethanie Mattek-Sands (India) Sania Mirza	(United States) Raquel Kops-Jones (United States) Abigail Spears	6–3, 6–3

=== February ===
ATP World Tour 500	Category	Champion(s)	Finalist(s)	Score in the final
Rotterdam (February 9 – February 15)	Men's singles	(Switzerland) Stanislas Wawrinka	(Czech Republic) Tomáš Berdych	4–6, 6–3, 6–4
Rotterdam (February 9 – February 15)	Men's doubles	(Netherlands) Jean-Julien Rojer (Romania) Horia Tecău	(United Kingdom) Jamie Murray (Australia) John Peers	3–6, 6–3, [10–8]

== 2015 in tennis results ==
=== Association of Tennis Professionals (ATP) ===
- January 4 – November 29: 2015 ATP World Tour
  - November 15 – 22: 2015 ATP World Tour Finals in (United Kingdom) London
    - Men's Singles: (Serbia) Novak Djokovic
    - Men's Doubles: (Netherlands) Jean-Julien Rojer / (Romania) Horia Tecău

==== ATP World Tour Masters 1000 ====
- March 12 – November 8: 2015 ATP World Tour Masters 1000 Tournament
  - March 12 – 22: 2015 BNP Paribas Open in (United States) Indian Wells, California
    - Men's Singles: (Serbia) Novak Djokovic
    - Men's Doubles: (Canada) Vasek Pospisil / (United States) Jack Sock
  - March 25 – April 5: 2015 Miami Open in the United States (new sponsor of event from Sony)
    - Men's Singles: (Serbia) Novak Djokovic
    - Men's Doubles: (United States) Bob Bryan / (United States) Mike Bryan
  - April 12 – 19: 2015 Monte-Carlo Rolex Masters, promoted as held in Monaco; venue in (France) Roquebrune-Cap-Martin
    - Men's Singles: (Serbia) Novak Djokovic
    - Men's Doubles: (United States) Bob Bryan / (United States) Mike Bryan
  - May 3 – 10: 2015 Mutua Madrid Open in Spain
    - Men's Singles: (United Kingdom) Andy Murray
    - Men's Doubles: (India) Rohan Bopanna / (Romania) Florin Mergea
  - May 11 – 18: 2015 Internazionali BNL d'Italia in (Italy) Rome
    - Men's Singles: (Serbia) Novak Djokovic
    - Men's Doubles: (Uruguay) Pablo Cuevas / (Spain) David Marrero
  - August 10 – 16: 2015 Rogers Cup for men in (Canada) Montreal
    - Men's Singles: (United Kingdom) Andy Murray
    - Men's Doubles: (United States) Bob Bryan / (United States) Mike Bryan
  - August 17 – 23: 2015 Western & Southern Open in (United States) Mason, Ohio (Cincinnati)
    - Men's Singles: (Switzerland) Roger Federer
    - Men's Doubles: (Canada) Daniel Nestor / (France) Édouard Roger-Vasselin
  - October 11 – 18: 2015 Shanghai Rolex Masters in China
    - Men's Singles: (Serbia) Novak Djokovic
    - Men's Doubles: (South Africa) Raven Klaasen / (Brazil) Marcelo Melo
  - November 2 – 8: 2015 BNP Paribas Masters in (France) Paris (final)
    - Men's Singles: (Serbia) Novak Djokovic
    - Men's Doubles: (Croatia) Ivan Dodig / (Brazil) Marcelo Melo

==== ATP World Tour 500 series ====
- February 9 – November 1: 2015 ATP World Tour 500 Series
  - February 9–15: 2015 ABN AMRO World Tennis Tournament
    - Men's Singles: (Switzerland) Stan Wawrinka
    - Men's Doubles: (Netherlands) Jean-Julien Rojer / (Romania) Horia Tecău
  - February 16–22: 2015 Rio Open
    - Men's Singles: (Spain) David Ferrer
    - Men's Doubles: (Slovakia) Martin Kližan / (Austria) Philipp Oswald
  - February 23–28: 2015 Dubai Tennis Championships
    - Men's Singles: (Switzerland) Roger Federer
    - Men's Doubles: (India) Rohan Bopanna / (Canada) Daniel Nestor
  - February 23–28: 2015 Abierto Mexicano Telcel
    - Men's Singles: (Japan) Kei Nishikori
    - Men's Doubles: (Croatia) Ivan Dodig / (Brazil) Marcelo Melo
  - April 20–26: 2015 Barcelona Open Banc Sabadell
    - Men's Singles: (Japan) Kei Nishikori
    - Men's Doubles: (Croatia) Marin Draganja / (Finland) Henri Kontinen
  - June 15–21: 2015 Gerry Weber Open
    - Men's Singles: (Switzerland) Roger Federer
    - Men's Doubles: (South Africa) Raven Klaasen / (United States) Rajeev Ram
  - June 15–21: 2015 Aegon Championships
    - Men's Singles: (United Kingdom) Andy Murray
    - Men's Doubles: (France) Pierre-Hugues Herbert / (France) Nicolas Mahut
  - July 27–August 2: 2015 International German Open
    - Men's Singles: (Spain) Rafael Nadal
    - Men's Doubles: (United Kingdom) Jamie Murray / (Australia) John Peers
  - August 3–9: 2015 Citi Open
    - Men's Singles: (Japan) Kei Nishikori
    - Men's Doubles: (United States) Bob Bryan / (United States) Mike Bryan
  - October 5–11: 2015 China Open
    - Men's Singles: (Serbia) Novak Djokovic
    - Men's Doubles: (Canada) Vasek Pospisil / (United States) Jack Sock
  - October 5–11: 2015 Rakuten Japan Open Tennis Championships
    - Men's Singles: (Switzerland) Stan Wawrinka
    - Men's Doubles: (South Africa) Raven Klaasen / (Brazil) Marcelo Melo
  - October 19–25: 2015 Erste Bank Open
    - Men's Singles: (Spain) David Ferrer
    - Men's Doubles: (Poland) Łukasz Kubot / (Brazil) Marcelo Melo
  - October 26–November 1: 2015 Swiss Indoors
    - Men's Singles: (Switzerland) Roger Federer
    - Men's Doubles: (Austria) Alexander Peya / (Brazil) Bruno Soares

==== ATP World Tour 250 series ====
- January 4 – November 1: 2015 ATP World Tour 250 Series
- January
  - January 4–11: 2015 Brisbane International
    - Men's Singles: (Switzerland) Roger Federer
    - Men's Doubles: (United Kingdom) Jamie Murray / (Australia) John Peers
  - January 5–11: 2015 Aircel Chennai Open
    - Men's Singles: (Switzerland) Stan Wawrinka
    - Men's Doubles: (Chinese Taipei) Yen-hsun Lu / (United Kingdom) Jonathan Marray
  - January 5–11: 2015 Qatar ExxonMobil Open
    - Men's Singles: (Spain) David Ferrer
    - Men's Doubles: (Argentina) Juan Mónaco / (Spain) Rafael Nadal
  - January 11–17: 2015 Apia International Sydney
    - Men's Singles: (Serbia) Viktor Troicki
    - Men's Doubles: (India) Rohan Bopanna / (Canada) Daniel Nestor
  - January 12–17: 2015 Heineken Open
    - Men's Singles: (Czech Republic) Jiří Veselý
    - Men's Doubles: (South Africa) Raven Klaasen / (India) Leander Paes
- February
  - February 2–8: 2015 Ecuador Open Quito (debut event)
    - Men's Singles: (Dominican Republic) Víctor Estrella Burgos
    - Men's Doubles: (Germany) Gero Kretschmer / (Germany) Alexander Satschko
  - February 2–8: 2015 Open Sud de France
    - Men's Singles: (France) Richard Gasquet
    - Men's Doubles: (New Zealand) Marcus Daniell / (New Zealand) Artem Sitak
  - February 2–8: 2015 PBZ Zagreb Indoors
    - Men's Singles: (Spain) Guillermo García-López
    - Men's Doubles: (Croatia) Marin Draganja / (Finland) Henri Kontinen
  - February 9–15: 2015 Brasil Open
    - Men's Singles: (Uruguay) Pablo Cuevas
    - Men's Doubles: (Colombia) Juan Sebastián Cabal / (Colombia) Robert Farah Maksoud
  - February 9–15: 2015 Memphis Open
    - Men's Singles: (Japan) Kei Nishikori
    - Men's Doubles: (Poland) Mariusz Fyrstenberg / (Mexico) Santiago González
  - February 16–22: 2015 Delray Beach Open
    - Men's Singles: (Croatia) Ivo Karlović
    - Men's Doubles: (United States) Bob Bryan / (United States) Mike Bryan
  - February 16–22: 2015 Open 13
    - Men's Singles: (France) Gilles Simon
    - Men's Doubles: (Croatia) Marin Draganja / (Finland) Henri Kontinen
  - February 23–March 1: 2015 Argentina Open
    - Men's Singles: (Spain) Rafael Nadal
    - Men's Doubles: (Finland) Jarkko Nieminen / (Brazil) André Sá
- April
  - April 6–12: 2015 Grand Prix Hassan II
    - Men's Singles: (Slovakia) Martin Kližan
    - Men's Doubles: (Australia) Rameez Junaid / (Canada) Adil Shamasdin
  - April 6–12: 2015 U.S. Men's Clay Court Championships
    - Men's Singles: (United States) Jack Sock
    - Men's Doubles: (Lithuania) Ričardas Berankis / (Russia) Teymuraz Gabashvili
  - April 20–26: 2015 BRD Năstase Țiriac Trophy
    - Men's Singles: (Czech Republic) Jiří Veselý
    - Men's Doubles: (Romania) Marius Copil / (Romania) Adrian Ungur
  - April 27–May 3: 2015 BMW Open
    - Men's Singles: (United Kingdom) Andy Murray
    - Men's Doubles: (Austria) Alexander Peya / (Brazil) Bruno Soares
  - April 27–May 3: 2015 Estoril Open
    - Men's Singles: (France) Richard Gasquet
    - Men's Doubles: (Philippines) Treat Huey / (United States) Scott Lipsky
  - April 27–May 3: Istanbul Open (debut event)
    - Men's Singles: (Switzerland) Roger Federer
    - Men's Doubles: (Moldova) Radu Albot / (Serbia) Dušan Lajović
- May
  - May 17–23: 2015 Open de Nice Côte d'Azur
    - Men's Singles: (Austria) Dominic Thiem
    - Men's Doubles: (Croatia) Mate Pavić / (New Zealand) Michael Venus
  - May 17–23: 2015 Geneva Open (returned to ATP World Tour)
    - Men's Singles: (Brazil) Thomaz Bellucci
    - Men's Doubles: (Colombia) Juan Sebastián Cabal / (Colombia) Robert Farah Maksoud
- June
  - June 8–14: 2015 Topshelf Open
    - Men's Singles: (France) Nicolas Mahut
    - Men's Doubles: (Croatia) Ivo Karlović / (Poland) Łukasz Kubot
  - June 8–14: 2015 MercedesCup
    - Men's Singles: (Spain) Rafael Nadal
    - Men's Doubles: (India) Rohan Bopanna / (Romania) Florin Mergea
  - June 21–27: 2015 Aegon Open Nottingham
    - Men's Singles: (Uzbekistan) Denis Istomin
    - Men's Doubles: (Australia) Chris Guccione / (Brazil) André Sá
- July
  - July 13–19: 2015 Hall of Fame Tennis Championships
    - Men's Singles: (United States) Rajeev Ram
    - Men's Doubles: (United Kingdom) Jonathan Marray / (Pakistan) Aisam-ul-Haq Qureshi
  - July 20–26: 2015 Swedish Open
    - Men's Singles: (France) Benoît Paire
    - Men's Doubles: (France) Jérémy Chardy / (Poland) Łukasz Kubot
  - July 20–26: 2015 Claro Open Colombia
    - Men's Singles: (Australia) Bernard Tomic
    - Men's Doubles: (France) Édouard Roger-Vasselin / (Czech Republic) Radek Štěpánek
  - July 20–26: 2015 Croatia Open Umag
    - Men's Singles: (Austria) Dominic Thiem
    - Men's Doubles: (Argentina) Máximo González / (Brazil) André Sá
  - July 27–August 2: 2015 Swiss Open Gstaad
    - Men's Singles: (Austria) Dominic Thiem
    - Men's Doubles: (Belarus) Aliaksandr Bury / (Uzbekistan) Denis Istomin
  - July 27–August 2: 2015 BB&T Atlanta Open
    - Men's Singles: (United States) John Isner
    - Men's Doubles: (United States) Bob Bryan / (United States) Mike Bryan
- August
  - August 3–8: 2015 Generali Open Kitzbühel
    - Men's Singles: (Germany) Philipp Kohlschreiber
    - Men's Doubles: (Spain) Nicolás Almagro / (Argentina) Carlos Berlocq
  - August 23–30: 2015 Winston-Salem Open
    - Men's Singles: (South Africa) Kevin Anderson
    - Men's Doubles: (United Kingdom) Dominic Inglot / (Sweden) Robert Lindstedt
- September
  - September 21–27: 2015 Moselle Open
    - Men's Singles: (France) Jo-Wilfried Tsonga
    - Men's Doubles: (Poland) Łukasz Kubot / (France) Édouard Roger-Vasselin
  - September 21–27: 2015 St. Petersburg Open
    - Men's Singles: (Canada) Milos Raonic
    - Men's Doubles: (Philippines) Treat Huey / (Finland) Henri Kontinen
  - September 28–October 4: 2015 Malaysian Open, Kuala Lumpur
    - Men's Singles: (Spain) David Ferrer
    - Men's Doubles: (Philippines) Treat Huey / (Finland) Henri Kontinen
  - September 28–October 4: 2015 ATP Shenzhen Open
    - Men's Singles: (Czech Republic) Tomáš Berdych
    - Men's Doubles: (Israel) Jonathan Erlich / (United Kingdom) Colin Fleming
- October
  - October 19–25: 2015 Stockholm Open
    - Men's Singles: (Czech Republic) Tomáš Berdych
    - Men's Doubles: (United States) Nicholas Monroe / (United States) Jack Sock
  - October 19–25: 2015 Kremlin Cup
    - Men's Singles: (Croatia) Marin Čilić
    - Men's Doubles: (Russia) Andrey Rublev / (Russia) Dmitry Tursunov
  - October 26–November 1: 2015 Valencia Open (final)
    - Men's Singles: (Portugal) João Sousa
    - Men's Doubles: (United States) Eric Butorac / (United States) Scott Lipsky

=== ATP Champions Tour (Senior Men) ===
- February 13 – December 6: 2015 ATP Champions Tour
  - February 13 – 15: 2015 Delray Beach Open in the United States
    - Team International ( (Australia) Mark Philippoussis, (Croatia) Goran Ivanišević, and (Sweden) Mikael Pernfors) defeated Team USA ( (New York (state)) James Blake, (California) Brad Gilbert, and (New Jersey) Justin Gimelstob) 6–3.
  - August 13 – 16: 2015 Optima Open in (Belgium) Knokke-Heist
    - (Belgium) Xavier Malisse defeated (United States) Pete Sampras 6–7 (5), 7–5, 13–11, in the final.
  - October 8 – 11: 2015 Reyes Del Tenis in (Spain) Majorca
    - (Spain) Àlex Corretja defeated (Sweden) Thomas Enqvist 3–6, 6–4, 10–7, in the final.
  - October 24 & 25: 2015 Kia Motors Champions Cup Tennis in (South Korea) Seoul (debut event)
    - (Chile) Fernando González defeated (United States) Michael Chang 7–6 and 6–2, in the final.
  - October 27 – 29: 2015 Monterrey Open in Mexico
    - (United States) Pete Sampras defeated fellow American, John McEnroe, 6–3 and 7–6, in the final.
  - November 20 – 22: 2015 La Grande Sfida in (Italy) Modena / Verona
    - (United States) John McEnroe defeated (Spain) Sergi Bruguera, 6–3 and 6–4, in the final.
  - December 2 – 6: 2015 Champions Tennis at the Royal Albert Hall in (United Kingdom) London (final)
    - (Chile) Fernando González defeated (United Kingdom) Tim Henman, 1–6, 7–6, and 10–6, in the final.

=== Women's Tennis Association (WTA) ===
- January 4 – November 8: 2015 WTA Tour
  - July 27 – August 2: Zhonghong Jiangxi International Women's Open in (China) Nanchang
    - Women's Singles: (Serbia) Jelena Janković
    - Women's Doubles: (Chinese Taipei) Chang Kai-chen / (China) Zheng Saisai
  - October 25 – November 1: 2015 WTA Finals in Singapore
    - Women's Singles: (Poland) Agnieszka Radwańska
    - Women's Doubles: (Switzerland) Martina Hingis / (India) Sania Mirza
  - November 2 – 8: 2015 WTA Elite Trophy in (China) Zhuhai (debut event and replaces the WTA Tournament of Champions)
    - Women's Singles: (United States) Venus Williams
    - Women's Doubles: (China) Liang Chen / (China) Wang Yafan

==== WTA Premier tournaments ====
- January 4 – October 24: 2015 WTA Premier tournaments
  - January 4–11: 2015 Brisbane International
    - Women's Singles: (Russia) Maria Sharapova
    - Women's Doubles: (Switzerland) Martina Hingis / (Germany) Sabine Lisicki
  - January 11–17: 2015 Apia International Sydney
    - Women's Singles: (Czech Republic) Petra Kvitová
    - Women's Doubles: (United States) Bethanie Mattek-Sands / (India) Sania Mirza
  - February 9–15: 2015 Diamond Games
    - Women's Singles: (Germany) Andrea Petkovic
    - Women's Doubles: (Spain) Anabel Medina Garrigues / (Spain) Arantxa Parra Santonja
  - February 23–28: 2015 Qatar Total Open
    - Women's Singles: (Czech Republic) Lucie Šafářová
    - Women's Doubles: (United States) Raquel Kops-Jones / (United States) Abigail Spears
  - April 6–12: 2015 Family Circle Cup
    - Women's Singles: (Germany) Angelique Kerber
    - Women's Doubles: (Switzerland) Martina Hingis / (India) Sania Mirza
  - April 20–26: 2015 Porsche Tennis Grand Prix
    - Women's Singles: (Germany) Angelique Kerber
    - Women's Doubles: (United States) Bethanie Mattek-Sands / (Czech Republic) Lucie Šafářová
  - June 15–21: 2015 Aegon Classic
    - Women's Singles: (Germany) Angelique Kerber
    - Women's Doubles: (Spain) Garbiñe Muguruza / (Spain) Carla Suárez Navarro
  - June 21–27: 2015 Aegon International
    - Women's Singles: (Switzerland) Belinda Bencic
    - Women's Doubles: (France) Caroline Garcia / (Slovenia) Katarina Srebotnik
  - August 3–9: 2015 Bank of the West Classic
    - Women's Singles: (Germany) Angelique Kerber
    - Women's Doubles: (China) Xu Yifan / (China) Zheng Saisai
  - August 23–29: 2015 Connecticut Open
    - Women's Singles: (Czech Republic) Petra Kvitová
    - Women's Doubles: (Germany) Julia Görges / (Czech Republic) Lucie Hradecká
  - September 21–27: 2015 Toray Pan Pacific Open
    - Women's Singles: (Poland) Agnieszka Radwańska
    - Women's Doubles: (Spain) Garbiñe Muguruza / (Spain) Carla Suárez Navarro
  - October 19–24: 2015 Kremlin Cup
    - Women's Singles: (Russia) Svetlana Kuznetsova
    - Women's Doubles: (Russia) Daria Kasatkina / (Russia) Elena Vesnina

==== WTA International tournaments ====
- January 4 – October 25: 2015 WTA International tournaments
- January
  - January 4–10: 2015 Shenzhen Open
    - Women's Singles: (Romania) Simona Halep
    - Women's Doubles: (Ukraine) Lyudmyla Kichenok / (Ukraine) Nadiia Kichenok
  - January 5–10: 2015 ASB Classic
    - Women's Singles: (United States) Venus Williams
    - Women's Doubles: (Italy) Sara Errani / (Italy) Roberta Vinci
  - January 11–17: 2015 Hobart International
    - Women's Singles: (United Kingdom) Heather Watson
    - Women's Doubles: (Netherlands) Kiki Bertens / (Sweden) Johanna Larsson
- February
  - February 9–15: 2015 PTT Pattaya Open
    - Women's Singles: (Slovakia) Daniela Hantuchová
    - Women's Doubles: (Chinese Taipei) Chan Hao-ching / (Chinese Taipei) Chan Yung-jan
  - February 16–22: 2015 Rio Open
    - Women's Singles: (Italy) Sara Errani
    - Women's Doubles: (Belgium) Ysaline Bonaventure / (Sweden) Rebecca Peterson
  - February 23–28: 2015 Abierto Mexicano Telcel
    - Women's Singles: (Switzerland) Timea Bacsinszky
    - Women's Doubles: (Spain) Lara Arruabarrena / (Spain) María Teresa Torró Flor
- March
  - March 2–8: 2015 Abierto Monterrey Afirme
    - Women's Singles: (Switzerland) Timea Bacsinszky
    - Women's Doubles: (Canada) Gabriela Dabrowski / (Poland) Alicja Rosolska
  - March 2–8: 2015 BMW Malaysian Open
    - Women's Singles: (Denmark) Caroline Wozniacki
    - Women's Doubles: (China) Liang Chen / (China) Wang Yafan
- April
  - April 6–12: 2015 Katowice Open
    - Women's Singles: (Slovakia) Anna Karolína Schmiedlová
    - Women's Doubles: (Belgium) Ysaline Bonaventure / (Netherlands) Demi Schuurs
  - April 13–19: 2015 Copa Colsanitas
    - Women's Singles: (Brazil) Teliana Pereira
    - Women's Doubles: (Brazil) Paula Cristina Gonçalves / (Brazil) Beatriz Haddad Maia
  - April 27–May 2: 2015 Grand Prix SAR La Princesse Lalla Meryem
    - Women's Singles: (Ukraine) Elina Svitolina
    - Women's Doubles: (Hungary) Tímea Babos / (France) Kristina Mladenovic
  - April 27–May 2: 2015 Sparta Prague Open
    - Women's Singles: (Czech Republic) Karolína Plíšková
    - Women's Doubles: (Switzerland) Belinda Bencic / (Czech Republic) Kateřina Siniaková
- May
  - May 17–23: 2015 Internationaux de Strasbourg
    - Women's Singles: (Australia) Samantha Stosur
    - Women's Doubles: (Chinese Taipei) Chuang Chia-jung / (China) Liang Chen
  - May 17–23: 2015 Nürnberger Versicherungscup
    - Women's Singles: (Italy) Karin Knapp
    - Women's Doubles: (Chinese Taipei) Chan Hao-ching / (Spain) Anabel Medina Garrigues
- June
  - June 8–14: 2015 Aegon Open Nottingham
    - Women's Singles: (Croatia) Ana Konjuh
    - Women's Doubles: (United States) Raquel Kops-Jones / (United States) Abigail Spears
  - June 8–14: 2015 Topshelf Open
    - Women's Singles: (Italy) Camila Giorgi
    - Women's Doubles: (United States) Asia Muhammad / (Germany) Laura Siegemund
- July
  - July 13–19: 2015 BRD Bucharest Open
    - Women's Singles: (Slovakia) Anna Karolína Schmiedlová
    - Women's Doubles: (Georgia (country)) Oksana Kalashnikova / (Netherlands) Demi Schuurs
  - July 13–19: 2015 Swedish Open
    - Women's Singles: (Sweden) Johanna Larsson
    - Women's Doubles: (Netherlands) Kiki Bertens / (Sweden) Johanna Larsson
  - July 20–26: 2015 Gastein Ladies
    - Women's Singles: (Australia) Samantha Stosur
    - Women's Doubles: (Montenegro) Danka Kovinić / (Liechtenstein) Stephanie Vogt
  - July 20–26: 2015 İstanbul Cup
    - Women's Singles: (Ukraine) Lesia Tsurenko
    - Women's Doubles: (Russia) Daria Gavrilova / (Ukraine) Elina Svitolina
  - July 27–August 1: 2015 Brasil Tennis Cup
    - Women's Singles: (Brazil) Teliana Pereira
    - Women's Doubles: (Germany) Annika Beck / (Germany) Laura Siegemund
  - July 27–August 2: 2015 Baku Cup
    - Women's Singles: (Russia) Margarita Gasparyan
    - Women's Doubles: (Russia) Margarita Gasparyan / (Russia) Alexandra Panova
- August
  - August 3–9: 2015 Citi Open
    - Women's Singles: (United States) Sloane Stephens
    - Women's Doubles: (Switzerland) Belinda Bencic / (France) Kristina Mladenovic
- September
  - September 14–20: 2015 Coupe Banque Nationale
    - Women's Singles: (Germany) Annika Beck
    - Women's Doubles: (Czech Republic) Barbora Krejčíková / (Belgium) An-Sophie Mestach
  - September 14–20: 2015 Japan Women's Open
    - Women's Singles: (Belgium) Yanina Wickmayer
    - Women's Doubles: (Chinese Taipei) Chan Hao-ching / (Chinese Taipei) Chan Yung-jan
  - September 21–27: 2015 Guangzhou International Women's Open
    - Women's Singles: (Serbia) Jelena Janković
    - Women's Doubles: (Switzerland) Martina Hingis / (India) Sania Mirza
  - September 21–27: 2015 Korea Open
    - Women's Singles: (Romania) Irina-Camelia Begu
    - Women's Doubles: (Spain) Lara Arruabarrena / (Slovenia) Andreja Klepač
  - September 28–October 3: 2015 Tashkent Open
    - Women's Singles: (Japan) Nao Hibino
    - Women's Doubles: (Russia) Margarita Gasparyan / (Russia) Alexandra Panova
- October
  - October 12–18: 2015 Tianjin Open
    - Women's Singles: (Poland) Agnieszka Radwańska
    - Women's Doubles: (China) Xu Yifan / (China) Zheng Saisai
  - October 12–18: 2015 Hong Kong Tennis Open
    - Women's Singles: (Serbia) Jelena Janković
    - Women's Doubles: (France) Alizé Cornet / (Kazakhstan) Yaroslava Shvedova
  - October 12–18: 2015 Generali Ladies Linz
    - Women's Singles: (Russia) Anastasia Pavlyuchenkova
    - Women's Doubles: (United States) Raquel Kops-Jones / (United States) Abigail Spears
  - October 19–25: 2015 BGL Luxembourg Open
    - Women's Singles: (Japan) Misaki Doi
    - Women's Doubles: (Germany) Mona Barthel / (Germany) Laura Siegemund

==== Premier Mandatory events ====
- March 11 – October 11: 2015 WTA Premier Mandatory events
  - March 11 – 22: 2015 BNP Paribas Open
    - Women's Singles: (Romania) Simona Halep
    - Women's Doubles: (Switzerland) Martina Hingis / (India) Sania Mirza
  - March 24 – April 5: 2015 Miami Open
    - Women's Singles: (United States) Serena Williams
    - Women's Doubles: (Switzerland) Martina Hingis / (India) Sania Mirza
  - May 2 – 10: 2015 Mutua Madrid Open
    - Women's Singles: (Czech Republic) Petra Kvitová
    - Women's Doubles: (Australia) Casey Dellacqua / (Kazakhstan) Yaroslava Shvedova
  - October 3 – 11: 2015 China Open in Beijing
    - Women's Singles: (Spain) Garbiñe Muguruza
    - Women's Doubles: (Switzerland) Martina Hingis / (India) Sania Mirza

==== Premier 5 events ====
- February 15 – October 3: 2015 WTA Premier 5 events
  - February 15 – 21: 2015 Dubai Tennis Championships in the United Arab Emirates
    - Women's Singles: (Romania) Simona Halep
    - Women's Doubles: (Hungary) Tímea Babos / (France) Kristina Mladenovic
  - May 12 – 18: 2015 Internazionali BNL d'Italia
    - Women's Singles: (Russia) Maria Sharapova
    - Women's Doubles: (Hungary) Tímea Babos / (France) Kristina Mladenovic
  - August 8 – 16: 2015 Rogers Cup for women in (Canada) Toronto
    - Women's Singles: (Switzerland) Belinda Bencic
    - Women's Doubles: (United States) Bethanie Mattek-Sands / (Czech Republic) Lucie Šafářová
  - August 17 – 23: 2015 Western & Southern Open
    - Women's Singles: (United States) Serena Williams
    - Women's Doubles: (Chinese Taipei) Chan Hao-ching / (Chinese Taipei) Chan Yung-jan
  - September 27 – October 3: 2015 Wuhan Open in China
    - Women's Singles: (United States) Venus Williams
    - Women's Doubles: (Switzerland) Martina Hingis / (India) Sania Mirza

=== Other tennis events ===
- January 4 – 10: 2015 Hopman Cup in (Australia) Perth
  - Poland defeated the United States, 2–1 in matches, to win its first Hopman Cup title.
- February 7 – November 15: 2015 Fed Cup
  - The Czech Republic defeated Russia, 3–2, to win their ninth Fed Cup title.
- March 6 – November 29: 2015 Davis Cup
  - Great Britain defeated Belgium, 3–1, to win their tenth Davis Cup title.
- May 25 – 31: 2015 BNP Paribas World Team Cup (wheelchair tennis) in (Turkey) Antalya
  - Men's World Group #1 winners: Great Britain (Gordon Reid, Marc McCarroll, Dave Phillipson, Alfie Hewett)
  - Men's World Group #2 winners: Spain (Daniel Caverzaschi, Martin de la Puente, Roberto Chamizo, Françesc Tur)[
  - Women's World Group winners: Netherlands (Jiske Griffioen, Aniek van Koot, Diede de Groot)
  - Quad World Group winners: United States (David Wagner, Nick Taylor, Greg Hasterok, Bryan Barten)
  - Juniors World Group winners: United States (Christopher Herman, Conner Stroud, Casey Ratzlaff)
- August 2: 2015 World TeamTennis Finals in (United States) Washington, D.C.
  - The Washington Kastles defeated the Austin Aces, 24–18 in extended play, to win their fifth straight King Trophy as WTT champions.
- November 3 – 7: 2015 UNIQLO Wheelchair Doubles Masters in (United States) Mission Viejo, California
  - Men's Doubles winners: (France) Stéphane Houdet / (Belgium) Joachim Gérard
  - Women's Doubles winners: (Netherlands) Jiske Griffioen / (Netherlands) Aniek van Koot
  - Quad Doubles winners: (United States) Nicholas Taylor / (United States) David Wagner
- December 2 – 6: 2015 NEC Wheelchair Tennis Masters (singles) in (United Kingdom) London
  - Men's Singles winner: (Belgium) Joachim Gérard
  - Women's Singles winner: (Netherlands) Jiske Griffioen
  - Quads Singles winner: (United States) David Wagner
- December 2 – 20: 2015 International Premier Tennis League season in India, Philippines, Singapore, United Arab Emirates, and Japan
  - Team Singapore Slammers defeated Team (India) Indian Aces, 26–21, to win their first International Premier Tennis League title.
- December 10 – 12: Brazil Masters Cup in Rio de Janeiro (Olympic and Paralympic Test Event)
  - Men's Singles winner: (Brazil) Thiago Monteiro
  - Men's Wheelchair Singles winner: (Brazil) Daniel Rodrigues
  - Women's Singles winner: (Brazil) Gabriela Cé
  - Women's Wheelchair Singles winner: (Brazil) Natalia Mayara

== International Tennis Hall of Fame ==
- Class of 2015:
  - David Hall, player
  - Amélie Mauresmo, player
  - Nancy Jeffett, contributor
