= 2015 WTA Elite Trophy =

- Date: November 3 – 8
- Edition: 1st
- Draw: 12S/6D
- Surface: Hard / Outdoor / Covered Court
- Location: Zhuhai, China
- Venue: Hengqin International Tennis Center

Champions

Singles
- (United States) Venus Williams

Doubles
- (China) Liang Chen / (China) Wang Yafan
WTA Elite Trophy	· 2016 →

The 2015 WTA Elite Trophy was a women's tennis tournament played at the Hengqin International Tennis Center in Zhuhai, China. It was the 1st edition of the singles event and doubles competition. The tournament was contested by twelve singles players and six doubles teams. The event replaced the WTA Tournament of Champions.

== Tournament ==
=== Qualifying ===
WTA Elite Trophy is an invitation-only event.

==== Singles qualifying ====
The field will consist of the top eleven players not already qualified for the 2015 WTA Finals, plus either (a) the 12th-player not qualified for 2015 WTA Finals, or (b) a wild card. The final two alternates for the 2015 WTA Finals (Venus Williams and Carla Suárez Navarro) would have been eligible to play in WTA Elite Trophy even if they had participated in the WTA Finals.

==== Doubles qualifying ====
The field will consist of the top four pairs of players not already qualified for the 2015 WTA Finals, plus two wild cards. For each wild card not given out, the next highest pair of players not already qualified for the 2015 WTA Finals shall become a participant. As in the case of the singles field, the final alternate pair for the 2015 WTA Finals (Alla Kudryavtseva/Anastasia Pavlyuchenkova) are eligible to play in WTA Elite Trophy even if they subsequently participate in the WTA Finals.

=== Format ===
The singles event features twelve players in a round robin event, split into four groups of three. Over the first four days of competition, each player meets the other two players in her group, with the winner in each group advancing to the semifinal. The winners of each semifinal meet in the championship match. The six doubles teams will be split into two round robin groups, with the winner of each advancing to the final.

==== Round robin tie-breaking methods ====
The final standings of each group were determined by the first of the following methods that applied:

1. Greatest number of wins.
2. Greatest number of matches played.
3. Head-to-head results
4. In case of a 3-way tie:
- Percentage of sets won
- Percentage of games won

== Prize money and points ==
The total prize money for the Huajin Securities 2015 WTA Elite Trophy Zhuhai 2015 WTA Finals was US$2,150,000.

Stage	Singles		Doubles	
Stage	Prize money	Points	Prize money	Points
Champion	RR^{1} + $450,000	RR + 460	RR^{1} + $20,000	—
Runner-up	RR + $150,000	RR + 200	RR^{1} + $10,000	—
Semifinalist	RR + $15,000	RR	—	—
Round Robin win per match	$92,500	120	$5,000	—
Round Robin loss per match	$20,000	40	—	—
Participation fee	—	—	15,000	—
Alternates	$10,000	—	—	—

- ^{1} RR means prize money or points won in the round robin round.

== Qualified players ==
=== Singles ===
Seeds	Players	Points	Tours
1	(United States) Venus Williams	3,091	17
2	(Spain) Carla Suárez Navarro	3,030	24
3	(Czech Republic) Karolína Plíšková	2,955	25
4	(Italy) Roberta Vinci	2,655	24
5	(Denmark) Caroline Wozniacki	2,641	23
6	(Italy) Sara Errani	2,525	25
7	(United States) Madison Keys	2,495	18
8	(Ukraine) Elina Svitolina	2,410	24
9	(Serbia) Jelena Janković	2,345	24
10	(Germany) Andrea Petkovic	2,106	24
11	(Russia) Svetlana Kuznetsova	1,847	19
12	(China) Zheng Saisai [WC]	789	26

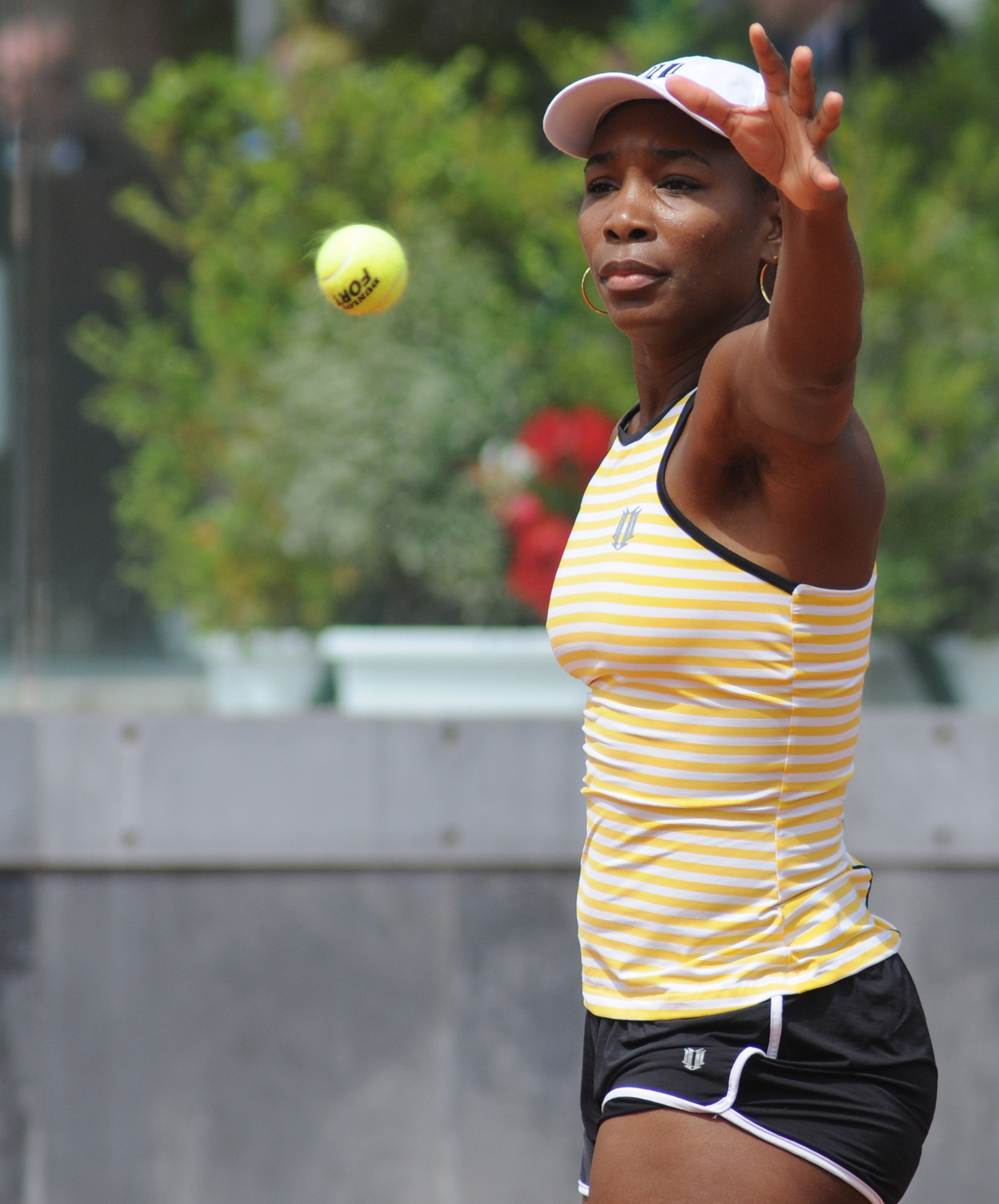
Venus Williams had a resurgent 2015.

Venus Williams had a resurgent year in 2015. She began the year by winning the ASB Classic defeating Caroline Wozniacki in three sets. She then followed it up by reaching her first slam quarterfinal at the Australian Open since 2010 losing to Madison Keys. She also was able to reach the quarterfinals of the US Open losing to sister Serena. She won her biggest title since Dubai 2010, by claiming the Wuhan Open defeating Garbiñe Muguruza in the finals. She also was the first alternate for the 2015 WTA Finals but was not used.

Carla Suárez Navarro had a break through season in 2015, including breaking through the top 10 and reaching a career high of no. 8 in the world. She was able to reach three finals in the year, but losing in all of them. The first coming at the Diamond Games, where she needed to withdraw from the final against Andrea Petkovic with a neck injury. She followed it up with her biggest final to date at the Miami Open but lost to world no. 1 Serena Williams winning just two games. Her third final was at the Internazionali BNL d'Italia where she fell to Maria Sharapova in three sets. Despite strong showings at WTA events, Suárez Navarro struggled at the major events losing in the first round of three of the four slams. She also struggled in the second half of the year, going on an 8 match losing streak from mid-June to late September, and only winning 5 of her last 17 matches going into the 2015 WTA Finals. She also served as an alternate at the WTA Finals but wasn't used.

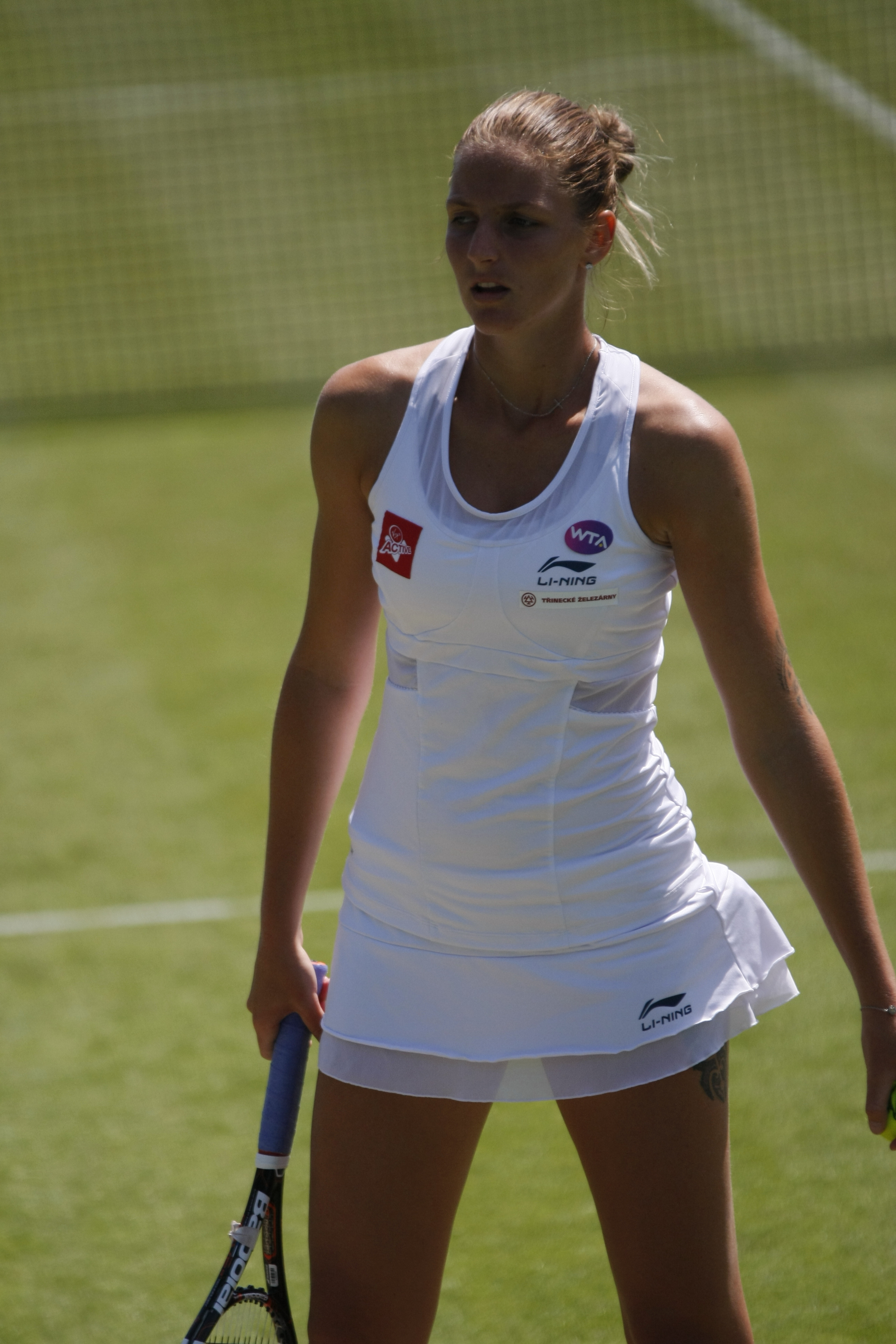
Karolína Plíšková broke into the top 10.

Karolína Plíšková had a breakthrough year in 2015, including breaking through the top 10 with a career high of number 7. She reached five finals in 2015, the most finals reached by any player. She began the year by reaching the final of the Apia International Sydney losing to Petra Kvitová. She reached her biggest final to date at the Dubai Tennis Championships but fell to Simona Halep in two tight sets. She took her lone title of 2015 at her home tournament at the Prague Open defeating compatriot Lucie Hradecká in three sets. She reached the finals of Aegon Classic and Bank of the West Classic, both losing to Angelique Kerber in three tight sets. Despite these performances at WTA events, she struggled at majors only surpassing the second round once.

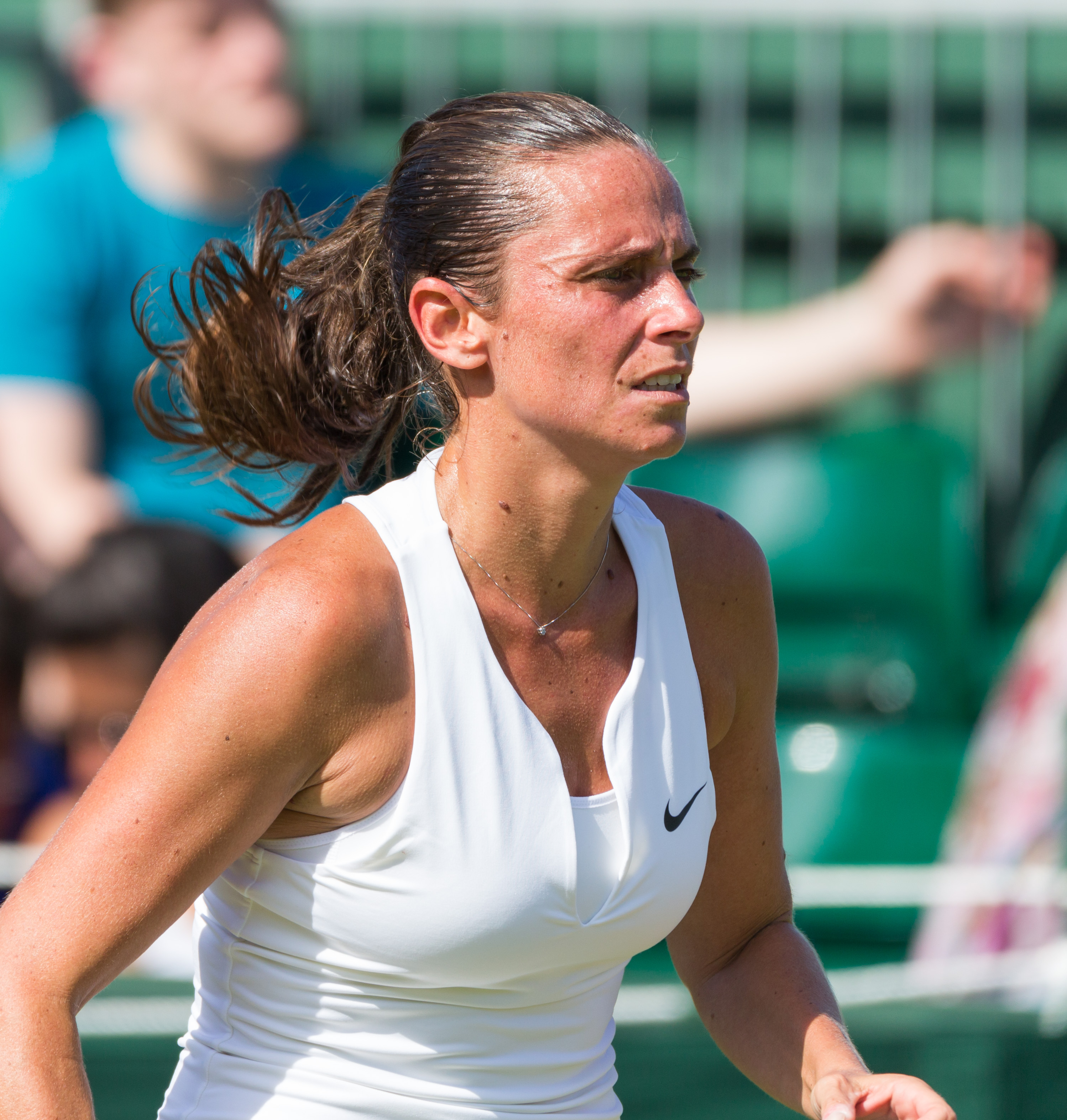
Roberta Vinci reached first Grand Slam final.

Roberta Vinci had a slow start to the year only winning back-to-back matches twice until she reached the final of Nürnberger Versicherungscup losing to compatriot Karin Knapp in three sets. She wasn't able to carry this momentum following the final up with four first round loses. She reached the quarterfinals of Rogers Cup and followed it up with the biggest upset of the year when she ended Serena Williams dreams of a Grand Slam in New York in the semifinal. In the final she faced her compatriot Flavia Pennetta, who was in her first slam final as well, she went down in straight sets. She followed it up with a semifinal showing at the Wuhan Open losing to Venus Williams.

Caroline Wozniacki began the year by the reaching the final of ASB Classic but lost to Venus Williams. She followed it up with a semifinal performance at the Dubai Tennis Championships losing to Simona Halep. She won her lone title of the year at the Malaysian Open defeating Alexandra Dulgheru in three sets. She reached her third final of the year at the Porsche Tennis Grand Prix losing in three sets to Angelique Kerber. This is the first year Wozniacki failed to get to the WTA Finals even as an alternate since 2008. She reached the second round of all slams except for a fourth round showing at the Wimbledon Championships.

Sara Errani did not begin the year well until she reached the final of the Rio Open defeating Anna Karolína Schmiedlová in the final. At the French Open, Errani was able to reach the quarterfinals for the fourth straight year losing to Serena Williams. She reached her second final of the year at the BRD Bucharest Open, once again facing Anna Karolína Schmiedlová but this time losing. She then reached the semifinal of the Rogers Cup losing to Simona Halep. She then reached the quarterfinals of the China Open losing to Timea Bacsinszky.

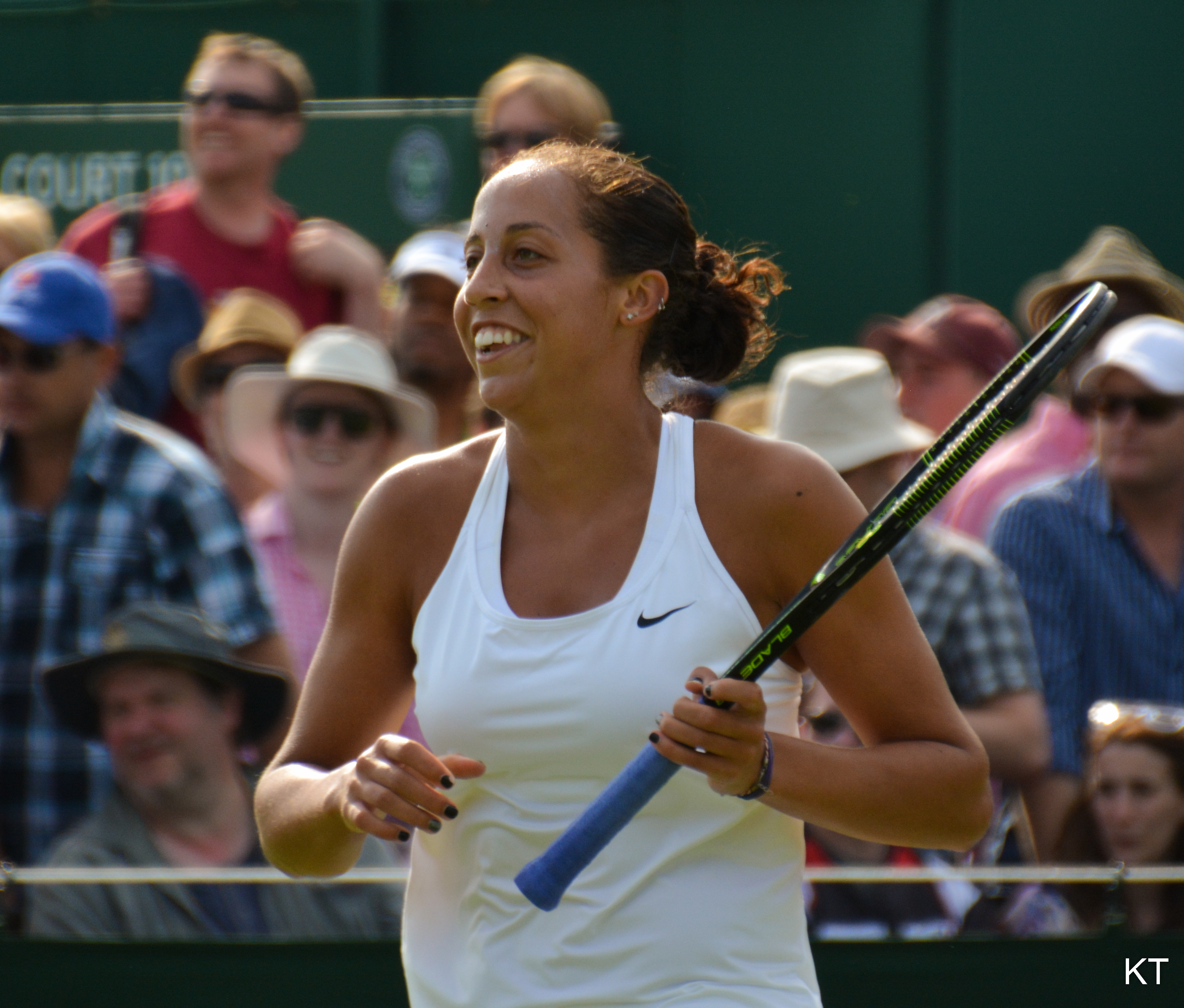
Madison Keys reached first Grand Slam semifinal.

Madison Keys began 2015 well, she was able to upset Petra Kvitová in the third round, then world no. 4 her biggest win to date based on ranking. Keys eventually reached the semifinals for the first time in her career where she lost to world no. 1 Serena Williams in straight sets. She reached her second career final at the Family Circle Cup losing to Angelique Kerber in three sets. At the Wimbledon Championships, she reached the quarterfinals losing to Agnieszka Radwańska in three sets. She also reached the fourth round US Open losing once again to world no. 1 Serena Williams. She also reached a career high of No. 16.

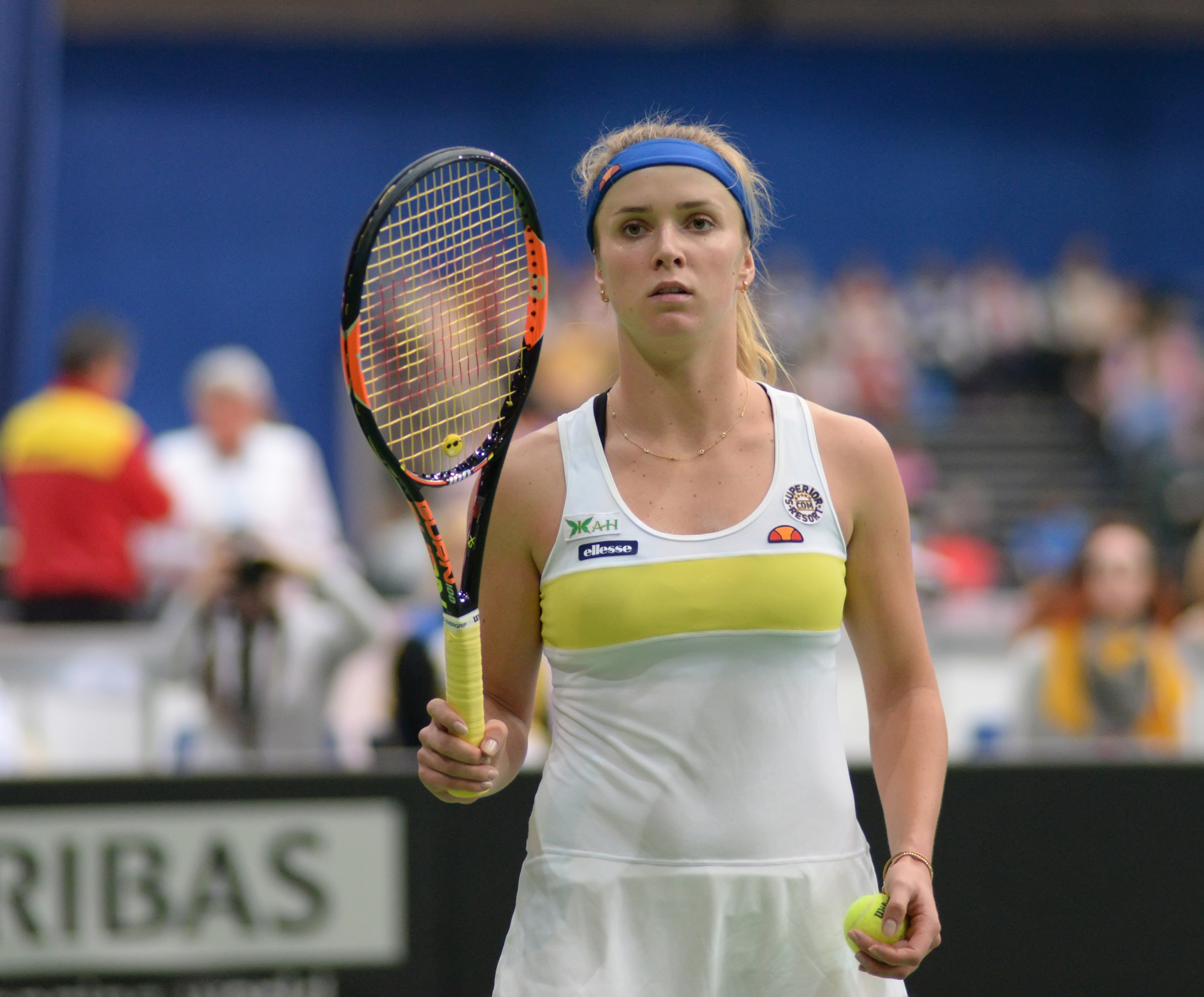
Elina Svitolina broke into the top 20.

Elina Svitolina had a breakthrough year proving her place as a rising star on tour. She began the year by reaching the semifinal of the Brisbane International losing to Maria Sharapova. Svitolina won the third title of her career at the Grand Prix SAR La Princesse Lalla Meryem defeating Tímea Babos in the final. She reached her first slam quarterfinal at the French Open losing to Ana Ivanovic in straight sets. At the Western & Southern Open, Svitolina reached the semifinals by defeating Lucie Šafářová before losing to Serena Williams. She also reached a career high of No. 15.

Jelena Janković had inconsistent results in first half of the year except reaching the final of Indian Wells. She, however, rebounded with strong performance at Wimbledon and then went on to reach the semifinals of Cincinnati and won three titles after a strong Asian swing in Nanchang, Guangzhou and Hong Kong.

Andrea Petkovic had a strong season despite a certain degree of inconsistency. Highlighted by a title in Antwerp as well as semifinal showings in Miami and Charleston. She also reached the quarterfinals of Doha and Eastbourne. She found consistency at the slams reaching the third round of the last three slams.

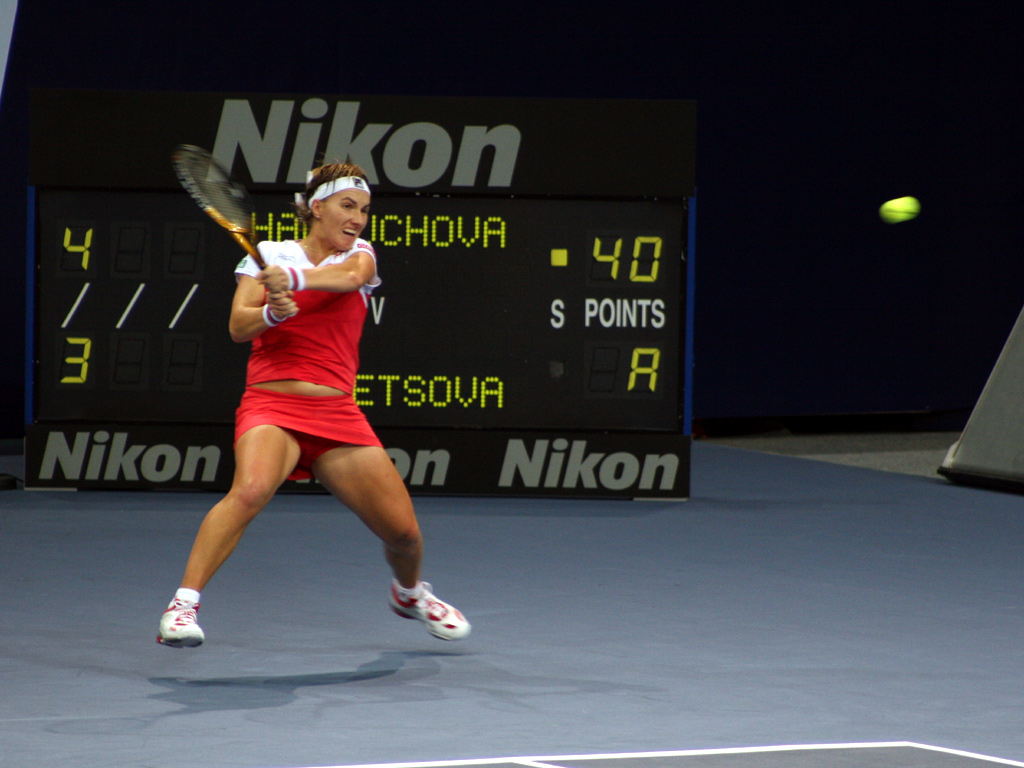
Svetlana Kuznetsova reached Madrid final.

Svetlana Kuznetsova had an inconsistent season finding her form momentarily within the year. Highlighted by winning the title in her home nation in Moscow and reaching the final of Madrid. She also reached the quarterfinals of Guangzhou as well as the fourth round of the US Open, Miami and Beijing.

Zheng Saisai heads to Zhuhai after being awarded a wildcard to play in front of her home nation. Her season was highlighted by a win of the WTA 125k title in Dalian and a semifinal performance in Shenzhen as well as quarterfinal showings at Tokyo and Guangzhou.

=== Doubles ===
Seeds	Players	Points	Tours
1	(Poland) Klaudia Jans-Ignacik / (Slovenia) Andreja Klepač	1,339	14
2	(Spain) Anabel Medina Garrigues / (Spain) Arantxa Parra Santonja	1,751	14
3	(Canada) Gabriela Dabrowski / (Poland) Alicja Rosolska	1,415	20
4	(China) Liang Chen / (China) Wang Yafan [WC]	963	7
5	(Ukraine) Lyudmyla Kichenok / (Ukraine) Nadiia Kichenok	1,235	13
6	(China) Xu Shilin / (China) You Xiaodi [WC]	180	1

Klaudia Jans-Ignacik and Andreja Klepač lost in the round of 16 in their first two tournaments in Sydney and Hobart together to Ana Ivanovic and Angelique Kerber and Kiki Bertens and Johanna Larsson respectively. They then reached the quarterfinals at the Australian Open, edging Jelena Janković and Arantxa Parra Santonja, upsetting sixth seed Garbiñe Muguruza and Carla Suárez Navarro and ninth seed Andrea Hlaváčková and Lucie Hradecká along the way before losing to fourteenth seed Chan Yung-jan and Zheng Jie in straight sets. They beat Dominika Cibulková and Kirsten Flipkens to reach the quarterfinals in Antwerp but was beaten in three sets by Barbora Krejčíková and Renata Voráčová and then they lost in straight sets to Anastasia Rodionova and Arina Rodionova in Dubai. They then reached the semifinals in Indian Wells, upsetting fourth seed Hsieh Su-wei and Flavia Pennetta, defeating Svetlana Kuznetsova and Coco Vandeweghe, Sabine Lisicki and Andrea Petkovic along the way before losing to second seed Ekaterina Makarova and Elena Vesnina in straight sets. They beat Kiki Bertens and Tatjana Maria to reach the round of 16 in Miami before losing to ninth seed Andrea Hlaváčková and Lucie Hradecká in straight sets. They then beat Oksana Kalashnikova and Kateřina Siniaková in straight sets to reach the quarterfinals in Stuttgart before losing to Arantxa Parra Santonja and Alicja Rosolska in three sets. They lost in the round of 16 to Bethanie Mattek-Sands and Lucie Šafářová, having beaten Gabriela Dabrowski and Alicja Rosolska in the round of 32. They then suffered a five-week drought without a win, losing their first match in Rome, French Open, Eastbourne, Wimbledon to fifth seed Bethanie Mattek-Sands and Lucie Šafářová, Janette Husárová and Paula Kania, fourth seed Caroline Garcia and Katarina Srebotnik, Kimiko Date-Krumm and Francesca Schiavone respectively.

Anabel Medina Garrigues / Arantxa Parra Santonja

Gabriela Dabrowski / Alicja Rosolska

Liang Chen / Wang Yafan

Lyudmyla Kichenok / Nadiia Kichenok

Xu Shilin / You Xiaodi

== Player head-to-head ==
Below are the head-to-head records as they approached the tournament.

2015 WTA Elite Trophy – Singles

#	Player	Williams	Suárez Navarro	Plíšková	Vinci	Wozniacki	Errani	Keys	Svitolina	Janković	Petkovic	Kuznetsova	Zheng	Overall	YTD
1	(United States) Venus Williams		3–3	0–0	4–0	7–0	3–1	1–1	1–0	6–7	2–2	4–4	0–0	31–18	37–13
2	(Spain) Carla Suárez Navarro	3–3		3–2	4–1	1–4	3–7	0–1	1–1	2–5	3–2	3–3	0–0	23–29	40–23
3	(Czech Republic) Karolína Plíšková	0–0	2–3		0–2	0–3	0–1	0–0	3–0	0–1	1–2	0–0	1–0	7–12	49–24
4	(Italy) Roberta Vinci	0–4	1–4	2–0		2–3	4–6	2–0	1–1	2–5	1–1	2–3	0–0	16–27	31–24
5	(Denmark) Caroline Wozniacki	0–7	4–1	3–0	3–2		3–1	0–0	0–0	5–5	4–1	6–4	1–0	29–21	39–22
6	(Italy) Sara Errani	1–3	7–3	1–0	6–4	1–3		1–0	1–0	3–1	3–2	1–6	2–0	27–20	48–26
7	(United States) Madison Keys	1–1	1–0	0–0	0–2	0–0	0–1		1–0	1–3	0–1	2–0	0–0	6–8	30–17
8	(Ukraine) Elina Svitolina	0–1	1–1	0–3	1–1	0–0	0–1	0–1		0–2	1–0	1–0	0–0	4–10	38–23
9	(Serbia) Jelena Janković	7–6	5–2	1–0	5–2	5–5	1–3	3–1	2–0		2–4	8–6	2–1	41–30	43–19
10	(Germany) Andrea Petkovic	2–2	2–3	2–1	1–1	1–4	2–3	1–0	0–1	4–2		4–2	0–0	19–19	31–10
11	(Russia) Svetlana Kuznetsova	4–4	3–3	0–0	3–2	4–6	6–1	0–2	0–1	6–8	2–4		0–0	28–31	27–18
12	(China) Zheng Saisai	0–0	0–0	0–1	0–0	0–1	0–2	0–0	0–0	1–2	0–0	0–0		1–6	29–25

== Road to Elite Trophy ==
The 2 tables below are part of the tables from Road to Singapore

=== Singles ===
==== Qualified players ====
Players with a gold rank cell have qualified.
Players with a brown rank cell were eligible to play but chose not to participate.

Rank	Athlete	Grand Slam tournament				Premier Mandatory				Best Premier 5		Best other						Total points	Tours	Titles
Rank	Athlete	AUS	FRA	WIM	USO	INW	MIA	MAD	BEI	1	2	1	2	3	4	5	6	Total points	Tours	Titles
Qualified for WTA Elite Trophy
10	(Switzerland) Timea Bacsinszky	R32; 130	SF; 780	QF; 430	R128; 10	QF; 215	A 0	R64; 10	F 650	R16; 105	R64; 1	W 280	W 280	F 180	QF; 60	R64; 1	R32; 1	3133	17	2
11	(United States) Venus Williams	QF; 430	R128; 10	R16; 240	QF; 430	A 0	QF; 215	R64; 10	R32; 10	W 900	R16; 105	W 280	SF; 185	SF; 110	R16; 105	R32; 60	R64; 1	3091	17	2
12	(Spain) Carla Suárez Navarro	R128; 10	R32; 130	R128; 10	R128; 10	QF; 215	F 650	QF; 215	R16; 120	F 585	QF; 190	F 305	SF; 185	R16; 105	QF; 100	QF; 100	QF; 100	3030	24	0
13	(Czech Republic) Karolína Plíšková	R32; 130	R64; 70	R64; 70	R128; 10	R16; 120	QF; 215	R32; 65	R64; 10	F 585	QF; 190	F 305	F 305	F 305	W 280	SF; 185	SF; 110	2955	25	1
14	(Switzerland) Belinda Bencic	R128; 10	R64; 70	R16; 240	R32; 130	R16; 120	R16; 120	R64; 10	R32; 65	W 900	R16; 105	W 470	F 305	F 180	R32; 60	R32; 60	R16; 55	2900	24	2
15	(Italy) Roberta Vinci	R64; 70	R128; 10	R128; 10	F 1300	R64; 35	R64; 10	R16; 120	R16; 120	SF; 350	QF; 190	F 180	R16; 80	QF; 60	QF; 60	R16; 30	R16; 30	2655	24	0
16	(Serbia) Ana Ivanovic	R128; 10	SF; 780	R64; 70	R128; 10	R32; 65	R32; 65	R16; 120	SF; 390	QF; 190	QF; 190	F 305	SF; 110	R16; 105	R16; 105	QF; 100	R16; 30	2645	19	0
17	(Denmark) Caroline Wozniacki	R64; 70	R64; 70	R16; 240	R64; 70	R32; 65	R16; 120	QF; 215	R16; 120	SF; 350	R32; 1	F 305	W 280	SF; 185	SF; 185	SF; 185	F 180	2641	23	1
18	(Italy) Sara Errani	R32; 130	QF; 430	R64; 70	R32; 130	R32; 65	R16; 120	R32; 65	QF; 215	SF; 350	R32; 60	W 280	F 180	SF; 110	SF; 110	SF; 110	QF; 100	2525	25	1
19	(United States) Madison Keys	SF; 780	R32; 130	QF; 430	R16; 240	R32; 65	R64; 10	R64; 10	R16; 120	R32; 60	R32; 60	F 305	QF; 60	R32; 60	R16; 55	R16; 55	R16; 55	2495	18	0
20	(Ukraine) Elina Svitolina	R32; 130	QF; 430	R64; 70	R32; 130	R16; 120	R32; 65	R32; 65	R32; 65	SF; 350	R16; 105	W 280	SF; 185	SF; 185	SF; 110	R32; 60	R32; 60	2410	24	1
21	(Serbia) Jelena Janković	R128; 10	R128; 10	R16; 240	R128; 10	F 650	R64; 10	A 0	R64; 10	SF; 350	R16; 105	W 280	W 280	W 160	SF; 110	QF; 60	QF; 60	2345	24	3
22	(Belarus) Victoria Azarenka	R16; 240	R32; 130	QF; 430	QF; 430	R32; 65	R32; 65	R16; 120	A 0	QF; 190	R16; 105	F 305	R16; 105	R32; 60	R32; 30	R32; 1		2276	15	0
23	(Russia) Ekaterina Makarova	SF; 780	R16; 240	R64; 70	R16; 240	R32; 65	R16; 120	R64; 10	A 0	QF; 190	R16; 105	SF; 110	QF; 100	R32; 60	R16; 55	R16; 55	R16; 1	2201	17	0
24	(Germany) Andrea Petkovic	R128; 10	R32; 130	R32; 130	R32; 130	R64; 10	SF; 390	R32; 65	R16; 120	R16; 105	R16; 105	W 470	SF; 185	QF; 100	QF; 100	R16; 55	R64; 1	2106	24	1
25	(Australia) Samantha Stosur	R64; 70	R32; 130	R32; 130	R16; 240	R32; 65	R32; 65	R16; 120	R32; 65	R16; 60	R32; 30	W 280	W 280	SF; 110	SF; 110	R16; 55	R16; 55	1865	24	2
26	(Russia) Svetlana Kuznetsova	R128; 10	R64; 70	R64; 70	R16; 240	R128; 10	R16; 120	F 650	R16; 120	R16; 60	R64; 1	W 470	QF; 60	R16; 55	R16; 55	R16; 30	R31; 1	1847	19	1

==== Other entrants ====
The following player received a wildcard into the singles draw:

- (China) Zheng Saisai

=== Doubles ===
==== Qualified players ====
Pairs with a gold rank cell have qualified.
Pairs with a brown rank cell were eligible to play but chose not to participate.

Rank	Athlete	Points											Total points	Tours	Titles
Rank	Athlete	1	2	3	4	5	6	7	8	9	10	11	Total points	Tours	Titles
11	Alla Kudryavtseva (RUS); Anastasia Pavlyuchenkova (RUS)	QF; 430	SF; 350	SF; 350	R16; 240	R16; 240	SF; 185	R32; 130	R16; 120	R16; 120	R16; 120	R16; 120	2,405	14	0
12	Michaëlla Krajicek (NED); Barbora Strýcová (CZE)	SF; 780	QF; 430	R16; 240	R32; 130	SF; 185	R16; 120	R16; 105	R16; 105	QF; 100	R32; 10	R32; 10	2,325	14	0
13	Chan Yung-jan (TPE); Zheng Jie (CHN)	F 1300	F 305	R16; 240	SF; 185	SF; 110	R64; 10	R32; 1					2,151	7	0
14	Kiki Bertens (NED); Johanna Larsson (SWE)	QF; 430	W 280	W 280	R16; 240	F 180	SF; 110	SF; 110	SF; 110	QF; 60	R64; 10	R16; 1	1,811	11	2
15	Anabel Medina Garrigues (ESP); Arantxa Parra Santonja (ESP)	W 470	F 305	R16; 240	F 180	R32; 130	R16; 105	R16; 105	R16; 105	QF; 100	R32; 10	R16; 1	1,751	14	1
16	Gabriela Dabrowski (CAN); Alicja Rosolska (POL)	W 280	R16; 240	QF; 190	QF; 190	SF; 185	R16; 120	R16; 120	QF; 60	R64; 10	R64; 10	R64; 10	1,415	20	1
17	Hsieh Su-wei (TPE); Flavia Pennetta (ITA)	QF; 430	QF; 430	QF; 215	QF; 190	R16; 120	R32; 10						1,395	6	0
18	Anastasia Rodionova (AUS); Arina Rodionova (AUS)	R16; 240	QF; 215	QF; 190	F 180	R32; 130	R32; 130	SF; 110	QF; 100	QF; 60	R32; 10	R32; 10	1,375	16	0
19	Klaudia Jans-Ignacik (POL); Andreja Klepač (SLO)	QF; 430	SF; 390	R16; 120	R16; 120	QF; 100	QF; 100	SF; 57	R64; 10	R64; 10	R16; 1	R16; 1	1,339	14	0
20	Sara Errani (ITA); Flavia Pennetta (ITA)	SF; 780	QF; 190	QF; 190	R16; 120								1,280	4	0
21	Lyudmyla Kichenok (UKR); Nadiia Kichenok (UKR)	W 280	R32; 130	R16; 120	SF; 110	SF; 110	R16; 105	QF; 100	W 80	W 80	QF; 60	QF; 60	1,235	13	1

==== Other entrants ====
The following pairs received wildcards into the doubles draw:

- (China) Liang Chen / (China) Wang Yafan
- (China) Xu Shilin / (China) You Xiaodi

== Champions ==
=== Singles ===
- (United States) Venus Williams def. (Czech Republic) Karolína Plíšková 7–5, 7–6^{(8–6)}

=== Doubles ===
- (China) Liang Chen/ (China) Wang Yafan def. (Spain) Anabel Medina Garrigues / (Spain) Arantxa Parra Santonja, 6–4, 6–3
