= 2015 WTA Premier tournaments =

The 2015 WTA Premier tournaments are 21 of the tennis tournaments on the 2015 WTA Tour. The WTA Tour is the elite tour for women's professional tennis. The WTA Premier tournaments are divided into three levels, which all rank below the Grand Slam events and above the WTA International tournaments.

== Schedule ==
=== Premier ===
Week of	Tournament	Champions	Runners-up	Semifinalists	Quarterfinalists
5 January	Brisbane International; Brisbane, Australia	(Russia) Maria Sharapova; 6–7^{(4–7)}, 6–3, 6–3	(Serbia) Ana Ivanovic	(Ukraine) Elina Svitolina (United States) Varvara Lepchenko	(Spain) Carla Suárez Navarro (Germany) Angelique Kerber (Russia) Alla Kudryavtseva (Estonia) Kaia Kanepi
5 January	Brisbane International; Brisbane, Australia	(Switzerland) Martina Hingis (Germany) Sabine Lisicki; 6–2, 7–5	(France) Caroline Garcia (Slovenia) Katarina Srebotnik	(Ukraine) Elina Svitolina (United States) Varvara Lepchenko	(Spain) Carla Suárez Navarro (Germany) Angelique Kerber (Russia) Alla Kudryavtseva (Estonia) Kaia Kanepi
12 January	Apia International Sydney; Sydney, Australia	(Czech Republic) Petra Kvitová; 7–6^{(7–6)}, 7–6^{(8–6)}	(Czech Republic) Karolína Plíšková	(Germany) Angelique Kerber (Bulgaria) Tsvetana Pironkova	(Spain) Carla Suárez Navarro (Spain) Garbiñe Muguruza (Czech Republic) Barbora Záhlavová Strýcová (Australia) Jarmila Gajdošová
12 January	Apia International Sydney; Sydney, Australia	(United States) Bethanie Mattek-Sands (India) Sania Mirza; 6–3, 6–3	(United States) Raquel Kops-Jones (United States) Abigail Spears	(Germany) Angelique Kerber (Bulgaria) Tsvetana Pironkova	(Spain) Carla Suárez Navarro (Spain) Garbiñe Muguruza (Czech Republic) Barbora Záhlavová Strýcová (Australia) Jarmila Gajdošová
9 February	Diamond Games; Antwerp, Belgium	(Germany) Andrea Petkovic; Walkover	(Spain) Carla Suárez Navarro	(Czech Republic) Barbora Záhlavová Strýcová (Czech Republic) Karolína Plíšková	(Germany) Mona Barthel (Slovakia) Dominika Cibulková (Czech Republic) Lucie Šafářová (Italy) Francesca Schiavone
9 February	Diamond Games; Antwerp, Belgium	(Spain) Anabel Medina Garrigues (Spain) Arantxa Parra Santonja; 6–4, 3–6, [10–5]	(Belgium) An-Sophie Mestach (Belgium) Alison Van Uytvanck	(Czech Republic) Barbora Záhlavová Strýcová (Czech Republic) Karolína Plíšková	(Germany) Mona Barthel (Slovakia) Dominika Cibulková (Czech Republic) Lucie Šafářová (Italy) Francesca Schiavone
23 February	Qatar Total Open; Doha, Qatar	(Czech Republic) Lucie Šafářová; 6–4, 6–3	(Belarus) Victoria Azarenka	(Spain) Carla Suárez Navarro (United States) Venus Williams	(Czech Republic) Petra Kvitová (Germany) Andrea Petkovic (Poland) Agnieszka Radwańska (Denmark) Caroline Wozniacki
23 February	Qatar Total Open; Doha, Qatar	(United States) Raquel Kops-Jones (United States) Abigail Spears; 6–4, 6–4	(Chinese Taipei) Hsieh Su-wei (India) Sania Mirza	(Spain) Carla Suárez Navarro (United States) Venus Williams	(Czech Republic) Petra Kvitová (Germany) Andrea Petkovic (Poland) Agnieszka Radwańska (Denmark) Caroline Wozniacki
6 April	Family Circle Cup; Charleston, USA	(Germany) Angelique Kerber; 6–2, 4–6, 7–5	(United States) Madison Keys	(Czech Republic) Lucie Hradecká (Germany) Andrea Petkovic	(United States) Lauren Davis (Italy) Sara Errani (Montenegro) Danka Kovinić (Romania) Irina-Camelia Begu
6 April	Family Circle Cup; Charleston, USA	(Switzerland) Martina Hingis (India) Sania Mirza; 6–0, 6–4	(Australia) Casey Dellacqua (Croatia) Darija Jurak	(Czech Republic) Lucie Hradecká (Germany) Andrea Petkovic	(United States) Lauren Davis (Italy) Sara Errani (Montenegro) Danka Kovinić (Romania) Irina-Camelia Begu
20 April	Porsche Tennis Grand Prix; Stuttgart, Germany	(Germany) Angelique Kerber; 3–6, 6–1, 7–5	(Denmark) Caroline Wozniacki	(United States) Madison Brengle (Romania) Simona Halep	(Russia) Ekaterina Makarova (France) Caroline Garcia (Spain) Carla Suárez Navarro (Italy) Sara Errani
20 April	Porsche Tennis Grand Prix; Stuttgart, Germany	(Czech Republic) Lucie Šafářová (United States) Bethanie Mattek-Sands; 6–4, 6–3	(France) Caroline Garcia (Slovenia) Katarina Srebotnik	(United States) Madison Brengle (Romania) Simona Halep	(Russia) Ekaterina Makarova (France) Caroline Garcia (Spain) Carla Suárez Navarro (Italy) Sara Errani
15 June	Aegon Classic; Birmingham, UK	(Germany) Angelique Kerber; 6–7^{(5–7)}, 6–3, 7–6^{(7–4)}	(Czech Republic) Karolína Plíšková	(France) Kristina Mladenovic (Germany) Sabine Lisicki	(Romania) Simona Halep (Spain) Carla Suárez Navarro (Czech Republic) Kateřina Siniaková (Slovakia) Daniela Hantuchová
15 June	Aegon Classic; Birmingham, UK	(Spain) Garbiñe Muguruza (Spain) Carla Suárez Navarro; 6–4, 6–4	(Czech Republic) Andrea Hlaváčková (Czech Republic) Lucie Hradecká	(France) Kristina Mladenovic (Germany) Sabine Lisicki	(Romania) Simona Halep (Spain) Carla Suárez Navarro (Czech Republic) Kateřina Siniaková (Slovakia) Daniela Hantuchová
22 June	Aegon International; Eastbourne, UK	(Switzerland) Belinda Bencic; 6–4, 4–6, 6–0	(Poland) Agnieszka Radwańska	(United States) Sloane Stephens (Denmark) Caroline Wozniacki	(Russia) Daria Gavrilova (Bulgaria) Tsvetana Pironkova (United Kingdom) Johanna Konta (Germany) Andrea Petkovic
22 June	Aegon International; Eastbourne, UK	(France) Caroline Garcia (Slovenia) Katarina Srebotnik; 7–6^{(7–5)}, 6–2	(Chinese Taipei) Chan Yung-jan (China) Zheng Jie	(United States) Sloane Stephens (Denmark) Caroline Wozniacki	(Russia) Daria Gavrilova (Bulgaria) Tsvetana Pironkova (United Kingdom) Johanna Konta (Germany) Andrea Petkovic
3 August	Bank of the West Classic; Stanford, USA	(Germany) Angelique Kerber; 6–3, 5–7, 6–4	(Czech Republic) Karolína Plíšková	(United States) Varvara Lepchenko (Ukraine) Elina Svitolina	(Germany) Mona Barthel (Croatia) Ajla Tomljanović (United States) Alison Riske (Poland) Agnieszka Radwańska
3 August	Bank of the West Classic; Stanford, USA	(China) Xu Yifan (China) Zheng Saisai; 6–1, 6–3	(Spain) Anabel Medina Garrigues (Spain) Arantxa Parra Santonja	(United States) Varvara Lepchenko (Ukraine) Elina Svitolina	(Germany) Mona Barthel (Croatia) Ajla Tomljanović (United States) Alison Riske (Poland) Agnieszka Radwańska
24 August	Connecticut Open; New Haven, USA	(Czech Republic) Petra Kvitová; 6–7^{(6–8)}, 6–2, 6–2	(Czech Republic) Lucie Šafářová	(Ukraine) Lesia Tsurenko (Denmark) Caroline Wozniacki	(Czech Republic) Karolína Plíšková (Slovakia) Dominika Cibulková (France) Caroline Garcia (Poland) Agnieszka Radwańska
24 August	Connecticut Open; New Haven, USA	(Germany) Julia Görges (Czech Republic) Lucie Hradecká; 6–3, 6–1	(Chinese Taipei) Chuang Chia-jung (China) Chen Liang	(Ukraine) Lesia Tsurenko (Denmark) Caroline Wozniacki	(Czech Republic) Karolína Plíšková (Slovakia) Dominika Cibulková (France) Caroline Garcia (Poland) Agnieszka Radwańska
21 September	Toray Pan Pacific Open; Tokyo, Japan	(Poland) Agnieszka Radwańska; 6–2, 6–2	(Switzerland) Belinda Bencic	(Denmark) Caroline Wozniacki (Slovakia) Dominika Cibulková	(Germany) Angelique Kerber (Spain) Garbiñe Muguruza (Czech Republic) Karolína Plíšková (Serbia) Ana Ivanovic
21 September	Toray Pan Pacific Open; Tokyo, Japan	(Spain) Garbiñe Muguruza (Spain) Carla Suárez Navarro; 7–5, 6–1	(Chinese Taipei) Chan Hao-ching (Chinese Taipei) Chan Yung-jan	(Denmark) Caroline Wozniacki (Slovakia) Dominika Cibulková	(Germany) Angelique Kerber (Spain) Garbiñe Muguruza (Czech Republic) Karolína Plíšková (Serbia) Ana Ivanovic
19 October	Kremlin Cup; Moscow, Russia	(Russia) Svetlana Kuznetsova; 6–2, 6–1	(Russia) Anastasia Pavlyuchenkova	(Ukraine) Lesia Tsurenko (Russia) Daria Kasatkina	(Italy) Flavia Pennetta (Latvia) Anastasija Sevastova (Spain) Carla Suárez Navarro (Russia) Margarita Gasparyan
19 October	Kremlin Cup; Moscow, Russia	(Russia) Daria Kasatkina (Russia) Elena Vesnina; 6–3, 6–7^{(7–9)}, [10–5]	(Romania) Irina-Camelia Begu (Romania) Monica Niculescu	(Ukraine) Lesia Tsurenko (Russia) Daria Kasatkina	(Italy) Flavia Pennetta (Latvia) Anastasija Sevastova (Spain) Carla Suárez Navarro (Russia) Margarita Gasparyan
