= 2015 Family Circle Cup – Doubles =

Doubles
- 2015 Family Circle Cup

Final
- Champions: (Switzerland) Martina Hingis (India) Sania Mirza
- Runners-up: (Australia) Casey Dellacqua (Croatia) Darija Jurak
- Score: 6–0, 6–4

Details
- Draw: 16
- Seeds: 4

Events
Singles	Doubles
- Family Circle Cup

Anabel Medina Garrigues and Yaroslava Shvedova were the defending champions, but lost to Martina Hingis and Sania Mirza in the quarterfinals.
Hingis and Mirza went on to win their third title in a row, defeating Casey Dellacqua and Darija Jurak in the final, 6–0, 6–4. Mirza became the top-ranked doubles player in the WTA rankings by winning the final.

== Seeds ==
1. (Switzerland) Martina Hingis / (India) Sania Mirza (champions)
2. (United States) Raquel Kops-Jones / (United States) Abigail Spears (quarterfinals)
3. (Chinese Taipei) Chan Hao-ching / (Chinese Taipei) Chan Yung-jan (first round)
4. (Hungary) Tímea Babos / (Germany) Anna-Lena Grönefeld (quarterfinals)

== Draw ==
Key

- Q = Qualifier
- WC = Wild card
- LL = Lucky loser
- Alt = Alternate
- ITF = ITF entry
- PR = Protected ranking
- SR = Special ranking
- SE = Special exempt
- JE = Junior exempt
- JR = Junior Accelerator Programme entrant
- CO = College Accelerator Programme entrant
- NG = Next Gen Accelerator Program entrant
- w/o = Walkover
- r = Retired
- d = Defaulted

=== Draw ===
First round
1	(Switzerland) M Hingis (India) S Mirza	6^{7}	6	[10]
(Australia) An Rodionova (Australia) Ar Rodionova	7^{9}	3	[5]
WC	(United States) M Keys (United States) L Raymond	5	5
(Spain) A Medina Garrigues (Kazakhstan) Y Shvedova	7	7
3	(Chinese Taipei) H-c Chan (Chinese Taipei) Y-j Chan	6	0	[4]
(United States) B Mattek-Sands (Croatia) A Tomljanović	2	6	[10]
(Canada) G Dabrowski (Poland) A Rosolska	4	6	[2]
(Russia) A Kudryavtseva (Russia) A Pavlyuchenkova	6	2	[10]
WC	(United States) A Riske (United States) S Rogers	4	2
(New Zealand) M Erakovic (Germany) A Petkovic	6	6
(Romania) I-C Begu (Spain) A Parra Santonja	4	2
4	(Hungary) T Babos (Germany) A-L Grönefeld	6	6
(Australia) C Dellacqua (Croatia) D Jurak	6	2	[11]
(Slovenia) A Klepač (Spain) S Soler Espinosa	3	6	[9]
(Japan) K Date-Krumm (Ukraine) O Savchuk	4	6	[4]
2	(United States) R Kops-Jones (United States) A Spears	6	3	[10]

Quarterfinals
1	(Switzerland) M Hingis (India) S Mirza	7	4	[13]
(Spain) A Medina Garrigues (Kazakhstan) Y Shvedova	5	6	[11]
(United States) B Mattek-Sands (Croatia) A Tomljanović	4	4
(Russia) A Kudryavtseva (Russia) A Pavlyuchenkova	6	6
(New Zealand) M Erakovic (Germany) A Petkovic	6	6
4	(Hungary) T Babos (Germany) A-L Grönefeld	1	2
(Australia) C Dellacqua (Croatia) D Jurak	6	6
2	(United States) R Kops-Jones (United States) A Spears	3	3

Semifinals
1	(Switzerland) M Hingis (India) S Mirza	6	1	[10]
(Russia) A Kudryavtseva (Russia) A Pavlyuchenkova	4	6	[7]
(New Zealand) M Erakovic (Germany) A Petkovic	4	6	[5]
(Australia) C Dellacqua (Croatia) D Jurak	6	1	[10]

Final
1	(Switzerland) M Hingis (India) S Mirza	6	6
(Australia) C Dellacqua (Croatia) D Jurak	0	4
