= 2015 Family Circle Cup – Singles =

Singles
- 2015 Family Circle Cup

Final
- Champion: (Germany) Angelique Kerber
- Runner-up: (United States) Madison Keys
- Score: 6–2, 4–6, 7–5

Details
- Draw: 56
- Seeds: 16

Events
| Singles | Doubles |
- Family Circle Cup

Andrea Petkovic was the defending champion, but she lost to Angelique Kerber in the semifinals.

Kerber went on to win her first outdoor title, defeating Madison Keys in the final, 6–2, 4–6, 7–5.

== Seeds ==
The top eight seeds receive a bye into the second round.

1. (Canada) Eugenie Bouchard (second round)
2. (Russia) Ekaterina Makarova (third round, withdrew because of a gastrointestinal illness)
3. (Germany) Andrea Petkovic (semifinals)
4. (Italy) Sara Errani (quarterfinals)
5. (Germany) Angelique Kerber (champion)
6. (Serbia) Jelena Janković (third round, withdrew)
7. (United States) Madison Keys (final)
8. (France) Caroline Garcia (third round)
9. (Australia) Samantha Stosur (second round)
10. (United States) Varvara Lepchenko (first round, retired)
11. (Kazakhstan) Zarina Diyas (first round)
12. (Switzerland) Belinda Bencic (second round)
13. (Romania) Irina-Camelia Begu (quarterfinals)
14. (Russia) Anastasia Pavlyuchenkova (first round, retired)
15. (Germany) Mona Barthel (third round, retired)
16. (United Kingdom) Heather Watson (first round)

Click on the seed number of a player to go to their draw section.

== Draw ==
Key

- Q = Qualifier
- WC = Wild card
- LL = Lucky loser
- Alt = Alternate
- ITF = ITF entry
- PR = Protected ranking
- SR = Special ranking
- SE = Special exempt
- JE = Junior exempt
- JR = Junior Accelerator Programme entrant
- CO = College Accelerator Programme entrant
- NG = Next Gen Accelerator Program entrant
- w/o = Walkover
- r = Retired
- d = Defaulted

=== Finals ===
Quarterfinals
(United States) Lauren Davis | 2 | 2
7 | (United States) Madison Keys | 6 | 6
4 | (Italy) Sara Errani | 2 | 4
Q | (Czech Republic) Lucie Hradecká | 6 | 6
Q | (Montenegro) Danka Kovinić | 6 | 3 | 1
3 | (Germany) Andrea Petkovic | 2 | 6 | 6
5 | (Germany) Angelique Kerber | 7^{7} | 7^{7}
13 | (Romania) Irina-Camelia Begu | 6^{3} | 6^{4}

Semifinals
7 | (United States) Madison Keys | 6 | 6
Q | (Czech Republic) Lucie Hradecká | 1 | 4
3 | (Germany) Andrea Petkovic | 4 | 4
5 | (Germany) Angelique Kerber | 6 | 6

Final
7 | (United States) Madison Keys | 2 | 6 | 5
5 | (Germany) Angelique Kerber | 6 | 4 | 7

=== Top half ===
==== Section 1 ====
First round
(United States) G Min | 7^{7} | 6^{2} | 3
(United States) L Davis | 6^{1} | 7^{7} | 6
(United States) S Stephens | 3 | 6 | 6
WC | (United States) B Mattek-Sands | 6 | 3 | 2
(Hungary) T Babos | 3 | 3
15 | (Germany) M Barthel | 6 | 6
10/WC | (United States) V Lepchenko | 2 | 1^{r}
(Romania) A Mitu | 6 | 2
(Croatia) A Tomljanović | 7^{7} | 4 | 6
(Romania) A Dulgheru | 6^{5} | 6 | 4
Q | (Ukraine) K Bondarenko | 6 | 4 | 6
(United States) A Riske | 4 | 6 | 1

Second round
1/WC | (Canada) E Bouchard | 3 | 1
(United States) L Davis | 6 | 6
(United States) S Stephens | 3 | 6^{2}
15 | (Germany) M Barthel | 6 | 7^{7}
(Romania) A Mitu | 6 | 6
(Croatia) A Tomljanović | 2 | 2
Q | (Ukraine) K Bondarenko | 2 | 1
7 | (United States) M Keys | 6 | 6

Third round
(United States) L Davis | 6 | 3
15 | (Germany) M Barthel | 4 | 0^{r}
(Romania) A Mitu | 2 | 0
7 | (United States) M Keys | 6 | 6

Quarterfinals
(United States) L Davis | 2 | 2
7 | (United States) M Keys | 6 | 6

==== Section 2 ====
First round
(Slovakia) J Čepelová | 6 | 6^{5} | 7^{7}
(Russia) E Vesnina | 2 | 7^{7} | 6^{4}
(United States) S Rogers | 6 | 6
(Spain) S Soler Espinosa | 3 | 1
Q | (Spain) S Sorribes Tormo | 6 | 3
14 | (Russia) A Pavlyuchenkova | 4 | 0^{r}
11 | (Kazakhstan) Z Diyas | 6 | 1 | 3
Q | (Czech Republic) L Hradecká | 4 | 6 | 6
(Croatia) M Lučić-Baroni | 3 | 6 | 3
Q | (Slovakia) K Kučová | 6 | 3 | 6
Q | (United States) J Pegula | 6 | 3 | 6^{4}
WC | (United States) S Vickery | 4 | 6 | 7^{7}

Second round
4 | (Italy) S Errani | 6 | 7^{7}
(Slovakia) J Čepelová | 3 | 6^{5}
(United States) S Rogers | 5 | 1
Q | (Spain) S Sorribes Tormo | 7 | 6
Q | (Czech Republic) L Hradecká | 7 | 6
Q | (Slovakia) K Kučová | 5 | 3
WC | (United States) S Vickery | 3 | 6 | 3
8 | (France) C Garcia | 6 | 4 | 6

Third round
4 | (Italy) S Errani | 6 | 5 | 6
Q | (Spain) S Sorribes Tormo | 2 | 7 | 2
Q | (Czech Republic) L Hradecká | 5 | 7 | 6
8 | (France) C Garcia | 7 | 5 | 4

Quarterfinals
4 | (Italy) S Errani | 2 | 4
Q | (Czech Republic) L Hradecká | 6 | 6

=== Bottom half ===
==== Section 3 ====
First round
(Germany) T Maria | 6 | 6
(United States) I Falconi | 1 | 3
Q | (Montenegro) D Kovinić | 6 | 6
(United States) C McHale | 2 | 3
(Australia) C Dellacqua | 1 | 2
12 | (Switzerland) B Bencic | 6 | 6
16 | (United Kingdom) H Watson | 3 | 6 | 5
(Croatia) D Vekić | 6 | 4 | 7
PR | (Romania) E Gallovits-Hall | 7^{7} | 4 | 2
(United States) M Brengle | 6^{2} | 6 | 6
(New Zealand) M Erakovic | 2 | 6 | 4
(South Africa) C Scheepers | 6 | 2 | 6

Second round
6 | (Serbia) J Janković | 6 | 6^{6} | 6
(Germany) T Maria | 3 | 7^{8} | 1
Q | (Montenegro) D Kovinić | 4 | 6 | 6
12 | (Switzerland) B Bencic | 6 | 3 | 2
(Croatia) D Vekić | 1 | 3
(United States) M Brengle | 6 | 6
(South Africa) C Scheepers | 6 | 1 | 2
3 | (Germany) A Petkovic | 1 | 6 | 6

Third round
6 | (Serbia) J Janković
Q | (Montenegro) D Kovinić | w/o
(United States) M Brengle | 4 | 4
3 | (Germany) A Petkovic | 6 | 6

Quarterfinals
Q | (Montenegro) D Kovinić | 6 | 3 | 1
3 | (Germany) A Petkovic | 2 | 6 | 6

==== Section 4 ====
First round
(Kazakhstan) Y Putintseva | 3 | 3
(Russia) E Rodina | 6 | 6
(Turkey) Ç Büyükakçay | 2 | 2
(Spain) L Arruabarrena | 6 | 6
Q | (Bulgaria) S Karatantcheva | 2 | 4
9 | (Australia) S Stosur | 6 | 6
13 | (Romania) I-C Begu | 6 | 7^{7}
Q | (Germany) L Siegemund | 2 | 6^{5}
(Switzerland) S Vögele | 5 | 2
(Kazakhstan) Y Shvedova | 7 | 6
(United States) N Gibbs | 4 | 5
(China) S Zhang | 6 | 7

Second round
5 | (Germany) A Kerber | 3 | 6 | 6
(Russia) E Rodina | 6 | 3 | 4
(Spain) L Arruabarrena | 6 | 3 | 6
9 | (Australia) S Stosur | 3 | 6 | 4
13 | (Romania) I-C Begu | 6 | 6^{4} | 6
(Kazakhstan) Y Shvedova | 0 | 7^{7} | 4
(China) S Zhang | 7 | 3 | 2
2 | (Russia) E Makarova | 5 | 6 | 6

Third round
5 | (Germany) A Kerber | 6 | 6
(Spain) L Arruabarrena | 3 | 0
13 | (Romania) I-C Begu | w/o
2 | (Russia) E Makarova

Quarterfinals
5 | (Germany) A Kerber | 7^{7} | 7^{7}
13 | (Romania) I-C Begu | 6^{3} | 6^{4}

== Qualifying ==
=== Seeds ===
1. (Czech Republic) Lucie Hradecká (qualified)
2. (China) Zhu Lin (first round)
3. (Bulgaria) Sesil Karatantcheva (qualified)
4. (Russia) Alla Kudryavtseva (first round)
5. (Japan) Kimiko Date-Krumm (qualifying competition)
6. (Portugal) Michelle Larcher de Brito (first round)
7. (Slovakia) Kristína Kučová (qualified)
8. (Montenegro) Danka Kovinić (qualified)
9. (Ukraine) Maryna Zanevska (first round)
10. (United States) Louisa Chirico (qualifying competition)
11. (Serbia) Jovana Jakšić (qualifying competition)
12. (Czech Republic) Barbora Krejčíková (qualifying competition)
13. (Germany) Laura Siegemund (qualified)
14. (Poland) Paula Kania (first round)
15. (Ukraine) Kateryna Bondarenko (qualified)
16. (Australia) Anastasia Rodionova (first round)

=== Qualifiers ===
1. (Czech Republic) Lucie Hradecká
2. (United States) Jessica Pegula
3. (Bulgaria) Sesil Karatantcheva
4. (Spain) Sara Sorribes Tormo
5. (Germany) Laura Siegemund
6. (Ukraine) Kateryna Bondarenko
7. (Slovakia) Kristína Kučová
8. (Montenegro) Danka Kovinić

=== Draw ===
==== First qualifier ====
First round
1 | (Czech Republic) Lucie Hradecká | 6 | 6
WC | (United States) Ellie Halbauer | 2 | 4
(Australia) Olivia Rogowska | 5 | 4
12 | (Czech Republic) Barbora Krejčíková | 7 | 6

Qualifying competition
1 | (Czech Republic) Lucie Hradecká | 7^{7} | 6
12 | (Czech Republic) Barbora Krejčíková | 6^{3} | 4

==== Second qualifier ====
First round
2 | (China) Zhu Lin | 3 | 6^{4}
WC | (United States) Jessica Pegula | 6 | 7^{7}
(Netherlands) Lesley Kerkhove | 7 | 6
9 | (Ukraine) Maryna Zanevska | 5 | 3

Qualifying competition
WC | (United States) Jessica Pegula | 7^{7} | 6
(Netherlands) Lesley Kerkhove | 6^{5} | 3

==== Third qualifier ====
First round
3 | (Bulgaria) Sesil Karatantcheva | 6 | 6
(Netherlands) Arantxa Rus | 2 | 1
(Canada) Gabriela Dabrowski | 2 | 4
10 | (United States) Louisa Chirico | 6 | 6

Qualifying competition
3 | (Bulgaria) Sesil Karatantcheva | 6 | 1 | 6
10 | (United States) Louisa Chirico | 3 | 6 | 1

==== Fourth qualifier ====
First round
4 | (Russia) Alla Kudryavtseva | 1 | 4
(Spain) Sara Sorribes Tormo | 6 | 6
(Poland) Katarzyna Piter | 2 | 7^{7} | 2
11 | (Serbia) Jovana Jakšić | 6 | 6^{1} | 6

Qualifying competition
(Spain) Sara Sorribes Tormo | 6 | 6
11 | (Serbia) Jovana Jakšić | 2 | 2

==== Fifth qualifier ====
First round
5 | (Japan) Kimiko Date-Krumm | 6 | 6
(United States) Julia Boserup | 1 | 1
WC | (Canada) Françoise Abanda | 1 | 5
13 | (Germany) Laura Siegemund | 6 | 7

Qualifying competition
5 | (Japan) Kimiko Date-Krumm | 0 | 1
13 | (Germany) Laura Siegemund | 6 | 6

==== Sixth qualifier ====
First round
6 | (Portugal) Michelle Larcher de Brito | 6^{5} | 6 | 2
(Brazil) Beatriz Haddad Maia | 7^{7} | 4 | 6
(United States) Catherine Bellis | 4 | 2
15 | (Ukraine) Kateryna Bondarenko | 6 | 6

Qualifying competition
(Brazil) Beatriz Haddad Maia | 3 | 6^{10}
15 | (Ukraine) Kateryna Bondarenko | 6 | 7^{12}

==== Seventh qualifier ====
First round
7 | (Slovakia) Kristína Kučová | 7^{7} | 6
WC | (United States) Samantha Crawford | 6^{3} | 4
(United States) Maria Sanchez | 7^{7} | 6
16 | (Australia) Anastasia Rodionova | 6^{5} | 2

Qualifying competition
7 | (Slovakia) Kristína Kučová | 6 | 1 | 6
(United States) Maria Sanchez | 4 | 6 | 4

==== Eighth qualifier ====
First round
8 | (Montenegro) Danka Kovinić | 6 | 6
(United States) Allie Kiick | 0 | 0
(Japan) Naomi Osaka | 6 | 6
14 | (Poland) Paula Kania | 3 | 1

Qualifying competition
8 | (Montenegro) Danka Kovinić | 4 | 6 | 7^{10}
(Japan) Naomi Osaka | 6 | 3 | 6^{8}
