= 2015 WTA Elite Trophy – Singles =

Singles
- 2015 WTA Elite Trophy

Final
- Champion: (United States) Venus Williams
- Runner-up: (Czech Republic) Karolína Plíšková
- Score: 7–5, 7–6^{(8–6)}

Events
Singles	Doubles
- WTA Elite Trophy

This was the first edition of the event.

Venus Williams won the title, defeating Karolína Plíšková in the final 7–5, 7–6^{(8–6)}. This resulted in Williams' return to the top 10 rankings for the first time since April 2011.

== Players ==
1. (United States) Venus Williams (champion)
2. (Spain) Carla Suárez Navarro (round robin)
3. (Czech Republic) Karolína Plíšková (final)
4. (Italy) Roberta Vinci (semifinals)
5. (Denmark) Caroline Wozniacki (round robin, retired due to a left wrist injury)
6. (Italy) Sara Errani (round robin)
7. (United States) Madison Keys (round robin)
8. (Ukraine) Elina Svitolina (semifinals)
9. (Serbia) Jelena Janković (round robin)
10. (Germany) Andrea Petkovic (round robin)
11. (Russia) Svetlana Kuznetsova (round robin)
12. (China) Zheng Saisai (round robin)

== Alternates ==
1. (Slovakia) Anna Karolína Schmiedlová (replaced Wozniacki, round robin)
2. (United States) Varvara Lepchenko (Not used)

== Draw ==
Key

- Q = Qualifier
- WC = Wild card
- LL = Lucky loser
- Alt = Alternate
- ITF = ITF entry
- PR = Protected ranking
- SR = Special ranking
- SE = Special exempt
- JE = Junior exempt
- JR = Junior Accelerator Programme entrant
- CO = College Accelerator Programme entrant
- NG = Next Gen Accelerator Program entrant
- w/o = Walkover
- r = Retired
- d = Defaulted

=== Finals ===
Semifinals
1	(United States) Venus Williams	6	6
4	(Italy) Roberta Vinci	2	2
3	(Czech Republic) Karolína Plíšková	6	6
8	(Ukraine) Elina Svitolina	3	1

Final
1	(United States) Venus Williams	7	7^{8}
3	(Czech Republic) Karolína Plíšková	5	6^{6}

=== Group A ===
		(United States) Williams	(United States) Keys	(China) Zheng	RR W–L	Set W–L	Game W–L	Standings
1	(United States) Venus Williams		3–6, 7–6^{(7–5)}, 6–1	4–6, 6–1, 6–1	2–0	4–2 (66.7%)	32–21 (60.4%)	1
7	(United States) Madison Keys	6–3, 6–7^{(5–7)}, 1–6		6–3, 6–2	1–1	3–2 (60%)	25–21 (54.3%)	2
12/WC	(China) Zheng Saisai	6–4, 1–6, 1–6	3–6, 2–6		0–2	1–4 (20%)	13–28 (31.7%)	3

=== Group B ===
		(Spain) Suárez Navarro	(Ukraine) Svitolina	(Germany) Petkovic	RR W–L	Set W–L	Game W–L	Standings
2	(Spain) Carla Suárez Navarro		7–6^{(7–4)}, 1–6, 3–6	6–0, 6–0	1–1	3–2 (60%)	23–18 (56.1%)	2
8	(Ukraine) Elina Svitolina	6–7^{(4–7)}, 6–1, 6–3		7–6^{(7–4)}, 6–3	2–0	4–1 (80%)	31–20 (60.8%)	1
10	(Germany) Andrea Petkovic	0–6, 0–6	6–7^{(4–7)}, 3–6		0–2	0–4 (0%)	9–25 (26.5%)	3

=== Group C ===
		(Czech Republic) Plíšková	(Italy) Errani	(Serbia) Janković	RR W–L	Set W–L	Game W–L	Standings
3	(Czech Republic) Karolína Plíšková		6–0, 6–3	6–4, 3–6, 6–2	2–0	4–1 (80.0%)	27–15 (64.3%)	1
6	(Italy) Sara Errani	0–6, 3–6		4–6, 5–7	0–2	0–4 (0%)	12–25 (32.4%)	3
9	(Serbia) Jelena Janković	4–6, 6–3, 2–6	6–4, 7–5		1–1	3–2 (60%)	25–24 (51.0%)	2

=== Group D ===
		(Italy) Vinci	(Denmark) Wozniacki (Slovakia) Schmiedlová	(Russia) Kuznetsova	RR W–L	Set W–L	Game W–L	Standings
4	(Italy) Roberta Vinci		1–6, 0–6 (w/ Schmiedlová)	6–4, 6–4	1–1	2–2 (50%)	13–20 (39.4%)	1
5 Alt	(Denmark) Caroline Wozniacki (Slovakia) Anna Karolína Schmiedlová	(w/ Schmiedlová); 6–1, 6–0		5–7, 2–2, ret. (w/ Wozniacki)	0–1; 1–0	0–2 (0%); 2–0 (100%)	7–9 (43.8%); 12–1 (92.3%)	X 3
11	(Russia) Svetlana Kuznetsova	4–6, 4–6	7–5, 2–2, ret. (w/ Wozniacki)		1–1	2–2 (50%)	8–12 (40%)	2
