= 2015 WTA Elite Trophy – Doubles =

Doubles
- 2015 WTA Elite Trophy

Final
- Champions: (China) Liang Chen (China) Wang Yafan
- Runners-up: (Spain) Anabel Medina Garrigues (Spain) Arantxa Parra Santonja
- Score: 6–4, 6–3

Events
Singles	Doubles
WTA Elite Trophy	· 2016 →

2015 WTA Elite Trophy doubles was a doubles tennis competition held as part of the 2015 WTA Elite Trophy tournament. 2015 was the event's first year. Liang Chen and Wang Yafan won the title, defeating Anabel Medina Garrigues and Arantxa Parra Santonja in the final, 6–4, 6–3.

== Players ==
1. (Poland) Klaudia Jans-Ignacik / (Slovenia) Andreja Klepač (round robin)
2. (Spain) Anabel Medina Garrigues / (Spain) Arantxa Parra Santonja (final)
3. (Canada) Gabriela Dabrowski / (Poland) Alicja Rosolska (round robin)
4. (China) Liang Chen / (China) Wang Yafan (champions)
5. (Ukraine) Lyudmyla Kichenok / (Ukraine) Nadiia Kichenok (round robin)
6. (China) Xu Shilin / (China) You Xiaodi (round robin)

== Draw ==
=== Key ===
- Q = Qualifier
- WC = Wild card
- LL = Lucky loser
- Alt = Alternate
- SE = Special exempt
- PR = Protected ranking
- ITF = ITF entry
- JE = Junior exempt
- w/o = Walkover
- r = Retired
- d = Defaulted
- SR = Special ranking

=== Final ===
Final
4/WC	(China) Liang Chen (China) Wang Yafan	6	6
2	(Spain) Anabel Medina Garrigues (Spain) Arantxa Parra Santonja	4	3

=== Group A ===
		(Poland) Jans-Ignacik (Slovenia) Klepač	(China) Liang (China) Wang	(Ukraine) Kichenok (Ukraine) Kichenok	RR W–L	Set W–L	Game W–L	Standings
1	(Poland) Klaudia Jans-Ignacik (Slovenia) Andreja Klepač		6–7^{(6–8)}, 3–6	6–7^{(3–7)}, 1–6	0–2	0–4	16–26	3
4/WC	(China) Liang Chen (China) Wang Yafan	7–6^{(8–6)}, 6–3		6–7^{(3–7)}, 6–4, [10–6]	2–0	4–1	26–20	1
5	(Ukraine) Lyudmyla Kichenok (Ukraine) Nadiia Kichenok	7–6^{(7–3)}, 6–1	7–6^{(7–3)}, 4–6, [6–10]		1–1	3–2	24–20	2

=== Group B ===
		(Spain) Medina Garrigues (Spain) Parra Santonja	(Canada) Dabrowski (Poland) Rosolska	(China) Xu (China) You	RR W–L	Set W–L	Game W–L	Standings
2	(Spain) Anabel Medina Garrigues (Spain) Arantxa Parra Santonja		6–3, 6–2	1–6, 6–3, [10–3]	2–0	4–1	20–14	1
3	(Canada) Gabriela Dabrowski (Poland) Alicja Rosolska	3–6, 2–6		7–6^{(7–2)}, 4–6, [5–10]	0–2	1–4	16–25	3
6/WC	(China) Xu Shilin (China) You Xiaodi	6–1, 3–6, [3–10]	6–7^{(2–7)}, 6–4, [10–5]		1–1	3–3	22–19	2
