= Nancy Jeffett =

American tennis player and promoter

Nancy Pearce Jeffett (July 16, 1928 – July 6, 2017) was an American tennis promoter, credited with advancing women's tennis as a major professional sport.

Jeffett was born in St. Louis, Missouri, on July 16, 1928. A tennis player during the 1940s, she became one of the country's first woman tennis promoters in 1969 when she created and held the first Maureen Connolly Brinker Memorial Tournament, named in honor of Maureen Connolly. In 1972, she successfully arranged the network television broadcast (on an unknown television network) of the Connolly Brinker Memorial Tournament, marking the first time women's tennis was shown on national television. The tournament was also the first to award prize money.

Jeffett was recognized for her longtime contributions to women's tennis. She was inducted into the Texas Tennis Hall of Fame in 1983, the St. Louis Tennis Hall of Fame in 1999, and the International Tennis Hall of Fame in 2015. She remains the only American woman who was not a Wimbledon champion to be named an honorary member of the All England Lawn Tennis and Croquet Club.

Jeffett died on July 6, 2017, at the age of 88.
