= 2015 Aegon Classic =

- Date: 15–21 June
- Edition: 34th
- Category: WTA Premier
- Draw: 56S / 16D
- Prize money: $731,000
- Surface: Grass
- Location: Birmingham, United Kingdom
- Venue: Edgbaston Priory Club

Champions

Singles
- (Germany) Angelique Kerber

Doubles
- (Spain) Garbiñe Muguruza (Spain) Carla Suárez Navarro
← 2014 ·	Birmingham Classic	· 2016 →

The 2015 Aegon Classic was a women's tennis tournament played on outdoor grass courts. It was the 34th edition of the event, and the second edition of the event as a Premier tournament on the 2015 WTA Tour. It took place at the Edgbaston Priory Club in Birmingham, United Kingdom, from 15 June until 21 June 2015. Fourth-seeded Angelique Kerber won the singles title.

Sabine Lisicki set the WTA Tour record for the most aces hit in a women's singles match at this tournament, hitting 27 aces in her second-round win over Belinda Bencic on 17 June 2015.

== Points and prize money ==
=== Point distribution ===
Event	W	F	SF	QF	Round of 16	Round of 32	Round of 64	Q	Q2	Q1
Singles	470	305	185	100	55	30	1	25	13	1
Doubles	470	305	185	100	1	—	—	—	—	—

=== Prize money ===
Event	W	F	SF	QF	Round of 16	Round of 32	Round of 64	Q2	Q1
Singles	$124,000	$66,000	$32,525	$16,725	$8,670	$4,440	$2,280	$1,035	$620
Doubles	$39,000	$20,650	$11,360	$5,785	$3,140	—	—	—	—

== Singles main draw entrants ==
=== Seeds ===
Country	Player	Rank^{1}	Seed
ROU	Simona Halep	3	1
SRB	Ana Ivanovic	6	2
ESP	Carla Suárez Navarro	9	3
GER	Angelique Kerber	10	4
CAN	Eugenie Bouchard	11	5
CZE	Karolína Plíšková	12	6
GER	Andrea Petkovic	14	7
GER	Sabine Lisicki	19	8
ESP	Garbiñe Muguruza	21	9
CZE	Barbora Strýcová	22	10
FRA	Alizé Cornet	25	11
BLR	Victoria Azarenka	26	12
RUS	Svetlana Kuznetsova	28	13
ROU	Irina-Camelia Begu	29	14
SRB	Jelena Janković	30	15
FRA	Caroline Garcia	31	16

- ^{1} Rankings as of June 8, 2015.

=== Other entrants ===
The following players received wildcards into the main draw:

- (Canada) Eugenie Bouchard
- (United Kingdom) Naomi Broady
- (Serbia) Jelena Janković
- (United Kingdom) Johanna Konta
- (United Kingdom) Katie Swan

The following player received entry using a protected ranking into the main draw:

- (Czech Republic) Petra Cetkovská

The following players received entry from the qualifying draw:

- (Hungary) Tímea Babos
- (Ukraine) Kateryna Bondarenko
- (Japan) Misaki Doi
- (New Zealand) Marina Erakovic
- (Czech Republic) Klára Koukalová
- (Serbia) Aleksandra Krunić
- (Portugal) Michelle Larcher de Brito
- (Germany) Tatjana Maria

The following player received entry as a lucky loser:

- (China) Zheng Saisai

=== Withdrawals ===
Before the tournament

- (Switzerland) Timea Bacsinszky →replaced by (Czech Republic) Tereza Smitková
- (Germany) Mona Barthel →replaced by (Croatia) Ajla Tomljanović
- (United States) Madison Brengle →replaced by (Romania) Monica Niculescu
- (Slovakia) Dominika Cibulková →replaced by (Croatia) Mirjana Lučić-Baroni
- (Italy) Camila Giorgi (right hip injury) →replaced by (China) Zheng Saisai
- (United States) Madison Keys →replaced by (Czech Republic) Kateřina Siniaková
- (China) Peng Shuai →replaced by (United States) Lauren Davis
- (Czech Republic) Lucie Šafářová →replaced by (United States) Christina McHale
- (Kazakhstan) Yaroslava Shvedova →replaced by (Serbia) Bojana Jovanovski

During the tournament

- (Belarus) Victoria Azarenka (left foot injury)

== Doubles main draw entrants ==
=== Seeds ===
Country	Player	Country	Player	Rank^{1}	Seed
AUS	Casey Dellacqua	IND	Sania Mirza	17	1
HUN	Tímea Babos	FRA	Kristina Mladenovic	17	2
USA	Raquel Kops-Jones	USA	Abigail Spears	28	3
ESP	Garbiñe Muguruza	ESP	Carla Suárez Navarro	36	4

- ^{1} Rankings as of June 8, 2015.

=== Other entrants ===
The following pairs received wildcards into the doubles main draw:

- (Canada) Eugenie Bouchard / (Russia) Svetlana Kuznetsova
- (Romania) Simona Halep / (United Kingdom) Heather Watson
- (United Kingdom) Jocelyn Rae / (United Kingdom) Anna Smith

=== Withdrawals ===
During the tournament

- (Romania) Simona Halep (right arm strain)
- (France) Kristina Mladenovic (low back injury)

== Finals ==
=== Singles ===
- (Germany) Angelique Kerber defeated (Czech Republic) Karolína Plíšková, 6–7^{(5–7)}, 6–3, 7–6^{(7–4)}

=== Doubles ===
- (Spain) Garbiñe Muguruza / (Spain) Carla Suárez Navarro defeated (Czech Republic) Andrea Hlaváčková / (Czech Republic) Lucie Hradecká, 6–4, 6–4
