= 2015 Citi Open =

- Date: August 3–9
- Edition: 47th (men) / 5th (women)
- Category: ATP World Tour 500 (men); WTA International (women)
- Surface: Hard / outdoor
- Location: Washington, D.C., United States

Champions

Men's singles
- (Japan) Kei Nishikori

Women's singles
- (United States) Sloane Stephens

Men's doubles
- (United States) Bob Bryan / (United States) Mike Bryan

Women's doubles
- (Switzerland) Belinda Bencic / (France) Kristina Mladenovic
← 2014 ·	Washington Open	· 2016 →

The 2015 Citi Open was a tennis tournament played on outdoor hard courts. It was the 47th edition (for the men) and the 5th edition (for the women) of the Washington Open. The event was part of the ATP World Tour 500 series of the 2015 ATP World Tour, and of the WTA International tournaments of the 2015 WTA Tour. It took place at the William H.G. FitzGerald Tennis Center in Washington, D.C., United States, from August 3 to August 9, 2015.

== Points and prize money ==
=== Point distribution ===
Event	W	F	SF	QF	Round of 16	Round of 32	Round of 64	Q	Q2	Q1
Men's singles	500	300	180	90	45	20	0	10	4	0
Men's doubles	500	300	180	90	0	—	—	10	—	0
Women's singles	280	180	110	60	30	1	—	18	12	1
Women's doubles	280	180	110	60	1	—	—	—	—	—

=== Prize money ===
Event	W	F	SF	QF	Round of 16	Round of 32	Round of 64^{1}	Q2	Q1
Men's singles	$316,400	$142,650	$67,570	$32,605	$16,625	$9,150	$5,325	$850	$440
Men's doubles *	$93,460	$42,180	$19,890	$9,610	$4,920	—	—	—	—
Women's singles	$43,000	$21,400	$11,300	$6,200	$3,420	$2,220	—	$1,285	$750
Women's doubles *	$12,300	$6,400	$3,435	$1,820	$960	—	—	—	—

_{^{1} Qualifiers prize money is also the Round of 64 prize money}
_{* per team}

== ATP singles main-draw entrants ==
=== Seeds ===
Country	Player	Rank^{1}	Seed
GBR	Andy Murray	3	1
JPN	Kei Nishikori	5	2
CRO	Marin Čilić	9	3
FRA	Richard Gasquet	13	4
RSA	Kevin Anderson	15	5
BUL	Grigor Dimitrov	16	6
ESP	Feliciano López	18	7
USA	John Isner	19	8
SRB	Viktor Troicki	20	9
CRO	Ivo Karlović	22	10
AUS	Bernard Tomic	25	11
CAN	Vasek Pospisil	29	12
USA	Sam Querrey	30	13
URU	Pablo Cuevas	31	14
USA	Jack Sock	35	15
ARG	Leonardo Mayer	36	16

- ^{1} Rankings are as of July 27, 2015

=== Other entrants ===
The following players received wild cards into the main singles draw:

- (Germany) Tommy Haas
- (Australia) Lleyton Hewitt
- (Chile) Nicolás Jarry
- (United States) Denis Kudla

The following players received entry from the singles qualifying draw:

- (United States) Ryan Harrison
- (Barbados) Darian King
- (Australia) Marinko Matosevic
- (Japan) Yoshihito Nishioka
- (Argentina) Guido Pella
- (Australia) John-Patrick Smith

The following player received entry as lucky loser:

- (Croatia) Ivan Dodig

=== Withdrawals ===
Before the tournament

- (Cyprus) Marcos Baghdatis → replaced by (Croatia) Ivan Dodig
- (Australia) Thanasi Kokkinakis → replaced by (Japan) Go Soeda
- (France) Adrian Mannarino → replaced by (Slovakia) Lukáš Lacko
- (Serbia) Janko Tipsarević → replaced by (Lithuania) Ričardas Berankis

== ATP doubles main-draw entrants ==
=== Seeds ===
Country	Player	Country	Player	Rank^{1}	Seed
USA	Bob Bryan	USA	Mike Bryan	1	1
CRO	Ivan Dodig	BRA	Marcelo Melo	7	2
IND	Rohan Bopanna	ROU	Florin Mergea	18	3
POL	Marcin Matkowski	SRB	Nenad Zimonjić	21	4

- ^{1} Rankings are as of July 27, 2015

=== Other entrants ===
The following pairs received wildcards into the doubles main draw:

- (Australia) Sam Groth / (Australia) Lleyton Hewitt
- (United States) Steve Johnson / (United States) Sam Querrey

The following pair received entry from the doubles qualifying draw:

- (United States) Austin Krajicek / (United States) Nicholas Monroe

The following pair received entry as lucky loser:

- (Philippines) Treat Huey / (United States) Scott Lipsky

=== Withdrawals ===
Before the tournament

- (Uruguay) Pablo Cuevas (back injury)

== WTA singles main-draw entrants ==
=== Seeds ===
Country	Player	Rank ^{1}	Seed
RUS	Ekaterina Makarova	11	1
AUS	Samantha Stosur	21	2
SUI	Belinda Bencic	22	3
RUS	Svetlana Kuznetsova	24	4
FRA	Alizé Cornet	28	5
ROU	Irina-Camelia Begu	29	6
USA	CoCo Vandeweghe	32	7
KAZ	Zarina Diyas	33	8

- ^{1} Rankings are as of July 27, 2015

=== Other entrants ===
The following players received wild cards into the main singles draw:

- (United States) Louisa Chirico
- (United States) Taylor Townsend
- (United States) CoCo Vandeweghe

The following players received entry from the singles qualifying draw:

- (United Kingdom) Naomi Broady
- (Israel) Julia Glushko
- (United States) Sanaz Marand
- (Belgium) An-Sophie Mestach

=== Withdrawals ===
Before the tournament

- (Belarus) Victoria Azarenka → replaced by (Slovenia) Polona Hercog
- (Canada) Eugenie Bouchard → replaced by (United States) Lauren Davis
- (Italy) Sara Errani → replaced by (United States) Irina Falconi
- (Slovakia) Daniela Hantuchová → replaced by (Spain) Lara Arruabarrena

== WTA doubles main-draw entrants ==
=== Seeds ===
Country	Player	Country	Player	Rank^{1}	Seed
RUS	Alla Kudryavtseva	RUS	Anastasia Pavlyuchenkova	52	1
AUS	Anastasia Rodionova	AUS	Arina Rodionova	64	2
ESP	Lara Arruabarrena	SLO	Andreja Klepač	72	3
SUI	Belinda Bencic	FRA	Kristina Mladenovic	101	4

- ^{1} Rankings are as of July 27, 2015

=== Other entrants ===
The following pair received a wildcard into the doubles main draw:

- (United States) Louisa Chirico / (France) Alizé Lim

== Champions ==
=== Men's singles ===
- (Japan) Kei Nishikori def. (United States) John Isner, 4–6, 6–4, 6–4

=== Women's singles ===
- (United States) Sloane Stephens def. (Russia) Anastasia Pavlyuchenkova, 6–1, 6–2

=== Men's doubles ===
- (United States) Bob Bryan / (United States) Mike Bryan def. (Croatia) Ivan Dodig / (Brazil) Marcelo Melo, 6–4, 6–2

=== Women's doubles ===
- (Switzerland) Belinda Bencic / (France) Kristina Mladenovic def. (Spain) Lara Arruabarrena / (Slovenia) Andreja Klepač, 7–5, 7–6^{(9–7)}
