= 2015 Wuhan Open =

- Date: September 27 – October 3
- Edition: 2nd
- Category: WTA Premier 5
- Draw: 56S / 28D
- Prize money: $2,513,000
- Surface: Hard / outdoor
- Location: Wuhan, China
- Venue: Optics Valley Int'l Tennis Center

Champions

Singles
- (United States) Venus Williams

Doubles
- (Switzerland) Martina Hingis / (India) Sania Mirza
← 2014 ·	Wuhan Open	· 2016 →

The 2015 Wuhan Open (also known as 2015 Dongfeng Motor Wuhan Open for sponsorship reasons) was a women's tennis tournament played on outdoor hard courts between September 27 and October 3, 2015. It was part of the WTA Premier 5 tournaments of the 2015 WTA Tour. The 2015 tournament was the 2nd edition of the Wuhan Open. The tournament was held at the Optics Valley International Tennis Center in Wuhan, China.

== Points and prize money ==
=== Point distribution ===
Event	W	F	SF	QF	Round of 16	Round of 32	Round of 64	Q	Q2	Q1
Singles	900	585	350	190	105	60	1	30	20	1
Doubles	900	585	350	190	105	1	—	—	—	—

=== Prize money ===
Event	W	F	SF	QF	Round of 16	Round of 32	Round of 64	Q2	Q1
Singles	$456,000	$227,700	$113,860	$52,430	$26,000	$13,335	$6,855	$3,825	$1,970
Doubles	$130,300	$65,930	$32,250	$16,425	$8,320	$4,115	—	—	—

== Singles main-draw entrants ==
=== Seeds ===
Country	Player	Ranking	Seeds
ROU	Simona Halep	2	1
RUS	Maria Sharapova	3	2
CZE	Petra Kvitová	4	3
DEN	Caroline Wozniacki	6	4
ESP	Garbiñe Muguruza	8	5
GER	Angelique Kerber	9	6
ESP	Carla Suárez Navarro	10	7
CZE	Karolína Plíšková	11	8
SRB	Ana Ivanovic	12	9
POL	Agnieszka Radwańska	13	10
SUI	Belinda Bencic	15	11
UKR	Elina Svitolina	16	12
GER	Andrea Petkovic	17	13
USA	Madison Keys	18	14
ITA	Roberta Vinci	19	15
ITA	Sara Errani	21	16

- Rankings are as of September 21, 2015

=== Other entrants ===
The following players received wild cards into the main singles draw:

- (Slovakia) Daniela Hantuchová
- (China) Liu Fangzhou
- (Russia) Maria Sharapova
- (China) Zheng Saisai

The following player received entry using a protected ranking into the main singles draw:

- (Slovakia) Dominika Cibulková

The following players received entry from the singles qualifying draw:

- (Hungary) Tímea Babos
- (United States) Lauren Davis
- (Colombia) Mariana Duque Mariño
- (Germany) Julia Görges
- (United Kingdom) Johanna Konta
- (Montenegro) Danka Kovinić
- (Romania) Patricia Maria Țig
- (United Kingdom) Heather Watson

The following players received entry as a lucky loser:

- (Croatia) Ajla Tomljanović

=== Withdrawals ===
Before the tournament

- (Switzerland) Timea Bacsinszky → replaced by (United States) Alison Riske
- (Canada) Eugenie Bouchard (ongoing concussion) → replaced by (Croatia) Ajla Tomljanović
- (Italy) Karin Knapp → replaced by (Romania) Alexandra Dulgheru
- (Russia) Ekaterina Makarova (leg injury) → (Romania) replaced by Varvara Lepchenko
- (Italy) Flavia Pennetta → replaced by (Croatia) Mirjana Lučić-Baroni
- (Czech Republic) Lucie Šafářová (bacterial infection and belly muscle injury) → replaced by (Slovakia) Magdaléna Rybáriková

=== Retirements ===
- (Belarus) Victoria Azarenka (left leg injury)
- (Switzerland) Belinda Bencic (left thigh injury)
- (Spain) Garbiñe Muguruza (left ankle injury and gastrointestinal illness)
- (Russia) Maria Sharapova (left forearm injury)
- (United States) CoCo Vandeweghe (left ankle injury)

== Doubles main-draw entrants ==
=== Seeds ===
Country	Player	Country	Player	Rank^{1}	Seed
SUI	Martina Hingis	IND	Sania Mirza	3	1
HUN	Tímea Babos	FRA	Kristina Mladenovic	19	2
FRA	Caroline Garcia	SLO	Katarina Srebotnik	25	3
TPE	Chan Hao-Ching	TPE	Chan Yung-Jan	3-	4
USA	Raquel Kops-Jones	USA	Abigail Spears	32	5
CZE	Andrea Hlaváčková	CZE	Lucie Hradecká	37	6
ESP	Garbiñe Muguruza	ESP	Carla Suárez Navarro	46	7
TPE	Chuang Chia-jung	TPE	Hsieh Su-wei	60	8

- Rankings are as of September 21, 2015

=== Other entrants ===
The following pairs received a wildcard into the doubles main draw:

- (China) Liu Chang / (China) Yang Zhaoxuan

The following pair received entry as alternates:

- (Germany) Mona Barthel / (Croatia) Darija Jurak

=== Withdrawals ===
Before the tournament

- (Switzerland) Belinda Bencic (Left Thigh Injury)

During the tournament

- (Spain) Garbiñe Muguruza (Gastrointestinal Illness And Left Ankle Injury)
- (Croatia) Ajla Tomljanović (Right Shoulder Injury)

== Champions ==
=== Singles ===
- (United States) Venus Williams def. (Spain) Garbiñe Muguruza, 6-3 3-0 Retired

=== Doubles ===
- (Switzerland) Martina Hingis / (India) Sania Mirza def. (Romania) Irina-Camelia Begu / (Romania) Monica Niculescu, 6-2 6-3
