= 2015 Grand Prix SAR La Princesse Lalla Meryem =

- Date: 26 April – 2 May
- Edition: 15th
- Category: WTA International
- Draw: 32S / 16D
- Prize money: $250,000
- Surface: Clay / outdoor
- Location: Marrakesh, Morocco
- Venue: Royal Tennis Club de Marrakech

Champions

Singles
- (Ukraine) Elina Svitolina

Doubles
- (Hungary) Tímea Babos / (France) Kristina Mladenovic
- Morocco Open

The 2015 Grand Prix SAR La Princesse Lalla Meryem was a professional tennis tournament played on clay courts. It was the 15th edition of the tournament and part of the WTA International tournaments category of the 2015 WTA Tour. It took place at the Royal Tennis Club de Marrakech in Marrakesh, Morocco, between 26 April and 2 May 2015.

== Points and prize money ==
=== Point distribution ===
Event	W	F	SF	QF	Round of 16	Round of 32	Q	Q3	Q2	Q1
Women's singles	280	180	110	60	30	1	18	14	10	1
Women's doubles	280	180	110	60	1	—N/a	—N/a	—N/a	—N/a	—N/a

=== Prize money ===
Event	W	F	SF	QF	Round of 16	Round of 32	Round of 64	Q2	Q1
Women's singles	$43,000	$21,400	$11,300	$5,900	$3,310	$1,925	$1,005	$730	$530
Women's doubles	$12,300	$6,400	$3,435	$1,820	$960	—N/a	—N/a	—N/a	—N/a

== Singles main-draw entrants ==
=== Seeds ===
Country	Player	Rank^{1}	Seed
ESP	Garbiñe Muguruza	20	1
SUI	Timea Bacsinszky	22	2
ITA	Flavia Pennetta	26	3
UKR	Elina Svitolina	27	4
GER	Mona Barthel	39	5
ITA	Roberta Vinci	41	6
SVK	Anna Karolína Schmiedlová	46	7
PUR	Monica Puig	47	8

- ^{1} Rankings as of April 20, 2015

=== Other entrants ===
The following players received wildcards into the singles main draw:

- (Morocco) Rita Atik
- (Russia) Daria Kasatkina
- (Spain) Garbiñe Muguruza

The following players received entry as qualifiers:

- (Argentina) María Irigoyen
- (Brazil) Teliana Pereira
- (Germany) Laura Siegemund
- (Belgium) Alison Van Uytvanck

The following player received entry as a lucky loser:

- (Poland) Urszula Radwańska

=== Withdrawals ===
Before the tournament

- (Netherlands) Kiki Bertens → replaced by Lara Arruabarrena
- (Kazakhstan) Zarina Diyas → replaced by Tímea Babos
- (Romania) Alexandra Dulgheru → replaced by Donna Vekić
- (Belgium) Kirsten Flipkens → replaced by Evgeniya Rodina
- (Sweden) Johanna Larsson → replaced by Tatjana Maria
- (Italy) Francesca Schiavone (illness) → replaced by Urszula Radwańska
- (China) Peng Shuai → replaced by Marina Erakovic

== Doubles main-draw entrants ==
=== Seeds ===
Country	Player	Country	Player	Rank^{1}	Seed
HUN	Tímea Babos	FRA	Kristina Mladenovic	28	1
CRO	Darija Jurak	ESP	Arantxa Parra Santonja	81	2
RUS	Alexandra Panova	CZE	Renata Voráčová	92	3
ROU	Raluca Olaru	ESP	Sílvia Soler Espinosa	124	4

- ^{1} Rankings as of April 20, 2015

=== Other entrants ===
The following pairs received wildcards into the doubles main draw:

- (Morocco) Rita Atik / (Morocco) Zaineb El Houari
- (Morocco) Ghita Benhadi / (South Africa) Ilze Hattingh

== Champions ==
=== Singles ===
- (Ukraine) Elina Svitolina def. (Hungary) Tímea Babos, 7–5, 7–6^{(7–3)}

=== Doubles ===
- (Hungary) Tímea Babos / (France) Kristina Mladenovic def. (Germany) Laura Siegemund / (Ukraine) Maryna Zanevska, 6–1, 7–6^{(7–5)}
