= 2015 Family Circle Cup =

- Date: April 6–12
- Edition: 43rd
- Category: WTA Premier
- Draw: 56S / 16D
- Prize money: $731,000
- Surface: Clay / outdoor
- Location: Charleston, United States
- Venue: Family Circle Tennis Center
- Attendance: 86,176

Champions

Singles
- (Germany) Angelique Kerber

Doubles
- (Switzerland) Martina Hingis / (India) Sania Mirza
← 2014 ·	Charleston Open	· 2016 →

The 2015 Family Circle Cup was a women's tennis event on the 2015 WTA Tour. It took place between April 6–12, 2015. It was the 43rd edition of the tournament and a Premier level tournament. The event was hosted at the Family Circle Tennis Center, on Daniel Island, Charleston, United States. It was the only event of the clay court season played on green clay.

== Finals ==
=== Singles ===
- (Germany) Angelique Kerber defeated (United States) Madison Keys, 6–2, 4–6, 7–5

=== Doubles ===
- (Switzerland) Martina Hingis / (India) Sania Mirza defeated (Australia) Casey Dellacqua / (Croatia) Darija Jurak, 6–0, 6–4

== Points and prize money ==
=== Point distribution ===
Event	W	F	SF	QF	Round of 16	Round of 32	Round of 64	Q	Q2	Q1
Singles	470	305	185	100	55	30	1	25	13	1
Doubles	470	305	185	100	1	—	—	—	—	—

=== Prize money ===
Event	W	F	SF	QF	Round of 16	Round of 32	Round of 64	Q2	Q1
Singles	$124,000	$66,000	$32,525	$16,725	$8,670	$4,440	$2,280	$1,035	$620
Doubles	$39,000	$20,650	$11,360	$5,785	$3,140	—	—	—	—

== Singles main draw entrants ==
=== Seeds ===
Country	Player	Ranking^{1}	Seed
CAN	Eugenie Bouchard	7	1
RUS	Ekaterina Makarova	9	2
GER	Andrea Petkovic	10	3
ITA	Sara Errani	13	4
GER	Angelique Kerber	15	5
SRB	Jelena Janković	17	6
USA	Madison Keys	18	7
FRA	Caroline Garcia	25	8
AUS	Samantha Stosur	26	9
USA	Varvara Lepchenko	31	10
KAZ	Zarina Diyas	32	11
SUI	Belinda Bencic	34	12
ROU	Irina-Camelia Begu	35	13
RUS	Anastasia Pavlyuchenkova	38	14
GER	Mona Barthel	39	15
GBR	Heather Watson	41	16

- ^{1} Rankings as of 23 March 2015.

=== Other entrants ===
The following players received wildcards into the main draw:

- (Canada) Eugenie Bouchard
- (United States) Varvara Lepchenko
- (United States) Bethanie Mattek-Sands
- (United States) Sachia Vickery

The following player received entry using a protected ranking into the main draw:

- (Romania) Edina Gallovits-Hall

The following players received entry from the qualifying draw:

- (Ukraine) Kateryna Bondarenko
- (Czech Republic) Lucie Hradecká
- (Bulgaria) Sesil Karatancheva
- (Montenegro) Danka Kovinić
- (Slovakia) Kristína Kučová
- (United States) Jessica Pegula
- (Germany) Laura Siegemund
- (Spain) Sara Sorribes Tormo

=== Withdrawals ===
Before the tournament

- (Australia) Jarmila Gajdošová →replaced by (Switzerland) Stefanie Vögele
- (Germany) Sabine Lisicki →replaced by (Romania) Andreea Mitu
- (China) Peng Shuai →replaced by (United States) Grace Min
- (Czech Republic) Lucie Šafářová →replaced by (Turkey) Çağla Büyükakçay
- (Ukraine) Lesia Tsurenko →replaced by (Russia) Evgeniya Rodina
- (United States) Taylor Townsend →replaced by (Germany) Tatjana Maria
- (Czech Republic) Barbora Záhlavová-Strýcová →replaced by (Romania) Edina Gallovits-Hall
- (China) Zheng Saisai →replaced by (United States) Irina Falconi

During the tournament

- (Serbia) Jelena Janković (right foot injury)
- (Russia) Ekaterina Makarova (gastrointestinal illness)

=== Retirements ===
- (Germany) Mona Barthel (dizziness)
- (United States) Varvara Lepchenko (lower back injury)
- (Russia) Anastasia Pavlyuchenkova (left shoulder injury)

== Doubles main draw entrants ==
=== Seeds ===
Country	Player	Country	Player	Rank^{1}	Seed
SUI	Martina Hingis	IND	Sania Mirza	8	1
USA	Raquel Kops-Jones	USA	Abigail Spears	20	2
TPE	Chan Hao-ching	TPE	Chan Yung-jan	52	3
HUN	Tímea Babos	GER	Anna-Lena Grönefeld	55	4

- ^{1} Rankings as of March 23, 2015.

=== Other entrants ===
The following pairs received wildcards into the doubles main draw:

- (United States) Madison Keys / (United States) Lisa Raymond
- (United States) Alison Riske / (United States) Shelby Rogers
