= 2015 Maria Sharapova tennis season =

- Full name: Maria Yuryevna Sharapova
- Country: Russia
- Calendar prize money: $3,285,949

Singles
- Season record: 39–9
- Calendar titles: 2
- Current ranking: No. 4
- Ranking change from previous year: ▼ -2

Grand Slam & significant results
- Australian Open: F
- French Open: 4R
- Wimbledon: SF
- US Open: DNP
- Last updated on: 13 July 2015.

The 2015 Maria Sharapova tennis season officially began on 4 January 2015 with the start of the 2015 WTA Tour. Sharapova entered the season ranked as world number 2 behind Serena Williams following the completion of the 2014 season.

== Year in detail ==
=== Early hard court season and Australian Open ===
==== Brisbane International ====
For the second consecutive year, Sharapova began her season at the Brisbane International, a Premier level tournament on the WTA Tour. As the top seed, Sharapova was given a bye in the first round. Her first match of the 2015 season came against qualifier Yaroslava Shvedova, with Sharapova winning the first nine games on her way to an easy victory. Sharapova's quarterfinal match pitted her against number one Spaniard Carla Suárez Navarro, with the Russian winning comfortably in straight sets. She then repeated her quarterfinal scoreline in her semifinal match, beating Elina Svitolina to advance to her first final of 2015. In the final, Sharapova faced world number 7 and second seed Ana Ivanovic. Sharapova took an early break, but failed to convert two set points and eventually lost the tie-break to Ivanovic. She then rebounded to claim the second and third sets to claim her 34th WTA Tour title, and first in Brisbane.

==== Australian Open ====
Sharapova's next tournament was the first major of the year, the Australian Open. She was seeded second in the draw, defending fourth round points after losing in 2014 to Dominika Cibulková. In the first round, Sharapova drew Croatian qualifier Petra Martić and won in straight sets. In the second round, Sharapova beat qualifier and fellow countrywoman Alexandra Panova in three sets, despite being down two breaks and saving two match points in the final set. Following her close call with elimination, Sharapova rebounded to win her next two matches in straight sets over Zarina Diyas and Peng Shuai. In the quarterfinals, Sharapova continued her strong form by seeing off world No. 7 Eugenie Bouchard in two sets. Playing in her third Australian Open semifinal in four years, Sharapova made short work of her compatriot and 10th seed Ekaterina Makarova, setting up a final with world number one Serena Williams. The final was a tight contest between the top 2 players in the world, but Sharapova failed to recover from being broken in the opening game, and lost the first set. Sharapova stepped up her play in the second set, and saved two match points to force a tie-break, but in the end, Williams closed the match with an ace, sealing a two set victory. The defeat was Sharapova's third in a Grand Slam final to Williams, and the first of her 2015 season.

==== Fed Cup World Group – Quarterfinals ====
One week following her disappointment in the Australian Open final, Sharapova returned to play at the Fed Cup, being selected as part of the Russia team in their quarterfinal tie with Poland in Kraków. It was the first time Sharapova had participated in a Fed Cup tie since Russia's 2012 victory over Spain. Following Svetlana Kuznetsova's first rubber victory, Sharapova played the second rubber against Urszula Radwańska and made short work of her opponent, winning in straight sets to give Russia a 2–0 advantage. The following day, Sharapova returned to play the third rubber against Urszula's sister Agnieszka Radwańska, and defeated the world #8 in straight sets, sealing victory for the Russian team.

==== Mexican Open ====
Sharapova's next activity came at the tournament in Acapulco. It was the first time she had competed in an International tournament since losing to Gréta Arn at the Auckland event in early 2011. Sharapova entered the draw as top seed, and faced American Shelby Rogers in the first round, winning in straight sets. Next, she faced lucky loser Mariana Duque Mariño and won in 68 minutes. In the quarterfinals, Sharapova faced Magdaléna Rybáriková for the first time. She won in three sets, despite struggling with a stomach virus. Sharapova was expected to face Caroline Garcia in the semifinals, but withdrew on the morning of the match due to the virus, giving Garcia a walkover into the final.

==== Indian Wells Masters ====
Sharapova returned to action in March, competing in Indian Wells. She was seeded second, only defending third rounds after a surprise loss to Camila Giorgi in 2014. After receiving a bye in the first round, Sharapova faced Yanina Wickmayer and won in straight sets. In the third round, she faced former world #1 Victoria Azarenka for the first time since the 2013 French Open. After two close sets and five missed match points, Sharapova prevailed, tying her career record against Azarenka to seven wins each. She failed to progress deeper into the tournament when she lost to defending champion Flavia Pennetta in the fourth round in three sets.

==== Miami Open ====
Sharapova's next tournament was in Miami. She was seeded second, defending semifinalist points after losing to eventual champion Serena Williams in 2014. After receiving a bye in the first round, Sharapova faced Daria Gavrilova and lost in straight sets. This marked the first time that Sharapova did not make it to the third round since her first appearance at the tournament back in 2003.

=== European clay court season and French Open ===
==== Stuttgart Open ====
As she had done in the previous three years, Sharapova began her clay-court season at Stuttgart, an event she had won on all three occasions that she had entered. She was seeded first, and received a first round bye. In the second round, she drew Angelique Kerber, and despite winning the first set, fell to her third consecutive defeat. The loss also snapped a 64 match win streak on clay where Sharapova won the first set and went on to win the match. The last time Sharapova lost a match on clay after winning the first set was against Dinara Safina in the fourth round at the 2008 French Open. Following the defeat, Sharapova dropped to third in the WTA rankings behind Simona Halep.

==== Madrid Open ====
Having lost her last three matches, Sharapova next entered the 2015 Mutua Madrid Open, where she was the defending champion. Seeded third, she faced a potentially tricky first round tie against Timea Bacsinszky, but won comfortably in straight sets, snapping her losing streak and avenging a defeat to Bacsinszky in Wuhan in late 2014. Sharapova followed up her first round win by claiming victory over Mariana Duque Mariño for the second time in 2015, and then reached the quarterfinals by defeating Caroline Garcia in a tough three set match. In the quarterfinals, Sharapova faced world No. 5 Caroline Wozniacki having lost both of her meetings with the Dane in 2014, but this time emerged victorious in three-sets to set up a semifinal showdown with Svetlana Kuznetsova. In the semifinal Sharapova's return to form came to an abrupt end, losing to Kuznetsova in straight sets. It was her first defeat to Kuznetsova in over seven years.

==== Italian Open ====
Immediately following her defeat in Madrid, Sharapova travelled to Italy to compete in the WTA Premier Five tournament in Rome. She was seeded third, defending third round points following an early defeat to Ana Ivanovic in 2014. After a first round bye, Sharapova was leading her second round match when her opponent Jarmila Gajdošová retired with a shoulder injury. She then proceeded to the quarterfinals with a straight sets win over Bojana Jovanovski, setting up a meeting with former No. 1 Victoria Azarenka. Sharapova prevailed in two sets, earning her second win of the season over Azarenka, and taking the lead 8–7 in their overall head-to-head record. In the semifinals, Sharapova faced a rematch with Daria Gavrilova, having suffered a surprise defeat to her earlier in the year in Miami. This time however, Sharapova took revenge on the Russian qualifier, winning a close two-set match to advance to her third Rome final in five years. There, she faced Carla Suárez Navarro for the title, and despite dropping the first set, rebounded to claim the title, winning the last six games. The title was her eleventh on clay courts (tying her with Serena Williams for the most clay court titles of active players.) In addition, by virtue of reaching the final, coupled with Simona Halep's defeat in the semifinals, Sharapova returned to #2 in the WTA rankings, ensuring her position as the second seed at the French Open.

==== French Open ====
Sharapova concluded her clay-court season at the French Open, returning as the defending champion following her victory over Simona Halep in the 2014 final. Seeded second, she faced a potentially tricky first round tie against Kaia Kanepi, but in spite of suffering from an illness, emerged with a straight sets victory. She followed up by defeating compatriot Vitalia Diatchenko in the second round, again in straight sets, setting up a third round clash with Samantha Stosur – a rematch following their three-set fourth round clash in 2014. Sharapova prevailed in straight sets. In the fourth round, Sharapova met 13th seed Lucie Šafářová and was upset in straight sets. The defeat saw the end of her title defence, and was her earliest loss in the French Open since a third round exit against Justine Henin in 2010.

=== Grasscourt Season ===
==== Wimbledon ====
After opting not to play in any warm-up events, Sharapova made her only appearance of the grasscourt season at Wimbledon, where she was seeded fourth. She began her campaign in straightforward fashion, defeating local Wildcard Johanna Konta and qualifier Richèl Hogenkamp in the first and second rounds respectively. Sharapova's run continued with victory over Irina-Camelia Begu in the third round, defending her points earned in the 2014 tournament. Following the traditional Sunday rest day, Sharapova returned by defeating Zarina Diyas in straight sets in the fourth round, and advanced to the semifinals with a three set victory over American CoCo Vandeweghe in the quarterfinals. In her first Wimbledon semifinal since 2011, Sharapova faced top seed Serena Williams, but lost in straight sets. It was her 17th consecutive loss to the American, and second of the year at Grand Slam level.

=== Summer US Open series ===
Sharapova was scheduled to play three events during the Summer US Open series – the Rogers Cup in Toronto, the Western & Southern Open in Cincinnati and the US Open. However, she announced her withdrawal from both warm-up events with a right leg injury. Sharapova was drawn to face Daria Gavrilova for the third time in 2015 at the US Open, however she announced her withdrawal from the event one night before the tournament began. Her place in the main draw was given to lucky loser Daria Kasatkina.

=== Fall Asian hardcourt season ===
==== Wuhan Open ====
Having not competed since her Wimbledon semifinal defeat, Sharapova made her return to the tour in late September, accepting a wildcard into the main draw at the Wuhan Open. Seeded second, Sharapova received a bye into the second round where she met Barbora Strýcová. However, while leading 2–1 in the final set, Sharapova retired from the match, citing a left forearm injury.

==== China Open ====
Following her retirement in Wuhan, Sharapova announced her withdrawal from the following weeks China Open. She had been the defending champion at the event, but opted to withdraw to improve her chances of competing in the 2015 WTA Finals in Singapore and the Fed Cup Final in Prague.

=== WTA Finals ===
Despite her lack of activity, Sharapova officially qualified for the 2015 WTA Finals in Singapore on September 10. She was seeded third behind Simona Halep and Garbiñe Muguruza, and was placed in the red group alongside Halep, Agnieszka Radwańska and US Open champion, Flavia Pennetta. Despite playing down her chances before the tournament began, Sharapova began the group stage with a three set win over Radwańska to earn her first tour win since July. She then continued her head-to-head dominance over Halep with a straight sets victory, leaving qualification for the semifinals in her own hands going into the final match of the group stage. Following Radwańska's victory over Halep, Sharapova entered final group match against Pennetta assured of qualification regardless of the result, but nevertheless she recorded a straight sets victory, completing the group stage with a 3–0 record and pushing Pennetta into retirement. Sharapova had lost their last three encounters; it was her first win over the Italian since 2006 as well as their first match up decided in straight sets. The victory tied Sharapova's career record against Pennetta to 3–3. Prior to this, Pennetta had been the only player present at the event to hold a winning record over Sharapova. In the semifinal, Sharapova looked to avenge a 2014 group stage defeat to Petra Kvitová at the same venue, but lost in straight sets, despite taking a big lead in the second set. Following her semifinal defeat, Sharapova finished the year ranked #4, a drop of two places from 2014.

=== Fed Cup Final ===
Sharapova concluded her season by leading Russia in the Fed Cup final against the Czech Republic away in Prague. Though she had participated in the Russian team's 2008 title winning run, Sharapova had missed the final through injury, thus making this her first appearance in a Fed Cup final. Following her teammate Anastasia Pavlyuchenkova's three set defeat to Petra Kvitová, Sharapova competed in the second rubber against world #11 Karolína Plíšková. In her first career meeting with her opponent, Sharapova claimed a straight set victories, levelling the tie at 1–1 at the end of the first day. Sharapova returned for the third rubber the following morning, looking to avenge her recent Year End Championships defeat to Kvitová. This time, Sharapova prevailed, coming back from a set down to clinch a three set victory. The win gave Russia a 2–1 lead in the tie, and signalled the end of Sharapova's 2015 season. Unfortunately for the Russian team, Sharapova's victories would be the only ones for the team, with Pavlyuchenkova losing in singles to Plíšková, then losing to Plíšková and Barbora Strýcová in the decisive doubles tie with Elena Vesnina

== All matches ==
Tournament	Match	Round	Opponent	Rank	Result	Score
Brisbane International; Brisbane, Australia; WTA Premier; Hard, outdoor 4–10 January 2015	–	1R	Bye			
Brisbane International; Brisbane, Australia; WTA Premier; Hard, outdoor 4–10 January 2015	1	2R	(Kazakhstan) Yaroslava Shvedova	#66	Win	6–0, 6–1
Brisbane International; Brisbane, Australia; WTA Premier; Hard, outdoor 4–10 January 2015	2	QF	(Spain) Carla Suárez Navarro	#17	Win	6–1, 6–3
Brisbane International; Brisbane, Australia; WTA Premier; Hard, outdoor 4–10 January 2015	3	SF	(Ukraine) Elina Svitolina	#28	Win	6–1, 6–3
Brisbane International; Brisbane, Australia; WTA Premier; Hard, outdoor 4–10 January 2015	4	F	(Serbia) Ana Ivanovic	#7	Win (1)	6–7 ^{(4–7)}, 6–3, 6–3
Australian Open; Melbourne, Australia; Grand Slam; Hard, outdoor 19 January – 1 February 2015	5	1R	(Croatia) Petra Martić	#184	Win	6–4, 6–1
Australian Open; Melbourne, Australia; Grand Slam; Hard, outdoor 19 January – 1 February 2015	6	2R	(Russia) Alexandra Panova	#150	Win	6–1, 4–6, 7–5
Australian Open; Melbourne, Australia; Grand Slam; Hard, outdoor 19 January – 1 February 2015	7	3R	(Kazakhstan) Zarina Diyas	#31	Win	6–1, 6–1
Australian Open; Melbourne, Australia; Grand Slam; Hard, outdoor 19 January – 1 February 2015	8	4R	(China) Peng Shuai	#21	Win	6–3, 6–0
Australian Open; Melbourne, Australia; Grand Slam; Hard, outdoor 19 January – 1 February 2015	9	QF	(Canada) Eugenie Bouchard	#7	Win	6–3, 6–2
Australian Open; Melbourne, Australia; Grand Slam; Hard, outdoor 19 January – 1 February 2015	10	SF	(Russia) Ekaterina Makarova	#11	Win	6–3, 6–2
Australian Open; Melbourne, Australia; Grand Slam; Hard, outdoor 19 January – 1 February 2015	11	F	(United States) Serena Williams	#1	Loss (1)	3–6, 6–7^{(5–7)}
Fed Cup WG: Russia vs. Poland; Kraków, Poland; Fed Cup; Hard, indoor 7–8 February 2015	12	–	(Poland) Urszula Radwańska	#135	Win	6–0, 6–3
Fed Cup WG: Russia vs. Poland; Kraków, Poland; Fed Cup; Hard, indoor 7–8 February 2015	13	–	(Poland) Agnieszka Radwańska	#8	Win	6–1, 7–5
Abierto Mexicano Telcel; Acapulco, Mexico; WTA International; Hard, outdoor 23 February – 1 March 2015	14	1R	(United States) Shelby Rogers	#80	Win	6–4, 6–1
Abierto Mexicano Telcel; Acapulco, Mexico; WTA International; Hard, outdoor 23 February – 1 March 2015	15	2R	(Colombia) Mariana Duque Mariño	#139	Win	6–1, 6–2
Abierto Mexicano Telcel; Acapulco, Mexico; WTA International; Hard, outdoor 23 February – 1 March 2015	16	QF	(Slovakia) Magdaléna Rybáriková	#50	Win	6–1, 4–6, 6–2
Abierto Mexicano Telcel; Acapulco, Mexico; WTA International; Hard, outdoor 23 February – 1 March 2015	–	SF	(France) Caroline Garcia	#30	Withdrew	Walkover
BNP Paribas Open; Indian Wells, United States; WTA Premier Mandatory; Hard, outdoor 9–22 March 2015	–	1R	Bye			
BNP Paribas Open; Indian Wells, United States; WTA Premier Mandatory; Hard, outdoor 9–22 March 2015	17	2R	(Belgium) Yanina Wickmayer	#93	Win	6–1, 7–5
BNP Paribas Open; Indian Wells, United States; WTA Premier Mandatory; Hard, outdoor 9–22 March 2015	18	3R	(Belarus) Victoria Azarenka	#38	Win	6–4, 6–3
BNP Paribas Open; Indian Wells, United States; WTA Premier Mandatory; Hard, outdoor 9–22 March 2015	19	4R	(Italy) Flavia Pennetta	#16	Loss	6–3, 3–6, 2–6
Miami Open; Miami, United States; WTA Premier Mandatory; Hard, outdoor 24 March – 4 April 2015	–	1R	Bye			
Miami Open; Miami, United States; WTA Premier Mandatory; Hard, outdoor 24 March – 4 April 2015	20	2R	(Russia) Daria Gavrilova	#97	Loss	6–7^{(4–7)}, 3–6
Porsche Tennis Grand Prix; Stuttgart, Germany; WTA Premier; Clay, indoor 20–26 April 2015	–	1R	Bye			
Porsche Tennis Grand Prix; Stuttgart, Germany; WTA Premier; Clay, indoor 20–26 April 2015	21	2R	(Germany) Angelique Kerber	#14	Loss	6–2, 5–7, 1–6
Mutua Madrid Open; Madrid, Spain; WTA Premier Mandatory; Clay, outdoor 1–10 May 2015	22	1R	(Switzerland) Timea Bacsinszky	#21	Win	6–2, 6–3
Mutua Madrid Open; Madrid, Spain; WTA Premier Mandatory; Clay, outdoor 1–10 May 2015	23	2R	(Colombia) Mariana Duque Mariño	#110	Win	6–1, 6–2
Mutua Madrid Open; Madrid, Spain; WTA Premier Mandatory; Clay, outdoor 1–10 May 2015	24	3R	(France) Caroline Garcia	#28	Win	6–2, 4–6, 7–5
Mutua Madrid Open; Madrid, Spain; WTA Premier Mandatory; Clay, outdoor 1–10 May 2015	25	QF	(Denmark) Caroline Wozniacki	#5	Win	6–1, 3–6, 6–3
Mutua Madrid Open; Madrid, Spain; WTA Premier Mandatory; Clay, outdoor 1–10 May 2015	26	SF	(Russia) Svetlana Kuznetsova	#29	Loss	2–6, 4–6
Italian Open; Rome, Italy; WTA Premier Five; Clay, outdoor 11–17 May 2015	–	1R	Bye			
Italian Open; Rome, Italy; WTA Premier Five; Clay, outdoor 11–17 May 2015	27	2R	(Australia) Jarmila Gajdošová	#51	Win	6–2, 3–1 ret.
Italian Open; Rome, Italy; WTA Premier Five; Clay, outdoor 11–17 May 2015	28	3R	(Serbia) Bojana Jovanovski	#73	Win	6–3, 6–3
Italian Open; Rome, Italy; WTA Premier Five; Clay, outdoor 11–17 May 2015	29	QF	(Belarus) Victoria Azarenka	#29	Win	6–3, 6–2
Italian Open; Rome, Italy; WTA Premier Five; Clay, outdoor 11–17 May 2015	30	SF	(Russia) Daria Gavrilova	#78	Win	7–5, 6–3
Italian Open; Rome, Italy; WTA Premier Five; Clay, outdoor 11–17 May 2015	31	F	(Spain) Carla Suárez Navarro	#10	Win (2)	4–6, 7–5, 6–1
French Open; Paris, France; Grand Slam; Clay, outdoor 24 May – 7 June 2015	32	1R	(Estonia) Kaia Kanepi	#50	Win	6–2, 6–4
French Open; Paris, France; Grand Slam; Clay, outdoor 24 May – 7 June 2015	33	2R	(Russia) Vitalia Diatchenko	#91	Win	6–3, 6–1
French Open; Paris, France; Grand Slam; Clay, outdoor 24 May – 7 June 2015	34	3R	(Australia) Samantha Stosur	#22	Win	6–3, 6–4
French Open; Paris, France; Grand Slam; Clay, outdoor 24 May – 7 June 2015	35	4R	(Czech Republic) Lucie Šafářová	#13	Loss	6–7 ^{(3–7)}, 4–6
Wimbledon Championships; London, United Kingdom; Grand Slam; Grass, outdoor 29 June – 12 July 2015	36	1R	(United Kingdom) Johanna Konta	#126	Win	6–2, 6–2
Wimbledon Championships; London, United Kingdom; Grand Slam; Grass, outdoor 29 June – 12 July 2015	37	2R	(Netherlands) Richèl Hogenkamp	#123	Win	6–3, 6–1
Wimbledon Championships; London, United Kingdom; Grand Slam; Grass, outdoor 29 June – 12 July 2015	38	3R	(Romania) Irina-Camelia Begu	#31	Win	6–4, 6–3
Wimbledon Championships; London, United Kingdom; Grand Slam; Grass, outdoor 29 June – 12 July 2015	39	4R	(Kazakhstan) Zarina Diyas	#34	Win	6–4, 6–4
Wimbledon Championships; London, United Kingdom; Grand Slam; Grass, outdoor 29 June – 12 July 2015	40	QF	(United States) CoCo Vandeweghe	#47	Win	6–3, 6–7 ^{(3–7)}, 6–2
Wimbledon Championships; London, United Kingdom; Grand Slam; Grass, outdoor 29 June – 12 July 2015	41	SF	(United States) Serena Williams	#1	Loss	2–6, 4–6
2015 Wuhan Open; Wuhan, China; WTA Premier Five; Hard; 23 September – 3 October 2015	–	1R	Bye			
2015 Wuhan Open; Wuhan, China; WTA Premier Five; Hard; 23 September – 3 October 2015	42	2R	(Czech Republic) Barbora Strýcová	#41	Loss	7–6^{(7–1)}, 6–7^{(4–7)}, 2–1 ret.
2015 WTA Finals; Singapore; Year-end championships Hard; 25 October – 1 November 2015
2015 WTA Finals; Singapore; Year-end championships Hard; 25 October – 1 November 2015	43	RR	(Poland) Agnieszka Radwańska	#6	Win	4–6, 6–3, 6–4
2015 WTA Finals; Singapore; Year-end championships Hard; 25 October – 1 November 2015	44	RR	(Romania) Simona Halep	#2	Win	6–4, 6–4
2015 WTA Finals; Singapore; Year-end championships Hard; 25 October – 1 November 2015	45	RR	(Italy) Flavia Pennetta	#8	Win	7–5, 6–1
2015 WTA Finals; Singapore; Year-end championships Hard; 25 October – 1 November 2015	46	SF	(Czech Republic) Petra Kvitová	#4	Loss	3–6, 6–7^{(3–7)}
Fed Cup Final: Czech Republic vs. Russia; Prague, Czech Republic; Fed Cup; Hard, indoor 14–15 November 2015	47	–	(Czech Republic) Karolína Plíšková	#11	Win	6–3, 6–4
Fed Cup Final: Czech Republic vs. Russia; Prague, Czech Republic; Fed Cup; Hard, indoor 14–15 November 2015	48	–	(Czech Republic) Petra Kvitová	#6	Win	3–6, 6–4, 6–2

== Tournament schedule ==
=== Singles schedule ===
Sharapova's 2015 singles tournament schedule is as follows:

Date	Championship	Location	Category	Surface	Points	Outcome
4 January – 10 January	Brisbane International	Brisbane	WTA Premier	Hard	470	Champion defeated (Serbia) A Ivanovic, 6–7^{(4–7)}, 6–3, 6–3
19 January – 1 February	Australian Open	Melbourne	Grand Slam	Hard	1300	Runner-up lost to (United States) S Williams, 3–6, 6–7 ^{(5–7)}
7 February – 8 February	Fed Cup WG: Russia vs. Poland	Kraków	Fed Cup	Hard (i)	N/A	Russia def. Poland, 4–0; Russia advanced to Semifinals vs. Germany
24 February – 1 March	Mexican Open	Acapulco	WTA International	Hard	110	Semifinals gave walkover to (France) C Garcia
4 March – 23 March	Indian Wells Masters	Indian Wells	WTA Premier Mandatory	Hard	120	Fourth Round lost to (Italy) F Pennetta, 6–3, 3–6, 2–6
24 March – 5 April	Miami Open	Miami	WTA Premier Mandatory	Hard	10	Second Round lost to (Russia) D Gavrilova, 6–7^{(4–7)}, 3–6
20 April – 26 April	Stuttgart Open	Stuttgart	WTA Premier	Clay (i)	1	Second Round lost to (Germany) A Kerber, 6–2, 5–7, 1–6
4 May – 10 May	Madrid Open	Madrid	WTA Premier Mandatory	Clay	390	Semifinals lost to (Russia) S Kuznetsova, 2–6, 4–6
11 May – 17 May	Italian Open	Rome	WTA Premier 5	Clay	900	Champion defeated (Spain) C Suárez Navarro, 4–6, 7–5, 6–1
25 May – 6 June	French Open	Paris	Grand Slam	Clay	240	Fourth Round lost to (Czech Republic) L Šafářová 6–7^{(3–7)}, 4–6
29 June – 12 July	Wimbledon	London	Grand Slam	Grass	780	Semifinals lost to (United States) S Williams, 2–6, 4–6
10 August – 16 August	Canadian Open	(Canada) Toronto	WTA Premier 5	Hard	0	Withdrew before tournament began due to right leg strain
17 August – 23 August	Cincinnati Masters	(United States) Cincinnati	WTA Premier 5	Hard	0	Withdrew before tournament began due to right upper leg injury
31 August – 12 September	US Open	(United States) New York City	Grand Slam	Hard	0	Withdrew before tournament began due to right leg injury
27 September – 3 October	Wuhan Open	(China) Wuhan	WTA Premier 5	Hard	1	Second Round retired to (Czech Republic) B Strýcová 7–6^{(7–1)}, 6–7^{(4–7)}, 2–1
5 October – 11 October	China Open	Beijing	WTA Premier Mandatory	Hard	0	Withdrew before tournament began due to left forearm injury
25 October – 1 November	WTA Finals	Singapore	Year-End Championships	Hard (i)	690	Semifinals lost to (Czech Republic) P Kvitová, 3–6, 6–7^{(3–7)}
Total year-end points					5011	

== Yearly records ==
=== Head-to-head matchups ===
Ordered by number of wins

- (Belarus) Victoria Azarenka 2–0
- (Kazakhstan) Zarina Diyas 2–0
- (Colombia) Mariana Duque Mariño 2–0
- (Poland) Agnieszka Radwańska 2–0
- (Spain) Carla Suárez Navarro 2–0
- (Switzerland) Timea Bacsinszky 1–0
- (Romania) Irina-Camelia Begu 1–0
- (Canada) Eugenie Bouchard 1–0
- (Russia) Vitalia Diatchenko 1–0
- (Australia) Jarmila Gajdošová 1–0
- (France) Caroline Garcia 1–0
- (Romania) Simona Halep 1–0
- (Netherlands) Richèl Hogenkamp 1–0
- (Serbia) Ana Ivanovic 1–0
- (Serbia) Bojana Jovanovski 1–0
- (Estonia) Kaia Kanepi 1–0
- (United Kingdom) Johanna Konta 1–0
- (Russia) Ekaterina Makarova 1–0
- (Croatia) Petra Martić 1–0
- (Russia) Alexandra Panova 1–0
- (China) Peng Shuai 1–0
- (Czech Republic) Karolína Plíšková 1–0
- (Poland) Urszula Radwańska 1–0
- (United States) Shelby Rogers 1–0
- (Slovakia) Magdaléna Rybáriková 1–0
- (Kazakhstan) Yaroslava Shvedova 1–0
- (Australia) Samantha Stosur 1–0
- (Ukraine) Elina Svitolina 1–0
- (United States) CoCo Vandeweghe 1–0
- (Belgium) Yanina Wickmayer 1–0
- (Denmark) Caroline Wozniacki 1–0
- (Russia) Daria Gavrilova 1–1
- (Czech Republic) Petra Kvitová 1–1
- (Italy) Flavia Pennetta 1–1
- (Germany) Angelique Kerber 0–1
- (Russia) Svetlana Kuznetsova 0–1
- (Czech Republic) Lucie Šafářová 0–1
- (Czech Republic) Barbora Strýcová 0–1
- (United States) Serena Williams 0–2

=== Finals ===
==== Singles: 3 (2–1) ====
Legend Grand Slams (0–1) WTA Tour Championships (0–0) WTA Premier Mandatory (0–0) WTA Premier 5 (1–0) WTA Premier (1–0) WTA International (0–0)	Finals by surface Clay (1–0) Hard (1–1)	Finals by venue Outdoors (2–1) Indoors (0–0)

Outcome	No.	Date	Championship	Surface	Opponent in the final	Score in the final
Winner	34.	January 10, 2015	Brisbane International, Brisbane, Australia	Hard	(Serbia) Ana Ivanovic	6–7 ^{(4–7)}, 6–3, 6–3
Runner-up	23.	January 31, 2015	Australian Open, Melbourne, Australia (3)	Hard	(United States) Serena Williams	3–6, 6–7 ^{(5–7)}
Winner	35.	May 17, 2015	Italian Open, Rome, Italy	Clay	(Spain) Carla Suárez Navarro	4–6, 7–5, 6–1

=== Earnings ===
#	Event	Prize money	Year-to-date
1	Brisbane International	$195,026	$195,026
2	Australian Open	$1,355,374	$1,550,400
3	Mexican Open	$8,600	$1,559,000
4	Indian Wells Masters	$59,185	$1,618,185
5	Miami Open	$17,100	$1,635,285
6	Stuttgart Open	$10,240	$1,645,525
7	Madrid Open	$221,842	$1,867,367
8	Italian Open	$500,120	$2,367,487
9	French Open	$160,461	$2,527,948
			$2,527,948

Figures in United States dollars (USD) unless noted.

== See also ==
- 2015 WTA Tour
- 2015 Serena Williams tennis season
- Maria Sharapova career statistics
