= 2015 Serena Williams tennis season =

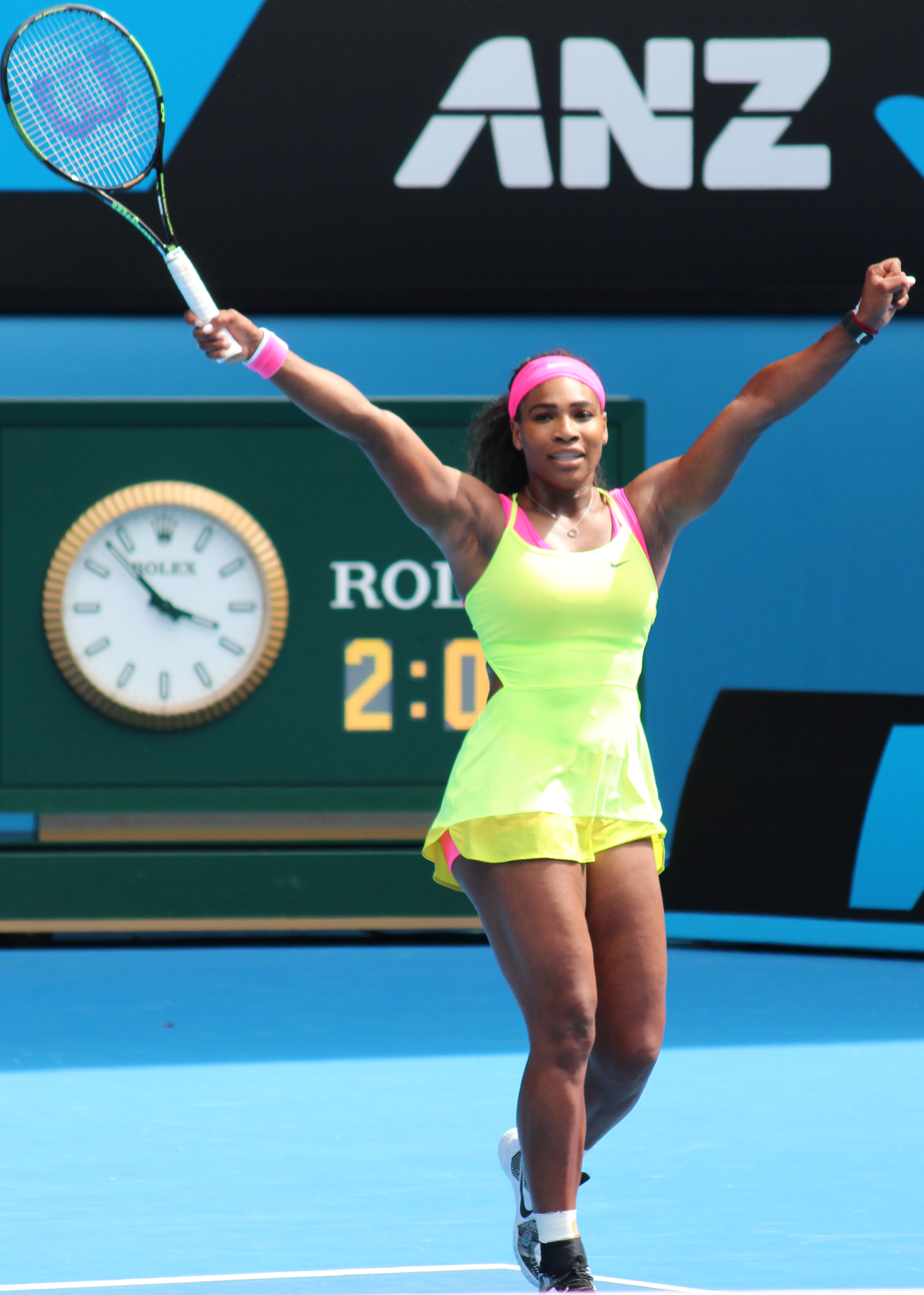
- Serena Williams at the Australian Open
- Full name: Serena Jameka Williams
- Country: United States
- Calendar prize money: $10,582,642

Singles
- Season record: 53–3
- Year-end ranking: No. 1
- Ranking change from previous year: No change

Grand Slam & significant results
- Australian Open: W
- French Open: W
- Wimbledon: W
- US Open: SF

Doubles
- Season record: 0–1
- Last updated on: 4 April 2015.

The 2015 Serena Williams tennis season officially began on 19 January with the start of the 2015 Australian Open and ended with the 2015 US Open. Williams entered the season as the number one ranked player and the defending champion at seven tournaments, including the US Open and the WTA Finals.

During the season, Serena logged her 700th career victory by defeating Sabine Lisicki during the Miami Open, becoming the 8th woman to accomplish the feat. On October 5, Williams surpassed Chris Evert for third-most weeks ranked world no. 1. Williams finished the year at no. 1, and held the ranking for the entire year. She became the first person since Steffi Graf in 1990 to hold the top ranking for two consecutive years. It is also fifth time that Williams ended as the number 1 player in the year. She was also voted WTA Player of the Year for the seventh time in her career, and on December 14, 2015, it was announced that Sports Illustrated named Serena their 2015 Sportsperson of the Year, the third solo woman to earn this honor. On December 22, 2015, Serena announced as the 2015 ITF World Champion for the fourth consecutive year and the sixth time in her career.

== Year in detail ==
=== Australian Open Series ===
==== Hopman Cup ====
Williams began preparation for the first grand slam of the year at the Hopman Cup, where she partnered compatriot John Isner to represent team USA. The pair played their first tie against Italy. Williams got off to a slow start in her singles match against Flavia Pennetta, unable to win a game in the first set. However, a mid-match coffee helped the American turn things around and win the match in three sets. She then teamed up with Isner to win the mixed doubles in a super tiebreak. In the second tie of the exhibition, Williams faced off against Canadian youngster Eugenie Bouchard. The American suffered her first loss in her Hopman Cup history, having previously gone undefeated in her last two campaigns, managing to win only three games. Later Williams teamed up with Isner to win their mixed doubles match in straight sets. In the final round-robin tie of the tournament, Williams came up against Czech lefty Lucie Šafářová in an encounter that lasted over two and a half hours, with the American narrowly clinching victory in a third set tiebreak, 8 points to 6. Team USA also won their mixed doubles match, putting Serena in the Hopman Cup final for the third time in as many attempts. In the final Williams met Poland's Agnieszka Radwańska, to whom she had never lost before. The world No. 5 was in inspired form and took the match in three sets. Williams' teammate Isner managed to salvage and send the tie in to a live mixed doubles rubber after winning his singles match against Janowicz; however, the Poles proved too strong for the Americans and took the Hopman Cup with a two set victory.

==== Australian Open ====
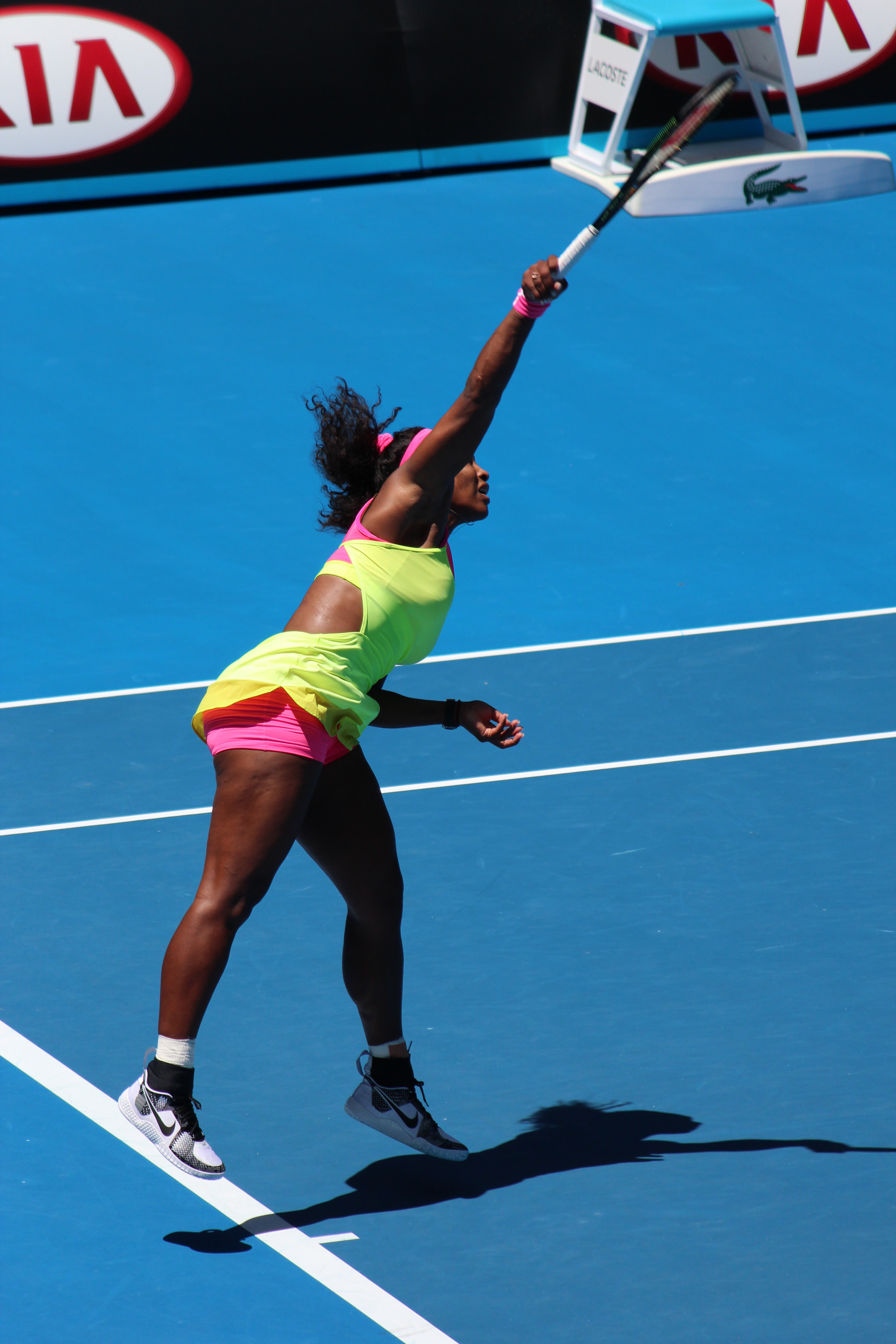
Williams serving during a match at the Australian Open

At the first major of 2015 Williams opened her campaign for a 6th Australian Open title against Alison Van Uytvanck of Belgium. The world No. 1 was dominant in taking the first set without dropping a game in 21 minutes. A tighter second set followed giving the American her 15th first round win at the tournament in as many tries. In the second round Williams came up against former world No. 2 Vera Zvonareva, a rematch of the 2010 Wimbledon final. Williams fell behind and then responded by rattling off ten consecutive games to win in two sets and advance to the final 32. Serena was also scheduled to play doubles with her sister Venus, drawing Anabel Medina Garrigues and Yaroslava Shvedova in the first round; however, the pair pulled out without giving an official reason before the doubles tournament began and were replaced by an alternate team. In the third round Williams came up against Ukrainian counter-puncher Elina Svitolina and after overcoming a slow start, which saw her drop the first set, she fought back to take the match in three sets, hitting 45 winners to her opponent's 27. The trend of sluggish starts continued in the fourth round where Williams came up against her conqueror from the previous year's French Open, Garbiñe Muguruza. As in their previous meeting the young Spaniard took the opening set from a flat-footed Williams. The pair exchanged breaks early in the second set but the world No. 1 raised her level to earn the decisive break in the eighth game and take set two. After a difficult opening service game in the third set, in which Williams saved six break points, the American blasted a total of 15 winners to take the third set and the match.

"Growing up I wasn't the richest, but I had a rich family in spirit and support, and standing here with 19 championships is something I never thought would happen. I went on the courts with just a ball, a racquet and a hope. That's all I had. So all you guys who want to do something or be something, just never give up. You never know what can happen or who you can inspire. I'm just so honored."

— Williams during her winner's speech after defeating Maria Sharapova to win her 6th Australian Open.

At the quarterfinal stage Williams earned her most comfortable victory of the tournament against the previous year's surprise finalist Dominika Cibulková. The top seed hit 15 aces and dropped just four games en route to setting up a final four meeting with her sister's conqueror Madison Keys. Williams had never failed to win the title in Melbourne once making it to the semifinal stage; however, she was broken in the first game and struggled to get into her Fed Cup teammate's service games. Williams eventually broke back in sixth game and won the set in a tiebreak. The world No. 1 coasted in set two and closed out the match on her ninth match point. With passage in to her 23rd Grand Slam final Williams secured she would maintain the number 1 ranking. In the final she came up against her long-time rival and world No. 2 Maria Sharapova to whom she had not lost to in 15 consecutive meetings. Williams began the match aggressively and broke Sharapova's serve immediately. The match continued with serve until the pair traded breaks in the seventh and eighth games, then the world No. 1 broke to love to take the first set from the 2008 champion. The second set was more tightly contested with both women creating break point opportunities but ultimately going with serve to a tiebreaker. Sharapova saved two championship points on her own serve, but Williams' won on her third championship point for her 19th major title. Williams ended the match with 38 winners, including 18 aces and only 25 unforced errors to Sharapova's 21 winners, including 5 aces and 15 unforced errors. With this win Williams broke her tie with Chris Evert and Martina Navratilova for second most Grand Slam singles titles in the Open Era and put herself only three major wins behind Steffi Graf's 22.

==== Fed Cup World Group II ====
Fresh off her victory in Melbourne, Williams flew to Buenos Aires to represent the USA in their tie against Argentina in the Fed Cup World Group II. Serena was nominated to play her first rubber against Argentine No. 2 María Irigoyen. Williams initially struggled to adapt to the clay as the pair went with serve for most of the first set. Williams then won the final eight games of the match to win in straight sets. Williams was nominated to play her second singles rubber against Argentine No.1 Paula Ormaechea; however, she was replaced by CoCo Vandeweghe due to illness. USA won the tie 4–1 and advanced to the Fed Cup World Group play-offs.

=== Indian Wells and Miami ===
==== Indian Wells Masters ====
Shortly after winning the first Grand Slam of the season, Williams, in an exclusive column for TIME magazine, announced her intention to end her 13-year boycott of Indian Wells and return to the tournament for the first since winning the title in 2001. Her highly anticipated opening match was set for 13 March when Monica Niculescu advanced to the second round. Williams' return to Stadium 1 at the Indian Wells Tennis Garden was welcomed with rapturous applause and a standing ovation from those in attendance, including tournament owner Larry Ellison, co-founder of Microsoft Bill Gates and tennis legend John McEnroe. Despite the warm reception Williams was tense and was broken immediately by Niculescu, who went on to serve for the opening set in the tenth game, but Williams' resilience saw her win three consecutive games to take the set. In the second set, the pair traded breaks early on and, just as in the first set, the American got the decisive break in the twelfth game to win the match. In the third round Williams made quick work of an error-strewn Zarina Diyas, losing only two games, concluding with a second set bagel. In the round of 16, Williams faced compatriot Sloane Stephens. A sharp and engaged Stephens got an early lead, taking the first three games, but Williams responded by winning the next three to level the match. The set remained on serve with Stephens saving a set point in the tenth game to force it to a tiebreak, which the younger American won. Williams fought back breaking Stephens' serve a collective four times over the final two sets to advance to the final eight. At the quarterfinal stage Williams took on an in-form Timea Bacsinszky whom advanced to the final eight off the back of winning back-to-back titles in Mexico. The Swiss led the opening set in its early stages; however, as in her opening match, Serena came from behind and claimed the first set, with the decisive break coming in the twelfth game. The second set started with four consecutive breaks of serve. Williams righted the ship with a break of serve in the eighth game, which she backed up by serving out the match to 15 to secure a spot in the semifinals. Williams finished the match with 23 winners to her opponents' 11, including 7 aces. Williams was set to face world No. 3 Simona Halep at the semifinal stage but had to withdraw before the match due to a right knee injury. After her withdrawal was announced to those in attendance Williams came out on to Stadium 1 court to address the crowd, apologize for her withdrawal and reassure fans that she would be back in 2016.

==== Miami Open ====
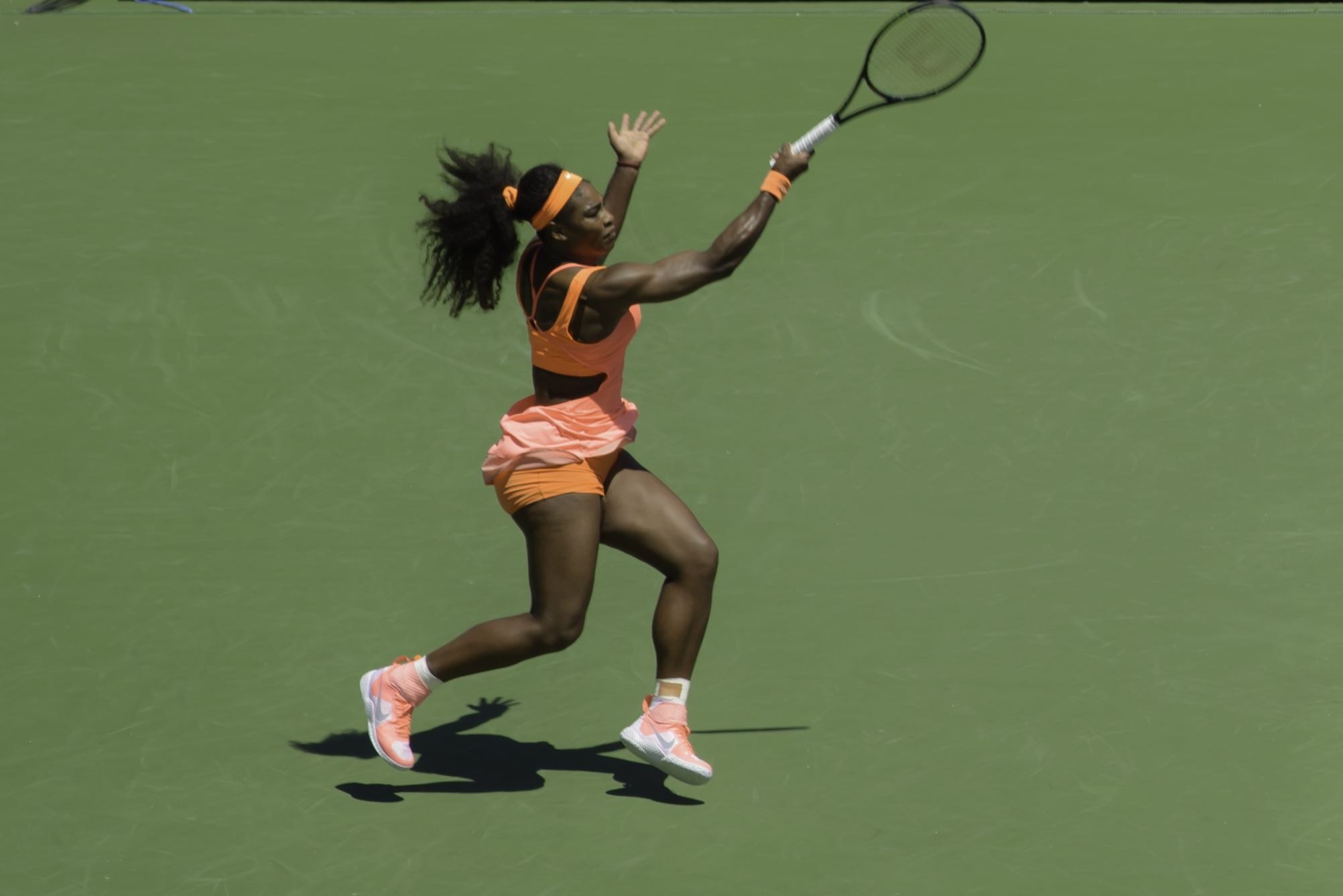
Williams competing in the Miami Open final

Williams returned to Miami the following week with aims to defend her title and to further extend her record and become the only player to have won the event eight times. After receiving a bye in to the second round as the top seed, Williams was pitted against Monica Niculescu in her opening match for the second straight tournament. The world No. 1 made light work of the Romanian this time, dropping just four games and showing no signs of the knee injury that forced her to withdraw from Indian Wells. In the third round Williams needed only 41 minutes to overwhelm the incumbent ITF junior world No. 1 Catherine Bellis, dropping just 14 points in her victory over the teenager. Serena then took on old rival and 2006 Miami champion Svetlana Kuznetsova in the fourth round. Williams went untroubled on serve, saving all four break points against her and broke the Russian's serve three times en route to a comfortable victory, the most lopsided win for Serena since 2004. In the quarterfinals the world No. 1 faced off against her conqueror at 2013 Wimbledon Championships, Sabine Lisicki. The in-form German tested the world No. 1 with her big return game but despite leading Williams by a break twice in the first set she was broken back immediately on both occasions. Williams eventually took the first set in a tiebreak and broke Lisicki's serve to begin the second set; however, Williams began to struggle with the sun while serving and went on to commit 17 unforced errors to drop the set. Frustrated with her play, Williams refocused and cleaned up her errors to gain a decisive break in the second game and take the set and match in the third. This victory marked Williams' 700th career win, the most among active players and ninth on the all-time list. In the semifinals she faced third seed and the last player to beat her, Simona Halep, in a match that was originally set to take place two weeks earlier. Williams came out firing, blasting 13 winners to Halep's 6 to take the opening set. The second set went with serve until errors started to flow from Williams' racket which the Romanian was the beneficiary of in the ninth game. Halep served out the set. The world No.1 ended the set with 20 unforced errors to Simona's 10. Williams struck back immediately breaking Halep at the first opportunity in the third set. Williams won a tight third set. In the final Williams faced her sister's conqueror Carla Suárez Navarro. The Spaniard had lost all eight sets contested in four previous meetings with Williams and this was no different with Williams winning in 56 minutes. Williams struck 27 winners, including 7 aces, to 16 unforced errors to successfully defend her title and win Miami for a record eighth time. This was also the second time Williams had won three consecutive Miami titles after originally winning the event three consecutive times between 2002 and 2004.

=== European clay court swing ===
==== Fed Cup World Group play-offs ====
In a quest to gain eligibility for the 2016 Summer Olympics Williams began her clay season in Brindisi in a Fed Cup World Group play-off tie against Italy. The American was nominated to play Camila Giorgi in her first rubber and edged out the first set in a tiebreak. Williams broke serve for the first time in the fourth game and wrapped up the match with a second break as the Italian was serving to stay in the match. The tie was locked at 1–1 at the end of day 1 after Williams' teammate Lauren Davis managed to win only three games in her rubber. Williams played Italian No. 1 Sara Errani in her second single rubber and lost just her second set in eight meetings against the Italian. The American's fluctuating level saw her go from a break up to a break down with the Italian serving for the match. The American broke serve and won the set in a tiebreak to level the match. Williams took the third set and ended the match with 70 winners to Errani's 7. With this win team USA led 2–1 and needed one more point to advance back into the World Group. The tie was forced in to a deciding doubles rubber when Christina McHale managed just two games in her loss to Brindisi-born Flavia Pennetta. Williams teamed up with Alison Riske, marking the first time she had played doubles with anyone other than her sister Venus in 13 years, to take on Eranni and Pennetta. The Italian pairing handed Williams her first Fed Cup loss en route to winning the final rubber and clinching the tie 3–2. USA were relegated to World Group II.

==== Madrid Open ====
After winning a couple of shaky matches on clay in Brindisi, Williams arrived in Madrid to play her first WTA event of the clay season. Her first round opponent was one of the breakout stars of 2015, Madison Brengle. It took Williams just 55 minutes to beat her fellow American, with the loss of just one game, hitting 36 winners to just 18 unforced errors. Williams faced Sloane Stephens, for the second time this season, in the second round. A break of serve in the opening game was enough for Williams to secure the opening set. Stephens failed to win a game in the second set and the No. 1 seed advanced in to the third round in 58 minutes. Williams' third round opponent was familiar foe Victoria Azarenka whom she had not faced in over a year. Despite being down 5–1 in the first set tiebreak, Williams won six consecutive points to claim the set. Azarenka fought back and won the second set. The deciding set went back and forth until William won the tiebreak to advance to the quarterfinals. At the quarterfinal stage Williams dominated clay court specialist Carla Suárez Navarro, hitting 43 winners to 27 unforced errors, for the loss of just four games. This win set up a semifinal encounter with world No. 4 and reigning Wimbledon champion, Petra Kvitová. Williams lost the match in straight sets and was handed her first loss of the year.

==== Italian Open ====
With her win streak snapped, Williams returned to Rome as the two-time defending champion. She opened her defense against world No. 39 Anastasia Pavlyuchenkova and won comprehensively in just over an hour, striking 25 winners to only 17 unforced errors. Williams was set to face countrywoman Christina McHale in the third round but withdrew before the match citing a right elbow injury. This was the first time Williams headed in to the French Open without winning a warm-up clay tournament since 2010.

==== French Open ====
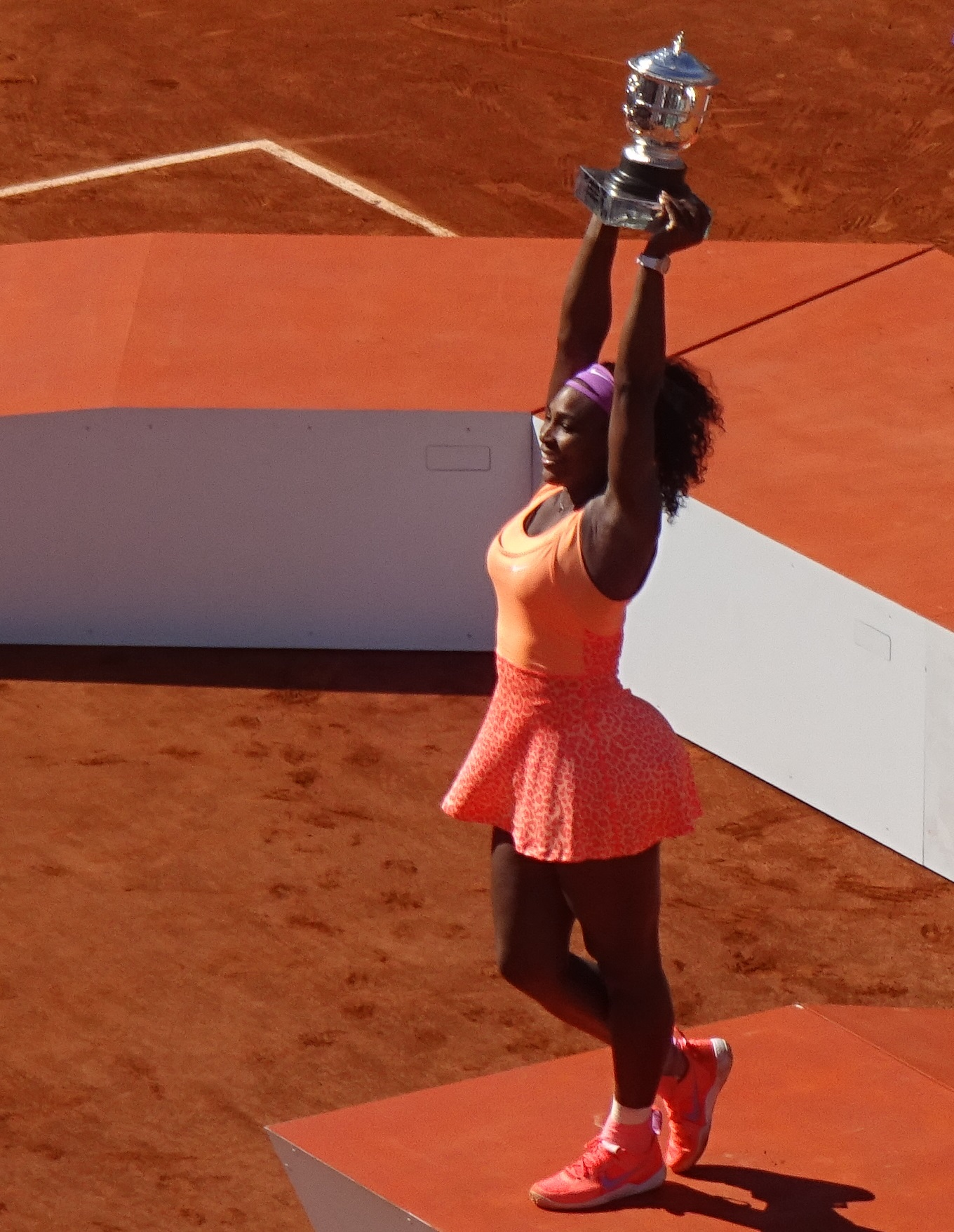
Williams celebrating a third French Open title

To kick off her French Open campaign, Williams faced off against Czech qualifier and accomplished doubles player Andrea Hlaváčková. The world No. 1 advanced with ease in just under an hour, blasting 25 winners, untroubled by the elbow injury that had forced her to withdraw from Rome. In the second round Williams was pitted against another qualifier, Germany's Anna-Lena Friedsam. The qualifier failed to serve the first set out, but Williams' sloppy play saw her drop the opener. Williams fought back to force a decider, in which she broke in the first and final of Friedsam's service games to advance to the final 32. Her next opponent was close rival and friend Victoria Azarenka. Williams came into this match having never lost to the Belarusian at a major in eight previous meetings. Azarenka started sharp on return, breaking Williams' serve thrice to lead the world No. 1 by a set and a break. Williams battled to break back in the eighth game to level the set. In the tenth game the Belarusian saved a set point but the chair umpire called for the point to be replayed. Williams took her chance and sealed set. Azarenka, furious with the call, let out her frustration by breaking Serena in her opening service game of the deciding set. Williams responded by winning six straight games to take the match in just over two hours, finishing the match with 41 winners to 21 unforced errors. With this win Williams became the first woman in the Open Era to win 50 matches at each Grand Slam. In the fourth round, Williams faced compatriot Sloane Stephens. Stephens took advantage of a slow starting Williams taking the first set losing just a game and breaking the world No. 1's serve thrice. In the second set, Williams came back to break in the seventh game just to be broken back by Stephens. However, Williams broke again in the eleventh and closed it out to push it to a decider. In the final set, Williams broke the younger Americans serve twice, including in the ninth and final game.

In the last eight, Williams took on Italy's Sara Errani, Williams dominated the match losing only four games in the match including a breadstick in the first set. Williams hit 39 winners including 10 aces. In the final four, Williams faced first time slam semifinalist Swiss Timea Bacsinszky. In the first, Bacsinszky broke Williams in the fifth game and that was enough for the Swiss to serve it out in the tenth game to take the first set. In the second set, Bacsinszky broke Williams again in the fifth game, but Williams came back and won the next ten games of the match to advance to the finals. In the final, Williams faced first time finalist Lucie Šafářová, Williams broke Šafářová in the fourth game and closed it out in the ninth game. Williams took an early lead, leading with two breaks; however, as Williams tightened up, Šafářová took advantage and brought it back on serve. Williams then broke in the eleventh game and served for the match but Šafářová broke back to push it to a tie-break. Šafářová dominated tie-break. In the final set, Šafářová took the first two games but Williams came back to win the next six game to win the match. The win gave Williams her 20th slam, being the third person to win 20 or more slams and the third person to win each slam at least three times.

=== Wimbledon Championships ===
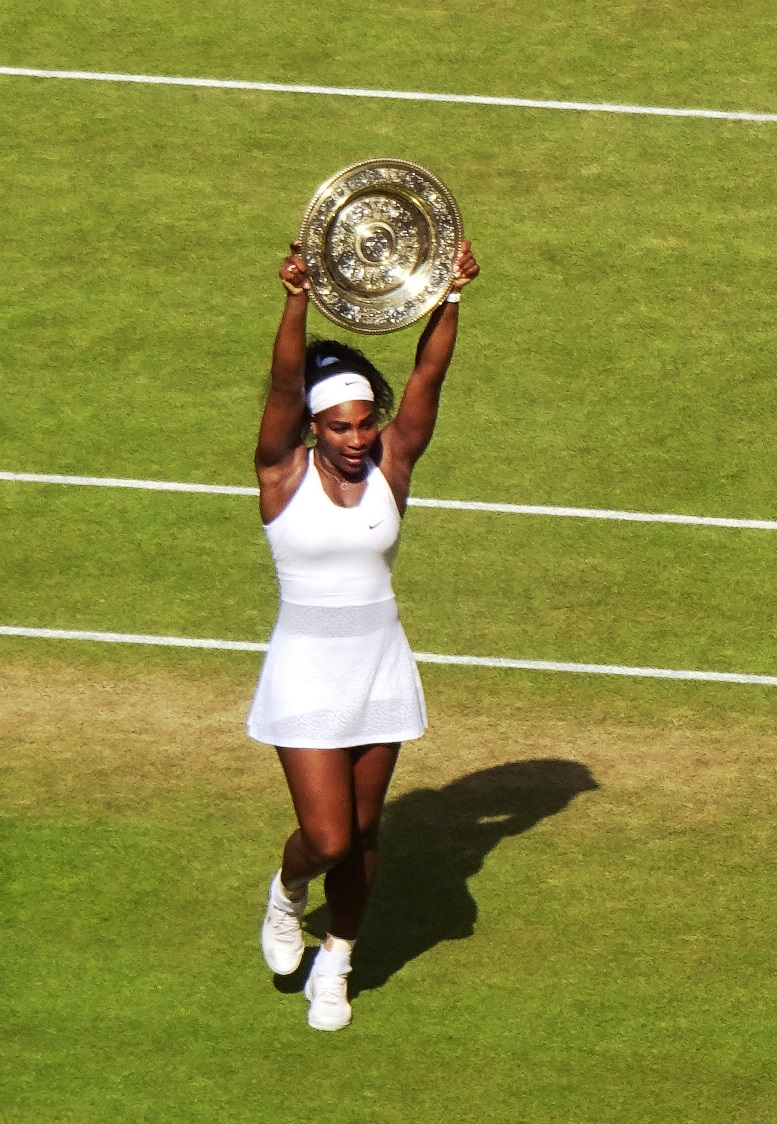
Williams lifting the Venus Rosewater Dish for a sixth time

Despite the addition of an extra week of grass court events before Wimbledon, the five-time singles champion, did not play a grass court tune-up event coming into this Grand Slam event. In her opening round Williams faced off against Russian qualifier Margarita Gasparyan, whom she struggled with initially, falling a break behind early in the first set, but Williams bounced back to dispatch her opponent in two sets. Her second round match was against talented doubles player Tímea Babos, a match that would last only 59 minutes, with Williams losing only five games. In the third round, against Heather Watson and a partisan crowd, Williams was two points from losing with Watson serving for the match. After 135 minutes, Williams prevailed in three sets. She would face her sister Venus Williams in her fourth round encounter — the earliest the sisters had met at the Championships and the earliest the two had met in a Grand Slam since the 2005 US Open — but it was a routine two set victory for the younger Williams sister.

In the quarterfinals, Williams faced Victoria Azarenka. For the second consecutive major Azarenka won the first set with her accurate return game, but Williams raised her level in the second set and after a multi-deuce fourth game, in which Azarenka held serve, Williams ran away with the match, winning seven consecutive games with her pinpoint serving. The world No. 1 went on to seal the match in three sets, serving 17 aces, her best serving performance of the Championships. In the semifinals Williams faced off against world No. 4 Maria Sharapova. Williams defeated Sharapova for the seventeenth consecutive time for the loss of six games to advance to her eighth Wimbledon final. In the final she faced major final debutant Garbiñe Muguruza, the young Spaniard who had handed Williams her heaviest defeat at a major, just a year before. Though Williams' opening service game was broken, she recovered and won the opening set. Williams raced ahead to a double break lead and would serve for the match twice, but the young Spaniard broke the world No. 1 both times. Although Muguruza got the match back on serve, she would still have to serve to stay in the match. Williams broke the Spaniard's serve to win her sixth Wimbledon title and complete the "Serena Slam 2.0". The final lasted 83 minutes, with Williams serving 12 aces to 8 double faults, hitting 29 winners to 15 unforced errors, and getting in 37 of 68 first serves. With this victory Serena Williams became the oldest female in the Open Era to win a major singles title, passing the former mark of Martina Navratilova. This win was her twenty-first major singles title, putting her one behind Steffi Graf's Open Era record, and three behind the all-time mark set by Margaret Court.

==== Swedish Open ====
Immediately following her triumph at Wimbledon, Williams returned to Båstad after missing the previous edition of the tournament because of a viral illness. The world No. 1 faced Ysaline Bonaventure and needed just 53 minutes to collect a win over the Belgian for the loss of three games. Williams was set to play Klára Koukalová in the round of 16, but withdrew due to an elbow injury.

=== US Open Series ===
==== Canadian Open ====
Williams began her US Open Series in Toronto after withdrawing from Stanford with the same elbow injury sustained earlier in the year. After receiving a bye in the first round as the top seed, Williams faced Italian veteran Flavia Pennetta and won in three sets coming from a set and a break down to win. She then beat Andrea Petkovic and Roberta Vinci in straight sets to advance to the semifinals. She lost to 18-year old Swiss Belinda Bencic in three tight sets. During the match she served at 50 percent, committed 59 unforced errors (more than half the points Bencic won) and converted on only 6 of her 20 break point opportunities. It was her second defeat of the year and first on hard court since the 2014 WTA Finals to Simona Halep. The loss also ended William's 18 match winning streak in three-set matches. Coincidentally, the last time she suffered a three-set loss was also in the semifinals of the Canadian Open (against her sister Venus) in 2014.

==== Cincinnati Open ====
Williams was the top seed and, after a bye, she defeated Tsvetana Pironkova and Karin Knapp both in straight sets. In the quarterfinals she defeated Ana Ivanovic in three sets and Elina Svitolina in the semifinals in straight sets. She won her fifth title of the year with a two set victory over Simona Halep.

==== US Open ====
Williams was the top seed and three-time defending champion and hoping to win a calendar year Grand Slam. She started off with Russian Vitalia Diatchenko in the first round where quickly won on the first set, however, Diatchenko retired due to an injury to advance the next round. In the second round, she faced with Dutch Kiki Bertens that lasted in 1 hour and 32 minutes. In the third round, she faced fellow American Bethanie Mattek-Sands where she had a tough momentum that lost on the first set. During the second set, she narrowly avoided upset by Mattek-Sands and quickly regained focus on the third set. In the round of 16, she faced with another fellow American Madison Keys and winning in straight sets. In the quarterfinal stage, she faced her third American opponent in a row, her sister Venus, Serena dominated early in the first set. During the second set, she lost to Venus, and in the third set, she narrowly defeated her sister to advance to the semifinals. In the semifinals, she faced Italy's Roberta Vinci who was on her first Grand Slam singles semifinal. The semifinal match was supposed to play the night before but was delayed due to rain. The odds favored Serena; Vinci had never beaten Serena Williams in all of their four previous meetings, and Serena performed well in the first set. However, she was upset by Vinci and lost the next two sets, ending her bid to win the calendar-year Grand Slam, won last by Steffi Graf in 1988. It was also her first Slam loss since the previous year's Wimbledon.

=== China Open and WTA Finals ===
On October 2, Williams announced that she is withdrawn in both China Open and the WTA Finals due to injuries. Williams is a defending quarterfinalist in the China Open, while she is a three-time defending champion in the WTA Finals that she is considering to be a fan favorite.

== All matches ==
=== Singles matches ===
Tournament	Match	Round	Opponent	Rank	Result	Score
Australian Open; Melbourne, Australia; Grand Slam; Hard, outdoor 19 January – 1 February 2015	805	1R	(Belgium) Alison Van Uytvanck	#106	Win	6–0, 6–4
Australian Open; Melbourne, Australia; Grand Slam; Hard, outdoor 19 January – 1 February 2015	806	2R	(Russia) Vera Zvonareva	#203	Win	7–5, 6–0
Australian Open; Melbourne, Australia; Grand Slam; Hard, outdoor 19 January – 1 February 2015	807	3R	(Ukraine) Elina Svitolina	#26	Win	4–6, 6–2, 6–0
Australian Open; Melbourne, Australia; Grand Slam; Hard, outdoor 19 January – 1 February 2015	808	4R	(Spain) Garbiñe Muguruza	#24	Win	2–6, 6–3, 6–2
Australian Open; Melbourne, Australia; Grand Slam; Hard, outdoor 19 January – 1 February 2015	809	QF	(Slovakia) Dominika Cibulková	#10	Win	6–2, 6–2
Australian Open; Melbourne, Australia; Grand Slam; Hard, outdoor 19 January – 1 February 2015	810	SF	(United States) Madison Keys	#35	Win	7–6^{(7–5)}, 6–2
Australian Open; Melbourne, Australia; Grand Slam; Hard, outdoor 19 January – 1 February 2015	811	F	(Russia) Maria Sharapova	#2	Win (1)	6–3, 7–6^{(7–5)}
Fed Cup WG II: USA vs. Argentina; Buenos Aires, Argentina; Fed Cup; Clay, outdoor 7–8 February 2015	812	–	(Argentina) María Irigoyen	#197	Win	7–5, 6–0
Indian Wells Masters; Indian Wells, United States; WTA Premier Mandatory; Hard, outdoor 9–22 March 2015	–	1R	Bye			
Indian Wells Masters; Indian Wells, United States; WTA Premier Mandatory; Hard, outdoor 9–22 March 2015	813	2R	(Romania) Monica Niculescu	#68	Win	7–5, 7–5
Indian Wells Masters; Indian Wells, United States; WTA Premier Mandatory; Hard, outdoor 9–22 March 2015	814	3R	(Kazakhstan) Zarina Diyas	#32	Win	6–2, 6–0
Indian Wells Masters; Indian Wells, United States; WTA Premier Mandatory; Hard, outdoor 9–22 March 2015	815	4R	(United States) Sloane Stephens	#42	Win	6–7^{(3–7)}, 6–2, 6–2
Indian Wells Masters; Indian Wells, United States; WTA Premier Mandatory; Hard, outdoor 9–22 March 2015	816	QF	(Switzerland) Timea Bacsinszky	#26	Win	7–5, 6–3
Indian Wells Masters; Indian Wells, United States; WTA Premier Mandatory; Hard, outdoor 9–22 March 2015	–	SF	(Romania) Simona Halep	#3	Withdrew	Walkover
Miami Open; Miami, United States; WTA Premier Mandatory; Hard, outdoor 24 March – 4 April 2015	–	1R	Bye			
Miami Open; Miami, United States; WTA Premier Mandatory; Hard, outdoor 24 March – 4 April 2015	817	2R	(Romania) Monica Niculescu	#70	Win	6–3, 6–1
Miami Open; Miami, United States; WTA Premier Mandatory; Hard, outdoor 24 March – 4 April 2015	818	3R	(United States) Catherine Bellis	#211	Win	6–1, 6–1
Miami Open; Miami, United States; WTA Premier Mandatory; Hard, outdoor 24 March – 4 April 2015	819	4R	(Russia) Svetlana Kuznetsova	#29	Win	6–2, 6–3
Miami Open; Miami, United States; WTA Premier Mandatory; Hard, outdoor 24 March – 4 April 2015	820	QF	(Germany) Sabine Lisicki	#21	Win	7–6^{(7–4)}, 1–6, 6–3
Miami Open; Miami, United States; WTA Premier Mandatory; Hard, outdoor 24 March – 4 April 2015	821	SF	(Romania) Simona Halep	#3	Win	6–2, 4–6, 7–5
Miami Open; Miami, United States; WTA Premier Mandatory; Hard, outdoor 24 March – 4 April 2015	822	F	(Spain) Carla Suárez Navarro	#12	Win (2)	6–2, 6–0
Fed Cup WG play-offs: USA vs. Italy; Brindisi, Italy; Fed Cup; Clay, outdoor 18–19 April 2015	823	–	(Italy) Camila Giorgi	#36	Win	7–6^{(7–5)}, 6–2
Fed Cup WG play-offs: USA vs. Italy; Brindisi, Italy; Fed Cup; Clay, outdoor 18–19 April 2015	824	–	(Italy) Sara Errani	#15	Win	4–6, 7–6^{(7–3)}, 6–3
Madrid Open; Madrid, Spain; WTA Premier Mandatory; Clay, outdoor 1–10 May 2015	825	1R	(United States) Madison Brengle	#36	Win	6–0, 6–1
Madrid Open; Madrid, Spain; WTA Premier Mandatory; Clay, outdoor 1–10 May 2015	826	2R	(United States) Sloane Stephens	#38	Win	6–4, 6–0
Madrid Open; Madrid, Spain; WTA Premier Mandatory; Clay, outdoor 1–10 May 2015	827	3R	(Belarus) Victoria Azarenka	#31	Win	7–6^{(7–5)}, 3–6, 7–6^{(7–1)}
Madrid Open; Madrid, Spain; WTA Premier Mandatory; Clay, outdoor 1–10 May 2015	828	QF	(Spain) Carla Suárez Navarro	#12	Win	6–1, 6–3
Madrid Open; Madrid, Spain; WTA Premier Mandatory; Clay, outdoor 1–10 May 2015	829	SF	(Czech Republic) Petra Kvitová	#4	Loss	2–6, 3–6
Italian Open; Rome, Itay; WTA Premier 5 Clay, outdoor 11–17 May 2015	–	1R	Bye			
Italian Open; Rome, Itay; WTA Premier 5 Clay, outdoor 11–17 May 2015	830	2R	(Russia) Anastasia Pavlyuchenkova	#39	Win	6–1, 6–3
Italian Open; Rome, Itay; WTA Premier 5 Clay, outdoor 11–17 May 2015	–	3R	(United States) Christina McHale	#65	Withdrew	Walkover
French Open; Paris, France; Grand Slam; Clay, outdoor 24 May – 7 June 2015	831	1R	(Czech Republic) Andrea Hlaváčková	#190	Win	6–2, 6–3
French Open; Paris, France; Grand Slam; Clay, outdoor 24 May – 7 June 2015	832	2R	(Germany) Anna-Lena Friedsam	#105	Win	5–7, 6–3, 6–3
French Open; Paris, France; Grand Slam; Clay, outdoor 24 May – 7 June 2015	833	3R	(Belarus) Victoria Azarenka	#27	Win	3–6, 6–4, 6–2
French Open; Paris, France; Grand Slam; Clay, outdoor 24 May – 7 June 2015	834	4R	(United States) Sloane Stephens	#40	Win	1–6, 7–5, 6–3
French Open; Paris, France; Grand Slam; Clay, outdoor 24 May – 7 June 2015	835	QF	(Italy) Sara Errani	#17	Win	6–1, 6–3
French Open; Paris, France; Grand Slam; Clay, outdoor 24 May – 7 June 2015	836	SF	(Switzerland) Timea Bacsinszky	#24	Win	4–6, 6–3, 6–0
French Open; Paris, France; Grand Slam; Clay, outdoor 24 May – 7 June 2015	837	F	(Czech Republic) Lucie Šafářová	#13	Win (3)	6–3, 6–7^{(2–7)}, 6–2
Wimbledon Championships; London, United Kingdom; Grand Slam; Grass, outdoor 29 June – 12 July 2015	838	1R	(Russia) Margarita Gasparyan	#113	Win	6–4, 6–1
Wimbledon Championships; London, United Kingdom; Grand Slam; Grass, outdoor 29 June – 12 July 2015	839	2R	(Hungary) Tímea Babos	#93	Win	6–4, 6–1
Wimbledon Championships; London, United Kingdom; Grand Slam; Grass, outdoor 29 June – 12 July 2015	840	3R	(United Kingdom) Heather Watson	#59	Win	6–2, 4–6, 7–5
Wimbledon Championships; London, United Kingdom; Grand Slam; Grass, outdoor 29 June – 12 July 2015	841	4R	(United States) Venus Williams	#16	Win	6–4, 6–3
Wimbledon Championships; London, United Kingdom; Grand Slam; Grass, outdoor 29 June – 12 July 2015	842	QF	(Belarus) Victoria Azarenka	#24	Win	3–6, 6–2, 6–3
Wimbledon Championships; London, United Kingdom; Grand Slam; Grass, outdoor 29 June – 12 July 2015	843	SF	(Russia) Maria Sharapova	#4	Win	6–2, 6–4
Wimbledon Championships; London, United Kingdom; Grand Slam; Grass, outdoor 29 June – 12 July 2015	844	F	(Spain) Garbiñe Muguruza	#20	Win (4)	6–4, 6–4
Swedish Open; Båstad, Sweden; WTA International; Clay, outdoor 13–19 July 2015	845	1R	(Belgium) Ysaline Bonaventure	#215	Win	6–2, 6–1
Swedish Open; Båstad, Sweden; WTA International; Clay, outdoor 13–19 July 2015	–	2R	(Czech Republic) Klára Koukalová	#105	Withdrew	Walkover
Canadian Open; Toronto, Canada; WTA Premier 5 Hard, outdoor 10–16 August 2015	–	1R	Bye			
Canadian Open; Toronto, Canada; WTA Premier 5 Hard, outdoor 10–16 August 2015	846	2R	(Italy) Flavia Pennetta	#26	Win	2–6, 6–3, 6–0
Canadian Open; Toronto, Canada; WTA Premier 5 Hard, outdoor 10–16 August 2015	847	3R	(Germany) Andrea Petkovic	#16	Win	6–3, 6–2
Canadian Open; Toronto, Canada; WTA Premier 5 Hard, outdoor 10–16 August 2015	848	QF	(Italy) Roberta Vinci	#53	Win	6–4, 6–3
Canadian Open; Toronto, Canada; WTA Premier 5 Hard, outdoor 10–16 August 2015	849	SF	(Switzerland) Belinda Bencic	#20	Loss	6–3, 5–7, 4–6
Cincinnati Masters; Cincinnati, United States; WTA Premier 5 Hard, outdoor 17–23 August 2015	–	1R	Bye			
Cincinnati Masters; Cincinnati, United States; WTA Premier 5 Hard, outdoor 17–23 August 2015	850	2R	(Bulgaria) Tsvetana Pironkova	#42	Win	7–5, 6–3
Cincinnati Masters; Cincinnati, United States; WTA Premier 5 Hard, outdoor 17–23 August 2015	851	3R	(Italy) Karin Knapp	#35	Win	6–0, 6–2
Cincinnati Masters; Cincinnati, United States; WTA Premier 5 Hard, outdoor 17–23 August 2015	852	QF	(Serbia) Ana Ivanovic	#9	Win	3–6, 6–4, 6–2
Cincinnati Masters; Cincinnati, United States; WTA Premier 5 Hard, outdoor 17–23 August 2015	853	SF	(Ukraine) Elina Svitolina	#20	Win	6–4, 6–3
Cincinnati Masters; Cincinnati, United States; WTA Premier 5 Hard, outdoor 17–23 August 2015	854	F	(Romania) Simona Halep	#3	Win (5)	6–3, 7–6^{(7–5)}
US Open; New York City, United States; Grand Slam; Hard, outdoor 31 August – 13 September 2015	855	1R	(Russia) Vitalia Diatchenko	#86	Win	6–0, 2–0 ret.
US Open; New York City, United States; Grand Slam; Hard, outdoor 31 August – 13 September 2015	856	2R	(Netherlands) Kiki Bertens	#110	Win	7–6^{(7–5)}, 6–3
US Open; New York City, United States; Grand Slam; Hard, outdoor 31 August – 13 September 2015	857	3R	(United States) Bethanie Mattek-Sands	#101	Win	3–6, 7–5, 6–0
US Open; New York City, United States; Grand Slam; Hard, outdoor 31 August – 13 September 2015	858	4R	(United States) Madison Keys	#19	Win	6–3, 6–3
US Open; New York City, United States; Grand Slam; Hard, outdoor 31 August – 13 September 2015	859	QF	(United States) Venus Williams	#23	Win	6–2, 1–6, 6–3
US Open; New York City, United States; Grand Slam; Hard, outdoor 31 August – 13 September 2015	860	SF	(Italy) Roberta Vinci	#43	Loss	6–2, 4–6, 4–6

=== Doubles matches ===
Tournament	Match	Round	Partner	Opponents	Rank	Result	Score
Australian Open; Melbourne, Australia; Grand Slam; Hard, outdoor 19 January – 1 February 2015	–	1R	(United States) Venus Williams	(Spain) Anabel Medina Garrigues (Kazakhstan) Yaroslava Shvedova	#22 #25	Withdrew	–
Fed Cup WG play-offs: USA vs. Italy; Brindisi, Italy; Fed Cup; Clay, outdoor 18–19 April 2015	205	–	(United States) Alison Riske	(Italy) Sara Errani (Italy) Flavia Pennetta	#2 #15	Loss	0–6, 3–6
Wimbledon Championships; London, United Kingdom; Grand Slam; Grass, outdoor 29 June – 12 July 2015	–	1R	(United States) Venus Williams	(United Kingdom) Johanna Konta (United States) Maria Sanchez	#195 #96	Withdrew	–

== Tournament schedule ==
=== Singles schedule ===
Williams' 2015 singles tournament schedule is as follows:

Date	Championship	Location	Category	Surface	Points	Outcome
19 January – 1 February	Australian Open	Melbourne	Grand Slam	Hard	2000	Winner defeated (Russia) M Sharapova, 6–3, 7–6^{(7–5)}
7 February – 8 February	Fed Cup WG II: USA vs. Argentina	Buenos Aires	Fed Cup	Clay	–	United States def. Argentina, 4–1; USA advanced to WG play-offs vs. Italy
16 February – 22 February	Dubai Tennis Championships	Dubai	WTA Premier 5	Hard	0	Withdrew before tournament began due to illness
9 March – 22 March	Indian Wells Masters	Indian Wells	WTA Premier Mandatory	Hard	390	Semifinals withdrew before match against (Romania) S Halep
23 March – 5 April	Miami Masters	Miami	WTA Premier Mandatory	Hard	1000	Winner defeated (Spain) C Suárez Navarro, 6–2, 6–0
18 April – 19 April	Fed Cup WG play-offs: USA vs. Italy	Brindisi	Fed Cup	Clay	–	Italy def. United States, 3–2; USA relegated to World Group II
4 May – 10 May	Madrid Open	Madrid	WTA Premier Mandatory	Clay	390	Semifinals lost to (Czech Republic) P Kvitová, 2–6, 3–6
11 May – 17 May	Italian Open	Rome	WTA Premier 5	Clay	105	Third round withdrew before match against (United States) C McHale
25 May – 6 June	French Open	Paris	Grand Slam	Clay	2000	Winner defeated (Czech Republic) L Šafářová, 6–3, 6–7^{(2–7)}, 6–2
29 June – 12 July	Wimbledon	London	Grand Slam	Grass	2000	Winner defeated (Spain) G Muguruza, 6–4, 6–4
13 July – 19 July	Swedish Open	Båstad	WTA International	Clay	30	Second round withdrew before match against (Czech Republic) K Koukalová
3 August – 9 August	Stanford Classic	Stanford	WTA Premier	Hard	0	Withdrew before tournament began due to elbow injury
10 August – 16 August	Canadian Open	Toronto	WTA Premier 5	Hard	350	Semifinals lost to (Switzerland) B Bencic, 6–3, 5–7, 4–6
17 August – 23 August	Cincinnati Masters	Cincinnati	WTA Premier 5	Hard	900	Winner defeated (Romania) S Halep, 6–3, 7–6^{(7–5)}
31 August – 12 September	US Open	New York City	Grand Slam	Hard	780	Semifinals lost to (Italy) R Vinci, 6–2, 4–6, 4–6
5 October – 11 October	China Open	Beijing	WTA Premier Mandatory	Hard	0	Withdrew due to elbow and knee injuries
25 October – 1 November	WTA Finals	Singapore	Year-End Championships	Hard (i)	0	Withdrew due to elbow and knee injuries
Total year-end points					9945	

=== Doubles schedule ===
Williams' 2015 doubles tournament schedule is as follows:

Date	Championship	Location	Category	Surface	Points	Outcome
19 January – 1 February	Australian Open	Melbourne	Grand Slam	Hard	0	Withdrew before match against (Spain) A Medina Garrigues/ (Kazakhstan) Y Shvedova
18 April – 19 April	Fed Cup WG play-offs: USA vs. Italy	Brindisi	Fed Cup	Clay	–	Italy def. United States, 3–2; USA relegated to World Group II
29 June – 12 July	Wimbledon	London	Grand Slam	Grass	0	Withdrew before match against (United Kingdom) J Konta/ (United States) M Sanchez
Total year-end points					0	

=== Team events ===
==== Hopman Cup ====
Tournament	Round	Partner	Match	Opponents	Result	Score
Hopman Cup; Perth, Western Australia, Australia; Mixed round-robin Hard, outdoor 4–11 January 2015
Hopman Cup; Perth, Western Australia, Australia; Mixed round-robin Hard, outdoor 4–11 January 2015	RR	(United States) John Isner	Singles	(Italy) Flavia Pennetta	Win	0–6, 6–3, 6–0
Hopman Cup; Perth, Western Australia, Australia; Mixed round-robin Hard, outdoor 4–11 January 2015	RR	(United States) John Isner	Doubles	(Italy) Flavia Pennetta (Italy) Fabio Fognini	Win	6–2, 2–6, [11–9]
Hopman Cup; Perth, Western Australia, Australia; Mixed round-robin Hard, outdoor 4–11 January 2015	RR	(United States) John Isner	Singles	(Canada) Eugenie Bouchard	Loss	2–6, 1–6
Hopman Cup; Perth, Western Australia, Australia; Mixed round-robin Hard, outdoor 4–11 January 2015	RR	(United States) John Isner	Doubles	(Canada) Eugenie Bouchard (Canada) Vasek Pospisil	Win	6–3, 7–5
Hopman Cup; Perth, Western Australia, Australia; Mixed round-robin Hard, outdoor 4–11 January 2015	RR	(United States) John Isner	Singles	(Czech Republic) Lucie Šafářová	Win	6–3, 6–7^{(1–7)}, 7–6^{(8–6)}
Hopman Cup; Perth, Western Australia, Australia; Mixed round-robin Hard, outdoor 4–11 January 2015	RR	(United States) John Isner	Doubles	(Czech Republic) Lucie Šafářová (Czech Republic) Adam Pavlásek	Win	6–3, 6–3
Hopman Cup; Perth, Western Australia, Australia; Mixed round-robin Hard, outdoor 4–11 January 2015	F	(United States) John Isner	Singles	(Poland) Agnieszka Radwańska	Loss	4–6, 7–6^{(7–3)}, 1–6
Hopman Cup; Perth, Western Australia, Australia; Mixed round-robin Hard, outdoor 4–11 January 2015	F	(United States) John Isner	Doubles	(Poland) Agnieszka Radwańska (Poland) Jerzy Janowicz	Loss	5–7, 3–6

== Yearly records ==
=== Head-to-head matchups ===
Ordered by percentage of wins

- (Belarus) Victoria Azarenka 3–0
- (United States) Sloane Stephens 3–0
- (Switzerland) Timea Bacsinszky 2–0
- (Italy) Sara Errani 2–0
- (Romania) Simona Halep 2–0
- (United States) Madison Keys 2–0
- (Spain) Garbiñe Muguruza 2–0
- (Romania) Monica Niculescu 2–0
- (Russia) Maria Sharapova 2–0
- (Spain) Carla Suárez Navarro 2–0
- (Ukraine) Elina Svitolina 2–0
- (United States) Venus Williams 2–0
- (Hungary) Tímea Babos 1–0
- (United States) Catherine Bellis 1–0
- (Netherlands) Kiki Bertens 1–0
- (Belgium) Ysaline Bonaventure 1–0
- (United States) Madison Brengle 1–0
- (Slovakia) Dominika Cibulková 1–0
- (Russia) Vitalia Diatchenko 1–0
- (Kazakhstan) Zarina Diyas 1–0
- (Germany) Anna-Lena Friedsam 1–0
- (Russia) Margarita Gasparyan 1–0
- (Italy) Camila Giorgi 1–0
- (Czech Republic) Andrea Hlaváčková 1–0
- (Argentina) María Irigoyen 1–0
- (Serbia) Ana Ivanovic 1–0
- (Italy) Karin Knapp 1–0
- (Russia) Svetlana Kuznetsova 1–0
- (Germany) Sabine Lisicki 1–0
- (United States) Bethanie Mattek-Sands 1–0
- (Russia) Anastasia Pavlyuchenkova 1–0
- (Italy) Flavia Pennetta 1–0
- (Germany) Andrea Petkovic 1–0
- (Bulgaria) Tsvetana Pironkova 1–0
- (Czech Republic) Lucie Šafářová 1–0
- (Belgium) Alison Van Uytvanck 1–0
- (United Kingdom) Heather Watson 1–0
- (Russia) Vera Zvonareva 1–0
- (Italy) Roberta Vinci 1–1
- (Switzerland) Belinda Bencic 0–1
- (Czech Republic) Petra Kvitová 0–1

=== Finals ===
==== Singles: 5 (5–0) ====
Legend Grand Slams (3–0) WTA Tour Championships (0–0) WTA Premier Mandatory (1–0) WTA Premier 5 (1–0) WTA Premier (0–0) WTA International (0–0)	Finals by surface Hard (3–0) Clay (1–0) Grass (1–0)	Finals by venue Outdoors (5–0) Indoors (0–0)

Outcome	No.	Date	Championship	Surface	Opponent in the final	Score in the final
Winner	65.	January 31, 2015	Australian Open, Melbourne, Australia (6)	Hard	(Russia) Maria Sharapova	6–3, 7–6^{(7–5)}
Winner	66.	April 4, 2015	Miami Open, Miami, United States (8)	Hard	(Spain) Carla Suárez Navarro	6–2, 6–0
Winner	67.	June 6, 2015	French Open, Paris, France (3)	Clay	(Czech Republic) Lucie Šafářová	6–3, 6–7^{(2–7)}, 6–2
Winner	68.	July 11, 2015	Wimbledon Championships, London, England (6)	Grass	(Spain) Garbiñe Muguruza	6–4, 6–4
Winner	69.	August 23, 2015	Cincinnati Masters, Cincinnati, United States (2)	Hard	(Romania) Simona Halep	6–3, 7–6^{(7–5)}

=== Earnings ===
#	Event	Prize money	Year-to-date
1	Australian Open	$2,710,749	$2,710,749
2	Indian Wells Masters	$166,250	$2,876,999
3	Miami Masters	$900,400	$3,777,399
4	Madrid Open	$221,210	$3,998,609
5	Italian Open	$28,281	$4,026,890
6	French Open	$2,148,759	$6,175,649
7	Wimbledon Championships	$2,999,266	$9,174,915
8	Swedish Open	$3,400	$9,178,315
9	Canadian Open	$119,330	$9,297,645
10	Cincinnati Masters	$495,000	$9,792,645
11	US Open	$789,997	$10,582,642
			$10,582,642

Figures in United States dollars (USD) unless noted.

== See also ==
- 2015 WTA Tour
- Serena Williams career statistics

Sporting positions
Preceded by Venus Williams; Angelique Kerber	World No. 1 First stint: July 8, 2002 – August 10, 2003; Last stint: April 24, 2017 – May 14, 2017	Succeeded by Kim Clijsters; Angelique Kerber
Preceded by Jennifer Capriati; Justine Henin; Petra Kvitová	Year-end World No. 1; 2002; 2008, 2009; 2012 – 2015	Succeeded by Justine Henin; Kim Clijsters; Angelique Kerber
Awards
Preceded by Jennifer Capriati; Jelena Janković; Petra Kvitová	ITF Women's Singles World Champion; 2002; 2009; 2012 – 2015	Succeeded by Justine Henin; Caroline Wozniacki; Angelique Kerber
Preceded by Martina Hingis & Anna Kournikova; Cara Black & Liezel Huber	WTA Doubles Team of the Year; 2000 (with Venus Williams); 2009 (with Venus Williams)	Succeeded by Lisa Raymond & Rennae Stubbs; Gisela Dulko & Flavia Pennetta
Preceded by Cara Black & Liezel Huber	ITF Women's Doubles World Champion; 2009 (with Venus Williams)	Succeeded by Gisela Dulko & Flavia Pennetta
