= 2015 Fed Cup World Group play-offs =

Part of tennis tournament

The World Group play-offs were four ties which involved the losing nations of the World Group first round and the winning nations of the World Group II. Nations that won their play-off ties entered the 2016 World Group, while losing nations joined the 2016 World Group II.

Participating Teams
Australia	Canada	Italy	Netherlands
Poland	Romania	Switzerland	United States

== Italy vs. USA ==
Italy
3
Circolo Tennis Brindisi, Brindisi, Italy
18–19 April 2015
Clay

United States
2

			1	2	3
1	(Italy) (United States)	Camila Giorgi; Serena Williams	6^{5} 7^{7}	2; 6
2	(Italy) (United States)	Sara Errani; Lauren Davis	6; 1	6; 2
3	(Italy) (United States)	Sara Errani; Serena Williams	6; 4	6^{3} 7^{7}	3; 6
4	(Italy) (United States)	Flavia Pennetta; Christina McHale	6; 1	6; 1
5	(Italy) (United States)	Sara Errani / Flavia Pennetta; Alison Riske / Serena Williams	6; 0	6; 3

== Netherlands vs. Australia ==
Netherlands
4
Maaspoort Sports & Events, 's-Hertogenbosch, Netherlands
18–19 April 2015
Clay (indoor)

Australia
1

			1	2	3
1	(Netherlands) (Australia)	Kiki Bertens; Jarmila Gajdošová	6; 1	6; 3
2	(Netherlands) (Australia)	Arantxa Rus; Casey Dellacqua	5; 7	3; 6
3	(Netherlands) (Australia)	Kiki Bertens; Casey Dellacqua	6; 2	6; 3
4	(Netherlands) (Australia)	Arantxa Rus; Jarmila Gajdošová	0; 6	7; 5	7; 5
5	(Netherlands) (Australia)	Richèl Hogenkamp / Michaëlla Krajicek; Casey Dellacqua / Olivia Rogowska	6; 2	7^{7} 6^{3}

== Poland vs. Switzerland ==
Poland
2
CRS Hall Zielona Góra, Zielona Góra, Poland
18–19 April 2015
Hard (indoor)

Switzerland
3

			1	2	3
1	(Poland) (Switzerland)	Agnieszka Radwańska; Martina Hingis	6; 4	6; 0
2	(Poland) (Switzerland)	Urszula Radwańska; Timea Bacsinszky	2; 6	1; 6
3	(Poland) (Switzerland)	Agnieszka Radwańska; Timea Bacsinszky	1; 6	1; 6
4	(Poland) (Switzerland)	Urszula Radwańska; Martina Hingis	4; 6	7; 5	6; 1
5	(Poland) (Switzerland)	Agnieszka Radwańska / Alicja Rosolska; Timea Bacsinszky / Viktorija Golubic	6; 2	4; 6	7; 9

== Canada vs. Romania ==
Canada
2
Aréna Maurice Richard, Montreal, Canada
18–19 April 2015
Hard (indoor)

Romania
3

			1	2	3
1	(Canada) (Romania)	Françoise Abanda; Irina-Camelia Begu	4; 6	7; 5	6; 4
2	(Canada) (Romania)	Eugenie Bouchard; Alexandra Dulgheru	4; 6	4; 6
3	(Canada) (Romania)	Eugenie Bouchard; Andreea Mitu	6; 4	4; 6	1; 6
4	(Canada) (Romania)	Françoise Abanda; Alexandra Dulgheru	6; 3	5; 7	2; 6
5	(Canada) (Romania)	Gabriela Dabrowski / Sharon Fichman; Andreea Mitu / Raluca Olaru	6; 1	4; 6	10; 5
