= 2015 Fed Cup World Group II =

Part of tennis tournament

The World Group II was the second-highest level of Fed Cup competition in 2015. The winning nations advanced to the World Group play-offs, and the losing nations relegated to the World Group II play-offs.

== Netherlands vs. Slovakia ==
Netherlands
4
Omnisport Apeldoorn, Apeldoorn, Netherlands
7–8 February 2015
Clay (indoors)

Slovakia
1

			1	2	3
1	(Netherlands) (Slovakia)	Kiki Bertens; Anna Karolína Schmiedlová	2; 6	5; 7
2	(Netherlands) (Slovakia)	Arantxa Rus; Magdaléna Rybáriková	6; 3	6; 4
3	(Netherlands) (Slovakia)	Kiki Bertens; Magdaléna Rybáriková	6; 1	2; 6	6; 1
4	(Netherlands) (Slovakia)	Arantxa Rus; Anna Karolína Schmiedlová	6; 3	2; 6	6; 4
5	(Netherlands) (Slovakia)	Richèl Hogenkamp / Michaëlla Krajicek; Kristína Kučová / Kristína Schmiedlová	7; 5	6; 1

== Romania vs. Spain ==
Romania
3
Danube Arena, Galați, Romania
7–8 February 2015
Hard (indoors)

Spain
2

			1	2	3
1	(Romania) (Spain)	Simona Halep; Sílvia Soler Espinosa	6; 2	6; 1
2	(Romania) (Spain)	Irina-Camelia Begu; Garbiñe Muguruza	3; 6	2; 6
3	(Romania) (Spain)	Simona Halep; Garbiñe Muguruza	4; 6	3; 6
4	(Romania) (Spain)	Irina-Camelia Begu; Sílvia Soler Espinosa	6; 2	6; 4
5	(Romania) (Spain)	Irina-Camelia Begu / Monica Niculescu; Garbiñe Muguruza / Anabel Medina Garrigues	5; 7	6; 3	6; 2

== Sweden vs. Switzerland ==
Sweden
1
Helsingborg Arena, Helsingborg, Sweden
7–8 February 2015
Hard (indoors)

Switzerland
3

			1	2	3
1	(Sweden) (Switzerland)	Rebecca Peterson; Timea Bacsinszky	6^{4} 7^{7}	0; 6
2	(Sweden) (Switzerland)	Johanna Larsson; Belinda Bencic	1; 6	2; 6
3	(Sweden) (Switzerland)	Johanna Larsson; Timea Bacsinszky	3; 6	6^{5} 7^{7}
4	(Sweden) (Switzerland)	Rebecca Peterson; Belinda Bencic				not played
5	(Sweden) (Switzerland)	Johanna Larsson / Rebecca Peterson; Viktorija Golubic / Xenia Knoll	5; 7	6; 2	10; 5

== Argentina vs. USA ==
Argentina
1
Pilara Tennis Club, Buenos Aires, Argentina
7–8 February 2015
Clay (outdoors)

United States
4

			1	2	3
1	(Argentina) (United States)	Paula Ormaechea; Venus Williams	3; 6	2; 6
2	(Argentina) (United States)	María Irigoyen; Serena Williams	5; 7	0; 6
3	(Argentina) (United States)	Paula Ormaechea; Coco Vandeweghe	6; 4	6; 4
4	(Argentina) (United States)	María Irigoyen; Venus Williams	1; 6	4; 6
5	(Argentina) (United States)	Tatiana Búa / Nadia Podoroska; Taylor Townsend / Coco Vandeweghe	2; 6	3; 6
