= 2015 Mutua Madrid Open =

- Date: 2–10 May
- Edition: 14th (ATP); 7th (WTA)
- Draw: 56S / 24D; 64S / 28D
- Prize money: €4,185,405 (ATP) €4,185,405 (WTA)
- Surface: Clay
- Location: Madrid, Spain
- Venue: Park Manzanares

Champions

Men's singles
- (United Kingdom) Andy Murray

Women's singles
- (Czech Republic) Petra Kvitová

Men's doubles
- (India) Rohan Bopanna / (Romania) Florin Mergea

Women's doubles
- (Australia) Casey Dellacqua / (Kazakhstan) Yaroslava Shvedova
← 2014 ·	Madrid Open	· 2016 →

The 2015 Mutua Madrid Open was a professional tennis tournament that was played on outdoor clay courts at the Park Manzanares in Madrid, Spain from 2–10 May. It was the 14th edition of the event on the ATP World Tour and 7th on the WTA Tour. It was classified as an ATP World Tour Masters 1000 event on the 2015 ATP World Tour and a Premier Mandatory event on the 2015 WTA Tour.

Ion Țiriac the former Romanian ATP player and now billionaire businessman is the current owner of the tournament.

== Points and prize money ==
=== Point distribution ===
Event	W	F	SF	QF	Round of 16	Round of 32	Round of 64	Q	Q2	Q1
Men's singles	1000	600	360	180	90	45	10	25	16	0
Men's doubles	1000	600	360	180	90	0	—	—	—	—
Women's singles	1000	650	390	215	120	65	10	30	20	2
Women's doubles	1000	650	390	215	120	10	—	—	—	—

=== Prize money ===
Event	W	F	SF	QF	Round of 16	Round of 32	Round of 64	Q2	Q1
Men's singles	€799,450	€392,000	€197,280	€100,315	€52,090	€27,460	€14,830	€3,420	€1,740
Women's singles	€799,450	€392,000	€197,280	€100,315	€52,090	€27,460	€14,830	€3,420	€1,740
Men's doubles	€247,560	€121,200	€60,800	€31,200	€16,130	€8,510	—	—	—
Women's doubles	€247,560	€121,200	€60,800	€31,200	€16,130	€8,510	—	—	—

== ATP singles main-draw entrants ==
=== Seeds ===
Country	Player	Rank^{1}	Seed
SUI	Roger Federer	2	1
GBR	Andy Murray	3	2
ESP	Rafael Nadal	4	3
JPN	Kei Nishikori	5	4
CAN	Milos Raonic	6	5
CZE	Tomáš Berdych	7	6
ESP	David Ferrer	8	7
SUI	Stan Wawrinka	9	8
CRO	Marin Čilić	10	9
BUL	Grigor Dimitrov	11	10
ESP	Feliciano López	12	11
FRA	Jo-Wilfried Tsonga	14	12
FRA	Gaël Monfils	15	13
ESP	Roberto Bautista Agut	16	14
RSA	Kevin Anderson	17	15
USA	John Isner	18	16

- Rankings are as of 27 April 2015.

=== Other entrants ===
The following players received wildcards into the main draw:

- (Spain) Nicolás Almagro
- (Spain) Pablo Andújar
- (Romania) Marius Copil
- (Spain) Marcel Granollers

The following players received entry from the qualifying draw:

- (Brazil) Thomaz Bellucci
- (Colombia) Alejandro Falla
- (Spain) Daniel Gimeno Traver
- (Colombia) Alejandro González
- (Australia) Thanasi Kokkinakis
- (Spain) Albert Ramos Viñolas
- (Italy) Luca Vanni

The following player received entry as a lucky loser:

- (Portugal) João Sousa

=== Withdrawals ===
Before the tournament

- (France) Julien Benneteau → replaced by (Italy) Simone Bolelli
- (Serbia) Novak Djokovic → replaced by (Czech Republic) Jiří Veselý
- (Spain) Tommy Robredo → replaced by (Portugal) João Sousa
- (Italy) Andreas Seppi → replaced by (Argentina) Juan Mónaco
- (France) Gilles Simon → replaced by (Poland) Jerzy Janowicz

=== Retirements ===
- (Slovakia) Martin Kližan
- (United States) Donald Young

== ATP doubles main-draw entrants ==
=== Seeds ===
Country	Player	Country	Player	Rank^{1}	Seed
USA	Bob Bryan	USA	Mike Bryan	2	1
CRO	Ivan Dodig	BRA	Marcelo Melo	9	2
CAN	Vasek Pospisil	USA	Jack Sock	13	3
NED	Jean-Julien Rojer	ROU	Horia Tecău	22	4
POL	Marcin Matkowski	SRB	Nenad Zimonjić	26	5
ESP	Marcel Granollers	ESP	Marc López	27	6
CAN	Daniel Nestor	IND	Leander Paes	30	7
FRA	Nicolas Mahut	FRA	Édouard Roger-Vasselin	32	4

- Rankings are as of 27 April 2015.

=== Other entrants ===
The following pairs received wildcards into the doubles main draw:

- (India) Mahesh Bhupathi / (Australia) Nick Kyrgios
- (Spain) Feliciano López / (Belarus) Max Mirnyi

The following pair received entry as alternates:

- (United States) Steve Johnson / (United States) Sam Querrey

=== Withdrawals ===
Before the tournament

- (United States) John Isner (back injury)

=== Retirements ===
- (Canada) Vasek Pospisil (ankle injury)

== WTA singles main-draw entrants ==
=== Seeds ===
Country	Player	Rank^{1}	Seed
USA	Serena Williams	1	1
ROU	Simona Halep	2	2
RUS	Maria Sharapova	3	3
CZE	Petra Kvitová	4	4
DEN	Caroline Wozniacki	5	5
CAN	Eugenie Bouchard	6	6
SRB	Ana Ivanovic	7	7
RUS	Ekaterina Makarova	8	8
POL	Agnieszka Radwańska	9	9
ESP	Carla Suárez Navarro	10	10
GER	Andrea Petkovic	11	11
GER	Angelique Kerber	12	12
CZE	Lucie Šafářová	13	13
CZE	Karolína Plíšková	14	14
ITA	Sara Errani	15	15
USA	Venus Williams	16	16

- Rankings are as of 27 April 2015.

=== Other entrants ===
The following players received wildcards into the main draw:

- (Spain) Lara Arruabarrena
- (Romania) Alexandra Dulgheru
- (Italy) Francesca Schiavone
- (Spain) Sílvia Soler Espinosa
- (Spain) María Teresa Torró Flor

The following player received entry using a protected ranking into the main draw:

- (United States) Bethanie Mattek-Sands

The following players received entry from the qualifying draw:

- (Spain) Paula Badosa Gibert
- (Colombia) Mariana Duque Mariño
- (New Zealand) Marina Erakovic
- (Germany) Julia Görges
- (Belarus) Olga Govortsova
- (Croatia) Mirjana Lučić-Baroni
- (United States) Christina McHale
- (Romania) Andreea Mitu

=== Withdrawals ===
Before the tournament

- (Serbia) Jelena Janković → replaced by (United States) Bethanie Mattek-Sands
- (Sweden) Johanna Larsson → replaced by (Croatia) Ajla Tomljanović
- (Slovakia) Magdaléna Rybáriková → replaced by (Japan) Kurumi Nara

During the tournament

- (Germany) Andrea Petkovic (gastrointestinal illness)

=== Retirements ===
- (Spain) Paula Badosa Gibert (left leg injury)
- (Romania) Alexandra Dulgheru (cramping)

== WTA doubles main-draw entrants ==
=== Seeds ===
Country	Player	Country	Player	Rank^{1}	Seed
SUI	Martina Hingis	IND	Sania Mirza	5	1
RUS	Ekaterina Makarova	RUS	Elena Vesnina	14	2
ESP	Garbiñe Muguruza	ESP	Carla Suárez Navarro	22	3
TPE	Hsieh Su-wei	ITA	Flavia Pennetta	25	4
USA	Raquel Kops-Jones	USA	Abigail Spears	28	5
FRA	Caroline Garcia	SLO	Katarina Srebotnik	38	6
USA	Bethanie Mattek-Sands	CZE	Lucie Šafářová	41	7
CZE	Andrea Hlaváčková	CZE	Lucie Hradecká	44	8

- Rankings are as of 27 April 2015.

=== Other entrants ===
The following pairs received wildcards into the doubles main draw:

- (Spain) Paula Badosa Gibert / (Spain) Sara Sorribes Tormo
- (France) Alizé Cornet / (United Kingdom) Heather Watson
- (Russia) Vera Dushevina / (Spain) María José Martínez Sánchez
- (United States) Madison Keys / (United States) Lisa Raymond

The following pair received entry as alternates:

- (Spain) Lara Arruabarrena / (Romania) Irina-Camelia Begu

=== Withdrawals ===
Before the tournament

- (Spain) Paula Badosa Gibert (left leg injury)

== Finals ==
=== Men's singles ===
- (United Kingdom) Andy Murray defeated (Spain) Rafael Nadal, 6–3, 6–2

=== Women's singles ===
- (Czech Republic) Petra Kvitová defeated (Russia) Svetlana Kuznetsova, 6–1, 6–2

=== Men's doubles ===
- (India) Rohan Bopanna / (Romania) Florin Mergea defeated (Poland) Marcin Matkowski / (Serbia) Nenad Zimonjić, 6–2, 6–7^{(5–7)}, [11–9]

=== Women's doubles ===
- (Australia) Casey Dellacqua / (Kazakhstan) Yaroslava Shvedova defeated (Spain) Garbiñe Muguruza / (Spain) Carla Suárez Navarro, 6–3, 6–7^{(4–7)}, [10–5]
