= 2015 Fed Cup World Group =

Part of tennis tournament

- Date: 7 February – 15 November
- Edition: 25th

Champions
- Czech Republic
- Fed Cup

The World Group was the highest level of Fed Cup competition in 2015.

Participating Teams
Australia	Canada	Czech Republic	Germany
France	Italy	Poland	Russia

== Draw ==
Quarterfinals; 7–8 February
Quebec City, Canada
1	Czech Republic	4
Canada	0
Genoa, Italy
France	3
3	Italy	2
Kraków, Poland
4	Russia	4
Poland	0
Stuttgart, Germany
Australia	1
2	Germany	4

Semifinals; 18–19 April
Ostrava, Czech Republic
1	Czech Republic	3
France	1
Sochi, Russia
4	Russia	3
2	Germany	2

Final; 14–15 November
Prague, Czech Republic
1	Czech Republic	3
4	Russia	2

== First round ==
=== Canada vs Czech Republic ===
Canada
0
PEPS, Québec City, Canada
7–8 February 2015
Hard – Latex-ite Game Point MF (indoors)

Czech Republic
4

			1	2	3
1	(Canada) (Czech Republic)	Françoise Abanda; Karolína Plíšková	2; 6	4; 6
2	(Canada) (Czech Republic)	Gabriela Dabrowski; Tereza Smitková	1; 6	2; 6
3	(Canada) (Czech Republic)	Gabriela Dabrowski; Karolína Plíšková	4; 6	2; 6
4	(Canada) (Czech Republic)	Françoise Abanda; Tereza Smitková				not played
5	(Canada) (Czech Republic)	Françoise Abanda / Gabriela Dabrowski; Denisa Allertová / Lucie Hradecká	1; 6	6^{2} 7^{7}

=== Italy vs France ===
Italy
2
105 Stadium, Genoa, Italy
7–8 February 2015
Red clay (indoors)

France
3

			1	2	3
1	(Italy) (France)	Sara Errani; Caroline Garcia	7^{7} 6^{2}	7; 5
2	(Italy) (France)	Camila Giorgi; Alizé Cornet	6; 4	6; 2
3	(Italy) (France)	Sara Errani; Kristina Mladenovic	4; 6	3; 6
4	(Italy) (France)	Camila Giorgi; Caroline Garcia	6; 4	0; 6	2; 6
5	(Italy) (France)	Sara Errani / Roberta Vinci; Caroline Garcia / Kristina Mladenovic	1; 6	2; 6

=== Poland vs. Russia ===
Poland
0
Kraków Arena, Kraków, Poland
7–8 February 2015
Hard – Rebound Ace Synpave (indoors)

Russia
4

			1	2	3
1	(Poland) (Russia)	Agnieszka Radwańska; Svetlana Kuznetsova	4; 6	6; 2	2; 6
2	(Poland) (Russia)	Urszula Radwańska; Maria Sharapova	0; 6	3; 6
3	(Poland) (Russia)	Agnieszka Radwańska; Maria Sharapova	1; 6	5; 7
4	(Poland) (Russia)	Urszula Radwańska; Svetlana Kuznetsova				not played
5	(Poland) (Russia)	Klaudia Jans-Ignacik / Alicja Rosolska; Vitalia Diatchenko / Anastasia Pavlyuchenkova	4; 6	4; 6

=== Germany vs. Australia ===
Germany
4
Porsche-Arena, Stuttgart, Germany
7–8 February 2015
Hard (indoors)

Australia
1

			1	2	3
1	(Germany) (Australia)	Angelique Kerber; Jarmila Gajdošová	6; 4	2; 6	4; 6
2	(Germany) (Australia)	Andrea Petkovic; Samantha Stosur	6; 4	3; 6	12; 10
3	(Germany) (Australia)	Angelique Kerber; Samantha Stosur	6; 2	6; 4
4	(Germany) (Australia)	Andrea Petkovic; Jarmila Gajdošová	6; 3	3; 6	8; 6
5	(Germany) (Australia)	Julia Görges / Sabine Lisicki; Casey Dellacqua / Olivia Rogowska	6^{2} 7^{7}	7^{9} 6^{7}	10; 6

== Semifinals ==
=== Czech Republic vs. France ===
Czech Republic
3
ČEZ Aréna, Ostrava, Czech Republic
18–19 April 2015
Hard (indoors)

France
1

			1	2	3
1	(Czech Republic) (France)	Lucie Šafářová; Caroline Garcia	4; 6	7^{7} 6^{1}	6; 1
2	(Czech Republic) (France)	Petra Kvitová; Kristina Mladenovic	6; 3	6; 4
3	(Czech Republic) (France)	Petra Kvitová; Caroline Garcia	6; 4	6; 4
4	(Czech Republic) (France)	Lucie Šafářová; Kristina Mladenovic				not played
5	(Czech Republic) (France)	Lucie Šafářová / Barbora Strýcová; Pauline Parmentier / Kristina Mladenovic	6; 0	3; 6	8; 10

=== Russia vs. Germany ===
Russia
3
Adler Arena, Sochi, Russia
18–19 April 2015
Clay (indoors)

Germany
2

			1	2	3
1	(Russia) (Germany)	Svetlana Kuznetsova; Julia Görges	6; 4	6; 4
2	(Russia) (Germany)	Anastasia Pavlyuchenkova; Sabine Lisicki	4; 6	7^{7} 6^{4}	6; 3
3	(Russia) (Germany)	Svetlana Kuznetsova; Andrea Petkovic	2; 6	1; 6
4	(Russia) (Germany)	Anastasia Pavlyuchenkova; Angelique Kerber	1; 6	0; 6
5	(Russia) (Germany)	Anastasia Pavlyuchenkova / Elena Vesnina; Sabine Lisicki / Andrea Petkovic	6; 2	6; 3

== Final ==
=== Czech Republic vs. Russia ===
Czech Republic
3
O2 Arena, Prague, Czech Republic
14–15 November 2015
Novacrylic ultracushion hard (indoors)

Russia
2

			1	2	3
1	(Czech Republic) (Russia)	Petra Kvitová; Anastasia Pavlyuchenkova	2; 6	6; 1	6; 1
2	(Czech Republic) (Russia)	Karolína Plíšková; Maria Sharapova	3; 6	4; 6
3	(Czech Republic) (Russia)	Petra Kvitová; Maria Sharapova	6; 3	4; 6	2; 6
4	(Czech Republic) (Russia)	Karolína Plíšková; Anastasia Pavlyuchenkova	6; 3	6; 4
5	(Czech Republic) (Russia)	Karolína Plíšková / Barbora Strýcová; Anastasia Pavlyuchenkova / Elena Vesnina	4; 6	6; 3	6; 2
