= 2015 BNP Paribas Open =

- Date: March 11–22
- Edition: 42nd (ATP) / 27th (WTA)
- Category: Masters 1000 (men); Premier Mandatory (women)
- Draw: 96S / 32D
- Prize money: $7,107,445 (ATP) $6,157,160 (WTA)
- Surface: Hard / outdoor
- Location: Indian Wells, California, United States
- Venue: Indian Wells Tennis Garden

Champions

Men's singles
- (Serbia) Novak Djokovic

Women's singles
- (Romania) Simona Halep

Men's doubles
- (Canada) Vasek Pospisil / (United States) Jack Sock

Women's doubles
- (Switzerland) Martina Hingis / (India) Sania Mirza
← 2014 ·	Indian Wells Open	· 2016 →

The 2015 BNP Paribas Open (also known as the 2015 Indian Wells Masters) was a professional tennis tournament played at Indian Wells, California, in March 2015. It was the 42nd edition of the men's event (27th for the women), known as the BNP Paribas Open, and was classified as an ATP World Tour Masters 1000 event on the 2015 ATP World Tour and a Premier Mandatory event on the 2015 WTA Tour. Both the men's and the women's events took place at the Indian Wells Tennis Garden in Indian Wells, United States, from March 11 through March 22, 2015, on outdoor hard courts.

== Finals ==
=== Men's singles ===
- (Serbia) Novak Djokovic defeated (Switzerland) Roger Federer, 6–3, 6–7^{(5–7)}, 6–2

=== Women's singles ===
- (Romania) Simona Halep defeated (Serbia) Jelena Janković, 2–6, 7–5, 6–4

=== Men's doubles ===
- (Canada) Vasek Pospisil / (United States) Jack Sock defeated (Italy) Simone Bolelli / (Italy) Fabio Fognini, 6–4, 6–7^{(3–7)}, [10–7]

=== Women's doubles ===
- (Switzerland) Martina Hingis / (India) Sania Mirza defeated (Russia) Ekaterina Makarova / (Russia) Elena Vesnina, 6–3, 6–4

== Points and prize money ==
=== Point distribution ===
Event	W	F	SF	QF	Round of 16	Round of 32	Round of 64	Round of 128	Q	Q2	Q1
Men's singles	1000	600	360	180	90	45	25*	10	16	8	0
Men's doubles	1000	600	360	180	90	0	—	—	—	—	—
Women's singles	1000	650	390	215	120	65	35*	10	30	20	2
Women's doubles	1000	650	390	215	120	10	—	—	—	—	—

- Players with byes receive first-round points.

=== Prize money ===
Event	W	F	SF	QF	Round of 16	Round of 32	Round of 64	Round of 128	Q2	Q1
Men's singles	$900,400	$439,420	$220,230	$112,270	$59,185	$31,670	$17,100	$10,485	$3,125	$1,600
Women's singles	$900,400	$439,420	$220,230	$112,270	$59,185	$31,670	$17,100	$10,485	$3,125	$1,600
Men's doubles	$295,000	$143,980	$72,170	$36,770	$19,390	$10,380	—	—	—	—
Women's doubles	$295,000	$143,980	$72,170	$36,770	$19,390	$10,380	—	—	—	—

== ATP singles main-draw entrants ==
=== Seeds ===
The following are the seeded players. Rankings and seedings are according to ATP rankings on March 9, 2015.

Seed	Rank	Player	Points before	Points defending	Points won	Points after	Status
1	1	(Serbia) Novak Djokovic	13,205	1,000	1,000	13,205	Final defeated (Switzerland) Roger Federer [2]
2	2	(Switzerland) Roger Federer	9,205	600	600	9,205	Lost in the Final to (Serbia) Novak Djokovic [1]
3	3	(Spain) Rafael Nadal	5,675	45	180	5,810	Lost in the Quarterfinals to (Canada) Milos Raonic [6]
4	4	(United Kingdom) Andy Murray	5,425	90	360	5,695	Lost in the Semifinals to (Serbia) Novak Djokovic [1]
5	5	(Japan) Kei Nishikori	5,415	45	90	5,460	Lost in the fourth round to (Spain) Feliciano López [12]
6	6	(Canada) Milos Raonic	4,980	180	360	5,160	Lost in the Semifinals to (Switzerland) Roger Federer [2]
7	7	(Switzerland) Stan Wawrinka	4,595	90	10	4,515	Lost in the second round to (Netherlands) Robin Haase
8	8	(Spain) David Ferrer	4,535	0	45	4,580	Lost in the third round to (Australia) Bernard Tomic [32]
9	9	(Czech Republic) Tomáš Berdych	4,340	10	180	4,510	Lost in the quarterfinals to (Switzerland) Roger Federer [2]
10	10	(Croatia) Marin Čilić	3,450	90	10	3,370	Lost in the second round to (Argentina) Juan Mónaco
11	11	(Bulgaria) Grigor Dimitrov	3,055	45	45	3,055	Lost in the third round to (Spain) Tommy Robredo [17]
12	12	(Spain) Feliciano López	2,325	90	180	2,415	Lost in the quarterfinals to (United Kingdom) Andy Murray [4]
13	14	(France) Gilles Simon	2,050	10	90	2,130	Lost in the fourth round to (Spain) Rafael Nadal [3]
14	15	(Latvia) Ernest Gulbis	2,045	180	45	1,910	Lost in the third round to (France) Adrian Mannarino
15	16	(Spain) Roberto Bautista Agut	2,020	90	45	1,975	Lost in the third round to (United States) Jack Sock
16	17	(South Africa) Kevin Anderson	2,005	180	45	1,870	Lost in the third round to (United States) John Isner [18]
17	19	(Spain) Tommy Robredo	1,755	45	90	1,800	Lost in the fourth round to (Canada) Milos Raonic [6]
18	20	(United States) John Isner	1,720	360	90	1,450	Lost in the fourth round to (Serbia) Novak Djokovic [1]
19	22	(Italy) Fabio Fognini	1,540	90	10	1,460	Lost in the second round to (France) Adrian Mannarino
20	23	(Uruguay) Pablo Cuevas	1,512	(15)	45	1,542	Lost in the third round to (Spain) Feliciano López [12]
21	24	(Croatia) Ivo Karlović	1,500	0	10	1,510	Lost in the second round to (United States) Steve Johnson
22	25	(France) Richard Gasquet	1,410	45	10	1,375	Retired in the second round against (Germany) Michael Berrer [Q]
23	26	(Spain) Guillermo García López	1,405	0	10	1,415	Lost in the second round to (Australia) Thanasi Kokkinakis [WC]
~~24~~	~~27~~	(Argentina) ~~Leonardo Mayer~~	1,364	0	0	1,364	Withdrew before start of tournament
25	28	(France) Julien Benneteau	1,335	180	10	1,165	Lost in the second round to (Spain) Albert Ramos Viñolas
26	29	(Germany) Philipp Kohlschreiber	1,325	10	45	1,360	Lost in the third round to (United Kingdom) Andy Murray [4]
27	30	(Czech Republic) Lukáš Rosol	1,230	25	90	1,295	Lost in the fourth round to (Czech Republic) Tomáš Berdych [9]
28	31	(Spain) Fernando Verdasco	1,225	90	45	1,180	Lost in the third round to (Japan) Kei Nishikori [5]
29	32	(Colombia) Santiago Giraldo	1,210	25	10	1,195	Lost in the second round to (Ukraine) Alexandr Dolgopolov
30	33	(Italy) Andreas Seppi	1,185	45	45	1,185	Lost in the third round to (Switzerland) Roger Federer [2]
31	34	(France) Jérémy Chardy	1,150	25	10	1,135	Lost in the second round to (United States) Donald Young
32	35	(Australia) Bernard Tomic	1,150	0	180	1,330	Withdrew in the quarterfinals vs. (Serbia) Novak Djokovic [1]
33	36	(Luxembourg) Gilles Müller	1,146	0	10	1,156	Lost in the second round to (United States) Jack Sock

=== Other entrants ===
The following players received wildcards into the singles main draw:

- (Australia) Thanasi Kokkinakis
- (United States) Austin Krajicek
- (United States) Denis Kudla
- (United States) Ryan Harrison
- (United States) Tim Smyczek

The following player received entry using a protected ranking into the singles main draw:

- (United States) Mardy Fish

The following players received entry from the qualifying draw:

- (Germany) Michael Berrer
- (Australia) Alex Bolt
- (Croatia) Borna Ćorić
- (Canada) Frank Dancevic
- (Netherlands) Thiemo de Bakker
- (Australia) James Duckworth
- (Romania) Victor Hănescu
- (Serbia) Filip Krajinović
- (Austria) Jürgen Melzer
- (United States) Dennis Novikov
- (France) Édouard Roger-Vasselin
- (Germany) Mischa Zverev

The following player received entry as a lucky loser:

- (Spain) Daniel Gimeno Traver

=== Withdrawals ===
Before the tournament

- (Spain) Nicolás Almagro → replaced by (Croatia) Ivan Dodig
- (Argentina) Carlos Berlocq → replaced by (Germany) Dustin Brown
- (Belgium) David Goffin (rib pain) → replaced by (Netherlands) Igor Sijsling
- (Germany) Tommy Haas (right shoulder) → replaced by (Japan) Tatsuma Ito
- (Italy) Paolo Lorenzi → replaced by (Australia) Marinko Matosevic
- (Argentina) Leonardo Mayer → replaced by (Spain) Daniel Gimeno Traver
- (France) Gaël Monfils (left knee injury) → replaced by (Netherlands) Robin Haase
- (Czech Republic) Radek Štěpánek → replaced by (Cyprus) Marcos Baghdatis
- (Serbia) Janko Tipsarević → replaced by (Austria) Andreas Haider-Maurer
- (France) Jo-Wilfried Tsonga → replaced by (Australia) Sam Groth

During the tournament

- (Australia) Bernard Tomic

=== Retirements ===
- (France) Richard Gasquet
- (Kazakhstan) Mikhail Kukushkin
- (Czech Republic) Jiří Veselý

== ATP doubles main-draw entrants ==
=== Seeds ===
Country	Player	Country	Player	Rank^{1}	Seed
USA	Bob Bryan	USA	Mike Bryan	2	1
CRO	Ivan Dodig	BRA	Marcelo Melo	9	2
FRA	Julien Benneteau	FRA	Édouard Roger-Vasselin	15	3
NED	Jean-Julien Rojer	ROU	Horia Tecău	18	4
AUT	Alexander Peya	BRA	Bruno Soares	24	5
ESP	Marcel Granollers	ESP	Marc López	25	6
IND	Rohan Bopanna	CAN	Daniel Nestor	30	7
CAN	Vasek Pospisil	USA	Jack Sock	31	8

- ^{1} Rankings as of March 9, 2015.

==== Other entrants ====
The following pairs received wildcards into the doubles main draw:

- (Switzerland) Roger Federer / (Switzerland) Michael Lammer
- (Australia) Thanasi Kokkinakis / (United Kingdom) Andy Murray

The following pair received entry as alternates:

- (Colombia) Santiago Giraldo / (Czech Republic) Lukáš Rosol

==== Withdrawals ====
Before the tournament

- (Croatia) Marin Čilić

== WTA singles main-draw entrants ==
=== Seeds ===
The following are the seeded players. Rankings and seedings are according to WTA rankings on March 2, 2015. Points before are as of March 9, 2015.

Seed	Rank	Player	Points before	Points defending	Points won	Points after	Status
1	1	(United States) Serena Williams	9,592	0	390	9,982	Withdrew in the semifinals vs. (Romania) Simona Halep [3]
2	2	(Russia) Maria Sharapova	8,215	65	120	8,270	Lost in the fourth round to (Italy) Flavia Pennetta [15]
3	3	(Romania) Simona Halep	6,571	390	1,000	7,181	Final defeated (Serbia) Jelena Janković [18]
4	5	(Denmark) Caroline Wozniacki	4,825	120	65	4,770	Lost in the third round to (Switzerland) Belinda Bencic [31]
5	6	(Serbia) Ana Ivanovic	4,425	65	65	4,425	Lost in the third round to (France) Caroline Garcia [25]
6	7	(Canada) Eugenie Bouchard	4,306	120	120	4,306	Lost in the fourth round to (Ukraine) Lesia Tsurenko [Q]
7	8	(Poland) Agnieszka Radwańska	4,065	650	65	3,480	Lost in the third round to (United Kingdom) Heather Watson
8	9	(Russia) Ekaterina Makarova	3,420	65	65	3,420	Lost in the third round to (Switzerland) Timea Bacsinszky [27]
9	10	(Germany) Andrea Petkovic	3,190	10	10	3,190	Lost in the second round to (Ukraine) Lesia Tsurenko [Q]
10	11	(Czech Republic) Lucie Šafářová	2,995	65	65	2,995	Lost in the third round to (Ukraine) Elina Svitolina [23]
11	12	(Italy) Sara Errani	2,750	65	65	2,750	Lost in the third round to (Germany) Sabine Lisicki [24]
12	13	(Spain) Carla Suárez Navarro	2,660	65	215	2,810	Lost in the quarterfinals to (Romania) Simona Halep [3]
13	14	(Germany) Angelique Kerber	2,650	10	10	2,650	Lost in the second round to (United States) Sloane Stephens
14	15	(Czech Republic) Karolína Plíšková	2,620	65	120	2,675	Lost in the fourth round to (Romania) Simona Halep [3]
15	16	(Italy) Flavia Pennetta	2,560	1,000	215	1,775	Lost in the quarterfinals to (Germany) Sabine Lisicki [24]
16	18	(United States) Madison Keys	2,100	35	65	2,130	Lost in the third round to (Serbia) Jelena Janković [18]
17	20	(Czech Republic) Barbora Záhlavová-Strýcová	2,055	35	10	2,030	Lost in the second round to (Russia) Anastasia Pavlyuchenkova
18	21	(Serbia) Jelena Janković	2,030	215	650	2,465	Lost in the Final to (Romania) Simona Halep [3]
19	22	(Spain) Garbiñe Muguruza	2,015	10	65	2,070	Lost in the third round to (Czech Republic) Karolína Plíšková [14]
20	24	(France) Alizé Cornet	1,925	120	65	1,870	Lost in the third round to (Ukraine) Lesia Tsurenko [Q]
21	25	(Australia) Samantha Stosur	1,835	65	65	1,835	Lost in the third round to (Italy) Flavia Pennetta [15]
22	26	(Russia) Svetlana Kuznetsova	1,760	65	65	1,760	Lost in the third round to (United States) Sloane Stephens
23	27	(Ukraine) Elina Svitolina	1,740	35	120	1,825	Lost in the fourth round to (Switzerland) Timea Bacsinszky [27]
24	28	(Germany) Sabine Lisicki	1,651	10	390	2,031	Lost in the semifinals vs. (Serbia) Jelena Janković [18]
25	29	(France) Caroline Garcia	1,755	35	120	1,840	Lost in the fourth round to (Germany) Sabine Lisicki [24]
26	30	(United States) Varvara Lepchenko	1,540	65	65	1,540	Lost in the third round to (Romania) Simona Halep [3]
27	31	(Switzerland) Timea Bacsinszky	1,799	0	215	2,014	Lost in the quarterfinals to (United States) Serena Williams [1]
28	32	(Kazakhstan) Zarina Diyas	1,495	0	65	1,560	Lost in the third round to (United States) Serena Williams [1]
29	33	(Italy) Camila Giorgi	1,485	120	10	1,375	Lost in the second round to (United Kingdom) Heather Watson
30	36	(United States) CoCo Vandeweghe	1,423	35	65	1,453	Lost in the third round to (Canada) Eugenie Bouchard [6]
31	37	(Switzerland) Belinda Bencic	1,326	10	120	1,436	Lost in the fourth round to (Serbia) Jelena Janković [18]
32	38	(Belarus) Victoria Azarenka	1,303	10	65	1,358	Lost in the third round to (Russia) Maria Sharapova [2]

==== Other entrants ====
The following players received wildcards into the singles main draw:

- (United States) Louisa Chirico
- (United States) Irina Falconi
- (United States) Nicole Gibbs
- (United States) Bethanie Mattek-Sands
- (United States) Grace Min
- (United States) Taylor Townsend
- (United States) Sachia Vickery
- (United States) Serena Williams

The following player received entry using a protected ranking into the singles main draw:

- (Russia) Vera Zvonareva

The following players received entry from the qualifying draw:

- (Spain) Lara Arruabarrena
- (Russia) Daria Gavrilova
- (Slovenia) Polona Hercog
- (Czech Republic) Lucie Hradecká
- (Tunisia) Ons Jabeur
- (Bulgaria) Sesil Karatantcheva
- (Ukraine) Kateryna Kozlova
- (Kazakhstan) Yulia Putintseva
- (Russia) Evgeniya Rodina
- (Ukraine) Lesia Tsurenko
- (Belgium) Alison Van Uytvanck
- (China) Zhu Lin

==== Withdrawals ====
Before the tournament

- (Romania) Irina-Camelia Begu → replaced by (Czech Republic) Kateřina Siniaková
- (Slovakia) Dominika Cibulková (achilles surgery) → replaced by (Croatia) Donna Vekić
- (Australia) Casey Dellacqua → replaced by (Belgium) Yanina Wickmayer
- (Czech Republic) Petra Kvitová (exhaustion) → replaced by (South Africa) Chanelle Scheepers
- (China) Peng Shuai (back injury) → replaced by (China) Zheng Saisai
- (United Kingdom) Laura Robson → replaced by (Serbia) Aleksandra Krunić
- (Kazakhstan) Yaroslava Shvedova → replaced by (Italy) Francesca Schiavone
- (China) Zhang Shuai → replaced by (Russia) Alla Kudryavtseva

During the tournament

- (United States) Serena Williams

==== Retirements ====
- (Ukraine) Lesia Tsurenko

== WTA doubles main-draw entrants ==
=== Seeds ===
Country	Player	Country	Player	Rank^{1}	Seed
SUI	Martina Hingis	IND	Sania Mirza	12	1
RUS	Ekaterina Makarova	RUS	Elena Vesnina	16	2
USA	Raquel Kops-Jones	USA	Abigail Spears	20	3
TPE	Hsieh Su-wei	ITA	Flavia Pennetta	21	4
ESP	Garbiñe Muguruza	ESP	Carla Suárez Navarro	25	5
HUN	Tímea Babos	FRA	Kristina Mladenovic	31	6
FRA	Caroline Garcia	SLO	Katarina Srebotnik	43	7
CZE	Andrea Hlaváčková	CZE	Lucie Hradecká	46	8

- ^{1} Rankings as of March 2, 2015.

==== Other entrants ====
The following pairs received wildcards into the doubles main draw:

- (Slovakia) Daniela Hantuchová / (Italy) Karin Knapp
- (Serbia) Ana Ivanovic / (Germany) Angelique Kerber
- (Russia) Svetlana Kuznetsova / (United States) CoCo Vandeweghe
- (United States) Sloane Stephens / (United States) Taylor Townsend

==== Withdrawals ====
During the tournament

- (United States) Taylor Townsend (left leg injury)
