= 2013 WTA Tour =

Women's tennis circuit

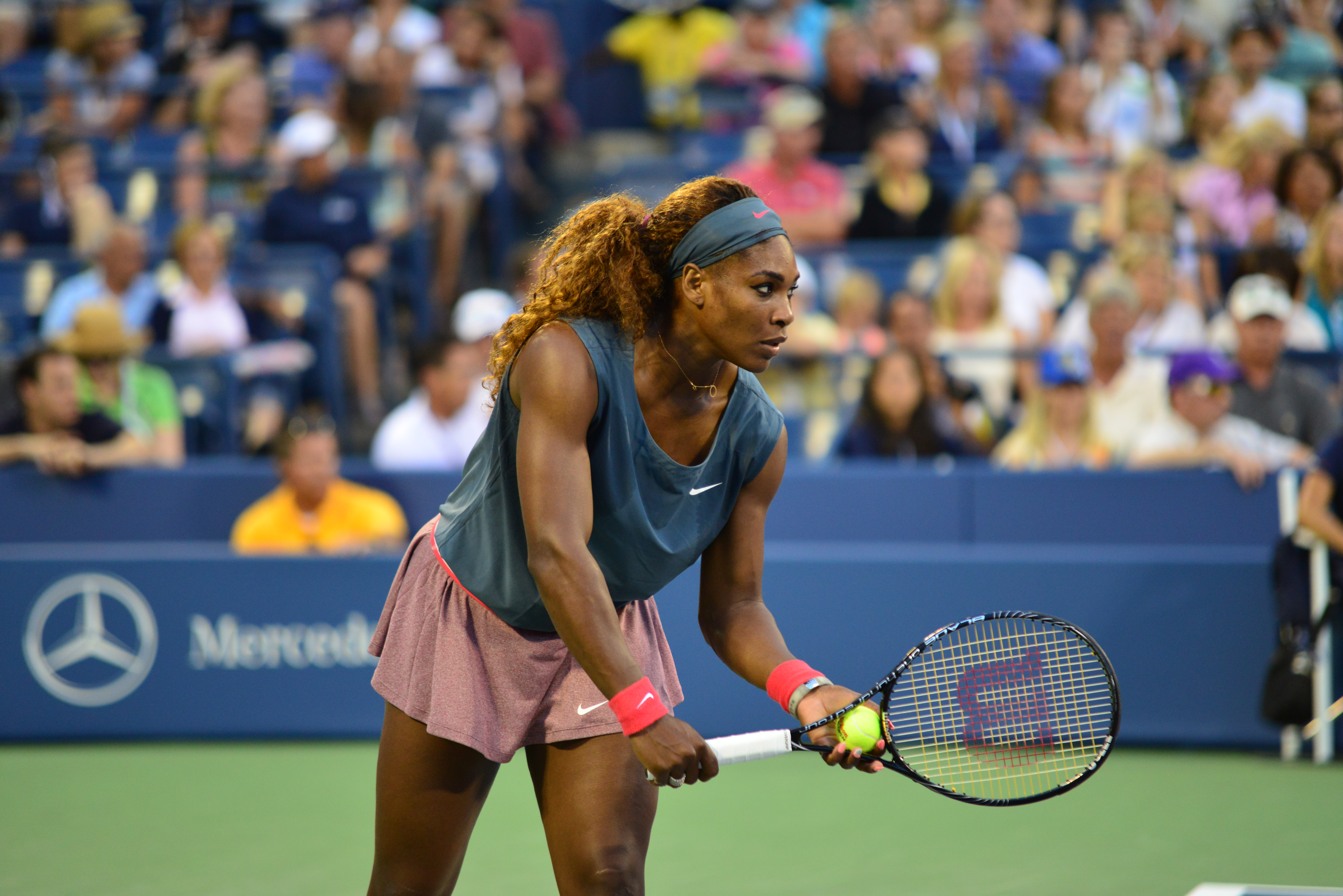
- Serena Williams finished the year as world No. 1 for the third time in her career. She won eleven tournaments during the season, including two majors at the French Open and the US Open, as well as the WTA Tour Championships. She also won five Premier Mandatory and Premier 5 events.

Details
- Duration: December 29, 2012 – November 3, 2013
- Edition: 43rd
- Tournaments: 57
- Categories: Grand Slam (4); WTA Championships (2); WTA Premier Mandatory (4); WTA Premier 5 (5); WTA Premier (12); WTA International tournaments (30)

Achievements (singles)
- Most titles: (United States) Serena Williams (11)
- Most finals: (United States) Serena Williams (13)
- Prize money leader: (United States) Serena Williams (US$12,385,572)
- Points leader: (United States) Serena Williams (13,260)

Awards
- Player of the year: (United States) Serena Williams
- Doubles team of the year: (Italy) Sara Errani (Italy) Roberta Vinci
- Most improved player of the year: (Romania) Simona Halep
- Newcomer of the year: (Canada) Eugenie Bouchard
- Comeback player of the year: (Russia) Alisa Kleybanova

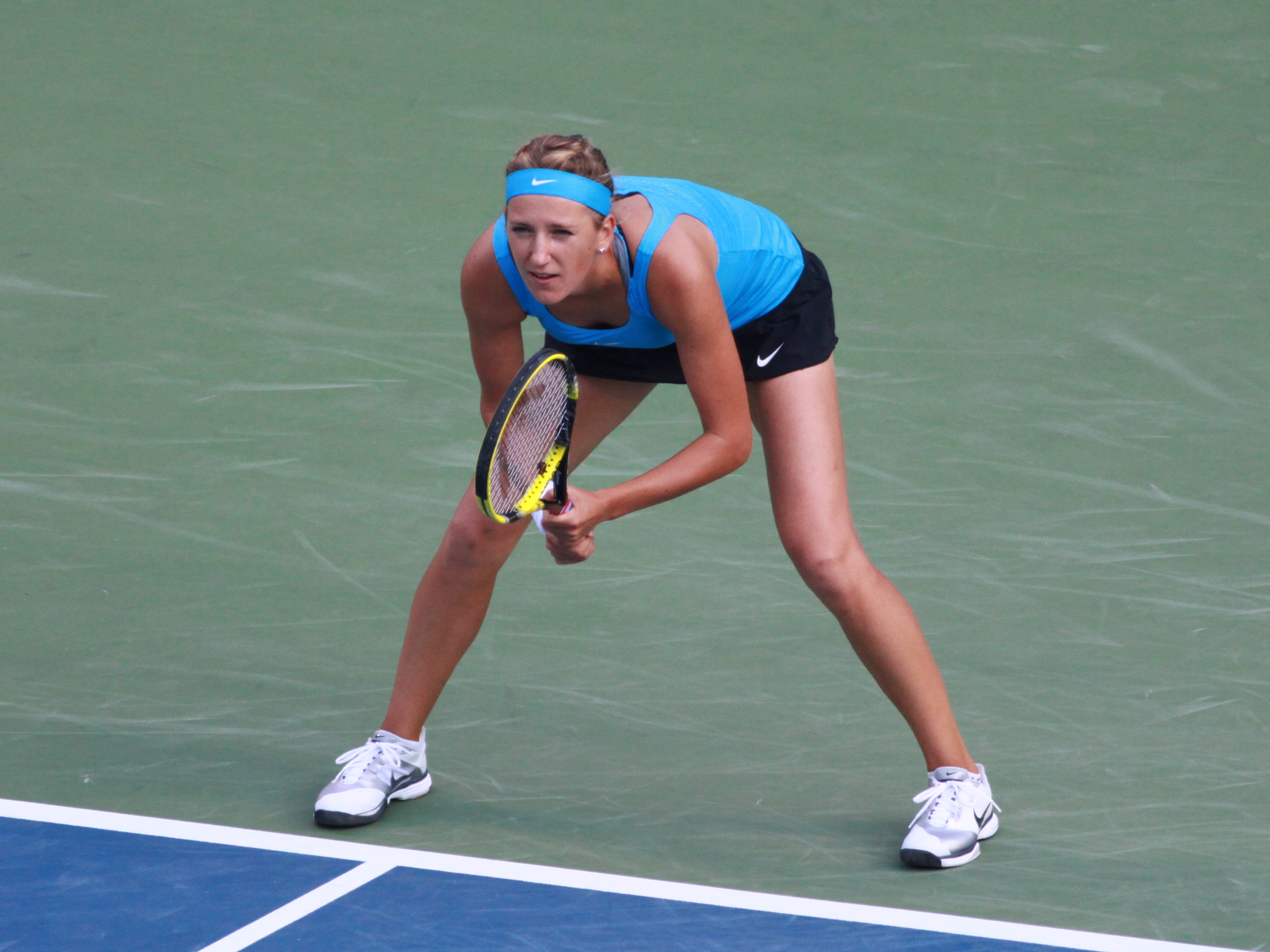
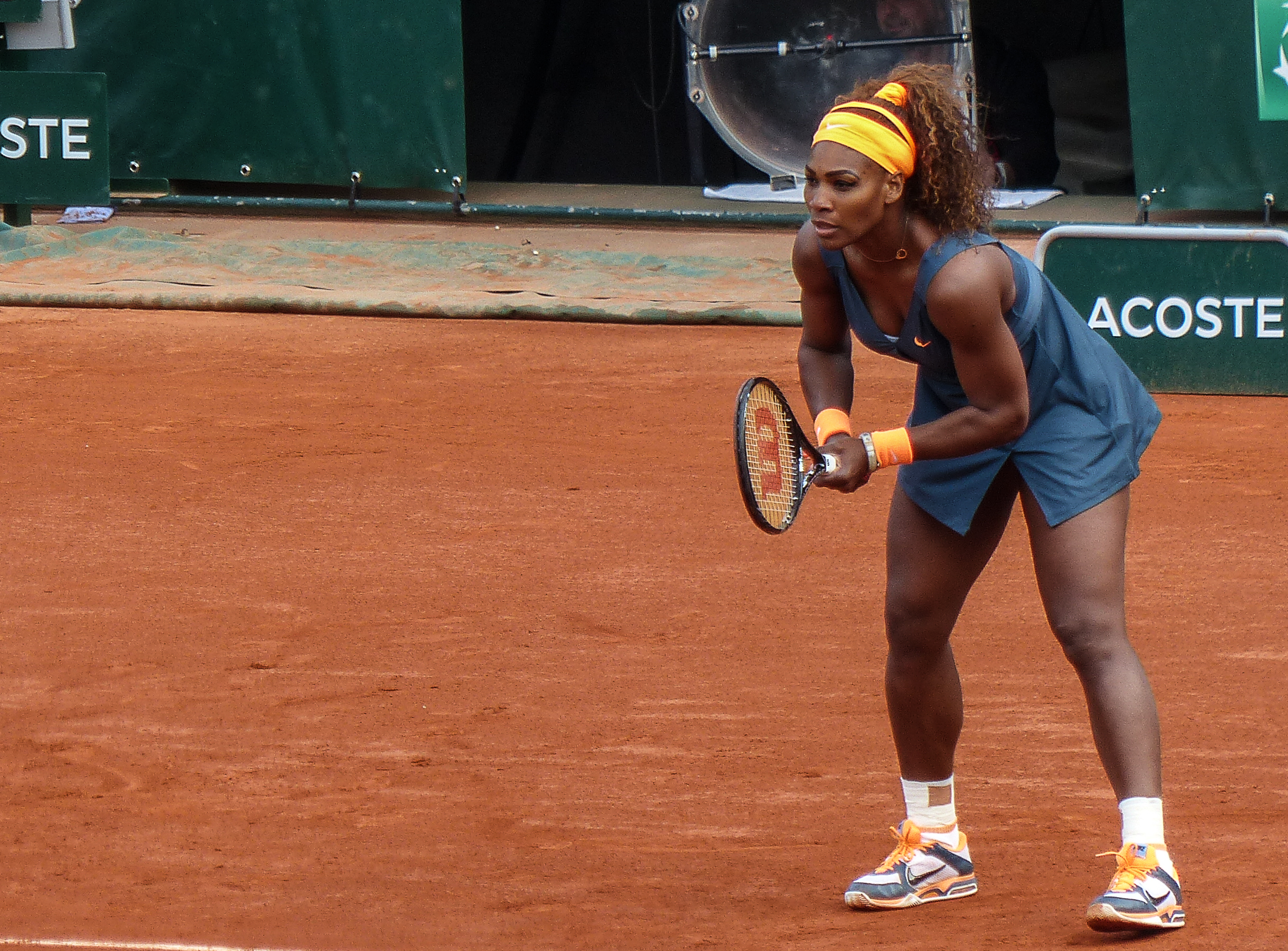
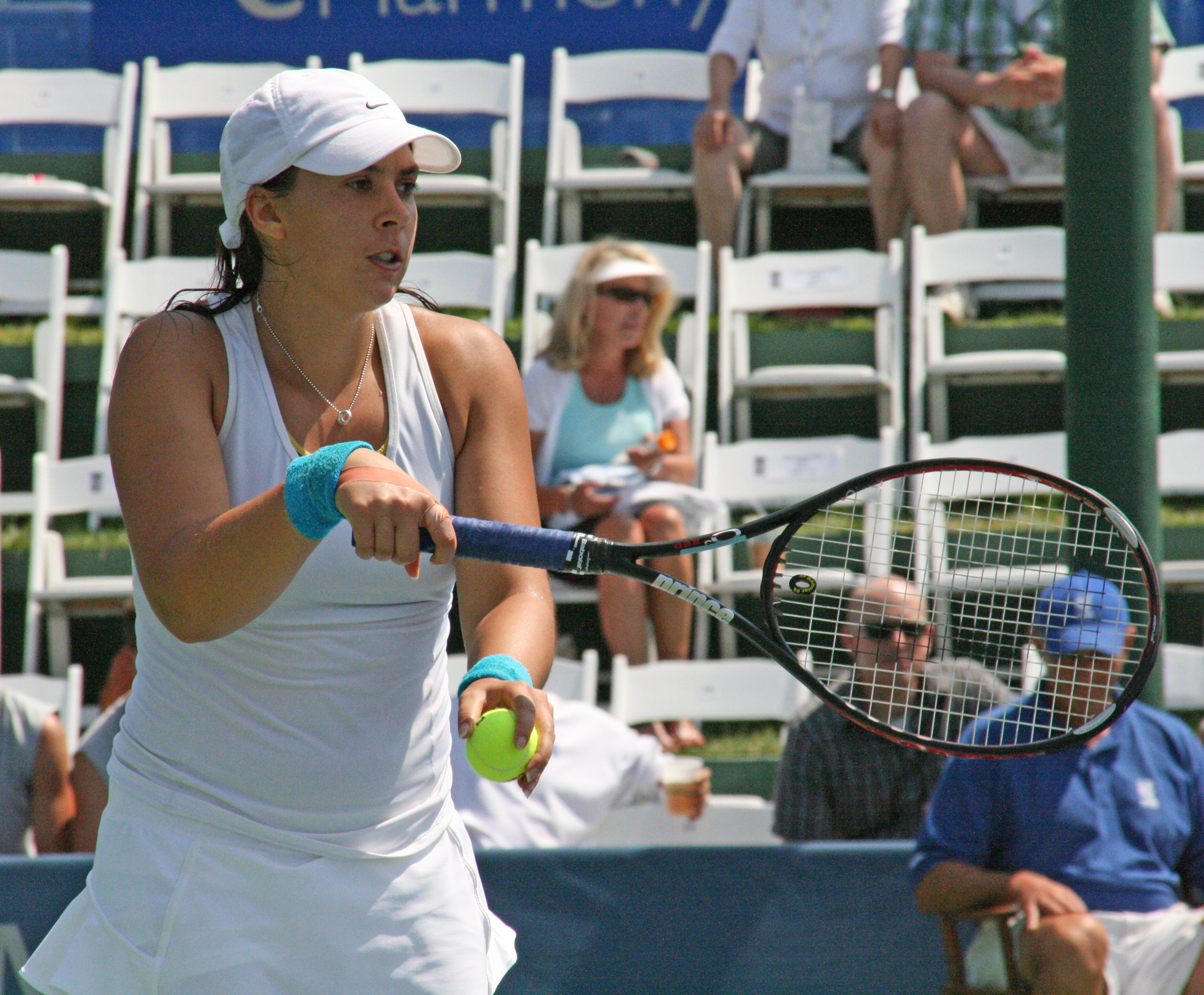
Victoria Azarenka (left) claimed her second major by successfully defending her title at the Australian Open, defeating Li Na in the final. Serena Williams won her second French Open title, defeating defending champion Maria Sharapova in the final, after which she went on to win her fifth title at the US Open, defeating Azarenka in the final, and increasing her total singles Grand Slam titles to seventeen, just one short of both Chris Evert and Martina Navratilova. Marion Bartoli won her first major at Wimbledon, defeating first time Grand Slam finalist Sabine Lisicki, thus becoming the first French player to win a Major since Amélie Mauresmo in 2006. Bartoli would go on the retire from tennis only 6 weeks later at the Western & Southern Open in Cincinnati.

The 2013 WTA Tour was the elite professional tennis circuit organized by the Women's Tennis Association (WTA) for the 2013 tennis season. The 2013 WTA Tour calendar comprised the Grand Slam tournaments (supervised by the International Tennis Federation, the WTA Premier tournaments (Premier Mandatory, Premier 5, and regular Premier), the WTA International tournaments, the Fed Cup (organized by the ITF), and the year-end championships (the WTA Tour Championships and the WTA Tournament of Champions). Also included in the 2013 calendar is the Hopman Cup, which was organized by the ITF and does not distribute ranking points.

== Schedule ==
This was the complete schedule of events on the 2013 calendar, with player progression documented from the quarterfinals stage.

Key

Grand Slam tournaments
Year-end championships
WTA Premier Mandatory
WTA Premier 5
WTA Premier
WTA International
Team events

=== January ===
Week	Tournament	Champions	Runners-up	Semifinalists	Quarterfinalists
31 Dec	Hyundai Hopman Cup; Perth, Australia; ITF Mixed Teams Championships; Hard (i) – $1,000,000 – 8 teams (RR)	Spain; 2–1	Serbia	Round robin (Group A) Australia; Italy; Germany	Round robin (Group B) United States; South Africa; France
31 Dec	Brisbane International; Brisbane, Australia; WTA Premier; Hard – $1,000,000 – 30S/16D; Singles – Doubles	(United States) Serena Williams; 6–2, 6–1	(Russia) Anastasia Pavlyuchenkova	(Belarus) Victoria Azarenka (Ukraine) Lesia Tsurenko	(Kazakhstan) Ksenia Pervak (United States) Sloane Stephens (Germany) Angelique Kerber (Slovakia) Daniela Hantuchová
31 Dec	Brisbane International; Brisbane, Australia; WTA Premier; Hard – $1,000,000 – 30S/16D; Singles – Doubles	(United States) Bethanie Mattek-Sands (India) Sania Mirza; 4–6, 6–4, [10–7]	(Germany) Anna-Lena Grönefeld (Czech Republic) Květa Peschke	(Belarus) Victoria Azarenka (Ukraine) Lesia Tsurenko	(Kazakhstan) Ksenia Pervak (United States) Sloane Stephens (Germany) Angelique Kerber (Slovakia) Daniela Hantuchová
31 Dec	ASB Classic; Auckland, New Zealand; WTA International; Hard – $235,000 – 32S/16D; Singles – Doubles	(Poland) Agnieszka Radwańska; 6–4, 6–4	(Belgium) Yanina Wickmayer	(United States) Jamie Hampton (Germany) Mona Barthel	(Russia) Elena Vesnina (Netherlands) Kiki Bertens (Belgium) Kirsten Flipkens (Sweden) Johanna Larsson
31 Dec	ASB Classic; Auckland, New Zealand; WTA International; Hard – $235,000 – 32S/16D; Singles – Doubles	(Zimbabwe) Cara Black (Australia) Anastasia Rodionova; 2–6, 6–2, [10–5]	(Germany) Julia Görges (Kazakhstan) Yaroslava Shvedova	(United States) Jamie Hampton (Germany) Mona Barthel	(Russia) Elena Vesnina (Netherlands) Kiki Bertens (Belgium) Kirsten Flipkens (Sweden) Johanna Larsson
31 Dec	Shenzhen Gemdale Open; Shenzhen, China; WTA International; Hard – $500,000 – 32S/16D; Singles – Doubles	(China) Li Na; 6–3, 1–6, 7–5	(Czech Republic) Klára Zakopalová	(China) Peng Shuai (Romania) Monica Niculescu	(Serbia) Bojana Jovanovski (Germany) Annika Beck (China) Zhou Yimiao (France) Marion Bartoli
31 Dec	Shenzhen Gemdale Open; Shenzhen, China; WTA International; Hard – $500,000 – 32S/16D; Singles – Doubles	(Chinese Taipei) Chan Hao-ching (Chinese Taipei) Chan Yung-jan; 6–0, 7–5	(Ukraine) Irina Buryachok (Russia) Valeria Solovyeva	(China) Peng Shuai (Romania) Monica Niculescu	(Serbia) Bojana Jovanovski (Germany) Annika Beck (China) Zhou Yimiao (France) Marion Bartoli
7 Jan	Apia International Sydney; Sydney, Australia; WTA Premier; Hard – $690,000 – 30S/16D; Singles – Doubles	(Poland) Agnieszka Radwańska; 6–0, 6–0	(Slovakia) Dominika Cibulková	(China) Li Na (Germany) Angelique Kerber	(Italy) Roberta Vinci (United States) Madison Keys (Italy) Sara Errani (Russia) Svetlana Kuznetsova
7 Jan	Apia International Sydney; Sydney, Australia; WTA Premier; Hard – $690,000 – 30S/16D; Singles – Doubles	(Russia) Nadia Petrova (Slovenia) Katarina Srebotnik; 6–3, 6–4	(Italy) Sara Errani (Italy) Roberta Vinci	(China) Li Na (Germany) Angelique Kerber	(Italy) Roberta Vinci (United States) Madison Keys (Italy) Sara Errani (Russia) Svetlana Kuznetsova
7 Jan	Moorilla Hobart International; Hobart, Australia; WTA International; Hard – $235,000 – 32S/16D; Singles – Doubles	(Russia) Elena Vesnina; 6–3, 6–4	(Germany) Mona Barthel	(Belgium) Kirsten Flipkens (United States) Sloane Stephens	(Romania) Monica Niculescu (Bulgaria) Tsvetana Pironkova (Australia) Jarmila Gajdošová (United States) Lauren Davis
7 Jan	Moorilla Hobart International; Hobart, Australia; WTA International; Hard – $235,000 – 32S/16D; Singles – Doubles	(Spain) Garbiñe Muguruza (Spain) María Teresa Torró Flor; 6–3, 7–6^{(7–5)}	(Hungary) Tímea Babos (Luxembourg) Mandy Minella	(Belgium) Kirsten Flipkens (United States) Sloane Stephens	(Romania) Monica Niculescu (Bulgaria) Tsvetana Pironkova (Australia) Jarmila Gajdošová (United States) Lauren Davis
14 Jan; 21 Jan	Australian Open; Melbourne, Australia; Grand Slam; Hard – $13,712,772 – 128S/96Q/64D/32X; Singles – Doubles – Mixed doubles	(Belarus) Victoria Azarenka; 4–6, 6–4, 6–3	(China) Li Na	(United States) Sloane Stephens (Russia) Maria Sharapova	(Russia) Svetlana Kuznetsova (United States) Serena Williams (Poland) Agnieszka Radwańska (Russia) Ekaterina Makarova
14 Jan; 21 Jan	Australian Open; Melbourne, Australia; Grand Slam; Hard – $13,712,772 – 128S/96Q/64D/32X; Singles – Doubles – Mixed doubles	(Italy) Sara Errani (Italy) Roberta Vinci; 6–2, 3–6, 6–2	(Australia) Ashleigh Barty (Australia) Casey Dellacqua	(United States) Sloane Stephens (Russia) Maria Sharapova	(Russia) Svetlana Kuznetsova (United States) Serena Williams (Poland) Agnieszka Radwańska (Russia) Ekaterina Makarova
14 Jan; 21 Jan	Australian Open; Melbourne, Australia; Grand Slam; Hard – $13,712,772 – 128S/96Q/64D/32X; Singles – Doubles – Mixed doubles	(Australia) Jarmila Gajdošová (Australia) Matthew Ebden; 6–3, 7–5	(Czech Republic) Lucie Hradecká (Czech Republic) František Čermák	(United States) Sloane Stephens (Russia) Maria Sharapova	(Russia) Svetlana Kuznetsova (United States) Serena Williams (Poland) Agnieszka Radwańska (Russia) Ekaterina Makarova
28 Jan	Open GDF Suez; Paris, France; WTA Premier; Hard (i) – $690,000 – 30S/16D; Singles – Doubles	(Germany) Mona Barthel; 7–5, 7–6^{(7–4)}	(Italy) Sara Errani	(Netherlands) Kiki Bertens (France) Kristina Mladenovic	(Spain) Carla Suárez Navarro (Czech Republic) Lucie Šafářová (France) Marion Bartoli (Czech Republic) Petra Kvitová
28 Jan	Open GDF Suez; Paris, France; WTA Premier; Hard (i) – $690,000 – 30S/16D; Singles – Doubles	(Italy) Sara Errani (Italy) Roberta Vinci; 6–1, 6–1	(Czech Republic) Andrea Hlaváčková (United States) Liezel Huber	(Netherlands) Kiki Bertens (France) Kristina Mladenovic	(Spain) Carla Suárez Navarro (Czech Republic) Lucie Šafářová (France) Marion Bartoli (Czech Republic) Petra Kvitová
28 Jan	PTT Pattaya Open; Pattaya, Thailand; WTA International; Hard – $235,000 – 32S/16D; Singles – Doubles	(Russia) Maria Kirilenko; 5–7, 6–1, 7–6^{(7–1)}	(Germany) Sabine Lisicki	(Russia) Nina Bratchikova (Romania) Sorana Cîrstea	(Japan) Ayumi Morita (New Zealand) Marina Erakovic (Latvia) Anastasija Sevastova (Russia) Elena Vesnina
28 Jan	PTT Pattaya Open; Pattaya, Thailand; WTA International; Hard – $235,000 – 32S/16D; Singles – Doubles	(Japan) Kimiko Date-Krumm (Australia) Casey Dellacqua; 6–3, 6–2	(Uzbekistan) Akgul Amanmuradova (Russia) Alexandra Panova	(Russia) Nina Bratchikova (Romania) Sorana Cîrstea	(Japan) Ayumi Morita (New Zealand) Marina Erakovic (Latvia) Anastasija Sevastova (Russia) Elena Vesnina

=== February ===
Week	Tournament	Champions	Runners-up	Semifinalists	Quarterfinalists
4 Feb	Fed Cup by BNP Paribas Quarterfinals; Ostrava, Czech Republic – Hard (i); Rimini, Italy – Clay (red) (i); Moscow, Russia – Hard (i); Niš, Serbia – Hard (i)	Quarterfinals winners Czech Republic 4–0; Italy 3–2; Russia 3–2; Slovakia 3–2	Quarterfinals losers Australia; United States; Japan; Serbia		
11 Feb	Qatar Total Open; Doha, Qatar; WTA Premier 5 Hard – $2,369,000 – 56S/16D; Singles – Doubles	(Belarus) Victoria Azarenka; 7–6^{(8–6)}, 2–6, 6–3	(United States) Serena Williams	(Poland) Agnieszka Radwańska (Russia) Maria Sharapova	(Italy) Sara Errani (Denmark) Caroline Wozniacki (Australia) Samantha Stosur (Czech Republic) Petra Kvitová
11 Feb	Qatar Total Open; Doha, Qatar; WTA Premier 5 Hard – $2,369,000 – 56S/16D; Singles – Doubles	(Italy) Sara Errani (Italy) Roberta Vinci; 2–6, 6–3, [10–6]	(Russia) Nadia Petrova (Slovenia) Katarina Srebotnik	(Poland) Agnieszka Radwańska (Russia) Maria Sharapova	(Italy) Sara Errani (Denmark) Caroline Wozniacki (Australia) Samantha Stosur (Czech Republic) Petra Kvitová
18 Feb	Dubai Duty Free Tennis Championships; Dubai, United Arab Emirates; WTA Premier; Hard – $2,000,000 – 28S/16D; Singles – Doubles	(Czech Republic) Petra Kvitová; 6–2, 1–6, 6–1	(Italy) Sara Errani	(Italy) Roberta Vinci (Denmark) Caroline Wozniacki	(Russia) Nadia Petrova (Australia) Samantha Stosur (Poland) Agnieszka Radwańska (France) Marion Bartoli
18 Feb	Dubai Duty Free Tennis Championships; Dubai, United Arab Emirates; WTA Premier; Hard – $2,000,000 – 28S/16D; Singles – Doubles	(United States) Bethanie Mattek-Sands (India) Sania Mirza; 6–4, 2–6, [10–7]	(Russia) Nadia Petrova (Slovenia) Katarina Srebotnik	(Italy) Roberta Vinci (Denmark) Caroline Wozniacki	(Russia) Nadia Petrova (Australia) Samantha Stosur (Poland) Agnieszka Radwańska (France) Marion Bartoli
18 Feb	Copa Colsanitas; Bogotá, Colombia; WTA International; Clay (red) – $235,000 – 32S/16D; Singles – Doubles	(Serbia) Jelena Janković; 6–1, 6–2	(Argentina) Paula Ormaechea	(Italy) Karin Knapp (Brazil) Teliana Pereira	(Romania) Alexandra Cadanțu (Spain) Lara Arruabarrena Vecino (Spain) María Teresa Torró Flor (Luxembourg) Mandy Minella
18 Feb	Copa Colsanitas; Bogotá, Colombia; WTA International; Clay (red) – $235,000 – 32S/16D; Singles – Doubles	(Hungary) Tímea Babos (Luxembourg) Mandy Minella; 6–4, 6–3	(Czech Republic) Eva Birnerová (Russia) Alexandra Panova	(Italy) Karin Knapp (Brazil) Teliana Pereira	(Romania) Alexandra Cadanțu (Spain) Lara Arruabarrena Vecino (Spain) María Teresa Torró Flor (Luxembourg) Mandy Minella
18 Feb	U.S. National Indoor Tennis Championships; Memphis, United States; WTA International; Hard (i) – $235,000 – 32S/16D; Singles – Doubles	(New Zealand) Marina Erakovic; 6–1, retired	(Germany) Sabine Lisicki	(Slovakia) Magdaléna Rybáriková (Switzerland) Stefanie Vögele	(Belgium) Kirsten Flipkens (France) Kristina Mladenovic (United Kingdom) Heather Watson (United States) Jamie Hampton
18 Feb	U.S. National Indoor Tennis Championships; Memphis, United States; WTA International; Hard (i) – $235,000 – 32S/16D; Singles – Doubles	(France) Kristina Mladenovic (Kazakhstan) Galina Voskoboeva; 7–6^{(7–5)}, 6–3	(Sweden) Sofia Arvidsson (Sweden) Johanna Larsson	(Slovakia) Magdaléna Rybáriková (Switzerland) Stefanie Vögele	(Belgium) Kirsten Flipkens (France) Kristina Mladenovic (United Kingdom) Heather Watson (United States) Jamie Hampton
25 Feb	Abierto Mexicano TELCEL; Acapulco, Mexico; WTA International; Clay (red) – $235,000 – 32S/16D; Singles – Doubles	(Italy) Sara Errani; 6–0, 6–4	(Spain) Carla Suárez Navarro	(France) Alizé Cornet (Spain) Sílvia Soler Espinosa	(Netherlands) Kiki Bertens (Spain) Lourdes Domínguez Lino (Italy) Karin Knapp (Italy) Francesca Schiavone
25 Feb	Abierto Mexicano TELCEL; Acapulco, Mexico; WTA International; Clay (red) – $235,000 – 32S/16D; Singles – Doubles	(Spain) Lourdes Domínguez Lino (Spain) Arantxa Parra Santonja; 6–4, 7–6^{(7–1)}	(Colombia) Catalina Castaño (Colombia) Mariana Duque Mariño	(France) Alizé Cornet (Spain) Sílvia Soler Espinosa	(Netherlands) Kiki Bertens (Spain) Lourdes Domínguez Lino (Italy) Karin Knapp (Italy) Francesca Schiavone
25 Feb	BMW Malaysian Open; Kuala Lumpur, Malaysia; WTA International; Hard – $235,000 – 32S/16D; Singles – Doubles	(Czech Republic) Karolína Plíšková; 1–6, 7–5, 6–3	(United States) Bethanie Mattek-Sands	(Japan) Ayumi Morita (Russia) Anastasia Pavlyuchenkova	(Austria) Patricia Mayr-Achleitner (Thailand) Luksika Kumkhum (Australia) Ashleigh Barty (Chinese Taipei) Hsieh Su-wei
25 Feb	BMW Malaysian Open; Kuala Lumpur, Malaysia; WTA International; Hard – $235,000 – 32S/16D; Singles – Doubles	(Japan) Shuko Aoyama (Chinese Taipei) Chang Kai-chen; 6–7^{(4–7)}, 7–6^{(7–4)}, [14–12]	(Slovakia) Janette Husárová (China) Zhang Shuai	(Japan) Ayumi Morita (Russia) Anastasia Pavlyuchenkova	(Austria) Patricia Mayr-Achleitner (Thailand) Luksika Kumkhum (Australia) Ashleigh Barty (Chinese Taipei) Hsieh Su-wei
25 Feb	Brasil Tennis Cup; Florianópolis, Brazil; WTA International; Hard – $235,000 – 32S/16D; Singles – Doubles	(Romania) Monica Niculescu; 6–2, 4–6, 6–4	(Russia) Olga Puchkova	(United States) Venus Williams (France) Kristina Mladenovic	(Slovakia) Magdaléna Rybáriková (Slovakia) Jana Čepelová (Hungary) Tímea Babos (Hungary) Melinda Czink
25 Feb	Brasil Tennis Cup; Florianópolis, Brazil; WTA International; Hard – $235,000 – 32S/16D; Singles – Doubles	(Spain) Anabel Medina Garrigues (Kazakhstan) Yaroslava Shvedova; 6–0, 6–4	(United Kingdom) Anne Keothavong (Russia) Valeria Savinykh	(United States) Venus Williams (France) Kristina Mladenovic	(Slovakia) Magdaléna Rybáriková (Slovakia) Jana Čepelová (Hungary) Tímea Babos (Hungary) Melinda Czink

=== March ===
Week	Tournament	Champions	Runners-up	Semifinalists	Quarterfinalists
4 Mar; 11 Mar	BNP Paribas Open; Indian Wells, United States; WTA Premier Mandatory; Hard – $5,185,625 – 96S/32D; Singles – Doubles	(Russia) Maria Sharapova; 6–2, 6–2	(Denmark) Caroline Wozniacki	(Germany) Angelique Kerber (Russia) Maria Kirilenko	(Belarus) Victoria Azarenka (Australia) Samantha Stosur (Czech Republic) Petra Kvitová (Italy) Sara Errani
4 Mar; 11 Mar	BNP Paribas Open; Indian Wells, United States; WTA Premier Mandatory; Hard – $5,185,625 – 96S/32D; Singles – Doubles	(Russia) Ekaterina Makarova (Russia) Elena Vesnina; 6–0, 5–7, [10–6]	(Russia) Nadia Petrova (Slovenia) Katarina Srebotnik	(Germany) Angelique Kerber (Russia) Maria Kirilenko	(Belarus) Victoria Azarenka (Australia) Samantha Stosur (Czech Republic) Petra Kvitová (Italy) Sara Errani
18 Mar; 25 Mar	Sony Open Tennis; Key Biscayne, United States; WTA Premier Mandatory; Hard – $5,185,625 – 96S/32D; Singles – Doubles	(United States) Serena Williams; 4–6, 6–3, 6–0	(Russia) Maria Sharapova	(Poland) Agnieszka Radwańska (Serbia) Jelena Janković	(China) Li Na (Belgium) Kirsten Flipkens (Italy) Sara Errani (Italy) Roberta Vinci
18 Mar; 25 Mar	Sony Open Tennis; Key Biscayne, United States; WTA Premier Mandatory; Hard – $5,185,625 – 96S/32D; Singles – Doubles	(Russia) Nadia Petrova (Slovenia) Katarina Srebotnik; 6–1, 7–6^{(7–2)}	(United States) Lisa Raymond (United Kingdom) Laura Robson	(Poland) Agnieszka Radwańska (Serbia) Jelena Janković	(China) Li Na (Belgium) Kirsten Flipkens (Italy) Sara Errani (Italy) Roberta Vinci

=== April ===
Week	Tournament	Champions	Runners-up	Semifinalists	Quarterfinalists
1 Apr	Family Circle Cup; Charleston, United States; WTA Premier; Clay – $795,707 (Green) – 56S/16D; Singles – Doubles	(United States) Serena Williams; 3–6, 6–0, 6–2	(Serbia) Jelena Janković	(United States) Venus Williams (Switzerland) Stefanie Vögele	(Czech Republic) Lucie Šafářová (United States) Madison Keys (Canada) Eugenie Bouchard (Denmark) Caroline Wozniacki
1 Apr	Family Circle Cup; Charleston, United States; WTA Premier; Clay – $795,707 (Green) – 56S/16D; Singles – Doubles	(France) Kristina Mladenovic (Czech Republic) Lucie Šafářová; 6–3, 7–6^{(8–6)}	(Czech Republic) Andrea Hlaváčková (United States) Liezel Huber	(United States) Venus Williams (Switzerland) Stefanie Vögele	(Czech Republic) Lucie Šafářová (United States) Madison Keys (Canada) Eugenie Bouchard (Denmark) Caroline Wozniacki
1 Apr	Monterrey Open; Monterrey, Mexico; WTA International; Hard – $235,000 – 32S/16D; Singles – Doubles	(Russia) Anastasia Pavlyuchenkova; 4–6, 6–2, 6–4	(Germany) Angelique Kerber	(Russia) Maria Kirilenko (Romania) Monica Niculescu	(Japan) Ayumi Morita (Poland) Urszula Radwańska (Hungary) Tímea Babos (United States) Lauren Davis
1 Apr	Monterrey Open; Monterrey, Mexico; WTA International; Hard – $235,000 – 32S/16D; Singles – Doubles	(Hungary) Tímea Babos (Japan) Kimiko Date-Krumm; 6–1, 6–4	(Czech Republic) Eva Birnerová (Thailand) Tamarine Tanasugarn	(Russia) Maria Kirilenko (Romania) Monica Niculescu	(Japan) Ayumi Morita (Poland) Urszula Radwańska (Hungary) Tímea Babos (United States) Lauren Davis
8 Apr	BNP Paribas Katowice Open; Katowice, Poland; WTA International; Clay (red) (i) – $235,000 – 32S/16D; Singles – Doubles	(Italy) Roberta Vinci; 7–6^{(7–2)}, 6–1	(Czech Republic) Petra Kvitová	(Romania) Alexandra Cadanțu (Germany) Annika Beck	(Croatia) Petra Martić (Israel) Shahar Pe'er (Italy) Maria Elena Camerin (Czech Republic) Karolína Plíšková
8 Apr	BNP Paribas Katowice Open; Katowice, Poland; WTA International; Clay (red) (i) – $235,000 – 32S/16D; Singles – Doubles	(Spain) Lara Arruabarrena (Spain) Lourdes Domínguez Lino; 6–4, 7–5	(Romania) Raluca Olaru (Russia) Valeria Solovyeva	(Romania) Alexandra Cadanțu (Germany) Annika Beck	(Croatia) Petra Martić (Israel) Shahar Pe'er (Italy) Maria Elena Camerin (Czech Republic) Karolína Plíšková
15 Apr	Fed Cup by BNP Paribas Semifinals; Palermo, Italy – Clay; Moscow, Russia – Hard (i)	Semifinals winners Italy 3–1; Russia 3–2	Semifinals losers Czech Republic; Slovakia		
22 Apr	Porsche Tennis Grand Prix; Stuttgart, Germany; WTA Premier; Clay (red) (i) – $795,707 – 28S/16D; Singles – Doubles	(Russia) Maria Sharapova; 6–4, 6–3	(China) Li Na	(Germany) Angelique Kerber (United States) Bethanie Mattek-Sands	(Serbia) Ana Ivanovic (Kazakhstan) Yaroslava Shvedova (Germany) Sabine Lisicki (Czech Republic) Petra Kvitová
22 Apr	Porsche Tennis Grand Prix; Stuttgart, Germany; WTA Premier; Clay (red) (i) – $795,707 – 28S/16D; Singles – Doubles	(Germany) Mona Barthel (Germany) Sabine Lisicki; 6–4, 7–5	(United States) Bethanie Mattek-Sands (India) Sania Mirza	(Germany) Angelique Kerber (United States) Bethanie Mattek-Sands	(Serbia) Ana Ivanovic (Kazakhstan) Yaroslava Shvedova (Germany) Sabine Lisicki (Czech Republic) Petra Kvitová
22 Apr	Grand Prix de SAR La Princesse Lalla Meryem; Marrakesh, Morocco; WTA International; Clay (red) – $235,000 – 32S/16D; Singles – Doubles	(Italy) Francesca Schiavone; 6–1, 6–3	(Spain) Lourdes Domínguez Lino	(Luxembourg) Mandy Minella (South Africa) Chanelle Scheepers	(Netherlands) Kiki Bertens (Spain) Sílvia Soler Espinosa (France) Alizé Cornet (France) Kristina Mladenovic
22 Apr	Grand Prix de SAR La Princesse Lalla Meryem; Marrakesh, Morocco; WTA International; Clay (red) – $235,000 – 32S/16D; Singles – Doubles	(Hungary) Tímea Babos (Luxembourg) Mandy Minella; 6–3, 6–1	(Croatia) Petra Martić (France) Kristina Mladenovic	(Luxembourg) Mandy Minella (South Africa) Chanelle Scheepers	(Netherlands) Kiki Bertens (Spain) Sílvia Soler Espinosa (France) Alizé Cornet (France) Kristina Mladenovic
29 Apr	Portugal Open; Oeiras, Portugal; WTA International; Clay (red) – $235,000 – 32S/16D; Singles – Doubles	(Russia) Anastasia Pavlyuchenkova; 7–5, 6–2	(Spain) Carla Suárez Navarro	(Switzerland) Romina Oprandi (Estonia) Kaia Kanepi	(Russia) Svetlana Kuznetsova (Russia) Elena Vesnina (Puerto Rico) Monica Puig (Japan) Ayumi Morita
29 Apr	Portugal Open; Oeiras, Portugal; WTA International; Clay (red) – $235,000 – 32S/16D; Singles – Doubles	(Chinese Taipei) Chan Hao-ching (France) Kristina Mladenovic; 7–6^{(7–3)}, 6–2	(Croatia) Darija Jurak (Hungary) Katalin Marosi	(Switzerland) Romina Oprandi (Estonia) Kaia Kanepi	(Russia) Svetlana Kuznetsova (Russia) Elena Vesnina (Puerto Rico) Monica Puig (Japan) Ayumi Morita

=== May ===
Week	Tournament	Champions	Runners-up	Semifinalists	Quarterfinalists
6 May	Mutua Madrid Open; Madrid, Spain; WTA Premier Mandatory; Clay (red) – €4,033,254 – 64S/28D; Singles – Doubles	(United States) Serena Williams; 6–1, 6–4	(Russia) Maria Sharapova	(Italy) Sara Errani (Serbia) Ana Ivanovic	(Spain) Anabel Medina Garrigues (Russia) Ekaterina Makarova (Germany) Angelique Kerber (Estonia) Kaia Kanepi
6 May	Mutua Madrid Open; Madrid, Spain; WTA Premier Mandatory; Clay (red) – €4,033,254 – 64S/28D; Singles – Doubles	(Russia) Anastasia Pavlyuchenkova (Czech Republic) Lucie Šafářová; 6–2, 6–4	(Zimbabwe) Cara Black (New Zealand) Marina Erakovic	(Italy) Sara Errani (Serbia) Ana Ivanovic	(Spain) Anabel Medina Garrigues (Russia) Ekaterina Makarova (Germany) Angelique Kerber (Estonia) Kaia Kanepi
13 May	Internazionali BNL d'Italia; Rome, Italy; WTA Premier 5 Clay (red) – $2,369,000 – 56S/28D; Singles – Doubles	(United States) Serena Williams; 6–1, 6–3	(Belarus) Victoria Azarenka	(Romania) Simona Halep (Italy) Sara Errani	(Spain) Carla Suárez Navarro (Serbia) Jelena Janković (Australia) Samantha Stosur (Russia) Maria Sharapova
13 May	Internazionali BNL d'Italia; Rome, Italy; WTA Premier 5 Clay (red) – $2,369,000 – 56S/28D; Singles – Doubles	(Chinese Taipei) Hsieh Su-wei (China) Peng Shuai; 4–6, 6–3, [10–8]	(Italy) Sara Errani (Italy) Roberta Vinci	(Romania) Simona Halep (Italy) Sara Errani	(Spain) Carla Suárez Navarro (Serbia) Jelena Janković (Australia) Samantha Stosur (Russia) Maria Sharapova
20 May	Brussels Open; Brussels, Belgium; WTA Premier; Clay (red) – $690,000 – 30S/16D; Singles – Doubles	(Estonia) Kaia Kanepi; 6–2, 7–5	(China) Peng Shuai	(Switzerland) Romina Oprandi (United States) Jamie Hampton	(China) Zheng Jie (United States) Sloane Stephens (United States) Varvara Lepchenko (Italy) Roberta Vinci
20 May	Brussels Open; Brussels, Belgium; WTA Premier; Clay (red) – $690,000 – 30S/16D; Singles – Doubles	(Germany) Anna-Lena Grönefeld (Czech Republic) Květa Peschke; 6–0, 6–3	(Canada) Gabriela Dabrowski (Israel) Shahar Pe'er	(Switzerland) Romina Oprandi (United States) Jamie Hampton	(China) Zheng Jie (United States) Sloane Stephens (United States) Varvara Lepchenko (Italy) Roberta Vinci
20 May	Internationaux de Strasbourg; Strasbourg, France; WTA International; Clay (red) – $235,000 – 32S/16D; Singles – Doubles	(France) Alizé Cornet; 7–6^{(7–4)}, 6–0	(Czech Republic) Lucie Hradecká	(Canada) Eugenie Bouchard (Italy) Flavia Pennetta	(Georgia (country)) Anna Tatishvili (South Africa) Chanelle Scheepers (Japan) Misaki Doi (Sweden) Johanna Larsson
20 May	Internationaux de Strasbourg; Strasbourg, France; WTA International; Clay (red) – $235,000 – 32S/16D; Singles – Doubles	(Japan) Kimiko Date-Krumm (South Africa) Chanelle Scheepers; 6–4, 3–6, [14–12]	(Zimbabwe) Cara Black (New Zealand) Marina Erakovic	(Canada) Eugenie Bouchard (Italy) Flavia Pennetta	(Georgia (country)) Anna Tatishvili (South Africa) Chanelle Scheepers (Japan) Misaki Doi (Sweden) Johanna Larsson
27 May; 3 Jun	French Open; Paris, France; Grand Slam; Clay (red) – $12,957,474 – 128S/96Q/64D/32X; Singles – Doubles – Mixed doubles	(United States) Serena Williams; 6–4, 6–4	(Russia) Maria Sharapova	(Italy) Sara Errani (Belarus) Victoria Azarenka	(Russia) Svetlana Kuznetsova (Poland) Agnieszka Radwańska (Russia) Maria Kirilenko (Serbia) Jelena Janković
27 May; 3 Jun	French Open; Paris, France; Grand Slam; Clay (red) – $12,957,474 – 128S/96Q/64D/32X; Singles – Doubles – Mixed doubles	(Russia) Ekaterina Makarova (Russia) Elena Vesnina; 7–5, 6–2	(Italy) Sara Errani (Italy) Roberta Vinci	(Italy) Sara Errani (Belarus) Victoria Azarenka	(Russia) Svetlana Kuznetsova (Poland) Agnieszka Radwańska (Russia) Maria Kirilenko (Serbia) Jelena Janković
27 May; 3 Jun	French Open; Paris, France; Grand Slam; Clay (red) – $12,957,474 – 128S/96Q/64D/32X; Singles – Doubles – Mixed doubles	(Czech Republic) Lucie Hradecká (Czech Republic) František Čermák; 1–6, 6–4, [10–5]	(France) Kristina Mladenovic (Canada) Daniel Nestor	(Italy) Sara Errani (Belarus) Victoria Azarenka	(Russia) Svetlana Kuznetsova (Poland) Agnieszka Radwańska (Russia) Maria Kirilenko (Serbia) Jelena Janković

=== June ===
Week	Tournament	Champions	Runners-up	Semifinalists	Quarterfinalists
10 Jun	Aegon Classic; Birmingham, Great Britain; WTA International; Grass – $235,000 – 56S/16D; Singles – Doubles	(Slovakia) Daniela Hantuchová; 7–6^{(7–5)}, 6–4	(Croatia) Donna Vekić	(Slovakia) Magdaléna Rybáriková (United States) Alison Riske	(United States) Madison Keys (Romania) Sorana Cîrstea (Germany) Sabine Lisicki (Italy) Francesca Schiavone
10 Jun	Aegon Classic; Birmingham, Great Britain; WTA International; Grass – $235,000 – 56S/16D; Singles – Doubles	(Australia) Ashleigh Barty (Australia) Casey Dellacqua; 7–5, 6–4	(Zimbabwe) Cara Black (New Zealand) Marina Erakovic	(Slovakia) Magdaléna Rybáriková (United States) Alison Riske	(United States) Madison Keys (Romania) Sorana Cîrstea (Germany) Sabine Lisicki (Italy) Francesca Schiavone
10 Jun	Nürnberger Versicherungscup; Nuremberg, Germany; WTA International; Clay (red) – $235,000 – 32S/16D; Singles – Doubles	(Romania) Simona Halep; 6–3, 6–3	(Germany) Andrea Petkovic	(Serbia) Jelena Janković (Czech Republic) Lucie Šafářová	(Spain) Lourdes Domínguez Lino (Germany) Annika Beck (Kazakhstan) Galina Voskoboeva (Slovenia) Polona Hercog
10 Jun	Nürnberger Versicherungscup; Nuremberg, Germany; WTA International; Clay (red) – $235,000 – 32S/16D; Singles – Doubles	(Romania) Raluca Olaru (Russia) Valeria Solovyeva; 2–6, 7–6^{(7–3)}, [11–9]	(Germany) Anna-Lena Grönefeld (Czech Republic) Květa Peschke	(Serbia) Jelena Janković (Czech Republic) Lucie Šafářová	(Spain) Lourdes Domínguez Lino (Germany) Annika Beck (Kazakhstan) Galina Voskoboeva (Slovenia) Polona Hercog
17 Jun	Aegon International; Eastbourne, Great Britain; WTA Premier; Grass – $690,000 – 32S/16D; Singles – Doubles	(Russia) Elena Vesnina; 6–2, 6–1	(United States) Jamie Hampton	(Denmark) Caroline Wozniacki (Belgium) Yanina Wickmayer	(Czech Republic) Lucie Šafářová (Russia) Ekaterina Makarova (Russia) Maria Kirilenko (China) Li Na
17 Jun	Aegon International; Eastbourne, Great Britain; WTA Premier; Grass – $690,000 – 32S/16D; Singles – Doubles	(Russia) Nadia Petrova (Slovenia) Katarina Srebotnik; 6–3, 6–3	(Romania) Monica Niculescu (Czech Republic) Klára Zakopalová	(Denmark) Caroline Wozniacki (Belgium) Yanina Wickmayer	(Czech Republic) Lucie Šafářová (Russia) Ekaterina Makarova (Russia) Maria Kirilenko (China) Li Na
17 Jun	Topshelf Open 's-Hertogenbosch, Netherlands; WTA International; Grass – $235,000 – 32S/16D; Singles – Doubles	(Romania) Simona Halep; 6–4, 6–2	(Belgium) Kirsten Flipkens	(Spain) Carla Suárez Navarro (Spain) Garbiñe Muguruza	(Ukraine) Lesia Tsurenko (Bulgaria) Tsvetana Pironkova (Poland) Urszula Radwańska (Slovakia) Dominika Cibulková
17 Jun	Topshelf Open 's-Hertogenbosch, Netherlands; WTA International; Grass – $235,000 – 32S/16D; Singles – Doubles	(Romania) Irina-Camelia Begu (Spain) Anabel Medina Garrigues; 4–6, 7–6^{(7–3)}, [11–9]	(Slovakia) Dominika Cibulková (Spain) Arantxa Parra Santonja	(Spain) Carla Suárez Navarro (Spain) Garbiñe Muguruza	(Ukraine) Lesia Tsurenko (Bulgaria) Tsvetana Pironkova (Poland) Urszula Radwańska (Slovakia) Dominika Cibulková
24 Jun; 1 Jul	The Championships, Wimbledon; London, Great Britain; Grand Slam; Grass – $16,775,934 – 128S/96Q/64D/48X; Singles – Doubles – Mixed doubles	(France) Marion Bartoli; 6–1, 6–4	(Germany) Sabine Lisicki	(Poland) Agnieszka Radwańska (Belgium) Kirsten Flipkens	(Estonia) Kaia Kanepi (China) Li Na (United States) Sloane Stephens (Czech Republic) Petra Kvitová
24 Jun; 1 Jul	The Championships, Wimbledon; London, Great Britain; Grand Slam; Grass – $16,775,934 – 128S/96Q/64D/48X; Singles – Doubles – Mixed doubles	(Chinese Taipei) Hsieh Su-wei (China) Peng Shuai; 7–6^{(7–1)}, 6–1	(Australia) Ashleigh Barty (Australia) Casey Dellacqua	(Poland) Agnieszka Radwańska (Belgium) Kirsten Flipkens	(Estonia) Kaia Kanepi (China) Li Na (United States) Sloane Stephens (Czech Republic) Petra Kvitová
24 Jun; 1 Jul	The Championships, Wimbledon; London, Great Britain; Grand Slam; Grass – $16,775,934 – 128S/96Q/64D/48X; Singles – Doubles – Mixed doubles	(Canada) Daniel Nestor (France) Kristina Mladenovic; 5–7, 6–2, 8–6	(Brazil) Bruno Soares (United States) Lisa Raymond	(Poland) Agnieszka Radwańska (Belgium) Kirsten Flipkens	(Estonia) Kaia Kanepi (China) Li Na (United States) Sloane Stephens (Czech Republic) Petra Kvitová

=== July ===
Week	Tournament	Champions	Runners-up	Semifinalists	Quarterfinalists
8 Jul	Budapest Grand Prix; Budapest, Hungary; WTA International; Clay (red) – $235,000 – 32S/0Q/8D^{[a]} Singles – Doubles	(Romania) Simona Halep; 6–3, 6–7^{(7–9)}, 6–1	(Austria) Yvonne Meusburger	(South Africa) Chanelle Scheepers (Romania) Alexandra Cadanțu	(Montenegro) Danka Kovinić (Germany) Annika Beck (Hungary) Tímea Babos (Israel) Shahar Pe'er
8 Jul	Budapest Grand Prix; Budapest, Hungary; WTA International; Clay (red) – $235,000 – 32S/0Q/8D^{[a]} Singles – Doubles	(Czech Republic) Andrea Hlaváčková (Czech Republic) Lucie Hradecká; 6–4, 6–1	(Russia) Nina Bratchikova (Georgia (country)) Anna Tatishvili	(South Africa) Chanelle Scheepers (Romania) Alexandra Cadanțu	(Montenegro) Danka Kovinić (Germany) Annika Beck (Hungary) Tímea Babos (Israel) Shahar Pe'er
8 Jul	XXVI Internazionali WTA di Sicilia; Palermo, Italy; WTA International; Clay (red) – $235,000 – 32S/16D; Singles – Doubles	(Italy) Roberta Vinci; 6–3, 3–6, 6–3	(Italy) Sara Errani	(Czech Republic) Klára Zakopalová (Spain) Estrella Cabeza Candela	(Spain) Sílvia Soler Espinosa (Germany) Dinah Pfizenmaier (Czech Republic) Renata Voráčová (Spain) Lourdes Domínguez Lino
8 Jul	XXVI Internazionali WTA di Sicilia; Palermo, Italy; WTA International; Clay (red) – $235,000 – 32S/16D; Singles – Doubles	(France) Kristina Mladenovic (Poland) Katarzyna Piter; 6–1, 5–7, [10–8]	(Czech Republic) Karolína Plíšková (Czech Republic) Kristýna Plíšková	(Czech Republic) Klára Zakopalová (Spain) Estrella Cabeza Candela	(Spain) Sílvia Soler Espinosa (Germany) Dinah Pfizenmaier (Czech Republic) Renata Voráčová (Spain) Lourdes Domínguez Lino
15 Jul	NÜRNBERGER Gastein Ladies; Bad Gastein, Austria; WTA International; Clay (red) – $235,000 – 32S/16D; Singles – Doubles	(Austria) Yvonne Meusberger; 7–5, 6–2	(Czech Republic) Andrea Hlaváčková	(Ukraine) Elina Svitolina (Italy) Karin Knapp	(Austria) Lisa-Maria Moser (Austria) Patricia Mayr-Achleitner (Netherlands) Arantxa Rus (Germany) Annika Beck
15 Jul	NÜRNBERGER Gastein Ladies; Bad Gastein, Austria; WTA International; Clay (red) – $235,000 – 32S/16D; Singles – Doubles	(Austria) Sandra Klemenschits (Slovenia) Andreja Klepač; 6–1, 6–4	(Germany) Kristina Barrois (Greece) Eleni Daniilidou	(Ukraine) Elina Svitolina (Italy) Karin Knapp	(Austria) Lisa-Maria Moser (Austria) Patricia Mayr-Achleitner (Netherlands) Arantxa Rus (Germany) Annika Beck
15 Jul	Collector Swedish Open; Båstad, Sweden; WTA International; Clay (red) – $235,000 – 32S/16D; Singles – Doubles	(United States) Serena Williams; 6–4, 6–1	(Sweden) Johanna Larsson	(Czech Republic) Klára Zakopalová (Italy) Flavia Pennetta	(Spain) Lourdes Domínguez Lino (Netherlands) Richèl Hogenkamp (France) Mathilde Johansson (France) Virginie Razzano
15 Jul	Collector Swedish Open; Båstad, Sweden; WTA International; Clay (red) – $235,000 – 32S/16D; Singles – Doubles	(Spain) Anabel Medina Garrigues (Czech Republic) Klára Zakopalová; 6–1, 6–4	(Romania) Alexandra Dulgheru (Italy) Flavia Pennetta	(Czech Republic) Klára Zakopalová (Italy) Flavia Pennetta	(Spain) Lourdes Domínguez Lino (Netherlands) Richèl Hogenkamp (France) Mathilde Johansson (France) Virginie Razzano
22 Jul	Bank of the West Classic; Stanford, United States; WTA Premier; Hard – $795,707 – 28S/16D; Singles – Doubles	(Slovakia) Dominika Cibulková; 3–6, 6–4, 6–4	(Poland) Agnieszka Radwańska	(United States) Jamie Hampton (Romania) Sorana Cîrstea	(United States) Varvara Lepchenko (Russia) Vera Dushevina (Poland) Urszula Radwańska (Belarus) Olga Govortsova
22 Jul	Bank of the West Classic; Stanford, United States; WTA Premier; Hard – $795,707 – 28S/16D; Singles – Doubles	(United States) Raquel Kops-Jones (United States) Abigail Spears; 6–2, 7–6^{(7–4)}	(Germany) Julia Görges (Croatia) Darija Jurak	(United States) Jamie Hampton (Romania) Sorana Cîrstea	(United States) Varvara Lepchenko (Russia) Vera Dushevina (Poland) Urszula Radwańska (Belarus) Olga Govortsova
22 Jul	Baku Cup; Baku, Azerbaijan; WTA International; Hard – $235,000 – 32S/16D; Singles – Doubles	(Ukraine) Elina Svitolina; 6–4, 6–4	(Israel) Shahar Pe'er	(Poland) Magda Linette (Romania) Alexandra Cadanțu	(Tunisia) Ons Jabeur (Slovenia) Tadeja Majerič (Kazakhstan) Galina Voskoboeva (Croatia) Donna Vekić
22 Jul	Baku Cup; Baku, Azerbaijan; WTA International; Hard – $235,000 – 32S/16D; Singles – Doubles	(Ukraine) Irina Buryachok (Georgia (country)) Oksana Kalashnikova; 4–6, 7–6^{(7–3)}, [10–4]	(Greece) Eleni Daniilidou (Serbia) Aleksandra Krunić	(Poland) Magda Linette (Romania) Alexandra Cadanțu	(Tunisia) Ons Jabeur (Slovenia) Tadeja Majerič (Kazakhstan) Galina Voskoboeva (Croatia) Donna Vekić
29 Jul	Southern California Open; Carlsbad, United States; WTA Premier; Hard – $795,707 – 28S/16D; Singles – Doubles	(Australia) Samantha Stosur; 6–2, 6–3	(Belarus) Victoria Azarenka	(Serbia) Ana Ivanovic (France) Virginie Razzano	(Poland) Urszula Radwańska (Italy) Roberta Vinci (Czech Republic) Petra Kvitová (Poland) Agnieszka Radwańska
29 Jul	Southern California Open; Carlsbad, United States; WTA Premier; Hard – $795,707 – 28S/16D; Singles – Doubles	(United States) Raquel Kops-Jones (United States) Abigail Spears; 6–4, 6–1	(Chinese Taipei) Chan Hao-ching (Slovakia) Janette Husárová	(Serbia) Ana Ivanovic (France) Virginie Razzano	(Poland) Urszula Radwańska (Italy) Roberta Vinci (Czech Republic) Petra Kvitová (Poland) Agnieszka Radwańska
29 Jul	Citi Open; Washington, D.C., United States; WTA International; Hard – $235,000 – 32S/16D; Singles – Doubles	(Slovakia) Magdaléna Rybáriková; 6–4, 7–6^{(7–2)}	(Germany) Andrea Petkovic	(Russia) Ekaterina Makarova (France) Alizé Cornet	(Germany) Angelique Kerber (Romania) Monica Niculescu (Romania) Sorana Cîrstea (Argentina) Paula Ormaechea
29 Jul	Citi Open; Washington, D.C., United States; WTA International; Hard – $235,000 – 32S/16D; Singles – Doubles	(Japan) Shuko Aoyama (Russia) Vera Dushevina; 6–3, 6–3	(Canada) Eugenie Bouchard (United States) Taylor Townsend	(Russia) Ekaterina Makarova (France) Alizé Cornet	(Germany) Angelique Kerber (Romania) Monica Niculescu (Romania) Sorana Cîrstea (Argentina) Paula Ormaechea

=== August ===
Week	Tournament	Champions	Runners-up	Semifinalists	Quarterfinalists
5 Aug	Rogers Cup; Toronto, Canada; WTA Premier 5 Hard – $2,369,000 – 56S/64Q/28D; Singles – Doubles	(United States) Serena Williams; 6–2, 6–0	(Romania) Sorana Cîrstea	(Poland) Agnieszka Radwańska (China) Li Na	(Slovakia) Magdaléna Rybáriková (Italy) Sara Errani (Slovakia) Dominika Cibulková (Czech Republic) Petra Kvitová
5 Aug	Rogers Cup; Toronto, Canada; WTA Premier 5 Hard – $2,369,000 – 56S/64Q/28D; Singles – Doubles	(Serbia) Jelena Janković (Slovenia) Katarina Srebotnik; 5–7, 6–2, [10–6]	(Germany) Anna-Lena Grönefeld (Czech Republic) Květa Peschke	(Poland) Agnieszka Radwańska (China) Li Na	(Slovakia) Magdaléna Rybáriková (Italy) Sara Errani (Slovakia) Dominika Cibulková (Czech Republic) Petra Kvitová
12 Aug	Western & Southern Open; Mason, United States; WTA Premier 5 Hard – $2,369,000 – 56S/28D; Singles – Doubles	(Belarus) Victoria Azarenka; 2–6, 6–2, 7–6^{(8–6)}	(United States) Serena Williams	(China) Li Na (Serbia) Jelena Janković	(Romania) Simona Halep (Poland) Agnieszka Radwańska (Italy) Roberta Vinci (Denmark) Caroline Wozniacki
12 Aug	Western & Southern Open; Mason, United States; WTA Premier 5 Hard – $2,369,000 – 56S/28D; Singles – Doubles	(Chinese Taipei) Hsieh Su-wei (China) Peng Shuai; 2–6, 6–3, [12–10]	(Germany) Anna-Lena Grönefeld (Czech Republic) Květa Peschke	(China) Li Na (Serbia) Jelena Janković	(Romania) Simona Halep (Poland) Agnieszka Radwańska (Italy) Roberta Vinci (Denmark) Caroline Wozniacki
19 Aug	New Haven Open at Yale; New Haven, United States; WTA Premier; Hard – $750,000 – 30S/16D; Singles – Doubles	(Romania) Simona Halep; 6–2, 6–2	(Czech Republic) Petra Kvitová	(Denmark) Caroline Wozniacki (Czech Republic) Klára Zakopalová	(Russia) Ekaterina Makarova (United States) Sloane Stephens (Russia) Anastasia Pavlyuchenkova (Russia) Elena Vesnina
19 Aug	New Haven Open at Yale; New Haven, United States; WTA Premier; Hard – $750,000 – 30S/16D; Singles – Doubles	(India) Sania Mirza (China) Zheng Jie; 6–3, 6–4	(Spain) Anabel Medina Garrigues (Slovenia) Katarina Srebotnik	(Denmark) Caroline Wozniacki (Czech Republic) Klára Zakopalová	(Russia) Ekaterina Makarova (United States) Sloane Stephens (Russia) Anastasia Pavlyuchenkova (Russia) Elena Vesnina
26 Aug; 2 Sep	US Open; New York City, United States; Grand Slam; Hard – $16,102,000 – 128S/128Q/64D/32X; Singles – Doubles – Mixed doubles	(United States) Serena Williams; 7–5, 6–7^{(6–8)}, 6–1	(Belarus) Victoria Azarenka	(China) Li Na (Italy) Flavia Pennetta	(Spain) Carla Suárez Navarro (Russia) Ekaterina Makarova (Italy) Roberta Vinci (Slovakia) Daniela Hantuchová
26 Aug; 2 Sep	US Open; New York City, United States; Grand Slam; Hard – $16,102,000 – 128S/128Q/64D/32X; Singles – Doubles – Mixed doubles	(Czech Republic) Andrea Hlaváčková (Czech Republic) Lucie Hradecká; 6–7^{(4–7)}, 6–1, 6–4	(Australia) Ashleigh Barty (Australia) Casey Dellacqua	(China) Li Na (Italy) Flavia Pennetta	(Spain) Carla Suárez Navarro (Russia) Ekaterina Makarova (Italy) Roberta Vinci (Slovakia) Daniela Hantuchová
26 Aug; 2 Sep	US Open; New York City, United States; Grand Slam; Hard – $16,102,000 – 128S/128Q/64D/32X; Singles – Doubles – Mixed doubles	(Czech Republic) Andrea Hlaváčková (Belarus) Max Mirnyi; 7–6^{(7–5)}, 6–3	(United States) Abigail Spears (Mexico) Santiago González	(China) Li Na (Italy) Flavia Pennetta	(Spain) Carla Suárez Navarro (Russia) Ekaterina Makarova (Italy) Roberta Vinci (Slovakia) Daniela Hantuchová

=== September ===
Week	Tournament	Champions	Runners-up	Semifinalists	Quarterfinalists
9 Sep	Tashkent Open; Tashkent, Uzbekistan; WTA International; Hard – $235,000 – 32S/16D; Singles – Doubles	(Serbia) Bojana Jovanovski; 4–6, 7–5, 7–6^{(7–3)}	(Belarus) Olga Govortsova	(Spain) María Teresa Torró Flor (Luxembourg) Mandy Minella	(Kazakhstan) Galina Voskoboeva (Austria) Yvonne Meusburger (Romania) Alexandra Cadanțu (Italy) Nastassja Burnett
9 Sep	Tashkent Open; Tashkent, Uzbekistan; WTA International; Hard – $235,000 – 32S/16D; Singles – Doubles	(Hungary) Tímea Babos (Kazakhstan) Yaroslava Shvedova; 6–3, 6–3	(Belarus) Olga Govortsova (Luxembourg) Mandy Minella	(Spain) María Teresa Torró Flor (Luxembourg) Mandy Minella	(Kazakhstan) Galina Voskoboeva (Austria) Yvonne Meusburger (Romania) Alexandra Cadanțu (Italy) Nastassja Burnett
9 Sep	Bell Challenge; Quebec City, Canada; WTA International; Carpet (i) – $235,000 – 32S/16D; Singles – Doubles	(Czech Republic) Lucie Šafářová; 6–4, 6–3	(New Zealand) Marina Erakovic	(United States) Christina McHale (Canada) Eugenie Bouchard	(Slovenia) Polona Hercog (Croatia) Ajla Tomljanović (United States) Lauren Davis (France) Kristina Mladenovic
9 Sep	Bell Challenge; Quebec City, Canada; WTA International; Carpet (i) – $235,000 – 32S/16D; Singles – Doubles	(Russia) Alla Kudryavtseva (Australia) Anastasia Rodionova; 6–4, 6–3	(Czech Republic) Andrea Hlaváčková (Czech Republic) Lucie Hradecká	(United States) Christina McHale (Canada) Eugenie Bouchard	(Slovenia) Polona Hercog (Croatia) Ajla Tomljanović (United States) Lauren Davis (France) Kristina Mladenovic
16 Sep	KDB Korea Open; Seoul, South Korea; WTA International; Hard – $500,000 – 32S/16D; Singles – Doubles	(Poland) Agnieszka Radwańska; 6–7^{(6–8)}, 6–3, 6–4	(Russia) Anastasia Pavlyuchenkova	(Spain) Lara Arruabarrena (Italy) Francesca Schiavone	(Russia) Vera Dushevina (South Korea) Jang Su-jeong (Romania) Irina-Camelia Begu (Japan) Kimiko Date-Krumm
16 Sep	KDB Korea Open; Seoul, South Korea; WTA International; Hard – $500,000 – 32S/16D; Singles – Doubles	(Chinese Taipei) Chan Chin-wei (China) Xu Yifan; 7–5, 6–3	(United States) Raquel Kops-Jones (United States) Abigail Spears	(Spain) Lara Arruabarrena (Italy) Francesca Schiavone	(Russia) Vera Dushevina (South Korea) Jang Su-jeong (Romania) Irina-Camelia Begu (Japan) Kimiko Date-Krumm
16 Sep	Guangzhou International Women's Open; Guangzhou, China; WTA International; Hard – $500,000 – 32S/16D; Singles – Doubles	(China) Zhang Shuai; 7–6^{(7–1)}, 6–1	(United States) Vania King	(China) Zheng Jie (Austria) Yvonne Meusburger	(Puerto Rico) Monica Puig (United Kingdom) Laura Robson (United Kingdom) Johanna Konta (France) Alizé Cornet
16 Sep	Guangzhou International Women's Open; Guangzhou, China; WTA International; Hard – $500,000 – 32S/16D; Singles – Doubles	(Chinese Taipei) Hsieh Su-wei (China) Peng Shuai; 6–3, 4–6, [12–10]	(United States) Vania King (Kazakhstan) Galina Voskoboeva	(China) Zheng Jie (Austria) Yvonne Meusburger	(Puerto Rico) Monica Puig (United Kingdom) Laura Robson (United Kingdom) Johanna Konta (France) Alizé Cornet
23 Sep	Toray Pan Pacific Open; Tokyo, Japan; WTA Premier 5 Hard – $2,369,000 – 56S/16D; Singles – Doubles	(Czech Republic) Petra Kvitová; 6–2, 0–6, 6–3	(Germany) Angelique Kerber	(United States) Venus Williams (Denmark) Caroline Wozniacki	(Canada) Eugenie Bouchard (Russia) Svetlana Kuznetsova (Czech Republic) Lucie Šafářová (Poland) Agnieszka Radwańska
23 Sep	Toray Pan Pacific Open; Tokyo, Japan; WTA Premier 5 Hard – $2,369,000 – 56S/16D; Singles – Doubles	(Zimbabwe) Cara Black (India) Sania Mirza; 4–6, 6–0, [11–9]	(Chinese Taipei) Chan Hao-ching (United States) Liezel Huber	(United States) Venus Williams (Denmark) Caroline Wozniacki	(Canada) Eugenie Bouchard (Russia) Svetlana Kuznetsova (Czech Republic) Lucie Šafářová (Poland) Agnieszka Radwańska
30 Sep	China Open; Beijing, China; WTA Premier Mandatory; Hard – $5,185,625 – 60S/28D; Singles – Doubles	(United States) Serena Williams; 6–2, 6–2	(Serbia) Jelena Janković	(Poland) Agnieszka Radwańska (Czech Republic) Petra Kvitová	(Denmark) Caroline Wozniacki (Germany) Angelique Kerber (China) Li Na (Czech Republic) Lucie Šafářová
30 Sep	China Open; Beijing, China; WTA Premier Mandatory; Hard – $5,185,625 – 60S/28D; Singles – Doubles	(Zimbabwe) Cara Black (India) Sania Mirza; 6–2, 6–2	(Russia) Vera Dushevina (Spain) Arantxa Parra Santonja	(Poland) Agnieszka Radwańska (Czech Republic) Petra Kvitová	(Denmark) Caroline Wozniacki (Germany) Angelique Kerber (China) Li Na (Czech Republic) Lucie Šafářová

=== October ===
Week	Tournament	Champions	Runners-up	Semifinalists	Quarterfinalists
7 Oct	Generali Ladies Linz; Linz, Austria; WTA International; Hard (i) – $235,000 – 32S/16D; Singles – Doubles	(Germany) Angelique Kerber; 6–4, 7–6^{(8–6)}	(Serbia) Ana Ivanovic	(Switzerland) Stefanie Vögele (Spain) Carla Suárez Navarro	(United States) Sloane Stephens (Slovakia) Dominika Cibulková (Belgium) Kirsten Flipkens (Austria) Patricia Mayr-Achleitner
7 Oct	Generali Ladies Linz; Linz, Austria; WTA International; Hard (i) – $235,000 – 32S/16D; Singles – Doubles	(Czech Republic) Karolína Plíšková (Czech Republic) Kristýna Plíšková; 7–6^{(8–6)}, 6–4	(Canada) Gabriela Dabrowski (Poland) Alicja Rosolska	(Switzerland) Stefanie Vögele (Spain) Carla Suárez Navarro	(United States) Sloane Stephens (Slovakia) Dominika Cibulková (Belgium) Kirsten Flipkens (Austria) Patricia Mayr-Achleitner
7 Oct	HP Open; Osaka, Japan; WTA International; Hard – $235,000 – 32S/16D; Singles – Doubles	(Australia) Samantha Stosur; 3–6, 7–5, 6–2	(Canada) Eugenie Bouchard	(United States) Madison Keys (Japan) Kurumi Nara	(China) Zheng Jie (Japan) Misaki Doi (Czech Republic) Barbora Záhlavová-Strýcová (Slovenia) Polona Hercog
7 Oct	HP Open; Osaka, Japan; WTA International; Hard – $235,000 – 32S/16D; Singles – Doubles	(France) Kristina Mladenovic (Italy) Flavia Pennetta; 6–4, 6–3	(Australia) Samantha Stosur (China) Zhang Shuai	(United States) Madison Keys (Japan) Kurumi Nara	(China) Zheng Jie (Japan) Misaki Doi (Czech Republic) Barbora Záhlavová-Strýcová (Slovenia) Polona Hercog
Oct 14	Kremlin Cup; Moscow, Russia; WTA Premier; Hard (i) – $795,000 – 28S/16D; Singles – Doubles	(Romania) Simona Halep; 7–6^{(7–1)}, 6–2	(Australia) Samantha Stosur	(Russia) Anastasia Pavlyuchenkova (Russia) Svetlana Kuznetsova	(Slovakia) Daniela Hantuchová (Russia) Alisa Kleybanova (Serbia) Ana Ivanovic (Italy) Roberta Vinci
Oct 14	Kremlin Cup; Moscow, Russia; WTA Premier; Hard (i) – $795,000 – 28S/16D; Singles – Doubles	(Russia) Svetlana Kuznetsova (Australia) Samantha Stosur; 6–1, 1–6, [10–8]	(Russia) Alla Kudryavtseva (Australia) Anastasia Rodionova	(Russia) Anastasia Pavlyuchenkova (Russia) Svetlana Kuznetsova	(Slovakia) Daniela Hantuchová (Russia) Alisa Kleybanova (Serbia) Ana Ivanovic (Italy) Roberta Vinci
Oct 14	BGL BNP Paribas Luxembourg Open; Kockelscheuer, Luxembourg; WTA International; Hard (i) – $235,000 – 32S/16D; Singles – Doubles	(Denmark) Caroline Wozniacki; 6–2, 6–2	(Germany) Annika Beck	(Germany) Sabine Lisicki (Switzerland) Stefanie Vögele	(Serbia) Bojana Jovanovski (Italy) Karin Knapp (Poland) Katarzyna Piter (United States) Sloane Stephens
Oct 14	BGL BNP Paribas Luxembourg Open; Kockelscheuer, Luxembourg; WTA International; Hard (i) – $235,000 – 32S/16D; Singles – Doubles	(Liechtenstein) Stephanie Vogt (Belgium) Yanina Wickmayer; 7–6^{(7–2)}, 6–4	(Germany) Kristina Barrois (France) Laura Thorpe	(Germany) Sabine Lisicki (Switzerland) Stefanie Vögele	(Serbia) Bojana Jovanovski (Italy) Karin Knapp (Poland) Katarzyna Piter (United States) Sloane Stephens
21 Oct	WTA Championships; Istanbul, Turkey; Year-end championships Hard (i) – $6,000,000 – 8S (RR)/4D; Singles – Doubles	(United States) Serena Williams; 2–6, 6–3, 6–0	(China) Li Na	(Serbia) Jelena Janković (Czech Republic) Petra Kvitová	Round robin losers (Poland) Agnieszka Radwańska (Germany) Angelique Kerber (Belarus) Victoria Azarenka (Italy) Sara Errani
21 Oct	WTA Championships; Istanbul, Turkey; Year-end championships Hard (i) – $6,000,000 – 8S (RR)/4D; Singles – Doubles	(Chinese Taipei) Hsieh Su-wei (China) Peng Shuai; 6–4, 7–5	(Russia) Ekaterina Makarova (Russia) Elena Vesnina	(Serbia) Jelena Janković (Czech Republic) Petra Kvitová	Round robin losers (Poland) Agnieszka Radwańska (Germany) Angelique Kerber (Belarus) Victoria Azarenka (Italy) Sara Errani
28 Oct	WTA Tournament of Champions; Sofia, Bulgaria; Year-end championships Hard (i) – $750,000 – 8S; Singles	(Romania) Simona Halep; 2–6, 6–2, 6–2	(Australia) Samantha Stosur	(Serbia) Ana Ivanovic (Russia) Anastasia Pavlyuchenkova	Round robin losers (Ukraine) Elina Svitolina (France) Alizé Cornet (Russia) Elena Vesnina (Bulgaria) Tsvetana Pironkova (Russia) Maria Kirilenko (withdrew)
28 Oct	Fed Cup by BNP Paribas Final; Cagliari, Italy – Clay (red)	Italy; 4–0	Russia		

== Statistical information ==
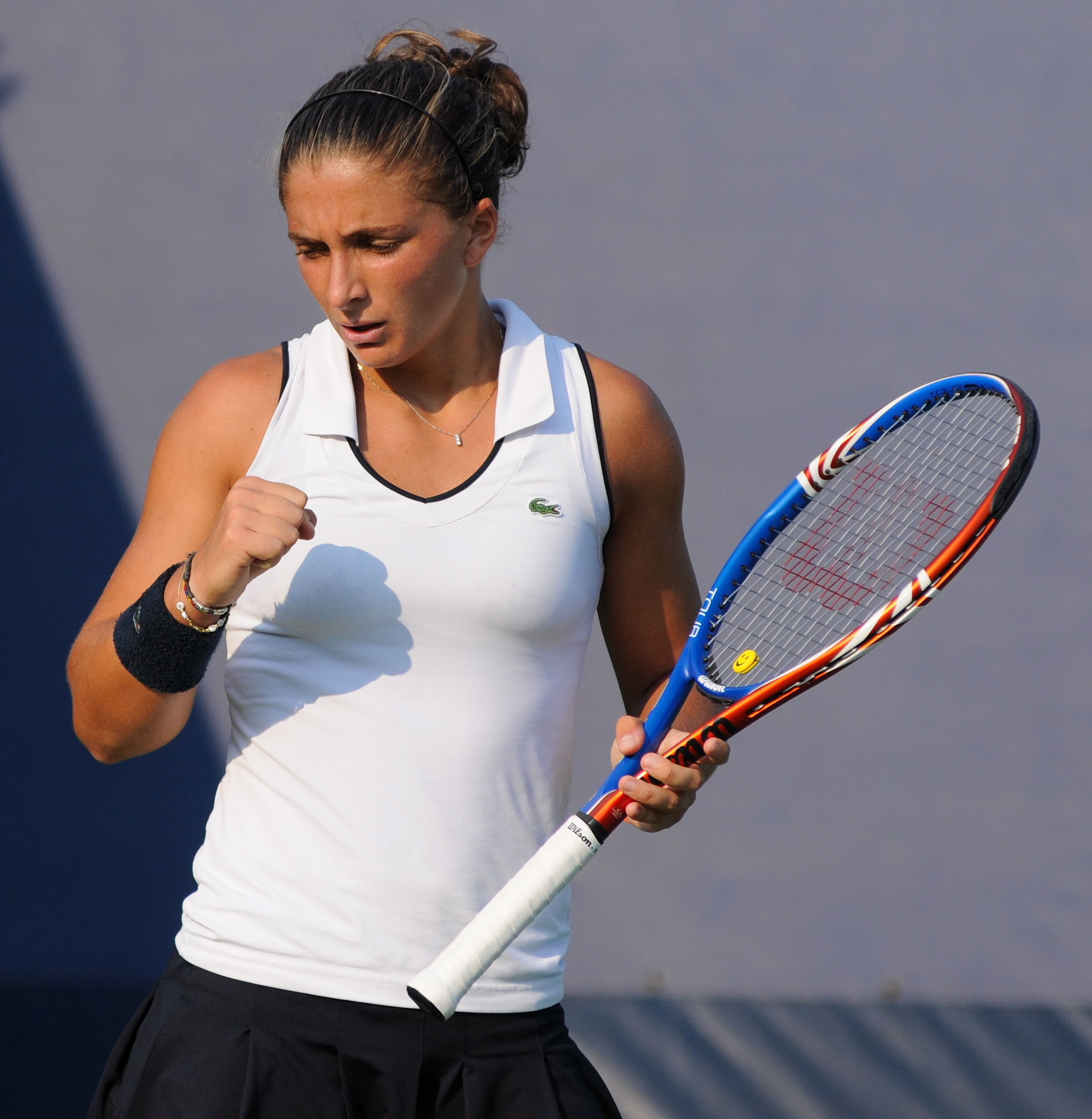
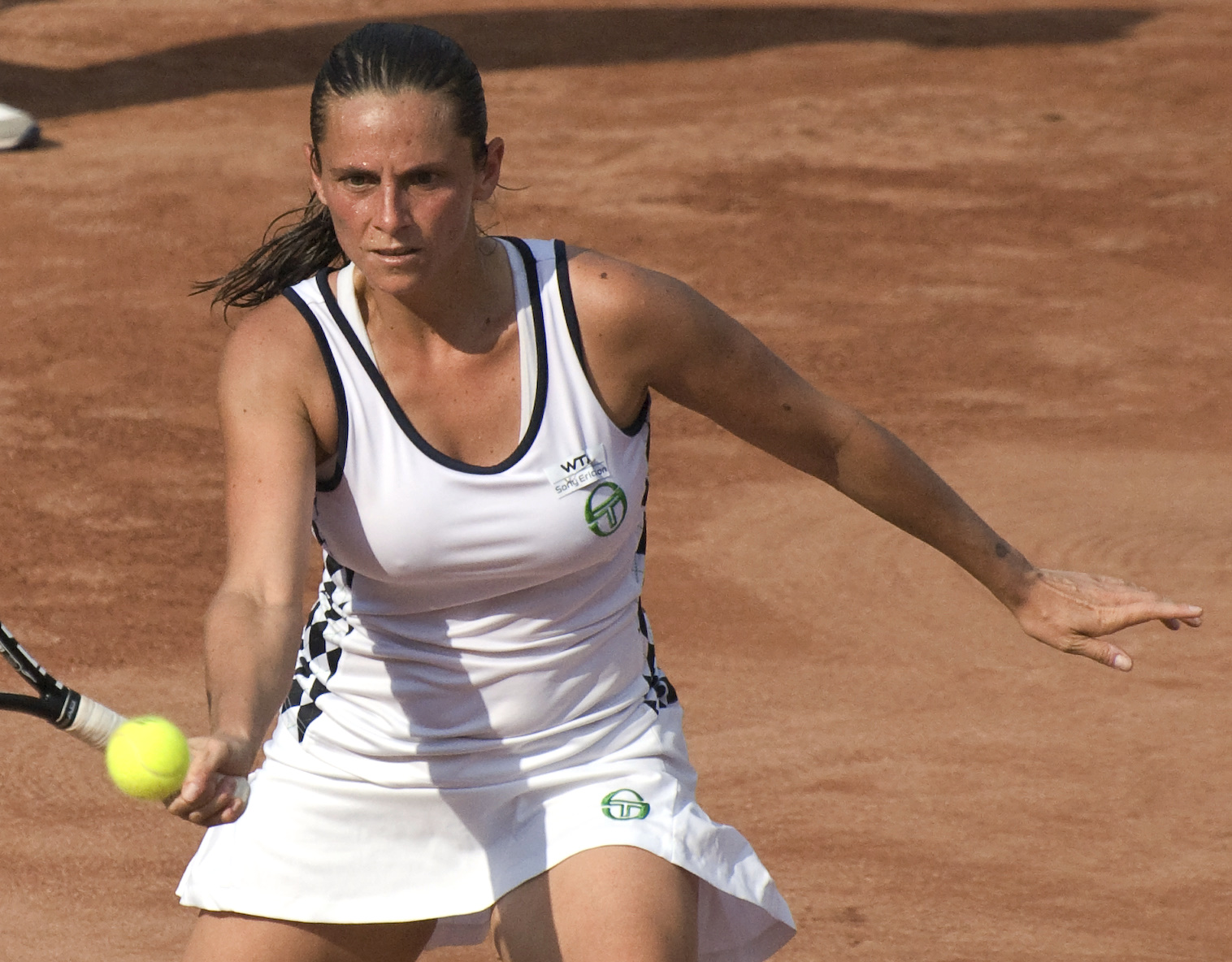
World No. 1 doubles team of Sara Errani (left) and Roberta Vinci (right), winner of eight titles in 2012, dominated the doubles field in early 2013, picking up three titles in two months, including a third Grand Slam trophy at the Australian Open (def. Barty/Dellacqua).

These tables present the number of singles (S), doubles (D), and mixed doubles (X) titles won by each player and each nation during the season, within all the tournament categories of the 2013 WTA Tour: the Grand Slam tournaments, the year-end championships (the WTA Tour Championships and the Tournament of Champions), the WTA Premier tournaments (Premier Mandatory, Premier 5, and regular Premier), and the WTA International tournaments. The players/nations are sorted by: 1) total number of titles (a doubles title won by two players representing the same nation counts as only one win for the nation); 2) cumulated importance of those titles (one Grand Slam win equalling two Premier Mandatory/Premier 5 wins, one year-end championships win equalling one-and-a-half Premier Mandatory/Premier 5 win, one Premier Mandatory/Premier 5 win equalling two Premier wins, one Premier win equalling two International wins); 3) a singles > doubles > mixed doubles hierarchy; 4) alphabetical order (by family names for players).

=== Key ===
Grand Slam tournaments
Year-end championships
WTA Premier Mandatory
WTA Premier 5
WTA Premier
WTA International

=== Titles won by player ===
Total	Player	Grand Slam			Year-end		Premier Mandatory		Premier 5		Premier		International		Total		
Total	Player	S	D	X	S	D	S	D	S	D	S	D	S	D	S	D	X
11	Serena Williams (USA)	● ●			●		● ● ●		● ●		● ●		●		11	0	0
6	Simona Halep (ROU)				●						● ●		● ● ●		6	0	0
6	Kristina Mladenovic (FRA)			●								●		● ● ● ●	0	5	1
5	Peng Shuai (CHN)		●			●				● ●				●	0	5	0
5	Hsieh Su-wei (TPE)		●			●				● ●				●	0	5	0
5	Roberta Vinci (ITA)		●							●		●	● ●		2	3	0
5	Sania Mirza (IND)							●		●		● ● ●			0	5	0
4	Elena Vesnina (RUS)		●					●			●		●		2	2	0
4	Sara Errani (ITA)		●							●		●	●		1	3	0
4	Katarina Srebotnik (SLO)							●		●		● ●			0	4	0
4	Tímea Babos (HUN)													● ● ● ●	0	4	0
3	Victoria Azarenka (BLR)	●							● ●						3	0	0
3	Andrea Hlaváčková (CZE)		●	●										●	0	2	1
3	Lucie Hradecká (CZE)		●	●										●	0	2	1
3	Cara Black (ZIM)							●		●				●	0	3	0
3	Nadia Petrova (RUS)							●				● ●			0	3	0
3	Lucie Šafářová (CZE)							●				●	●		1	2	0
3	Anastasia Pavlyuchenkova (RUS)							●					● ●		2	1	0
3	Samantha Stosur (AUS)										●	●	●		2	1	0
3	Agnieszka Radwańska (POL)										●		● ●		3	0	0
3	Kimiko Date-Krumm (JPN)													● ● ●	0	3	0
3	Anabel Medina Garrigues (ESP)													● ● ●	0	3	0
2	Ekaterina Makarova (RUS)		●					●							0	2	0
2	Maria Sharapova (RUS)						●				●				2	0	0
2	Petra Kvitová (CZE)								●		●				2	0	0
2	Jelena Janković (SRB)									●			●		1	1	0
2	Mona Barthel (GER)										●	●			1	1	0
2	Raquel Kops-Jones (USA)											● ●			0	2	0
2	Bethanie Mattek-Sands (USA)											● ●			0	2	0
2	Abigail Spears (USA)											● ●			0	2	0
2	Karolína Plíšková (CZE)												●	●	1	1	0
2	Shuko Aoyama (JPN)													● ●	0	2	0
2	Chan Hao-ching (TPE)													● ●	0	2	0
2	Casey Dellacqua (AUS)													● ●	0	2	0
2	Lourdes Domínguez Lino (ESP)													● ●	0	2	0
2	Mandy Minella (LUX)													● ●	0	2	0
2	Anastasia Rodionova (AUS)													● ●	0	2	0
2	Yaroslava Shvedova (KAZ)													● ●	0	2	0
1	Marion Bartoli (FRA)	●													1	0	0
1	Jarmila Gajdošová (AUS)			●											0	0	1
1	Dominika Cibulková (SVK)										●				1	0	0
1	Kaia Kanepi (EST)										●				1	0	0
1	Anna-Lena Grönefeld (GER)											●			0	1	0
1	Zheng Jie (CHN)											●			0	1	0
1	Svetlana Kuznetsova (RUS)											●			0	1	0
1	Sabine Lisicki (GER)											●			0	1	0
1	Květa Peschke (CZE)											●			0	1	0
1	Alizé Cornet (FRA)												●		1	0	0
1	Marina Erakovic (NZL)												●		1	0	0
1	Daniela Hantuchová (SVK)												●		1	0	0
1	Bojana Jovanovski (SRB)												●		1	0	0
1	Angelique Kerber (GER)												●		1	0	0
1	Maria Kirilenko (RUS)												●		1	0	0
1	Yvonne Meusburger (AUT)												●		1	0	0
1	Li Na (CHN)												●		1	0	0
1	Monica Niculescu (ROU)												●		1	0	0
1	Magdaléna Rybáriková (SVK)												●		1	0	0
1	Francesca Schiavone (ITA)												●		1	0	0
1	Elina Svitolina (UKR)												●		1	0	0
1	Caroline Wozniacki (DEN)												●		1	0	0
1	Zhang Shuai (CHN)												●		1	0	0
1	Lara Arruabarrena (ESP)													●	0	1	0
1	Ashleigh Barty (AUS)													●	0	1	0
1	Irina-Camelia Begu (ROU)													●	0	1	0
1	Irina Buryachok (UKR)													●	0	1	0
1	Chan Chin-wei (TPE)													●	0	1	0
1	Chan Yung-jan (TPE)													●	0	1	0
1	Chang Kai-chen (TPE)													●	0	1	0
1	Vera Dushevina (RUS)													●	0	1	0
1	Oksana Kalashnikova (GEO)													●	0	1	0
1	Sandra Klemenschits (AUT)													●	0	1	0
1	Andreja Klepač (SLO)													●	0	1	0
1	Alla Kudryavtseva (RUS)													●	0	1	0
1	Garbiñe Muguruza (ESP)													●	0	1	0
1	Raluca Olaru (ROU)													●	0	1	0
1	Arantxa Parra Santonja (ESP)													●	0	1	0
1	Flavia Pennetta (ITA)													●	0	1	0
1	Katarzyna Piter (POL)													●	0	1	0
1	Kristýna Plíšková (CZE)													●	0	1	0
1	Chanelle Scheepers (RSA)													●	0	1	0
1	Valeria Solovyeva (RUS)													●	0	1	0
1	María Teresa Torró Flor (ESP)													●	0	1	0
1	Stephanie Vogt (LIE)													●	0	1	0
1	Galina Voskoboeva (KAZ)													●	0	1	0
1	Yanina Wickmayer (BEL)													●	0	1	0
1	Xu Yifan (CHN)													●	0	1	0
1	Klára Zakopalová (CZE)													●	0	1	0

=== Titles won by nation ===
Total	Nation	Grand Slam			Year-end		Premier Mandatory		Premier 5		Premier		International		Total		
Total	Nation	S	D	X	S	D	S	D	S	D	S	D	S	D	S	D	X
17	Russia (RUS)		1				1	3			2	3	4	3	7	10	0
15	United States (USA)	2			1		3		2		2	4	1		11	4	0
13	Czech Republic (CZE)		1	2				1	1		1	2	2	3	4	7	2
9	Romania (ROU)				1						2		4	2	7	2	0
9	China (CHN)		1			1				2		1	2	2	2	7	0
9	Chinese Taipei (TPE)		1			1				2				5	0	9	0
8	France (FRA)	1		1								1	1	4	2	5	1
8	Italy (ITA)		1							1		1	4	1	4	4	0
8	Australia (AUS)			1							1	1	1	4	2	5	1
6	Spain (ESP)													6	0	6	0
5	India (IND)							1		1		3			0	5	0
5	Slovenia (SLO)							1		1		2		1	0	5	0
5	Japan (JPN)													5	0	5	0
4	Germany (GER)										1	2	1		2	2	0
4	Poland (POL)										1		2	1	3	1	0
4	Hungary (HUN)													4	0	4	0
3	Zimbabwe (ZIM)							1		1				1	0	3	0
3	Belarus (BLR)	1							2						3	0	0
3	Serbia (SRB)									1			2		2	1	0
3	Slovakia (SVK)										1		2		3	0	0
3	Kazakhstan (KAZ)													3	0	3	0
2	Austria (AUT)												1	1	1	1	0
2	Ukraine (UKR)												1	1	1	1	0
2	Luxembourg (LUX)													2	0	2	0
1	Estonia (EST)										1				1	0	0
1	New Zealand (NZL)												1		1	0	0
1	Denmark (DEN)												1		1	0	0
1	Belgium (BEL)													1	0	1	0
1	Georgia (GEO)													1	0	1	0
1	Liechtenstein (LIE)													1	0	1	0
1	South Africa (RSA)													1	0	1	0

=== Titles information ===
The following players won their first main circuit title in singles, doubles, or mixed doubles:

Singles

- (New Zealand) Marina Erakovic – Memphis (draw)
- (Romania) Simona Halep – Nürnberg (draw)
- (Austria) Yvonne Meusburger – Bad Gastein (draw)
- (Romania) Monica Niculescu – Florianópolis (draw)
- (Ukraine) Elina Svitolina – Baku (draw)
- (Czech Republic) Karolína Plíšková – Kuala Lumpur (draw)
- (Russia) Elena Vesnina – Hobart (draw)
- (China) Zhang Shuai - Guangzhou (draw)

Doubles

- (Spain) Lara Arruabarrena – Katowice (draw)
- (Germany) Mona Barthel – Stuttgart (draw)
- (Australia) Ashleigh Barty – Birmingham (draw)
- (Chinese Taipei) Chan Chin-wei – Seoul (draw)
- (Australia) Casey Dellacqua – Pattaya (draw)
- (Chinese Taipei) Chan Hao-ching – Shenzhen (draw)
- (Georgia (country)) Oksana Kalashnikova – Baku (draw)
- (Austria) Sandra Klemenschits – Bad Gastein (draw)
- (Slovenia) Andreja Klepač – Bad Gastein (draw)
- (Luxembourg) Mandy Minella – Bogotá (draw)
- (Spain) Garbiñe Muguruza – Hobart (draw)
- (Poland) Katarzyna Piter – Palermo (draw)
- (Czech Republic) Karolína Plíšková – Linz (draw)
- (Czech Republic) Kristýna Plíšková – Linz (draw)
- (Spain) María Teresa Torró Flor – Hobart (draw)
- (Liechtenstein) Stephanie Vogt – Luxembourg (draw)
- (Belgium) Yanina Wickmayer – Luxembourg (draw)
- (China) Xu Yifan – Seoul (draw)

Mixed doubles

- (Australia) Jarmila Gajdošová – Australian Open (draw)
- (Czech Republic) Andrea Hlaváčková – US Open (draw)
- (Czech Republic) Lucie Hradecká – French Open (draw)
- (France) Kristina Mladenovic – Wimbledon (draw)

The following players defended a main circuit title in singles, doubles, or mixed doubles:

Singles

- (Belarus) Victoria Azarenka – Australian Open (draw), Doha (draw)
- (Italy) Sara Errani – Acapulco (draw)
- (Slovakia) Magdaléna Rybáriková – Washington, D.C. (draw)
- (Russia) Maria Sharapova – Stuttgart (draw)
- (United States) Serena Williams – Charleston (draw), Madrid (draw), US Open (draw), 2013 WTA Tour Championships (draw)

Doubles

- (Japan) Shuko Aoyama – Washington (draw)
- (Ukraine) Irina Buryachok – Baku (draw)
- (Chinese Taipei) Chang Kai-chen – Kuala Lumpur (draw)
- (United States) Raquel Kops-Jones – Carlsbad (draw)
- (Russia) Nadia Petrova – Miami (draw)
- (Czech Republic) Lucie Šafářová – Charleston (draw)
- (United States) Abigail Spears – Carlsbad (draw)
- (Slovenia) Katarina Srebotnik – Sydney (draw)

== Rankings ==
The Race to the Championships determines the players in the WTA Tour Championships in October. The WTA rankings are based on tournaments of the latest 52 weeks.

=== Singles ===
The following is the 2013 top 20 ranked players in the world and top 20 in the Race to the Championships. Players must include points from the Grand Slams, Premier Mandatory tournaments and the WTA Championships. For Top 20 players, their best two results at Premier 5 tournaments will also count. Gold backgrounds indicate players that qualified for the WTA Tour Championships. Blue backgrounds indicate players that qualified as alternates at the WTA Tour Championships.

Race Singles (as of October 21, 2013)
Rk	Player	Points	Tour
1	Serena Williams (USA)	12,040	16(14)
2	Victoria Azarenka (BLR)	7,676	15(13)
3	Maria Sharapova (RUS)	5,891	13(11)
4	Agnieszka Radwańska (POL)	5,890	20
5	Li Na (CHN)	5,120	17(14)
6	Petra Kvitová (CZE)	4,370	22
7	Sara Errani (ITA)	4,190	21
8	Jelena Janković (SRB)	3,860	19
9	Angelique Kerber (GER)	3,715	21
10	Caroline Wozniacki (DEN)	3,300	22
11	Sloane Stephens (USA)	3,185	20
12	Marion Bartoli (FRA)	3,173	17(16)
13	Roberta Vinci (ITA)	3,170	24
14	Sabine Lisicki (GER)	2,830	18
15	Simona Halep (ROU)	2,685	22
16	Carla Suárez Navarro (ESP)	2,665	24
17	Maria Kirilenko (RUS)	2,640	17
18	Ana Ivanovic (SRB)	2,476	19
19	Kirsten Flipkens (BEL)	2,455	21(20)
20	Sorana Cîrstea (ROU)	2,170	25

WTA Singles Year-End Rankings
#	Player	Points	#Trn	'12 Rk	High	Low	'12→'13
1	Serena Williams (USA)	13,260	17	3	1	3	▲2
2	Victoria Azarenka (BLR)	8,046	16	1	1	3	▼1
3	Li Na (CHN)	6,045	18	7	3	6	▲4
4	Maria Sharapova (RUS)	5,891	15	2	2	4	▼2
5	Agnieszka Radwańska (POL)	5,875	21	4	4	5	▼1
6	Petra Kvitová (CZE)	4,775	23	8	6	11	▲2
7	Sara Errani (ITA)	4,435	22	6	5	8	▼1
8	Jelena Janković (SRB)	4,170	20	22	8	26	▲14
9	Angelique Kerber (GER)	3,965	23	5	5	10	▼4
10	Caroline Wozniacki (DEN)	3,520	23	10	8	11	=
11	Simona Halep (ROU)	3,335	24	47	11	65	▲36
12	Sloane Stephens (USA)	3,185	22	38	11	38	▲26
13	Marion Bartoli (FRA)	3,172	18	11	7	15	▼2
14	Roberta Vinci (ITA)	3,170	25	16	11	17	▲2
15	Sabine Lisicki (GER)	2,920	20	37	14	52	▲22
16	Ana Ivanovic (SRB)	2,850	22	13	12	17	▼3
17	Carla Suárez Navarro (ESP)	2,735	26	34	14	34	▲17
18	Samantha Stosur (AUS)	2,675	24	9	9	20	▼9
19	Maria Kirilenko (RUS)	2,640	19	14	10	20	▼5
20	Kirsten Flipkens (BEL)	2,495	23	54	13	54	▲34

==== Number 1 ranking ====
Holder	Date gained	Date forfeited
Victoria Azarenka (BLR)	Year-End 2012	17 February 2013
Serena Williams (USA)	18 February 2013	Year-End 2013

=== Doubles ===
The following is 2013 season's top 20 doubles players ranked individually, followed by a list of the top 10 doubles pair in the Race to the Championships. Gold backgrounds indicate teams that have qualified for WTA Tour Championships.

WTA Championships Race (Doubles)
Rk	Team	Points	Tour
1	Sara Errani (ITA); Roberta Vinci (ITA)	7,415	14
2	Peng Shuai (CHN); Hsieh Su-wei (TPE)	6,245	13
3	Nadia Petrova (RUS); Katarina Srebotnik (SLO)	6,155	10
4	Ekaterina Makarova (RUS); Elena Vesnina (RUS)	5,971	14
5	Ashleigh Barty (AUS); Casey Dellacqua (AUS)	4,621	6
6	Andrea Hlaváčková (CZE); Lucie Hradecká (CZE)	4,408	12
7	Anna-Lena Grönefeld (GER); Květa Peschke (CZE)	4,390	19
8	Lucie Šafářová (CZE); Anastasia Pavlyuchenkova (RUS)	3,050	14
9	Raquel Kops-Jones (USA); Abigail Spears (USA)	2,990	26
10	Anastasia Rodionova (AUS); Alla Kudryavtseva (RUS)	2,285	12

WTA Doubles Year-End Rankings
#	Player	Points	Change
1	Sara Errani (ITA)	8,080	+1
1	Roberta Vinci (ITA)	8,080	=
3	Hsieh Su-wei (TPE)	7,815	+22
4	Peng Shuai (CHN)	7,815	+52
5	Elena Vesnina (RUS)	7,220	+4
6	Katarina Srebotnik (SLO)	7,145	+10
7	Ekaterina Makarova (RUS)	7,021	+4
8	Nadia Petrova (RUS)	6,565	-3
9	Sania Mirza (IND)	5,565	+3
10	Casey Dellacqua (AUS)	5,456	+57
11	Andrea Hlaváčková (CZE)	5,330	-8
12	Ashleigh Barty (AUS)	5,095	+160
13	Cara Black (ZIM)	4,740	+611
14	Lucie Hradecká (CZE)	4,730	-10
15	Anna-Lena Grönefeld (GER)	4,390	+3
16	Květa Peschke (CZE)	4,390	+1
17	Zheng Jie (CHN)	3,680	+2
18	Lucie Šafářová (CZE)	3,620	+41
19	Kristina Mladenovic (FRA)	3,430	+9
20	Jelena Janković (SRB)	3,300	+284

==== Number 1 ranking ====
Holder	Date gained	Date forfeited
Roberta Vinci (ITA)	Year-End 2012	Held Through The Entirety of 2013
Roberta Vinci (ITA); Sara Errani (ITA)	29 April 2013	Year-End 2013

== Prize money leaders ==
#	Player	Singles	Doubles	Mixed	Bonus Pool	Year-to-date
1	Serena Williams (USA)	$11,995,654	$89,918	$0	$300,000	$12,385,572
2	Victoria Azarenka (BLR)	$6,097,165	$0	$0	$400,000	$6,497,165
3	Li Na (CHN)	$3,982,485	$0	$0	$0	$3,982,485
4	Maria Sharapova (RUS)	$3,544,222	$0	$0	$0	$3,544,222
6	Agnieszka Radwańska (POL)	$2,593,332	$0	$0	$525,000	$3,118,332
7	Sara Errani (ITA)	$1,958,890	$665,102	$0	$450,000	$3,073,992
5	Marion Bartoli (FRA)	$2,889,097	$0	$1,035	$0	$2,890,132
8	Petra Kvitová (CZE)	$2,531,403	$22,071	$0	$300,000	$2,853,474
9	Angelique Kerber (GER)	$1,660,150	$29,208	$0	$450,000	$2,139,358
10	Jelena Janković (SRB)	$1,831,399	$194,491	$4,459	$0	$2,030,349
prize money given in US$; as of October 28, 2013

== Statistics leaders ==
as of November 4, 2013

Aces
	Player	Aces	Matches
1	(United States) Serena Williams	480	80
2	(Germany) Sabine Lisicki	297	52
3	(Czech Republic) Petra Kvitová	250	70
4	(United States) Madison Keys	225	41
5	(Serbia) Ana Ivanovic	222	61
6	(France) Kristina Mladenovic	207	46
7	(Italy) Roberta Vinci	204	69
8	(Belgium) Kirsten Flipkens	203	55
9	(Czech Republic) Karolína Plíšková	191	27
10	(Germany) Julia Görges	186	40

Service games won
	Player	%	Matches
1	(United States) Serena Williams	84.1	80
2	(Russia) Maria Sharapova	78.5	44
3	(China) Zhang Shuai	75.1	25
4	(United States) Madison Keys	74.2	41
5	(Germany) Sabine Lisicki	73.7	52
6	(Australia) Samantha Stosur	73.0	61
7	(Poland) Agnieszka Radwańska	72.6	77
8	(Czech Republic) Karolína Plíšková	72.3	27
9	(Russia) Maria Kirilenko	71.8	52
10	(Estonia) Kaia Kanepi	71.7	31

Break points saved
	Player	%	Matches
1	(United States) Serena Williams	64.8	80
2	(Russia) Maria Sharapova	62.8	44
3	(Estonia) Kaia Kanepi	62.1	31
4	(Czech Republic) Petra Kvitová	61.4	70
5	(United States) Madison Keys	60.6	41
6	(Czech Republic) Karolína Plíšková	60.5	27
7	(China) Li Na	60.0	58
8	(Australia) Samantha Stosur	59.7	61
9	(Germany) Andrea Petkovic	59.2	32
10	(Croatia) Petra Martić	59.1	22

First-serve percentage
	Player	%	Matches
1	(Italy) Sara Errani	82.8	67
2	(Romania) Monica Niculescu	75.9	43
3	(China) Zheng Jie	70.7	36
4	(Japan) Kimiko Date-Krumm	69.6	28
5	(Denmark) Caroline Wozniacki	69.4	61
6	(Germany) Annika Beck	69.4	44
7	(Austria) Yvonne Meusburger	69.1	27
8	(Spain) Carla Suárez Navarro	68.6	67
9	(Romania) Simona Halep	67.7	67
10	(Sweden) Sofia Arvidsson	67.3	24

First-service points won
	Player	%	Matches
1	(United States) Serena Williams	74.7	80
2	(Czech Republic) Karolína Plíšková	71.9	29
3	(Russia) Maria Sharapova	71.5	44
4	(New Zealand) Marina Erakovic	70.9	36
5	(Germany) Sabine Lisicki	70.7	52
6	(United States) Madison Keys	69.4	41
7	(Estonia) Kaia Kanepi	69.2	31
8	(United Kingdom) Laura Robson	68.9	40
9	(France) Kristina Mladenovic	68.4	46
10	(United States) Bethanie Mattek-Sands	67.9	31

Second-serve points won
	Player	%	Matches
1	(China) Zhang Shuai	52.5	25
2	(United States) Serena Williams	51.2	80
3	(Croatia) Donna Vekić	50.7	24
4	(Poland) Agnieszka Radwańska	49.9	75
5	(Puerto Rico) Monica Puig	49.7	28
6	(Russia) Maria Kirilenko	49.7	52
7	(Denmark) Caroline Wozniacki	48.6	61
8	(Germany) Angelique Kerber	48.6	66
9	(United States) Bethanie Mattek-Sands	47.7	31
10	(Japan) Misaki Doi	47.5	30

Points won returning 1st service
	Player	%	Matches
1	(Austria) Yvonne Meusburger	46.1	27
2	(United States) Serena Williams	44.7	80
3	(Romania) Simona Halep	43.8	67
4	(Israel) Shahar Pe'er	43.7	30
5	(Belarus) Victoria Azarenka	43.3	52
6	(China) Zhang Shuai	43.0	25
7	(Romania) Monica Niculescu	42.8	43
8	(China) Li Na	42.3	58
9	(Italy) Sara Errani	42.2	67
10	(Russia) Maria Sharapova	42.1	44

Break points converted
	Player	%	Matches
1	(China) Zhang Shuai	56.1	25
2	(Romania) Simona Halep	55.4	67
3	(United States) Serena Williams	54.1	80
4	(China) Li Na	53.0	58
5	(Ukraine) Lesia Tsurenko	52.2	30
6	(Japan) Kimiko Date-Krumm	51.7	28
7	(Poland) Urszula Radwańska	51.4	44
8	(Romania) Monica Niculescu	51.4	43
9	(Germany) Andrea Petkovic	50.8	32
10	(Spain) Lara Arruabarrena	50.6	24

Return games won
	Player	%	Matches
1	(Belarus) Victoria Azarenka	54.8	51
2	(United States) Serena Williams	53.9	80
3	(Romania) Simona Halep	50.8	67
4	(Italy) Sara Errani	50.4	67
5	(Austria) Yvonne Meusburger	50.2	27
6	(China) Zhang Shuai	49.3	25
7	(China) Li Na	47.1	58
8	(Czech Republic) Klára Zakopalová	46.2	52
9	(Russia) Maria Sharapova	46.1	44
10	(Romania) Monica Niculescu	45.2	43

== Points distribution ==
Category	W	F	SF	QF	R16	R32	R64	R128	Q	Q3	Q2	Q1
Grand Slam (S)	2000	1400	900	500	280	160	100	5	60	50	40	2
Grand Slam (D)	2000	1400	900	500	280	160	5	–	48	–	–	–
WTA Championships (S)	+450	+360	(230 for each win, 70 for each loss)									
WTA Championships (D)	1500	1050	690									
WTA Premier Mandatory (96S)	1000	700	450	250	140	80	50	5	30	–	20	1
WTA Premier Mandatory (64S)	1000	700	450	250	140	80	5	–	30	–	20	1
WTA Premier Mandatory (28/32D)	1000	700	450	250	140	5	–	–	–	–	–	–
WTA Premier 5 (56S)	900	620	395	225	125	70	1	–	30	–	20	1
WTA Premier 5 (28D)	900	620	395	225	125	1	–	–	–	–	–	–
WTA Premier (56S)	470	320	200	120	60	40	1	–	12	–	8	1
WTA Premier (32S)	470	320	200	120	60	1	–	–	20	12	8	1
WTA Premier (16D)	470	320	200	120	1	–	–	–	–	–	–	–
WTA Tournament of Champions (8)	+195	+75	(60 for each win, 25 for each loss)									
WTA International (56S)	280	200	130	70	30	15	1	–	10	–	6	1
WTA International (32S)	280	200	130	70	30	1	–	–	16	10	6	1
WTA International (16D)	280	200	130	70	1	–	–	–	–	–	–	–

== Retirements ==
Following is a list of notable players (winners of a main tour title, and/or part of the WTA rankings top 100 (singles) or (doubles) for at least one week) who announced their retirement from professional tennis, became inactive (after not playing for more than 52 weeks), or were permanently banned from playing, during the 2013 season:

- Elena Baltacha (born 14 August 1983 in Kyiv, Soviet Union) turned professional in 1997, reaching a career high ranking of world #49 in September 2010. Throughout her career, Baltacha frequently ranked as the British #1, most recently in 2012, and competed at the London Olympic Games in 2012, where she reached the second round in singles and the first round in doubles with Anne Keothavong. Baltacha won no titles on the WTA Tour (singles or doubles) but won 11 singles and 4 doubles titles on the ITF tour, including two $100,000 tournaments in Midland, USA and Nottingham, United Kingdom. Baltacha reached the third round of a Grand Slam tournament on three occasions, at the Australian Open in 2005 and 2010, and at Wimbledon in 2002. She also scored two wins over top ten players – Francesca Schiavone and Li Na, both in 2010. Baltacha announced her retirement in November 2013 after the completion of her 2013 season (she did subsequently die from cancer in May of the following year).
- Marion Bartoli (born 2 October 1984 in Le Puy-en-Velay, France) turned professional in February 2000 and was a consistent presence in and around the top twenty for most of her career, peaking at world #7 in January 2012. Bartoli was a two time participant at the Year End Championships (in 2007 and 2011) and won eight WTA singles titles during her career, with her final title being her most prestigious, at Wimbledon in 2013, where she defeated Sabine Lisicki to claim her only grand slam singles title. In addition, Bartoli reached the final of the 2007 Wimbledon Championships where she lost to Venus Williams, and also reached the quarter-finals or better at each of the other three majors. In addition to her singles success, Bartoli won three WTA doubles titles and reached a career high doubles ranking of #14 in 2004. Bartoli announced her retirement in August 2013 after losing to Simona Halep in the 2013 Western & Southern Open. She was ranked at a career-best matching world #7 at the time. Her retirement came just six weeks after she had claimed her Wimbledon title and was considered a big surprise as Bartoli had committed to several tournaments on the US Open Series swing and had previously shown no signs of wanting to leave the game.
- Yayuk Basuki (born 30 November 1970, in Yogyakarta, Indonesia), turned professional in 1990 career high ranking of 19 in singles and 9 in doubles. Her best singles performance at a Grand Slam event came at Wimbledon in 1997, where she reached the quarter-finals. Her best result in doubles competition at a Grand Slam event was in the 1993 US Open, where she and partner Nana Miyagi reached the semifinals. In the mixed doubles, Basuki reached the quarterfinals at the French Open in 1995 with Kenny Thorne as her partner. In 1997, she reached the same stage at Wimbledon, this time paired with Tom Nijssen. Her retirement in 2013 at the age of 42.
- Séverine Beltrame (born 14 August 1979 in Montpellier, France), sometimes known as Séverine Brémond, Beltrame turned professional in 2002, reaching a career high singles ranking of number 34 in February 2007. Beltrame won no titles on the WTA tour, but as a qualifier, reached the quarterfinals at Wimbledon in 2006, as well as the fourth round at the US Open in 2008. Beltrame was also known as a member of the notorious "Generation 1979" along with other French players including Amélie Mauresmo, Nathalie Dechy and Émilie Loit, and at the age of 33, was the last of the group to announce her retirement, playing her final match at the 2013 French Open, where she lost in the qualifying rounds.
- Anna Chakvetadze (born 5 March 1987 in Moscow, Russia) turned professional in 2003 and retired in September 2013 after lengthy health and injury problems. Chakvetadze won eight titles on the WTA tour during her career, including the Tier I Kremlin Cup in 2006. Other career highlights include reaching the semifinals of the 2007 US Open, which allowed to her achieve her career high ranking of world #5 immediately after the tournament. In addition, she reached the quarterfinals at the 2007 Australian Open and the 2007 French Open, results which helped her to qualify for the 2007 WTA Tour Championships in Madrid, where she qualified for the semifinals, before losing to Maria Sharapova. Chakvetadze's results began to decline following 2007, after she was the victim of an armed robbery, though she remained a steady presence in the top 50. Chakvetadze fell out of the top 100 in 2011 after suffering numerous injuries and a recurring condition that saw her faint on court numerous times. She attempted a comeback throughout 2012 but was again set back by injuries, and eventually announced her retirement on September 11, 2013.
- Jill Craybas (born 4 July 1974 in Providence, United States) turned professional in 1996. Enjoying a lengthy career, Craybas reached career high rankings of 39 in singles and 41 in doubles. Craybas competed at 45 consecutive grand slam main draws in singles between 2000 and 2011, with her best performance being at Wimbledon in 2005, where she upset Marion Bartoli and Serena Williams to make the fourth round. Craybas won one singles title on the WTA Tour at the Japan Open Tennis Championships in 2002, as well as winning five doubles titles. She announced her retirement after the US Open in 2013 at the age of 39.
- (Russia) Galina Fokina (born January 17, 1984, in Moscow, Soviet Union), turned professional in 1999.reaching a career high singles ranking of number 168 in May 2002 and the doubles no. 79 ranking in April 2002. She retired from professional tennis in 2013, aged 29.
- Carly Gullickson (born 26 November 1986 in Cincinnati, United States), turned professional in 2003.Her career-high WTA singles ranking is No. 123, which she reached in July 2009. Her career high doubles ranking is No. 52, set at April 2006. She won the 2009 U.S. Open mixed doubles event, partnering with Travis Parrott.She retired from professional tennis in 2013, aged 27.
- Anne Keothavong (born 16 September 1983 in Hackney, United Kingdom), turned pro in 2001, reaching her career high singles ranking of number 48 in February 2009, as well as a career high doubles rank of 94 in 2011. She is a winner of 20 ITF singles titles and 8 ITF doubles titles, she also reached one WTA doubles final in 2013. Her career best performance at a slam was the third round at the US Open in 2008. She was also a part of Team GB during their home games at London 2012. She also played in the Great Britain Fed Cup team from 2001 to 2013. She announced her retirement on July 24, 2013, aged 29.
- (Slovakia) Zuzana Kučová (born 26 June 1982 in Bratislava, Czechoslovakia), turned pro in 2000. In June 2010, she reached her best singles ranking of world number 101. In December 2009, she peaked at world number 175 in the doubles rankings.2013 French Open. There, she caused a huge upset by defeating 24th seed Julia Görges in straight sets. in the second round lost to Virginie Razzano in three sets. His last professional tournament at 2013 French Open.
- (Belarus) Darya Kustova (born May 29, 1986, in Minsk, Soviet Union), turned pro in 2000. Her highest WTA singles ranking is 117, which she reached in January 2010. Her career high in doubles was 66, set in July 2008. She retired from professional tennis in 2013, aged 27.
- Nuria Llagostera Vives (born 16 May 1980 in Mallorca, Spain), turned pro in 1996, reaching her career high singles ranking of number 35 in June 2005, as well as a career high doubles rank of 5 in 2009. She won 2 WTA singles titles and 16 doubles titles. Her career best performance at a slam was in doubles, reaching for three times the semifinals at the French Open in 2010 and 2012 and at the US Open in 2012. She won also the wta doubles championships final, partnering with María José Martínez Sánchez, defeating in the final Cara Black and Liezel Huber. She also played in the Spain Fed Cup team from 2005 to 2013, with 16 ties played. She announced her retirement on November 20, 2013, aged 33, due to a two-ban year suspension from tennis after testing positive for methamphetamine.
- Sophie Lefèvre (born 23 February 1981 in Toulouse, France), turned pro in 1998. In September 2003, she reached her highest WTA singles ranking of 216. Her highest doubles ranking was 76 reached in February 2011.She retired from professional tennis in 2013, aged 32.
- (United States) Tetiana Luzhanska (born September 4, 1984, in Kyiv, Soviet Union), turned pro in 2006. Her highest WTA singles ranking is 131, which she reached in September 2011. Her career high doubles ranking is 99, set at February 2007. She retired from professional tennis in 2013, aged 29.
- Rebecca Marino (born 16 December 1990 in Toronto, Canada), joined the pro tour in 2008, reaching a career high singles ranking of number 38 in 2011. Marino made one WTA singles final (in Memphis) and won 5 ITF titles. Marino took an initial break from tennis in early 2012 citing personal reasons, returning late in the year. She announced her permanent retirement in February 2013, at the age of 22.
- (Hungary) Katalin Marosi (born 12 November 1979 in Gheorgheni, Romania), turned professional in October 1995, reaching a career high singles ranking of number 101 in May 2000 and the doubles no. 38 ranking in February 2013. Marosi lost all three WTA doubles finals she reached, but won 15 singles titles and 31 doubles titles on the ITF tour. She decided to retire after competing the 2013 WTA Tour.
- (Czech Republic) Zuzana Ondrášková (born 3 May 1980 in Opava, Czechoslovakia), turned professional in 1995, reaching a career high ranking of 74 in February 2004. Ondrášková won no titles on the WTA tour during her career, but won twenty titles on the ITF tour. Ondrášková progressed to the second round of Grand Slam events on four occasions and scored wins over several top players including Dinara Safina, Li Na and Marion Bartoli. Ondrášková announced her retirement from tennis in early 2013, aged 33.
- Marie-Ève Pelletier (born May 18, 1982, in Quebec City, Canada), turned pro in 1998.She reached a career high ranking of 106 in singles in June 2005 and a career high of 54 in doubles in April 2010.She retired from professional tennis in 2013, aged 31.
- Ahsha Rolle (born 21 March 1985 in Miami Shores, United States), turned professional in 2004, reaching a career high singles ranking of number 82 in September 2007 and the doubles no. 111 ranking in October 2011. She entered the 2007 US Open as a wildcard entry. She defeated 17th seeded Tatiana Golovin in the first round and Karin Knapp in the second round. She fell to Dinara Safina in the third round. Due to some injuries, she retired from professional tennis in 2013, aged 28.
- (Latvia) Anastasija Sevastova (born 13 April 1990 in Liepāja, Soviet Union), turned professional in 2006, winning her first match on the WTA tour the following year. Sevastova reached a career high ranking of number 36 in January 2011, immediately following that years Australian Open, where she had achieved her best performance in a Grand Slam event, losing in the fourth round to world number one Caroline Wozniacki. Sevastova won one WTA Tour event in Estoril 2010, becoming the first Latvian woman to win a WTA singles title since 1993. Sevastova also scored two top 10 wins in her career, over Samantha Stosur and Jelena Janković. She announced her retirement in May 2013 at the age of 23, having endured frequent injuries since 2011.
- Melanie South (born 3 May 1986 in Kingston upon Thames, United Kingdom), turned professional in 2004. South reached a career high ranking of number 99 in February 2009 in singles and number 120 in March 2009 in doubles. South won no titles on the WTA tour during her career, but won six titles on the ITF tour. South progressed to the second round of Grand Slam events on one occasion and scored wins over several top players including Francesca Schiavone, Alicia Molik, Sybille Bammer and Petra Kvitová. South announced her retirement from tennis in December 2013, aged 27.
- Ágnes Szávay (born 29 December 1988 in Kiskunhalas, Hungary), joined the pro tour in 2004, reaching a career high singles ranking of number 13 in 2008. Szávay won 5 singles titles on the WTA tour, including the Tier 2 China Open in 2007, and in the same year, made the quarterfinal of the US Open. She also experienced success in doubles, reaching a career high rank of number 22 in 2007, winning two titles, and making it to the semifinal of the 2007 US Open with partner Vladimíra Uhlířová. Despite being named the WTA Newcomer of the Year in 2007, injuries limited Szávay's play beyond 2011, and she was ultimately forced into an early retirement in February 2013 at the age of 24.
- Romana Tedjakusuma (born 24 July 1976, in Jambi, Indonesia), turned professional in 1990, reaching a career high singles ranking of number 82 in April 1994 and the doubles no. 114 ranking in February 1995. She retired from professional tennis in 2013, aged 37.
- Aurélie Védy (born February 8, 1981, in France), turned professional in 1998, reaching a career high singles ranking of number 260. WTA doubles ranking is 85, set in May 2009.She retired from professional tennis in 2013, aged 32.
- Riza Zalameda (born February 10, 1986, in Los Angeles, United States), turned professional in 2002, reaching a career high singles ranking of number 534 July 2006 and the doubles no 76 April 2010. She retired from professional tennis in 2013, aged 27.

== Comebacks ==
Following are notable players that came back after retirements during the 2013 WTA Tour season:

- (Switzerland) Martina Hingis (born September 30, 1980, in Košice, Czechoslovakia), turned professional in 1994. She is a former world No. 1 in singles and doubles, is a 15-time Grand Slam champion (5 in singles, 9 in doubles and 1 in mixed) and holds 43 singles and 37 doubles titles. She returned to the doubles tour to play with Daniela Hantuchová in 2013.

== Awards ==
The winners of the 2013 WTA Awards were announced throughout the last two weeks of November.

- Player of the Year – (United States) Serena Williams
- Doubles Team of the Year – (Italy) Sara Errani & (Italy) Roberta Vinci
- Most Improved Player – (Romania) Simona Halep
- Comeback Player of the Year – (Russia) Alisa Kleybanova
- Newcomer of the Year – (Canada) Eugenie Bouchard
- Diamond Aces – (Belarus) Victoria Azarenka
- Fan Favorite Singles Player – (Poland) Agnieszka Radwańska
- Fan Favorite Doubles Team – (Russia) Ekaterina Makarova & (Russia) Elena Vesnina
- Fan Favorite Twitter – (Russia) Maria Sharapova ()
- Fan Favorite Facebook – (Russia) Maria Sharapova ()
- Fan Favorite Video – 40 LOVE Story Episode 10 ()
- Fan Favorite WTA Live Show – Cincinnati ()
- Fan Favorite Shot of the Year – (Poland) Agnieszka Radwańska (Miami QF) ()
- Fan Favorite Match of the Year – (Russia) Maria Sharapova Vs (Belarus) Victoria Azarenka (French Open SF) ()

== See also ==
- 2013 WTA Awards
- 2013 ATP World Tour
- 2013 ATP Challenger Tour
- 2013 WTA 125K series
- 2013 ITF Women's Circuit
- 2013 ITF Men's Circuit
- Association of Tennis Professionals
- International Tennis Federation

== Notes ==
- ^{a} After a flood in Hungary caused devastation in Budapest, the organizers decided to hold the tournament anyway, but cancelled the qualification draw (the first four top alternatives entering in the main draw automatically) and reducing the doubles draw from 16 teams to 8.
