= 2013 New Haven Open at Yale =

- Date: August 16–24
- Edition: 45th
- Category: WTA Premier
- Surface: Hard / outdoor
- Location: New Haven, Connecticut, United States
- Venue: Cullman-Heyman Tennis Center

Champions

Singles
- (Romania) Simona Halep

Doubles
- (India) Sania Mirza / (China) Zheng Jie
← 2012 ·	New Haven Open at Yale	· 2014 →

The 2013 New Haven Open at Yale was a women's tennis tournament played on outdoor hard courts. It was the 45th edition of the New Haven Open at Yale, and part of the Premier Series of the 2013 WTA Tour. It took place at the Cullman-Heyman Tennis Center in New Haven, Connecticut, United States, from August 16 through August 24. It was the last event on the 2013 US Open Series before the 2013 US Open.

== Singles main-draw entrants ==
=== Seeds ===
Country	Player	Ranking*	Seed
ITA	Sara Errani	6	1
GER	Angelique Kerber	8	2
CZE	Petra Kvitová	9	3
DEN	Caroline Wozniacki	10	4
ITA	Roberta Vinci	12	5
USA	Sloane Stephens	17	6
GER	Sabine Lisicki	18	7
SVK	Dominika Cibulková	19	8

- Rankings are as of August 12, 2013

=== Other entrants ===
The following players received wildcards into the singles main draw:

- (Germany) Julia Görges
- (Slovakia) Daniela Hantuchová
- (United States) Sloane Stephens

The following players received entry from the qualifying draw:

- (Italy) Karin Knapp
- (Japan) Ayumi Morita
- (Puerto Rico) Monica Puig
- (United States) Alison Riske
- (Slovakia) Anna Karolína Schmiedlová
- (Switzerland) Stefanie Vögele

The following players received entry from a lucky loser spot:

- (Ukraine) Elina Svitolina
- (Germany) Annika Beck

=== Withdrawals ===
Before the tournament

- (France) Marion Bartoli (retirement from tennis)
- (Slovakia) Magdaléna Rybáriková (lower-back injury)
- (Poland) Urszula Radwańska (viral illness)

=== Retirements ===
- (Romania) Sorana Cîrstea (abdominal injury)
- (Japan) Ayumi Morita (low-back injury)
- (China) Peng Shuai (dizziness)

== Doubles main-draw entrants ==
=== Seeds ===
Country	Player	Country	Player	Rank*	Seed
TPE	Hsieh Su-wei	CHN	Peng Shuai	19	1
ESP	Anabel Medina Garrigues	SLO	Katarina Srebotnik	31	2
IND	Sania Mirza	CHN	Zheng Jie	39	3
USA	Liezel Huber	ESP	Nuria Llagostera Vives	39	4

- Rankings are as of August 12, 2013

=== Other entrants ===
The following pair received a wildcard into the doubles main draw:

- (Slovakia) Daniela Hantuchová / (Switzerland) Martina Hingis

== Finals ==
=== Singles ===
(Romania) Simona Halep defeated (Czech Republic) Petra Kvitová, 6–2, 6–2.

=== Doubles ===
(India) Sania Mirza / (China) Zheng Jie defeated (Spain) Anabel Medina Garrigues / (Slovenia) Katarina Srebotnik, 6–3, 6–4
