= 2013 WTA Awards =

Details

Achievements (singles)

Awards
- Player of the year: (United States) Serena Williams
- Most improved player of the year: (Romania) Simona Halep
- Newcomer of the year: (Canada) Eugenie Bouchard
- Comeback player of the year: (Russia) Alisa Kleybanova

The 2013 WTA Awards are a series of awards given by the Women's Tennis Association to players who have achieved something remarkable during the 2013 WTA Tour.

== The awards ==
These awards are decided by either the media, the players, the association, or the fans. Nominees were announced by the WTA's Twitter account.

Note: award winners in bold

=== Player of the Year ===
- (United States) **Serena Williams**

=== Doubles Team of the Year ===
- (Italy) **Sara Errani** & (Italy) **Roberta Vinci**
- (Chinese Taipei) Su-Wei Hsieh & (China) Peng Shuai
- (Australia) Ashleigh Barty & (Australia) Casey Dellacqua

=== Most Improved Player of the Year ===
- **(Romania) Simona Halep**
- (United States) Sloane Stephens
- (Spain) Carla Suárez Navarro

=== Newcomer of the Year ===
- **(Canada) Eugenie Bouchard**
- (Puerto Rico) Monica Puig
- (United States) Madison Keys

=== Comeback Player of the Year ===
- **(Russia) Alisa Kleybanova**
- (Germany) Andrea Petkovic
- (Italy) Flavia Pennetta

=== Diamond Aces ===
- **(Belarus) Victoria Azarenka**

=== Fan Favourite Singles Player ===
- (Poland) **Agnieszka Radwańska**
- (China) Li Na
- (United States) Serena Williams
- (Russia) Maria Sharapova
- (Belarus) Victoria Azarenka

=== Fan Favourite Doubles Team ===
- (Russia) **Ekaterina Makarova & (Russia) Elena Vesnina**
- (Chinese Taipei) Su-Wei Hsieh & (China) Peng Shuai
- (Australia) Ashleigh Barty & (Australia) Casey Dellacqua
- (Italy) Sara Errani & (Italy) Roberta Vinci

=== Fan Favourite Player on Twitter ===
- (Russia) **Maria Sharapova**
- (United States) Serena Williams
- (Belarus) Victoria Azarenka
- (Denmark) Caroline Wozniacki

=== Fan Favourite Player on Facebook ===
- (Russia) **Maria Sharapova**
- (Czech Republic) Petra Kvitová
- (Serbia) Ana Ivanovic
- (Belarus) Victoria Azarenka

=== Fan Favourite WTA Video of the Year ===
- **WTA 40 LOVE Story presented by Xerox | Episode 10: 2013 – 40th Anniversary of the WTA**()
- Pre-Wimbledon Party
- Dubai Duty Free Travel Show | Caroline Wozniacki
- 2013 TEB BNP Paribas WTA Championships – Istanbul Draw Ceremony

=== Fan Favourite WTA Live Show of the Year ===
- **Western & Southern Open**()
- WTA 40 LOVE Event
- Pre-Wimbledon Party
- Sony Open Tennis
- Southern California Open

=== WTA Shot of the Year ===
- **(Poland) Agnieszka Radwańska (quarterfinals of 2013 Sony Open Tennis against (Belgium) Kirsten Flipkens)**()
- (Belarus) Victoria Azarenka (final of 2013 Western & Southern Open against (United States) Serena Williams)
- (Russia) Maria Sharapova (final of 2013 Sony Open Tennis against (United States) Serena Williams)
- (Denmark) Caroline Wozniacki (first round of 2013 Qatar Total Open against (Bosnia and Herzegovina) Mervana Jugić-Salkić)
- (United States) Serena Williams (round robin at 2013 WTA Tour Championships against (Germany) Angelique Kerber)

=== WTA Match of the Year ===
- **(Russia) Maria Sharapova vs (Belarus) Victoria Azarenka (semifinals of 2013 French Open)**()
- (United States) Serena Williams vs (Czech Republic) Petra Kvitová (quarterfinals of 2013 Qatar Total Open)
- (Belarus) Victoria Azarenka vs (China) Li Na (final of 2013 Australian Open)
- (Germany) Sabine Lisicki vs (United States) Serena Williams (Fourth round of 2013 Wimbledon Championships)
- (United States) Serena Williams vs (Russia) Maria Sharapova (final of 2013 French Open)
