= 2013 New Haven Open at Yale – Doubles =

Doubles
- 2013 New Haven Open at Yale

Final
- Champions: (India) Sania Mirza (China) Zheng Jie
- Runners-up: (Spain) Anabel Medina Garrigues (Slovenia) Katarina Srebotnik
- Score: 6–3, 6–4

Events
Singles	Doubles
← 2012 ·	New Haven Open at Yale	· 2014 →

Liezel Huber and Lisa Raymond were the defending champions, but decided not to defend their title together. Huber partnered up with Nuria Llagostera Vives, while Raymond played alongside Flavia Pennetta. Huber and Llagostera Vives defeated Pennetta and Raymond in the first round, but lost to Anabel Medina Garrigues and Katarina Srebotnik in the semifinals.
Sania Mirza and Zheng Jie won the title, defeating Medina Garrigues and Srebotnik in the final, 6–3, 6–4.

== Seeds ==
1. (Chinese Taipei) Hsieh Su-wei / (China) Peng Shuai (first round)
2. (Spain) Anabel Medina Garrigues / (Slovenia) Katarina Srebotnik (final)
3. (India) Sania Mirza / (China) Zheng Jie (champions)
4. (United States) Liezel Huber / (Spain) Nuria Llagostera Vives (semifinals)

== Draw ==
=== Key ===
- Q = Qualifier
- WC = Wild card
- LL = Lucky loser
- Alt = Alternate
- SE = Special exempt
- PR = Protected ranking
- ITF = ITF entry
- JE = Junior exempt
- w/o = Walkover
- r = Retired
- d = Defaulted
- SR = Special ranking

=== Draw ===
First round
1	(Chinese Taipei) S-w Hsieh (China) S Peng	4	3
(Spain) S Soler Espinosa (Spain) C Suárez Navarro	6	6
(Japan) S Aoyama (Slovenia) A Klepač	6	6
(Romania) I-C Begu (Belarus) O Govortsova	3	4
3	(India) S Mirza (China) J Zheng	6	3	[10]
(Georgia (country)) O Kalashnikova (Poland) A Rosolska	3	6	[8]
(Hungary) K Marosi (United States) M Moulton-Levy	7^{8}	6
(Romania) A Dulgheru (Kazakhstan) Y Shvedova	6^{6}	3
WC	(Slovakia) D Hantuchová (Switzerland) M Hingis	3	1
(Zimbabwe) C Black (United States) V King	6	6
(Italy) F Pennetta (United States) L Raymond	4	5
4	(United States) L Huber (Spain) N Llagostera Vives	6	7
(Chinese Taipei) H-c Chan (Slovakia) J Husárová	2	2
(Czech Republic) K Zakopalová (Czech Republic) L Hradecká	6	6
(South Africa) N Grandin (Croatia) D Jurak	3	6	[5]
2	(Spain) A Medina Garrigues (Slovenia) K Srebotnik	6	2	[10]

Quarterfinals
(Spain) S Soler Espinosa (Spain) C Suárez Navarro	7^{7}	7^{7}
(Japan) S Aoyama (Slovenia) A Klepač	6^{4}	6^{0}
3	(India) S Mirza (China) J Zheng	6	3	[10]
(Hungary) K Marosi (United States) M Moulton-Levy	4	6	[8]
(Zimbabwe) C Black (United States) V King	6	4	[4]
4	(United States) L Huber (Spain) N Llagostera Vives	4	6	[10]
(Czech Republic) K Zakopalová (Czech Republic) L Hradecká	5	2
2	(Spain) A Medina Garrigues (Slovenia) K Srebotnik	7	6

Semifinals
(Spain) S Soler Espinosa (Spain) C Suárez Navarro	3	3
3	(India) S Mirza (China) J Zheng	6	6
4	(United States) L Huber (Spain) N Llagostera Vives	6	5	[1]
2	(Spain) A Medina Garrigues (Slovenia) K Srebotnik	4	7	[10]

Final
3	(India) S Mirza (China) J Zheng	6	6
2	(Spain) A Medina Garrigues (Slovenia) K Srebotnik	3	4
