= 2013 New Haven Open at Yale – Singles =

Singles
- 2013 New Haven Open at Yale

Final
- Champion: (Romania) Simona Halep
- Runner-up: (Czech Republic) Petra Kvitová
- Score: 6–2, 6–2

Details
- Draw: 30
- Seeds: 8

Events
Singles	Doubles
- New Haven Open at Yale

Petra Kvitová was the defending champion, but she was defeated in the final by Simona Halep 6–2, 6–2.

== Seeds ==
The top two seeds receive a bye into the second round.

1. (Italy) Sara Errani (second round)
2. (Germany) Angelique Kerber (second round)
3. (Czech Republic) Petra Kvitová (final)
4. (Denmark) Caroline Wozniacki (semifinals)
5. (Italy) Roberta Vinci (first round)
6. (United States) Sloane Stephens (quarterfinals)
7. (Germany) Sabine Lisicki (second round)
8. (Slovakia) Dominika Cibulková (first round)

== Draw ==
Key

- Q = Qualifier
- WC = Wild card
- LL = Lucky loser
- Alt = Alternate
- ITF = ITF entry
- PR = Protected ranking
- SR = Special ranking
- SE = Special exempt
- JE = Junior exempt
- JR = Junior Accelerator Programme entrant
- CO = College Accelerator Programme entrant
- NG = Next Gen Accelerator Program entrant
- w/o = Walkover
- r = Retired
- d = Defaulted

=== Finals ===
Semifinals
(Romania) Simona Halep	6	7
4	(Denmark) Caroline Wozniacki	2	5
3	(Czech Republic) Petra Kvitová	6	6
(Czech Republic) Klára Zakopalová	0	1

Final
(Romania) Simona Halep	6	6
3	(Czech Republic) Petra Kvitová	2	2

=== Top half ===
First round
(Russia) E Makarova	6	2	7^{7}
(Canada) A Wozniak	2	6	6^{5}
(Romania) S Halep	6	6
WC	(Slovakia) D Hantuchová	2	1
(Spain) C Suárez Navarro	7	6
5	(Italy) R Vinci	5	3
4	(Denmark) C Wozniacki	2	3
(China) S Peng	6	1^{r}
Q	(Italy) K Knapp	6	6
LL	(Ukraine) E Svitolina	3	4
(Serbia) B Jovanovski	2	6	5
WC	(Germany) J Görges	6	4	7
Q	(Slovakia) AK Schmiedlová	4	4
6/WC	(United States) S Stephens	6	6

Second round
1	(Italy) S Errani	5	1
(Russia) E Makarova	7	6
(Romania) S Halep	3	6	6
(Spain) C Suárez Navarro	6	4	1
4	(Denmark) C Wozniacki	6	7
Q	(Italy) K Knapp	1	5
WC	(Germany) J Görges	5	6	1
6/WC	(United States) S Stephens	7	2	6

Quarterfinals
(Russia) E Makarova	1	6^{6}
(Romania) S Halep	6	7^{8}
4	(Denmark) C Wozniacki	7^{8}	6
6/WC	(United States) S Stephens	6^{6}	2

Semifinals
(Romania) S Halep	6	7
4	(Denmark) C Wozniacki	2	5

=== Bottom half ===
First round
7	(Germany) S Lisicki	7	6
(France) K Mladenovic	5	1
(Russia) A Pavlyuchenkova	3
(Romania) S Cîrstea	0^{r}
Q	(United States) A Riske	7	6
Q	(Switzerland) S Vögele	5	1
LL	(Germany) A Beck	6	3	3
3	(Czech Republic) P Kvitová	4	6	6
8	(Slovakia) D Cibulková	6	3	3
(Czech Republic) K Zakopalová	3	6	6
Q	(Puerto Rico) M Puig	7^{7}	6
(Chinese Taipei) S-w Hsieh	6^{4}	1
(Russia) E Vesnina	2
Q	(Japan) A Morita	0^{r}

Second round
7	(Germany) S Lisicki	5	3
(Russia) A Pavlyuchenkova	7	6
Q	(United States) A Riske	6^{5}	6	3
3	(Czech Republic) P Kvitová	7^{7}	4	6
(Czech Republic) K Zakopalová	6	6
Q	(Puerto Rico) M Puig	4	1
(Russia) E Vesnina	6	6
2	(Germany) A Kerber	2	4

Quarterfinals
(Russia) A Pavlyuchenkova	6	2	5
3	(Czech Republic) P Kvitová	2	6	7
(Czech Republic) K Zakopalová	4	6	6
(Russia) E Vesnina	6	0	4

Semifinals
3	(Czech Republic) P Kvitová	6	6
(Czech Republic) K Zakopalová	0	1

== Qualifying ==
=== Seeds ===
1. (Chinese Taipei) Hsieh Su-wei (moved to main draw)
2. (Romania) Monica Niculescu (first round)
3. (Ukraine) Elina Svitolina (qualifying competition, lucky loser)
4. (Germany) Annika Beck (qualifying competition, lucky loser)
5. (Switzerland) Stefanie Vögele (qualified)
6. (Puerto Rico) Monica Puig (qualified)
7. (Japan) Ayumi Morita (qualified)
8. (Spain) Lourdes Domínguez Lino (first round)
9. (Belgium) Yanina Wickmayer (qualifying competition)
10. (Italy) Karin Knapp (qualified)
11. (Bulgaria) Tsvetana Pironkova (second round)
12. (Sweden) Johanna Larsson (first round)
13. (Spain) Sílvia Soler Espinosa (first round)

=== Qualifiers ===
1. (United States) Alison Riske
2. (Japan) Ayumi Morita
3. (Slovakia) Anna Karolína Schmiedlová
4. (Italy) Karin Knapp
5. (Switzerland) Stefanie Vögele
6. (Puerto Rico) Monica Puig

=== Lucky losers ===
1. (Ukraine) Elina Svitolina
2. (Germany) Annika Beck

=== Qualifying draw ===
==== First qualifier ====
First round
13	(Spain) Sílvia Soler Espinosa	6^{6}	6	2
(Romania) Irina-Camelia Begu	7^{8}	1	6
(Greece) Eleni Daniilidou	6	6^{6}	3
(United States) Alison Riske	4	7^{8}	6
(France) Virginie Razzano	6	4	0^{r}
(Russia) Olga Puchkova	3	6	0
(Brazil) Teliana Pereira	7^{7}	1	4
9	(Belgium) Yanina Wickmayer	6^{3}	6	6

Second round
(Romania) Irina-Camelia Begu	6	6^{2}	2
(United States) Alison Riske	2	7^{7}	6
(Russia) Olga Puchkova	6	1	3
9	(Belgium) Yanina Wickmayer	3	6	6

Qualifying competition
(United States) Alison Riske	6	6
9	(Belgium) Yanina Wickmayer	4	2

==== Second qualifier ====
First round
2	(Romania) Monica Niculescu	4	3^{r}
(Colombia) Mariana Duque-Marino	6	2
(Czech Republic) Andrea Hlaváčková	6	6
WC	(United States) Chieh-Yu Hsu	2	0
(Spain) Anabel Medina Garrigues	6	6
(Spain) María Teresa Torró Flor	2	4
WC	(Czech Republic) Petra Cetkovská	3	7	5
7	(Japan) Ayumi Morita	6	5	7

Second round
(Colombia) Mariana Duque-Marino	7	7
(Czech Republic) Andrea Hlaváčková	5	5
(Spain) Anabel Medina Garrigues	3	2
7	(Japan) Ayumi Morita	6	6

Qualifying competition
(Colombia) Mariana Duque-Marino	2	1
7	(Japan) Ayumi Morita	6	6

==== Third qualifier ====
First round
3	(Ukraine) Elina Svitolina	2	6	6
(Spain) Lara Arruabarrena	6	2	3
(Slovakia) Jana Čepelová	7	3	6
WC	(United States) Lena Litvak	5	6	3
(United Kingdom) Heather Watson	3	1^{r}
(Slovakia) Anna Karolína Schmiedlová	6	2
(China) Zhang Shuai	2	6	6
12	(Sweden) Johanna Larsson	6	3	4

Second round
3	(Ukraine) Elina Svitolina	6	6
(Slovakia) Jana Čepelová	3	3
(Slovakia) Anna Karolína Schmiedlová	6	6
(China) Zhang Shuai	4	3

Qualifying competition
3	(Ukraine) Elina Svitolina	6^{4}	2
(Slovakia) Anna Karolína Schmiedlová	7^{7}	6

==== Fourth qualifier ====
First round
4	(Germany) Annika Beck	7	6
(Czech Republic) Lucie Hradecká	5	3
(Italy) Flavia Pennetta	3	6	6
(Serbia) Vesna Dolonc	6	4	1
(Slovenia) Polona Hercog	1	1^{r}
WC	(United States) Alexandra Mueller	6	3
(Australia) Anastasia Rodionova	2	3
10	(Italy) Karin Knapp	6	6

Second round
4	(Germany) Annika Beck	3	6	0
(Italy) Flavia Pennetta	6	2	0^{r}
WC	(United States) Alexandra Mueller	6	6^{0}	2
10	(Italy) Karin Knapp	3	7^{7}	6

Qualifying competition
4	(Germany) Annika Beck	6^{4}	6	2
10	(Italy) Karin Knapp	7^{7}	4	6

==== Fifth qualifier ====
First round
5	(Switzerland) Stefanie Vögele	2	6	6
WC	(United States) Katerina Stewart	6	2	2
(Argentina) Paula Ormaechea	2	1
(Romania) Alexandra Cadanțu	6	6
(Belarus) Olga Govortsova	6	3	4
(China) Duan Yingying	4	6	6
(Kazakhstan) Yaroslava Shvedova	4	7	6
8	(Spain) Lourdes Domínguez Lino	6	5	1

Second round
5	(Switzerland) Stefanie Vögele	6	6
(Romania) Alexandra Cadanțu	2	0
(China) Duan Yingying	6^{6}	4
(Kazakhstan) Yaroslava Shvedova	7^{8}	6

Qualifying competition
5	(Switzerland) Stefanie Vögele	6	3	2
(Kazakhstan) Yaroslava Shvedova	3	6	1^{r}

==== Sixth qualifier ====
First round
6	(Puerto Rico) Monica Puig	6	6
WC	(United States) Nadia Echeverría Alam	2	2
(Czech Republic) Karolína Plíšková	7	6^{6}	2
(Sweden) Sofia Arvidsson	5	7^{8}	6
(United Kingdom) Elena Baltacha	5	6^{7}
(France) Caroline Garcia	7	7^{9}
(New Zealand) Marina Erakovic	5	3
11	(Bulgaria) Tsvetana Pironkova	7	6

Second round
6	(Puerto Rico) Monica Puig	6	5
(Sweden) Sofia Arvidsson	2	2^{r}
(France) Caroline Garcia	6^{5}	7^{7}	6
11	(Bulgaria) Tsvetana Pironkova	7^{7}	6^{2}	3

Qualifying competition
6	(Puerto Rico) Monica Puig	6	6
(France) Caroline Garcia	2	4
