= 2013 Southern California Open – Doubles =

Doubles
- 2013 Southern California Open

Final
- Champions: (United States) Raquel Kops-Jones (United States) Abigail Spears
- Runners-up: (Chinese Taipei) Chan Hao-ching (Slovakia) Janette Husárová
- Score: 6–4, 6–1

Details
- Draw: 16
- Seeds: 4

Events
| Singles | Doubles |
- Southern California Open

Raquel Kops-Jones and Abigail Spears successfully defended their title, defeating Chan Hao-ching and Janette Husárová in the final, 6–4, 6–1.

== Seeds ==
1. (Germany) Anna-Lena Grönefeld / (Czech Republic) Květa Peschke (quarterfinals)
2. (United States) Liezel Huber / (Spain) Nuria Llagostera Vives (quarterfinals)
3. (United States) Raquel Kops-Jones / (United States) Abigail Spears (champions)
4. (Serbia) Jelena Janković / (Slovenia) Katarina Srebotnik (semifinals)

== Draw ==
Key

- Q = Qualifier
- WC = Wild card
- LL = Lucky loser
- Alt = Alternate
- ITF = ITF entry
- PR = Protected ranking
- SR = Special ranking
- SE = Special exempt
- JE = Junior exempt
- JR = Junior Accelerator Programme entrant
- CO = College Accelerator Programme entrant
- NG = Next Gen Accelerator Program entrant
- w/o = Walkover
- r = Retired
- d = Defaulted

=== Draw ===
First round
1 | (Germany) A-L Grönefeld (Czech Republic) K Peschke | 6 | 6
(Latvia) L Dekmeijere (Ukraine) O Savchuk | 2 | 3
WC | (Czech Republic) P Kvitová (Austria) T Paszek | 3 | 3
(Chinese Taipei) H-c Chan (Slovakia) J Husárová | 6 | 6
4 | (Serbia) J Janković (Slovenia) K Srebotnik | 6 | 6
(United States) A Muhammad (United States) A Will | 2 | 2
(Hungary) K Marosi (United States) M Moulton-Levy | 1 | 2
(India) S Mirza (Italy) F Pennetta | 6 | 6
WC | (Slovakia) D Hantuchová (Switzerland) M Hingis | 6 | 6
(Germany) J Görges (Croatia) D Jurak | 1 | 1
(United States) L Raymond (United Kingdom) L Robson | 4 | 3
3 | (United States) R Kops-Jones (United States) A Spears | 6 | 6
(Zimbabwe) C Black (New Zealand) M Erakovic | 7 | 6
(Slovakia) D Cibulková (United States) V Lepchenko | 5 | 2
(South Africa) N Grandin (Poland) A Rosolska | 7 | 3 | [13]
2 | (United States) L Huber (Spain) N Llagostera Vives | 5 | 6 | [15]

Quarterfinals
1 | (Germany) A-L Grönefeld (Czech Republic) K Peschke | 5 | 7^{7} | [6]
(Chinese Taipei) H-c Chan (Slovakia) J Husárová | 7 | 6^{5} | [10]
4 | (Serbia) J Janković (Slovenia) K Srebotnik | 7^{7} | 6
(India) S Mirza (Italy) F Pennetta | 6^{2} | 4
WC | (Slovakia) D Hantuchová (Switzerland) M Hingis | 6 | 5 | [3]
3 | (United States) R Kops-Jones (United States) A Spears | 4 | 7 | [10]
(Zimbabwe) C Black (New Zealand) M Erakovic | 6 | 3 | [12]
2 | (United States) L Huber (Spain) N Llagostera Vives | 4 | 6 | [10]

Semifinals
(Chinese Taipei) H-c Chan (Slovakia) J Husárová | 6 | 6
4 | (Serbia) J Janković (Slovenia) K Srebotnik | 3 | 2
3 | (United States) R Kops-Jones (United States) A Spears | 7 | 6
(Zimbabwe) C Black (New Zealand) M Erakovic | 5 | 1

Final
(Chinese Taipei) H-c Chan (Slovakia) J Husárová | 4 | 1
3 | (United States) R Kops-Jones (United States) A Spears | 6 | 6
