= 2013 WTA Tour Championships =

- Date: 22–27 October
- Edition: 43rd (singles) / 38th (doubles)
- Draw: 8S / 4D
- Surface: Hard (indoor)
- Location: Istanbul, Turkey
- Venue: Sinan Erdem Dome

Champions

Singles
- (United States) Serena Williams

Doubles
- (Chinese Taipei) Hsieh Su-wei / (China) Peng Shuai
- WTA Tour Championships

The 2013 WTA Tour Championships was a women's tennis tournament at Istanbul, Turkey from 22 to 27 October 2013. It was the 43rd edition of the singles event and the 38th edition of the doubles competition. The tournament, held at the Sinan Erdem Dome, was contested by eight singles players and four doubles teams. It was the larger of two season-ending championships on the 2013 WTA Tour.

== Finals ==
=== Singles ===
(United States) Serena Williams defeated (China) Li Na, 2–6, 6–3, 6–0.

- It was Williams' record eleventh title in 2013, and her fourth year-end championship title.

=== Doubles ===
(Chinese Taipei) Hsieh Su-wei / (China) Peng Shuai defeated (Russia) Ekaterina Makarova / (Russia) Elena Vesnina, 6–4, 7–5.

== Tournament ==
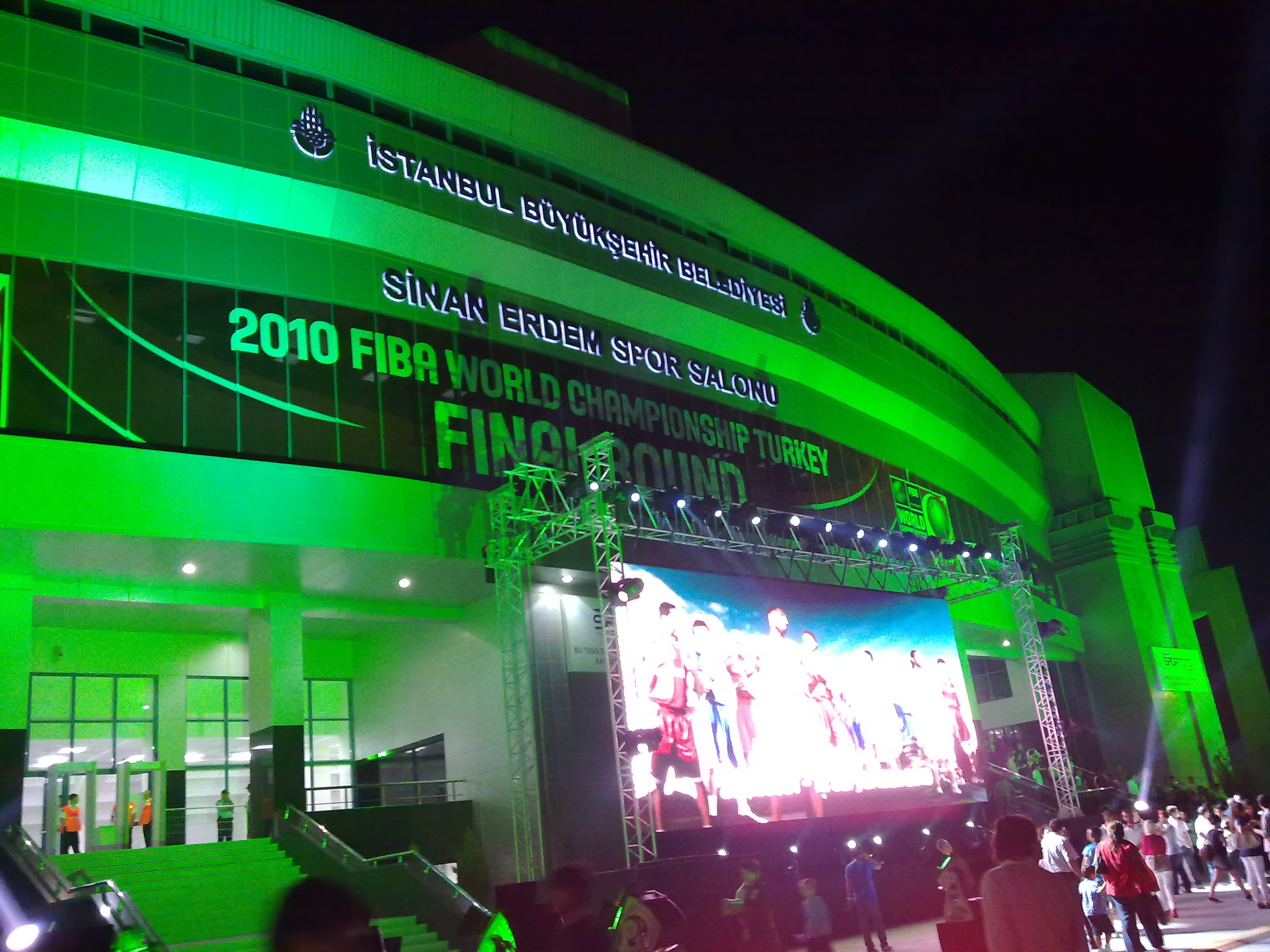
Sinan Erdem Dome hosted the WTA Championships for the second time in 2012.

The 2013 WTA Championships took place at the Sinan Erdem Dome 22–27 October 2013, and was the 43rd edition of the event. The tournament was run by the Women's Tennis Association (WTA) as part of the 2013 WTA Tour.

=== Format ===
The singles event featured eight players in a round robin event, split into two groups of four. Over the first four days of competition, each player met the other three players in her group, with the top two in each group advancing to the semifinals. The first-placed player in one group met the second-placed player in the other group, and vice versa. The winners of each semifinal met in the championship match.

==== Round robin tie-breaking methods ====
The final standings of each group were determined by the first of the following methods that applied:

1. Greatest number of wins
2. Greatest number of matches played; or
3. Head-to-head results if only two players are tied, or if three players are tied then:

a If three players each have the same number of wins, a player having played less than all three matches is automatically eliminated and the player advancing to the single elimination competition is the winner of the match-up of the two remaining tied players; or
b Highest percentage of sets won; or
c Highest percentage of games won

The doubles competition had four teams playing in a straight knockout format from the semifinal stage.

== Prize money and points ==
The total prize money for the 2013 WTA Championships was US$6,000,000.

Stage	Singles	Doubles	Points ^{1}
Champion	RR^{2} + $1,590,000	$460,000	RR^{3} + 810
Runner-up	RR^{2} + $535,000	$230,000	RR^{3} + 360
Semifinalist	RR^{2} + $36,500	$115,000	RR^{3}
Round robin (3 wins)	$555,000^{2}	—N/a	690
Round robin (2 wins)	$415,000^{2}	—N/a	530
Round robin (1 win)	$275,000^{2}	—N/a	370
Round robin (0 wins)	$135,000^{2}	—N/a	210
Participation fee	$70,000	—N/a	—N/a
Alternates	$61,000	—N/a	—N/a

- ^{1} for every match played in the round robin a player got 70 points automatically, and for each round robin win they got 160 additional points
- ^{2} Each round robin win gives an additional $160,000 and each loss gives an additional $20,000. Playing all 3 matches gives an additional $5,000.
- ^{3} RR means prize money or points won in the round robin round. RR for doubles was 690

== Qualified players ==
=== Singles ===
#	Players	Points	Tourn	Date Qualified
1	Serena Williams (USA)	12,040	16(14)	5 August
2	Victoria Azarenka (BLR)	7,676	15(13)	24 August
inj	Maria Sharapova (RUS)	5,891	14(10)	23 September
3	Agnieszka Radwańska (POL)	5,890	20	23 September
4	Li Na (CHN)	5,120	17(14)	27 September
5	Petra Kvitová (CZE)	4,370	22	7 October
6	Sara Errani (ITA)	4,190	21	7 October
7	Jelena Janković (SRB)	3,860	19	7 October
8	Angelique Kerber (GER)	3,715	21(20)	11 October

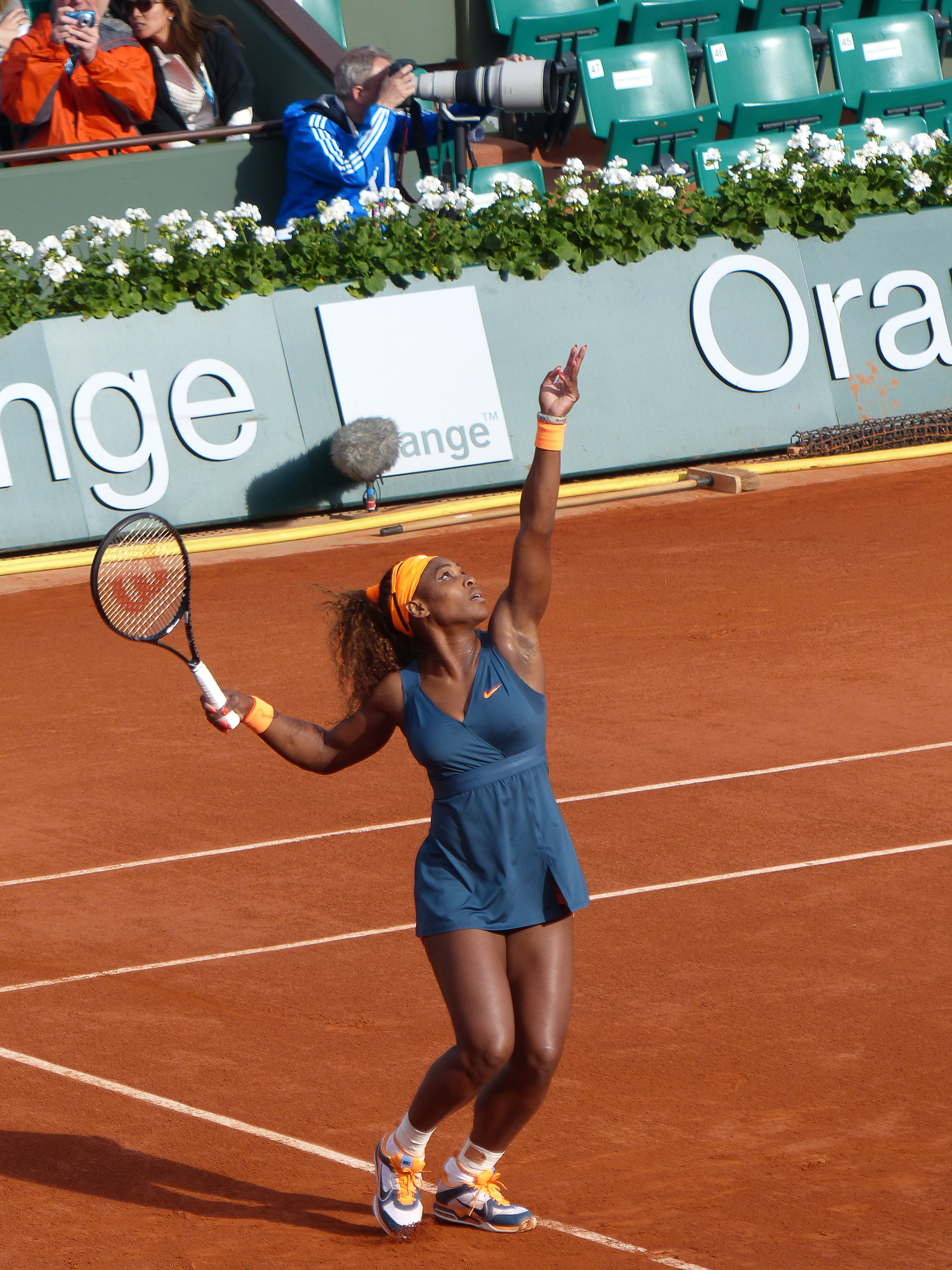
Serena Williams won her second French Open title in 2013.

On 5 August, Serena Williams became the first player to qualify for the championships.

Serena Williams started the year with high expectations after finishing the 2012 season strongly. She won the Brisbane International against Anastasia Pavlyuchenkova with the loss of just 17 games and was the favorite to win the Australian Open. However, she twisted her ankle during her first round match against Edina Gallovits-Hall. Despite advancing to the second week of the tournament, she lost to Sloane Stephens in the quarterfinals. Williams returned to competition at the Qatar Open where she reclaimed the world No. 1 by winning her quarterfinals match. She lost in three sets in the final to Victoria Azarenka. After the loss, Williams went on a 34-match winning streak with titles at the Sony Open Tennis over Maria Sharapova, Family Circle Cup over Jelena Janković, Mutua Madrid Open over Sharapova, Internazionali BNL d'Italia over Azarenka, and her second French Open title defeating defending champion Sharapova in straight sets in the final. She became the fourth woman in the Open era after Martina Navratilova, Chris Evert and Steffi Graf to win each Grand Slam title twice or more. Her streak ended at the fourth round of Wimbledon losing to Sabine Lisicki but rebounded three weeks later by claiming her first international-level title in Swedish Open defeating Johanna Larsson in two sets. This win marked Williams being undefeated in clay in 2013. Williams started her US Open Series at the Rogers Cup where she won her eight title of the year against Sorana Cîrstea. She reached the final of Western & Southern Open a week later, an achievement that clinched her the first-place position of the 2013 US Open Series, but lost to Azarenka. Williams won her 17th Slam singles title at the US Open where she defeated Azarenka in three sets in the final. At the China Open, Williams won her 10th title over Jelena Janković. This is the first time Williams reached double digits in titles in a single season. Williams went into the 2013 Championships as the defending champion.

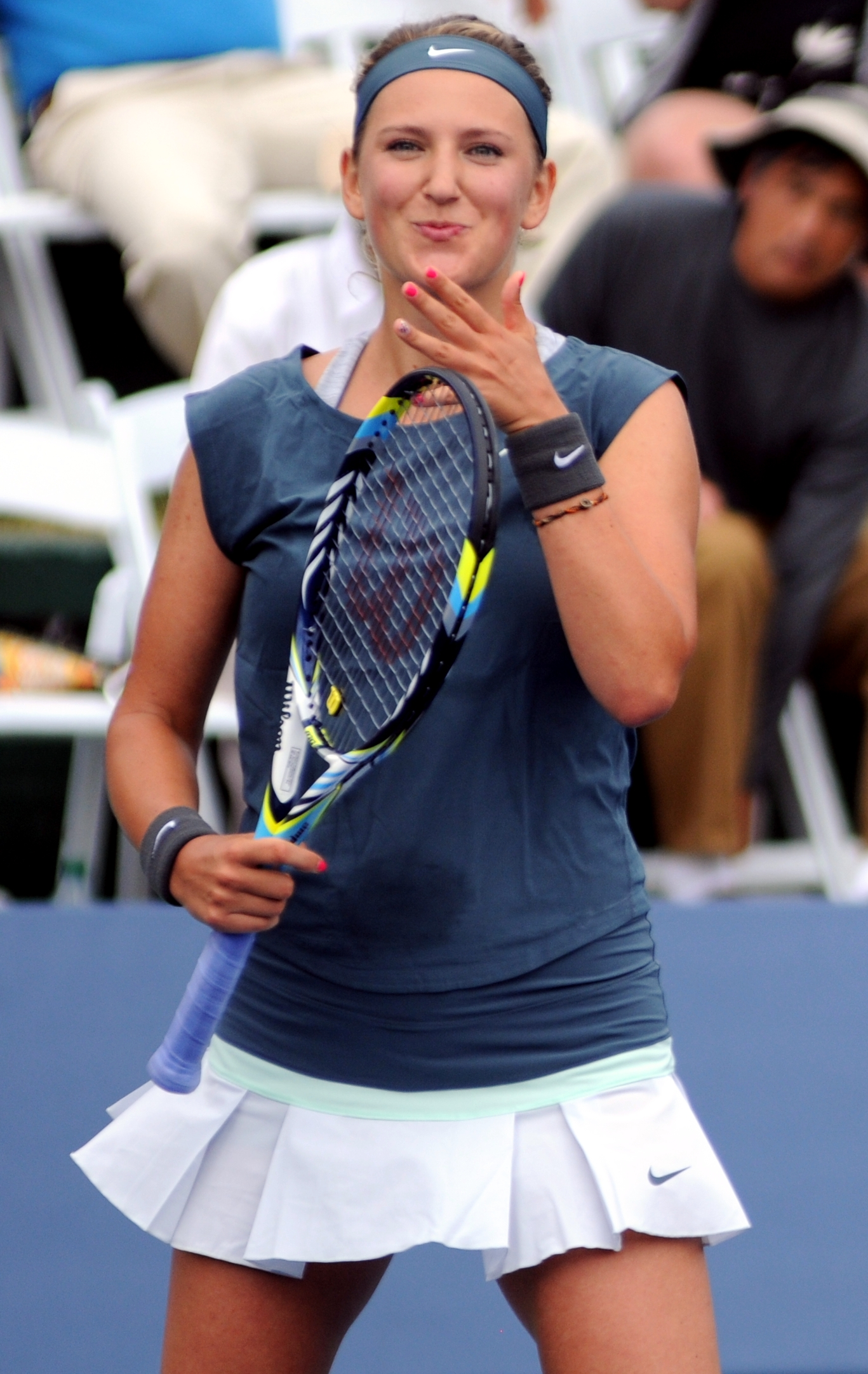
Victoria Azarenka successfully defended her Australian Open title in 2013.

On 24 August, Victoria Azarenka claimed the second singles spot at the Championships.

Victoria Azarenka started the year as the world No. 1 and played her first tournament in Brisbane where she withdrew before her semifinals match against Serena Williams. She successfully defended her Australian Open crown after defeating Li Na in the final, claiming her second Major. Despite defending her Qatar Total Open title and defeating Williams for the first time since 2009 in the final, Azarenka relinquished her number 1 ranking to Williams. At the BNP Paribas Open, she withdrew before her quarterfinals match against Caroline Wozniacki and missed Sony Open Tennis. She reached the final of Internazionali BNL d'Italia losing to Williams in two sets. She reached the semifinals of the French Open for the first time in her career losing to Maria Sharapova in three sets. At Wimbledon, she withdrew before her second round match against Flavia Pennetta due to a knee injury. She returned to competition at the Southern California Open and lost in the final to Samantha Stosur. She then won her 3rd title at the Western & Southern Open, defeating Williams for the second time in the season. Azarenka reached the final of the US Open where she lost to Williams in three sets. In the Toray Pan Pacific Open and China Open, Azarenka suffered two consecutive losses in her opening matches against Venus Williams and Andrea Petkovic, respectively.

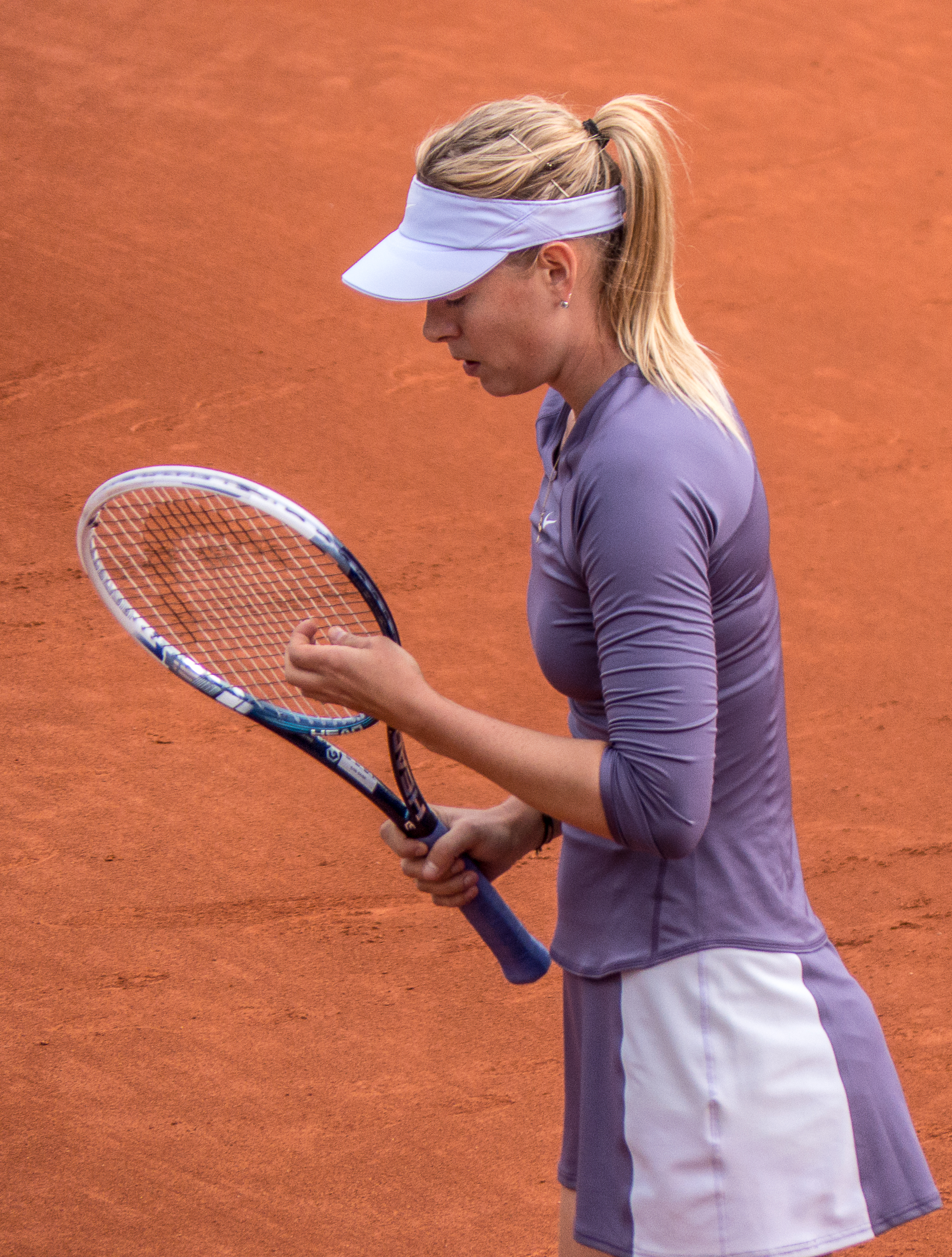
Maria Sharapova reached her second French Open final in 2013.

On 23 September, Maria Sharapova and Agnieszka Radwańska were announced as the third and fourth qualifiers for the Championships.

Maria Sharapova began her year at the Australian Open as the second seed, dropping a record-low nine games en route to the semifinals, where she lost to Li Na in straight sets. She won her first title of the year at the BNP Paribas Open defeating Caroline Wozniacki in the final. She followed it up with a final appearance at the Sony Open Tennis where she lost to Serena Williams. She began her clay-court season campaign with a successful title-defense in Porsche Tennis Grand Prix over Li. She followed it up by reaching the final of Mutua Madrid Open, once again losing to Williams. Coming as the defending champion of the French Open, Sharapova reached the final but lost for the fourth time in the season to Williams in straight-sets. Seeded second at Wimbledon, she lost in the second round to Michelle Larcher de Brito. Sharapova withdrew from the US Open, Toray Pan Pacific Open, and China Open due to a right shoulder injury. However, Sharapova withdrew from the championship due to a right shoulder injury.

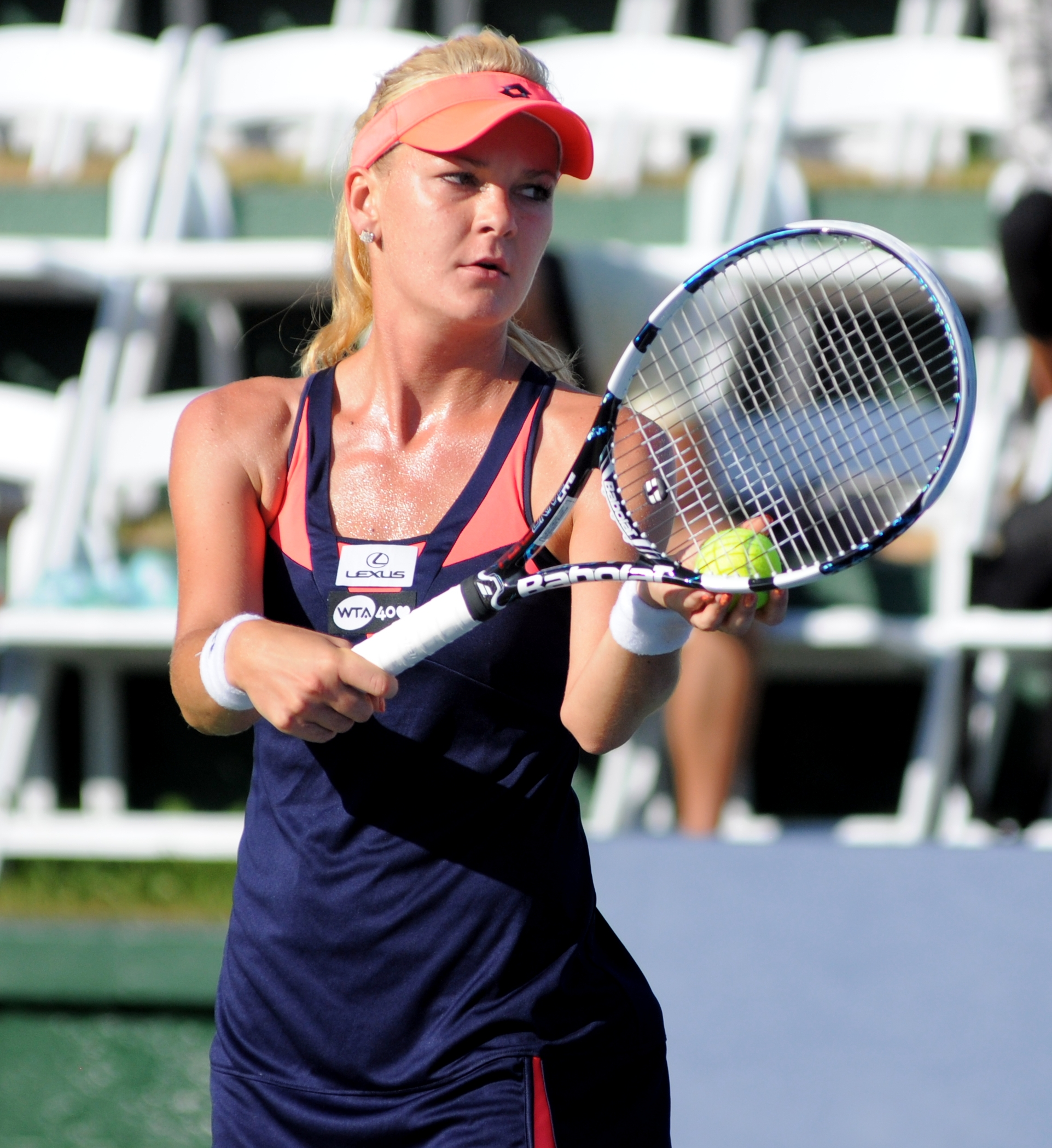
Agnieszka Radwańska reached the semifinals of Wimbledon in 2013.

Agnieszka Radwańska started the season with back to back titles at the ASB Classic over Yanina Wickmayer and Apia International Sydney over Dominika Cibulková in the final, but her streak ended at 13 in the quarterfinals of the Australian Open to Li Na. She reached the quarterfinals of the French Open for the first time losing to Sara Errani. At Wimbledon, she reached the semifinals where she lost in a close-fought three setter against eventual runner-up Sabine Lisicki. She played at the Bank of the West Classic losing to Cibulková in the final. She lost in the fourth round of the US Open to Ekaterina Makarova. She won her third title at the Seoul over Russian Anastasia Pavlyuchenkova.

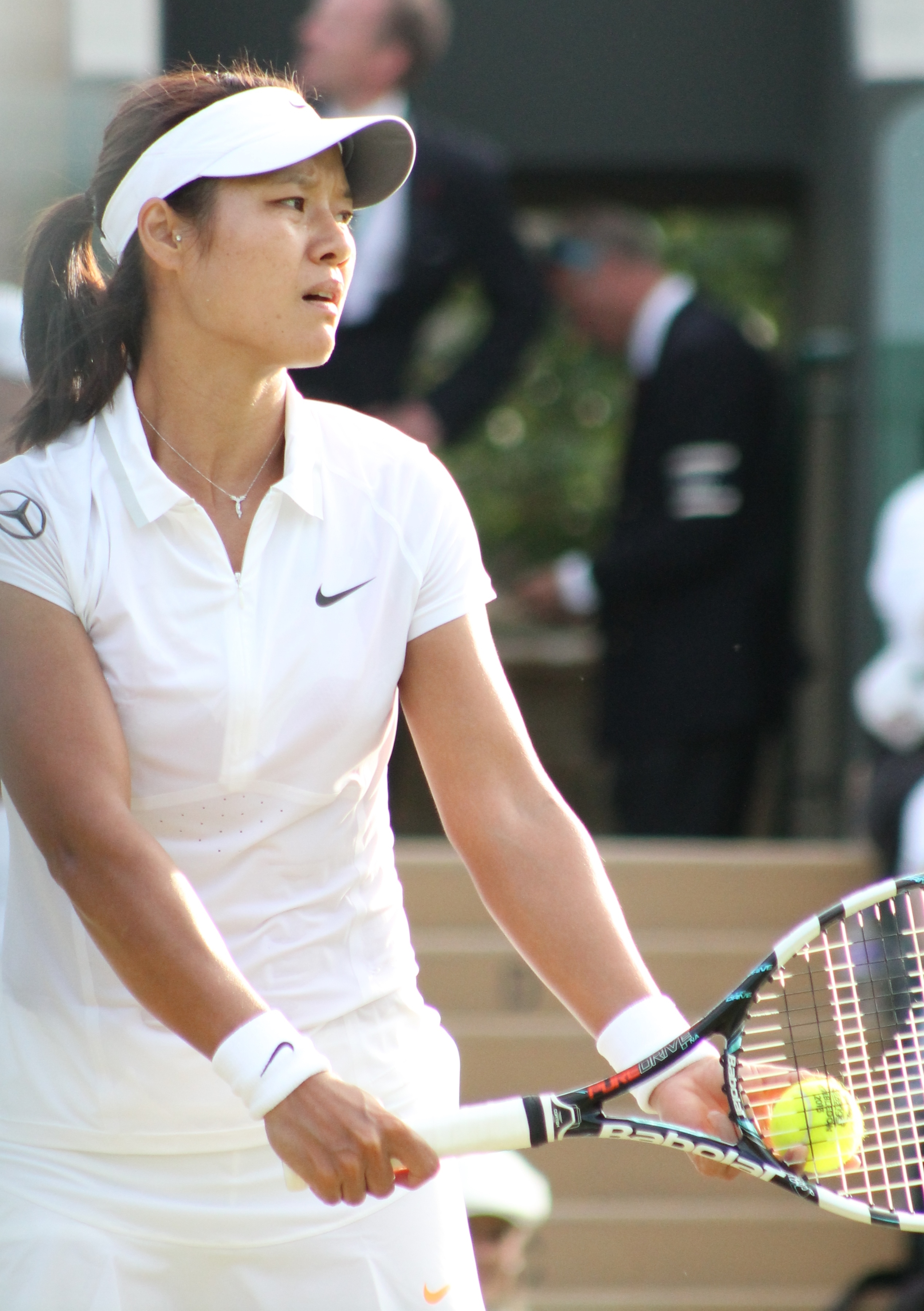
Li Na reached her second Australian Open final in 2013.

On 27 September, Li Na was announced as the fifth singles qualifier of the Championships.

Li Na started the year with a seventh career title at the maiden edition of the Shenzhen Open. She reached her second Australian Open final where she lost to Victoria Azarenka in three sets. After a seven-week absence due to an ankle injury, she returned to the competition at the Sony Open Tennis where she lost to Serena Williams in the quarterfinals. She started her clay court season at the Porsche Tennis Grand Prix where she lost to Maria Sharapova in the final. The remainder of her clay court swing was somewhat disappointing, as she lost in the first round of the Mutua Madrid Open and third round of the Internazionali BNL d'Italia before crashing out in the second round of the French Open to Bethanie Mattek-Sands. She reached the quarterfinals of Wimbledon, losing to Agnieszka Radwańska in three tight sets. Her US Open series campaign was highlighted by semifinal showings at the Rogers Cup and Western & Southern Open, falling to Sorana Cîrstea and Wiliams, respectively. At the US Open, she reached the semifinals for the first time, becoming the first Asian tennis player to do so. She was ousted by eventual champion Serena Williams in straight sets.

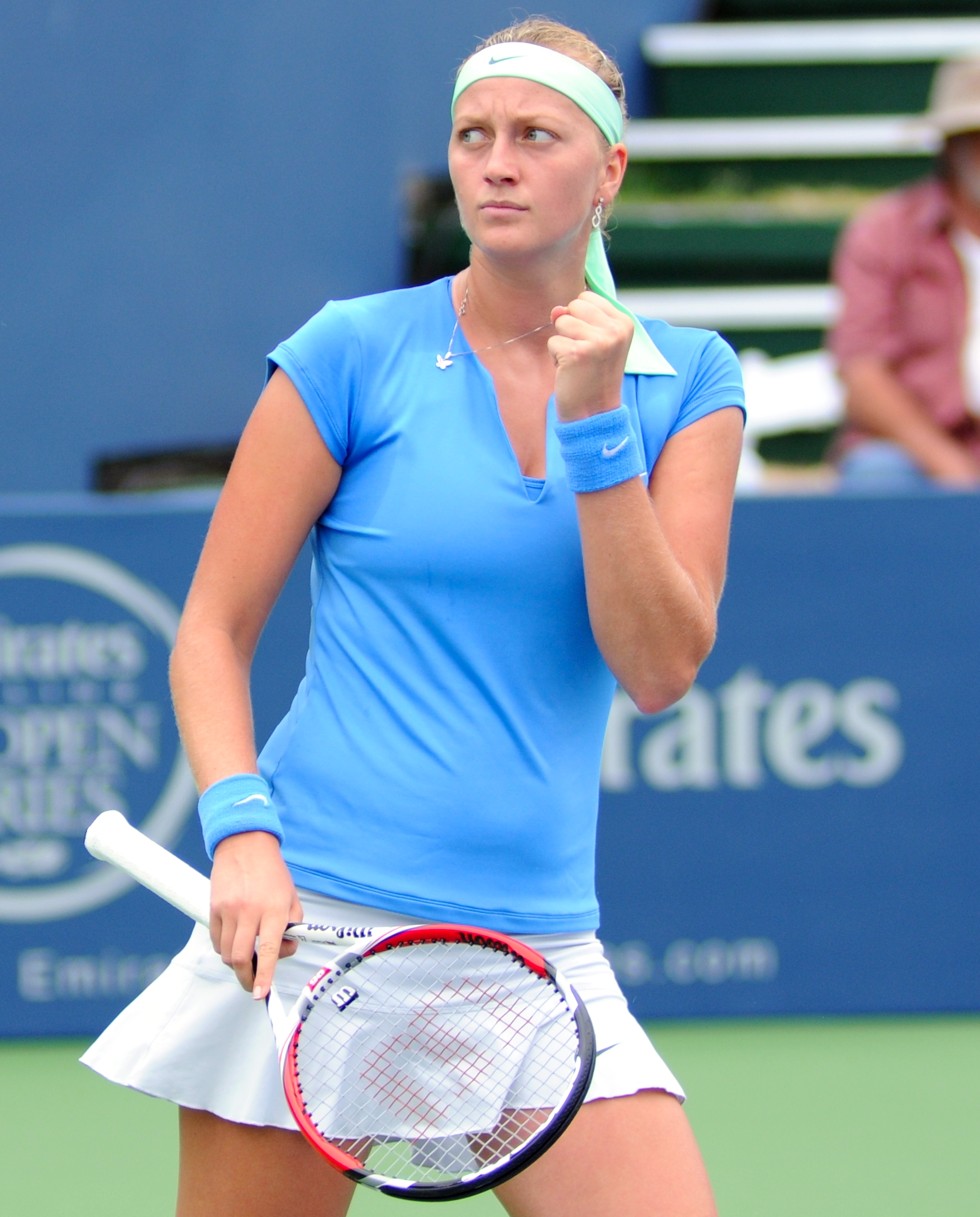
Petra Kvitová qualifies for the Year-End Championship for the third year in a row.

On 7 October, three more spots were filled by Petra Kvitová, Sara Errani, and Jelena Janković.

Petra Kvitová had a disappointing start of 2013, not winning back to back matches in the first month including a loss in the second round of the Australian Open to Laura Robson. She then won her first title of the year at the Dubai Tennis Championship defeating Sara Errani in three sets. She reached her second final of the year at the BNP Paribas Katowice Open but fell to Italian Roberta Vinci. Kvitová then suffered a third round loss at the French Open at the hands of American Jamie Hampton. At Wimbledon, she was able to reach the quarterfinals for the 4th year in a row but received an upset in the hands of Belgian Kirsten Flipkens. As the defending champion at the New Haven Open at Yale she reached the final, but ended in the losing side against Simona Halep. At the US Open, Kvitová fell convincingly to American wildcard Alison Riske in the third round in 65 minutes. She then won her 11th career title at the Toray Pan Pacific Open beating German Angelique Kerber in three sets.

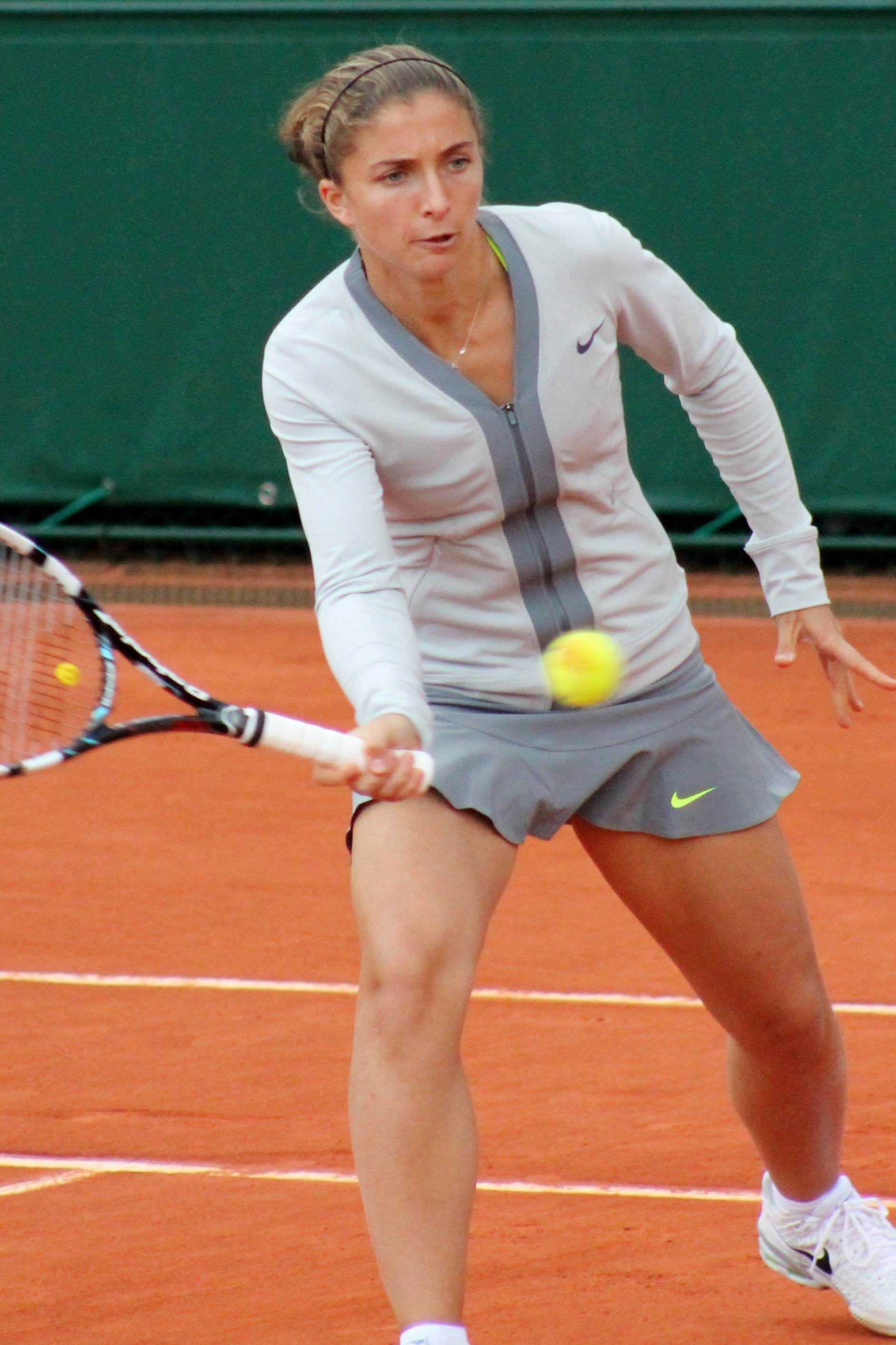
Sara Errani reached the semifinals of the French Open for the second year in a row.

Sara Errani, despite reaching a career high ranking of No. 5 in 2013, had less success than in 2012. At the Australian Open, as the seventh seed was upset by Carla Suárez Navarro in the first round. She reached her first final of the year at the Open GDF Suez losing to Mona Barthel in two close sets. She then reached the final of the Dubai Tennis Championships falling to Petra Kvitová in three sets. The following week, She defended her title at the Abierto Mexicano Telcel defeating Spaniard Carla Suárez Navarro. At the French Open, Errani reached the semifinals losing to Serena Williams in convincing fashion. She then suffered her second first round loss in a Major in the year at Wimbledon to Monica Puig. As the defending champion at the Internazionali Femminili di Palermo, she reached the final against compatriot and doubles partner Roberta Vinci, but lost in three sets. At the US Open, she was upset by Flavia Pennetta in the second round.

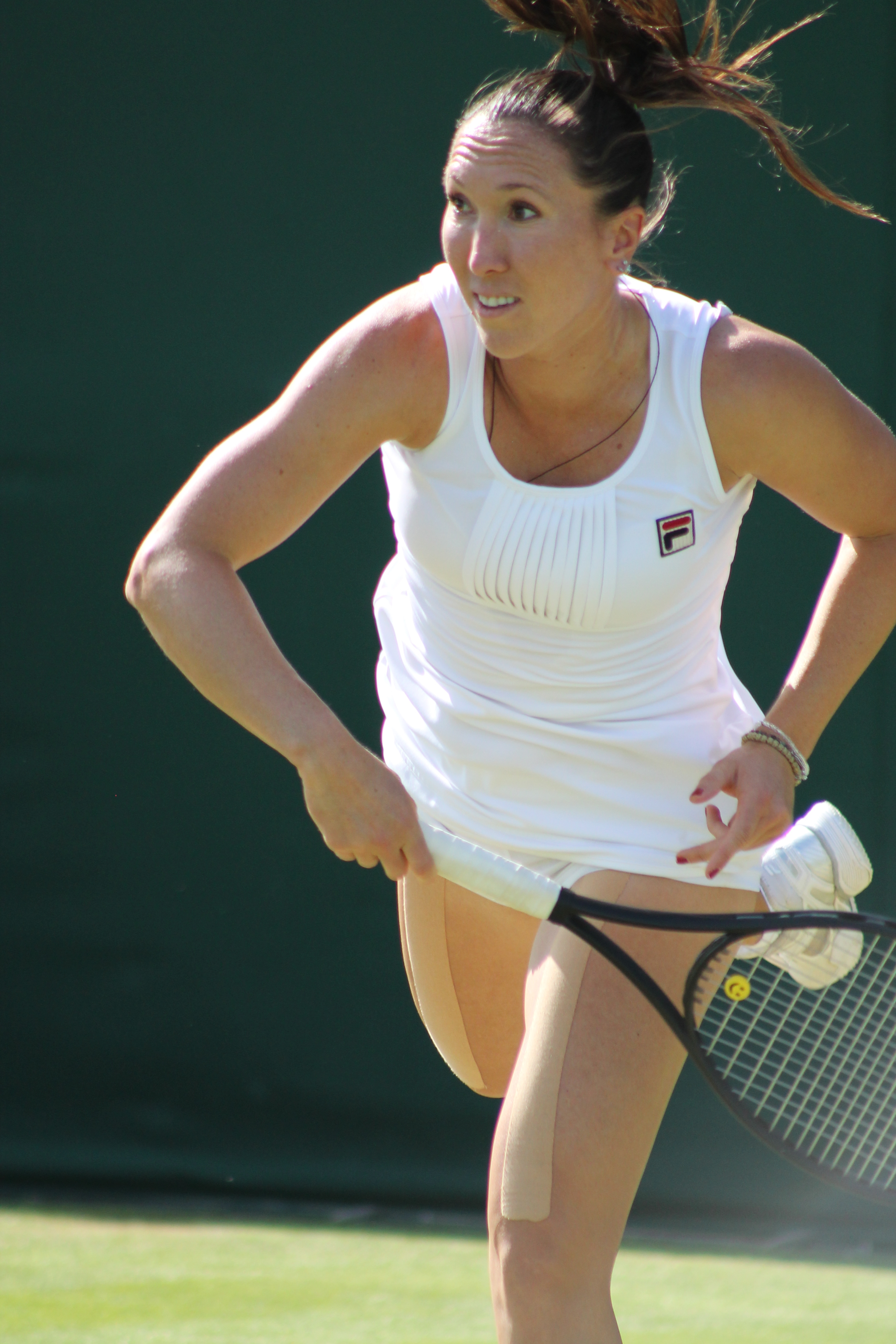
Jelena Janković qualifies for the first time since 2010.

Jelena Janković had a resurgent season in 2013, returning in the top 10 for the first time since 2011. Janković reached the third round of the Australian Open but lost in an all-Serbian match to Ana Ivanovic. She then reached her first title in three years at Copa Colsanitas defeating the young Argentine Paula Ormaechea. She then reached her second final of the year at the Family Circle Cup facing world number 1 Serena Williams, but lost in three sets. Janković then reached her first slam quarterfinals since 2010 at the French Open, but lost to defending champion Maria Sharapova in three sets. However, at Wimbledon, she was upset by her younger compatriot Vesna Dolonc in the second round. At the final Major of the year at the US Open she reached the fourth round losing to China's Li Na. She reached the final of the China Open but for the second time in the year, lost in the final to Serena Williams.

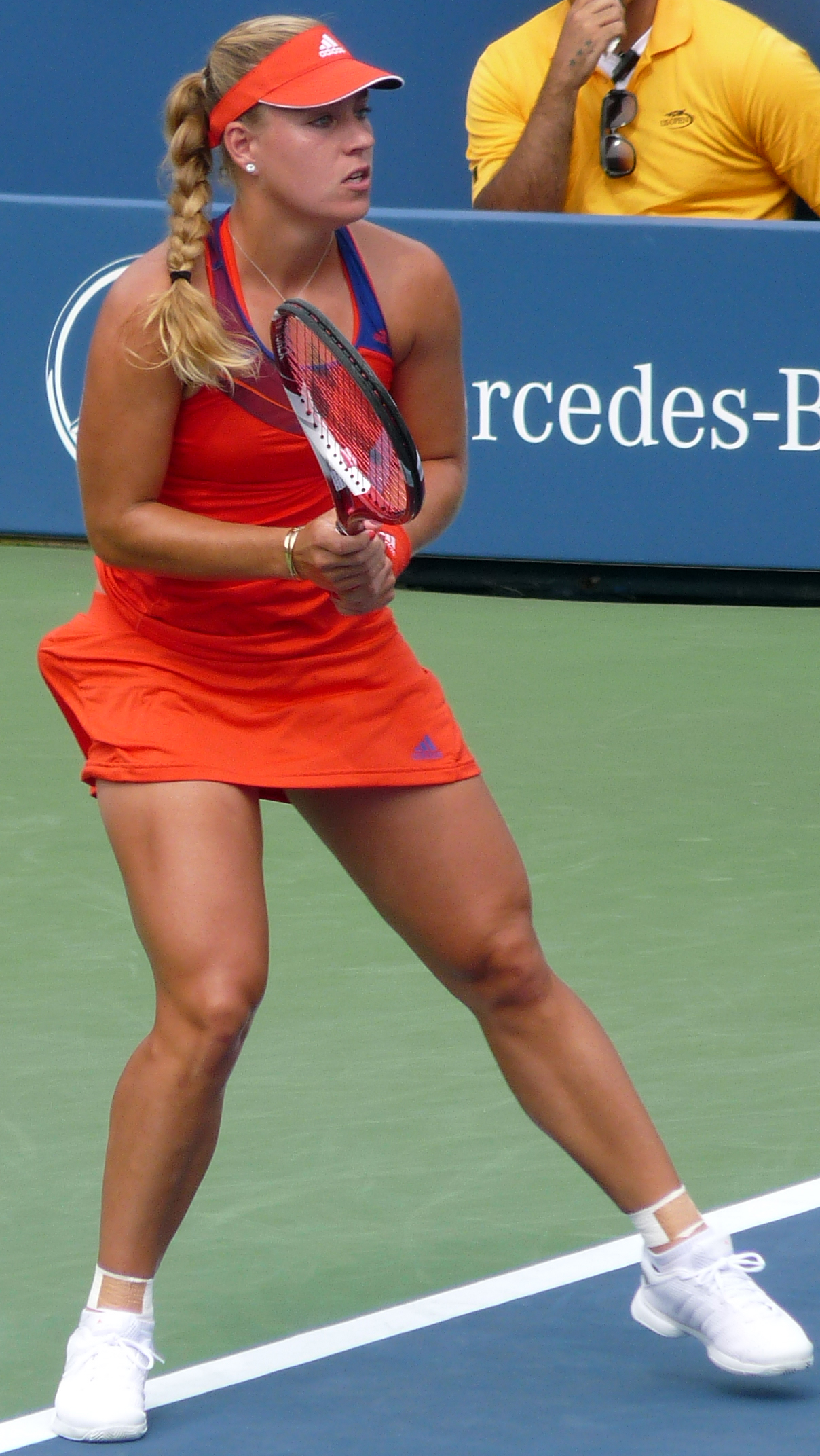
Angelique Kerber qualifies for the second year in a row.

On 11 October, after the withdrawal of Maria Sharapova, one more spot was made available and it was filled by German no. 1 Angelique Kerber.

Angelique Kerber did not enjoy the same success she had in 2012, though remained in the top 10. The German reached her first final of the year at the Monterrey Open but lost to Russian Anastasia Pavlyuchenkova. She did not reach another final until the back end of the year at the Toray Pan Pacific Open falling to Petra Kvitová. Kerber won her lone title of the year at the Generali Ladies Linz defeating Serbian Ana Ivanovic in straight sets, on her fourth match point. At the Majors, Kerber failed to reach the quarterfinals of all four, losing in the fourth rounds of the Australian Open to Ekaterina Makarova, the French Open to Svetlana Kuznetsova, and the US Open to Carla Suárez Navarro. At Wimbledon as last year's semifinalist, she fell in the second round to Kaia Kanepi in three sets, despite being 5–1 up in the second set tie-break.

The first alternate for the championships was former world No. 1 Caroline Wozniacki. Wozniacki reached the final of the BNP Paribas Open losing to Maria Sharapova in the final. She won her lone title of the year at the BGL Luxembourg Open defeating youngster Annika Beck. At the Majors Wozniacki didn't fare well, with her best showing coming at the Australian Open losing to Svetlana Kuznetsova in the round of 16 in three sets. She then fell in the second rounds of Wimbledon and French Open losing to Bojana Jovanovski and Petra Cetkovská in straight sets. She also fell in the third round of the US Open to Camila Giorgi. The second alternate was Sloane Stephens, who failed to reach a final, but went deep in Slams. Stephens reached the semifinals defeating Serena Williams in three, before losing to Victoria Azarenka. She reached the fourth rounds of French Open and US Open losing to Sharapova and Serena in straight sets. At Wimbledon, she lost to Marion Bartoli in the quarterfinals.

=== Doubles ===
#	Players	Points	Tourn	Date Qualified
1	Sara Errani (ITA); Roberta Vinci (ITA)	7,415	14	6 September
2	Hsieh Su-wei (TPE); Peng Shuai (CHN)	6,245	13	4 October
3	Nadia Petrova (RUS); Katarina Srebotnik (SLO)	6,155	13	4 October
4	Elena Vesnina (RUS); Ekaterina Makarova (RUS)	5,971	10	4 October

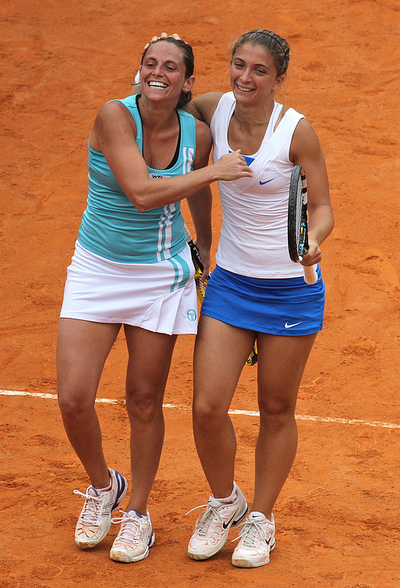
Sara Errani and Roberta Vinci won the 2013 Australian Open.

On 23 September, Sara Errani and Roberta Vinci were announced as the first team to qualify for the Championships.

Sara Errani & Roberta Vinci reached their first final of the year at the Apia International Sydney losing to Petrova & Srebotnik. They then went to a 20-match winning streak beginning with their third slam title as a team at the Australian Open defeating the Australian duo Barty & Dellacqua. Followed by titles at the Open GDF Suez defeating Hlaváčková & Huber, and at the Qatar Total Open defeating Petrova & Srebotnik. They then reached consecutive finals at the Internazionali BNL d'Italia and French Open as defending champions but lost in both to Hsieh & Peng and Makarova & Vesnina.

On 4 October, the three remaining spots were filled by the teams of Peng Shuai and Hsieh Su-wei, Nadia Petrova and Katarina Srebotnik, and Elena Vesnina and Ekaterina Makarova.

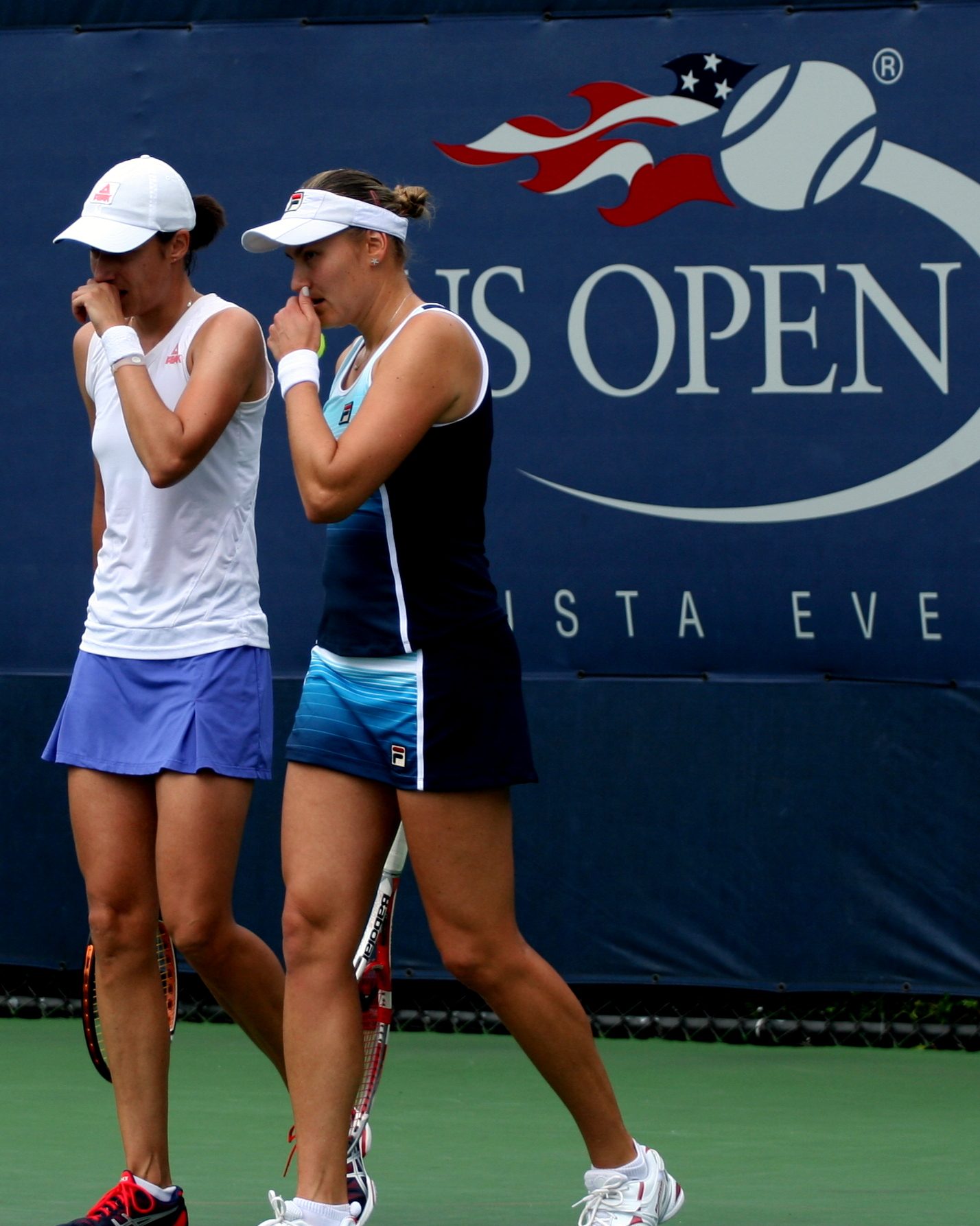
Nadia Petrova and Katarina Srebotnik won 3 titles as a team.

Peng Shuai & Hsieh Su-wei had their most successful season in 2013. They claimed their first title of the year at the Internazionali BNL d'Italia over world number 1's Errani & Vinci. They then won their first Major as a team and as individuals at the Wimbledon Championships defeating the Australian pairing of Barty & Dellacqua. Their third title came at the Western & Southern Open beating Grönefeld & Peschke in the final. They then beat King & Voskoboeva in the final of Guangzhou International Women's Open.

Nadia Petrova & Katarina Srebotnik reached six finals in 2013 and claimed half of them. They reached their first final of the year at the Apia International Sydney defeating top seeds Errani & Vinci. They then reached back-to-back finals at the Qatar Total Open and Dubai Tennis Championships but fell in both in a match tie-break losing to Errani & Vinci and to Mattek-Sands & Mirza. They reached back-to-back finals again, but with mixed results, losing in the final of the BNP Paribas Open to Makarova & Vesnina and won at the Sony Open Tennis defeating Raymond & Robson. They claimed their third title defeating Niculescu & Zakopalová in the final. Srebotnik also partnered with Jelena Janković to win the Rogers Cup over Grönefeld & Peschke. Srebotnik then reached the final of New Haven Open at Yale with Anabel Medina Garrigues losing to Mirza & Zheng.

Elena Vesnina & Ekaterina Makarova had a very successful year despite reaching only 2 finals, which they both won. They claimed their first title of the year at the BNP Paribas Open defeating Petrova & Srebotnik. They then claimed their first women's doubles slam title at the French Open defeating defending champions Errani & Vinci. They also reached the semifinals of the Australian Open losing to Errani & Vinci

== Groupings ==
The 2013 edition of the year–end championships featured three current or former World number ones, four Grand Slam champions, three Grand Slam finalists. The competitors were divided into two groups representing the colors of the flag of Turkey. The Red group consisted of no. 1 seed Serena Williams, no. 3 seed Agnieszka Radwańska, no. 5 seed Petra Kvitová, and no. 8 seed Angelique Kerber. The White Group was composed of no. 2 seed Victoria Azarenka, no. 4 seed Li Na, no. 6 seed Sara Errani, and no. 7 seed Jelena Janković. Caroline Wozniacki and Sloane Stephens served as alternates.

In the red group, their respective records in their group, Serena Williams was 13–1, Agnieszka Radwańska was 6–14, Petra Kvitová was 6–7, and Angelique Kerber was 6–9. Williams has an almost perfect record in her group, she is 7–0 against Radwańska, including three wins in 2013 the last being at the China Open. Against Czech Kvitová, Williams also has never lost to having a 4–0 record, they met only once in 2013 at the Qatar Total Open, with Williams losing her first set to Kvitová but still won the match. Williams only loss in her group came against Kerber having a slight edge of 2–1, they failed to meet in 2013, with their last encounter coming in last year Tour Championships, with Williams winning in two sets. Radwańska has mixed record against the other two members in her group, she is 1–4 against Kvitová, with her only win coming in last year's Tour Championships, but Kvitová won their last meeting at the Dubai Tennis Championships. Radwańska has a winning record against Kerber leading 5–3, winning four of the last five, including a two set win in the China Open. The final match–up between Kvitová and Kerber saw an even head-to-head giving 2 wins each, with Kvitová winning the last match at the final of Toray Pan Pacific Open.

In the white group, in their head–to–heads with players within their group, Victoria Azarenka was 17–8, Li Na was 14–10, Sara Errani was 1–12, and Jelena Janković was 8–10. Azarenka like Williams, leads all her head-to-head match up in her group. Azarenka is 6–4 against Li, including winning their last five matches, with the last coming at the final of the Australian Open with a three set win for Azarenka. Azarenka is 6–1 against Errani, they met twice in 2013 with Azarenka winning both, with the last encounter coming at the Internazionali BNL d'Italia. Against Janković, Azarenka leads the match–up 5–3, with Azarenka winning the last four, including once in 2013 at the Western & Southern Open. Li leads her other two match-ups in her group. In the match–up between Li and Errani, Li has won all their five meetings with the last coming at the 2012 Rogers Cup. Against Janković, Li has the slight lead of 5–4, however they split their two meetings in 2013 with Li winning the last one at the US Open. In the last head–to–head between Janković and Errani, Janković won their only encounter at the 2010 BNP Paribas Open.

== Player head-to-head ==
Below are the head-to-head records as they approached the tournament.

		Williams	Azarenka	Radwańska	Li	Kvitová	Errani	Janković	Kerber	Overall	YTD
1	(United States) Serena Williams		13–3	8–0	10–1	5–0	6–0	8–4	3–1	53–9	78–4
2	(Belarus) Victoria Azarenka	3–13		12–3	6–5	2–4	7–1	5–4	3–0	38–30	44–8
3	(Poland) Agnieszka Radwańska	0–8	3–12		5–6	1–5	7–2	4–1	5–4	25–38	58–19
4	(China) Li Na	1–10	5–6	6–5		4–3	6–0	6–4	7–1	35–29	44–14
5	(Czech Republic) Petra Kvitová	0–5	4–2	5–1	3–4		6–0	2–1	3–2	23–15	51–23
6	(Italy) Sara Errani	0–6	1–7	2–7	0–6	0–6		1–1	2–1	6–34	47–24
7	(Serbia) Jelena Janković	4–8	4–5	1–4	4–6	1–2	1–1		0–1	15–27	46–21
8	(Germany) Angelique Kerber	1–3	0–3	4–5	1–7	2–3	1–2	1–0		10–23	45–23

== Day-by-day summaries ==
=== Day 1 ===
Matches
Group	Winner	Loser	Score
White Group	(Belarus) Victoria Azarenka [2]	(Italy) Sara Errani [6]	7–6^{(7–4)}, 6–2
Red Group	(United States) Serena Williams [1]	(Germany) Angelique Kerber [8]	6–3, 6–1
Red Group	(Czech Republic) Petra Kvitová [5]	(Poland) Agnieszka Radwańska [3]	6–4, 6–4

=== Day 2 ===
Matches
Group	Winner	Loser	Score
White Group	(China) Li Na [4]	(Italy) Sara Errani [6]	6–3, 7–6^{(7–5)}
White Group	(Serbia) Jelena Janković [7]	(Belarus) Victoria Azarenka [2]	6–4, 6–2
Red Group	(United States) Serena Williams [1]	(Poland) Agnieszka Radwańska [3]	6–2, 6–4

=== Day 3 ===
Matches
Group	Winner	Loser	Score
White Group	(China) Li Na [4]	(Serbia) Jelena Janković [7]	6–3, 2–6, 6–3
Red Group	(Germany) Angelique Kerber [8]	(Poland) Agnieszka Radwańska [3]	6–2, 6–2
Red Group	(United States) Serena Williams [1]	(Czech Republic) Petra Kvitová [5]	6–2, 6–3

=== Day 4 ===
Matches
Group	Winner	Loser	Score
White Group	(China) Li Na [4]	(Belarus) Victoria Azarenka [2]	6–2, 6–1
Red Group	(Czech Republic) Petra Kvitová [5]	(Germany) Angelique Kerber [8]	6–7^{(3–7)}, 6–2, 6–3
White Group	(Italy) Sara Errani [6]	(Serbia) Jelena Janković [7]	6–4, 6–4

=== Day 5 ===
Matches
Semifinals	Winner	Loser	Score
Doubles	(Chinese Taipei) Hsieh Su-wei (China) Peng Shuai [2]	(Russia) Nadia Petrova (Slovenia) Katarina Srebotnik [3]	7–6^{(7–5)}, 6–2
Singles	(China) Li Na [4]	(Czech Republic) Petra Kvitová [5]	6–4, 6–2
Singles	(United States) Serena Williams [1]	(Serbia) Jelena Janković [7]	6–4, 2–6, 6–4
Doubles	(Russia) Elena Vesnina (Russia) Ekaterina Makarova [4]	(Italy) Sara Errani (Italy) Roberta Vinci [1]	4–6, 7–5, [10–3]

=== Day 6 ===
Matches
Final	Winner	Loser	Score
Doubles	(Chinese Taipei) Hsieh Su-wei (China) Peng Shuai [2]	(Russia) Ekaterina Makarova (Russia) Elena Vesnina [4]	6–4, 7–5
Singles	(United States) Serena Williams [1]	(China) Li Na [4]	2–6, 6–3, 6–0

== Points breakdown ==
=== Singles ===
Those with a gold background have enough points to qualify.

Rank	Athlete	Grand Slam tournament				Premier Mandatory				Best Premier 5		Best other						Total points	Tourn
Rank	Athlete	AUS	FRA	WIM	USO	IW	MIA	MAD	BEI	1	2	1	2	3	4	5	6	Total points	Tourn
1	(United States) Serena Williams	QF; 500	W 2000	R16; 280	W 2000	A 0	W 1000	W 1000	W 1000	W 900	W 900	F 620	F 620	W 470	W 470	W 280	A 0	12,040	16(14)
2	(Belarus) Victoria Azarenka	W 2000	SF; 900	R64; 100	F 1400	QF; 250	A 0	R32; 80	R64; 5	W 900	W 900	F 620	F 320	SF; 200	R32; 1	A 0		7,676	15(13)
3	(Russia) Maria Sharapova	SF; 900	F 1400	R64; 100	A 0	W 1000	F 700	F 700	A 0	SF; 395	QF; 225	W 470	R32; 1	A 0	A 0			5,891	14(10)
4	(Poland) Agnieszka Radwańska	QF; 500	QF; 500	SF; 900	R16; 280	R16; 140	SF; 450	R32; 80	SF; 450	SF; 395	SF; 395	W 470	F 320	W 280	W 280	QF; 225	QF; 225	5,890	20
5	(China) Li Na	F 1400	R64; 100	QF; 500	SF; 900	A 0	QF; 250	R64; 5	QF; 250	SF; 395	SF; 395	F 320	W 280	SF; 200	R16; 125	A 0	A 0	5,120	17(14)
6	(Czech Republic) Petra Kvitová	R64; 100	R32; 160	QF; 500	R32; 160	QF; 250	R32; 80	R32; 80	SF; 450	W 900	QF; 225	W 470	F 320	QF; 225	F 200	R16; 125	R16; 125	4,370	22
7	(Italy) Sara Errani	R128; 5	SF; 900	R128; 5	R64; 100	QF; 250	QF; 250	SF; 450	R16; 140	SF; 395	QF; 225	F 320	F 320	W 280	QF; 225	F 200	R16; 125	4,190	21
8	(Serbia) Jelena Janković	R32; 160	QF; 500	R64; 100	R16; 280	R64; 5	SF; 450	R64; 5	F 700	SF; 395	QF; 225	F 320	W 280	SF; 130	R16; 125	R16; 125	R16; 60	3,860	19
9	(Germany) Angelique Kerber	R16; 280	R16; 280	R64; 100	R16; 280	SF; 450	R32; 80	QF; 250	QF; 250	F 620	R16; 125	W 280	F 200	SF; 200	SF; 200	QF; 120	A 0	3,715	22(21)
10	(Denmark) Caroline Wozniacki	R16; 280	R64; 100	R64; 100	R32; 160	F 700	R32; 80	R64; 5	QF; 250	SF; 395	QF; 225	W 280	QF; 225	SF; 200	SF; 200	SF; 200	QF; 120	3,520	23
11	(United States) Sloane Stephens	SF; 900	R16; 280	QF; 500	R16; 280	R64; 5	R16; 140	R64; 5	R16; 140	R16; 125	R16; 125	SF; 130	R16; 125	QF; 120	QF; 120	QF; 120	R32; 70	3,185	22

=== Doubles ===
Rank	Team	Points											Total points	Tourn
Rank	Team	1	2	3	4	5	6	7	8	9	10	11	Total points	Tourn
1	(Italy) Sara Errani (Italy) Roberta Vinci	W 2000	F 1400	W 900	F 620	QF; 500	W 470	SF; 450	F 320	R16; 280	QF; 225	QF; 225	7,390	13
2	(Chinese Taipei) Hsieh Su-wei (China) Peng Shuai	W 2000	W 900	W 900	QF; 500	SF; 450	SF; 450	SF; 395	R16; 280	W 280	R32; 160	R16; 140	6,455	11
3	(Russia) Nadia Petrova (Slovenia) Katarina Srebotnik	W 1,000	SF; 900	F 700	F 620	QF; 500	QF; 500	W 470	W 470	SF; 395	F 320	R16; 280	6,155	12
4	(Russia) Elena Vesnina (Russia) Ekaterina Makarova	W 2,000	W 1,000	SF; 900	QF; 500	SF; 395	SF; 395	R16; 280	QF; 250	QF; 250	R16; 1		5,971	10
5	(Australia) Casey Dellacqua (Australia) Ashleigh Barty	F 1400	F 1400	F 1400	W 280	W 130	R64; 5	R16; 5	R16; 1				4,621	8

== See also ==
- WTA ranking Points
- 2013 ATP World Tour Finals
- 2013 WTA Tournament of Champions
