= 2013 US Open Series =

In tennis, the 2013 US Open Series (known as Emirates Airline US Open Series for sponsorships reasons) was the tenth edition of the US Open Series, which included ten hard court tournaments that started on July 20, 2013 in Atlanta and concluded in Winston-Salem for the men and in New Haven for the women on August 24, 2013. This edition consisted of four separate men's tournaments and four women's tournaments, with the Western & Southern Open hosting both a men's and women's event. The series was headlined by two ATP World Tour Masters 1000 and two WTA Premier 5 events. Rafael Nadal and Serena Williams were the US Open Series winners, making them eligible for a $1 million bonus if either also won the US Open, a feat which they both accomplished, hence receiving the largest paychecks to date for a single tennis tournament, totalling $3.6 million each.

== Point distribution for series events ==
In order to be included in the standings and subsequently the bonus prize money, a player needed to have countable results from two different tournaments. The players who finished in the top three in the series can earn up to $1 million in extra prize money at the US Open.

Round	ATP World Tour 1000 WTA Premier 5	ATP World Tour 500 & 250 WTA Premier
Winner	100	70
Finalist	70	45
Semifinalist	45	25
Quarterfinalist	25	15
Round of 16	15	0

== US Open Series standings ==
The standings include all players who received points in at least two tournaments.

=== ATP ===
Rank	Nation	Player	Tours ^{1}	Titles	Points
1	ESP	Rafael Nadal	2	2 (1st, 2nd)	200
2	USA	John Isner	3	1	185
3	ARG	Juan Martín del Potro	3	1	130
4	CAN	Milos Raonic	2		85
5	SRB	Novak Djokovic	2		70
6	RUS	Dmitry Tursunov	3		65
7	RSA	Kevin Anderson	2		60
=	CZE	Tomáš Berdych	2		60
9	GER	Tommy Haas	2		40
=	AUS	Marinko Matosevic	3		40
=	GBR	Andy Murray	2		40
12	BUL	Grigor Dimitrov	2		30
=	UZB	Denis Istomin	2		30

Notes:

- 1 – Tours – Number of tournaments in US Open Series in which a player has reached the quarterfinals or better, in 250 and 500 series events or the Round of 16 in ATP World Tour Masters 1000 events.

=== WTA ===
Rank	Nation	Player	Tours ^{1}	Titles	Points
1	USA	Serena Williams	2	1	170
2	BLR	Victoria Azarenka	2	1	145
3	POL	Agnieszka Radwańska	4		130
4	CZE	Petra Kvitová	4		100
=	AUS	Samantha Stosur	3	1	100
6	SVK	Dominika Cibulková	2	1	95
=	ROM	Sorana Cîrstea	2		95
=	ROM	Simona Halep	2	1	95
9	CHN	Li Na	2		90
10	SRB	Jelena Janković	2		60
11	ITA	Roberta Vinci	3		55
12	DEN	Caroline Wozniacki	2		50
13	USA	Sloane Stephens	3		45
14	ITA	Sara Errani	2		40
=	SRB	Ana Ivanovic	2		40
=	SVK	Magdaléna Rybáriková	2		40
17	POL	Urszula Radwańska	2		30
=	RUS	Elena Vesnina	2		30

Notes:

- 1 – Tours – Number of tournaments in US Open Series in which a player has reached the quarterfinals or better, in Premier events; or the Round of 16 or better in Premier 5 events.

== Bonus Prize Money ==
Top three players in the 2013 US Open Series will receive bonus prize money, depending on where they finish in the 2013 US Open, according to money schedule below.

2013 Emirates Airline US Open Series Finish	2013 US Open Finish								Awardees	
2013 Emirates Airline US Open Series Finish	W	F	SF	QF	Round of 16	Round of 32	Round of 64	Round of 128	Awardees	
1st Place	$1,000,000	$500,000	$250,000	$125,000	$70,000	$40,000	$25,000	$15,000	(Spain) Rafael Nadal	$1,000,000
1st Place	$1,000,000	$500,000	$250,000	$125,000	$70,000	$40,000	$25,000	$15,000	(United States) Serena Williams	$1,000,000
2nd Place	$500,000	$250,000	$125,000	$62,500	$35,000	$20,000	$12,500	$7,500	(United States) John Isner	$20,000
2nd Place	$500,000	$250,000	$125,000	$62,500	$35,000	$20,000	$12,500	$7,500	(Belarus) Victoria Azarenka	$250,000
3rd Place	$250,000	$125,000	$62,500	$31,250	$17,500	$10,000	$6,250	$3,750	(Argentina) Juan Martín del Potro	$6,250
3rd Place	$250,000	$125,000	$62,500	$31,250	$17,500	$10,000	$6,250	$3,750	(Poland) Agnieszka Radwańska	$17,500

== 2013 schedule ==
Legend
Grand Slam Event
ATP Masters 1000 and WTA Premier 5
ATP World Tour 500 and WTA Premier
ATP World Tour 250 and WTA International

Week	Date	Men's Events	Women's Events
1	July 22 – July 28	Atlanta; BB&T Atlanta Open; 2013 Champion: (United States) John Isner	Stanford; Bank of the West Classic; 2013 Champion: (Slovakia) Dominika Cibulková
2	July 29 – August 4	Washington, D.C. Citi Open; 2013 Champion: (Argentina) Juan Martín del Potro	Carlsbad; Southern California Open; 2013 Champion: (Australia) Samantha Stosur
3	August 5 – August 11	Montreal; Rogers Cup presented by National Bank; 2013 Champion: (Spain) Rafael Nadal	Toronto; Rogers Cup presented by National Bank; 2013 Champion: (United States) Serena Williams
4	August 12 – August 18	Cincinnati; Western & Southern Open; 2013 Champion: (Spain) Rafael Nadal	Cincinnati; Western & Southern Open; 2013 Champion: (Belarus) Victoria Azarenka
5	August 19 – August 25	Winston-Salem; Winston-Salem Open; 2013 Champion: (Austria) Jürgen Melzer	New Haven; New Haven Open at Yale; 2013 Champion: (Romania) Simona Halep
6–7	August 26 – September 9	New York; US Open; 2013 Champion: (Spain) Rafael Nadal	New York; US Open; 2013 Champion: (United States) Serena Williams

== Week 1 ==
=== ATP – BB&T Atlanta Open ===
==== Main draw finals ====
Quarterfinals
1	(United States) J Isner	7^{7}	7^{7}
(United States) J Blake	6^{1}	6^{5}
3	(Croatia) I Dodig	6	0	3
7	(Australia) L Hewitt	1	6	6
(Colombia) S Giraldo	3	6	6^{2}
(United States) R Harrison	6	2	7^{7}
(Uzbekistan) D Istomin	3	6	3
2	(South Africa) K Anderson	6	3	6

Semifinals
1	(United States) John Isner	6	4	7^{7}
7	(Australia) Lleyton Hewitt	4	6	6^{5}
(United States) Ryan Harrison	3	6^{3}
2	(South Africa) Kevin Anderson	6	7^{7}

Final
1	(United States) John Isner	6^{3}	7^{7}	7^{7}
2	(South Africa) Kevin Anderson	7^{7}	6^{2}	6^{2}

=== WTA – Bank of the West Classic ===
==== Main draw finals ====
Quarterfinals
1	(Poland) Agnieszka Radwańska	7^{7}	3	6
6	(United States) Varvara Lepchenko	6^{2}	6	3
4	(United States) Jamie Hampton	6	6
Q	(Russia) Vera Dushevina	4	3
7	(Poland) Urszula Radwańska	5	3
3	(Slovakia) Dominika Cibulková	7	6
5	(Romania) Sorana Cîrstea	6	6
(Belarus) Olga Govortsova	3	2

Semifinals
1	(Poland) Agnieszka Radwańska	6	6
4	(United States) Jamie Hampton	3	2
3	(Slovakia) Dominika Cibulková	6	6
5	(Romania) Sorana Cîrstea	4	0

Final
1	(Poland) Agnieszka Radwańska	6	4	4
3	(Slovakia) Dominika Cibulková	3	6	6

== Week 2 ==
=== ATP – Citi Open ===
==== Main draw finals ====
Quarterfinals
1/WC	(Argentina) Juan Martín del Potro	7^{7}	6
7	(South Africa) Kevin Anderson	6^{0}	3
3	(Germany) Tommy Haas	7^{7}	7^{7}
11	(Bulgaria) Grigor Dimitrov	6^{5}	6^{3}
(Russia) Dmitry Tursunov	6	4	7^{7}
(Australia) Marinko Matosevic	3	6	6^{4}
8	(United States) John Isner	6^{5}	6	6
16	(Cyprus) Marcos Baghdatis	7^{7}	4	4

Semifinals
1/WC	(Argentina) Juan Martín del Potro	7^{7}	6
3	(Germany) Tommy Haas	6^{4}	3
(Russia) Dmitry Tursunov	7^{9}	3	4
8	(United States) John Isner	6^{7}	6	6

Final
1/WC	(Argentina) Juan Martín del Potro	3	6	6
8	(United States) John Isner	6	1	2

=== WTA – Southern California Open ===
==== Main draw finals ====
Quarterfinals
1	(Belarus) Victoria Azarenka	6	6
(Poland) Urszula Radwańska	1	2
4	(Italy) Roberta Vinci	1	7^{7}	2
7	(Serbia) Ana Ivanovic	6	6^{1}	6
WC	(France) Virginie Razzano	6^{8}	7	7^{10}
3	(Czech Republic) Petra Kvitová	7^{10}	5	6^{8}
5/WC	(Australia) Samantha Stosur	7	2	6
2	(Poland) Agnieszka Radwańska	5	6	3

Semifinals
1	(Belarus) Victoria Azarenka	6	4	6
7	(Serbia) Ana Ivanovic	0	6	3
WC	(France) Virginie Razzano	6^{2}	3
5/WC	(Australia) Samantha Stosur	7^{7}	6

Final
1	(Belarus) Victoria Azarenka	2	3
5/WC	(Australia) Samantha Stosur	6	6

== Week 3 ==
=== ATP – Rogers Cup (Montreal) ===
==== Main draw finals ====
Third Round
1	(Serbia) Novak Djokovic	2	6	6
(Uzbekistan) Denis Istomin	6	4	4
9	(Japan) Kei Nishikori	6	3	3
7	(France) Richard Gasquet	1	6	6
4	(Spain) Rafael Nadal	7^{8}	6
15	(Poland) Jerzy Janowicz	6^{6}	4
Q	(Australia) Marinko Matosevic	7^{9}	6^{10}	6
(France) Benoît Paire	6^{7}	7^{12}	3
5	(Czech Republic) Tomáš Berdych	5	6	6^{5}
WC	(Canada) Vasek Pospisil	7	2	7^{7}
(Russia) Nikolay Davydenko	6	6
Q	(Russia) Alex Bogomolov, Jr.	4	3
6	(Argentina) Juan Martín del Potro	5	4
11	(Canada) Milos Raonic	7	6
(Latvia) Ernests Gulbis	6	6
2	(United Kingdom) Andy Murray	4	3

Quarterfinals
1	(Serbia) Novak Djokovic	6	6
7	(France) Richard Gasquet	1	2
4	(Spain) Rafael Nadal	6	6
Q	(Australia) Marinko Matosevic	2	4
WC	(Canada) Vasek Pospisil	3
(Russia) Nikolay Davydenko	0^{r}
11	(Canada) Milos Raonic	7^{7}	4	6
(Latvia) Ernests Gulbis	6^{3}	6	4

Semifinals
1	(Serbia) Novak Djokovic	4	6	6^{2}
4	(Spain) Rafael Nadal	6	3	7^{7}
WC	(Canada) Vasek Pospisil	4	6	6^{4}
11	(Canada) Milos Raonic	6	1	7^{7}

Final
4	(Spain) Rafael Nadal	6	6
11	(Canada) Milos Raonic	2	2

=== WTA – Rogers Cup (Toronto) ===
==== Main draw finals ====
Third Round
1	(United States) Serena Williams	6	6
13	(Belgium) Kirsten Flipkens	0	3
(Slovakia) Magdaléna Rybáriková	7^{7}	1
7/WC	(France) Marion Bartoli	6^{5}	0^{r}
3	(Poland) Agnieszka Radwańska	6	7^{7}
14	(United States) Sloane Stephens	1	6^{2}
(France) Alizé Cornet	5	6^{3}
5	(Italy) Sara Errani	7	7^{7}
(Slovakia) Dominika Cibulková	6	7^{7}
10	(Italy) Roberta Vinci	3	6^{4}
16	(Serbia) Ana Ivanovic	6	1	6^{5}
4	(China) Li Na	3	6	7^{7}
6	(Czech Republic) Petra Kvitová	6	6
12	(Australia) Samantha Stosur	3	3
15	(Serbia) Jelena Janković	3	4
(Romania) Sorana Cîrstea	6	6

Quarterfinals
1	(United States) Serena Williams	6	6
(Slovakia) Magdaléna Rybáriková	1	1
3	(Poland) Agnieszka Radwańska	7^{7}	7
5	(Italy) Sara Errani	6^{1}	5
(Slovakia) Dominika Cibulková	6^{1}	2
4	(China) Li Na	7^{7}	6
6	(Czech Republic) Petra Kvitová	6	5	2
(Romania) Sorana Cîrstea	4	7	6

Semifinals
1	(United States) Serena Williams	7^{7}	6
3	(Poland) Agnieszka Radwańska	6^{3}	4
4	(China) Li Na	1	6^{5}
(Romania) Sorana Cîrstea	6	7^{7}

Final
1	(United States) Serena Williams	6	6
(Romania) Sorana Cîrstea	2	0

== Week 4 ==
=== ATP – Western & Southern Open ===
==== Main draw finals ====
Third Round
1	(Serbia) Novak Djokovic	6	6
Q	(Belgium) David Goffin	2	0
12	(Canada) Milos Raonic	6^{5}	4
(United States) John Isner	7^{7}	6
3	(Spain) David Ferrer	2	4
Q	(Russia) Dmitry Tursunov	6	6
(Spain) Feliciano López	4	6	4
7	(Argentina) Juan Martín del Potro	6	1	6
5	(Switzerland) Roger Federer	1	7	6
11	(Germany) Tommy Haas	6	5	3
(Bulgaria) Grigor Dimitrov	2	7	2
4	(Spain) Rafael Nadal	6	5	6
6	(Czech Republic) Tomáš Berdych	6	6
(Spain) Tommy Robredo	3	0
(France) Julien Benneteau	2	2
2	(United Kingdom) Andy Murray	6	6

Quarterfinals
1	(Serbia) Novak Djokovic	6^{5}	6	5
(United States) John Isner	7^{7}	3	7
Q	(Russia) Dmitry Tursunov	4	6	1
7	(Argentina) Juan Martín del Potro	6	3	6
5	(Switzerland) Roger Federer	7	4	3
4	(Spain) Rafael Nadal	5	6	6
6	(Czech Republic) Tomáš Berdych	6	6
2	(United Kingdom) Andy Murray	3	4

Semifinals
(United States) John Isner	6^{5}	7^{11}	6
7	(Argentina) Juan Martín del Potro	7^{7}	6^{9}	3
4	(Spain) Rafael Nadal	7	7^{7}
6	(Czech Republic) Tomáš Berdych	5	6^{4}

Final
(United States) John Isner	6^{8}	6^{3}
4	(Spain) Rafael Nadal	7^{10}	7^{7}

=== WTA – Western & Southern Open ===
==== Main draw finals ====
Third Round
1	(United States) Serena Williams	6	6
(Germany) Mona Barthel	4	1
11	(Australia) Samantha Stosur	4	6	2
(Romania) Simona Halep	6	4	6
4	(Poland) Agnieszka Radwańska	6	6
(Russia) Elena Vesnina	0	2
9	(Germany) Angelique Kerber	4	4
5	(China) Li Na	6	6
6	(Italy) Sara Errani	4	3
12	(Italy) Roberta Vinci	6	6
14	(Serbia) Jelena Janković	3	7	7
(United States) Sloane Stephens	6	5	5
7	(Czech Republic) Petra Kvitová	6	2	3
10	(Denmark) Caroline Wozniacki	3	6	6
(Slovakia) Magdaléna Rybáriková	3	4
2	(Belarus) Victoria Azarenka	6	6

Quarterfinals
1	(United States) Serena Williams	6	6
(Romania) Simona Halep	0	4
4	(Poland) Agnieszka Radwańska
5	(China) Li Na	w/o
12	(Italy) Roberta Vinci	0	4
14	(Serbia) Jelena Janković	6	6
10	(Denmark) Caroline Wozniacki	3	6^{5}
2	(Belarus) Victoria Azarenka	6	7^{7}

Semifinals
1	(United States) Serena Williams	7	7
5	(China) Li Na	5	5
14	(Serbia) Jelena Janković	6	2	3
2	(Belarus) Victoria Azarenka	4	6	6

Final
1	(United States) Serena Williams	6	2	6^{6}
2	(Belarus) Victoria Azarenka	2	6	7^{8}

== Week 5 ==
=== ATP – Winston-Salem Open ===
==== Main draw finals ====
Quarterfinals
(Lithuania) Ričardas Berankis	3	4
6	(United States) Sam Querrey	6	6
13	(Russia) Dmitry Tursunov	4	3
9	(Austria) Jürgen Melzer	6	6
7/WC	(Spain) Fernando Verdasco	7^{10}	4	4
15	(France) Gaël Monfils	6^{8}	6	6
10	(Ukraine) Alexandr Dolgopolov	7^{7}	6
(Chinese Taipei) Lu Yen-hsun	6^{2}	3

Semifinals
6	(United States) Sam Querrey	2	6	3
9	(Austria) Jürgen Melzer	6	4	6
15	(France) Gaël Monfils	7^{11}	6
10	(Ukraine) Alexandr Dolgopolov	6^{9}	3

Final
9	(Austria) Jürgen Melzer	6	2
15	(France) Gaël Monfils	3	1^{r}

=== WTA – New Haven Open at Yale ===
==== Main draw finals ====
Quarterfinals
(Russia) Ekaterina Makarova	1	6^{6}
(Romania) Simona Halep	6	7^{8}
4	(Denmark) Caroline Wozniacki	7^{8}	6
6/WC	(United States) Sloane Stephens	6^{6}	2
(Russia) Anastasia Pavlyuchenkova	6	2	5
3	(Czech Republic) Petra Kvitová	2	6	7
(Czech Republic) Klára Zakopalová	4	6	6
(Russia) Elena Vesnina	6	0	4

Semifinals
(Romania) Simona Halep	6	7
4	(Denmark) Caroline Wozniacki	2	5
3	(Czech Republic) Petra Kvitová	6	6
(Czech Republic) Klára Zakopalová	0	1

Final
(Romania) Simona Halep	6	6
3	(Czech Republic) Petra Kvitová	2	2
