= 2013 WTA Tour Championships – Singles =

Singles
- 2013 WTA Tour Championships

Final
- Champion: (United States) Serena Williams
- Runner-up: (China) Li Na
- Score: 2–6, 6–3, 6–0

Details
- Draw: 8 (RR + elimination)
- Seeds: 8

Events
Singles	Doubles
- WTA Tour Championships

Defending champion Serena Williams defeated Li Na in the final, 2–6, 6–3, 6–0 to win the singles tennis title at the 2013 WTA Tour Championships. It was her record 11th title of the season, and her fourth Tour Finals singles title.

== Players ==
1. (United States) Serena Williams (champion)
2. (Belarus) Victoria Azarenka (round robin)
3. (Poland) Agnieszka Radwańska (round robin)
4. (China) Li Na (final)
5. (Czech Republic) Petra Kvitová (semifinals)
6. (Italy) Sara Errani (round robin)
7. (Serbia) Jelena Janković (semifinals)
8. (Germany) Angelique Kerber (round robin)

Notes:

- (Russia) Maria Sharapova had qualified but withdrew due to a right shoulder injury

== Alternates ==
1. (Denmark) Caroline Wozniacki (Not used)
2. (United States) Sloane Stephens (Not used)

== Draw ==
Key

- Q = Qualifier
- WC = Wild card
- LL = Lucky loser
- Alt = Alternate
- ITF = ITF entry
- PR = Protected ranking
- SR = Special ranking
- SE = Special exempt
- JE = Junior exempt
- JR = Junior Accelerator Programme entrant
- CO = College Accelerator Programme entrant
- NG = Next Gen Accelerator Program entrant
- w/o = Walkover
- r = Retired
- d = Defaulted

=== Finals ===
Semifinals
1	(United States) Serena Williams	6	2	6
7	(Serbia) Jelena Janković	4	6	4
4	(China) Li Na	6	6
5	(Czech Republic) Petra Kvitová	4	2

Final
1	(United States) Serena Williams	2	6	6
4	(China) Li Na	6	3	0

=== Red group ===
		(United States) Williams	(Poland) Radwańska	(Czech Republic) Kvitová	(Germany) Kerber	RR W–L	Set W–L	Game W–L	Standings
1	(United States) Serena Williams		6–2, 6–4	6–2, 6–3	6–3, 6–1	3–0	6–0 (100%)	36–15 (70.6%)	1
3	(Poland) Agnieszka Radwańska	2–6, 4–6		4–6, 4–6	2–6, 2–6	0–3	0–6 (0%)	18–36 (33.3%)	4
5	(Czech Republic) Petra Kvitová	2–6, 3–6	6–4, 6–4		6–7^{(3–7)}, 6–2, 6–3	2–1	4–3 (57.1%)	35–32 (52.2%)	2
8	(Germany) Angelique Kerber	3–6, 1–6	6–2, 6–2	7–6^{(7–3)}, 2–6, 3–6		1–2	3–4 (42.9%)	28–34 (45.2%)	3

=== White group ===
		(Belarus) Azarenka	(China) Li	(Italy) Errani	(Serbia) Janković	RR W–L	Set W–L	Game W–L	Standings
2	(Belarus) Victoria Azarenka		2–6, 1–6	7–6^{(7–4)}, 6–2	4–6, 3–6	1–2	2–4 (33.3%)	23–32 (41.8%)	3
4	(China) Li Na	6–2, 6–1		6–3, 7–6^{(7–5)}	6–3, 2–6, 6–3	3–0	6–1 (85.7%)	39–24 (61.9%)	1
6	(Italy) Sara Errani	6–7^{(4–7)}, 2–6	3–6, 6–7^{(5–7)}		6–4, 6–4	1–2	2–4 (33.3%)	29–34 (46.0%)	4
7	(Serbia) Jelena Janković	6–4, 6–3	3–6, 6–2, 3–6	4–6, 4–6		1–2	3–4 (42.9%)	32–33 (49.2%)	2
