= 2013 Rogers Cup – Women's doubles =

Women's doubles
- 2013 Rogers Cup

Final
- Champions: (Serbia) Jelena Janković (Slovenia) Katarina Srebotnik
- Runners-up: (Germany) Anna-Lena Grönefeld (Czech Republic) Květa Peschke
- Score: 5–7, 6–2, [10–6]

Details
- Draw: 28
- Seeds: 8

Events
Singles	men	women
Doubles	men	women
- Rogers Cup

Klaudia Jans-Ignacik and Kristina Mladenovic were the defending champions, but Jans-Ignacik could not participate on account of becoming a mother in early 2013. Mladenovic played alongside Galina Voskoboeva, but lost in the first round to Julia Görges and Barbora Záhlavová-Strýcová.

== Seeds ==
The top four seeds receive a bye into the second round.

1. (Italy) Sara Errani / (Italy) Roberta Vinci (quarterfinals)
2. (Russia) Ekaterina Makarova / (Russia) Elena Vesnina (semifinals)
3. (Germany) Anna-Lena Grönefeld / (Czech Republic) Květa Peschke (final)
4. (United States) Raquel Kops-Jones / (United States) Abigail Spears (quarterfinals)
5. (India) Sania Mirza / (China) Zheng Jie (second round)
6. (United States) Liezel Huber / (Spain) Nuria Llagostera Vives (second round)
7. (France) Kristina Mladenovic / (Kazakhstan) Galina Voskoboeva (first round)
8. (Russia) Anastasia Pavlyuchenkova / (Czech Republic) Lucie Šafářová (first round)

== Draw ==
Key

- Q = Qualifier
- WC = Wild card
- LL = Lucky loser
- Alt = Alternate
- ITF = ITF entry
- PR = Protected ranking
- SR = Special ranking
- SE = Special exempt
- JE = Junior exempt
- JR = Junior Accelerator Programme entrant
- CO = College Accelerator Programme entrant
- NG = Next Gen Accelerator Program entrant
- w/o = Walkover
- r = Retired
- d = Defaulted

=== Finals ===
Semifinals
WC	(Canada) Gabriela Dabrowski (Canada) Sharon Fichman	5	3
(Serbia) Jelena Janković (Slovenia) Katarina Srebotnik	7	6
3	(Germany) Anna-Lena Grönefeld (Czech Republic) Květa Peschke	6	6
2	(Russia) Ekaterina Makarova (Russia) Elena Vesnina	2	4

Final
(Serbia) Jelena Janković (Slovenia) Katarina Srebotnik	5	6	[10]
3	(Germany) Anna-Lena Grönefeld (Czech Republic) Květa Peschke	7	2	[6]

=== Top half ===
First round
(United States) V King (Russia) A Kleybanova	4	6	[7]
(Hungary) K Marosi (United States) M Moulton-Levy	6	1	[10]
(Japan) K Date-Krumm (South Africa) C Scheepers	6	3	[9]
Alt	(Austria) S Klemenschits (Ukraine) O Savchuk	2	6	[11]
WC	(Canada) G Dabrowski (Canada) S Fichman	6	6^{5}	[10]
8	(Russia) A Pavlyuchenkova (Czech Republic) L Šafářová	4	7^{7}	[8]
(Chinese Taipei) H-c Chan (Czech Republic) E Hrdinová	6	6
(Slovenia) A Klepač (United States) V Lepchenko	2	3
(Serbia) J Janković (Slovenia) K Srebotnik	6^{5}	6	[10]
(Slovakia) D Cibulková (Chinese Taipei) S-w Hsieh	7^{7}	1	[2]
(Russia) S Kuznetsova (Italy) F Pennetta	6^{2}	6^{6}
6	(United States) L Huber (Spain) N Llagostera Vives	7^{7}	7^{8}

Second round
1	(Italy) S Errani (Italy) R Vinci	6	3	[10]
(Hungary) K Marosi (United States) M Moulton-Levy	4	6	[5]
Alt	(Austria) S Klemenschits (Ukraine) O Savchuk	7^{7}	4	[5]
WC	(Canada) G Dabrowski (Canada) S Fichman	6^{4}	6	[10]
4	(United States) R Kops-Jones (United States) A Spears	6	6
(Chinese Taipei) H-c Chan (Czech Republic) E Hrdinová	4	2
(Serbia) J Janković (Slovenia) K Srebotnik	6	6
6	(United States) L Huber (Spain) N Llagostera Vives	4	1

Quarterfinals
1	(Italy) S Errani (Italy) R Vinci	7^{7}	2	5
WC	(Canada) G Dabrowski (Canada) S Fichman	6^{4}	6	[10]
4	(United States) R Kops-Jones (United States) A Spears	2	4
(Serbia) J Janković (Slovenia) K Srebotnik	6	6

Semifinals
WC	(Canada) G Dabrowski (Canada) S Fichman	5	3
(Serbia) J Janković (Slovenia) K Srebotnik	7	6

=== Bottom half ===
First round
7	(France) K Mladenovic (Kazakhstan) G Voskoboeva	5	4
(Germany) J Görges (Czech Republic) B Záhlavová-Strýcová	7	6
WC	(Germany) A Kerber (Czech Republic) P Kvitová	4	2
WC	(Slovakia) D Hantuchová (Switzerland) M Hingis	6	6
(Romania) I-C Begu (Belarus) O Govortsova	6	2	[10]
(Spain) S Soler Espinosa (Czech Republic) K Zakopalová	4	6	[5]
5	(India) S Mirza (China) J Zheng	4	7^{7}	[10]
(South Africa) N Grandin (Croatia) D Jurak	6	6^{5}	[2]
(Georgia (country)) O Kalashnikova (Poland) A Rosolska	4	6	[10]
WC	(Canada) E Bouchard (Belgium) K Flipkens	6	3	[7]
(Russia) A Kudryavtseva (Australia) A Rodionova	4	6	[10]
(Slovakia) J Husárová (Croatia) P Martić	6	4	[5]

Second round
(Germany) J Görges (Czech Republic) B Záhlavová-Strýcová	6	6
WC	(Slovakia) D Hantuchová (Switzerland) M Hingis	2	4
(Romania) I-C Begu (Belarus) O Govortsova	2	1
3	(Germany) A-L Grönefeld (Czech Republic) K Peschke	6	6
5	(India) S Mirza (China) J Zheng	6	1	[6]
(Georgia (country)) O Kalashnikova (Poland) A Rosolska	3	6	[10]
(Russia) A Kudryavtseva (Australia) A Rodionova	4	4
2	(Russia) E Makarova (Russia) E Vesnina	6	6

Quarterfinals
(Germany) J Görges (Czech Republic) B Záhlavová-Strýcová	5	2
3	(Germany) A-L Grönefeld (Czech Republic) K Peschke	7	6
(Georgia (country)) O Kalashnikova (Poland) A Rosolska	4	2
2	(Russia) E Makarova (Russia) E Vesnina	6	6

Semifinals
3	(Germany) A-L Grönefeld (Czech Republic) K Peschke	6	6
2	(Russia) E Makarova (Russia) E Vesnina	2	4
