= 2013 Rogers Cup – Men's doubles =

Men's doubles
- 2013 Rogers Cup

Final
- Champions: (Austria) Alexander Peya (Brazil) Bruno Soares
- Runners-up: (United Kingdom) Colin Fleming (United Kingdom) Andy Murray
- Score: 6–4, 7–6^{(7–4)}

Details
- Draw: 28
- Seeds: 8

Events
Singles	men	women
Doubles	men	women
- Rogers Cup

Bob Bryan and Mike Bryan were the defending champions, but lost to Robert Lindstedt and Daniel Nestor in the quarterfinals.

== Seeds ==
All seeds receive a bye into the second round.

1. (United States) Bob Bryan / (United States) Mike Bryan (quarterfinals)
2. (Spain) Marcel Granollers / (Spain) Marc López (quarterfinals)
3. (Austria) Alexander Peya / (Brazil) Bruno Soares (champions)
4. (India) Leander Paes / (Czech Republic) Radek Štěpánek (second round)
5. (Pakistan) Aisam-ul-Haq Qureshi / (Netherlands) Jean-Julien Rojer (quarterfinals)
6. (Sweden) Robert Lindstedt / (Canada) Daniel Nestor (semifinals)
7. (Croatia) Ivan Dodig / (Brazil) Marcelo Melo (quarterfinals)
8. (Belarus) Max Mirnyi / (Romania) Horia Tecău (second round)

== Draw ==
Key

- Q = Qualifier
- WC = Wild card
- LL = Lucky loser
- Alt = Alternate
- ITF = ITF entry
- PR = Protected ranking
- SR = Special ranking
- SE = Special exempt
- JE = Junior exempt
- JR = Junior Accelerator Programme entrant
- CO = College Accelerator Programme entrant
- NG = Next Gen Accelerator Program entrant
- w/o = Walkover
- r = Retired
- d = Defaulted

=== Finals ===
Semifinals
6	(Sweden) Robert Lindstedt (Canada) Daniel Nestor	3	0
(United Kingdom) Colin Fleming (United Kingdom) Andy Murray	6	6
3	(Austria) Alexander Peya (Brazil) Bruno Soares	6	7^{7}
(Poland) Mariusz Fyrstenberg (Poland) Marcin Matkowski	2	6^{3}

Final
(United Kingdom) Colin Fleming (United Kingdom) Andy Murray	4	6^{4}
3	(Austria) Alexander Peya (Brazil) Bruno Soares	6	7^{7}

=== Top half ===
First round
(Italy) A Seppi (Russia) M Youzhny	6	6
Alt	(France) J Chardy (Poland) Ł Kubot	4	3
(United Kingdom) D Inglot (Poland) J Janowicz	7^{7}	6
(Germany) A Begemann (India) R Bopanna	6^{4}	4
(France) J Benneteau (Serbia) N Zimonjić	6	4	[6]
(United Kingdom) C Fleming (United Kingdom) A Murray	1	6	[10]
(Spain) P Andújar (Spain) R Nadal	6^{2}	6	[12]
(Spain) D Ferrer (Spain) F López	7^{7}	1	[10]

Second round
1	(United States) B Bryan (United States) M Bryan	6	6
(Italy) A Seppi (Russia) M Youzhny	3	4
(United Kingdom) D Inglot (Poland) J Janowicz	3	4
6	(Sweden) R Lindstedt (Canada) D Nestor	6	6
4	(India) L Paes (Czech Republic) R Štěpánek	3	3
(United Kingdom) C Fleming (United Kingdom) A Murray	6	6
(Spain) P Andújar (Spain) R Nadal
5	(Pakistan) A-u-H Qureshi (Netherlands) J-J Rojer	w/o

Quarterfinals
1	(United States) B Bryan (United States) M Bryan	7^{7}	3	[5]
6	(Sweden) R Lindstedt (Canada) D Nestor	6^{2}	6	[10]
(United Kingdom) C Fleming (United Kingdom) A Murray	6	7^{7}
5	(Pakistan) A-u-H Qureshi (Netherlands) J-J Rojer	3	6^{3}

Semifinals
6	(Sweden) R Lindstedt (Canada) D Nestor	3	0
(United Kingdom) C Fleming (United Kingdom) A Murray	6	6

=== Bottom half ===
First round
(Ukraine) A Dolgopolov (Italy) F Fognini	7^{7}	4	[5]
(Germany) T Haas (Austria) J Melzer	6^{2}	6	[10]
(Czech Republic) T Berdych (France) M Llodra	6	6
(Slovakia) M Kližan (Serbia) J Tipsarević	2	3
(France) B Paire (Switzerland) S Wawrinka	6^{6}	2
(Poland) M Fyrstenberg (Poland) M Matkowski	7^{8}	6
(Bulgaria) G Dimitrov (Germany) P Kohlschreiber	7^{8}	6
WC	(Canada) F Dancevic (Canada) A Shamasdin	6^{6}	3

Second round
7	(Croatia) I Dodig (Brazil) M Melo	w/o
(Germany) T Haas (Austria) J Melzer
(Czech Republic) T Berdych (France) M Llodra	6	6^{4}	[6]
3	(Austria) A Peya (Brazil) B Soares	3	7^{7}	[10]
8	(Belarus) M Mirnyi (Romania) H Tecău	2	6	[10]
(Poland) M Fyrstenberg (Poland) M Matkowski	6	4	[12]
(Bulgaria) G Dimitrov (Germany) P Kohlschreiber	3	2
2	(Spain) M Granollers (Spain) M López	6	6

Quarterfinals
7	(Croatia) I Dodig (Brazil) M Melo	6	5	[1]
3	(Austria) A Peya (Brazil) B Soares	4	7	[10]
(Poland) M Fyrstenberg (Poland) M Matkowski	7	4	[10]
2	(Spain) M Granollers (Spain) M López	5	6	[7]

Semifinals
3	(Austria) A Peya (Brazil) B Soares	6	7^{7}
(Poland) M Fyrstenberg (Poland) M Matkowski	2	6^{3}
