= 2013 Rogers Cup – Men's singles =

Men's singles
- 2013 Rogers Cup

Final
- Champion: (Spain) Rafael Nadal
- Runner-up: (Canada) Milos Raonic
- Score: 6–2, 6–2

Events
Singles	men	women
Doubles	men	women
← 2012 ·	Rogers Cup	· 2014 →

Rafael Nadal defeated Milos Raonic in the final, 6–2, 6–2 to win the men's singles tennis title at the 2013 Canadian Open.

Novak Djokovic was the two-time defending champion, but lost in the semifinals to Nadal.

For the first time since 1992, five Canadians reached the second round or better. Raonic and Vasek Pospisil both reached the semifinals where they played against each other, with Raonic becoming the first home finalist since Robert Bédard won the title in 1958.

== Seeds ==
The top eight seeds receive a bye into the second round.

1. (Serbia) Novak Djokovic (semifinals)
2. (United Kingdom) Andy Murray (third round)
3. (Spain) David Ferrer (second round)
4. (Spain) Rafael Nadal (champion)
5. (Czech Republic) Tomáš Berdych (third round)
6. (Argentina) Juan Martín del Potro (third round)
7. (France) Richard Gasquet (quarterfinals)
8. (Switzerland) Stanislas Wawrinka (second round)
9. (Japan) Kei Nishikori (third round)
10. (Germany) Tommy Haas (second round, retired)
11. (Canada) Milos Raonic (final)
12. (Spain) Nicolás Almagro (first round)
13. (Italy) Fabio Fognini (second round)
14. (France) Gilles Simon (first round)
15. (Poland) Jerzy Janowicz (third round)
16. (Serbia) Janko Tipsarević (first round)

== Draw ==
=== Key ===
- Q = Qualifier
- WC = Wild card
- LL = Lucky loser
- Alt = Alternate
- SE = Special exempt
- PR = Protected ranking
- ITF = ITF entry
- JE = Junior exempt
- w/o = Walkover
- r = Retired
- d = Defaulted
- SR = Special ranking

=== Finals ===
Quarterfinals
1	(Serbia) Novak Djokovic	6	6
7	(France) Richard Gasquet	1	2
4	(Spain) Rafael Nadal	6	6
Q	(Australia) Marinko Matosevic	2	4
WC	(Canada) Vasek Pospisil	3
(Russia) Nikolay Davydenko	0^{r}
11	(Canada) Milos Raonic	7^{7}	4	6
(Latvia) Ernests Gulbis	6^{3}	6	4

Semifinals
1	(Serbia) Novak Djokovic	4	6	6^{2}
4	(Spain) Rafael Nadal	6	3	7^{7}
WC	(Canada) Vasek Pospisil	4	6	6^{4}
11	(Canada) Milos Raonic	6	1	7^{7}

Final
4	(Spain) Rafael Nadal	6	6
11	(Canada) Milos Raonic	2	2

=== Top half ===
==== Section 1 ====
First round
(Australia) B Tomic	7	3	3
(Germany) F Mayer	5	6	6
(Finland) J Nieminen	6	5	1^{r}
WC	(Canada) F Peliwo	3	7	3
(Uzbekistan) D Istomin	6	6
16	(Serbia) J Tipsarević	4	3
9	(Japan) K Nishikori	4	6	6
Q	(Canada) P Polansky	6	4	2
(Italy) A Seppi	6	4	7^{7}
(Czech Republic) L Rosol	4	6	6^{4}
(Slovakia) M Kližan	5	6	7^{8}
(Brazil) T Bellucci	7	4	6^{6}

Second round
1	(Serbia) N Djokovic	6	6
(Germany) F Mayer	2	1
WC	(Canada) F Peliwo	3	6	3
(Uzbekistan) D Istomin	6	3	6
9	(Japan) K Nishikori	4	7	6
(Italy) A Seppi	6	5	1
(Slovakia) M Kližan	3	2
7	(France) R Gasquet	6	6

Third round
1	(Serbia) N Djokovic	2	6	6
(Uzbekistan) D Istomin	6	4	4
9	(Japan) K Nishikori	6	3	3
7	(France) R Gasquet	1	6	6

Quarterfinals
1	(Serbia) N Djokovic	6	6
7	(France) R Gasquet	1	2

==== Section 2 ====
First round
WC	(Canada) J Levine	6	7^{7}
(Belgium) X Malisse	4	6^{4}
WC	(Canada) F Dancevic	5	7^{8}	6
Q	(Chinese Taipei) Y-h Lu	7	6^{6}	1
(France) J Benneteau	6	3	5
15	(Poland) J Janowicz	3	6	7
10	(Germany) T Haas	7^{7}	6
Q	(Belgium) D Goffin	6^{4}	3
Q	(Australia) M Matosevic	6	6
Q	(Germany) B Becker	2	3
(Germany) P Kohlschreiber	6^{1}	5
(France) B Paire	7^{7}	7

Second round
4	(Spain) R Nadal	6	6
WC	(Canada) J Levine	2	0
WC	(Canada) F Dancevic	6^{5}	6	4
15	(Poland) J Janowicz	7^{7}	3	6
10	(Germany) T Haas	0^{r}
Q	(Australia) M Matosevic	5
(France) B Paire	6	7^{7}
8	(Switzerland) S Wawrinka	2	6^{2}

Third round
4	(Spain) R Nadal	7^{8}	6
15	(Poland) J Janowicz	6^{6}	4
Q	(Australia) M Matosevic	7^{9}	6^{10}	6
(France) B Paire	6^{7}	7^{12}	3

Quarterfinals
4	(Spain) R Nadal	6	6
Q	(Australia) M Matosevic	2	4

=== Bottom half ===
==== Section 3 ====
First round
(South Africa) K Anderson	6^{0}	4
(Ukraine) A Dolgopolov	7^{7}	6
WC	(Canada) V Pospisil	5	7^{7}	7^{7}
(United States) J Isner	7	6^{5}	6^{4}
(Czech Republic) R Štěpánek	6	6^{4}	6
12	(Spain) N Almagro	3	7^{7}	3
14	(France) G Simon	6	1	1
(Russia) N Davydenko	2	6	6
(Spain) P Andújar	6	7^{7}
Q	(Israel) A Weintraub	1	6^{5}
Q	(Russia) A Bogomolov Jr.	6	4	6
(France) M Llodra	2	6	3

Second round
5	(Czech Republic) T Berdych	6	6
(Ukraine) A Dolgopolov	3	4
WC	(Canada) V Pospisil	6	6
(Czech Republic) R Štěpánek	2	4
(Russia) N Davydenko	6	4	6
(Spain) P Andújar	1	6	3
Q	(Russia) A Bogomolov Jr.	6	6
3	(Spain) D Ferrer	2	4

Third round
5	(Czech Republic) T Berdych	5	6	6^{5}
WC	(Canada) V Pospisil	7	2	7^{7}
(Russia) N Davydenko	6	6
Q	(Russia) A Bogomolov Jr.	4	3

Quarterfinals
WC	(Canada) V Pospisil	3
(Russia) N Davydenko	0^{r}

==== Section 4 ====
First round
(Slovenia) G Žemlja	1	1
(Croatia) I Dodig	6	6
(Russia) M Youzhny	6	7^{7}
(Austria) J Melzer	4	6^{3}
(France) J Chardy	3	6	5
11	(Canada) M Raonic	6	4	7
13	(Italy) F Fognini	1	6	6
(Cyprus) M Baghdatis	6	1	1
(Latvia) E Gulbis	7^{7}	6
(Spain) F López	6^{4}	4
(Bulgaria) G Dimitrov	4	4
(Spain) M Granollers	6	6

Second round
6	(Argentina) JM del Potro	6	4	7
(Croatia) I Dodig	4	6	5
(Russia) M Youzhny	4	4
11	(Canada) M Raonic	6	6
13	(Italy) F Fognini	3	6	1
(Latvia) E Gulbis	6	1	6
(Spain) M Granollers	4	6^{2}
2	(United Kingdom) A Murray	6	7^{7}

Third round
6	(Argentina) JM del Potro	5	4
11	(Canada) M Raonic	7	6
(Latvia) E Gulbis	6	6
2	(United Kingdom) A Murray	4	3

Quarterfinals
11	(Canada) M Raonic	7^{7}	4	6
(Latvia) E Gulbis	6^{3}	6	4

== Qualifying ==
=== Seeds ===
1. (Chinese Taipei) Lu Yen-hsun (qualified)
2. (France) Adrian Mannarino (qualifying competition)
3. (Poland) Łukasz Kubot (qualifying competition)
4. (Spain) Albert Ramos (first round)
5. (Germany) Tobias Kamke (qualifying competition)
6. (Russia) Alex Bogomolov Jr. (qualified)
7. (Australia) Marinko Matosevic (qualified)
8. (Slovakia) Lukáš Lacko (first round)
9. (Belgium) David Goffin (qualified)
10. (Croatia) Ivo Karlović (qualifying competition)
11. (United States) Michael Russell (qualifying competition)
12. (United States) Jack Sock (qualifying competition)
13. (Germany) Benjamin Becker (qualified)
14. (United States) Denis Kudla (qualifying competition)

=== Qualifiers ===
1. (Chinese Taipei) Lu Yen-hsun
2. (Germany) Benjamin Becker
3. (Canada) Peter Polansky
4. (Israel) Amir Weintraub
5. (Belgium) David Goffin
6. (Russia) Alex Bogomolov Jr.
7. (Australia) Marinko Matosevic

=== Qualifying draw ===
==== First qualifier ====
First round
1	(Chinese Taipei) Lu Yen-hsun	6	6
(Lithuania) Ričardas Berankis	1	2
(United States) Rajeev Ram	6^{7}	4
14	(United States) Denis Kudla	7^{9}	6

Qualifying competition
1	(Chinese Taipei) Lu Yen-hsun	7	6
14	(United States) Denis Kudla	5	3

==== Second qualifier ====
First round
2	(France) Adrian Mannarino	6	6
(Australia) Matthew Ebden	2	0
(Chinese Taipei) Chen Ti	6	4	3
13	(Germany) Benjamin Becker	1	6	6

Qualifying competition
2	(France) Adrian Mannarino	6	6^{5}	5
13	(Germany) Benjamin Becker	3	7^{7}	7

==== Third qualifier ====
First round
3	(Poland) Łukasz Kubot	6	7
WC	(Canada) Érik Chvojka	4	5
WC	(Canada) Peter Polansky	6	6
8	(Slovakia) Lukáš Lacko	4	4

Qualifying competition
3	(Poland) Łukasz Kubot	2	4
WC	(Canada) Peter Polansky	6	6

==== Fourth qualifier ====
First round
4	(Spain) Albert Ramos	4	6	4
(Israel) Amir Weintraub	6	3	6
(Russia) Teymuraz Gabashvili	6^{8}	5
10	(Croatia) Ivo Karlović	7^{10}	7

Qualifying competition
(Israel) Amir Weintraub	7	7^{7}
10	(Croatia) Ivo Karlović	5	6^{2}

==== Fifth qualifier ====
First round
5	(Germany) Tobias Kamke	6	6
WC	(Canada) Philip Bester	2	2
(Ukraine) Illya Marchenko	6	3	4
9	(Belgium) David Goffin	4	6	6

Qualifying competition
5	(Germany) Tobias Kamke	4	5
9	(Belgium) David Goffin	6	7

==== Sixth qualifier ====
First round
6	(Russia) Alex Bogomolov Jr.	6	6
WC	(Canada) Tommy Mylnikov	2	0
(Canada) Steven Diez	1	2
11	(United States) Michael Russell	6	6

Qualifying competition
6	(Russia) Alex Bogomolov Jr.	5	6	6
11	(United States) Michael Russell	7	2	4

==== Seventh qualifier ====
First round
7	(Australia) Marinko Matosevic	6	7
(South Africa) Rik de Voest	4	5
(United States) Tim Smyczek	2	6	3
12	(United States) Jack Sock	6	3	6

Qualifying competition
7	(Australia) Marinko Matosevic	2	6	6
12	(United States) Jack Sock	6	4	3
