= 2013 WTA Tour Championships – Doubles =

Doubles
- 2013 WTA Tour Championships

Final
- Champions: (Chinese Taipei) Hsieh Su-wei (China) Peng Shuai
- Runners-up: (Russia) Ekaterina Makarova (Russia) Elena Vesnina
- Score: 6–4, 7–5

Details
- Draw: 4
- Seeds: 4

Events
| Singles | Doubles |
- WTA Tour Championships

Hsieh Su-wei and Peng Shuai defeated Ekaterina Makarova and Elena Vesnina in the final, 6–4, 7–5 to win the doubles tennis title at the 2013 WTA Tour Championships.

Maria Kirilenko and Nadia Petrova were the reigning champions, but played separately this year. Kirilenko did not qualify; Petrova qualified partnering Katarina Srebotnik, but lost in the semifinals to Hsieh and Peng.

== Seeds ==
1. (Italy) Sara Errani / (Italy) Roberta Vinci (semifinals)
2. (Chinese Taipei) Hsieh Su-wei / (China) Peng Shuai (champions)
3. (Russia) Nadia Petrova / (Slovenia) Katarina Srebotnik (semifinals)
4. (Russia) Ekaterina Makarova / (Russia) Elena Vesnina (final)

== Draw ==
Key

- Q = Qualifier
- WC = Wild card
- LL = Lucky loser
- Alt = Alternate
- ITF = ITF entry
- PR = Protected ranking
- SR = Special ranking
- SE = Special exempt
- JE = Junior exempt
- JR = Junior Accelerator Programme entrant
- CO = College Accelerator Programme entrant
- NG = Next Gen Accelerator Program entrant
- w/o = Walkover
- r = Retired
- d = Defaulted

=== Finals ===
Semifinals
1 | (Italy) Sara Errani (Italy) Roberta Vinci | 6 | 5 | [3]
4 | (Russia) Ekaterina Makarova (Russia) Elena Vesnina | 4 | 7 | [10]
3 | (Russia) Nadia Petrova (Slovenia) Katarina Srebotnik | 6^{5} | 2
2 | (Chinese Taipei) Hsieh Su-wei (China) Peng Shuai | 7^{7} | 6

Final
4 | (Russia) Ekaterina Makarova (Russia) Elena Vesnina | 4 | 5
2 | (Chinese Taipei) Hsieh Su-wei (China) Peng Shuai | 6 | 7
