= 2013 Rogers Cup – Women's singles =

Women's singles
- 2013 Rogers Cup

Final
- Champion: (United States) Serena Williams
- Runner-up: (Romania) Sorana Cîrstea
- Score: 6–2, 6–0

Details
- Draw: 56
- Seeds: 16

Events
Singles	men	women
Doubles	men	women
- Rogers Cup

Serena Williams defeated Sorana Cîrstea in the final, 6–2, 6–0 to win the women's singles tennis title at the 2013 Canadian Open. It was her third Canadian Open title, eighth title of the season, and 54th career WTA Tour-level singles title.

Petra Kvitová was the defending champion, but lost to Cîrstea in the quarterfinals.

== Seeds ==
The top eight seeds receive a bye into the second round.

1. (United States) Serena Williams (champion)
2. (Belarus) Victoria Azarenka (withdrew because of a lower back injury)
3. (Poland) Agnieszka Radwańska (semifinals)
4. (China) Li Na (semifinals)
5. (Italy) Sara Errani (quarterfinals)
6. (Czech Republic) Petra Kvitová (quarterfinals)
7. (France) Marion Bartoli (third round, retired)
8. (Germany) Angelique Kerber (second round)
9. (Denmark) Caroline Wozniacki (second round)
10. (Italy) Roberta Vinci (third round)
11. (Russia) Maria Kirilenko (second round)
12. (Australia) Samantha Stosur (third round)
13. (Belgium) Kirsten Flipkens (third round)
14. (United States) Sloane Stephens (third round)
15. (Serbia) Jelena Janković (third round)
16. (Serbia) Ana Ivanovic (third round)

== Draw ==
Key

- Q = Qualifier
- WC = Wild card
- LL = Lucky loser
- Alt = Alternate
- ITF = ITF entry
- PR = Protected ranking
- SR = Special ranking
- SE = Special exempt
- JE = Junior exempt
- JR = Junior Accelerator Programme entrant
- CO = College Accelerator Programme entrant
- NG = Next Gen Accelerator Program entrant
- w/o = Walkover
- r = Retired
- d = Defaulted

=== Finals ===
Quarterfinals
1	(United States) Serena Williams	6	6
(Slovakia) Magdaléna Rybáriková	1	1
3	(Poland) Agnieszka Radwańska	7^{7}	7
5	(Italy) Sara Errani	6^{1}	5
(Slovakia) Dominika Cibulková	6^{1}	2
4	(China) Li Na	7^{7}	6
6	(Czech Republic) Petra Kvitová	6	5	2
(Romania) Sorana Cîrstea	4	7	6

Semifinals
1	(United States) Serena Williams	7^{7}	6
3	(Poland) Agnieszka Radwańska	6^{3}	4
4	(China) Li Na	1	6^{5}
(Romania) Sorana Cîrstea	6	7^{7}

Final
1	(United States) Serena Williams	6	6
(Romania) Sorana Cîrstea	2	0

=== Top half ===
==== Section 1 ====
First round
Q	(South Africa) C Scheepers	6	3	3
(Italy) F Schiavone	2	6	6
Q	(United States) A Riske	4	6	3
Q	(Netherlands) K Bertens	6	1	6
(United States) V Williams	6	4	2
13	(Belgium) K Flipkens	0	6	6
LL	(Japan) A Morita	3	1
(United States) V Lepchenko	6	6
(Slovakia) M Rybáriková	6	6
Q	(Romania) A Dulgheru	4	3
LL	(Russia) S Kuznetsova	6	5	5
Q	(United States) L Davis	3	7	7

Second round
1	(United States) S Williams	6	6
(Italy) F Schiavone	3	2
Q	(Netherlands) K Bertens	5	6	2
13	(Belgium) K Flipkens	7	3	6
(United States) V Lepchenko	4	2
(Slovakia) M Rybáriková	6	6
Q	(United States) L Davis	0	3
7/WC	(France) M Bartoli	6	6

Third round
1	(United States) S Williams	6	6
13	(Belgium) K Flipkens	0	3
(Slovakia) M Rybáriková	7^{7}	1
7/WC	(France) M Bartoli	6^{5}	0^{r}

Quarterfinals
1	(United States) S Williams	6	6
(Slovakia) M Rybáriková	1	1

==== Section 2 ====
First round
(Belgium) Y Wickmayer	6	2	6
LL	(United States) B Mattek-Sands	4	6	4
(China) J Zheng	7^{7}	3	6^{1}
(Germany) M Barthel	6^{3}	6	7^{7}
(France) K Mladenovic	2	6^{5}
14	(United States) S Stephens	6	7^{7}
11	(Russia) M Kirilenko	6	6
Q	(Croatia) P Martić	2	1
(France) A Cornet	6	6
(Russia) E Vesnina	3	3
(Czech Republic) K Zakopalová	5	6	6
(Czech Republic) L Šafářová	7	3	1

Second round
3	(Poland) A Radwańska	6	6
(Belgium) Y Wickmayer	2	3
(Germany) M Barthel	3	6	3
14	(United States) S Stephens	6	4	6
11	(Russia) M Kirilenko	5	5
(France) A Cornet	7	7
(Czech Republic) K Zakopalová	2	6^{2}
5	(Italy) S Errani	6	7^{7}

Third round
3	(Poland) A Radwańska	6	7^{7}
14	(United States) S Stephens	1	6^{2}
(France) A Cornet	5	6^{3}
5	(Italy) S Errani	7	7^{7}

Quarterfinals
3	(Poland) A Radwańska	7^{7}	7
5	(Italy) S Errani	6^{1}	5

=== Bottom half ===
==== Section 3 ====
First round
Q	(Slovakia) J Čepelová	5	4
(Slovakia) D Cibulková	7	6
Q	(Australia) A Rodionova	1	5
(Russia) E Makarova	6	7
(Germany) J Görges	6	4	3
10	(Italy) R Vinci	2	6	6
16	(Serbia) A Ivanovic	6	6
(Chinese Taipei) S-w Hsieh	1	2
PR	(Italy) F Pennetta	6	3	6
(Poland) U Radwańska	3	6	2
Q	(Canada) C Zhao	1	3
(Russia) A Pavlyuchenkova	6	6

Second round
8	(Germany) A Kerber	7^{7}	2	5
(Slovakia) D Cibulková	6^{0}	6	7
(Russia) E Makarova	0	4
10	(Italy) R Vinci	6	6
16	(Serbia) A Ivanovic	6	6
PR	(Italy) F Pennetta	4	4
(Russia) A Pavlyuchenkova	1	4
4	(China) N Li	6	6

Third round
(Slovakia) D Cibulková	6	7^{7}
10	(Italy) R Vinci	3	6^{4}
16	(Serbia) A Ivanovic	6	1	6^{5}
4	(China) N Li	3	6	7^{7}

Quarterfinals
(Slovakia) D Cibulková	6^{1}	2
4	(China) N Li	7^{7}	6

==== Section 4 ====
First round
WC	(Canada) E Bouchard	6	6
PR	(Russia) A Kleybanova	3	1
(Spain) C Suárez Navarro	6	6
(United States) J Hampton	4	4
Q	(Israel) J Glushko	7	2	3
12	(Australia) S Stosur	5	6	6
15	(Serbia) J Janković	7^{8}	4	6
Q	(Georgia (country)) A Tatishvili	6^{6}	6	3
WC	(Canada) S Fichman	5	6	6
WC	(Canada) S Dubois	7	2	2
(Romania) S Cîrstea	6	6
Q	(Ukraine) O Savchuk	2	3

Second round
6	(Czech Republic) P Kvitová	6	6
WC	(Canada) E Bouchard	3	2
(Spain) C Suárez Navarro	6	2	3
12	(Australia) S Stosur	1	6	6
15	(Serbia) J Janković	6	7^{8}
WC	(Canada) S Fichman	4	6^{6}
(Romania) S Cîrstea	5	7^{7}	6
9	(Denmark) C Wozniacki	7	6^{0}	4

Third round
6	(Czech Republic) P Kvitová	6	6
12	(Australia) S Stosur	3	3
15	(Serbia) J Janković	3	4
(Romania) S Cîrstea	6	6

Quarterfinals
6	(Czech Republic) P Kvitová	6	5	2
(Romania) S Cîrstea	4	7	6

== Qualifying ==
=== Seeds ===
1. (Russia) Svetlana Kuznetsova (qualifying competition, lucky loser)
2. (United States) Madison Keys (qualifying competition, withdrew)
3. (Japan) Ayumi Morita (qualifying competition, lucky loser)
4. (United States) Bethanie Mattek-Sands (qualifying competition, lucky loser)
5. (Netherlands) Kiki Bertens (qualified)
6. (Sweden) Johanna Larsson (qualifying competition)
7. (South Africa) Chanelle Scheepers (qualified)
8. (Spain) Sílvia Soler Espinosa (first round)
9. (Belarus) Olga Govortsova (first round)
10. (Czech Republic) Karolína Plíšková (first round)
11. (Romania) Irina-Camelia Begu (qualifying competition)
12. (United Kingdom) Heather Watson (first round)
13. (Slovakia) Jana Čepelová (qualified)
14. (New Zealand) Marina Erakovic (withdrew)
15. (Argentina) Paula Ormaechea (qualifying competition)
16. (Kazakhstan) Galina Voskoboeva (qualifying competition)
17. (France) Caroline Garcia (qualifying competition)
18. (United States) Lauren Davis (qualified)
19. (Spain) Lara Arruabarrena (qualifying competition)
20. (United States) Christina McHale (first round)
21. (Georgia (country)) Anna Tatishvili (qualified)
22. (Croatia) Petra Martić (qualified)
23. (United States) Alison Riske (qualified)
24. (Austria) Tamira Paszek (first round)

=== Qualifiers ===
1. (United States) Lauren Davis
2. (Australia) Anastasia Rodionova
3. (Croatia) Petra Martić
4. (United States) Alison Riske
5. (Netherlands) Kiki Bertens
6. (Georgia (country)) Anna Tatishvili
7. (South Africa) Chanelle Scheepers
8. (Slovakia) Jana Čepelová
9. (Romania) Alexandra Dulgheru
10. (Israel) Julia Glushko
11. (Canada) Carol Zhao
12. (Ukraine) Olga Savchuk

=== Lucky losers ===
1. (Russia) Svetlana Kuznetsova
2. (Japan) Ayumi Morita
3. (United States) Bethanie Mattek-Sands

=== Qualifying draw ===
==== First qualifier ====
First round
1	(Russia) Svetlana Kuznetsova	7	7^{7}
(United States) Vania King	5	6^{4}
WC	(Canada) Jillian O'Neill	4	3
18	(United States) Lauren Davis	6	6

Qualifying competition
1	(Russia) Svetlana Kuznetsova	7	4	4
18	(United States) Lauren Davis	5	6	6

==== Second qualifier ====
First round
2	(United States) Madison Keys	6	6
WC	(Canada) Sonja Molnar	2	2
(Australia) Anastasia Rodionova	7^{7}	5	7^{7}
24	(Austria) Tamira Paszek	6^{5}	7	6^{2}

Qualifying competition
2	(United States) Madison Keys
(Australia) Anastasia Rodionova	w/o

==== Third qualifier ====
First round
3	(Japan) Ayumi Morita	6	4	6
(United States) Maria Sanchez	4	6	3
(Kazakhstan) Sesil Karatantcheva	1	3
22	(Croatia) Petra Martić	6	6

Qualifying competition
3	(Japan) Ayumi Morita	6	4	0
22	(Croatia) Petra Martić	1	6	6

==== Fourth qualifier ====
First round
4	(United States) Bethanie Mattek-Sands	6	6
(Poland) Alicja Rosolska	1	2
WC	(Canada) Elisabeth Fournier	0	0
23	(United States) Alison Riske	6	6

Qualifying competition
4	(United States) Bethanie Mattek-Sands	6^{2}	7^{7}	0
23	(United States) Alison Riske	7^{7}	6^{4}	6

==== Fifth qualifier ====
First round
5	(Netherlands) Kiki Bertens	6	6
(South Africa) Natalie Grandin	3	3
(Portugal) Michelle Larcher de Brito	3	3
15	(Argentina) Paula Ormaechea	6	6

Qualifying competition
5	(Netherlands) Kiki Bertens	3	6	6
15	(Argentina) Paula Ormaechea	6	1	2

==== Sixth qualifier ====
First round
6	(Sweden) Johanna Larsson	6	6
(Colombia) Catalina Castaño	3	4
WC	(Canada) Gloria Liang	1	2
21	(Georgia (country)) Anna Tatishvili	6	6

Qualifying competition
6	(Sweden) Johanna Larsson	0	2
21	(Georgia (country)) Anna Tatishvili	6	6

==== Seventh qualifier ====
First round
7	(South Africa) Chanelle Scheepers	6	6
(United States) Jessica Pegula	1	1
(United States) Chieh-yu Hsu	0	2
17	(France) Caroline Garcia	6	6

Qualifying competition
7	(South Africa) Chanelle Scheepers	6	6
17	(France) Caroline Garcia	1	3

==== Eighth qualifier ====
First round
8	(Spain) Sílvia Soler Espinosa	6	4	5
(Georgia (country)) Oksana Kalashnikova	1	6	7
(Canada) Heidi El Tabakh	2	6	2
13	(Slovakia) Jana Čepelová	6	2	6

Qualifying competition
(Georgia (country)) Oksana Kalashnikova	6	0	6^{4}
13	(Slovakia) Jana Čepelová	3	6	7^{7}

==== Ninth qualifier ====
First round
9	(Belarus) Olga Govortsova	1	6	2
(Romania) Alexandra Dulgheru	6	3	6
(Japan) Sachie Ishizu	2	4
16	(Kazakhstan) Galina Voskoboeva	6	6

Qualifying competition
(Romania) Alexandra Dulgheru	7^{7}	6
16	(Kazakhstan) Galina Voskoboeva	6^{5}	2

==== Tenth qualifier ====
First round
10	(Czech Republic) Karolína Plíšková	4	2
(Canada) Gabriela Dabrowski	6	6
(Israel) Julia Glushko	6	5	7
20	(United States) Christina McHale	3	7	5

Qualifying competition
(Canada) Gabriela Dabrowski	3	4
(Israel) Julia Glushko	6	6

==== Eleventh qualifier ====
First round
11	(Romania) Irina-Camelia Begu	6	6
(Hungary) Katalin Marosi	2	3
WC	(Canada) Carol Zhao	6	6
Alt	(Croatia) Darija Jurak	4	4

Qualifying competition
11	(Romania) Irina-Camelia Begu	4	4
WC	(Canada) Carol Zhao	6	6

==== Twelfth qualifier ====
First round
12	(United Kingdom) Heather Watson	3	3
(Ukraine) Olga Savchuk	6	6
WC	(Canada) Petra Januskova	3	1
19	(Spain) Lara Arruabarrena	6	6

Qualifying competition
(Ukraine) Olga Savchuk	6	6
19	(Spain) Lara Arruabarrena	4	1
