= 2013 Western & Southern Open =

- Date: August 12–18
- Edition: 112th (men) / 85th (women)
- Category: ATP World Tour Masters 1000 (men); WTA Premier 5 (women)
- Surface: Hard
- Location: Mason, Ohio, United States
- Venue: Lindner Family Tennis Center

Champions

Men's singles
- (Spain) Rafael Nadal

Women's singles
- (Belarus) Victoria Azarenka

Men's doubles
- (United States) Bob Bryan / (United States) Mike Bryan

Women's doubles
- (Chinese Taipei) Hsieh Su-wei / (China) Peng Shuai
- Cincinnati Masters

The 2013 Western and Southern Open was a men's and women's tennis tournament played on outdoor hard courts August 12–18, 2013. It was part of the ATP World Tour Masters 1000 of the 2013 ATP World Tour, and of the WTA Premier 5 tournaments of the 2013 WTA Tour. The 2013 tournament was the 112th edition (for the men) and the 85th (for the women) of the Cincinnati Masters. The tournament is held annually at the Lindner Family Tennis Center in Mason (a suburb of Cincinnati), Ohio, United States.

The tournament singles champions were: men's, Rafael Nadal; women's, Victoria Azarenka. This was also the last tournament for reigning Wimbledon champion Marion Bartoli.

== Points and prize money ==
=== Point distribution ===
Event	W	F	SF	QF	Round of 16	Round of 32	Round of 64	Q	Q2	Q1
Men's singles	1000	600	360	180	90	45	10	25	16	0
Men's doubles	1000	600	360	180	90	0	—N/a	—N/a	—N/a	—N/a
Women's singles	900	620	395	225	125	70	1	30	20	1
Women's doubles	900	620	395	225	125	5	—N/a	—N/a	—N/a	—N/a

=== Prize money ===
Event	W	F	SF	QF	Round of 16	Round of 32	Round of 64	Q2	Q1
Men's singles	$583,800	$286,240	$144,060	$73,255	$38,040	$20,055	$10,830	$2,500	$1,270
Women's singles	$426,000	$213,000	$104,700	$49,040	$23,730	$12,200	$6,400	$2,670	$1,620
Men's doubles	$180,800	$88,500	$44,400	$22,780	$11,780	$6,210	—N/a	—N/a	—N/a
Women's doubles	$122,000	$61,600	$30,425	$15,340	$7,780	$3,840	—N/a	—N/a	—N/a

== ATP singles main-draw entrants ==
=== Seeds ===
Country	Player	Ranking	Seeds
SRB	Novak Djokovic	1	1
GBR	Andy Murray	2	2
ESP	David Ferrer	3	3
ESP	Rafael Nadal	4	4
SUI	Roger Federer	5	5
CZE	Tomáš Berdych	6	6
ARG	Juan Martín del Potro	7	7
FRA	Richard Gasquet	9	8
SUI	Stanislas Wawrinka	10	9
JPN	Kei Nishikori	11	10
GER	Tommy Haas	12	11
CAN	Milos Raonic	13	12
ESP	Nicolás Almagro	14	13
ITA	Fabio Fognini	16	14
FRA	Gilles Simon	17	15
POL	Jerzy Janowicz	18	16

- Rankings and seedings are as of August 5, 2013, before the draw is made

=== Other entrants ===
The following players received wild cards into the main singles draw:

- (United States) Brian Baker
- (United States) James Blake
- (United States) Ryan Harrison
- (United States) Jack Sock

The following players received entry from the singles qualifying draw:

- (Spain) Pablo Andújar
- (Germany) Benjamin Becker
- (Belgium) David Goffin
- (United States) Mackenzie McDonald
- (France) Adrian Mannarino
- (France) Édouard Roger-Vasselin
- (Russia) Dmitry Tursunov

=== Withdrawals ===
Before the tournament

- (Croatia) Marin Čilić (suspension)
- (Serbia) Viktor Troicki (suspension)
- (France) Jo-Wilfried Tsonga (left knee injury)

=== Retirements ===
- (France) Gilles Simon (hip injury)
- (France) Jérémy Chardy (left knee injury)

== ATP doubles main-draw entrants ==
=== Seeds ===
Country	Player	Country	Player	Rank^{1}	Seed
USA	Bob Bryan	USA	Mike Bryan	2	1
ESP	Marcel Granollers	ESP	Marc López	9	2
AUT	Alexander Peya	BRA	Bruno Soares	14	3
IND	Leander Paes	CZE	Radek Štěpánek	19	4
PAK	Aisam-ul-Haq Qureshi	NED	Jean-Julien Rojer	27	5
SWE	Robert Lindstedt	CAN	Daniel Nestor	29	6
FRA	Julien Benneteau	SRB	Nenad Zimonjić	31	7
IND	Rohan Bopanna	FRA	Édouard Roger-Vasselin	33	8

- Rankings are as of August 5, 2013

=== Other entrants ===
The following pairs received wildcards into the doubles main draw:

- (United States) Brian Baker / (United States) Rajeev Ram
- (United States) James Blake / (United States) Steve Johnson

=== Withdrawals ===
During the tournament

- (France) Jérémy Chardy (left knee injury)

== WTA singles main-draw entrants ==
=== Seeds ===
Country	Player	Ranking	Seeds
USA	Serena Williams	1	1
BLR	Victoria Azarenka	2	2
RUS	Maria Sharapova	3	3
POL	Agnieszka Radwańska	4	4
CHN	Li Na	5	5
ITA	Sara Errani	6	6
CZE	Petra Kvitová	7	7
FRA	Marion Bartoli	8	8
GER	Angelique Kerber	9	9
DEN	Caroline Wozniacki	10	10
AUS	Samantha Stosur	11	11
ITA	Roberta Vinci	12	12
BEL	Kirsten Flipkens	13	13
SRB	Jelena Janković	14	14
SRB	Ana Ivanovic	15	15
RUS	Maria Kirilenko	16	16

- Rankings are as of August 5, 2013

=== Other entrants ===
The following players received wild cards into the main singles draw:

- (United States) Lauren Davis
- (Slovakia) Daniela Hantuchová
- (United States) Bethanie Mattek-Sands

The following players received entry from the singles qualifying draw:

- (Croatia) Petra Martić
- (Canada) Eugenie Bouchard
- (United States) Vania King
- (Germany) Annika Beck
- (Sweden) Sofia Arvidsson
- (Germany) Andrea Petkovic
- (Puerto Rico) Monica Puig
- (Slovakia) Jana Čepelová
- (Slovenia) Polona Hercog
- (Georgia (country)) Anna Tatishvili
- (New Zealand) Marina Erakovic
- (Italy) Karin Knapp

The following player received entry as lucky loser:

- (Romania) Monica Niculescu

=== Withdrawals ===
Before the tournament

- (Romania) Sorana Cîrstea (abdominal injury)
- (Estonia) Kaia Kanepi
- (Switzerland) Romina Oprandi
- (Russia) Nadia Petrova
- (United Kingdom) Laura Robson (right wrist injury)

During the tournament

- (Poland) Agnieszka Radwańska (personal reasons)

== WTA doubles main-draw entrants ==
=== Seeds ===
Country	Player	Country	Player	Rank^{1}	Seed
ITA	Sara Errani	ITA	Roberta Vinci	1	1
RUS	Ekaterina Makarova	RUS	Elena Vesnina	10	2
CHN	Peng Shuai	TPE	Hsieh Su-wei	19	3
CZE	Andrea Hlaváčková	USA	Lisa Raymond	24	4
USA	Raquel Kops-Jones	USA	Abigail Spears	24	5
GER	Anna-Lena Grönefeld	CZE	Květa Peschke	27	6
TPE	Chan Hao-ching	SLO	Katarina Srebotnik	42	7
IND	Sania Mirza	CHN	Zheng Jie	42	8

- Rankings are as of August 5, 2013

=== Other entrants ===
The following pairs received wildcards into the doubles main draw:

- (Belgium) Kirsten Flipkens / (Czech Republic) Petra Kvitová
- (Slovakia) Daniela Hantuchová / (Switzerland) Martina Hingis
- (Germany) Angelique Kerber / (Germany) Andrea Petkovic
- (United States) Vania King / (Russia) Alisa Kleybanova

== Finals ==
=== Men's singles ===
(Spain) Rafael Nadal defeated (United States) John Isner 7–6^{(10–8)}, 7–6^{(7–3)}

=== Women's singles ===
(Belarus) Victoria Azarenka defeated (United States) Serena Williams, 2–6, 6–2, 7–6^{(8–6)}

=== Men's doubles ===
(United States) Bob Bryan / (United States) Mike Bryan defeated (Spain) Marcel Granollers / (Spain) Marc López, 6–4, 4–6, [10–4]

=== Women's doubles ===
(Chinese Taipei) Hsieh Su-wei / (China) Peng Shuai defeated (Germany) Anna-Lena Grönefeld / (Czech Republic) Květa Peschke, 2–6, 6–3, [12–10]
