= 2013 Rogers Cup =

- Date: August 3–11
- Edition: 124th (men) / 112th (women)
- Category: ATP World Tour Masters 1000 (men); WTA Premier 5 (women)
- Surface: Hard / outdoor
- Location: Montreal, Canada (men); Toronto, Canada (women)

Champions

Men's singles
- (Spain) Rafael Nadal

Women's singles
- (United States) Serena Williams

Men's doubles
- (Austria) Alexander Peya / (Brazil) Bruno Soares

Women's doubles
- (Serbia) Jelena Janković / (Slovenia) Katarina Srebotnik
- Canadian Open

The 2013 Rogers Cup presented by National Bank was a tennis tournament played on outdoor hard courts. It was the 124th edition (for the men) and the 112th (for the women) of the Canadian Open, and was part of the ATP World Tour Masters 1000 of the 2013 ATP World Tour, and of the WTA Premier 5 tournaments of the 2013 WTA Tour. The men's event was held at the Uniprix Stadium in Montreal, from August 3 to August 11 and the women's and legends events at the Rexall Centre in Toronto, from August 3 to August 11.

== Points and prize money ==
=== Point distribution ===
Event	W	F	SF	QF	Round of 16	Round of 32	Round of 64	Q	Q2	Q1
Men's singles	1000	600	360	180	90	45	10	25	16	0
Men's doubles	1000	600	360	180	90	0	—N/a	—N/a	—N/a	—N/a
Women's singles	900	620	395	225	125	70	1	30	20	1
Women's doubles	900	620	395	225	125	5	—N/a	—N/a	—N/a	—N/a

=== Prize money ===
The total prize money pot for 2013 was $3,496,085, an increase of around $800,000 from the previous year.

Event	W	F	SF	QF	Round of 16	Round of 32	Round of 64	Q2	Q1
Men's singles	$522,550	$256,220	$128,960	$65,575	$34,050	$17,950	$9,695	$2,145	$1,095
Women's singles	$426,000	$213,000	$104,700	$49,040	$23,730	$12,200	$6,400	$2,670	$1,620
Men's doubles	$155,490	$76,120	$38,180	$19,600	$10,130	$5,350	—N/a	—N/a	—N/a
Women's doubles	$122,000	$61,600	$30,425	$15,340	$7,780	$3,840	—N/a	—N/a	—N/a

== ATP singles main-draw entrants ==
=== Seeds ===
Country	Player	Rank^{1}	Seed
SRB	Novak Djokovic	1	1
GBR	Andy Murray	2	2
ESP	David Ferrer	3	3
ESP	Rafael Nadal	4	4
CZE	Tomáš Berdych	6	5
ARG	Juan Martín del Potro	7	6
FRA	Richard Gasquet	9	7
SUI	Stanislas Wawrinka	10	8
JPN	Kei Nishikori	11	9
GER	Tommy Haas	12	10
CAN	Milos Raonic	13	11
ESP	Nicolás Almagro	14	12
ITA	Fabio Fognini	16	13
FRA	Gilles Simon	17	14
POL	Jerzy Janowicz	18	15
SRB	Janko Tipsarević	19	16

- ^{1}Rankings are as of July 29, 2013

=== Other entrants ===
The following players received wild cards into the main singles draw:

- (Canada) Frank Dancevic
- (Canada) Jesse Levine
- (Canada) Filip Peliwo
- (Canada) Vasek Pospisil

The following players received entry from the singles qualifying draw:

- (Germany) Benjamin Becker
- (Russia) Alex Bogomolov Jr.
- (Belgium) David Goffin
- (Chinese Taipei) Lu Yen-hsun
- (Australia) Marinko Matosevic
- (Canada) Peter Polansky
- (Israel) Amir Weintraub

=== Withdrawals ===
Before the tournament

- (Croatia) Marin Čilić (drug suspension)
- (Switzerland) Roger Federer (back injury)
- (United States) Mardy Fish (personal reasons)
- (Argentina) Juan Mónaco
- (France) Gaël Monfils (ankle injury)
- (United States) Sam Querrey
- (Spain) Tommy Robredo
- (Serbia) Viktor Troicki (drug suspension)
- (France) Jo-Wilfried Tsonga (left knee injury)

=== Retirements ===
- (Russia) Nikolay Davydenko (bronchitis)
- (Germany) Tommy Haas (shoulder injury)
- (Finland) Jarkko Nieminen (hamstring injury)

== ATP doubles main-draw entrants ==
=== Seeds ===
Country	Player	Country	Player	Rank^{1}	Seed
USA	Bob Bryan	USA	Mike Bryan	2	1
ESP	Marcel Granollers	ESP	Marc López	9	2
AUT	Alexander Peya	BRA	Bruno Soares	14	3
IND	Leander Paes	CZE	Radek Štěpánek	19	4
PAK	Aisam-ul-Haq Qureshi	NED	Jean-Julien Rojer	25	5
SWE	Robert Lindstedt	CAN	Daniel Nestor	29	6
CRO	Ivan Dodig	BRA	Marcelo Melo	35	7
BLR	Max Mirnyi	ROU	Horia Tecău	38	8

- Rankings are as of July 29, 2013

=== Other entrants ===
The following pairs received wildcards into the doubles main draw:

- (Canada) Frank Dancevic / (Canada) Adil Shamasdin
- (Canada) Jesse Levine / (Canada) Vasek Pospisil

The following pair received entry as alternates:

- (France) Jérémy Chardy / (Poland) Łukasz Kubot

=== Withdrawals ===
Before the tournament

- (Canada) Vasek Pospisil (shoulder injury)

During the tournament

- (Spain) Pablo Andújar (hip injury)
- (Germany) Tommy Haas (shoulder injury)

== WTA singles main-draw entrants ==
=== Seeds ===
Country	Player	Rank^{1}	Seed
USA	Serena Williams	1	1
~~BLR~~	~~Victoria Azarenka~~	~~3~~	~~2~~
POL	Agnieszka Radwańska	4	3
CHN	Li Na	5	4
ITA	Sara Errani	6	5
CZE	Petra Kvitová	7	6
FRA	Marion Bartoli	8	7
GER	Angelique Kerber	9	8
DEN	Caroline Wozniacki	10	9
ITA	Roberta Vinci	11	10
RUS	Maria Kirilenko	13	11
AUS	Samantha Stosur	14	12
BEL	Kirsten Flipkens	15	13
USA	Sloane Stephens	16	14
SRB	Jelena Janković	17	15
SRB	Ana Ivanovic	16	16

- Rankings are as of July 29, 2013

=== Other entrants ===
The following players received wild cards into the main singles draw:

- (Belarus) Victoria Azarenka
- (France) Marion Bartoli
- (Canada) Eugenie Bouchard
- (Canada) Stéphanie Dubois
- (Canada) Sharon Fichman

The following players received entry from the singles qualifying draw:

- (Netherlands) Kiki Bertens
- (Slovakia) Jana Čepelová
- (United States) Lauren Davis
- (Romania) Alexandra Dulgheru
- (Israel) Julia Glushko
- (Croatia) Petra Martić
- (United States) Alison Riske
- (Australia) Anastasia Rodionova
- (Ukraine) Olga Savchuk
- (South Africa) Chanelle Scheepers
- (Georgia (country)) Anna Tatishvili
- (Canada) Carol Zhao

The following players received entry as lucky losers:

- (Russia) Svetlana Kuznetsova
- (United States) Bethanie Mattek-Sands
- (Japan) Ayumi Morita

=== Withdrawals ===
Before the tournament

- (Belarus) Victoria Azarenka (low back injury)
- (Romania) Simona Halep
- (Serbia) Bojana Jovanovski
- (Estonia) Kaia Kanepi (change of scheduling)
- (Germany) Sabine Lisicki
- (Switzerland) Romina Oprandi
- (United Kingdom) Laura Robson (right wrist injury)
- (China) Peng Shuai (visa)
- (Russia) Nadia Petrova (left leg injury)
- (Russia) Maria Sharapova (hip injury)

=== Retirements ===
- (France) Marion Bartoli

== WTA doubles main-draw entrants ==
=== Seeds ===
Country	Player	Country	Player	Rank^{1}	Seed
ITA	Sara Errani	ITA	Roberta Vinci	2	1
RUS	Ekaterina Makarova	RUS	Elena Vesnina	10	2
GER	Anna-Lena Grönefeld	CZE	Květa Peschke	25	3
USA	Raquel Kops-Jones	USA	Abigail Spears	34	4
IND	Sania Mirza	CHN	Zheng Jie	41	5
USA	Liezel Huber	ESP	Nuria Llagostera Vives	44	6
FRA	Kristina Mladenovic	KAZ	Galina Voskoboeva	44	7
RUS	Anastasia Pavlyuchenkova	CZE	Lucie Šafářová	47	8

- Rankings are as of July 29, 2013

=== Other entrants ===
The following pairs received wildcards into the doubles main draw:

- (Canada) Eugenie Bouchard / (Belgium) Kirsten Flipkens
- (Canada) Gabriela Dabrowski / (Canada) Sharon Fichman
- (Slovakia) Daniela Hantuchová / (Switzerland) Martina Hingis
- (Germany) Angelique Kerber / (Czech Republic) Petra Kvitová

The following pair received entry as alternates:

- (Austria) Sandra Klemenschits / (Ukraine) Olga Savchuk

=== Withdrawals ===
Before the tournament

- (United Kingdom) Laura Robson (right wrist injury)

== Finals ==
=== Men's singles ===
(Spain) Rafael Nadal defeated (Canada) Milos Raonic, 6–2, 6–2

=== Women's singles ===
(United States) Serena Williams defeated (Romania) Sorana Cîrstea 6–2, 6–0

=== Men's doubles ===
(Austria) Alexander Peya / (Brazil) Bruno Soares defeated (United Kingdom) Colin Fleming / (United Kingdom) Andy Murray, 6–4, 7–6^{(7–4)}

=== Women's doubles ===
(Serbia) Jelena Janković / (Slovenia) Katarina Srebotnik defeated (Germany) Anna-Lena Grönefeld / (Czech Republic) Květa Peschke, 5–7, 6–1, [10–6]
