= 2013 Victoria Azarenka tennis season =

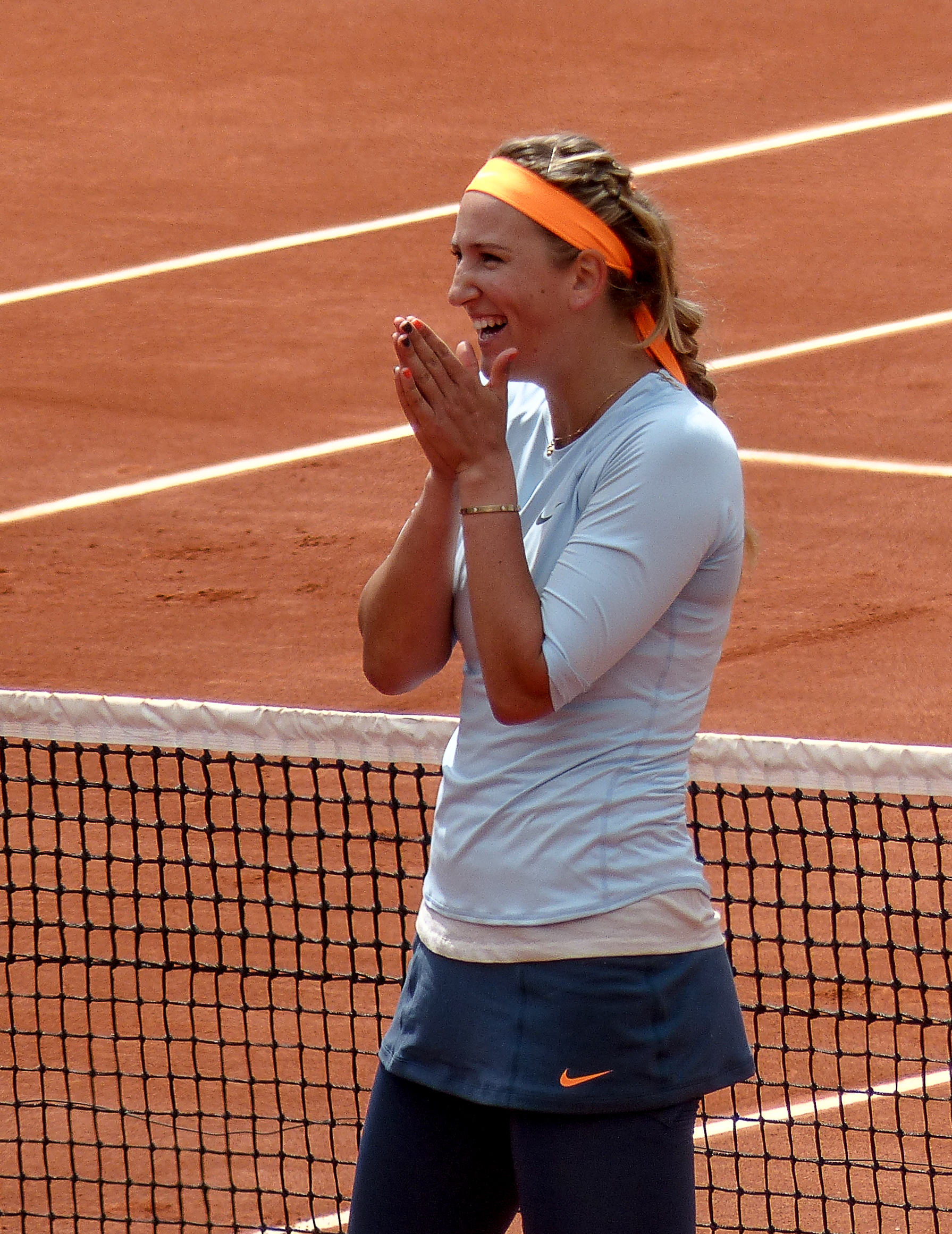
- Victoria Azarenka at the 2013 French Open.
- Full name: Victoria Azarenka
- Country: Belarus

Singles
- Season record: 44–8 (84.61%)
- Calendar titles: 3
- Current ranking: No. 2
- Year-end ranking: No. 2
- Ranking change from previous year: ▼1

Grand Slam & significant results
- Australian Open: W
- French Open: SF
- Wimbledon: 2R
- US Open: F

Grand Slam mixed doubles results
- Injuries: Ankle (March–April); Knee (June)

The 2013 Victoria Azarenka tennis season officially began at the 2013 Brisbane International, the first of two simultaneous events which opened the official 2013 season, and concluded with her fifth consecutive qualification for the 2013 WTA Tour Championships.

== Yearly summary ==
=== Australian Open series ===
Azarenka began her 2013 season as the top seed at the 2013 Brisbane International, her first participation at the event since winning in 2009. She defeated German Sabine Lisicki in the second round after receiving a bye in the first round. This was followed up with a crushing two set victory over Ksenia Pervak in the quarter-finals, to maintain her record of not dropping a set in the tournament thus far. Azarenka was later forced to withdraw from her scheduled semi-final against Serena Williams due to a toe injury.

Her next tournament was the defence of her Australian Open title. Azarenka won her first six matches dropping only one set en route (against Jamie Hampton in the third round), to reach the final for the second consecutive year, where she faced Li Na of China. Azarenka was able to successfully defend her title with a three set victory in the final; thus, she became the first woman since Serena Williams in 2009–10 to successfully defend her Australian Open title. With the victory, she also became only the fifth active player (after Serena and Venus Williams, Maria Sharapova and Svetlana Kuznetsova) to hold two or more Grand Slam singles titles.

=== Middle East series ===
As the defending champion in Qatar, Azarenka once again reached the championship match, where she met Serena Williams, who replaced her as World No. 1 upon reaching the semi-finals (Williams did not play in Doha last year). After receiving a bye in the first round, she defeated Romina Oprandi, Christina McHale (without losing a game), Sara Errani and Agnieszka Radwańska to set up the final meeting against Williams. Azarenka scored just her second career victory over Williams, winning in the championship match in three sets and successfully defending her title.

Azarenka missed the Dubai Tennis Championships for the second year in a row, withdrawing from the tournament due to a foot injury she sustained in Doha.

=== American hard court season ===
Azarenka's first tournament of the American hard court season was the defense of her Indian Wells title. As the top seed in the absence of Serena Williams, Azarenka got a first round bye, following which she defeated Daniela Hantuchová, Kirsten Flipkens (in three sets) and Urszula Radwańska, before withdrawing from the tournament prior to her quarter-final match against eventual runner-up Caroline Wozniacki due to an ankle injury. Her failure to defend her points saw her world ranking drop to No. 3 at the end of this tournament.

The ankle injury she suffered at Indian Wells forced her out of the Miami tournament the following week.

=== Clay court season ===
Azarenka decided to skip the Stuttgart event, to allow for recovery from her ankle injury. Her next tournament was the Mutua Madrid Open, where she was a finalist last year. She defeated recent Portugal Open champion Anastasia Pavlyuchenkova in two tiebreak sets, in her first match since Indian Wells, before being upset in the second round by World No. 24 Ekaterina Makarova in three sets; thus losing her first match this season after eighteen matches undefeated.

Her next tournament was Rome. After receiving a first round bye, she defeated Julia Görges, Ayumi Morita (who retired in the second set), Samantha Stosur and Sara Errani to reach the final, where she was defeated by Serena Williams in straight sets.

Azarenka's next tournament was the French Open. She defeated Elena Vesnina, Annika Beck, Alizé Cornet, 2010 champion Francesca Schiavone and former doubles partner Maria Kirilenko to reach her first French Open semi-final, however, she was defeated there by 2012 champion Maria Sharapova in three sets.

=== Grass court season ===
In the first round of the 2013 Wimbledon Championships she defeated Maria João Koehler in straight sets, but suffered a knee injury early in the second set. This injury ultimately forced her to withdraw from the Championships before her second round match against Flavia Pennetta. Her withdrawal was among seven big-name casualties on the tournament's third day, which has also led to questions being raised about the surface of the grass. Her withdrawal also ended a streak of four consecutive Grand Slam semi-finals.

=== US Open series ===
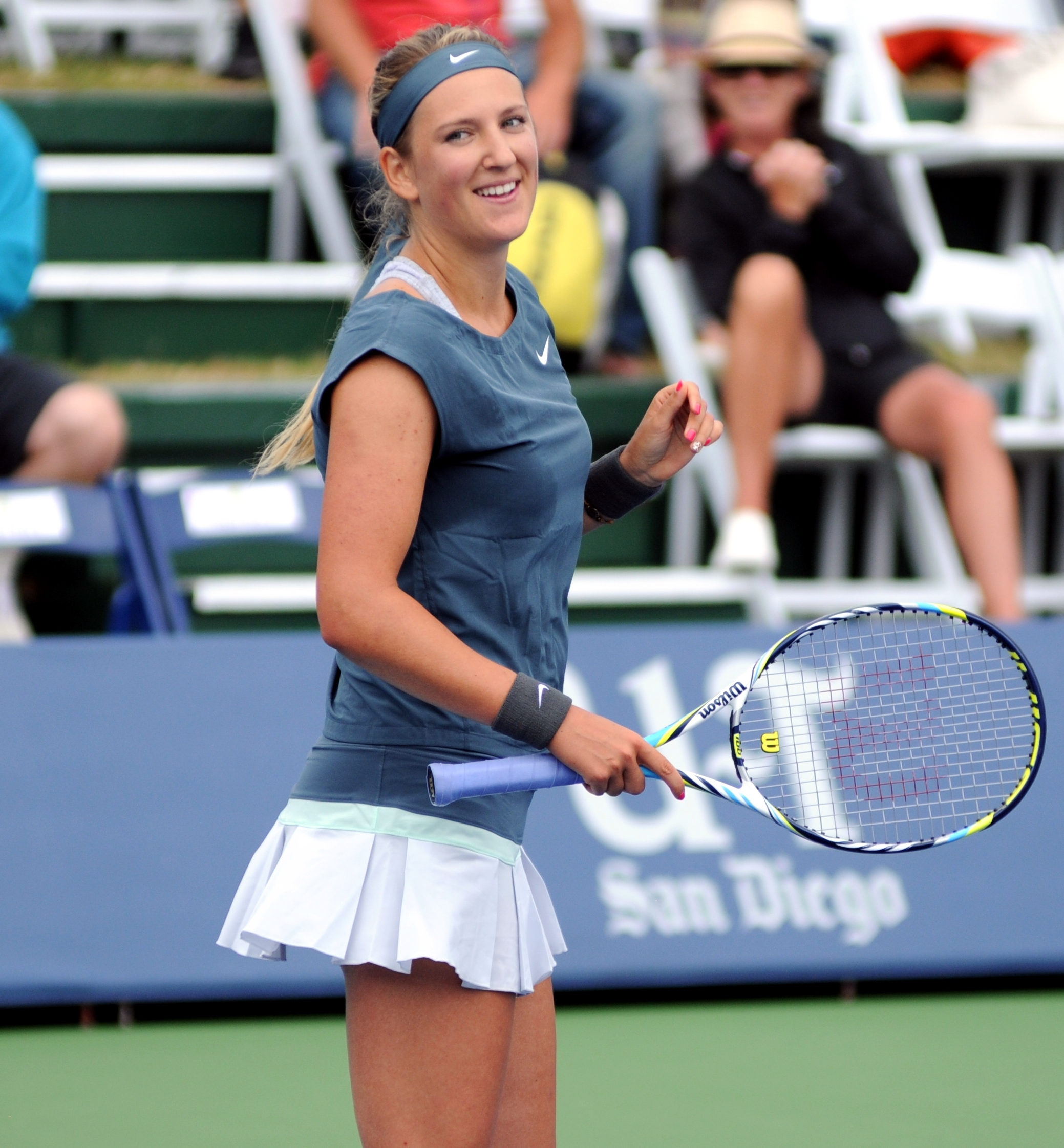
Victoria Azarenka at the 2013 Southern California Open, where she reached the final.

Following her injury-enforced early exit from Wimbledon, Azarenka returned to action at the 2013 Southern California Open, where she was the top seed. After receiving a first round bye, she defeated Francesca Schiavone, Urszula Radwańska and Ana Ivanovic (the latter in three sets) before losing to Samantha Stosur in straight sets in the championship match. The loss to Stosur marked her first loss against her, after previously winning their first eight encounters.

Azarenka was later forced to withdraw from the Rogers Cup due to a back injury she suffered in the championship match in Carlsbad.

Seeded second at Cincinnati, Azarenka received a first round bye, following which she won her first match at the tournament since 2009, when she defeated local hope Vania King in the second round. That was then followed by wins over Magdaléna Rybáriková, Caroline Wozniacki (her first victory against her since 2009) and Jelena Janković, en route to reaching her fifth final of the year, where she defeated Serena Williams in a thrilling championship match to pick up her third title for the year.

At the US Open, where Azarenka was seeded second, she successfully reached the final for the second consecutive year, only dropping two sets en route. However, she lost in the final to Serena Williams in three sets. She was the only player to win a set against Williams over the last two years.

=== Asian hard court season ===
Following the US Open, Azarenka began her Asian swing at the Toray Pan Pacific Open in Tokyo, where she was the top seed. However, after receiving a first round bye, she lost in the second round to former number one and seven-time Grand Slam champion Venus Williams in straight sets.

Azarenka's next tournament was the China Open, where she was the defending champion. She lost in the first round to Andrea Petkovic in three sets, delivering 15 double faults and committing 44 unforced errors in the process.

=== WTA Tour Championships ===
Following Azarenka's run to the US Open final, she qualified for the WTA Tour Championships for the fifth consecutive year. She was placed in the White Group along with Li Na, Sara Errani and Jelena Janković. She started off with a tight straight-sets victory over Errani, but then fell to Janković and Li in her remaining matches, thus failing to reach the semi-finals for the first time since 2010 and spelling an end to her season.

The defeat to Li marked Azarenka's fifth loss in her past six matches, thus making for a poor end to her 2013 season. She ended the year ranked world number two, behind Serena Williams.

== All matches ==
=== Singles matches ===
| Tournament | Match | Round | Opponent/Ranking | Result | Score |
| Brisbane International; Brisbane, Australia; WTA Premier; Hard, outdoor 31 December 2012 – 6 January 2013 | | 1R | Bye | | |
| Brisbane International; Brisbane, Australia; WTA Premier; Hard, outdoor 31 December 2012 – 6 January 2013 | 1 | 2R | (Germany) Sabine Lisicki / #37 | Win | 6–3, 6–3 |
| Brisbane International; Brisbane, Australia; WTA Premier; Hard, outdoor 31 December 2012 – 6 January 2013 | 2 | QF | (Kazakhstan) Ksenia Pervak / #103 | Win | 6–1, 6–0 |
| Brisbane International; Brisbane, Australia; WTA Premier; Hard, outdoor 31 December 2012 – 6 January 2013 | | SF | (United States) Serena Williams / #3 | Withdrew | N/A |
Australian Open; Melbourne, Australia; Grand Slam; Hard, outdoor 14–27 January 2013
| Australian Open; Melbourne, Australia; Grand Slam; Hard, outdoor 14–27 January 2013 | 3 | 1R | (Romania) Monica Niculescu / #58 | Win | 6–1, 6–4 |
| Australian Open; Melbourne, Australia; Grand Slam; Hard, outdoor 14–27 January 2013 | 4 | 2R | (Greece) Eleni Daniilidou / #94 | Win | 6–1, 6–0 |
| Australian Open; Melbourne, Australia; Grand Slam; Hard, outdoor 14–27 January 2013 | 5 | 3R | (United States) Jamie Hampton / #63 | Win | 6–4, 4–6, 6–2 |
| Australian Open; Melbourne, Australia; Grand Slam; Hard, outdoor 14–27 January 2013 | 6 | 4R | (Russia) Elena Vesnina / #47 | Win | 6–1, 6–1 |
| Australian Open; Melbourne, Australia; Grand Slam; Hard, outdoor 14–27 January 2013 | 7 | QF | (Russia) Svetlana Kuznetsova / #75 | Win | 7–5, 6–1 |
| Australian Open; Melbourne, Australia; Grand Slam; Hard, outdoor 14–27 January 2013 | 8 | SF | (United States) Sloane Stephens / #25 | Win | 6–1, 6–4 |
| Australian Open; Melbourne, Australia; Grand Slam; Hard, outdoor 14–27 January 2013 | 9 | W | (China) Li Na / #6 | Win (1) | 4–6, 6–4, 6–3 |
| Qatar Ladies Open; Doha, Qatar; WTA Premier 5 Hard, outdoor 11–17 February 2013 | | 1R | Bye | | |
| Qatar Ladies Open; Doha, Qatar; WTA Premier 5 Hard, outdoor 11–17 February 2013 | 10 | 2R | (Switzerland) Romina Oprandi / #62 | Win | 6–2, 6–3 |
| Qatar Ladies Open; Doha, Qatar; WTA Premier 5 Hard, outdoor 11–17 February 2013 | 11 | 3R | (United States) Christina McHale / #44 | Win | 6–0, 6–0 |
| Qatar Ladies Open; Doha, Qatar; WTA Premier 5 Hard, outdoor 11–17 February 2013 | 12 | QF | (Italy) Sara Errani / #7 | Win | 6–2, 6–2 |
| Qatar Ladies Open; Doha, Qatar; WTA Premier 5 Hard, outdoor 11–17 February 2013 | 13 | SF | (Poland) Agnieszka Radwańska / #4 | Win | 6–3, 6–3 |
| Qatar Ladies Open; Doha, Qatar; WTA Premier 5 Hard, outdoor 11–17 February 2013 | 14 | W | (United States) Serena Williams / #2 | Win (2) | 7–6^{(8–6)}, 2–6, 6–3 |
| Dubai Tennis Championships; Dubai, United Arab Emirates; WTA Premier; Hard, outdoor 18–24 February 2012 | Withdrew | | | | |
| Indian Wells; Indian Wells, United States of America; WTA Premier Mandatory; Hard, outdoor 4–17 March 2012 | | 1R | Bye | | |
| Indian Wells; Indian Wells, United States of America; WTA Premier Mandatory; Hard, outdoor 4–17 March 2012 | 15 | 2R | (Slovakia) Daniela Hantuchová / #73 | Win | 6–4, 6–1 |
| Indian Wells; Indian Wells, United States of America; WTA Premier Mandatory; Hard, outdoor 4–17 March 2012 | 16 | 3R | (Belgium) Kirsten Flipkens / #31 | Win | 3–6, 6–3, 6–0 |
| Indian Wells; Indian Wells, United States of America; WTA Premier Mandatory; Hard, outdoor 4–17 March 2012 | 17 | 4R | (Poland) Urszula Radwańska / #37 | Win | 6–3, 6–1 |
| Indian Wells; Indian Wells, United States of America; WTA Premier Mandatory; Hard, outdoor 4–17 March 2012 | | QF | (Denmark) Caroline Wozniacki / #10 | Withdrew | N/A |
| Sony Open; Miami, United States of America; WTA Premier Mandatory; Hard, outdoor 18–31 March 2012 | Withdrew | | | | |
| Mutua Madrid Open; Madrid, Spain; WTA Premier Mandatory; Clay, outdoor 4–12 May 2013 | 18 | 1R | (Russia) Anastasia Pavlyuchenkova / #19 | Win | 7–6^{(10–8)}, 7–6^{(7–3)} |
| Mutua Madrid Open; Madrid, Spain; WTA Premier Mandatory; Clay, outdoor 4–12 May 2013 | 19 | 2R | (Russia) Ekaterina Makarova / #24 | Loss | 6–1, 2–6, 3–6 |
| Internazionali BNL d'Italia; Rome, Italy; WTA Premier 5 Clay, outdoor 13–19 May 2013 | | 1R | Bye | | |
| Internazionali BNL d'Italia; Rome, Italy; WTA Premier 5 Clay, outdoor 13–19 May 2013 | 20 | 2R | (Germany) Julia Görges / #25 | Win | 6–2, 6–0 |
| Internazionali BNL d'Italia; Rome, Italy; WTA Premier 5 Clay, outdoor 13–19 May 2013 | 21 | 3R | (Japan) Ayumi Morita / #43 | Win | 6–1, 2–0 ret. |
| Internazionali BNL d'Italia; Rome, Italy; WTA Premier 5 Clay, outdoor 13–19 May 2013 | 22 | QF | (Australia) Samantha Stosur / #10 | Win | 6–4, 1–6, 6–4 |
| Internazionali BNL d'Italia; Rome, Italy; WTA Premier 5 Clay, outdoor 13–19 May 2013 | 23 | SF | (Italy) Sara Errani / #8 | Win | 6–0, 7–5 |
| Internazionali BNL d'Italia; Rome, Italy; WTA Premier 5 Clay, outdoor 13–19 May 2013 | 24 | F | (United States) Serena Williams / #1 | Loss (1) | 1–6, 3–6 |
| French Open; Paris, France; Grand Slam; Clay, outdoor 26–9 June 2013 | 25 | 1R | (Russia) Elena Vesnina / #36 | Win | 6–1, 6–4 |
| French Open; Paris, France; Grand Slam; Clay, outdoor 26–9 June 2013 | 26 | 2R | (Germany) Annika Beck / #62 | Win | 6–4, 6–3 |
| French Open; Paris, France; Grand Slam; Clay, outdoor 26–9 June 2013 | 27 | 3R | (France) Alizé Cornet / #27 | Win | 4–6, 6–3, 6–1 |
| French Open; Paris, France; Grand Slam; Clay, outdoor 26–9 June 2013 | 28 | 4R | (Italy) Francesca Schiavone / #50 | Win | 6–3, 6–0 |
| French Open; Paris, France; Grand Slam; Clay, outdoor 26–9 June 2013 | 29 | QF | (Russia) Maria Kirilenko / #12 | Win | 7–6^{(7–3)}, 6–2 |
| French Open; Paris, France; Grand Slam; Clay, outdoor 26–9 June 2013 | 30 | SF | (Russia) Maria Sharapova / #2 | Loss | 1–6, 6–2, 4–6 |
| The Championships, Wimbledon; London, Great Britain; Grand Slam; Grass, outdoor 24 June–7 July 2013 | 31 | 1R | (Portugal) Maria João Koehler / #107 | Win | 6–1, 6–2 |
| The Championships, Wimbledon; London, Great Britain; Grand Slam; Grass, outdoor 24 June–7 July 2013 | | 2R | (Italy) Flavia Pennetta / #158 | Withdrew | N/A |
| Southern California Open; Carlsbad, United States of America; WTA Premier; Hard, outdoor 28–3 August 2013 | | 1R | Bye | | |
| Southern California Open; Carlsbad, United States of America; WTA Premier; Hard, outdoor 28–3 August 2013 | 32 | 2R | (Italy) Francesca Schiavone / #55 | Win | 6–2, 6–3 |
| Southern California Open; Carlsbad, United States of America; WTA Premier; Hard, outdoor 28–3 August 2013 | 33 | QF | (Poland) Urszula Radwańska / #39 | Win | 6–1, 6–2 |
| Southern California Open; Carlsbad, United States of America; WTA Premier; Hard, outdoor 28–3 August 2013 | 34 | SF | (Serbia) Ana Ivanovic / #17 | Win | 6–0, 4–6, 6–3 |
| Southern California Open; Carlsbad, United States of America; WTA Premier; Hard, outdoor 28–3 August 2013 | 35 | F | (Australia) Samantha Stosur / #13 | Loss (2) | 3–6, 2–6 |
| Rogers Cup; Toronto, Canada; WTA Premier 5 Hard, outdoor 5–11 August 2013 | Withdrew | | | | |
| Western & Southern Open; Cincinnati, United States of America; WTA Premier 5 Hard, outdoor 12–18 August 2013 | | 1R | Bye | | |
| Western & Southern Open; Cincinnati, United States of America; WTA Premier 5 Hard, outdoor 12–18 August 2013 | 36 | 2R | (United States) Vania King / #117 | Win | 6–1, 7–6^{(8–6)} |
| Western & Southern Open; Cincinnati, United States of America; WTA Premier 5 Hard, outdoor 12–18 August 2013 | 37 | 3R | (Slovakia) Magdaléna Rybáriková / #33 | Win | 6–3, 6–4 |
| Western & Southern Open; Cincinnati, United States of America; WTA Premier 5 Hard, outdoor 12–18 August 2013 | 38 | QF | (Denmark) Caroline Wozniacki / #10 | Win | 6–3, 7–6^{(7–5)} |
| Western & Southern Open; Cincinnati, United States of America; WTA Premier 5 Hard, outdoor 12–18 August 2013 | 39 | SF | (Serbia) Jelena Janković / #15 | Win | 4–6, 6–2, 6–3 |
| Western & Southern Open; Cincinnati, United States of America; WTA Premier 5 Hard, outdoor 12–18 August 2013 | 40 | W | (United States) Serena Williams / #1 | Win (3) | 2–6, 6–2, 7–6^{(8–6)} |
| US Open; New York City, United States of America; Grand Slam; Grass, outdoor 26 August–9 September 2013 | 41 | 1R | (Germany) Dinah Pfizenmaier / #99 | Win | 6–0, 6–0 |
| US Open; New York City, United States of America; Grand Slam; Grass, outdoor 26 August–9 September 2013 | 42 | 2R | (Canada) Aleksandra Wozniak / #323 | Win | 6–3, 6–1 |
| US Open; New York City, United States of America; Grand Slam; Grass, outdoor 26 August–9 September 2013 | 43 | 3R | (France) Alizé Cornet / #28 | Win | 6–7^{(2–7)}, 6–3, 6–2 |
| US Open; New York City, United States of America; Grand Slam; Grass, outdoor 26 August–9 September 2013 | 44 | 4R | (Serbia) Ana Ivanovic / #15 | Win | 4–6, 6–3, 6–4 |
| US Open; New York City, United States of America; Grand Slam; Grass, outdoor 26 August–9 September 2013 | 45 | QF | (Slovakia) Daniela Hantuchová / #48 | Win | 6–2, 6–3 |
| US Open; New York City, United States of America; Grand Slam; Grass, outdoor 26 August–9 September 2013 | 46 | SF | (Italy) Flavia Pennetta / #83 | Win | 6–4, 6–2 |
| US Open; New York City, United States of America; Grand Slam; Grass, outdoor 26 August–9 September 2013 | 47 | F | (United States) Serena Williams / #1 | Loss (3) | 5–7, 7–6^{(8–6)}, 1–6 |
| Toray Pan Pacific Open; Tokyo, Japan; WTA Premier 5 Hard, outdoor 23–28 September 2013 | | 1R | Bye | | |
| Toray Pan Pacific Open; Tokyo, Japan; WTA Premier 5 Hard, outdoor 23–28 September 2013 | 48 | 2R | (United States) Venus Williams / #63 | Loss | 2–6, 4–6 |
| China Open; Beijing, China; WTA Premier Mandatory; Hard, outdoor 28 September–6 October 2013 | 49 | 1R | (Germany) Andrea Petkovic / #50 | Loss | 4–6, 6–2, 4–6 |
| WTA Tour Championships; Istanbul, Turkey; WTA Tour Championships; Hard, indoor 22–27 October 2013 | 50 | RR | (Italy) Sara Errani / #6 | Win | 7–6^{(7–4)}, 6–2 |
| WTA Tour Championships; Istanbul, Turkey; WTA Tour Championships; Hard, indoor 22–27 October 2013 | 51 | RR | (Serbia) Jelena Janković / #8 | Loss | 4–6, 3–6 |
| WTA Tour Championships; Istanbul, Turkey; WTA Tour Championships; Hard, indoor 22–27 October 2013 | 52 | RR | (China) Li Na / #5 | Loss | 2–6, 1–6 |

== Tournament schedule ==
=== Singles schedule ===
Victoria Azarenka's 2013 singles tournament schedule is as follows:

| Date | Championship | Location | Category | Surface | Prev. result | Prev. points | New points | Outcome |
|---|---|---|---|---|---|---|---|---|
| 30 December 2012– 6 January 2013 | Brisbane International | Brisbane (AUS) | WTA Premier | Hard | DNP | 0 | 200 | Withdrew before semi-final match (against Serena Williams) |
| 14 January 2013– 27 January 2013 | Australian Open | Melbourne (AUS) | Grand Slam | Hard | W | 2000 | 2000 | Won in the final against Li Na |
| 11 February 2013– 17 February 2013 | Qatar Total Open | Doha (QAT) | WTA Premier 5 | Hard | W | 900 | 900 | Won in the final against Serena Williams |
| 18 February 2013– 23 February 2013 | Dubai Tennis Championships | Dubai (UAE) | WTA Premier | Hard | DNP | 0 | 0 | Withdrew before her first match due to a foot injury |
| 4 March 2013– 17 March 2013 | Indian Wells | Indian Wells (USA) | WTA Premier Mandatory | Hard | W | 1000 | 250 | Withdrew before quarter-final match (against Caroline Wozniacki) |
| 18 March 2013– 31 March 2013 | Sony Ericsson Open | Miami (USA) | WTA Premier Mandatory | Hard | QF | 250 | 0 | Withdrew before her first match due to an ankle injury |
| 6 May 2013– 12 May 2013 | Mutua Madrid Masters | Madrid (ESP) | WTA Premier Mandatory | Clay | F | 700 | 60 | Lost in the second round against Ekaterina Makarova |
| 13 May 2013– 19 May 2013 | Internazionali BNL d'Italia | Rome (ITA) | WTA Premier 5 | Clay | 3R | 160 | 700 | Lost in the final against Serena Williams |
| 26 May 2013– 9 June 2013 | French Open | Paris (FRA) | Grand Slam | Clay | 4R | 280 | 900 | Lost in the semi-finals against Maria Sharapova |
| 23 June 2013– 7 July 2013 | Wimbledon | London (GBR) | Grand Slam | Grass | SF | 900 | 100 | Withdrew before second round match (against Flavia Pennetta) |
| 28 July 2013– 4 August 2013 | Southern California Open | Carlsbad (USA) | WTA Premier | Hard | DNP | 0 | 250 | Lost in the final against Samantha Stosur |
| 5 August 2013– 11 August 2013 | Rogers Cup | Toronto (CAN) | WTA Premier 5 | Hard | 2R | 60 | 0 | Withdrew before the tournament began due to a back injury |
| 12 August 2013– 18 August 2013 | Western and Southern Open | Cincinnati (USA) | WTA Premier 5 | Hard | DNP | 0 | 900 | Won in the final against Serena Williams |
| 26 August 2013– 9 September 2013 | US Open | New York (USA) | Grand Slam | Hard | F | 1400 | 1400 | Lost in the final against Serena Williams |
| 23 September 2013– 28 September 2013 | Toray Pan Pacific Open | Tokyo (JPN) | WTA Premier 5 | Hard | QF | 250 | 60 | Lost in the second round against Venus Williams |
| 28 September 2013– 6 October 2013 | China Open | Beijing (CHN) | WTA Premier Mandatory | Hard | W | 1000 | 5 | Lost in the first round against Andrea Petković |
| 21 October 2013– 27 October 2013 | WTA Tour Championships | Istanbul (TUR) | WTA Tour Championships | Hard (i) | SF | 530 | 400 | Eliminated in round robin stage |

== Yearly Records ==
=== Head-to-head match-ups ===
Bold indicates that the player was in the Top 10, italics denotes that the player was in the Top 20 (at the time of the match being played). This list is ordered by number of wins to number of losses in chronological order played.

- (Italy) **Sara Errani** 3–0
- (France) Alizé Cornet 2–0
- (Slovakia) Daniela Hantuchová 2–0
- (Serbia) Ana Ivanovic 2–0
- (Poland) Urszula Radwańska 2–0
- (Italy) Francesca Schiavone 2–0
- (Russia) Elena Vesnina 2–0
- (United States) **Serena Williams** 2–2
- (Serbia) **Jelena Janković** 1–1
- (China) **Li Na** 1–1
- (Germany) Annika Beck 1–0
- (Greece) Eleni Daniilidou 1–0
- (Belgium) Kirsten Flipkens 1–0
- (Germany) Julia Görges 1–0
- (United States) Jamie Hampton 1–0
- (United States) Vania King 1–0
- (Russia) Maria Kirilenko 1–0
- (Portugal) Maria João Koehler 1–0
- (Russia) Svetlana Kuznetsova 1–0
- (Germany) Sabine Lisicki 1–0
- (United States) Christina McHale 1–0
- (Japan) Ayumi Morita 1–0
- (Romania) Monica Niculescu 1–0
- (Switzerland) Romina Oprandi 1–0
- (Russia) Anastasia Pavlyuchenkova 1–0
- (Italy) Flavia Pennetta 1–0
- (Kazakhstan) Ksenia Pervak 1–0
- (Germany) Dinah Pfizenmaier 1–0
- (Poland) **Agnieszka Radwańska** 1–0
- (Slovakia) Magdaléna Rybáriková 1–0
- (United States) Sloane Stephens 1–0
- (Denmark) **Caroline Wozniacki** 1–0
- (Canada) Aleksandra Wozniak 1–0
- (Australia) **Samantha Stosur** 1–1
- (Russia) Ekaterina Makarova 0–1
- (Germany) Andrea Petkovic 0–1
- (Russia) **Maria Sharapova** 0–1
- (United States) Venus Williams 0–1

=== Singles ===
==== Singles: 6 (3–3) ====
| Category Grand Slam (1–1) WTA Tour Championships (0–0) WTA Premier Mandatory (0–0) WTA Premier 5 (2–1) WTA Premier (0–1) | Titles by surface Hard (3–2) Clay (0–1) Grass (0–0) | Titles by conditions Outdoors (3–3) Indoors (0–0) |

| Outcome | No. | Date | Championship | Surface | Opponent in the final | Score in the final |
|---|---|---|---|---|---|---|
| Winner | 1. | January 26, 2013 | Australian Open, Melbourne, Australia | Hard | (China) Li Na | 4–6, 6–4, 6–3 |
| Winner | 2. | February 17, 2013 | Qatar Ladies Open, Doha, Qatar | Hard | (United States) Serena Williams | 7–6^{(8–6)}, 2–6, 6–3 |
| Runner-up | 1. | May 19, 2013 | Internazionali BNL d'Italia, Rome, Italy | Clay | (United States) Serena Williams | 1–6, 3–6 |
| Runner-up | 2. | August 4, 2013 | Southern Californian Open, Carlsbad, USA | Hard | (Australia) Samantha Stosur | 3–6, 2–6 |
| Winner | 3. | August 18, 2013 | Western & Southern Open, Cincinnati, USA | Hard | (United States) Serena Williams | 2–6, 6–2, 7–6^{(8–6)} |
| Runner-up | 3. | September 8, 2013 | US Open, New York, USA | Hard | (United States) Serena Williams | 5–7, 7–6^{(8–6)}, 1–6 |

=== Earnings ===
| # | Event | Prize money | Year-to-date |
|---|---|---|---|
| 1 | Brisbane International | $46,487 | $46,487 |
| 2 | **Australian Open** | $2,236,936 | $2,283,423 |
| 3 | **Qatar Total Open** | $426,000 | $2,709,423 |
| 4 | Indian Wells | $104,000 | $2,813,423 |
| 5 | Mutua Madrid Open | $27,346 | $2,840,769 |
| 6 | Internazionali BNL d'Italia | $226,385 | $3,067,154 |
| 7 | French Open | $494,221 | $3,561,375 |
| 8 | Wimbledon | $59,461 | $3,620,836 |
| 9 | Southern California Open | $68,200 | $3,689,036 |
| 10 | **Western & Southern Open** | $426,000 | $4,150,036 |
| 11 | US Open | $1,550,000 | $5,700,036 |
| | | | $5,700,036 |

Figures in United States dollars (USD) unless noted.

== Exhibition matches ==
Victoria Azarenka took part in the annual BNP Paribas Showdown, where she faced Serena Williams in a rematch of their 2012 US Open final. Azarenka lost the exhibition match in straight sets. At the end of the year Azarenka scored another victory on Williams, in an exhibition in Thailand. She won in straight sets.

| Outcome | No. | Date | Tournament | Surface | Opponent | Score |
|---|---|---|---|---|---|---|
| Lost | 1. | March 4, 2013 | BNP Paribas Showdown, Manhattan, New York | Hard | (United States) Serena Williams | 4–6, 3–6 |
| Won | 2. | December 28, 2013 | Intercontinental Hotel, Hua Hin | Hard | (United States) Serena Williams | 7–5, 6–3 |

== See also ==
- 2013 Li Na tennis season
- 2013 Serena Williams tennis season
- 2013 WTA Tour
