= 2013 Li Na tennis season =

Singles
- Season record: 44–14 (75.86%)
- Calendar titles: 1
- Current ranking: No. 3
- Ranking change from previous year: ▲4

Grand Slam & significant results
- Australian Open: F
- French Open: 2R
- Wimbledon: QF
- US Open: SF
- Last updated on: 28 October 2013.

The 2013 Li Na tennis season officially began on 31 December with the start of the 2013 WTA Tour at the first edition of the 2013 Shenzhen Open.

== Yearly summary ==
=== Early hard court season and Australian Open ===
==== Shenzhen Open ====
Li Na started her season strongly by participating the inaugural Shenzhen Open in her home country. Defeating Mandy Minella, Julia Cohen, Bojana Jovanovski and country woman Peng Shuai en route, Li advanced to her first final of the year against fifth seed Klára Zakopalová. After splitting the first two sets, the deciding set was a tight affair, but Li broke her opponent's last service game to win the match. It was Li's first title of the year and seventh overall.

==== Apia International ====
Li then competed in Sydney in preparation for the Australian Open. On her road to the semifinals, Li defeated rising star Christina McHale, qualifier Ayumi Morita and another American prodigy Madison Keys, amassing a perfect 8–0 this season. In the semifinal Li faced Agnieszka Radwańska and went on to lose in straight sets. Radwańska later won the title.

==== Australian Open ====
Entering the first Grand Slam of the year, Li defeated young players Sesil Karatantcheva, Olga Govortsova, Sorana Cîrstea and Julia Görges en route to set up a quarter final match between her tour rivalry and friend Agnieszka Radwańska. Li took full advantage of her well-rounded performance, ending the Pole's Australian run in straight sets. In the semifinals, world No. 2 Maria Sharapova won only 4 games in a lopsided victory for Li. This would be Li's third Major final in her career .

Li's opponent in the final was defending champion Victoria Azarenka. The pair entered the final with 1 Major victory each. Li won the first set but fell twice in the second set. She twisted her left ankle and also hit her head on the court. Li, though injured, continued the match and was defeated by Azarenka in three sets. Li received a huge applause from the audience while giving her speech in the ceremony later that night.

Because of her left ankle injury, Li withdrew from 2013 Qatar Total Open, 2013 Dubai Tennis Championships and 2013 BNP Paribas Open. She continued her season in 2013 Sony Open Tennis in March.

==== Sony Open Tennis ====
After not participating any tour events for 2 months, Li returned to the American hard court season in Miami. As the fifth seed of the event

=== US Open Series and US Open ===
==== Rogers Cup ====
In her first match since Wimbledon, she beat Anastasia Pavlyuchenkova in two easy sets. In the third round Li faced Ana Ivanovic. The two traded sets but in the final set in went to a tiebreak, and Li earned a hard-fought victory. Li then defeated Dominika Cibulková and proceeded to the semifinal where she lost to Sorana Cîrstea in two sets.

==== Western & Southern Open ====
Li was the defending champion, and went on to make the semifinals. She lost to Serena Williams, 7–5 7–5, and double faulted to lose both sets.

=== Asian hard court season and Year-end Championships ===
==== WTA Championships ====
Li was drawn in the White group along with Victoria Azarenka, Sara Errani and Jelena Janković. She opened her campaign with a straight set win over Errani, improving to 6–0 in career head-to-head meetings against her. She was behind 3–1 in the second set before winning the next four games. She twice served for the match, wasting a match point at 5–3, and dropped serve on both occasions. Trailing 3–1 in the tiebreaker, Li won the next five points and converted her third match point when Errani dumped a forehand into the net. She emerged victorious against Janković in three topsy-turvy sets. In her final round robin match against Azarenka, she stormed out to a 4–2 lead before Azarenka suffered a lower back injury, allowing Li to win in two easy sets. She finished the match with an impressive +20 winner to error differential (28 to 8). The win meant she advanced to the semifinals for the first time with a 3–0 round robin record. She secured a career-high ranking of world No. 3 by besting Petra Kvitová in the semifinals, the highest ranking an Asian player, male or female, has ever achieved. In the final she made a strong start, blasting 10 winners en route to winning the first set against Serena Williams, but ran out of gas at 3–3 in the second set, losing nine games in a row to lose the championship.

== All matches ==
=== Singles matches ===
Tournament	Match #	Round	Opponent	Rank	Result	Score
Shenzhen Open; Shenzhen, China; WTA International; Hard, outdoor 31 December 2012 – 6 January 2013	1	1R	(Luxembourg) Mandy Minella	#77	Win	6–4, 6–0
Shenzhen Open; Shenzhen, China; WTA International; Hard, outdoor 31 December 2012 – 6 January 2013	2	2R	(United States) Julia Cohen	#129	Win	6–3, 6–4
Shenzhen Open; Shenzhen, China; WTA International; Hard, outdoor 31 December 2012 – 6 January 2013	3	QF	(Serbia) Bojana Jovanovski	#56	Win	6–3, 6–3
Shenzhen Open; Shenzhen, China; WTA International; Hard, outdoor 31 December 2012 – 6 January 2013	4	SF	(China) Peng Shuai	#40	Win	6–4, 6–0
Shenzhen Open; Shenzhen, China; WTA International; Hard, outdoor 31 December 2012 – 6 January 2013	5	F	(Czech Republic) Klára Zakopalová	#28	Win	6–3, 1–6, 7–5
Apia International; Sydney, Australia; WTA Premier; Hard, outdoor 7–13 January 2013	6	1R	(United States) Christina McHale	#36	Win	7–6^{(7–2)}, 7–5
Apia International; Sydney, Australia; WTA Premier; Hard, outdoor 7–13 January 2013	7	2R	(Japan) Ayumi Morita	#81	Win	6–1, 6–0
Apia International; Sydney, Australia; WTA Premier; Hard, outdoor 7–13 January 2013	8	QF	(United States) Madison Keys	#135	Win	4–6, 7–6^{(7–2)}, 6–2
Apia International; Sydney, Australia; WTA Premier; Hard, outdoor 7–13 January 2013	9	SF	(Poland) Agnieszka Radwańska	#4	Loss	4–6, 3–6
Australian Open; Melbourne, Australia; Grand Slam; Hard, outdoor 14–27 January 2013	10	1R	(Kazakhstan) Sesil Karatantcheva	#113	Win	6–1, 6–3
Australian Open; Melbourne, Australia; Grand Slam; Hard, outdoor 14–27 January 2013	11	2R	(Belarus) Olga Govortsova	#58	Win	6–2, 7–5
Australian Open; Melbourne, Australia; Grand Slam; Hard, outdoor 14–27 January 2013	12	3R	(Romania) Sorana Cîrstea	#28	Win	6–4, 6–1
Australian Open; Melbourne, Australia; Grand Slam; Hard, outdoor 14–27 January 2013	13	4R	(Germany) Julia Görges	#18	Win	7–6^{(8–6)}, 6–1
Australian Open; Melbourne, Australia; Grand Slam; Hard, outdoor 14–27 January 2013	14	QF	(Poland) Agnieszka Radwańska	#4	Win	7–5, 6–3
Australian Open; Melbourne, Australia; Grand Slam; Hard, outdoor 14–27 January 2013	15	SF	(Russia) Maria Sharapova	#2	Win	6–2, 6–2
Australian Open; Melbourne, Australia; Grand Slam; Hard, outdoor 14–27 January 2013	16	F	(Belarus) Victoria Azarenka	#1	Loss	6–4, 4–6, 3–6
Qatar Total Open; Doha, Qatar; WTA Premier 5 Hard, outdoor 11–17 February 2013	Withdrew					
Dubai Tennis Championships; Dubai, United Arab Emirates; WTA Premier; Hard, outdoor 18–24 February 2013	Withdrew					
BNP Paribas Open; Indian Wells, United States; WTA Premier Mandatory; Hard, outdoor 4–17 March 2013	Withdrew					
Sony Open Tennis; Miami, United States; WTA Premier Mandatory; Hard, outdoor 18–31 March 2013	–	1R	Bye			
Sony Open Tennis; Miami, United States; WTA Premier Mandatory; Hard, outdoor 18–31 March 2013	17	2R	(Netherlands) Kiki Bertens	#42	Win	6–3, 6–1
Sony Open Tennis; Miami, United States; WTA Premier Mandatory; Hard, outdoor 18–31 March 2013	18	3R	(United States) Varvara Lepchenko	#29	Win	6–2, 6–4
Sony Open Tennis; Miami, United States; WTA Premier Mandatory; Hard, outdoor 18–31 March 2013	19	4R	(Spain) Garbiñe Muguruza	#73	Win	7–6^{(8–6)}, 6–2
Sony Open Tennis; Miami, United States; WTA Premier Mandatory; Hard, outdoor 18–31 March 2013	20	QF	(United States) Serena Williams	#1	Loss	3–6, 6–7^{(5–7)}
Porsche Tennis Grand Prix; Stuttgart, Germany; WTA Premier; Clay, indoor 22–28 April 2013	–	1R	Bye			
Porsche Tennis Grand Prix; Stuttgart, Germany; WTA Premier; Clay, indoor 22–28 April 2013	21	2R	(Croatia) Mirjana Lučić-Baroni	#103	Win	6–1, 6–2
Porsche Tennis Grand Prix; Stuttgart, Germany; WTA Premier; Clay, indoor 22–28 April 2013	22	QF	(Czech Republic) Petra Kvitová	#8	Win	6–3, 7–5
Porsche Tennis Grand Prix; Stuttgart, Germany; WTA Premier; Clay, indoor 22–28 April 2013	23	SF	(United States) Bethanie Mattek-Sands	#104	Win	6–4, 6–3
Porsche Tennis Grand Prix; Stuttgart, Germany; WTA Premier; Clay, indoor 22–28 April 2013	24	F	(Russia) Maria Sharapova	#2	Loss	4–6, 3–6
Mutua Madrid Open; Madrid, Spain; WTA Premier Mandatory; Clay, outdoor 6–12 May 2013	25	1R	(United States) Madison Keys	#62	Loss	3–6, 2–6
Internazionali BNL d'Italia; Rome, Italy; WTA Premier 5 Clay, outdoor 13–19 May 2013	–	1R	Bye			
Internazionali BNL d'Italia; Rome, Italy; WTA Premier 5 Clay, outdoor 13–19 May 2013	26	2R	(China) Zheng Jie	#50	Win	6–3, 6–1
Internazionali BNL d'Italia; Rome, Italy; WTA Premier 5 Clay, outdoor 13–19 May 2013	27	3R	(Serbia) Jelena Janković	#18	Loss	6–7^{(2–7)}, 5–7
French Open; Paris, France; Grand Slam; Clay, outdoor 26–9 June 2013	28	1R	(Spain) Anabel Medina Garrigues	#68	Win	6–3, 6–4
French Open; Paris, France; Grand Slam; Clay, outdoor 26–9 June 2013	29	2R	(United States) Bethanie Mattek-Sands	#62	Loss	7–5, 3–6, 2–6
Aegon International; Eastbourne, United Kingdom; WTA Premier; Grass, outdoor 17–22 June 2013	30	1R	(France) Alizé Cornet	#30	Win	6–2, 6–4
Aegon International; Eastbourne, United Kingdom; WTA Premier; Grass, outdoor 17–22 June 2013	–	2R	(France) Marion Bartoli	#15	Walkover	N/A
Aegon International; Eastbourne, United Kingdom; WTA Premier; Grass, outdoor 17–22 June 2013	31	QF	(Russia) Elena Vesnina	#36	Loss	6–7^{(4–7)}, 3–6
Wimbledon Championships; London, United Kingdom; Grand Slam; Grass, outdoor 24 June – 7 July 2013	32	1R	(Netherlands) Michaëlla Krajicek	#575	Win	6–1, 6–1
Wimbledon Championships; London, United Kingdom; Grand Slam; Grass, outdoor 24 June – 7 July 2013	33	2R	(Romania) Simona Halep	#43	Win	6–2, 1–6, 6–0
Wimbledon Championships; London, United Kingdom; Grand Slam; Grass, outdoor 24 June – 7 July 2013	34	3R	(Czech Republic) Klára Zakopalová	#32	Win	4–6, 6–0, 8–6
Wimbledon Championships; London, United Kingdom; Grand Slam; Grass, outdoor 24 June – 7 July 2013	35	4R	(Italy) Roberta Vinci	#11	Win	6–2, 6–0
Wimbledon Championships; London, United Kingdom; Grand Slam; Grass, outdoor 24 June – 7 July 2013	36	QF	(Poland) Agnieszka Radwańska	#4	Loss	6–7^{(5–7)}, 6–4, 2–6
Rogers Cup; Toronto, Canada; WTA Premier 5 Hard, outdoor 5–11 August 2013	–	1R	Bye			
Rogers Cup; Toronto, Canada; WTA Premier 5 Hard, outdoor 5–11 August 2013	37	2R	(Russia) Anastasia Pavlyuchenkova	#31	Win	6–1, 6–4
Rogers Cup; Toronto, Canada; WTA Premier 5 Hard, outdoor 5–11 August 2013	38	3R	(Serbia) Ana Ivanovic	#15	Win	3–6, 6–1, 7–6^{(7–5)}
Rogers Cup; Toronto, Canada; WTA Premier 5 Hard, outdoor 5–11 August 2013	39	QF	(Slovakia) Dominika Cibulková	#20	Win	7–6^{(7–1)}, 6–2
Rogers Cup; Toronto, Canada; WTA Premier 5 Hard, outdoor 5–11 August 2013	40	SF	(Romania) Sorana Cîrstea	#27	Loss	1–6, 6–7^{(5–7)}
Western & Southern Open; Cincinnati, United States; WTA Premier 5 Hard, outdoor 12–19 August 2013	–	1R	Bye			
Western & Southern Open; Cincinnati, United States; WTA Premier 5 Hard, outdoor 12–19 August 2013	41	2R	(United States) Lauren Davis	#76	Win	4–6, 6–1, 6–1
Western & Southern Open; Cincinnati, United States; WTA Premier 5 Hard, outdoor 12–19 August 2013	42	3R	(Germany) Angelique Kerber	#8	Win	6–4, 6–4
Western & Southern Open; Cincinnati, United States; WTA Premier 5 Hard, outdoor 12–19 August 2013	–	QF	(Poland) Agnieszka Radwańska	#4	Walkover	N/A
Western & Southern Open; Cincinnati, United States; WTA Premier 5 Hard, outdoor 12–19 August 2013	43	SF	(United States) Serena Williams	#1	Loss	5–7, 5–7
US Open; New York City, United States; Grand Slam; Hard, outdoor 26 August – 9 September 2013	44	1R	(Belarus) Olga Govortsova	#88	Win	6–2, 6–2
US Open; New York City, United States; Grand Slam; Hard, outdoor 26 August – 9 September 2013	45	2R	(Sweden) Sofia Arvidsson	#100	Win	6–2, 6–2
US Open; New York City, United States; Grand Slam; Hard, outdoor 26 August – 9 September 2013	46	3R	(United Kingdom) Laura Robson	#32	Win	6–2, 7–5
US Open; New York City, United States; Grand Slam; Hard, outdoor 26 August – 9 September 2013	47	4R	(Serbia) Jelena Janković	#12	Win	6–3, 6–0
US Open; New York City, United States; Grand Slam; Hard, outdoor 26 August – 9 September 2013	48	QF	(Russia) Ekaterina Makarova	#24	Win	6–4, 6–7^{(5–7)}, 6–2
US Open; New York City, United States; Grand Slam; Hard, outdoor 26 August – 9 September 2013	49	SF	(United States) Serena Williams	#1	Loss	0–6, 3–6
China Open; Beijing, China; WTA Premier Mandatory; Hard, outdoor 28 September – 6 October 2013	50	1R	(Slovakia) Daniela Hantuchová	#31	Win	6–0, 6–4
China Open; Beijing, China; WTA Premier Mandatory; Hard, outdoor 28 September – 6 October 2013	51	2R	(Serbia) Bojana Jovanovski	#39	Win	6–0, 6–1
China Open; Beijing, China; WTA Premier Mandatory; Hard, outdoor 28 September – 6 October 2013	52	3R	(Germany) Sabine Lisicki	#16	Win	7–5, 6–4
China Open; Beijing, China; WTA Premier Mandatory; Hard, outdoor 28 September – 6 October 2013	53	QF	(Czech Republic) Petra Kvitová	#7	Loss	6–4, 2–6, 4–6
WTA Tour Championships; Istanbul, Turkey; WTA Tour Championships; Hard, indoor 21–27 October 2013	54	RR	(Italy) Sara Errani	#7	Win	6–3, 7–6^{(7–5)}
WTA Tour Championships; Istanbul, Turkey; WTA Tour Championships; Hard, indoor 21–27 October 2013	55	RR	(Serbia) Jelena Janković	#8	Win	6–3, 2–6, 6–3
WTA Tour Championships; Istanbul, Turkey; WTA Tour Championships; Hard, indoor 21–27 October 2013	56	RR	(Belarus) Victoria Azarenka	#2	Win	6–2, 6–1
WTA Tour Championships; Istanbul, Turkey; WTA Tour Championships; Hard, indoor 21–27 October 2013	57	SF	(Czech Republic) Petra Kvitová	#6	Win	6–4, 6–2
WTA Tour Championships; Istanbul, Turkey; WTA Tour Championships; Hard, indoor 21–27 October 2013	58	F	(United States) Serena Williams	#1	Loss	6–2, 3–6, 0–6

== Tournament schedule ==
=== Singles schedule ===
Li Na's 2013 singles tournament schedule is as follows:

Date	Championship	Location	Category	Surface	Prev. result	Prev. points	New points	Outcome
30 December 2012– 6 January 2013	Shenzhen Open	Shenzhen (CHN)	WTA International	Hard	N/A	0	280	Winner defeated Klára Zakopalová, 6–3, 1–6, 7–5
7 January 2013– 13 January 2013	Apia International	Sydney (AUS)	WTA Premier	Hard	F	320	200	Semifinals lost to Agnieszka Radwańska, 3–6, 4–6
14 January 2013– 27 January 2013	Australian Open	Melbourne (AUS)	Grand Slam	Hard	4R	280	1400	Final lost to Victoria Azarenka, 6–4, 4–6, 3–6
11 February 2013– 17 February 2013	Qatar Total Open	Doha (QAT)	WTA Premier 5	Hard	DNP	0	0	Withdrew due to a left ankle injury
18 February 2013– 23 February 2013	Dubai Tennis Championships	Dubai (UAE)	WTA Premier	Hard	DNP	0	0	Withdrew due to a left ankle injury
4 March 2013– 17 March 2013	BNP Paribas Open	Indian Wells (USA)	WTA Premier Mandatory	Hard	QF	250	0	Withdrew due to a left ankle injury
18 March 2013– 31 March 2013	Sony Ericsson Open	Miami (USA)	WTA Premier Mandatory	Hard	QF	250	250	Quarterfinals lost to Serena Williams, 3–6, 6–7^{(5–7)}
22 April 2013– 28 April 2013	Porsche Tennis Grand Prix	Stuttgart (GER)	WTA Premier	Clay (i)	QF	120	320	Final lost to Maria Sharapova, 4–6, 3–6
6 May 2013– 12 May 2013	Mutua Madrid Open	Madrid (ESP)	WTA Premier Mandatory	Clay	QF	250	5	First round lost to Madison Keys, 2–6, 3–6
13 May 2013– 19 May 2013	Internazionali BNL d'Italia	Rome (ITA)	WTA Premier 5	Clay	F	620	125	Third round lost to Jelena Janković, 6–7^{(2–7)}, 5–7
26 May 2013– 9 June 2013	French Open	Paris (FRA)	Grand Slam	Clay	4R	280	100	Second round lost to Bethanie Mattek-Sands, 7–5, 3–6, 2–6
17 June 2013– 22 June 2013	Aegon International	Eastbourne (GBR)	WTA Premier	Grass	DNP	0	120	Quarterfinals lost to Elena Vesnina, 6–7^{(4–7)}, 3–6
23 June 2013– 7 July 2013	Wimbledon	London (GBR)	Grand Slam	Grass	2R	100	500	Quarterfinals lost to Agnieszka Radwańska, 6–7^{(5–7)}, 6–4, 2–6
5 August 2013– 11 August 2013	Rogers Cup	Toronto (CAN)	WTA Premier 5	Hard	F	620	395	Semifinals lost to Sorana Cîrstea, 1–6, 6–7^{(5–7)}
12 August 2013– 18 August 2013	Western & Southern Open	Cincinnati (USA)	WTA Premier 5	Hard	W	900	395	Semifinals lost to Serena Williams, 5–7, 5–7
26 August 2013– 9 September 2013	US Open	New York City (USA)	Grand Slam	Hard	3R	160	900	Semifinals lost to Serena Williams, 0–6, 3–6
28 September 2013– 6 October 2013	China Open	Beijing (CHN)	WTA Premier Mandatory	Hard	SF	450	250	Quarterfinals lost to Petra Kvitová, 6–4, 2–6, 4–6
21 October 2013– 27 October 2013	WTA Tour Championships	Istanbul (TUR)	WTA Tour Championships	Hard (i)	RR	370	1050	Final lost to Serena Williams, 6–2, 3–6, 0–6
Total year-end points							6045	

== Yearly records ==
=== Head-to-head matchups ===
Bold indicates that the player was in the Top 10, italics denotes that the player was in the Top 20 (at the time of the match being played). This list is ordered by number of wins to number of losses in chronological order played.

- (Czech Republic) Klára Zakopalová 2–0
- (Belarus) Olga Govortsova 2–0
- (Serbia) Bojana Jovanovski 2–0
- (Serbia) **Jelena Janković** 2–1
- (Czech Republic) **Petra Kvitová** 2–1
- (United States) Christina McHale 1–0
- (Luxembourg) Mandy Minella 1–0
- (United States) Julia Cohen 1–0
- (China) Peng Shuai 1–0
- (Japan) Ayumi Morita 1–0
- (Kazakhstan) Sesil Karatantcheva 1–0
- (Germany) Julia Görges 1–0
- (Netherlands) Kiki Bertens 1–0
- (United States) Varvara Lepchenko 1–0
- (Spain) Garbiñe Muguruza 1–0
- (Croatia) Mirjana Lučić-Baroni 1–0
- (China) Zheng Jie 1–0
- (Spain) Anabel Medina Garrigues 1–0
- (France) Alizé Cornet 1–0
- (Netherlands) Michaëlla Krajicek 1–0
- (Romania) Simona Halep 1–0
- (Italy) Roberta Vinci 1–0
- (Russia) Anastasia Pavlyuchenkova 1–0
- (Serbia) Ana Ivanovic 1–0
- (Slovakia) Dominika Cibulková 1–0
- (United States) Lauren Davis 1–0
- (Germany) **Angelique Kerber** 1–0
- (Sweden) Sofia Arvidsson 1–0
- (United Kingdom) Laura Robson 1–0
- (Russia) Ekaterina Makarova 1–0
- (Slovakia) Daniela Hantuchová 1–0
- (Germany) Sabine Lisicki 1–0
- (Italy) **Sara Errani** 1–0
- (Belarus) **Victoria Azarenka** 1–1
- (United States) Madison Keys 1–1
- (Romania) Sorana Cîrstea 1–1
- (Russia) **Maria Sharapova** 1–1
- (United States) Bethanie Mattek-Sands 1–1
- (Poland) **Agnieszka Radwańska** 1–2
- (Russia) Elena Vesnina 0–1
- (United States) **Serena Williams** 0–4

=== Finals ===
==== Singles: 4 (1–3) ====
Legend WTA Grand Slams (0–1) WTA Tour Championships (0–1) WTA Premier Mandatory (0–0) WTA Premier 5 (0–0) WTA Premier (0–1) International (1–0)	Finals by surface Hard (1–2) Clay (0–1)	Finals by venue Outdoors (1–1) Indoors (0–2)

Outcome	No.	Date	Tournament	Surface	Opponent	Score
Winner	7.	6 January 2013	Shenzhen, China	Hard	(Czech Republic) Klára Zakopalová	6–3, 1–6, 7–5
Runner-up	9.	26 January 2013	Melbourne, Australia	Hard	(Belarus) Victoria Azarenka	6–4, 4–6, 4–6
Runner-up	10.	28 April 2013	Stuttgart, Germany	Clay (i)	(Russia) Maria Sharapova	4–6, 3–6
Runner-up	11.	27 October 2013	Istanbul, Turkey	Hard (i)	(United States) Serena Williams	6–2, 3–6, 0–6

=== Earnings ===
#	Event	Prize money	Year-to-date
1	**Shenzhen Open**	$112,080	$112,080
2	Apia International	$32,830	$144,910
3	Australian Open	$1,220,969	$1,365,879
4	Sony Open Tennis	$90,250	$1,456,129
5	Porsche Tennis Grand Prix	$68,200	$1,524,329
6	Mutua Madrid Open	$12,268	$1,536,597
7	Internazionali BNL d'Italia	$24,300	$1,560,897
8	French Open	$43,640	$1,604,537
9	Aegon International	$17,850	$1,622,387
10	Wimbledon	$320,869	$1,943,256
11	Rogers Cup	$104,700	$2,047,956
12	Western & Southern Open	$104,700	$2,152,656
13	US Open	$638,929	$2,791,585
14	China Open	$100,900	$2,892,485
15	WTA Tour Championships	$1,090,000	$3,982,485
			$3,982,485

Figures in United States dollars (USD) unless noted.

== See also ==
- 2013 Victoria Azarenka tennis season
- 2013 Serena Williams tennis season
- 2013 WTA Tour
