= 2013 Serena Williams tennis season =

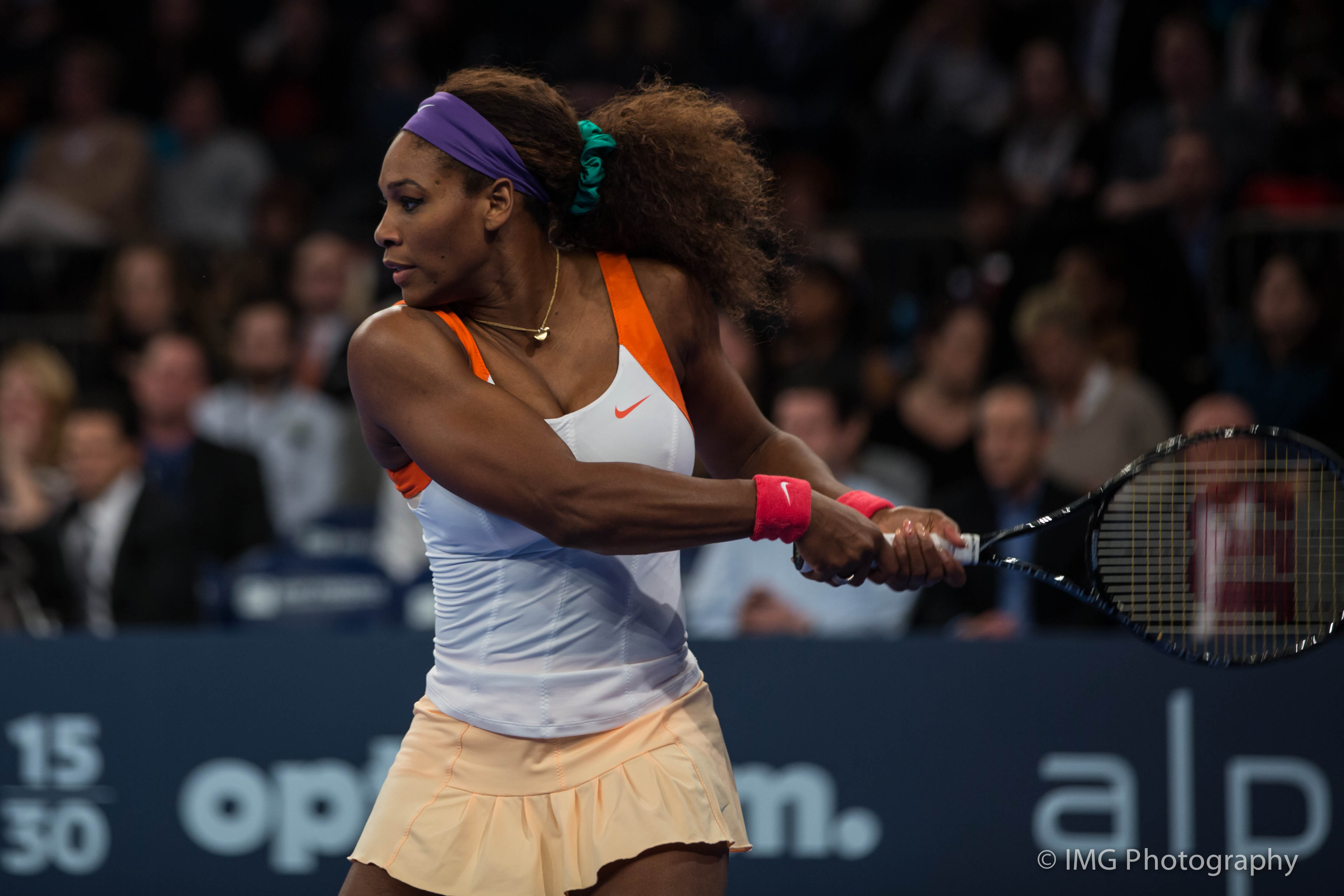
- Williams at the BNP Paribas Showdown
- Full name: Serena Jameka Williams
- Country: United States
- Calendar prize money: $12,385,572

Singles
- Season record: 78–4
- Calendar titles: 11
- Year-end ranking: No. 1
- Ranking change from previous year: ▲2

Grand Slam & significant results
- Australian Open: QF
- French Open: W
- Wimbledon: 4R
- US Open: W
- Tour Finals: W

Doubles
- Season record: 7–3
- Year-end ranking: No. 64
- Ranking change from previous year: ▼30

Grand Slam doubles results
- Australian Open: QF
- US Open: SF
- Last updated on: 28 October 2013.

The 2013 Serena Williams tennis season officially began on 30 December 2012 with the start of the 2013 WTA Tour. Williams produced the most consistent season of her career, reaching 13 finals and winning 11 titles, the most since Martina Hingis won 12 titles in 1997. She also won her second French Open, her first since 2002, as well as her fifth US Open. Williams dominated the clay court season, winning five titles and all 28 of her matches on the surface to produce her career-best winning streak at 34. She had a winning percentage of 95.1%, the highest since 1990, and became the first women's player to eclipse the US$10 million prize money mark at US$12,385,572. Williams finished the year as the world No. 1 for the third time in her career. For her performance in the 2013 season, she was named ITF World Champion for the fourth time and the second time in a row.

== Year in detail ==
=== Early hard court season and Australian Open ===
==== Brisbane International ====
Williams began her 2013 campaign at the Brisbane International. In her first match, she faced compatriot and second-ranked American Varvara Lepchenko and won in straight sets in 59 minutes. In the second round, she faced Frenchwoman Alizé Cornet and took the match, winning both sets at two in exactly an hour with the help of 6 aces. In the quarterfinals, Williams faced another American in Sloane Stephens and defeated her younger foe, breaking Stephens once in each set, while holding her serve at each time. In the semifinals Williams was bound to face world no. 1 Victoria Azarenka; however, the Belarusian withdrew before the match with a toe injury, giving Williams a free bye into the final. In the final, Williams faced Russian Anastasia Pavlyuchenkova; the match started with holds in the first four games but Williams then took seven games in a row before Pavlyuchenkova took another game. Williams then closed out the match, losing only three games.

==== Australian Open ====
Williams came into the Australian Open as the heavy favorite to win the title; she was coming in with a 17-match winning streak that stretched from the 2012 US Open and a 21-set winning streak stretching from the third set of the US Open final. In the first round, she faced Edina Gallovits-Hall, where Williams suffered a health scare when she twisted her right ankle in the fifth game of the first set, however it did not hamper her as she won without dropping a game. In the next round she faced Garbiñe Muguruza and suffered another incident, when Williams's hit smacked her mouth with her racket following through on a defensive lob. Williams broke in the first game and also in the seventh game to win the first set; she then cruised through the second set with a bagel. In the third round, against Japanese Ayumi Morita, she served her second 207 km/h serve of the tournament. Williams roared through the first set losing only one game, Morita then took the first three games, Williams then won the last six games to win the match. Williams then faced 14th seed, Russia's Maria Kirilenko. Williams broke in the fourth and eighth games of the match to take the first set; she served 95% of first serve in the set. Williams stormed past the second set with a bagel to advance to the quarterfinals. Williams at one point won 23 straight service points. Williams also made 22 winners with 6 aces to Kirilenko's 7 winners with 1 ace, she also only made 6 unforced errors to Kirilenko's 15 In the quarterfinals she faced compatriot Sloane Stephens; Williams took the first set by breaking in the eighth game. Williams then suffered a back spasm in the middle of the second set, where she led by a break but eventually lost the set 5–7. In the third set, Williams led by a break by the seventh game but eventually lost the next 3 games, losing to Stephens. Both women, made 23 winners; however, Williams made more unforced errors with 48 to Stephens 39. She also ended her 20-match winning streak and her 30 sets won in a row.

Serena Williams also played doubles with sister Venus. In the first three rounds, they faced Camila Giorgi and Stefanie Vögele, Vera Dushevina and Olga Govortsova, and fifth seeds Nadia Petrova and Katarina Srebotnik winning in straight sets in all three victories. In the quarterfinals, they faced top seeds Roberta Vinci and Sara Errani, they took the first set and served for the match at 6–5, until they eventual lost the seconds set in a tie-break. They also had many chances in the third but lost it in the end 5–7.

==== Qatar Total Open ====
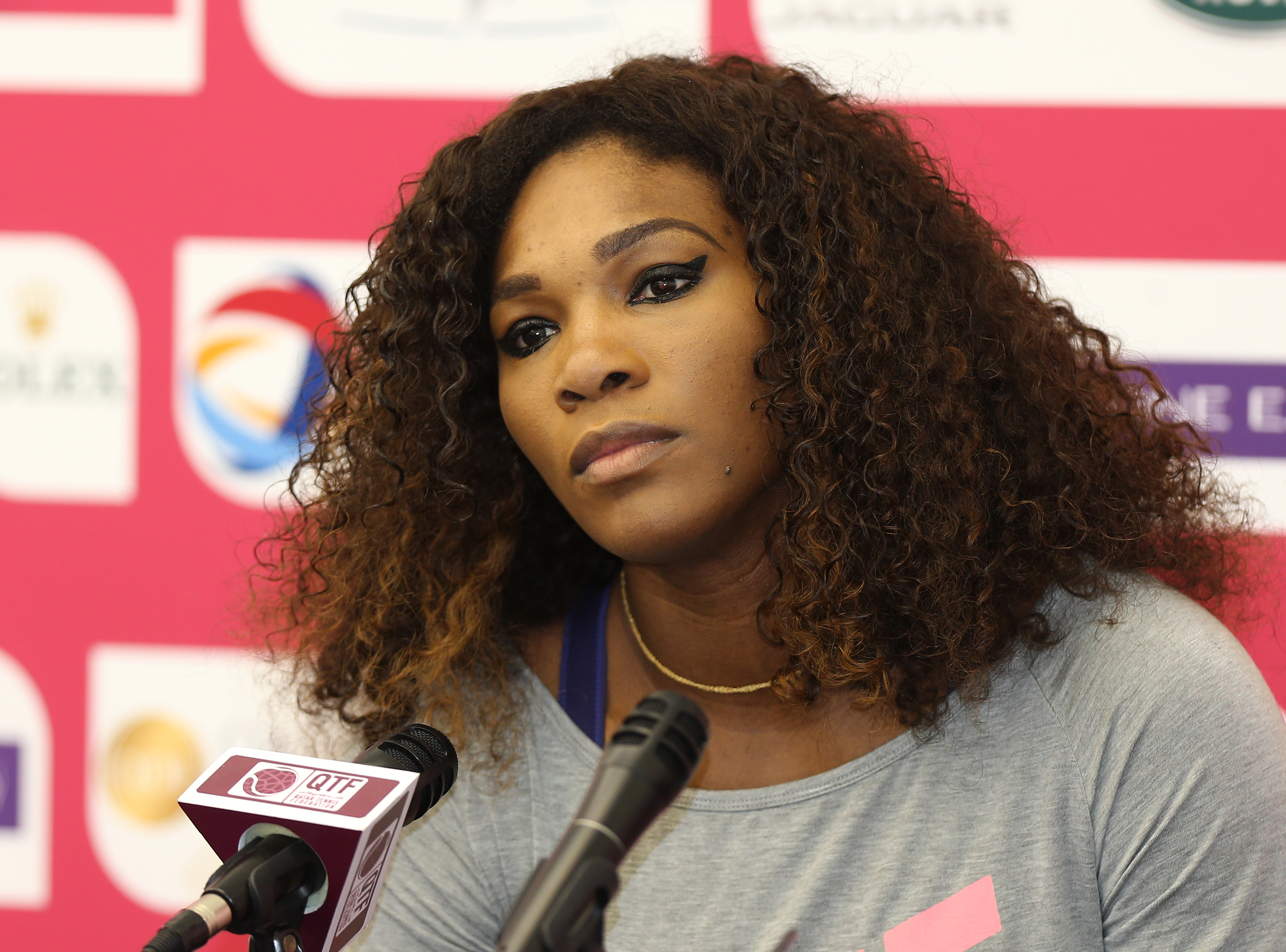
Serena Williams at the Doha press conference

"I'm so sensitive nowadays, I'm always crying! I never thought I would be here again. I've just been through so much and never thought I'd be here again. Thank you Jehovah for giving me another chance."

— Williams during her on court interview after defeating Kvitova and reclaiming the world no.1 status.

Williams then played at the Qatar Total Open in Doha for the first time. Williams, being seeded second, received a bye in the first round. In the second round, she faced a lucky loser in Russian Daria Gavrilova. Williams from the fifth game racked in nine straight games, Williams served out the match, she hit 25 winners to Gavrilova's 9, and both hit 14 unforced errors. In the second round she faced the younger Radwańska Urszula, Williams won the first eight games, before being broken by Radwańska. Williams closed it out in the ninth game of the second set. Williams had a 20–15 winner-unforced error to Radwańska's 6–20. In the quarterfinals she faced world no. 8 Petra Kvitová, Kvitová took the first break in the sixth game and took advantage, winning the set, the first set Williams has lost to Kvitová. The second set went Williams' favor as she broke in the eighth game closed it out. In the deciding set Kvitová took a break lead by the fifth game. However Williams came back to win the set 7–5. Williams made 14 aces to Kvitová's 9, both served 8 double faults. Williams made 37 winners to Kvitová's 35, but she also made more unforced errors 31 to 28. This win gave Williams the WTA number 1 ranking, becoming the oldest to hold it. In the semifinals, Williams faced world no. 3 Maria Sharapova. Williams took the first set after breaking in the sixth game. Williams then dominated the second set, breaking the Russian twice to win it. In the final, Williams faced the top seed Victoria Azarenka, Williams went down by a break, but came back, eventually led to a tie-break. Williams had set point on serve at 6–5, but lost the next three points to lose the breaker. Williams then took control of the second set winning it with two breaks. In the third set, Williams started slowly, losing the first three games, and it was enough for Azarenka as they both held serve until the end of the match. This loss was the first to Azarenka since the 2009 Sony Ericsson Open and ended Williams' 9-match winning streak against Azarenka.

==== Dubai Tennis Championships ====
Williams withdrew 45 minutes before she was due to play Marion Bartoli at the Dubai Tennis Championships with a back injury. This withdrawal will count as a zero-pointer in her allotted year-end rankings.

==== Sony Open Tennis ====
Playing in her first tournament as the world no. 1 at the Sony Open Tennis as the top seed she received a bye into the second round where she faced Italian Flavia Pennetta. Williams took the first set with a loss of one game; she come back from triple break point down twice and she was 2/10 in break point opportunities. The second set was won by Williams by the same score. Williams then took on Ayumi Morita, Morita took the first 3 games of the match, but Williams pegged back taking the next 7 games, Williams then broke Morita in the sixth game of the second set to take the match. In the fourth round, she faced Slovak Dominika Cibulková, the match started with 2 breaks, Cibulková then took the next seven games from the fourth game, to take a set and break lead. Williams then took the next six games from, in the process winning the second set. Williams then completed her comeback, winning the third by 2. Williams ended with 40–41 winners-unforced errors to her opponents 12–19 ratio. In the quarterfinals, Williams faced Li Na. Williams took the first set breaking Li in the sixth game of the match. In the second set Williams took a break lead but Li took the next five games and had a set point on the Williams serve, Williams saved the set point and took the next four games to force a tie-break, that went to Williams. In the semifinals, she faced fourth seed and defending champion Agnieszka Radwańska. Williams took the first set without dropping a game. In the second set Williams broke Radwańska in the third game to finally take the set and the match. She hit 40 winners and 21 unforced errors to Radwańska's 6 winners and 12 unforced errors. Williams made 12 aces including 5 in the third game of the second set. In the final Williams faced Maria Sharapova. Sharapova got the decisive break in the ninth game and serve the set out. This ended the 13 straight sets Williams had won over Sharapova and the first she had lost in 5 years. In the second set, Williams won the first two games before Sharapova reeled off three straight games herself. Being a break down Williams reeled off 10 straight games to win the match. Williams had a 34–29 winners-to-unforced errors ratio to Sharapova's 14–25. This win gave Williams the most titles at the tournament at six and most wins at the event at 61 and is tied with Agassi in both accolades. This win also meant that Williams has beaten Sharapova 11 straight times.

=== Clay court season and French Open ===
==== Family Circle Cup ====
Williams then played her first clay court tournament at the Family Circle Cup. She entered the event as the defending champion and as the first seed. Williams received a bye to go through the second round, where she faced Camila Giorgi. Williams won the first set with Giorgi breaking and winning serve only once. In the second set, Williams broke in the fifth game and ninth game of the match to advance. Williams made nine aces and no double faults, whereas her opponent made five aces to a dozen double faults. On the following day, she faced compatriot Mallory Burdette, the first set went on serve until Williams broke in the tenth game to take the set. Williams then got broken in the first game, but came back winning six of the last seven games to win. Later in the day Williams played her quarterfinal match, playing two singles match in the same day for the first time in her career. Williams took on Lucie Šafářová in a rematch of last year's final. The match began with two breaks, Šafářová then broke in the fifth game and then consolidated the break. However, Williams came back winning 10 of the last 11 games to go through. In the semifinals Williams faced big sister Venus Williams in their 24 meeting and their first in more than three years, with their last match coming in the 2009 WTA Tour Championships Final. The first set went to Serena, with Serena breaking Venus thrice in the set, with she her herself getting broken once. In the second set, Serena broke Venus' serve in the first and seventh game to advance to the final. The match was the fewest games won by the losing foe with three in all of the 24 meeting between the sisters. In the final, Williams faced Jelena Janković, whom she had led 5–4 in head-to-head. The first set, four games stayed on serve with Williams not dropping a point and Janković being pushed to deuce. However, things turned around as Janković broke Williams in the fifth and ninth game to take the set. The second set saw Williams rallied to take all of the six games to win it with a bagel. The third set went to Williams breaking Janković in the third and seventh game and served out the match in her third match point. Williams was 39–25 winners to unforced errors to Janković 21–23. This is Williams third Family Circle Cup and extends her 15-match winning streak at the event.

==== Mutua Madrid Open ====
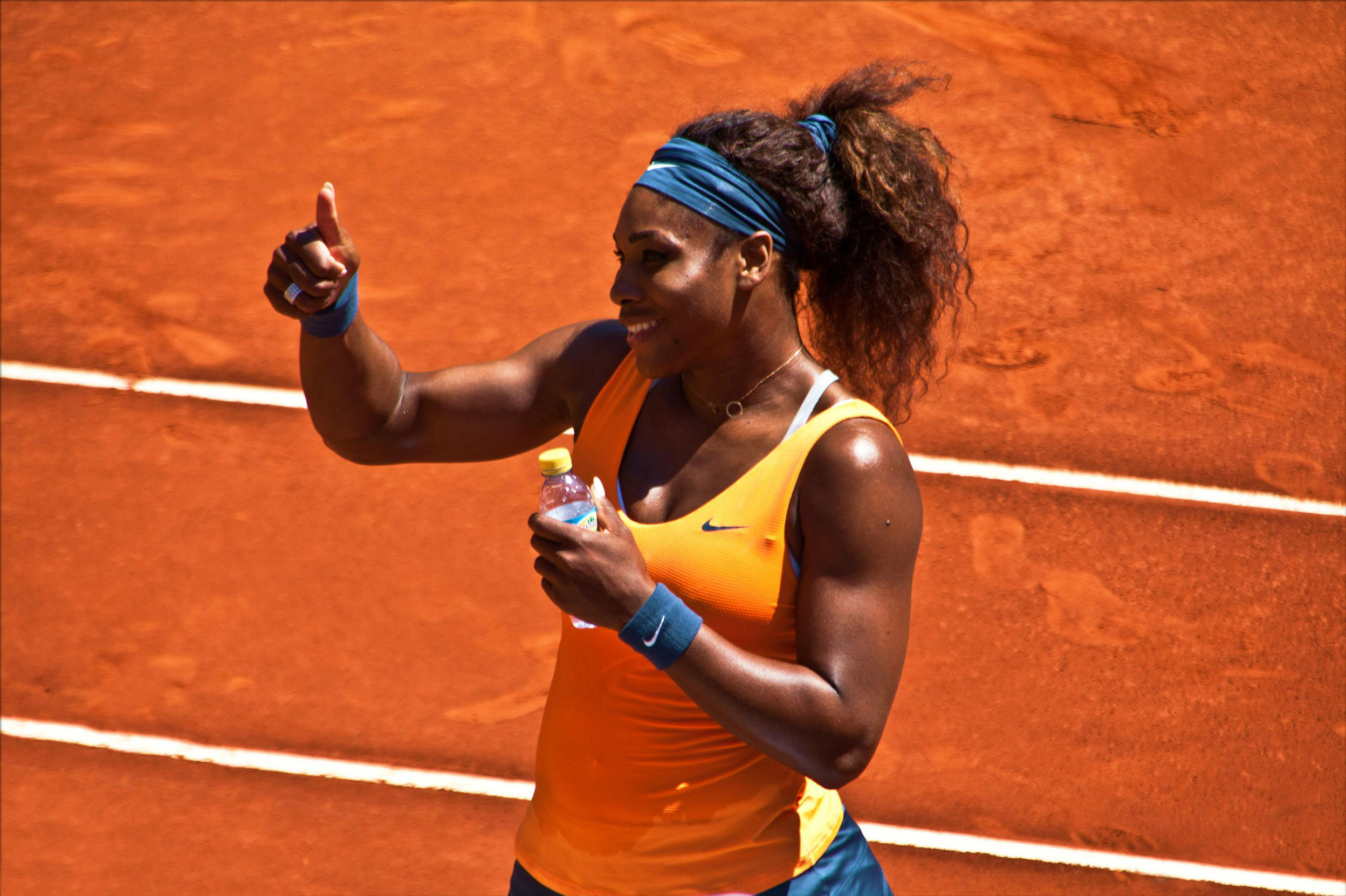
Serena Williams at the Mutua Madrid Open.

Williams came into the Mutua Madrid Open as the defending champion. Williams began her defense against Yulia Putintseva. Putintseva broke Williams in the opening game; Williams then broke back in the sixth game. The opening set then went to a tie-break, with Williams winning it. In the second set, Williams broke serve four times, while getting broken once herself to win the second set with a breadstick to win the match. In the following round, Williams went against local Lourdes Domínguez Lino. Williams took an early lead in the first set and served for it in the seventh game just to be broken, but broke back to take the set. In the second set, they went toe-to-toe, where Williams sneaked ahead, breaking in the twelfth game to win the match. In the round of 16, Williams faced 13th seed Maria Kirilenko. Both held serves in the first six games, until Williams raced through, winning nine of the last ten games. Williams made 22 winners and 10 unforced errors to Kirilenko's 9 and 25. Williams lost 2 points on serve, both on the second serve, and made no unforced errors in the second set. In the last 8, Williams took on wild card Anabel Medina Garrigues; the first set went on serve until Williams broke in the eighth game and then served it out. In the second set, Medina Garrigues took advantage of an erratic Williams taking the second set in a bagel. Williams took the first two games of the final set just to see Medina Garrigues take the next four; however, Williams came back and won the set in the twelfth game. Williams made 39 winners to 48 unforced errors to Medina Garrigues' 19 and 18. In the semifinals, Williams faced Sara Errani. Errani broke twice in the third and seventh game just to see Williams break back right after. Williams then broke in a hard-fought game in the twelfth game to take the set. Williams then broke Errani in the fourth game and then in the eighth game to advance to the final. Williams made 47 winners to Errani's 8 and 39 unforced errors to Errani's 13. This marks Williams first red clay final since her triumph in the 2002 French Open. Williams faced 2nd-seed Maria Sharapova in the final, where the winner could take the number 1 ranking. Williams dominated the first set, winning the first four games and eventually closing it out in the seventh game. Sharapova then broke Williams in the opening game but Williams broke back in sixth game and then again in the tenth game to take the match. Williams made 18 winners and unforced errors, while Sharapova made 14 winners to 21 unforced errors. This is Williams' 50th career title and her first on the red clay since the 2002 French Open.

==== Internazionali BNL d'Italia ====
Williams came into the Internazionali BNL d'Italia with a 19-match winning streak and the top seed. She received a bye into the round of 16 and played British number 1 Laura Robson. The match began with Robson breaking Williams; however Williams won 6 of the next 7 games to take the set. Williams then broke serve twice to take a similar scoreline and advance. Williams was 13–11 winners-unforced errors to Robson 16–35. In the next round she took on Dominika Cibulková and dropped only a game in the match and made 40 winners to 16 unforced errors. In the final 8, Williams faced Carla Suárez Navarro. Williams took control of the match losing only two games both in the first set. Williams made 26 winners to 14 unforced errors to the Spaniards 9 winners and 16 unforced errors. In the semifinals, Williams went against surprise semifinalist in qualifier Simona Halep. Halep took an early break in the third game, however Williams came back winning 11 of the last 12 games, including a bagel in the second set to win the match. Williams made 24 winners and 20 unforced errors to Halep's 3 and 17. In the final she faced Victoria Azarenka in a rematch of the Doha final. Williams took the first three games before Azarenka could take a game breaking Williams' serve in the fourth game, Williams then took the next three to win the set. The pair then traded three breaks of serve from the sixth game, before Williams could serve it out in the ninth game and revenge her loss. Williams hit 41 winners and 19 unforced errors in the match along with 8 aces. The win extends Williams longest winning streak in her career to 24.

==== French Open ====
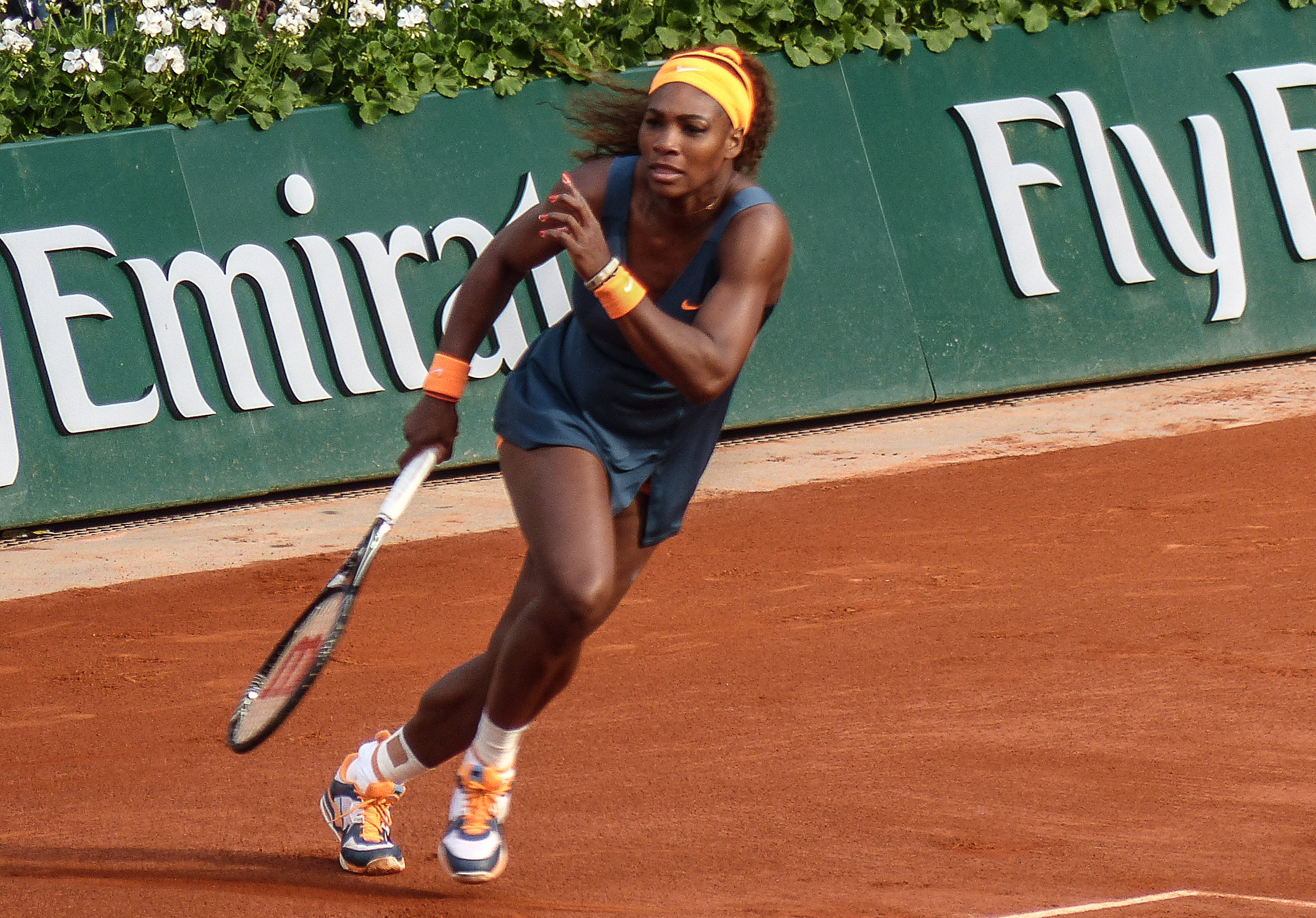
Serena Williams at the French Open against Caroline Garcia.

Williams came into the French Open as the favorite, having not lost a match on clay and riding on a 24 match winning streak. Williams also was the top seed and world no. 1 and would come out of the event as the world no. 1 regardless of the result of the tournament. In her opening match, she went up against Anna Tatishvili, where Williams rallied through to win the first nine games dropping only a point on serve before Tatishvili could get a game. Williams then won the remaining three games to advance. In the next round, Williams faced wildcard Caroline Garcia. Williams won the first five games and finished it off the set in the seventh game and then broke twice in the second to take the match. Williams made 27 winners and 9 unforced errors to her opponents 14 a piece. In the third round, Williams took on Sorana Cîrstea. Williams took the first set in a bagel, the second set went on serve until the fifth game, where Williams won the last four games. Williams was 13–16 on winners and unforced errors. In the round of 16, Williams went against the no. 1 doubles player Roberta Vinci, Williams took the first set, dropping only a game. The second set went on serve until Williams broke in the eighth game and closed it out in the next game to win in straight sets. In the quarterfinals, Williams faced former French Open champion Svetlana Kuznetsova. In the first set, Williams cruised through the set dropping only a game with the aid of 15 winners. However, in the second set, Kuznetsova won the first four games. Kuznetsova then served for the set in the ninth game and was up 40–0, however Williams squandered four break points in the game to bring it to a deciding set. Kuznetsova hit 11 winners to Williams' 8, while hitting the same number of unforced errors. Kuznetsova then broke early and had a chance to take a second break in the 3rd game, however Williams saved three break points to hold. Williams then won 5 of the last 6 game to advance to her first French Open semifinal since 2003. In the semifinals, Williams faced last years runner-up Sara Errani. Williams stormed through the first 9 games before Errani could get her only game of the match. Williams then served it out in the seventh game in a 46-minute white wash, dropping only 5 points on serve. Williams hit 40 winners to her opponents 2 and 15 unforced errors to Errani's 3. Chris Evert described this as the finest female performance on clay she had ever seen. Williams faced defending champion and number 2 seed Maria Sharapova in the final. Williams was broken in the second game, but won four of the next five games to gain the lead. Sharapova then broke back in the eight game before Williams went on to break again to take the set in the tenth game. Williams proceeded to play well breaking Sharapova's serve in the second set before serving for the championship in the tenth game. In this service game, Williams fired 3 aces to win her second French Open title 11 years after her first. Williams hit 29 winners-21 unforced errors-10 aces-0 double faults to Sharapova's 10-17-2-4 in comparison. The win improved Williams' win-streak to a career-longest 31 matches. She became the fourth woman in the Open era after Martina Navratilova, Chris Evert and Steffi Graf to win each Grand Slam title twice or more.

=== Wimbledon ===
Williams came into Wimbledon as the heavy favorite to win her sixth Wimbledon title, being on a 31-match winning streak, number 1 seed, and defending champion. Williams opened her campaign for her 17th slam against Mandy Minella. Williams stormed through the first set dropping only a game and not dropping a point on serve. Minella then came back, winning the first two games of the second set, just to see Williams reel off six of the last seven games to win. In the next round, she took on youngster Caroline Garcia, Williams took the first set by breaking Garcia in the ninth game, then took the second set taking the last four games from 2-all. In the round of 32, Williams faced Japanese veteran Kimiko Date-Krumm. Williams served for the first set in the seventh game, just to get broken. But Williams came back to take the next seven games to win in two sets. In the last 16, Williams had German Sabine Lisicki in her path. Lisicki took the first set at ease dropping only two games as Williams fired back in the second set dropping only a game. Williams then took a 3–0 lead then a 4–2 lead, however Williams got passive, wasting four break points in the 8th game as Lisicki took initiative and took four games in a row to win 6–4 in the third, ending Williams's 34-match winning streak, the longest in her career.

==== Collector Swedish Open ====
After her Wimbledon Loss, Williams came back to clay and played the Collector Swedish Open. Williams played her opening match against Sesil Karatantcheva. Williams won the match with ease dropping only three games in just 64 minutes. In her second round match, Williams took on Anna Tatishvili, Williams cruised to victory in straight sets with help from her seven aces. Williams then faced Spaniard Lourdes Domínguez Lino, demolishing her opponent, Williams won in a double breadstick scoreline. In the final four, Williams had Klára Zakopalová on the other side of the net. Williams dominated the opening, proceeding to take the first 8 games of the match. Zakopalová came back and broke Williams to get on serve up to the 8th game; however, Williams took the last 2 games to reach the final. In the final, Williams took on local Johanna Larsson. Larsson took an early break lead, breaking Williams in the 4th game, just to see Williams reel in 11 of the next 13 games to win the title. This is Williams' first title that is below a premier level. This also marks Williams being undefeated on clay in 2013 having a 28–0 record.

=== US Open Series ===
==== Rogers Cup ====
Williams' began her US Open campaign at the 2013 Rogers Cup in Toronto. Williams received a bye in the first round and faced Francesca Schiavone. Schiavone broke in the fifth game; however, Williams came back and won seven games in a row to take a set and double break lead. Schiavone then took two games just to see Williams take the next two and win the match. In the third round, Williams faced Venus' conqueror Kirsten Flipkens. Williams dominated the first set with a bagel. In the second set, Williams broke in the fourth game and it was enough to take the set and advance. In the quarterfinals, Williams defeated Slovak Magdaléna Rybáriková, dropping only a game on each set, which was a hold and a break respectively. In the final 4, Williams took on Agnieszka Radwańska. In the first set, the pair traded breaks twice to push it to a tiebreak, which Williams won. In the second set, Radwańska took an early break lead, however Williams then broke Radwańska twice to win the match. Williams then took on surprise finalist Sorana Cîrstea; Williams took the first three games, just to see Cîrstea take the next two, however Williams raced through winning the last nine games to win the title. This is Williams' eight title of the year matching her most titles in a year.

==== Western & Southern Open ====
After a successful campaign at the Roger's Cup in Toronto, Williams played in the 2013 Western & Southern Open in Cincinnati. Although she came in as the clear favorite, Williams had never won the tournament before. Along with the other top 8 seeds, she received a first round bye and went on to face Eugenie Bouchard of Canada in the second round. Bouchard broke in the first game, they then traded breaks in the fourth and fifth game. Bouchard then held with a break lead in the tenth game to take the set. Williams then broke in the fourth and eight game to push it to a decider. In the third set, Williams took the first four games, before Bouchard could take two straight games to see Williams win the next two to advance. Williams then took on German Mona Barthel. Williams broke in the second game, just to be broken serving for the set in the ninth game, however Williams broke to take the set. Williams then won the first five games before Barthel could win a game; Williams then closed it out to win. In the quarterfinals, Williams faced Simona Halep and took the first set with a bagel. The second set was closer; the pair traded breaks in the fourth and fifth game before Williams could break in the tenth game to win the match. Williams then went against China's Li Na and won in straight sets. The two sets had similar situations as Williams took a 4–2 lead in both; Li served for both in the tenth game just to get broken by Williams and then again in the twelfth game of each set to reach her first Cincinnati final. The final saw the top two seeds, Williams and Azarenka, take to the court for the title. After a dominant display by Williams and an error plagued game from Azarenka, Williams took the first set with a two break lead. A revitalised Azarenka began to take charge and the errors started creeping into Williams game, Azarenka then took the second set with a similar scoreline. Azarenka led by an early break in the final set, just to see Williams come back and serve for it in the tenth game only to get broken and lead to a tie-break, which Azarenka took 8 points to 6. This broke Williams' 14 match winning streak.

==== US Open ====
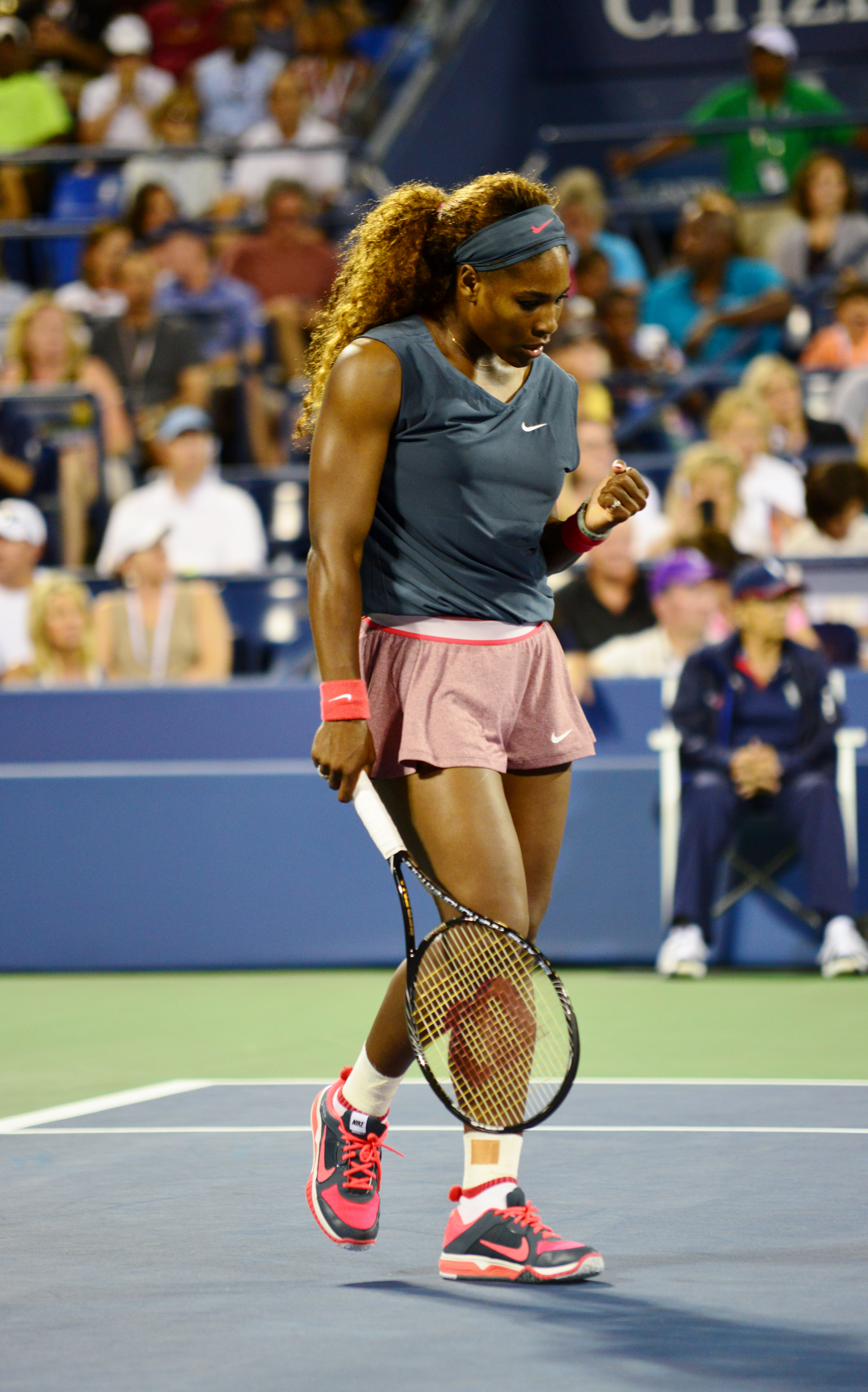
Serena Williams at the US Open.

After her disappointing loss to Azarenka in Cincinnati, Serena entered the 2013 US Open as the top seed, the defending champion, and bidding to become the oldest woman to win the U.S. Open since tennis turned professional in 1968. She beat former French Open champion Francesca Schiavone in the opening round, dropping only a game and hitting 13 winners to 8 unforced errors. In the second and third rounds, Williams easily dispatched Kazakhstan opponents, Galina Voskoboeva and Yaroslava Shvedova. In the Round of 16, Williams had a rematch of the Australian Open against Sloane Stephens, who surprisingly beat Williams in that event. In the first set, Williams broke first only to get broken back by Stephens in the 7th game. Williams then broke in the tenth game to take the set and cruised through the second set in a breadstick to avenge her loss at the Australian Open. Williams put up a ratio of 22 winners to 13 unforced errors. She then faced Carla Suárez Navarro, in the latter's birthday. Williams didn't drop a game, handing the Spaniard a double bagel loss; the first in a US Open since 1989, when 18-time major title winner Martina Navratilova did it to Manuela Maleeva. She again had a good ratio, with 20 winners to 9 unforced errors. In the final 4, Williams faced 5th seeded Li Na of China. Williams cruised past the Chinese with a bagel in the first round. Li then took an early break in the second, but Williams won four straight games. Li then served to stay in the match in the 7th game and saved 6 match points to make Williams serve it out, which Williams did in her 7th match point. For the first time in the event, Williams made more unforced errors of 20 to winners of 19. In the final, Williams took on second seed Victoria Azarenka in a rematch of last year's final. The pair exchanged breaks in the first two games. Williams then survived a long tenth game and broke the Belarusian the following game, then served out the set. In the second set, Williams served for the match twice in the tenth and twelfth game, but got broken by Azarenka to push it to a tie-break, which Azarenka outlasted Williams 8–6. Williams then cruised through the final set dropping only a game, winning the match on her 2nd championship point. Williams made 36 winners and 9 aces to 35 unforced errors and 5 double faults. This was Williams' 5th US Open and 17th Slam title. It was the first time Serena was able to defend a US Open title while also becoming the oldest women's US Open champion in the Open Era, surpassing the previous record set by Australia's Margaret Court. For winning the US Open Series, Williams received $2.6m and an additional million in prize money, the highest single paycheck in tennis.

In the doubles competition, Serena paired with sister Venus for the second time in the year. They opened their US Open against the Spanish pairing of Silvia Soler Espinosa and Carla Suárez Navarro. They lost the first set in a tie-break but they dominated the next two sets, dropping just three games, with a bagel in the second. They then competed against compatriots, Raquel Kops-Jones and Abigail Spears, and won both sets. Next, they played Anastasia Pavlyuchenkova and Lucie Šafářová, and quickly dominated the first set with a breadstick. In the second set, they served for the match in the tenth game but got broken and were pushed to a tie-break, which they won. In the quarterfinals, they took on world no. 1's Sara Errani and Roberta Vinci, and dominated them in straight sets. In the semifinals, the sisters faced the Czech pairing of Andrea Hlaváčková and Lucie Hradecká, and were surprisingly beaten in straight sets.

=== Asian Swing and Year-End Championships ===
==== China Open ====
Williams came into the China Open as the top seed and was assured to end the year at number 1. Williams began her quest for her 10th title against Elena Vesnina in the first round. The first set saw Vesnina breaking Williams twice; However, Williams broke the Russian three times to take the set. Williams then won the last five games to advance. In the second round, Williams took on Francesca Schiavone, in a rematch of the US Open first round where Williams only dropped a game. In the first set, it remained on serve until the tenth game when Williams broke Schiavone to take the set. In the second set, Schiavone served for it in the ninth game and had 2 set points but Williams broke and took the next three games to win the set and match. Williams then faced Maria Kirilenko in the round of 16 and defeated her Russian opponent in two very tight sets, with Williams winning both sets by breaking Kirilenko in the twelfth game. In the quarterfinals, Williams went against Caroline Wozniacki. Williams won 10 of the first 11 games in the process, taking the first set. However, Wozniacki came back winning three games in a row to keep it just a break down. Williams kept the break lead and won the second set. In the semifinals, she took on 3rd seed Agnieszka Radwańska and won in straight sets; breaking Radwańska twice on each set and facing only 1 break point in the last game and saving it. Williams then faced Jelena Janković in the final. In the first set, Williams broke Janković twice to take the set. In the second set, Janković broke in the third game, but took a medical timeout right after and lost the last five games to give Williams the title. This was Williams' 10th title of the year and her first China Open title since winning the first edition of the event in 2004.

==== WTA Championships ====
Williams came into the Year-End Championships being assured to end the year at no. 1 and in a 10 match winning streak having won it in 2012 and 2009, while missing the 2010 and 2011 editions. She was grouped alongside Agnieszka Radwańska, Petra Kvitová, and Angelique Kerber in the red group. Her first match was against German Kerber. Williams broke at the 3rd game of the first set and held serve in the entire set to take the first. Williams then won the second set with a breadstick. Williams made 31 winners and 11 unforced errors in the match. In her second match in her group, Williams faced Pole Radwańska. Williams broke Radwańska to wrap up both sets in the eight and tenth game respectively to go 2–0 in her group. In her final round robin match, she took on Czech Kvitová. Williams fend off break points in the opening game and then broke Kvitová in the second and eight game to take a set lead and assured her a spot in the semifinals. The second set was tighter, Williams broke Kvitová in the fourth game and that was enough to win the set. Williams hit 11 aces in the match. After finishing first in her group, Williams took on Jelena Janković in the semifinals. Janković took the initial lead breaking Williams in the fourth game, but Williams came back breaking the Serbian in the fifth and seventh game, and held in the tenth game to take the first set. In the second set, Janković broke the American three times, whilst getting broken once to take the set breaking Williams in the eight game, this is the first set Williams lost in 11 consecutive straight set wins at the event. In the deciding set, the first 3 games were breaks of serve, Williams then broke against in the fifth game. Williams served for it for the first time at the eight game but was broken, however, she closed it out serving it out in the tenth game in her 4th match point and saving a break point. Williams hit an even 40 winners and 40 unforced errors. In the final, Williams took on first time finalist and fourth seed Li Na. Li dominated the first set breaking Williams twice to take the set. Williams took a quick lead in the second set taking the first three games, however Li came back winning the next three. However Williams dominated winning the final nine games, to take the sets at three and love to claim her fourth Year End Championships title and 11th title in the year. She also extends her winning streak at 15 at the event.

=== Fed Cup ===
While she didn't play in the United States' first round match against Italy, Williams represented United States in the Fed Cup against Sweden for a spot in the 2014 World Group. In her opening rubber, she faced Johanna Larsson and dominated her opponent winning both set with a loss of only two games in each in just 66 minutes. In her second rubber, Williams took on Sofia Arvidsson and just needed 56 minutes to a straight set victory to give United States a 2–1 advantage, which her sister Venus closed out when she beat Larsson to help US advance to the World Group.

== All matches ==
=== Singles matches ===
Tournament	Match	Round	Opponent	Rank	Result	Score
Brisbane International; Brisbane, Australia; WTA Premier; Hard, outdoor 30 December 2012 – 5 January 2013	663	1R	(United States) Varvara Lepchenko	#21	Win	6–2, 6–1
Brisbane International; Brisbane, Australia; WTA Premier; Hard, outdoor 30 December 2012 – 5 January 2013	664	2R	(France) Alizé Cornet	#44	Win	6–2, 6–2
Brisbane International; Brisbane, Australia; WTA Premier; Hard, outdoor 30 December 2012 – 5 January 2013	665	QF	(United States) Sloane Stephens	#38	Win	6–4, 6–3
Brisbane International; Brisbane, Australia; WTA Premier; Hard, outdoor 30 December 2012 – 5 January 2013	–	SF	(Belarus) Victoria Azarenka	#1	Walkover	N/A
Brisbane International; Brisbane, Australia; WTA Premier; Hard, outdoor 30 December 2012 – 5 January 2013	666	F	(Russia) Anastasia Pavlyuchenkova	#36	Win (1)	6–2, 6–1
Australian Open; Melbourne, Australia; Grand Slam; Hard, outdoor 14–27 January 2013	667	1R	(Romania) Edina Gallovits-Hall	#110	Win	6–0, 6–0
Australian Open; Melbourne, Australia; Grand Slam; Hard, outdoor 14–27 January 2013	668	2R	(Spain) Garbiñe Muguruza	#112	Win	6–2, 6–0
Australian Open; Melbourne, Australia; Grand Slam; Hard, outdoor 14–27 January 2013	669	3R	(Japan) Ayumi Morita	#72	Win	6–1, 6–3
Australian Open; Melbourne, Australia; Grand Slam; Hard, outdoor 14–27 January 2013	670	4R	(Russia) Maria Kirilenko	#15	Win	6–2, 6–0
Australian Open; Melbourne, Australia; Grand Slam; Hard, outdoor 14–27 January 2013	671	QF	(United States) Sloane Stephens	#25	Loss	6–3, 5–7, 4–6
Qatar Total Open; Doha, Qatar; WTA Premier 5 Hard, outdoor 11–17 February 2013	–	1R	Bye			
Qatar Total Open; Doha, Qatar; WTA Premier 5 Hard, outdoor 11–17 February 2013	672	2R	(Russia) Daria Gavrilova	#160	Win	6–2, 6–1
Qatar Total Open; Doha, Qatar; WTA Premier 5 Hard, outdoor 11–17 February 2013	673	3R	(Poland) Urszula Radwańska	#37	Win	6–0, 6–3
Qatar Total Open; Doha, Qatar; WTA Premier 5 Hard, outdoor 11–17 February 2013	674	QF	(Czech Republic) Petra Kvitová	#8	Win	3–6, 6–3, 7–5
Qatar Total Open; Doha, Qatar; WTA Premier 5 Hard, outdoor 11–17 February 2013	675	SF	(Russia) Maria Sharapova	#3	Win	6–3, 6–2
Qatar Total Open; Doha, Qatar; WTA Premier 5 Hard, outdoor 11–17 February 2013	676	F	(Belarus) Victoria Azarenka	#1	Loss (1)	6–7^{(6–8)}, 6–2, 3–6
Dubai Tennis Championships; Dubai, United Arab Emirates; WTA Premier; Hard, outdoor 18–23 February 2013	–	1R	Bye			
Dubai Tennis Championships; Dubai, United Arab Emirates; WTA Premier; Hard, outdoor 18–23 February 2013	–	2R	(France) Marion Bartoli	#11	Withdrew	N/A
Sony Open Tennis; Miami, United States; WTA Premier Mandatory; Hard, outdoor 18–31 March 2013	–	1R	Bye			
Sony Open Tennis; Miami, United States; WTA Premier Mandatory; Hard, outdoor 18–31 March 2013	677	2R	(Italy) Flavia Pennetta	#103	Win	6–1, 6–1
Sony Open Tennis; Miami, United States; WTA Premier Mandatory; Hard, outdoor 18–31 March 2013	678	3R	(Japan) Ayumi Morita	#50	Win	6–3, 6–3
Sony Open Tennis; Miami, United States; WTA Premier Mandatory; Hard, outdoor 18–31 March 2013	679	4R	(Slovakia) Dominika Cibulková	#14	Win	2–6, 6–4, 6–2
Sony Open Tennis; Miami, United States; WTA Premier Mandatory; Hard, outdoor 18–31 March 2013	680	QF	(China) Li Na	#5	Win	6–3, 7–6^{(7–5)}
Sony Open Tennis; Miami, United States; WTA Premier Mandatory; Hard, outdoor 18–31 March 2013	681	SF	(Poland) Agnieszka Radwańska	#4	Win	6–0, 6–3
Sony Open Tennis; Miami, United States; WTA Premier Mandatory; Hard, outdoor 18–31 March 2013	682	F	(Russia) Maria Sharapova	#2	Win (2)	4–6, 6–3, 6–0
Family Circle Cup; Charleston, United States; WTA Premier; Clay (green), outdoor 1–7 April 2013	–	1R	Bye			
Family Circle Cup; Charleston, United States; WTA Premier; Clay (green), outdoor 1–7 April 2013	683	2R	(Italy) Camila Giorgi	#85	Win	6–2, 6–3
Family Circle Cup; Charleston, United States; WTA Premier; Clay (green), outdoor 1–7 April 2013	684	3R	(United States) Mallory Burdette	#99	Win	6–4, 6–2
Family Circle Cup; Charleston, United States; WTA Premier; Clay (green), outdoor 1–7 April 2013	685	QF	(Czech Republic) Lucie Šafářová	#19	Win	6–4, 6–1
Family Circle Cup; Charleston, United States; WTA Premier; Clay (green), outdoor 1–7 April 2013	686	SF	(United States) Venus Williams	#24	Win	6–1, 6–2
Family Circle Cup; Charleston, United States; WTA Premier; Clay (green), outdoor 1–7 April 2013	687	F	(Serbia) Jelena Janković	#18	Win (3)	3–6, 6–0, 6–2
Fed Cup play-offs: United States vs. Sweden; Delray Beach, United States; Fed Cup; Hard, outdoor 20–21 April 2013	688	–	(Sweden) Johanna Larsson	#66	Win	6–2, 6–2
Fed Cup play-offs: United States vs. Sweden; Delray Beach, United States; Fed Cup; Hard, outdoor 20–21 April 2013	689	–	(Sweden) Sofia Arvidsson	#54	Win	6–2, 6–1
Mutua Madrid Open; Madrid, Spain; WTA Premier Mandatory; Clay, outdoor 6–12 May 2013	690	1R	(Kazakhstan) Yulia Putintseva	#88	Win	7–6^{(7–5)}, 6–1
Mutua Madrid Open; Madrid, Spain; WTA Premier Mandatory; Clay, outdoor 6–12 May 2013	691	2R	(Spain) Lourdes Domínguez Lino	#47	Win	6–2, 7–5
Mutua Madrid Open; Madrid, Spain; WTA Premier Mandatory; Clay, outdoor 6–12 May 2013	692	3R	(Russia) Maria Kirilenko	#12	Win	6–3, 6–1
Mutua Madrid Open; Madrid, Spain; WTA Premier Mandatory; Clay, outdoor 6–12 May 2013	693	QF	(Spain) Anabel Medina Garrigues	#63	Win	6–3, 0–6, 7–5
Mutua Madrid Open; Madrid, Spain; WTA Premier Mandatory; Clay, outdoor 6–12 May 2013	694	SF	(Italy) Sara Errani	#7	Win	7–5, 6–2
Mutua Madrid Open; Madrid, Spain; WTA Premier Mandatory; Clay, outdoor 6–12 May 2013	695	F	(Russia) Maria Sharapova	#2	Win (4)	6–1, 6–4
Internazionali BNL d'Italia; Rome, Italy; WTA Premier 5 Clay, outdoor 13–19 May 2013	–	1R	Bye			
Internazionali BNL d'Italia; Rome, Italy; WTA Premier 5 Clay, outdoor 13–19 May 2013	696	2R	(United Kingdom) Laura Robson	#39	Win	6–2, 6–2
Internazionali BNL d'Italia; Rome, Italy; WTA Premier 5 Clay, outdoor 13–19 May 2013	697	3R	(Slovakia) Dominika Cibulková	#16	Win	6–0, 6–1
Internazionali BNL d'Italia; Rome, Italy; WTA Premier 5 Clay, outdoor 13–19 May 2013	698	QF	(Spain) Carla Suárez Navarro	#22	Win	6–2, 6–0
Internazionali BNL d'Italia; Rome, Italy; WTA Premier 5 Clay, outdoor 13–19 May 2013	699	SF	(Romania) Simona Halep	#64	Win	6–3, 6–0
Internazionali BNL d'Italia; Rome, Italy; WTA Premier 5 Clay, outdoor 13–19 May 2013	700	F	(Belarus) Victoria Azarenka	#3	Win (5)	6–1, 6–3
French Open; Paris, France; Grand Slam; Clay, outdoor 26 May – 9 June 2013	701	1R	(Georgia (country)) Anna Tatishvili	#83	Win	6–0, 6–1
French Open; Paris, France; Grand Slam; Clay, outdoor 26 May – 9 June 2013	702	2R	(France) Caroline Garcia	#113	Win	6–1, 6–2
French Open; Paris, France; Grand Slam; Clay, outdoor 26 May – 9 June 2013	703	3R	(Romania) Sorana Cîrstea	#26	Win	6–0, 6–2
French Open; Paris, France; Grand Slam; Clay, outdoor 26 May – 9 June 2013	704	4R	(Italy) Roberta Vinci	#15	Win	6–1, 6–3
French Open; Paris, France; Grand Slam; Clay, outdoor 26 May – 9 June 2013	705	QF	(Russia) Svetlana Kuznetsova	#39	Win	6–1, 3–6, 6–3
French Open; Paris, France; Grand Slam; Clay, outdoor 26 May – 9 June 2013	706	SF	(Italy) Sara Errani	#5	Win	6–0, 6–1
French Open; Paris, France; Grand Slam; Clay, outdoor 26 May – 9 June 2013	707	F	(Russia) Maria Sharapova	#2	Win (6)	6–4, 6–4
Wimbledon Championships; London, United Kingdom; Grand Slam; Grass, outdoor 24 June – 7 July 2013	708	1R	(Luxembourg) Mandy Minella	#92	Win	6–1, 6–3
Wimbledon Championships; London, United Kingdom; Grand Slam; Grass, outdoor 24 June – 7 July 2013	709	2R	(France) Caroline Garcia	#100	Win	6–3, 6–2
Wimbledon Championships; London, United Kingdom; Grand Slam; Grass, outdoor 24 June – 7 July 2013	710	3R	(Japan) Kimiko Date-Krumm	#84	Win	6–2, 6–0
Wimbledon Championships; London, United Kingdom; Grand Slam; Grass, outdoor 24 June – 7 July 2013	711	4R	(Germany) Sabine Lisicki	#23	Loss	2–6, 6–1, 4–6
Collector Swedish Open; Båstad, Sweden; WTA International; Clay, outdoor 15–21 July 2013	712	1R	(Kazakhstan) Sesil Karatantcheva	#131	Win	6–1, 6–2
Collector Swedish Open; Båstad, Sweden; WTA International; Clay, outdoor 15–21 July 2013	713	2R	(Georgia (country)) Anna Tatishvili	#104	Win	6–2, 6–3
Collector Swedish Open; Båstad, Sweden; WTA International; Clay, outdoor 15–21 July 2013	714	QF	(Spain) Lourdes Domínguez Lino	#54	Win	6–1, 6–1
Collector Swedish Open; Båstad, Sweden; WTA International; Clay, outdoor 15–21 July 2013	715	SF	(Czech Republic) Klára Zakopalová	#37	Win	6–0, 6–4
Collector Swedish Open; Båstad, Sweden; WTA International; Clay, outdoor 15–21 July 2013	716	F	(Sweden) Johanna Larsson	#76	Win (7)	6–4, 6–1
Rogers Cup; Toronto, Canada; WTA Premier 5 Hard, outdoor 5–11 August 2013	–	1R	Bye			
Rogers Cup; Toronto, Canada; WTA Premier 5 Hard, outdoor 5–11 August 2013	717	2R	(Italy) Francesca Schiavone	#57	Win	6–3, 6–2
Rogers Cup; Toronto, Canada; WTA Premier 5 Hard, outdoor 5–11 August 2013	718	3R	(Belgium) Kirsten Flipkens	#13	Win	6–0, 6–3
Rogers Cup; Toronto, Canada; WTA Premier 5 Hard, outdoor 5–11 August 2013	719	QF	(Slovakia) Magdaléna Rybáriková	#42	Win	6–1, 6–1
Rogers Cup; Toronto, Canada; WTA Premier 5 Hard, outdoor 5–11 August 2013	720	SF	(Poland) Agnieszka Radwańska	#4	Win	7–6^{(7–3)}, 6–4
Rogers Cup; Toronto, Canada; WTA Premier 5 Hard, outdoor 5–11 August 2013	721	F	(Romania) Sorana Cîrstea	#27	Win (8)	6–2, 6–0
Western & Southern Open; Cincinnati, United States; WTA Premier 5 Hard, outdoor 12–18 August 2013	–	1R	Bye			
Western & Southern Open; Cincinnati, United States; WTA Premier 5 Hard, outdoor 12–18 August 2013	722	2R	(Canada) Eugenie Bouchard	#62	Win	4–6, 6–2, 6–2
Western & Southern Open; Cincinnati, United States; WTA Premier 5 Hard, outdoor 12–18 August 2013	723	3R	(Germany) Mona Barthel	#32	Win	6–4, 6–1
Western & Southern Open; Cincinnati, United States; WTA Premier 5 Hard, outdoor 12–18 August 2013	724	QF	(Romania) Simona Halep	#25	Win	6–0, 6–4
Western & Southern Open; Cincinnati, United States; WTA Premier 5 Hard, outdoor 12–18 August 2013	725	SF	(China) Li Na	#5	Win	7–5, 7–5
Western & Southern Open; Cincinnati, United States; WTA Premier 5 Hard, outdoor 12–18 August 2013	726	F	(Belarus) Victoria Azarenka	#2	Loss (2)	6–2, 2–6, 6–7^{(6–8)}
US Open; New York City, United States; Grand Slam; Hard, outdoor 26 August – 9 September 2013	727	1R	(Italy) Francesca Schiavone	#56	Win	6–0, 6–1
US Open; New York City, United States; Grand Slam; Hard, outdoor 26 August – 9 September 2013	728	2R	(Kazakhstan) Galina Voskoboeva	#77	Win	6–3, 6–0
US Open; New York City, United States; Grand Slam; Hard, outdoor 26 August – 9 September 2013	729	3R	(Kazakhstan) Yaroslava Shvedova	#78	Win	6–3, 6–1
US Open; New York City, United States; Grand Slam; Hard, outdoor 26 August – 9 September 2013	730	4R	(United States) Sloane Stephens	#16	Win	6–4, 6–1
US Open; New York City, United States; Grand Slam; Hard, outdoor 26 August – 9 September 2013	731	QF	(Spain) Carla Suárez Navarro	#20	Win	6–0, 6–0
US Open; New York City, United States; Grand Slam; Hard, outdoor 26 August – 9 September 2013	732	SF	(China) Li Na	#6	Win	6–0, 6–3
US Open; New York City, United States; Grand Slam; Hard, outdoor 26 August – 9 September 2013	733	F	(Belarus) Victoria Azarenka	#2	Win (9)	7–5, 6–7^{(6–8)}, 6–1
China Open; Beijing, China; WTA Premier Mandatory; Hard, outdoor 28 September – 6 October 2013	734	1R	(Russia) Elena Vesnina	#24	Win	6–4, 6–2
China Open; Beijing, China; WTA Premier Mandatory; Hard, outdoor 28 September – 6 October 2013	735	2R	(Italy) Francesca Schiavone	#47	Win	6–4, 7–5
China Open; Beijing, China; WTA Premier Mandatory; Hard, outdoor 28 September – 6 October 2013	736	3R	(Russia) Maria Kirilenko	#18	Win	7–5, 7–5
China Open; Beijing, China; WTA Premier Mandatory; Hard, outdoor 28 September – 6 October 2013	737	QF	(Denmark) Caroline Wozniacki	#8	Win	6–1, 6–4
China Open; Beijing, China; WTA Premier Mandatory; Hard, outdoor 28 September – 6 October 2013	738	SF	(Poland) Agnieszka Radwańska	#4	Win	6–2, 6–2
China Open; Beijing, China; WTA Premier Mandatory; Hard, outdoor 28 September – 6 October 2013	739	F	(Serbia) Jelena Janković	#11	Win (10)	6–2, 6–2
WTA Tour Championships; Istanbul, Turkey; Year-End Championship; Hard, indoor 21 – 27 October 2013	740	RR	(Germany) Angelique Kerber	#9	Win	6–3, 6–1
WTA Tour Championships; Istanbul, Turkey; Year-End Championship; Hard, indoor 21 – 27 October 2013	741	RR	(Poland) Agnieszka Radwańska	#4	Win	6–2, 6–4
WTA Tour Championships; Istanbul, Turkey; Year-End Championship; Hard, indoor 21 – 27 October 2013	742	RR	(Czech Republic) Petra Kvitová	#6	Win	6–2, 6–3
WTA Tour Championships; Istanbul, Turkey; Year-End Championship; Hard, indoor 21 – 27 October 2013	743	SF	(Serbia) Jelena Janković	#8	Win	6–4, 2–6, 6–4
WTA Tour Championships; Istanbul, Turkey; Year-End Championship; Hard, indoor 21 – 27 October 2013	744	F	(China) Li Na	#5	Win (11)	2–6, 6–3, 6–0

=== Doubles matches ===
Tournament	Match	Round	Partner	Opponents	Rank	Result	Score
Australian Open; Melbourne, Australia; Grand Slam; Hard, outdoor 14–27 January 2013	188	1R	(United States) Venus Williams	(Italy) Camila Giorgi (Switzerland) Stefanie Vögele	#NR #150	Win	6–3, 6–1
Australian Open; Melbourne, Australia; Grand Slam; Hard, outdoor 14–27 January 2013	189	2R	(United States) Venus Williams	(Russia) Vera Dushevina (Belarus) Olga Govortsova	#43 #61	Win	6–1, 6–2
Australian Open; Melbourne, Australia; Grand Slam; Hard, outdoor 14–27 January 2013	190	3R	(United States) Venus Williams	(Russia) Nadia Petrova (Slovenia) Katarina Srebotnik	#5 #16	Win	6–2, 6–3
Australian Open; Melbourne, Australia; Grand Slam; Hard, outdoor 14–27 January 2013	191	QF	(United States) Venus Williams	(Italy) Sara Errani (Italy) Roberta Vinci	#2 #1	Loss	6–3, 6–7^{(1–7)}, 5–7
US Open; New York City, United States; Grand Slam; Hard, outdoor 26 August – 9 September 2013	192	1R	(United States) Venus Williams	(Spain) Silvia Soler Espinosa (Spain) Carla Suárez Navarro	#46 #56	Win	6–7^{(5–7)}, 6–0, 6–3
US Open; New York City, United States; Grand Slam; Hard, outdoor 26 August – 9 September 2013	193	2R	(United States) Venus Williams	(United States) Raquel Kops-Jones (United States) Abigail Spears	#13 #13	Win	6–4, 6–4
US Open; New York City, United States; Grand Slam; Hard, outdoor 26 August – 9 September 2013	194	3R	(United States) Venus Williams	(Russia) Anastasia Pavlyuchenkova (Czech Republic) Lucie Šafářová	#29 #19	Win	6–1, 7–6^{(7–3)}
US Open; New York City, United States; Grand Slam; Hard, outdoor 26 August – 9 September 2013	195	QF	(United States) Venus Williams	(Italy) Sara Errani (Italy) Roberta Vinci	#1 #1	Win	6–3, 6–1
US Open; New York City, United States; Grand Slam; Hard, outdoor 26 August – 9 September 2013	196	SF	(United States) Venus Williams	(Czech Republic) Andrea Hlaváčková (Czech Republic) Lucie Hradecká	#8 #11	Loss	4–6, 2–6
China Open; Beijing, China; WTA Premier Mandatory; Hard, outdoor 28 September – 6 October 2013	197	1R	(United States) Venus Williams	(Chinese Taipei) Chan Hao-ching (United States) Liezel Huber	#28 #19	Loss	7–6^{(7–3)}, 4–6, [9–11]

== Tournament schedule ==
=== Singles schedule ===
Williams' 2013 singles tournament schedule is as follows:

Date	Championship	Location	Category	Surface	Points	Outcome
30 December 2012 – 5 January 2013	Brisbane International	Brisbane	WTA Premier	Hard	470	Winner defeated (Russia) A Pavlyuchenkova, 6–2, 6–1
14 January – 27 January	Australian Open	Melbourne	Grand Slam	Hard	500	Quarterfinals lost to (United States) S Stephens, 6–3, 5–7, 4–6
11 February – 17 February	Qatar Total Open	Doha	WTA Premier 5	Hard	620	Final lost to (Belarus) V Azarenka, 6–7^{(6–8)}, 6–2, 3–6
18 February – 23 February	Dubai Tennis Championships	Dubai	WTA Premier	Hard	0	Second Round; Withdrew before match against (France) M Bartoli
18 March – 31 March	Sony Open Tennis	Miami	WTA Premier Mandatory	Hard	1000	Winner defeated (Russia) M Sharapova, 4–6, 6–3, 6–0
1 April – 7 April	Family Circle Cup	Charleston	WTA Premier	Clay (green)	470	Winner defeated (Serbia) J Janković, 3–6, 6–0, 6–2
20 April – 21 April	Fed Cup WG Play-offs: USA vs. Sweden	Delray Beach	Fed Cup	Hard		United States def. Argentina, 4–1; USA advanced to 2014 Fed Cup WG
6 May – 12 May	Mutua Madrid Open	Madrid	WTA Premier Mandatory	Clay (red)	1000	Winner defeated (Russia) M Sharapova, 6–1, 6–4
11 May – 17 May	Internazionali BNL d'Italia	Rome	WTA Premier 5	Clay (red)	900	Winner defeated (Belarus) V Azarenka, 6–1, 6–3
25 May – 8 June	French Open	Paris	Grand Slam	Clay (red)	2000	Winner defeated (Russia) M Sharapova, 6–4, 6–4
24 June – 7 July	Wimbledon	London	Grand Slam	Grass	280	Fourth Round lost to (Germany) S Lisicki, 2–6, 6–1, 4–6
15 July – 21 July	Swedish Open	Båstad	WTA International	Clay (red)	280	Winner defeated (Sweden) J Larsson, 6–4, 6–1
5 August – 11 August	Rogers Cup	Canada	WTA Premier 5	Hard	900	Winner defeated (Romania) S Cîrstea, 6–2, 6–0
12 August – 18 August	Western & Southern Open	Cincinnati	WTA Premier 5	Hard	620	Final lost to (Belarus) V Azarenka, 6–2, 2–6, 6–7^{(6–8)}
26 August – 9 September	US Open	New York	Grand Slam	Hard	2000	Winner defeated (Belarus) V Azarenka, 7–5, 6–7^{(6–8)}, 6–1
30 September – 6 October	China Open	Beijing	WTA Premier Mandatory	Hard	1000	Winner defeated (Serbia) J Janković, 6–2, 6–2
21 October – 27 October	WTA Tour Championships	Istanbul	Year-End Championships	Hard (i)	1500	Winner defeated (China) N Li, 2–6, 6–3, 6–0
Total year-end points					13540	

=== Doubles schedule ===
Williams' 2013 doubles tournament schedule is as follows:

Date	Championship	Location	Category	Surface	Points	Outcome
14 January – 27 January	Australian Open	Melbourne	Grand Slam	Hard	500	Quarterfinals lost to (Italy) S Errani/ (Italy) R Vinci; 6–3, 6–7^{(1–7)}, 5–7
26 August – 9 September	US Open	New York	Grand Slam	Hard	900	Semifinals lost to (Czech Republic) A Hlaváčková/ (Czech Republic) L Hradecká; 4–6, 2–6
30 September – 6 October	China Open	Beijing	WTA Premier Mandatory	Hard	5	First Round lost to (Chinese Taipei) Chan/ (United States) Huber; 7–6^{(7–3)}, 4–6, [9–11]
Total year-end points					1405	Partner: (United States) Venus Williams

== Yearly records ==
=== Head-to-head matchups ===
Ordered by percentage of wins, as of WTA Tour Championships

- (China) Li Na 4–0
- (Poland) Agnieszka Radwańska 4–0
- (Russia) Maria Sharapova 4–0
- (Serbia) Jelena Janković 3–0
- (Russia) Maria Kirilenko 3–0
- (Italy) Francesca Schiavone 3–0
- (Slovakia) Dominika Cibulková 2–0
- (Romania) Sorana Cîrstea 2–0
- (Spain) Lourdes Domínguez Lino 2–0
- (Italy) Sara Errani 2–0
- (France) Caroline Garcia 2–0
- (Romania) Simona Halep 2–0
- (Czech Republic) Petra Kvitová 2–0
- (Sweden) Johanna Larsson 2–0
- (Japan) Ayumi Morita 2–0
- (Spain) Carla Suárez Navarro 2–0
- (Georgia (country)) Anna Tatishvili 2–0
- (Sweden) Sofia Arvidsson 1–0
- (Germany) Mona Barthel 1–0
- (Canada) Eugenie Bouchard 1–0
- (United States) Mallory Burdette 1–0
- (France) Alizé Cornet 1–0
- (Japan) Kimiko Date-Krumm 1–0
- (Belgium) Kirsten Flipkens 1–0
- (Romania) Edina Gallovits-Hall 1–0
- (Russia) Daria Gavrilova 1–0
- (Italy) Camila Giorgi 1–0
- (Kazakhstan) Sesil Karatantcheva 1–0
- (Germany) Angelique Kerber 1–0
- (Russia) Svetlana Kuznetsova 1–0
- (United States) Varvara Lepchenko 1–0
- (Spain) Anabel Medina Garrigues 1–0
- (Luxembourg) Mandy Minella 1–0
- (Spain) Garbiñe Muguruza 1–0
- (Russia) Anastasia Pavlyuchenkova 1–0
- (Italy) Flavia Pennetta 1–0
- (Kazakhstan) Yulia Putintseva 1–0
- (Poland) Urszula Radwańska 1–0
- (United Kingdom) Laura Robson 1–0
- (Slovakia) Magdaléna Rybáriková 1–0
- (Czech Republic) Lucie Šafářová 1–0
- (Kazakhstan) Yaroslava Shvedova 1–0
- (Russia) Elena Vesnina 1–0
- (Italy) Roberta Vinci 1–0
- (Kazakhstan) Galina Voskoboeva 1–0
- (United States) Venus Williams 1–0
- (Denmark) Caroline Wozniacki 1–0
- (Czech Republic) Klára Zakopalová 1–0
- (United States) Sloane Stephens 2–1
- (Belarus) Victoria Azarenka 2–2
- (Germany) Sabine Lisicki 0–1

=== Finals ===
==== Singles: 13 (11–2) ====
Legend Grand Slams (2–0) WTA Tour Championships (1–0) WTA Premier Mandatory (3–0) WTA Premier 5 (2–2) WTA Premier (2–0) WTA International (1–0)	Finals by surface Hard (6–2) Clay (5–0)	Finals by venue Outdoors (10–2) Indoors (1–0)

Outcome	No.	Date	Championship	Surface	Opponent in the final	Score in the final
Winner	47.	January 5, 2013	Brisbane, Australia	Hard	(Russia) Anastasia Pavlyuchenkova	6–2, 6–1
Runner-up	16.	February 17, 2013	Doha, Qatar	Hard	(Belarus) Victoria Azarenka	6–7^{(6–8)}, 6–2, 3–6
Winner	48.	March 30, 2013	Miami, USA (6)	Hard	(Russia) Maria Sharapova	4–6, 6–3, 6–0
Winner	49.	April 7, 2013	Charleston, USA (3)	Clay (green)	(Serbia) Jelena Janković	3–6, 6–0, 6–2
Winner	50.	May 12, 2013	Madrid, Spain (2)	Clay (red)	(Russia) Maria Sharapova	6–1, 6–4
Winner	51.	May 19, 2013	Rome, Italy (2)	Clay (red)	(Belarus) Victoria Azarenka	6–1, 6–3
Winner	52.	June 8, 2013	French Open, Paris, France (2)	Clay (red)	(Russia) Maria Sharapova	6–4, 6–4
Winner	53.	July 21, 2013	Båstad, Sweden	Clay (red)	(Sweden) Johanna Larsson	6–4, 6–1
Winner	54.	August 11, 2013	Toronto, Canada (3)	Hard	(Romania) Sorana Cîrstea	6–2, 6–0
Runner-up	17.	18 August 2013	Cincinnati, USA	Hard	(Belarus) Victoria Azarenka	6–2, 2–6, 6–7^{(6–8)}
Winner	55.	8 September 2013	US Open, New York City, US (5)	Hard	(Belarus) Victoria Azarenka	7–5, 6–7^{(6–8)}, 6–1
Winner	56.	6 October 2013	China Open, Beijing, China (2)	Hard	(Serbia) Jelena Janković	6–2, 6–2
Winner	57.	27 October 2013	WTA Tour Championships, Istanbul, Turkey (4)	Hard (i)	(China) Li Na	2–6, 6–3, 6–0

=== Earnings ===
#	Event	Prize money	Year-to-date
1	Brisbane International	$162,987	$162,987
2	Australian Open (singles)	A$250,000	$414,216
2	Australian Open (doubles)	A$30,000	$444,363
3	Qatar Total Open	$213,000	$657,363
4	Sony Open Tennis	$724,000	$1,381,363
5	Family Circle Cup	$125,000	$1,506,363
6	Mutua Madrid Open	€643,000	$2,325,481
7	Internazionali BNL d'Italia	€343,548	$2,751,481
8	French Open	€1,500,000	$4,621,750
9	Wimbledon	£105,000	$4,786,086
10	Swedish Open	$40,000	$4,826,086
11	Rogers Cup	$426,000	$5,252,086
12	Western & Southern Open	$213,000	$5,465,086
13	US Open (singles)	$2,555,715	$8,020,801
13	US Open Series bonus pool	$1,000,000	$9,020,801
13	US Open (doubles)	$56,521	$9,077,322
14	China Open (singles)	$860,000	$9,937,322
14	China Open (doubles)	$3,250	$9,940,572
15	WTA Tour Championships	$2,145,000	$12,085,572
Bonus Pool		$300,000	$12,385,572
			$12,385,572

Figures in United States dollars (USD) unless noted.

== See also ==
- Serena Williams career statistics

Sporting positions
Preceded by Venus Williams; Angelique Kerber	World No. 1 First stint: July 8, 2002 – August 10, 2003; Last stint: April 24, 2017 – May 14, 2017	Succeeded by Kim Clijsters; Angelique Kerber
Preceded by Jennifer Capriati; Justine Henin; Petra Kvitová	Year-end World No. 1; 2002; 2008, 2009; 2012 – 2015	Succeeded by Justine Henin; Kim Clijsters; Angelique Kerber
Awards
Preceded by Jennifer Capriati; Jelena Janković; Petra Kvitová	ITF Women's Singles World Champion; 2002; 2009; 2012 – 2015	Succeeded by Justine Henin; Caroline Wozniacki; Angelique Kerber
Preceded by Martina Hingis & Anna Kournikova; Cara Black & Liezel Huber	WTA Doubles Team of the Year; 2000 (with Venus Williams); 2009 (with Venus Williams)	Succeeded by Lisa Raymond & Rennae Stubbs; Gisela Dulko & Flavia Pennetta
Preceded by Cara Black & Liezel Huber	ITF Women's Doubles World Champion; 2009 (with Venus Williams)	Succeeded by Gisela Dulko & Flavia Pennetta
