= 2013 Qatar Total Open =

Women's tennis tournament

- Date: 11–17 February
- Edition: 11th
- Category: WTA Premier 5
- Draw: 56S / 26D
- Prize money: $2,369,000
- Surface: Hard
- Location: Doha, Qatar
- Venue: Khalifa International Tennis and Squash Complex

Champions

Singles
- (Belarus) Victoria Azarenka

Doubles
- (Italy) Sara Errani / (Italy) Roberta Vinci
← 2012 ·	Qatar Total Open	· 2014 →

The 2013 Qatar Total Open was a professional women's tennis tournament played on hard courts. It was the 11th edition of the event and part of the WTA Premier 5 series of the 2013 WTA Tour. It took place at the International Tennis and Squash complex in Doha, Qatar between 11 and 17 February 2013.

== Points and prize money ==
=== Point distribution ===
Event	W	F	SF	QF	Round of 16	Round of 32	Round of 64	Q	Q2	Q1
Singles	900	620	395	225	125	70	1	30	20	1
Doubles	900	620	395	225	125	1	—	—	—	—

=== Prize money ===
Event	W	F	SF	QF	Round of 16	Round of 32	Round of 64	Q2	Q1
Singles	$426,000	$213,000	$106,435	$49,040	$24,300	$12,480	$6,415	$3,560	$1,840
Doubles *	$122,000	$61,600	$30,490	$15,340	$7,780	3,840	—	—	—

_{* per team}

== Singles main-draw entrants ==
=== Seeds ===
Country	Player	Rank^{1}	Seed
BLR	Victoria Azarenka	1	1
USA	Serena Williams	2	2
RUS	Maria Sharapova	3	3
POL	Agnieszka Radwańska	4	4
GER	Angelique Kerber	6	5
ITA	Sara Errani	7	6
CZE	Petra Kvitová	8	7
AUS	Samantha Stosur	9	8
FRA	Marion Bartoli	10	9
DEN	Caroline Wozniacki	11	10
RUS	Nadia Petrova	12	11
RUS	Maria Kirilenko	13	12
SRB	Ana Ivanovic	14	13
~~SVK~~	~~Dominika Cibulková~~	~~15~~	~~14~~
ITA	Roberta Vinci	16	15
USA	Sloane Stephens	17	16
CZE	Lucie Šafářová	18	17

- ^{1} Rankings as of February 4, 2013.

=== Other entrants ===
The following players received wildcards into the singles main draw:

- (Oman) Fatma Al-Nabhani
- (Canada) Heidi El Tabakh
- (Tunisia) Ons Jabeur

The following players received entry from the qualifying draw:

- (Russia) Ekaterina Bychkova
- (Russia) Vera Dushevina
- (France) Caroline Garcia
- (Ukraine) Nadiia Kichenok
- (Slovenia) Tadeja Majerič
- (United States) Bethanie Mattek-Sands
- (Kazakhstan) Yulia Putintseva
- (Australia) Anastasia Rodionova

The following player received entry as lucky loser:

- (Russia) Daria Gavrilova
- (Bosnia and Herzegovina) Mervana Jugić-Salkić

=== Withdrawals ===
Before the tournament

- (China) Li Na (left ankle injury)
- (Slovakia) Dominika Cibulková
- (Serbia) Bojana Jovanovski (back injury)

=== Retirements ===
- (Russia) Maria Kirilenko (shoulder injury)
- (United States) Varvara Lepchenko (upper respiratory illness)
- (Russia) Ekaterina Makarova (left hill injury)
- (Belgium) Yanina Wickmayer (low back injury)

== Doubles main-draw entrants ==
=== Seeds ===
Country	Player	Country	Player	Rank^{1}	Seed
ITA	Sara Errani	ITA	Roberta Vinci	1	1
RUS	Nadia Petrova	SLO	Katarina Srebotnik	20	2
USA	Raquel Kops-Jones	USA	Abigail Spears	27	3
ESP	Nuria Llagostera Vives	CHN	Zheng Jie	30	4
TPE	Hsieh Su-wei	USA	Liezel Huber	33	5
GER	Anna-Lena Grönefeld	CZE	Květa Peschke	35	6
CZE	Andrea Hlaváčková	CZE	Lucie Šafářová	40	7
USA	Bethanie Mattek-Sands	IND	Sania Mirza	46	8

- ^{1} Rankings as of February 4, 2013.

=== Other entrants ===
The following pairs received wildcards into the doubles main draw:

- (Oman) Fatma Al-Nabhani / (Germany) Kathrin Wörle
- (France) Caroline Garcia / (United States) Christina McHale
- (Czech Republic) Petra Kvitová / (Belgium) Yanina Wickmayer
- (Bulgaria) Aleksandrina Naydenova / (Italy) Francesca Schiavone

The following pairs received entry as alternates:

- (Italy) Maria Elena Camerin / (Romania) Simona Halep
- (Poland) Justyna Jegiołka / (Ukraine) Veronika Kapshay
- (Ukraine) Lyudmyla Kichenok / (Ukraine) Nadiia Kichenok

=== Withdrawals ===
Before the tournament

- (United States) Varvara Lepchenko (upper respiratory illness)
- (Russia) Ekaterina Makarova (left hill injury)
- (Belgium) Yanina Wickmayer (low back injury)

== Champions ==
=== Singles ===
- (Belarus) Victoria Azarenka def. (United States) Serena Williams, 7–6^{(8–6)}, 2–6, 6–3

=== Doubles ===
- (Italy) Sara Errani / (Italy) Roberta Vinci def. (Russia) Nadia Petrova / (Slovenia) Katarina Srebotnik, 2–6, 6–3, [10–6]
