= Billie Jean (disambiguation) =

"Billie Jean" is a 1983 single released by Michael Jackson under his album Thriller.

Billie Jean may also refer to:

== Sports ==
- Billie Jean King (born 1943), American tennis player
- Billie Jean King Cup, Premier international team competition in women's tennis
- BNP Paribas Showdown, formerly known as the Billie Jean King Cup, annual one-night exhibition tennis event

== Other uses ==
- The Legend of Billie Jean, 1985 drama film
