= 2009 Billie Jean King Cup =

Billie Jean King Cup

Tournament information
- Location: Manhattan, New York; United States
- Venue: Madison Square Garden
- Category: Exhibition
- Surface: Hardcourt / Indoor
- Draw: 4S
- Prize money: US$ 1,200,000
- Website: thegarden.com

The 2009 Billie Jean King Cup was an exhibition women's tennis tournament played on March 2, 2009, in New York City, United States. It marked the inaugural year of the tournament, and the first time women's tennis had been played at Madison Square Garden since 2000, when the year-ending Chase Championships were held there. Broadcast internationally on HBO, the event featured 2008 US Open Champion Serena Williams, 2008 Wimbledon Champion Venus Williams, 2008 French Open Champion Ana Ivanovic and 2008 year end world No. 1 ranked player Jelena Janković, who filled in as a wild card for the injured 2008 Australian Open Champion Maria Sharapova.

Serena Williams won her semifinal match against Ana Ivanovic 6–3, and Venus Williams won hers 6–4 against Jelena Janković. The final was won by Serena 6–4, 6–3.

Between the semifinals and final a tribute was paid to tennis legend and pioneer Billie Jean King. The tribute featured a speech by former president Bill Clinton, and appearances by figure skaters Sarah Hughes and Nancy Kerrigan, race car driver Janet Guthrie, Billie Jean King's long time double's partner Rosie Casals and other prominent women in sports.

A portion of the proceeds from the 2009 event benefited the Dream Vaccines Foundation and the Women's Sports Foundation.

== Players ==
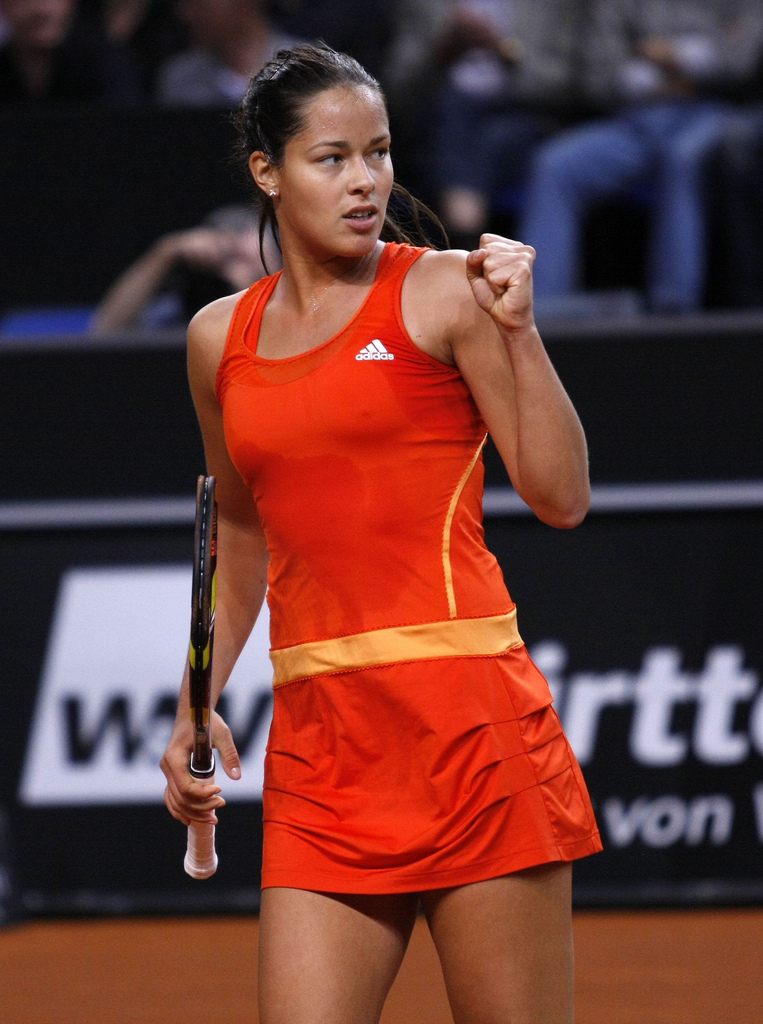
Ana Ivanovic - 2008 Roland Garros Grand Slam singles champion

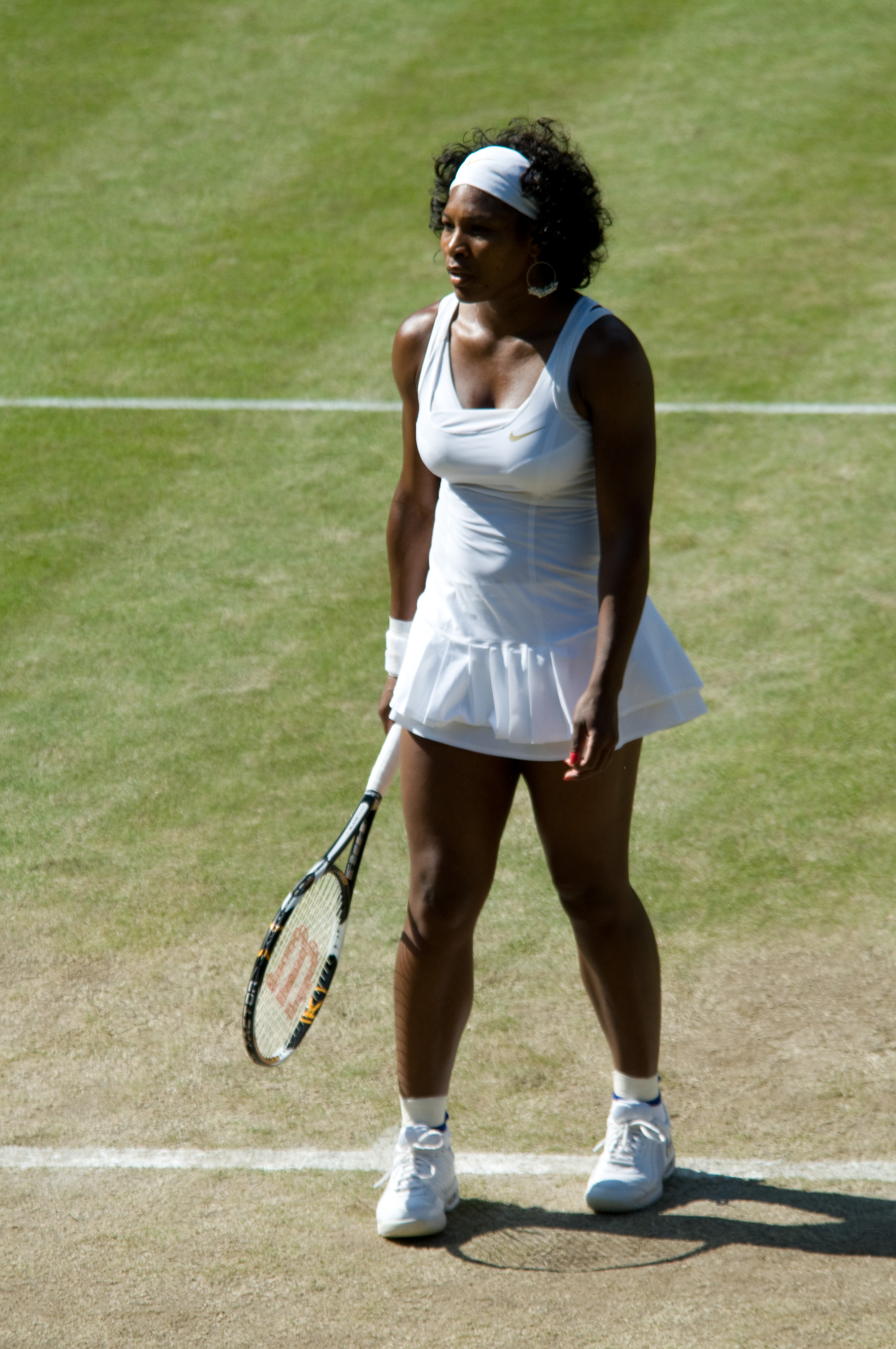
Serena Williams - 2008 US Open Grand Slam singles champion

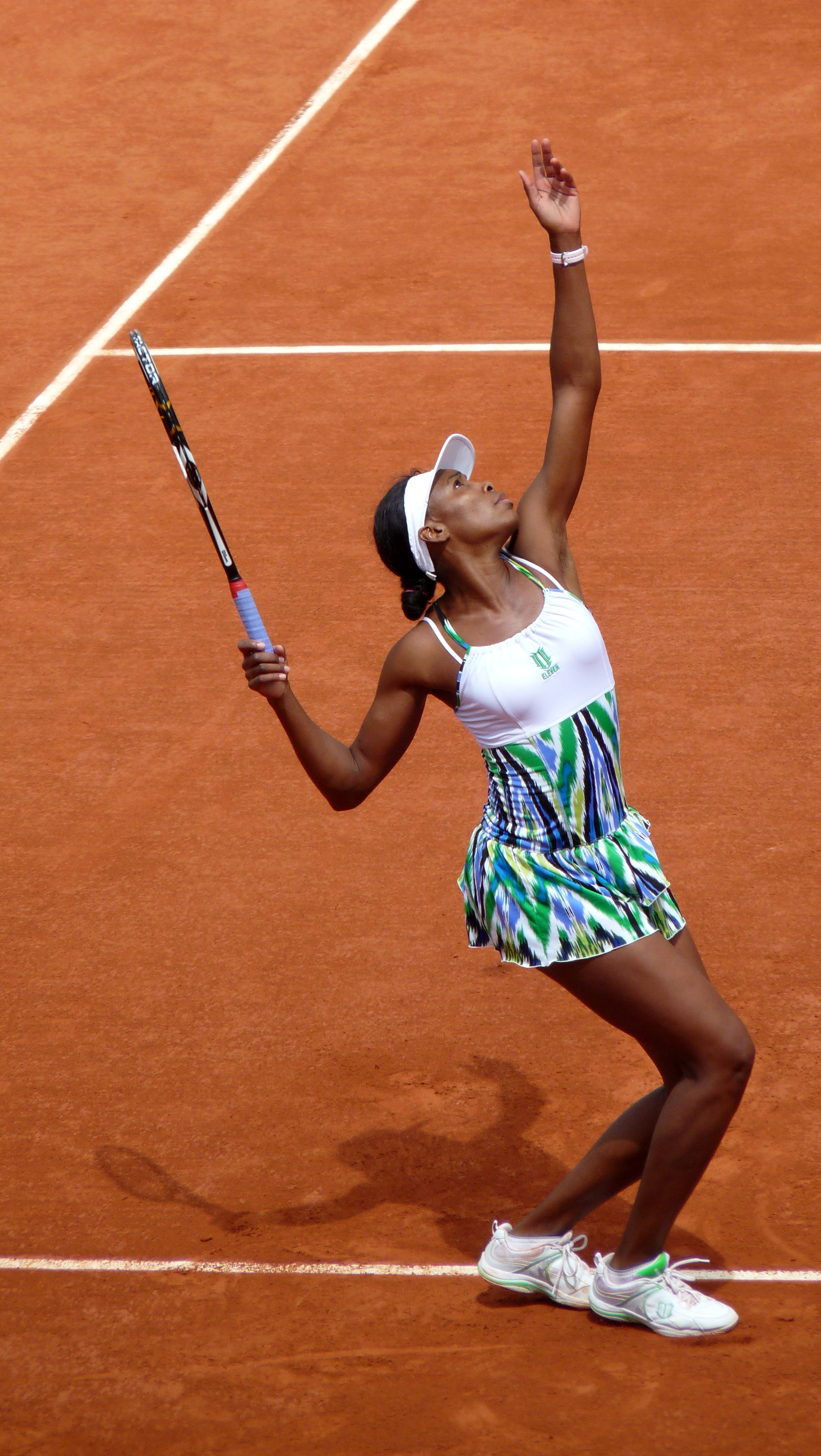
Venus Williams - 2008 Wimbledon Grand Slam singles champion

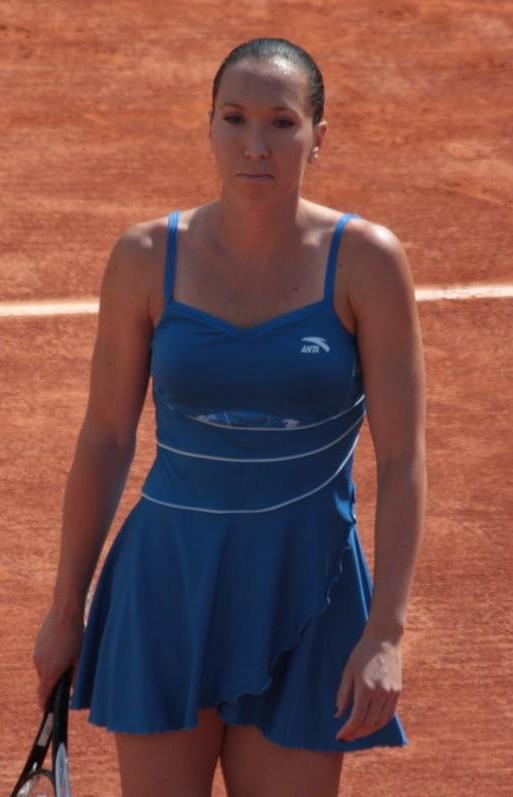
Jelena Jankovic - 2008 US Open Grand Slam singles runner-up

== Draw ==
Semifinals
(United States) Serena Williams	6
(Serbia) Ana Ivanovic	3
WC	(Serbia) Jelena Janković	4
(United States) Venus Williams	6

Final
(United States) Serena Williams	6	6
(United States) Venus Williams	4	3

=== Reception ===
The 2009 Billie Jean King Cup was questioned by some for the element of spectacle and prize money at the event. Attendance of the event was described as "so-so" (though inclement weather was cited as a valid factor). The semifinal matches, because of their brevity due to the scoring structure, were criticized as being played "largely with something like a clock-puncher's resignation". The final match between Venus and Serena Williams, however, was considered more engaging, as another match in the continuing rivalry between the Williams sisters.

Well known sports and tennis writer, Jon Wertheim praised the event in one of his SI.com mailbag entries, "Here it is, early March, traditionally, a time in the sports calendar when tennis is off the radar. And—as was the case last year when Federer played Sampras—tennis not only gets some buzz, but also 12,000 or so fans on the East Coast (and a few hundred thousand with HBO) can watch the sport live. The players get some extra cash, as well as a chance to penetrate the New York market, not insignificant if you're trying to build Ivanovic as a global star. The USTA wisely used the occasion to market the sport nationwide. BNP Paribas gets some value for their tennis investment. Everyone comes away happy. Here's hoping this is an annual event. Maybe next year you combine genders?"
