= BNP Paribas Showdown =

Former tennis tournament in New York City

Defunct tennis tournament
- Founded: 2008
- Abolished: 2017
- Location: Manhattan, New York; United States
- Venue: Madison Square Garden (2008–2017)
- Category: Exhibition
- Surface: Hard Indoor
- Draw: 4–8 players
- Website: Official website

The BNP Paribas Showdown (formerly NetJets Showdown, Billie Jean King Cup) was an annual one-night exhibition tennis event operated by GF Sports and held at Madison Square Garden in New York City in February or March from 2008 through 2017.

The Showdown was part of World Tennis Day, an initiative to increase tennis participation around the world. The event served as the kick-off to the tennis season in North America, with the United States Tennis Association (USTA) running thousands of clinics across the country throughout the spring. The event's format changed from year-to-year, including male and female players (current and retired) playing singles and doubles.

Some of the greatest players of all-time participated in the BNP Paribas Showdown, including Roger Federer, Serena Williams, Pete Sampras, Novak Djokovic, Rafael Nadal, Andy Murray and Bob & Mike Bryan.

The final Showdown on March 6, 2017, included Venus Williams, Garbiñe Muguruza, Juan Martín del Potro, Kei Nishikori, Jack Sock, Nick Kyrgios, Andy Roddick, & Lleyton Hewitt in a team format. Team World defeated Team Americas 29–24. Following the 2017 edition of the event, BNP Paribas withdrew its sponsorship and an alternate backer could not be found, so Tie Break Tens took its place at the Madison Square Garden.

== Event history ==
The event was launched in 2008 as the NetJets Showdown, and it represented a return of tennis to Madison Square Garden after almost a decade-long hiatus. A sold-out crowd watched Roger Federer and Pete Sampras—two of the most prominent players at the time—face-off. Federer defeated Sampras in a classic, 6–3, 6–7(4), 7-6(6).

2009 marked the inaugural year of the Billie Jean King Cup, and the first time that women's tennis had been played at Madison Square Garden since 2000, when the year-ending Chase Championships were held. The event featured Serena Williams, Venus Williams, Ana Ivanovic and Jelena Janković. Serena Williams won her semifinal match against Ana Ivanovic 6–3, and Venus Williams won hers 6–4 against Jelena Janković. The final was won by Serena 6–4, 6–3. The Billie Jean King Cup returned in 2010 and was won by Venus Williams.

In 2011, the event was renamed the BNP Paribas Showdown; it was a celebration of American tennis legends and two of the greatest rivalries in the sport's history: Ivan Lendl vs. John McEnroe, and Pete Sampras vs. Andre Agassi. Between 2011 and 2016, several other Grand Slam champions and former World No. 1's played at the Garden.

In 2013, the Showdown was expanded and also held in Hong Kong for the first time.

In 2014, the Showdown expanded from New York and Hong Kong to a third location: London.

The 2017 edition was played on 6 March 2017 and introduced a new "Fast Format" for the 4 matches, with the event's first-ever team format in the style of mixed doubles. Team World, captained by Lleyton Hewitt, defeated Team Americas, captained by Andy Roddick 29–24.

=== Tennis Night in America (TNIA) ===
In 2009, the USTA launched Tennis Night in America (TNIA) as one of its top national marketing programs designed to increase grassroots tennis participation. The initiative promoted a "National Junior Tennis Registration Night" at over 700 locations on March 2, which coincided with both the 2009 Showdown at Madison Square Garden and the start of that year's professional tennis season in North America.

Connecting grassroots tennis with professional tennis, TNIA was able to deliver the 2009 Showdown via closed circuit television to tennis clubs throughout the country, allowing one night in March to bring together tennis players of all ages and abilities, as they pay tribute to the game that they love so much.

=== World Tennis Day ===

In 2014, following the success of the 2013 BNP Paribas Showdown in both New York and Hong Kong, StarGames launched World Tennis Day as part of an effort to increase global tennis participation. World Tennis Day is highlighted by international grassroots initiatives and culminates with the BNP Paribas Showdown.

== List of winners ==
=== New York ===
Year	Champion	Runner-up	Score
2017	Team World	Team Americas	29–24
2016	(France) Gaël Monfils	(Switzerland) Stan Wawrinka	7–6(6), 6–3
2016	(United States) Serena Williams	(Denmark) Caroline Wozniacki	7–5, 6–4
2015	(Argentina) Gabriela Sabatini	(United States) Monica Seles	8–5
2015	(Bulgaria) Grigor Dimitrov	(Switzerland) Roger Federer	6–2, 1–6, 7–5
2014	(United States) Bob Bryan & Mike Bryan	(United States) John McEnroe & Patrick McEnroe	8–3
2014	(Serbia) Novak Djokovic	(United Kingdom) Andy Murray	6–3, 7–6(2)
2013	(United States) Serena Williams	(Belarus) Victoria Azarenka	6–4, 6–3
2013	(Argentina) Juan Martín del Potro	(Spain) Rafael Nadal	7–6(4), 6–4
2012	(Russia) Maria Sharapova	(Denmark) Caroline Wozniacki	6–3, 6–4
2012	(United States) Andy Roddick	(Switzerland) Roger Federer	7–5, 7–6(7)
2011	(United States) Ivan Lendl	(United States) John McEnroe	3–6, ret.
2011	(United States) Pete Sampras	(United States) Andre Agassi	6–3, 7–5
2010	(United States) Venus Williams	(Belgium) Kim Clijsters	6–4, 3–6, 7–5
2009	(United States) Serena Williams	(United States) Venus Williams	6–4, 6–3
2008	(Switzerland) Roger Federer	(United States) Pete Sampras	6–3, 6–7(4), 7–6(6)

=== Hong Kong ===
Year	Champion	Runner-up	Score
2014	(Australia) Sam Stosur	(China) Li Na	6–4, 6–3
2014	(Australia) Lleyton Hewitt	(Czech Republic) Tomáš Berdych	6–4, 7–5
2013	(Poland) Agnieszka Radwańska	(Denmark) Caroline Wozniacki	6–4, 6–4
2013	(United States) John McEnroe	(United States) Ivan Lendl	8–5

=== London ===
Year	Champion	Runner-up	Score
2014	(Australia) Pat Cash	(United States) Ivan Lendl	8–6
2014	(United States) Andre Agassi	(United States) Pete Sampras	6–3, 7–6(1)
