= Li Na & Friends Tennis Exhibition 2011 =

The Li Na & Friends Tennis Exhibition 2011 was a one-off women's exhibition tennis tournament, held on 17 and 18 December, featuring two of the best ranked women, Li Na and Sabine Lisicki, and men's legends Pete Sampras and Carlos Moyá. It was held in Wuhan, China, and was sponsored by IMG Worldwide.

== Matches ==
=== Day 1 ===
Women's singles
| (China) Li Na | 6 | 7 |
| (Germany) Sabine Lisicki | 3 | 6^{3} |

Mixed doubles
| (China) Li Na (United States) Pete Sampras | 7 |
| (Germany) Sabine Lisicki (Spain) Carlos Moyá | 6^{4} |

=== Day 2 ===
Men's legends singles
| (United States) Pete Sampras |
| (Spain) Carlos Moyá |

Mixed doubles
| (China) Li Na (Spain) Carlos Moyá |
| (Germany) Sabine Lisicki (United States) Pete Sampras |
