= 2010 Billie Jean King Cup =

Billie Jean King Cup

Tournament information
- Location: Manhattan, New York; United States
- Venue: Madison Square Garden
- Category: Exhibition
- Surface: Hardcourt / Indoor
- Draw: 4S
- Prize money: US$ 1,200,000
- Website: thegarden.com

The 2010 Billie Jean King Cup was the 2nd edition of this tennis exhibition tournament. Seven-time Grand Slam champion Venus Williams, 2009 French Open Champion Svetlana Kuznetsova, and 2009 US Open Champion Kim Clijsters participated. 2009 Australian Open and Wimbledon Champion Serena Williams had to withdraw from the event due to a leg injury. She was replaced by 2008 French Open Champion Ana Ivanovic. In the first semifinal, Clijsters defeated Ivanovic in a tiebreaker (7–2), despite Ivanovic having match point at 5–4 up. Williams defeated Kuznetsova in the second semifinal, 6–4. Williams defeated Clijsters in the championship match by a score of 6–4 3–6 7–5.

== Players ==
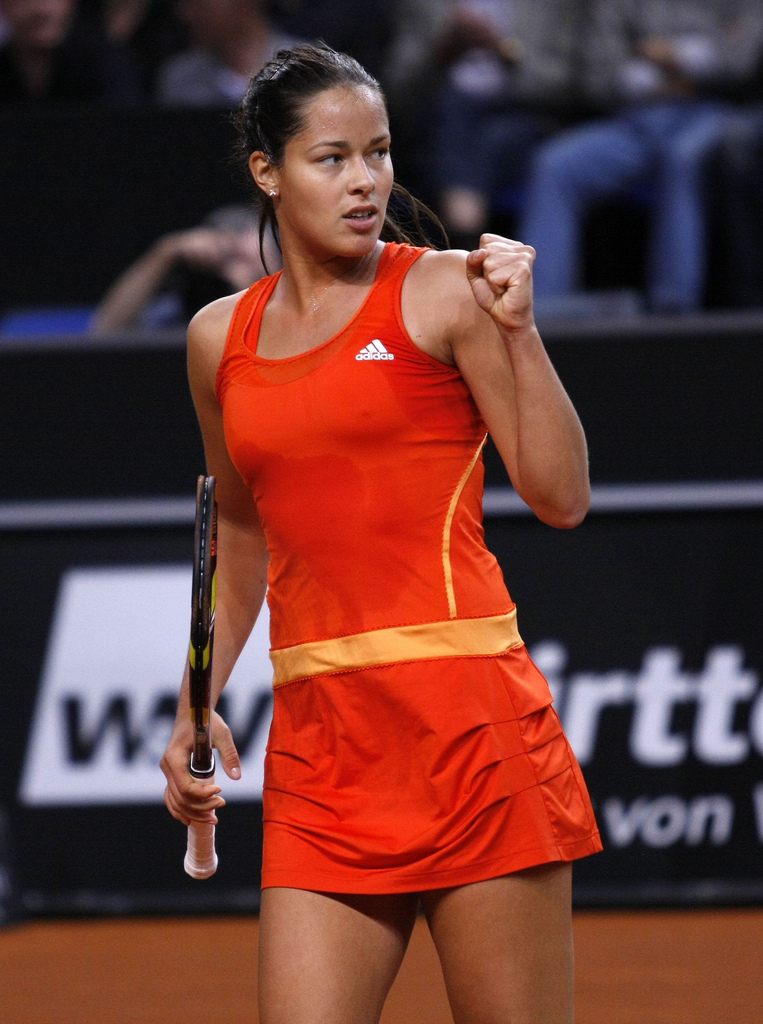
Ana Ivanovic-2008 Roland Garros Grand Slam singles champion

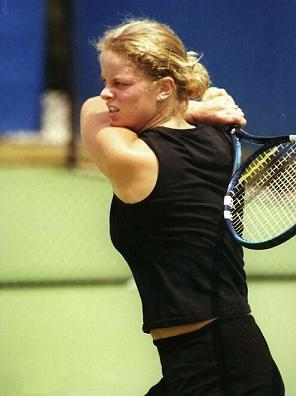
Kim Clijsters-2009 US Open Grand Slam singles champion

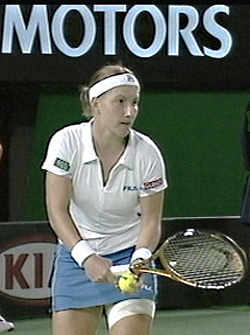
Svetlana Kuznetsova-2009 Roland Garros Grand Slam singles champion

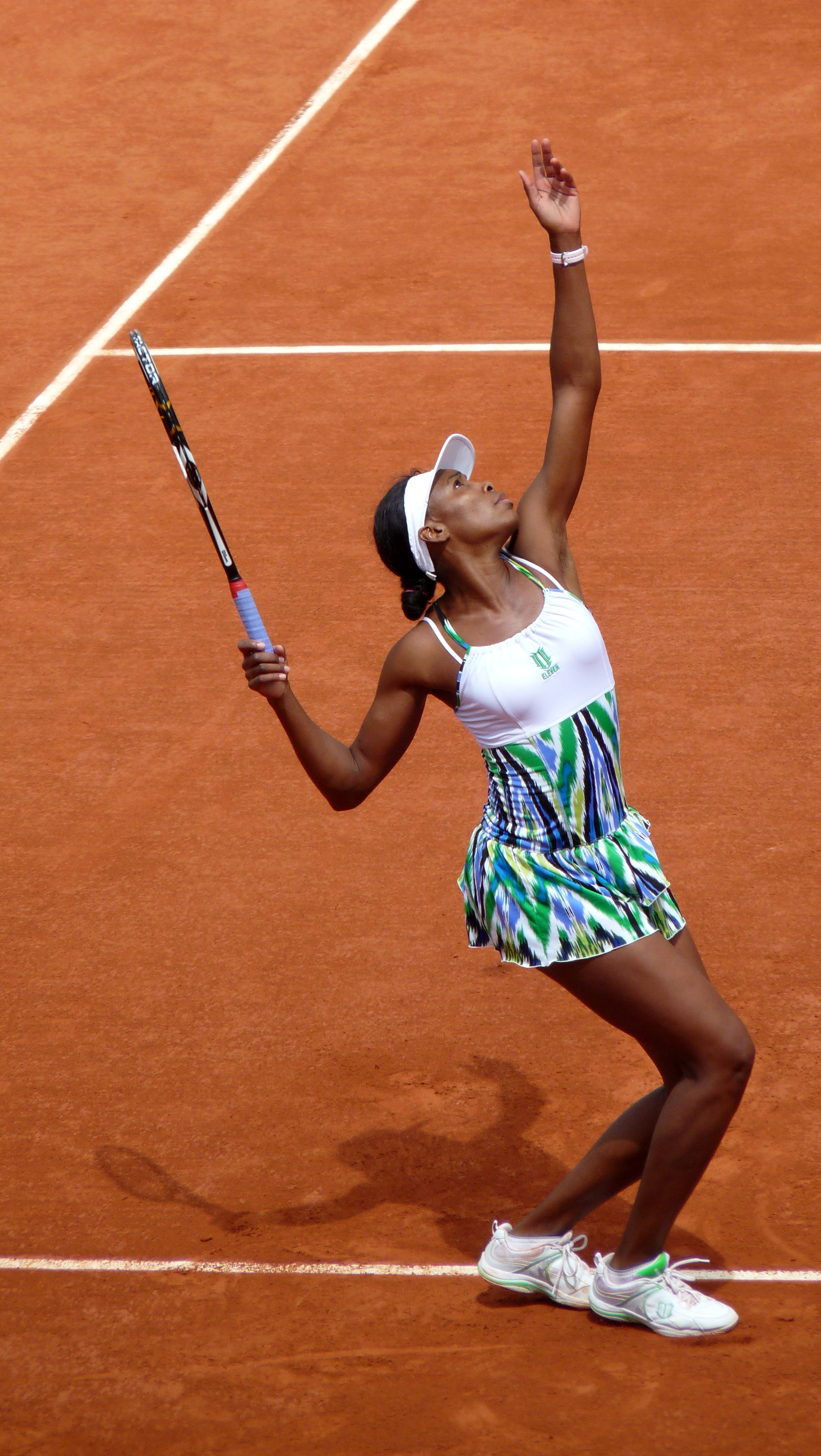
Venus Williams-2008 Wimbledon Grand Slam singles champion

== Draw ==
Semifinals
(Belgium) Kim Clijsters	7
Alt	(Serbia) Ana Ivanovic	6^{2}
WC	(United States) Venus Williams	6
(Russia) Svetlana Kuznetsova	4

Final
(Belgium) Kim Clijsters	4	6	5
WC	(United States) Venus Williams	6	3	7
