= 2014 Aegon International – Men's doubles =

Men's doubles
- 2014 Aegon International

Final
- Champions: (Philippines) Treat Huey (United Kingdom) Dominic Inglot
- Runners-up: (Austria) Alexander Peya (Brazil) Bruno Soares
- Score: 7–5, 5–7, [10–8]

Events
Singles	men	women
Doubles	men	women
← 2013 ·	Aegon International	· 2015 →

Alexander Peya and Bruno Soares were the defending champions, but lost in the final to Treat Huey and Dominic Inglot, 5–7, 7–5, [8–10].

== Seeds ==
1. (Austria) Alexander Peya / (Brazil) Bruno Soares (final)
2. (India) Leander Paes / (Pakistan) Aisam-ul-Haq Qureshi (quarterfinals)
3. (Sweden) Robert Lindstedt / (Belarus) Max Mirnyi (quarterfinals)
4. (Austria) Julian Knowle / (Brazil) Marcelo Melo (first round)

== Draw ==
=== Key ===
- Q = Qualifier
- WC = Wild card
- LL = Lucky loser
- Alt = Alternate
- SE = Special exempt
- PR = Protected ranking
- ITF = ITF entry
- JE = Junior exempt
- w/o = Walkover
- r = Retired
- d = Defaulted
- SR = Special ranking

=== Draw ===
First round
1	(Austria) A Peya (Brazil) B Soares	6	6
(Kazakhstan) M Kukushkin (Chinese Taipei) Y-h Lu	3	3
(Colombia) S Giraldo (Slovakia) M Kližan	4	7	[7]
(Spain) G García-López (Austria) P Oswald	6	5	[10]
3	(Sweden) R Lindstedt (Belarus) M Mirnyi	6^{3}	7^{7}	[10]
(Colombia) JS Cabal (Poland) M Matkowski	7^{7}	6^{4}	[8]
WC	(United Kingdom) K Skupski (United Kingdom) N Skupski	6	7^{7}
(Poland) M Fyrstenberg (Australia) C Guccione	4	6^{1}
(Uruguay) P Cuevas (Spain) D Marrero	6	6
(Germany) C Kas (France) G Simon	3	3
WC	(United Kingdom) C Fleming (United Kingdom) R Hutchins	6	6
4	(Austria) J Knowle (Brazil) M Melo	4	4
(Philippines) T Huey (United Kingdom) D Inglot	6	7^{7}
(United Kingdom) J Murray (Australia) J Peers	3	6^{4}
(Kazakhstan) A Golubev (Uzbekistan) D Istomin	4	4
2	(India) L Paes (Pakistan) A-u-H Qureshi	6	6

Quarterfinals
1	(Austria) A Peya (Brazil) B Soares	7^{7}	6
(Spain) G García-López (Austria) P Oswald	6^{5}	2
3	(Sweden) R Lindstedt (Belarus) M Mirnyi	4	7^{7}	[5]
WC	(United Kingdom) K Skupski (United Kingdom) N Skupski	6	6^{5}	[10]
(Uruguay) P Cuevas (Spain) D Marrero	3	4
WC	(United Kingdom) C Fleming (United Kingdom) R Hutchins	6	6
(Philippines) T Huey (United Kingdom) D Inglot	6	6
2	(India) L Paes (Pakistan) A-u-H Qureshi	4	3

Semifinals
1	(Austria) A Peya (Brazil) B Soares	6	7^{7}
WC	(United Kingdom) K Skupski (United Kingdom) N Skupski	3	6^{3}
WC	(United Kingdom) C Fleming (United Kingdom) R Hutchins	6^{2}	3
(Philippines) T Huey (United Kingdom) D Inglot	7^{7}	6

Final
1	(Austria) A Peya (Brazil) B Soares	5	7	[8]
(Philippines) T Huey (United Kingdom) D Inglot	7	5	[10]
