= 2015 Aegon International – Singles =

Singles
- 2015 Aegon International

Final
- Champion: (Switzerland) Belinda Bencic
- Runner-up: (Poland) Agnieszka Radwańska
- Score: 6–4, 4–6, 6–0

Events
Singles	Doubles
← 2014 ·	Aegon International	· 2016 →

Madison Keys was the defending champion, but lost in the second round to Belinda Bencic.

Bencic went on to win her maiden WTA tour title, defeating Agnieszka Radwańska in the final, 6–4, 4–6, 6–0.

== Seeds ==
All seeds received a bye into the second round.

1. (Czech Republic) Petra Kvitová (withdrew due to viral illness)
2. (Denmark) Caroline Wozniacki (semifinals, retired because of injury)
3. (Czech Republic) Lucie Šafářová (second round)
4. (Russia) Ekaterina Makarova (second round)
5. (Spain) Carla Suárez Navarro (second round)
6. (Germany) Angelique Kerber (withdrew due to viral illness)
7. (Canada) Eugenie Bouchard (third round, retired because of abdominal injury)
8. (Czech Republic) Karolína Plíšková (third round)
9. (Poland) Agnieszka Radwańska (final)
10. (Germany) Andrea Petkovic (quarterfinals)
11. (Ukraine) Elina Svitolina (second round)
12. (United States) Madison Keys (second round)
13. (Italy) Sara Errani (third round)
14. (Spain) Garbiñe Muguruza (third round)
15. (Italy) Flavia Pennetta (second round)
16. (Australia) Samantha Stosur (second round)

Click on the seed number of a player to go to their draw section.

== Draw ==
=== Key ===
- Q = Qualifier
- WC = Wild card
- LL = Lucky loser
- Alt = Alternate
- ITF = ITF entry
- PR = Protected ranking
- SR = Special ranking
- SE = Special exempt
- JE = Junior exempt
- JR = Junior Accelerator Programme entrant
- CO = College Accelerator Programme entrant
- NG = Next Gen Accelerator Program entrant
- w/o = Walkover
- r = Retired
- d = Defaulted

=== Finals ===
Quarterfinals
LL	(Russia) Daria Gavrilova
(United States) Sloane Stephens	w/o
(Bulgaria) Tsvetana Pironkova	2	2
9	(Poland) Agnieszka Radwańska	6	6
(Switzerland) Belinda Bencic	2	6	6
WC	(United Kingdom) Johanna Konta	6	0	3
10	(Germany) Andrea Petkovic	5	1
2	(Denmark) Caroline Wozniacki	7	6

Semifinals
(United States) Sloane Stephens	1	7^{7}	2
9	(Poland) Agnieszka Radwańska	6	6^{3}	6
(Switzerland) Belinda Bencic	3
2	(Denmark) Caroline Wozniacki	0^{r}

Final
9	(Poland) Agnieszka Radwańska	4	6	0
(Switzerland) Belinda Bencic	6	4	6

=== Top half ===
==== Section 1 ====
First round
Q	(United States) C McHale	2	3
(Italy) C Giorgi	6	6
(Czech Republic) B Strýcová	6	6
(Romania) I-C Begu	4	2
(United States) V Lepchenko	6^{5}	2
(United Kingdom) H Watson	7^{7}	6
WC	(United Kingdom) N Broady	6	3	6^{4}
(United States) S Stephens	3	6	7^{7}

Second round
LL	(Russia) D Gavrilova	3	7^{8}	6
(Italy) C Giorgi	6	6^{6}	3
(Czech Republic) B Strýcová	2	7^{7}	6^{7}
13	(Italy) S Errani	6	6^{1}	7^{9}
11	(Ukraine) E Svitolina	6	5	4
(United Kingdom) H Watson	3	7	6
(United States) S Stephens	6	7
5	(Spain) C Suárez Navarro	1	5

Third round
LL	(Russia) D Gavrilova	6	5	6
13	(Italy) S Errani	1	7	2
(United Kingdom) H Watson	2	3
(United States) S Stephens	6	6

Quarterfinals
LL	(Russia) D Gavrilova
(United States) S Stephens	w/o

==== Section 2 ====
First round
WC	(United Kingdom) H Dart	1	3
(Slovakia) D Cibulková	6	6
Q	(New Zealand) M Erakovic	2	2
(Bulgaria) T Pironkova	6	6
Q	(United States) I Falconi	6	6
Q	(Romania) A Dulgheru	1	1
(Australia) C Dellacqua	6	6
(Slovakia) AK Schmiedlová	2	4

Second round
3	(Czech Republic) L Šafářová	6^{7}	4
(Slovakia) D Cibulková	7^{9}	6
(Bulgaria) T Pironkova	7	7^{7}
16	(Australia) S Stosur	5	6^{0}
9	(Poland) A Radwańska	6	6
Q	(United States) I Falconi	0	2
(Australia) C Dellacqua	4	5
8	(Czech Republic) Ka Plíšková	6	7

Third round
(Slovakia) D Cibulková	7^{7}	4	1
(Bulgaria) T Pironkova	6^{4}	6	6
9	(Poland) A Radwańska	6	6
8	(Czech Republic) Ka Plíšková	2	1

Quarterfinals
(Bulgaria) T Pironkova	2	2
9	(Poland) A Radwańska	6	6

=== Bottom half ===
==== Section 3 ====
First round
(United States) A Riske	6	6
(France) A Cornet	0	3
(Germany) M Barthel	4	6^{7}
(Switzerland) B Bencic	6	7^{9}
(United States) M Brengle	5	4
Q	(Slovenia) P Hercog	7	6
WC	(United Kingdom) J Konta	6	6
(Kazakhstan) Z Diyas	3	2

Second round
7	(Canada) E Bouchard	7^{7}	6
(United States) A Riske	6^{5}	3
(Switzerland) B Bencic	6	6
12	(United States) M Keys	2	2
14	(Spain) G Muguruza	5	6	6
Q	(Slovenia) P Hercog	7	3	0
WC	(United Kingdom) J Konta	6	6
4	(Russia) E Makarova	2	4

Third round
7	(Canada) E Bouchard	4	0^{r}
(Switzerland) B Bencic	6	3
14	(Spain) G Muguruza	4	6	3
WC	(United Kingdom) J Konta	6	4	6

Quarterfinals
(Switzerland) B Bencic	2	6	6
WC	(United Kingdom) J Konta	6	0	3

==== Section 4 ====
First round
(Sweden) J Larsson	7^{7}	1	1
(United States) C Vandeweghe	6^{3}	6	6
(France) C Garcia	6	6
(Italy) R Vinci	2	2
Q	(Slovakia) M Rybáriková	6^{5}	4
(Russia) S Kuznetsova	7^{7}	6
Q	(Australia) J Gajdošová	2	6	6
Q	(United States) L Davis	6	2	1

Second round
LL	(Romania) M Niculescu	5	6	1
(United States) C Vandeweghe	7	2	6
(France) C Garcia	2	4
10	(Germany) A Petkovic	6	6
15	(Italy) F Pennetta	3	4
(Russia) S Kuznetsova	6	6
Q	(Australia) J Gajdošová	6^{4}	2
2	(Denmark) C Wozniacki	7^{7}	6

Third round
(United States) C Vandeweghe	3	4
10	(Germany) A Petkovic	6	6
(Russia) S Kuznetsova	7^{7}	3	1
2	(Denmark) C Wozniacki	6^{3}	6	6

Quarterfinals
10	(Germany) A Petkovic	5	1
2	(Denmark) C Wozniacki	7	6

== Qualifying ==
=== Seeds ===
1. (Russia) Daria Gavrilova (qualifying competition, lucky loser)
2. (Romania) Monica Niculescu (qualifying competition, lucky loser)
3. (Serbia) Bojana Jovanovski (first round)
4. (Croatia) Mirjana Lučić-Baroni (first round)
5. (Czech Republic) Lucie Hradecká (withdrew, still playing in Birmingham)
6. (Germany) Julia Görges (first round)
7. (Japan) Kurumi Nara (qualifying competition)
8. (Slovakia) Magdaléna Rybáriková (qualified)
9. (Australia) Jarmila Gajdošová (qualified)
10. (Romania) Alexandra Dulgheru (qualified)
11. (Czech Republic) Tereza Smitková (first round)
12. (United States) Lauren Davis (qualified)
13. (China) Zheng Saisai (qualifying competition)
14. (Ukraine) Lesia Tsurenko (first round)
15. (United States) Christina McHale (qualified)
16. (United States) Irina Falconi (qualified)

=== Qualifiers ===
1. (New Zealand) Marina Erakovic
2. (United States) Christina McHale
3. (United States) Irina Falconi
4. (Slovenia) Polona Hercog
5. (United States) Lauren Davis
6. (Australia) Jarmila Gajdošová
7. (Romania) Alexandra Dulgheru
8. (Slovakia) Magdaléna Rybáriková

=== Lucky losers ===
1. (Russia) Daria Gavrilova
2. (Romania) Monica Niculescu

=== Draw ===
==== First qualifier ====
First round
1	(Russia) Daria Gavrilova	6	6
WC	(United Kingdom) Laura Robson	0	1
(New Zealand) Marina Erakovic	6	6
14	(Ukraine) Lesia Tsurenko	2	3

Qualifying competition
1	(Russia) Daria Gavrilova	6^{4}	6	4
(New Zealand) Marina Erakovic	7^{7}	2	6

==== Second qualifier ====
First round
2	(Romania) Monica Niculescu	7	7
(Hungary) Tímea Babos	5	5
(Belgium) Yanina Wickmayer	4	2
15	(United States) Christina McHale	6	6

Qualifying competition
2	(Romania) Monica Niculescu	6	5	0
15	(United States) Christina McHale	1	7	6

==== Third qualifier ====
First round
3	(Serbia) Bojana Jovanovski	6^{7}	1
(Croatia) Ajla Tomljanović	7^{9}	6
(Belgium) Kirsten Flipkens	6	3	3
16	(United States) Irina Falconi	3	6	6

Qualifying competition
(Croatia) Ajla Tomljanović	6^{5}	3
16	(United States) Irina Falconi	7^{7}	6

==== Fourth qualifier ====
First round
4	(Croatia) Mirjana Lučić-Baroni	7^{7}	5	5
(Slovenia) Polona Hercog	6^{3}	7	7
(Serbia) Aleksandra Krunić	6	7^{7}
11	(Czech Republic) Tereza Smitková	4	6^{4}

Qualifying competition
(Slovenia) Polona Hercog	6	6
(Serbia) Aleksandra Krunić	2	0

==== Fifth qualifier ====
First round
Alt	(United States) Nicole Gibbs	5	3
(Czech Republic) Klára Koukalová	7	6
(Russia) Elena Vesnina	7^{7}	1	3
12	(United States) Lauren Davis	6^{4}	6	6

Qualifying competition
(Czech Republic) Klára Koukalová	3	6	5
12	(United States) Lauren Davis	6	1	7

==== Sixth qualifier ====
First round
6	(Germany) Julia Görges	6^{5}	7^{7}	2
(Germany) Tatjana Maria	7^{7}	6^{1}	6
WC	(United Kingdom) Laura Deigman	2	5
9	(Australia) Jarmila Gajdošová	6	7

Qualifying competition
(Germany) Tatjana Maria	4	1
9	(Australia) Jarmila Gajdošová	6	6

==== Seventh qualifier ====
First round
7	(Japan) Kurumi Nara	7^{12}	6
(Spain) Lara Arruabarrena	6^{10}	2
WC	(United Kingdom) Naomi Cavaday	2	1
10	(Romania) Alexandra Dulgheru	6	6

Qualifying competition
7	(Japan) Kurumi Nara	5	2
10	(Romania) Alexandra Dulgheru	7	6

==== Eighth qualifier ====
First round
8	(Slovakia) Magdaléna Rybáriková	6	6
(Puerto Rico) Monica Puig	2	2
WC	(United Kingdom) Emily Webley-Smith	1	4
13	(China) Zheng Saisai	6	6

Qualifying competition
8	(Slovakia) Magdaléna Rybáriková	6	6
13	(China) Zheng Saisai	2	3
