= 2014 Bank of the West Classic – Singles =

Singles
- 2014 Bank of the West Classic

Final
- Champion: (United States) Serena Williams
- Runner-up: (Germany) Angelique Kerber
- Score: 7–6^{(7–1)}, 6–3

Details
- Draw: 28
- Seeds: 8

Events
Singles	Doubles
- Bank of the West Classic

Serena Williams defeated Angelique Kerber in the final, 7–6^{(7–1)}, 6–3 to win the singles tennis title at the 2014 Bank of the West Classic.

Dominika Cibulková was the defending champion, but lost to Garbiñe Muguruza in the first round.

Sabine Lisicki hit the fastest serve of all time in women's tennis, blasting a 131 mph serve against Ana Ivanovic in the first round. As a result of her quarterfinals run, former world No. 1 Ivanovic returned to top ten in the WTA rankings for the first time since the 2009 French Open.

This tournament marked the WTA Tour main-draw debut of future four-time major champion and world No. 1, Naomi Osaka.

== Seeds ==
The top four seeds receive a bye into the second round.

1. (United States) Serena Williams (champion)
2. (Poland) Agnieszka Radwańska (second round)
3. (Germany) Angelique Kerber (final)
4. (Belarus) Victoria Azarenka (second round)
5. (Serbia) Ana Ivanovic (Quarterfinal)
6. (Slovakia) Dominika Cibulková (first round)
7. (Spain) Carla Suárez Navarro (first round)
8. (Germany) Andrea Petkovic (semifinals)

== Draw ==
Key

- Q = Qualifier
- WC = Wild card
- LL = Lucky loser
- Alt = Alternate
- ITF = ITF entry
- PR = Protected ranking
- SR = Special ranking
- SE = Special exempt
- JE = Junior exempt
- JR = Junior Accelerator Programme entrant
- CO = College Accelerator Programme entrant
- NG = Next Gen Accelerator Program entrant
- w/o = Walkover
- r = Retired
- d = Defaulted

=== Finals ===
Semifinals
1	(United States) Serena Williams	7	6
8	(Germany) Andrea Petkovic	5	0
3	(Germany) Angelique Kerber	4	7^{7}	6
(United States) Varvara Lepchenko	6	6^{4}	2

Final
1	(United States) Serena Williams	7^{7}	6
3	(Germany) Angelique Kerber	6^{1}	3

=== Top half ===
First round
(Japan) K Date-Krumm	1	3
(Czech Republic) Ka Plíšková	6	6
Q	(Canada) C Zhao	6	1
(Belgium) Y Wickmayer	2	0^{r}
(Germany) S Lisicki	6^{2}	1
5	(Serbia) A Ivanovic	7^{7}	6
WC	(United States) V Williams	6	6
Q	(Poland) P Kania	3	2
(Australia) S Stosur	6	6^{7}	5
Q	(Japan) N Osaka	4	7^{9}	7
(Croatia) A Tomljanović	1	4
8	(Germany) A Petkovic	6	6

Second round
1	(United States) S Williams	7	6
(Czech Republic) Ka Plíšková	5	2
Q	(Canada) C Zhao	1	1
5	(Serbia) A Ivanovic	6	6
4/WC	(Belarus) V Azarenka	4	6^{1}
WC	(United States) V Williams	6	7^{7}
Q	(Japan) N Osaka	2	2
8	(Germany) A Petkovic	6	6

Quarterfinals
1	(United States) S Williams	2	6	7
5	(Serbia) A Ivanovic	6	3	5
WC	(United States) V Williams	1	6	5
8	(Germany) A Petkovic	6	3	7

Semifinals
1	(United States) S Williams	7	6
8	(Germany) A Petkovic	5	0

=== Bottom half ===
First round
6	(Slovakia) D Cibulková	2	6	2
(Spain) G Muguruza	6	4	6
(Argentina) P Ormaechea	3	4
(Slovakia) D Hantuchová	6	6
(United States) C Vandeweghe	6	7
WC	(United States) K Ahn	2	5
7	(Spain) C Suárez Navarro	3	5
(Puerto Rico) M Puig	6	7
Q	(United States) S Vickery	6	6
(China) S Zhang	1	2
(France) C Garcia	4	3
(United States) V Lepchenko	6	6

Second round
(Spain) G Muguruza	6	6
(Slovakia) D Hantuchová	4	4
(United States) C Vandeweghe	6^{4}	6	2
3	(Germany) A Kerber	7^{7}	0	6
(Puerto Rico) M Puig	7^{7}	2	1
Q	(United States) S Vickery	6^{4}	6	6
(United States) V Lepchenko	6	3	6
2	(Poland) A Radwańska	3	6	4

Quarterfinals
(Spain) G Muguruza	2	1
3	(Germany) A Kerber	6	6
Q	(United States) S Vickery	1	0
(United States) V Lepchenko	6	6

Semifinals
3	(Germany) A Kerber	4	7^{7}	6
(United States) V Lepchenko	6	6^{4}	2

== Qualifying ==
=== Seeds ===
1. (Canada) Aleksandra Wozniak (qualifying competition)
2. (Czech Republic) Kateřina Siniaková (first round)
3. (Croatia) Mirjana Lučić-Baroni (first round)
4. (Russia) Alla Kudryavtseva (first round)
5. (Poland) Paula Kania (qualified)
6. (United States) Sachia Vickery (qualified)
7. (Croatia) Petra Martić (qualifying competition)
8. (China) Xu Yifan (withdrew, playing in Nanchang doubles final)
9. (Russia) Marina Shamayko (qualifying competition)

=== Qualifiers ===
1. (United States) Sachia Vickery
2. (Canada) Carol Zhao
3. (Poland) Paula Kania
4. (Japan) Naomi Osaka

=== Qualifying draw ===
==== First qualifier ====
First round
1	(Canada) Aleksandra Wozniak	7	6
WC	(United States) Caroline Doyle	5	3
WC	(United States) Michaela Gordon	4	1
6	(United States) Sachia Vickery	6	6

Qualifying competition
1	(Canada) Aleksandra Wozniak	4	1
6	(United States) Sachia Vickery	6	6

==== Second qualifier ====
First round
2	(Czech Republic) Kateřina Siniaková	7	4	6^{3}
WC	(Canada) Carol Zhao	5	6	7^{7}
Alt	(Japan) Mari Osaka	6	3	3
9	(Russia) Marina Shamayko	2	6	6

Qualifying competition
WC	(Canada) Carol Zhao	6	1	6
9	(Russia) Marina Shamayko	1	6	4

==== Third qualifier ====
First round
3	(Croatia) Mirjana Lučić-Baroni	2	6^{8}
WC	(United States) Raquel Kops-Jones	6	7^{10}
(Russia) Daria Gavrilova	6	3	4
5	(Poland) Paula Kania	3	6	6

Qualifying competition
WC	(United States) Raquel Kops-Jones	4	1
5	(Poland) Paula Kania	6	6

==== Fourth qualifier ====
First round
4	(Russia) Alla Kudryavtseva	4	6	1
(Japan) Naomi Osaka	6	3	6
(Spain) Arantxa Parra Santonja	4	2
7	(Croatia) Petra Martić	6	6

Qualifying competition
(Japan) Naomi Osaka	6^{4}	6	6
7	(Croatia) Petra Martić	7^{7}	4	1
