= 2014 Aegon International =

- Date: 16–21 June
- Edition: 6th (men); 40th (women)
- Category: ATP World Tour 250 (men); WTA Premier (women)
- Draw: 28S / 16D; 32S / 16D
- Prize money: €503,185 $710,000
- Surface: Grass
- Location: Eastbourne, United Kingdom
- Venue: Devonshire Park LTC

Champions

Men's singles
- (Spain) Feliciano López

Women's singles
- (United States) Madison Keys

Men's doubles
- (Philippines) Treat Huey / (United Kingdom) Dominic Inglot

Women's doubles
- (Chinese Taipei) Chan Hao-ching / (Chinese Taipei) Chan Yung-jan
- Aegon International

The 2014 Aegon International was a combined men's and women's tennis tournament played on outdoor grass courts. It was the 40th edition of the event for the women and the 6th edition for the men. It was classified as a WTA Premier tournament on the 2014 WTA Tour and as an ATP World Tour 250 series on the 2014 ATP World Tour. The event took place at the Devonshire Park Lawn Tennis Club in Eastbourne, England from 16 June through 21 June 2014. Feliciano López and Madison Keys won the singles titles.

== Finals ==
=== Men's singles ===
- (Spain) Feliciano López defeated (France) Richard Gasquet, 6–3, 6–7^{(5–7)}, 7–5

=== Women's singles ===
- (United States) Madison Keys defeated (Germany) Angelique Kerber, 6–3, 3–6, 7–5

=== Men's doubles ===
- (Philippines) Treat Huey / (United Kingdom) Dominic Inglot defeated (Austria) Alexander Peya / (Brazil) Bruno Soares, 7–5, 5–7, [10–8]

=== Women's doubles ===
- (Chinese Taipei) Chan Hao-ching / (Chinese Taipei) Chan Yung-jan defeated (Switzerland) Martina Hingis / (Italy) Flavia Pennetta, 6–3, 5–7, [10–7]

== Points and prize money ==
=== Point distribution ===
Event	W	F	SF	QF	Round of 16	Round of 32	Q	Q3	Q2	Q1
Men's singles	250	150	90	45	20	0	12	6	0	0
Men's doubles	250	150	90	45	0	—N/a	—N/a	—N/a	—N/a	—N/a
Women's singles	470	305	185	100	55	1	25	18	13	1
Women's doubles	470	305	185	100	1	—N/a	—N/a	—N/a	—N/a	—N/a

=== Prize money ===
Event	W	F	SF	QF	Round of 16	Round of 32	Q3	Q2	Q1
Men's singles	€91,200	€48,000	€28,000	€14,820	€8,735	€5,175	€835	€400	€0
Women's singles	$120,000	$64,000	$34,400	$18,430	$9,870	$4,740	$2,825	$1,500	$850
Men's doubles	€27,700	€14,560	€7,900	€4,520	€2,650	—N/a	—N/a	—N/a	—N/a
Women's doubles	$38,000	$20,000	$11,000	$5,600	$3,035	—N/a	—N/a	—N/a	—N/a

== ATP singles main-draw entrants ==
=== Seeds ===
Country	Player	Rank^{1}	Seed
FRA	Richard Gasquet	14	1
~~UKR~~	~~Alexandr Dolgopolov~~	~~19~~	~~2~~
ESP	Feliciano López	29	3
ESP	Guillermo García López	31	4
CRO	Ivo Karlović	33	5
FRA	Gilles Simon	36	6
COL	Santiago Giraldo	37	7
ARG	Federico Delbonis	39	8

- ^{1} Rankings are as of 9 June 2014.

=== Other entrants ===
The following players received wildcards into the main draw:

- (United Kingdom) Kyle Edmund
- (United Kingdom) Daniel Evans
- (United Kingdom) James Ward

The following players received entry from the qualifying draw:

- (Australia) Chris Guccione
- (Germany) Tobias Kamke
- (Russia) Andrey Kuznetsov
- (Slovenia) Blaž Rola

The following player received entry as a lucky loser:

- (Dominican Republic) Víctor Estrella Burgos

=== Withdrawals ===
Before the tournament

- (Croatia) Ivan Dodig
- (Ukraine) Alexandr Dolgopolov
- (Russia) Teymuraz Gabashvili
- (Italy) Andreas Seppi
- (Czech Republic) Radek Štěpánek

=== Retirements ===
- (Dominican Republic) Víctor Estrella Burgos
- (Slovenia) Blaž Rola

== ATP doubles main-draw entrants ==
=== Seeds ===
Country	Player	Country	Player	Rank^{1}	Seed
AUT	Alexander Peya	BRA	Bruno Soares	6	1
IND	Leander Paes	PAK	Aisam-ul-Haq Qureshi	33	2
SWE	Robert Lindstedt	BLR	Max Mirnyi	38	3
AUT	Julian Knowle	BRA	Marcelo Melo	47	4

- ^{1} Rankings are as of 9 June 2014.

=== Other entrants ===
The following pairs received wildcards into the doubles main draw:

- (United Kingdom) Colin Fleming / (United Kingdom) Ross Hutchins
- (United Kingdom) Ken Skupski / (United Kingdom) Neal Skupski

== WTA singles main-draw entrants ==
=== Seeds ===
Country	Player	Rank^{1}	Seed
POL	Agnieszka Radwańska	4	1
CZE	Petra Kvitová	6	2
SRB	Jelena Janković	7	3
BLR	Victoria Azarenka	8	4
GER	Angelique Kerber	9	5
ITA	Flavia Pennetta	11	6
ITA	Sara Errani	14	7
DEN	Caroline Wozniacki	16	8

- ^{1} Rankings are as of 9 June 2014.

=== Other entrants ===
The following players received wildcards into the main draw:

- (Belarus) Victoria Azarenka
- (United Kingdom) Johanna Konta
- (United Kingdom) Heather Watson

The following players received entry from the qualifying draw:

- (Switzerland) Belinda Bencic
- (United States) Lauren Davis
- (Chinese Taipei) Hsieh Su-wei
- (Italy) Francesca Schiavone

=== Withdrawals ===
Before the tournament

- (Romania) Sorana Cîrstea --> replaced by Varvara Lepchenko
- (Russia) Svetlana Kuznetsova --> replaced by Camila Giorgi

During the tournament

- (Czech Republic) Petra Kvitová (right leg injury)

== WTA doubles main-draw entrants ==
=== Seeds ===
Country	Player	Country	Player	Rank^{1}	Seed
ITA	Sara Errani	ITA	Roberta Vinci	6	1
CZE	Květa Peschke	SLO	Katarina Srebotnik	12	2
ZIM	Cara Black	IND	Sania Mirza	16	3
RUS	Ekaterina Makarova	RUS	Elena Vesnina	17	4

- ^{1} Rankings are as of 9 June 2014.

=== Other entrants ===
The following pairs received wildcards into the doubles main draw:

- (Serbia) Jelena Janković / (Italy) Francesca Schiavone
- (Germany) Angelique Kerber / (Czech Republic) Petra Kvitová
- (United Kingdom) Jocelyn Rae / (United Kingdom) Anna Smith
