= 2013 Bank of the West Classic =

- Date: 22–28 July
- Edition: 42nd
- Category: WTA Premier
- Surface: Hard
- Location: Stanford, California, United States

Champions

Singles
- (Slovakia) Dominika Cibulková

Doubles
- (United States) Raquel Kops-Jones / (United States) Abigail Spears
- Stanford Classic

The 2013 Bank of the West Classic was a professional tennis tournament played on hard courts. It was the 42nd edition of the tournament, which was part of the WTA Premier tournaments of the 2013 WTA Tour. It took place in Stanford, California, United States between 22 and 28 July 2013. It was the first event on the 2013 US Open Series.

== Singles main-draw entrants ==
=== Seeds ===
Country	Player	Rank^{1}	Seed
POL	Agnieszka Radwańska	4	1
AUS	Samantha Stosur	13	2
SVK	Dominika Cibulková	21	3
USA	Jamie Hampton	29	4
ROU	Sorana Cîrstea	32	5
USA	Varvara Lepchenko	36	6
POL	Urszula Radwańska	40	7
SVK	Magdaléna Rybáriková	41	8

- ^{1} Rankings are as of July 15, 2013

=== Other entrants ===
The following players received wildcards into the singles main draw:

- (United States) Nicole Gibbs
- (Croatia) Ajla Tomljanović

The following players received entry from the qualifying draw:

- (Russia) Vera Dushevina
- (Russia) Alla Kudryavtseva
- (Portugal) Michelle Larcher de Brito
- (United States) CoCo Vandeweghe

=== Withdrawals ===
Before the tournament

- (France) Marion Bartoli (hamstring strain)
- (Belgium) Kirsten Flipkens
- (Germany) Sabine Lisicki (wrist injury)
- (Russia) Maria Sharapova (hip injury)

=== Retirements ===
- (Russia) Alla Kudryavtseva (heat illness)

== Doubles main-draw entrants ==
=== Seeds ===
Country	Player	Country	Player	Rank^{1}	Seed
USA	Raquel Kops-Jones	USA	Abigail Spears	34	1
GER	Julia Görges	CRO	Darija Jurak	63	2
SVK	Daniela Hantuchová	USA	Lisa Raymond	69	3
TPE	Chan Hao-ching	RUS	Vera Dushevina	95	4

- ^{1} Rankings are as of July 15, 2013

=== Other entrants ===
The following pair received a wildcard into the doubles main draw:

- (United States) Nicole Gibbs / (United States) CoCo Vandeweghe

=== Withdrawals ===
During the tournament

- (Italy) Francesca Schiavone (viral illness)

== Finals ==
=== Singles ===
- (Slovakia) Dominika Cibulková defeated (Poland) Agnieszka Radwańska, 3–6, 6–4, 6–4

=== Doubles ===
- (United States) Raquel Kops-Jones / (United States) Abigail Spears defeated (Germany) Julia Görges / (Croatia) Darija Jurak, 6–2, 7–6^{(7–4)}
