= 2013 Bank of the West Classic – Singles =

Singles
- 2013 Bank of the West Classic

Final
- Champion: (Slovakia) Dominika Cibulková
- Runner-up: (Poland) Agnieszka Radwańska
- Score: 3–6, 6–4, 6–4

Details
- Draw: 28
- Seeds: 8

Events
Singles	Doubles
- Bank of the West Classic

Serena Williams was the two-time defending champion, but she decided not to participate this year.

Dominika Cibulková won the title, defeating Agnieszka Radwańska in the final, 3–6, 6–4, 6–4.

== Seeds ==
The top four seeds received a bye into the second round.

1. (Poland) Agnieszka Radwańska (final)
2. (Australia) Samantha Stosur (second round)
3. (Slovakia) Dominika Cibulková (champion)
4. (United States) Jamie Hampton (semifinals)
5. (Romania) Sorana Cîrstea (semifinals)
6. (United States) Varvara Lepchenko (quarterfinals)
7. (Poland) Urszula Radwańska (quarterfinals)
8. (Slovakia) Magdaléna Rybáriková (first round)

== Draw ==
Key

- Q = Qualifier
- WC = Wild card
- LL = Lucky loser
- Alt = Alternate
- ITF = ITF entry
- PR = Protected ranking
- SR = Special ranking
- SE = Special exempt
- JE = Junior exempt
- JR = Junior Accelerator Programme entrant
- CO = College Accelerator Programme entrant
- NG = Next Gen Accelerator Program entrant
- w/o = Walkover
- r = Retired
- d = Defaulted

=== Finals ===
Semifinals
1	(Poland) Agnieszka Radwańska	6	6
4	(United States) Jamie Hampton	3	2
3	(Slovakia) Dominika Cibulková	6	6
5	(Romania) Sorana Cîrstea	4	0

Final
1	(Poland) Agnieszka Radwańska	6	4	4
3	(Slovakia) Dominika Cibulková	3	6	6

=== Top half ===
First round
(United States) M Burdette	5	3
(Italy) F Schiavone	7	6
Q	(Russia) A Kudryavtseva	1	7^{7}	0^{r}
(Austria) T Paszek	6	6^{4}	3
Q	(Portugal) M Larcher de Brito	2	4
6	(United States) V Lepchenko	6	6
(Netherlands) K Bertens	4	1
WC	(United States) N Gibbs	6	6
Q	(Russia) V Dushevina	6	6
(New Zealand) M Erakovic	2	1
(United States) M Keys	6	6
8	(Slovakia) M Rybáriková	2	2

Second round
1	(Poland) A Radwańska	6	6
(Italy) F Schiavone	4	3
(Austria) T Paszek	4	4
6	(United States) V Lepchenko	6	6
4	(United States) J Hampton	7	6^{5}	6
WC	(United States) N Gibbs	5	7^{7}	3
Q	(Russia) V Dushevina	7^{7}	6
(United States) M Keys	6^{0}	2

Quarterfinals
1	(Poland) A Radwańska	7^{7}	3	6
6	(United States) V Lepchenko	6^{2}	6	3
4	(United States) J Hampton	6	6
Q	(Russia) V Dushevina	4	3

Semifinals
1	(Poland) A Radwańska	6	6
4	(United States) J Hampton	3	2

=== Bottom half ===
First round
7	(Poland) U Radwańska	6	6
(United States) C McHale	1	3
(Belgium) Y Wickmayer	2	6	0
(Slovakia) D Hantuchová	6	4	6
(Switzerland) S Vögele	6	6
WC	(Croatia) A Tomljanović	4	0
5	(Romania) S Cîrstea	6	6
(Japan) A Morita	2	2
Q	(United States) C Vandeweghe	6	6
(Romania) M Niculescu	0	3
(Germany) J Görges	6^{2}	2
(Belarus) O Govortsova	7^{7}	6

Second round
7	(Poland) U Radwańska	7^{7}	7^{7}
(Slovakia) D Hantuchová	6^{3}	6^{3}
(Switzerland) S Vögele	5	6^{5}
3	(Slovakia) D Cibulková	7	7^{7}
5	(Romania) S Cîrstea	6	6
Q	(United States) C Vandeweghe	3	3
(Belarus) O Govortsova	6	6
2	(Australia) S Stosur	2	4

Quarterfinals
7	(Poland) U Radwańska	5	3
3	(Slovakia) D Cibulková	7	6
5	(Romania) S Cîrstea	6	6
(Belarus) O Govortsova	3	2

Semifinals
3	(Slovakia) D Cibulková	6	6
5	(Romania) S Cîrstea	4	0

== Qualifying ==
=== Seeds ===
The top six seeds received a bye into the second round.

1. (Russia) Olga Puchkova (qualifying competition)
2. (Portugal) Michelle Larcher de Brito (qualified)
3. (Canada) Sharon Fichman (qualifying competition)
4. (Russia) Alla Kudryavtseva (qualified)
5. (Russia) Vera Dushevina (qualified)
6. (Australia) Sacha Jones (qualifying competition)
7. (Canada) Gabriela Dabrowski (second round)
8. (Japan) Sachie Ishizu (second round)

=== Qualifiers ===
1. (Russia) Vera Dushevina
2. (Portugal) Michelle Larcher de Brito
3. (United States) CoCo Vandeweghe
4. (Russia) Alla Kudryavtseva

=== Qualifying draw ===
==== First qualifier ====
First round					Second round				Qualifying competition
					1	(Russia) Olga Puchkova	6	6
	(Slovenia) Petra Rampre	2	6	6		(Slovenia) Petra Rampre	2	1
WC	(United States) Krista Hardebeck	6	3	2					1	(Russia) Olga Puchkova	4	4
	(United States) Abigail Spears	6	4	1					5	(Russia) Vera Dushevina	6	6
WC	(United States) Kristie Ahn	1	6	6	WC	(United States) Kristie Ahn	1	3
					5	(Russia) Vera Dushevina	6	6

==== Second qualifier ====
First round
(United States) Julia Boserup	6	6
(Poland) Alicja Rosolska	0	2
(South Africa) Natalie Grandin	7	6
(Japan) Miki Miyamura	5	4
WC	(United States) Stacey Tan	1	3
8	(Japan) Sachie Ishizu	6	6

Second round
2	(Portugal) Michelle Larcher de Brito	6	3	6
(United States) Julia Boserup	3	6	3
(South Africa) Natalie Grandin	6	6^{7}	7
8	(Japan) Sachie Ishizu	4	7^{9}	5

Qualifying competition
2	(Portugal) Michelle Larcher de Brito	6	6
(South Africa) Natalie Grandin	3	2

==== Third qualifier ====
First round
(United States) Asia Muhammad	3	4
WC	(United States) Alexandra Stevenson	6	6
(United States) Raquel Kops-Jones	4	1
(United States) CoCo Vandeweghe	6	6
WC	(United States) Tori Kinard	4	6	5
7	(Canada) Gabriela Dabrowski	6	2	7

Second round
3	(Canada) Sharon Fichman	6	6^{4}	6
WC	(United States) Alexandra Stevenson	3	7^{7}	2
(United States) CoCo Vandeweghe	6	6
7	(Canada) Gabriela Dabrowski	4	1

Qualifying competition
3	(Canada) Sharon Fichman	4	3
(United States) CoCo Vandeweghe	6	6

==== Fourth qualifier ====
First round				Second round				Qualifying competition
				4	(Russia) Alla Kudryavtseva	6	6
(United States) Sachia Vickery	6	2	4		(Croatia) Ivana Lisjak	4	2
(Croatia) Ivana Lisjak	4	6	6					4	(Russia) Alla Kudryavtseva	6	7
(Croatia) Jelena Pandžić	5	2						6	(Australia) Sacha Jones	2	5
(United States) Allie Will	7	6			(United States) Allie Will	4	1
				6	(Australia) Sacha Jones	6	6
