= 2014 Aegon International – Women's doubles =

Women's doubles
- 2014 Aegon International

Final
- Champions: (Chinese Taipei) Chan Hao-ching (Chinese Taipei) Chan Yung-jan
- Runners-up: (Switzerland) Martina Hingis (Italy) Flavia Pennetta
- Score: 6–3, 5–7, [10–7]

Details
- Draw: 16
- Seeds: 4

Events
Singles	men	women
Doubles	men	women
← 2013 ·	Eastbourne International	· 2015 →

Nadia Petrova and Katarina Srebotnik were the defending champions, but Petrova chose not to participate. Srebotnik played alongside Květa Peschke, but lost in the semifinals to Martina Hingis and Flavia Pennetta.
Chan Hao-ching and Chan Yung-jan won the title, defeating Hingis and Pennetta in the final, 6–3, 5–7, [10–7].

== Seeds ==
1. (Italy) Sara Errani / (Italy) Roberta Vinci (semifinals)
2. (Czech Republic) Květa Peschke / (Slovenia) Katarina Srebotnik (semifinals)
3. (Zimbabwe) Cara Black / (India) Sania Mirza (quarterfinals)
4. (Russia) Ekaterina Makarova / (Russia) Elena Vesnina (first round)

== Draw ==
=== Key ===
- Q = Qualifier
- WC = Wild card
- LL = Lucky loser
- Alt = Alternate
- SE = Special exempt
- PR = Protected ranking
- ITF = ITF entry
- JE = Junior exempt
- w/o = Walkover
- r = Retired
- d = Defaulted
- SR = Special ranking

=== Draw ===
First round
1	(Italy) S Errani (Italy) R Vinci	7^{8}	0	[10]
WC	(Serbia) J Janković (Italy) F Schiavone	6^{6}	6	[6]
(Poland) A Rosolska (Spain) S Soler Espinosa	1	2
(Hungary) T Babos (Chinese Taipei) S-w Hsieh	6	6
3	(Zimbabwe) C Black (India) S Mirza	6	6
WC	(Germany) A Kerber (Czech Republic) P Kvitová	0	2
(Chinese Taipei) H-c Chan (Chinese Taipei) Y-j Chan	6	7^{7}
(United States) R Kops-Jones (United States) A Spears	1	6^{5}
(Germany) J Görges (Germany) A-L Grönefeld	3	7	[6]
(United States) L Huber (United States) L Raymond	6	5	[10]
(Switzerland) M Hingis (Italy) F Pennetta	7	6
4	(Russia) E Makarova (Russia) E Vesnina	5	2
(Russia) A Pavlyuchenkova (Czech Republic) L Šafářová	6	4	[8]
(Japan) S Aoyama (Romania) M Niculescu	3	6	[10]
WC	(United Kingdom) J Rae (United Kingdom) A Smith	2	6	[4]
2	(Czech Republic) K Peschke (Slovenia) K Srebotnik	6	4	[10]

Quarterfinals
1	(Italy) S Errani (Italy) R Vinci	6	6
(Hungary) T Babos (Chinese Taipei) S-w Hsieh	2	4
3	(Zimbabwe) C Black (India) S Mirza	1	6	[7]
(Chinese Taipei) H-c Chan (Chinese Taipei) Y-j Chan	6	3	[10]
(United States) L Huber (United States) L Raymond	1	3
(Switzerland) M Hingis (Italy) F Pennetta	6	6
(Japan) S Aoyama (Romania) M Niculescu	2	3
2	(Czech Republic) K Peschke (Slovenia) K Srebotnik	6	6

Semifinals
1	(Italy) S Errani (Italy) R Vinci	2	3
(Chinese Taipei) H-c Chan (Chinese Taipei) Y-j Chan	6	6
(Switzerland) M Hingis (Italy) F Pennetta	6	4	[10]
2	(Czech Republic) K Peschke (Slovenia) K Srebotnik	4	6	[8]

Final
(Chinese Taipei) H-c Chan (Chinese Taipei) Y-j Chan	6	5	[10]
(Switzerland) M Hingis (Italy) F Pennetta	3	7	[7]
