= 2013 Bank of the West Classic – Doubles =

Doubles
- 2013 Bank of the West Classic

Final
- Champions: (United States) Raquel Kops-Jones (United States) Abigail Spears
- Runners-up: (Germany) Julia Görges (Croatia) Darija Jurak
- Score: 6–2, 7–6^{(7–4)}

Details
- Draw: 16
- Seeds: 4

Events
Singles	Doubles
← 2012 ·	Bank of the West Classic	· 2014 →

Marina Erakovic and Heather Watson were the defending champions but decided not to participate.
Raquel Kops-Jones and Abigail Spears won the title, defeating Julia Görges and Darija Jurak in the final, 6-2, 7–6^{(7–4)}.

== Seeds ==
1. (United States) Raquel Kops-Jones / (United States) Abigail Spears (champions)
2. (Germany) Julia Görges / (Croatia) Darija Jurak (final)
3. (Slovakia) Daniela Hantuchová / (United States) Lisa Raymond (semifinals)
4. (Chinese Taipei) Chan Hao-ching / (Russia) Vera Dushevina (semifinals)

== Draw ==
=== Key ===
- Q = Qualifier
- WC = Wild card
- LL = Lucky loser
- Alt = Alternate
- SE = Special exempt
- PR = Protected ranking
- ITF = ITF entry
- JE = Junior exempt
- w/o = Walkover
- r = Retired
- d = Defaulted
- SR = Special ranking

=== Draw ===
First round
1	(United States) R Kops-Jones (United States) A Spears	4	6	[10]
(United States) C McHale (Austria) T Paszek	6	3	[8]
(Spain) N Llagostera Vives (Italy) F Schiavone
(United States) J Cako (United States) N Pluskota	w/o
3	(Slovakia) D Hantuchová (United States) L Raymond	2	6	[10]
(United States) M Burdette (Romania) S Cîrstea	6	3	[8]
WC	(United States) N Gibbs (United States) C Vandeweghe	5	3
(United States) A Muhammad (United States) A Will	7	6
(Belarus) O Govortsova (Russia) A Kudryavtseva	6	6
(Japan) M Miyamura (Russia) O Puchkova	3	1
(Canada) G Dabrowski (Canada) S Fichman	4	0
4	(Chinese Taipei) H-c Chan (Russia) V Dushevina	6	6
(United States) V Lepchenko (Croatia) A Tomljanović	6	5	[6]
(South Africa) N Grandin (Poland) A Rosolska	4	7	[10]
(Slovakia) D Cibulková (Romania) M Niculescu	6	4	[8]
2	(Germany) J Görges (Croatia) D Jurak	4	6	[10]

Quarterfinals
1	(United States) R Kops-Jones (United States) A Spears	6	6
(United States) J Cako (United States) N Pluskota	3	2
3	(Slovakia) D Hantuchová (United States) L Raymond	6	5	[14]
(United States) A Muhammad (United States) A Will	3	7	[12]
(Belarus) O Govortsova (Russia) A Kudryavtseva	6	3	[5]
4	(Chinese Taipei) H-c Chan (Russia) V Dushevina	1	6	[10]
(South Africa) N Grandin (Poland) A Rosolska	6	2	[5]
2	(Germany) J Görges (Croatia) D Jurak	0	6	[10]

Semifinals
1	(United States) R Kops-Jones (United States) A Spears	7	6
3	(Slovakia) D Hantuchová (United States) L Raymond	5	2
4	(Chinese Taipei) H-c Chan (Russia) V Dushevina	4	4
2	(Germany) J Görges (Croatia) D Jurak	6	6

Final
1	(United States) R Kops-Jones (United States) A Spears	6	7^{7}
2	(Germany) J Görges (Croatia) D Jurak	2	6^{4}
