= 2014 Bank of the West Classic – Doubles =

Tennis Tournament

Doubles
- 2014 Bank of the West Classic

Final
- Champions: (Spain) Garbiñe Muguruza (Spain) Carla Suárez Navarro
- Runners-up: (Poland) Paula Kania (Czech Republic) Kateřina Siniaková
- Score: 6–2, 4–6, [10–5]

Details
- Draw: 15
- Seeds: 4

Events
Singles	Doubles
← 2013 ·	Bank of the West Classic	· 2015 →

Raquel Kops-Jones and Abigail Spears were the defending champions, but they lost to Paula Kania and Kateřina Siniaková in the semifinals.
Garbiñe Muguruza and Carla Suárez Navarro won the title, defeating Kania and Siniaková in the final, 6–2, 4–6, [10–5].

== Seeds ==
1. (United States) Raquel Kops-Jones / (United States) Abigail Spears (semifinals)
2. (Russia) Alla Kudryavtseva / (Australia) Anastasia Rodionova (semifinals)
3. (Spain) Garbiñe Muguruza / (Spain) Carla Suárez Navarro (champions)
4. (Chinese Taipei) Chan Hao-ching / (Germany) Andrea Petkovic (first round)

== Draw ==
=== Key ===
- Q = Qualifier
- WC = Wild card
- LL = Lucky loser
- Alt = Alternate
- SE = Special exempt
- PR = Protected ranking
- ITF = ITF entry
- JE = Junior exempt
- w/o = Walkover
- r = Retired
- d = Defaulted
- SR = Special ranking

=== Draw ===
First round
(Japan) M Osaka (Russia) M Shamayko	1	0
(United States) V Lepchenko (Croatia) A Tomljanović	6	6
4	(Chinese Taipei) H-c Chan (Germany) A Petkovic	2	6	[8]
(Poland) P Kania (Czech Republic) K Siniaková	6	3	[10]
(Slovakia) D Hantuchová (Spain) A Parra Santonja	3	7^{7}	[10]
(Russia) D Gavrilova (China) Y Xu	6	6^{2}	[8]
(France) C Garcia (China) S Zhang	3	6	[12]
(United States) K Ahn (Canada) C Zhao	6	1	[10]
(Czech Republic) E Hrdinová (Slovenia) A Klepač	4	2
3	(Spain) G Muguruza (Spain) C Suárez Navarro	6	6
(Croatia) M Lučić-Baroni (Czech Republic) Ka Plíšková	4	6	[10]
(Croatia) D Jurak (United States) M Moulton-Levy	6	4	[7]
(Argentina) P Ormaechea (Canada) A Wozniak
2	(Russia) A Kudryavtseva (Australia) A Rodionova	w/o

Quarterfinals
1	(United States) R Kops-Jones (United States) A Spears	7^{8}	6
(United States) V Lepchenko (Croatia) A Tomljanović	6^{6}	1
(Poland) P Kania (Czech Republic) K Siniaková	7^{7}	6
(Slovakia) D Hantuchová (Spain) A Parra Santonja	6^{3}	4
(France) C Garcia (China) S Zhang	0	5
3	(Spain) G Muguruza (Spain) C Suárez Navarro	6	7
(Croatia) M Lučić-Baroni (Czech Republic) Ka Plíšková	1	0
2	(Russia) A Kudryavtseva (Australia) A Rodionova	6	6

Semifinals
1	(United States) R Kops-Jones (United States) A Spears	7^{7}	3	[10]
(Poland) P Kania (Czech Republic) K Siniaková	6^{3}	6	[12]
3	(Spain) G Muguruza (Spain) C Suárez Navarro	5	7^{7}	[10]
2	(Russia) A Kudryavtseva (Australia) A Rodionova	7	6^{2}	[8]

Final
(Poland) P Kania (Czech Republic) K Siniaková	2	6	[5]
3	(Spain) G Muguruza (Spain) C Suárez Navarro	6	4	[10]
