= 2014 Aegon International – Women's singles =

Women's singles
- 2014 Aegon International

Final
- Champion: (United States) Madison Keys
- Runner-up: (Germany) Angelique Kerber
- Score: 6–3, 3–6, 7–5

Events
Singles	men	women
Doubles	men	women
← 2013 ·	Aegon International	· 2015 →

Elena Vesnina was the defending champion, but lost in the second round to Madison Keys.

Keys went on to win her maiden WTA tour title, defeating Angelique Kerber in the final, 6–3, 3–6, 7–5.

== Seeds ==
1. (Poland) Agnieszka Radwańska (first round)
2. (Czech Republic) Petra Kvitová (quarterfinals, withdrew because of a hamstring injury)
3. (Serbia) Jelena Janković (first round)
4. (Belarus) Victoria Azarenka (first round)
5. (Germany) Angelique Kerber (final)
6. (Italy) Flavia Pennetta (second round)
7. (Italy) Sara Errani (first round)
8. (Denmark) Caroline Wozniacki (semifinals)

== Draw ==
=== Key ===
- Q = Qualifier
- WC = Wild card
- LL = Lucky loser
- Alt = Alternate
- ITF = ITF entry
- PR = Protected ranking
- SR = Special ranking
- SE = Special exempt
- JE = Junior exempt
- JR = Junior Accelerator Programme entrant
- CO = College Accelerator Programme entrant
- NG = Next Gen Accelerator Program entrant
- w/o = Walkover
- r = Retired
- d = Defaulted

=== Finals ===
Semifinals
5	(Germany) Angelique Kerber	3	7^{7}	6
8	(Denmark) Caroline Wozniacki	6	6^{3}	3
(United States) Madison Keys	6	6
WC	(United Kingdom) Heather Watson	3	1

Final
5	(Germany) Angelique Kerber	3	6	5
(United States) Madison Keys	6	3	7

=== Top half ===
First round
1	(Poland) A Radwańska	4	6	6^{4}
(Russia) A Pavlyuchenkova	6	3	7^{7}
Q	(Italy) F Schiavone	5	3
(Russia) E Makarova	7	6
(France) A Cornet	6	6
(Serbia) B Jovanovski	3	2
(United States) A Riske	6^{6}	4
5	(Germany) A Kerber	7^{8}	6
4/WC	(Belarus) V Azarenka	6	3	5
(Italy) C Giorgi	4	6	7
WC	(United Kingdom) J Konta	6	6
Q	(Switzerland) B Bencic	3	2
(France) C Garcia	2	4
(United States) S Stephens	6	6
(Australia) S Stosur	5	4
8	(Denmark) C Wozniacki	7	6

Second round
(Russia) A Pavlyuchenkova	3	3
(Russia) E Makarova	6	6
(France) A Cornet	5	6	6^{3}
5	(Germany) A Kerber	7	1	7^{7}
(Italy) C Giorgi	1	7	7
WC	(United Kingdom) J Konta	6	5	5
(United States) S Stephens	3	3
8	(Denmark) C Wozniacki	6	6

Quarterfinals
(Russia) E Makarova	2	1
5	(Germany) A Kerber	6	6
(Italy) C Giorgi	7^{9}	4	2
8	(Denmark) C Wozniacki	6^{7}	6	6

Semifinals
5	(Germany) A Kerber	3	7^{7}	6
8	(Denmark) C Wozniacki	6	6^{3}	3

=== Bottom half ===
First round
7	(Italy) S Errani	6^{5}	2
Q	(United States) L Davis	7^{7}	6
(Slovakia) D Hantuchová	7	6
(Italy) R Vinci	5	1
(China) S Peng	3	4
(Russia) E Vesnina	6	6
(United States) M Keys	6	6
3	(Serbia) J Janković	3	3
6	(Italy) F Pennetta	6	6
Q	(Chinese Taipei) S-w Hsieh	3	3
WC	(United Kingdom) H Watson	3	7	6
(Bulgaria) T Pironkova	6	5	2
(China) S Zhang	7	4	1
(United States) V Lepchenko	5	6	6
(Czech Republic) L Šafářová	1	7	6^{4}
2	(Czech Republic) P Kvitová	6	5	7^{7}

Second round
Q	(United States) L Davis	6	6
(Slovakia) D Hantuchová	3	3
(Russia) E Vesnina	5	6^{9}
(United States) M Keys	7	7^{11}
6	(Italy) F Pennetta	7^{8}	4	2
WC	(United Kingdom) H Watson	6^{6}	6	6
(United States) V Lepchenko	1	4
2	(Czech Republic) P Kvitová	6	6

Quarterfinals
Q	(United States) L Davis	2	1
(United States) M Keys	6	6
WC	(United Kingdom) H Watson	w/o
2	(Czech Republic) P Kvitová

Semifinals
(United States) M Keys	6	6
WC	(United Kingdom) H Watson	3	1

== Qualifying ==
=== Seeds ===
1. (Czech Republic) Karolína Plíšková (qualifying competition)
2. (United States) Christina McHale (second round)
3. (Croatia) Ajla Tomljanović (qualifying competition)
4. (Slovakia) Anna Schmiedlová (second round)
5. (United States) Lauren Davis (qualified)
6. (Croatia) Donna Vekić (withdrew)
7. (Italy) Francesca Schiavone (qualified)
8. (Spain) Sílvia Soler Espinosa (second round)

=== Qualifiers ===
1. (United States) Lauren Davis
2. (Chinese Taipei) Hsieh Su-wei
3. (Italy) Francesca Schiavone
4. (Switzerland) Belinda Bencic

=== Draw ===
==== First qualifier ====
First round
1	(Czech Republic) Karolína Plíšková	7	6^{5}	6
(Brazil) Teliana Pereira	5	7^{7}	3
(Serbia) Vesna Dolonc	1	3
(Switzerland) Stefanie Vögele	6	6
(Croatia) Mirjana Lučić-Baroni	6	5	0^{r}
(Sweden) Johanna Larsson	3	7	0
WC	(United Kingdom) Tara Moore	0	2
5	(United States) Lauren Davis	6	6

Second round
1	(Czech Republic) Karolína Plíšková	6	6^{3}	6
(Switzerland) Stefanie Vögele	4	7^{7}	3
(Sweden) Johanna Larsson	6	4	4
5	(United States) Lauren Davis	2	6	6

Qualifying competition
1	(Czech Republic) Karolína Plíšková	6	6^{5}	4
5	(United States) Lauren Davis	4	7^{7}	6

==== Second qualifier ====
First round
2	(United States) Christina McHale	6	6
WC	(United Kingdom) Samantha Murray	1	3
(Serbia) Jovana Jakšić	2	4
(Chinese Taipei) Hsieh Su-wei	6	6
WC	(United Kingdom) Katie Boulter	3	1
(Austria) Tamira Paszek	6	6
(United States) Anna Tatishvili	4	7^{10}	6
Alt	(Ukraine) Anastasiya Vasylyeva	6	6^{8}	2

Second round
2	(United States) Christina McHale	6	4	6^{6}
(Chinese Taipei) Hsieh Su-wei	2	6	7^{8}
(Austria) Tamira Paszek	4	6	6
(United States) Anna Tatishvili	6	4	1

Qualifying competition
(Chinese Taipei) Hsieh Su-wei	6	7
(Austria) Tamira Paszek	3	5

==== Third qualifier ====
First round
3	(Croatia) Ajla Tomljanović	6	6
WC	(United Kingdom) Jade Windley	2	1
(Argentina) Paula Ormaechea	7^{7}	6
(France) Virginie Razzano	6^{5}	4
(Slovenia) Tadeja Majerič	1	4
(Ukraine) Yuliya Beygelzimer	6	6
(Japan) Misaki Doi	4	3
7	(Italy) Francesca Schiavone	6	6

Second round
3	(Croatia) Ajla Tomljanović	4	6	6
(Argentina) Paula Ormaechea	6	1	2
(Ukraine) Yuliya Beygelzimer	3	3
7	(Italy) Francesca Schiavone	6	6

Qualifying competition
3	(Croatia) Ajla Tomljanović	7^{7}	0	6^{2}
7	(Italy) Francesca Schiavone	6^{2}	6	7^{7}

==== Fourth qualifier ====
First round
4	(Slovakia) Anna Schmiedlová	6	6
(Poland) Katarzyna Piter	3	3
(Switzerland) Belinda Bencic	7^{7}	6
(United Kingdom) Naomi Broady	6^{2}	3
(Thailand) Luksika Kumkhum	6	6
(Romania) Alexandra Cadanțu	4	4
(Poland) Paula Kania	2	3
8	(Spain) Sílvia Soler Espinosa	6	6

Second round
4	(Slovakia) Anna Schmiedlová	3	2
(Switzerland) Belinda Bencic	6	6
(Thailand) Luksika Kumkhum	6	6
8	(Spain) Sílvia Soler Espinosa	3	1

Qualifying competition
(Switzerland) Belinda Bencic	6	6
(Thailand) Luksika Kumkhum	0	2
