= 2014 Bank of the West Classic =

- Date: 28 July – 3 August
- Edition: 43rd
- Category: WTA Premier
- Surface: Hard
- Location: Stanford, United States

Champions

Singles
- (United States) Serena Williams

Doubles
- (Spain) Garbiñe Muguruza (Spain) Carla Suárez Navarro
- Stanford Classic

The 2014 Bank of the West Classic was a professional tennis tournament played on hard courts. It was the 43rd edition of the tournament, which was part of the WTA Premier tournaments of the 2014 WTA Tour. It took place in Stanford, United States between 28 July and 3 August 2014. It was the first women's event on the 2014 US Open Series.

== Points and prize money ==
=== Point distribution ===
Event	W	F	SF	QF	Round of 16	Round of 32	Round of 64	Q	Q2	Q1
Women's singles	470	305	185	100	55	30	1	25	13	1
Women's doubles	470	305	185	100	1	—N/a	—N/a	—N/a	—N/a	—N/a

=== Prize money ===
The total commitment prize money for this year's event was $710,000

Event	W	F	SF	QF	Round of 16	Round of 32	Q2	Q1
Women's singles	$120,000	$64,000	$35,000	$20,000	$10,000	$6,550	$3,025	$1,690
Women's doubles	$38,000	$20,000	$11,000	$5,600	$3,035	—N/a	—N/a	—N/a

== Singles main-draw entrants ==
=== Seeds ===
Country	Player	Rank^{1}	Seed
USA	Serena Williams	1	1
POL	Agnieszka Radwańska	5	2
GER	Angelique Kerber	8	3
BLR	Victoria Azarenka	10	4
SRB	Ana Ivanovic	11	5
SVK	Dominika Cibulková	12	6
ESP	Carla Suárez Navarro	16	7
GER	Andrea Petkovic	18	8

- ^{1} Rankings are as of July 21, 2014

=== Other entrants ===
The following players received wildcards into the singles main draw:

- (United States) Kristie Ahn
- (Belarus) Victoria Azarenka
- (United States) Venus Williams

The following players received entry from the qualifying draw:

- (Poland) Paula Kania
- (Japan) Naomi Osaka
- (United States) Sachia Vickery
- (Canada) Carol Zhao

=== Withdrawals ===
Before the tournament

- (Italy) Sara Errani, replaced by CoCo Vandeweghe
- (Czech Republic) Petra Kvitová, replaced by Kimiko Date-Krumm

=== Retirements ===
- (Belgium) Yanina Wickmayer (viral illness)

== Doubles main-draw entrants ==
=== Seeds ===
Country	Player	Country	Player	Rank^{1}	Seed
USA	Raquel Kops-Jones	USA	Abigail Spears	26	1
RUS	Alla Kudryavtseva	AUS	Anastasia Rodionova	40	2
ESP	Garbiñe Muguruza	ESP	Carla Suárez Navarro	67	3
TPE	Chan Hao-ching	GER	Andrea Petkovic	69	4

- ^{1} Rankings are as of July 21, 2014

=== Withdrawals ===
During the tournament

- (Canada) Aleksandra Wozniak (viral illness)

== Finals ==
=== Singles ===
- (United States) Serena Williams defeated (Germany) Angelique Kerber, 7–6^{(7–1)}, 6–3

=== Doubles ===
- (Spain) Garbiñe Muguruza / (Spain) Carla Suárez Navarro defeated (Poland) Paula Kania / (Czech Republic) Kateřina Siniaková, 6–2, 4–6, [10–5]
