= 2014 Aegon International – Men's singles =

Men's singles
- 2014 Aegon International

Final
- Champion: (Spain) Feliciano López
- Runner-up: (France) Richard Gasquet
- Score: 6–3, 6–7^{(5–7)}, 7–5

Events
Singles	men	women
Doubles	men	women
- Aegon International

Feliciano López was the reigning champion and successfully defended the title, defeating Richard Gasquet in the final, 6–3, 6–7^{(5–7)}, 7–5.

== Seeds ==
The top four seeds receive a bye into the second round.

1. (France) Richard Gasquet (final)
2. (Ukraine) Alexandr Dolgopolov (withdrew)
3. (Spain) Feliciano López (champion)
4. (Spain) Guillermo García-López (second round)
5. (Croatia) Ivo Karlović (first round)
6. (France) Gilles Simon (second round)
7. (Colombia) Santiago Giraldo (first round)
8. (Argentina) Federico Delbonis (first round)

== Draw ==
Key

- Q = Qualifier
- WC = Wild card
- LL = Lucky loser
- Alt = Alternate
- ITF = ITF entry
- PR = Protected ranking
- SR = Special ranking
- SE = Special exempt
- JE = Junior exempt
- JR = Junior Accelerator Programme entrant
- CO = College Accelerator Programme entrant
- NG = Next Gen Accelerator Program entrant
- w/o = Walkover
- r = Retired
- d = Defaulted

=== Finals ===
Semifinals
1	(France) Richard Gasquet	6	6
(Uzbekistan) Denis Istomin	4	2
3	(Spain) Feliciano López	6	7^{7}
(United States) Sam Querrey	4	6^{4}

Final
1	(France) Richard Gasquet	3	7^{7}	5
3	(Spain) Feliciano López	6	6^{5}	7

=== Top half ===
First round
(Kazakhstan) A Golubev	4	4
(Australia) B Tomic	6	6
(United States) D Young	6	6
WC	(United Kingdom) J Ward	3	2
(Slovakia) M Kližan	6	6
8	(Argentina) F Delbonis	4	4
(Uzbekistan) D Istomin	7^{8}	6^{7}	6
(Kazakhstan) M Kukushkin	6^{6}	7^{9}	3
(France) É Roger-Vasselin	6	6
Q	(Russia) A Kuznetsov	3	4
(Finland) J Nieminen	6	6^{5}	6
7	(Colombia) S Giraldo	3	7^{7}	3

Second round
1	(France) R Gasquet	6	3	6
(Australia) B Tomic	4	6	3
(United States) D Young	6^{4}	4
(Slovakia) M Kližan	7^{7}	6
4	(Spain) G García-López	2	5
(Uzbekistan) D Istomin	6	7
(France) É Roger-Vasselin	6	7^{7}
(Finland) J Nieminen	2	6^{4}

Quarterfinals
1	(France) R Gasquet	6	6
(Slovakia) M Kližan	3	4
(Uzbekistan) D Istomin	7^{7}	6
(France) É Roger-Vasselin	6^{5}	2

Semifinals
1	(France) R Gasquet	6	6
(Uzbekistan) D Istomin	4	2

=== Bottom half ===
First round
5	(Croatia) I Karlović	4	4
(France) J Chardy	6	6
(Argentina) C Berlocq	6	3
Q	(Slovenia) B Rola	2	1^{r}
WC	(United Kingdom) D Evans	2	3
Q	(Germany) T Kamke	6	6
6	(France) G Simon	7^{7}	6
Q	(Australia) C Guccione	6^{2}	4
(France) J Benneteau	6	6
(Chinese Taipei) Y-h Lu	2	4
(United States) S Querrey	7^{7}	6
WC	(United Kingdom) K Edmund	6^{5}	3

Second round
(France) J Chardy	6	7
(Argentina) C Berlocq	4	5
Q	(Germany) T Kamke	6^{10}	5
3	(Spain) F López	7^{12}	7
6	(France) G Simon	3	4
(France) J Benneteau	6	6
(United States) S Querrey	7	0
LL	(Dominican Republic) V Estrella Burgos	5	0^{r}

Quarterfinals
(France) J Chardy	3	4
3	(Spain) F López	6	6
(France) J Benneteau	6^{5}	4
(United States) S Querrey	7^{7}	6

Semifinals
3	(Spain) F López	6	7^{7}
(United States) S Querrey	4	6^{4}

== Qualifying ==
=== Seeds ===
The top four seeds receive a bye into the second round.

1. (Germany) Tobias Kamke (qualified)
2. (Slovenia) Blaž Rola (qualified)
3. (Dominican Republic) Víctor Estrella Burgos (qualifying competition, Lucky loser)
4. (United States) Michael Russell (second round, retired)
5. (Belgium) David Goffin (qualifying competition)
6. (Russia) Andrey Kuznetsov (qualified)
7. (Poland) Michał Przysiężny (second round)
8. (India) Somdev Devvarman (second round)

=== Qualifiers ===
1. (Germany) Tobias Kamke
2. (Slovenia) Blaž Rola
3. (Russia) Andrey Kuznetsov
4. (Australia) Chris Guccione

=== Lucky losers ===
1. (Dominican Republic) Víctor Estrella Burgos

=== Qualifying draw ===
==== First qualifier ====
First round
(France) Rémi Boutillier	6	7^{7}
(United Kingdom) Ken Skupski	3	6^{3}
(United Kingdom) Keelan Oakley	5	6	3
(United Kingdom) Jathan Malik	7	4	6
(Austria) Philipp Oswald	4	2
5	(Belgium) David Goffin	6	6

Second round
1	(Germany) Tobias Kamke	6	3	6
(France) Rémi Boutillier	4	6	3
(United Kingdom) Jathan Malik	2	4
5	(Belgium) David Goffin	6	6

Qualifying competition
1	(Germany) Tobias Kamke	6	6
5	(Belgium) David Goffin	1	4

==== Second qualifier ====
First round
(Colombia) Juan Sebastián Cabal	6	7
(Zimbabwe) Takanyi Garanganga	2	5
(United Kingdom) Joe Salisbury	5	7^{7}	4
(United Kingdom) Daniel Smethurst	7	6^{2}	6
(New Zealand) Marcus Daniell	3	6	3
8	(India) Somdev Devvarman	6	3	6

Second round
2	(Slovenia) Blaž Rola	6	6
(Colombia) Juan Sebastián Cabal	1	4
(United Kingdom) Daniel Smethurst	6	7^{8}
8	(India) Somdev Devvarman	4	6^{6}

Qualifying competition
2	(Slovenia) Blaž Rola	6	7^{7}
(United Kingdom) Daniel Smethurst	3	6^{4}

==== Third qualifier ====
First round
(India) Divij Sharan	6^{4}	1
WC	(United Kingdom) James Marsalek	7^{7}	6
(United Kingdom) Richard Gabb	5	7	7
(United Kingdom) Neil Pauffley	7	5	5
(Uzbekistan) Farrukh Dustov	2	7	5
6	(Russia) Andrey Kuznetsov	6	5	7

Second round
3	(Dominican Republic) Víctor Estrella Burgos	1	6	7^{7}
WC	(United Kingdom) James Marsalek	6	3	6^{5}
(United Kingdom) Richard Gabb	3	0
6	(Russia) Andrey Kuznetsov	6	6

Qualifying competition
3	(Dominican Republic) Víctor Estrella Burgos	7^{12}	3	1
6	(Russia) Andrey Kuznetsov	6^{10}	6	6

==== Fourth qualifier ====
First round
(United Kingdom) Daniel Cox	6	6
WC	(United Kingdom) Rhett Purcell	3	0
(Australia) Chris Guccione	6	6
(United Kingdom) Scott Clayton	2	1
(United Kingdom) Neal Skupski	2	1
7	(Poland) Michał Przysiężny	6	6

Second round
4	(United States) Michael Russell	0^{r}
(United Kingdom) Daniel Cox	3
(Australia) Chris Guccione	7^{7}	7^{9}
7	(Poland) Michał Przysiężny	6^{5}	6^{7}

Qualifying competition
(United Kingdom) Daniel Cox	3	7^{7}	6^{2}
(Australia) Chris Guccione	6	6^{5}	7^{7}
