= Garbiñe Muguruza =

Spanish former tennis player (born 1993)

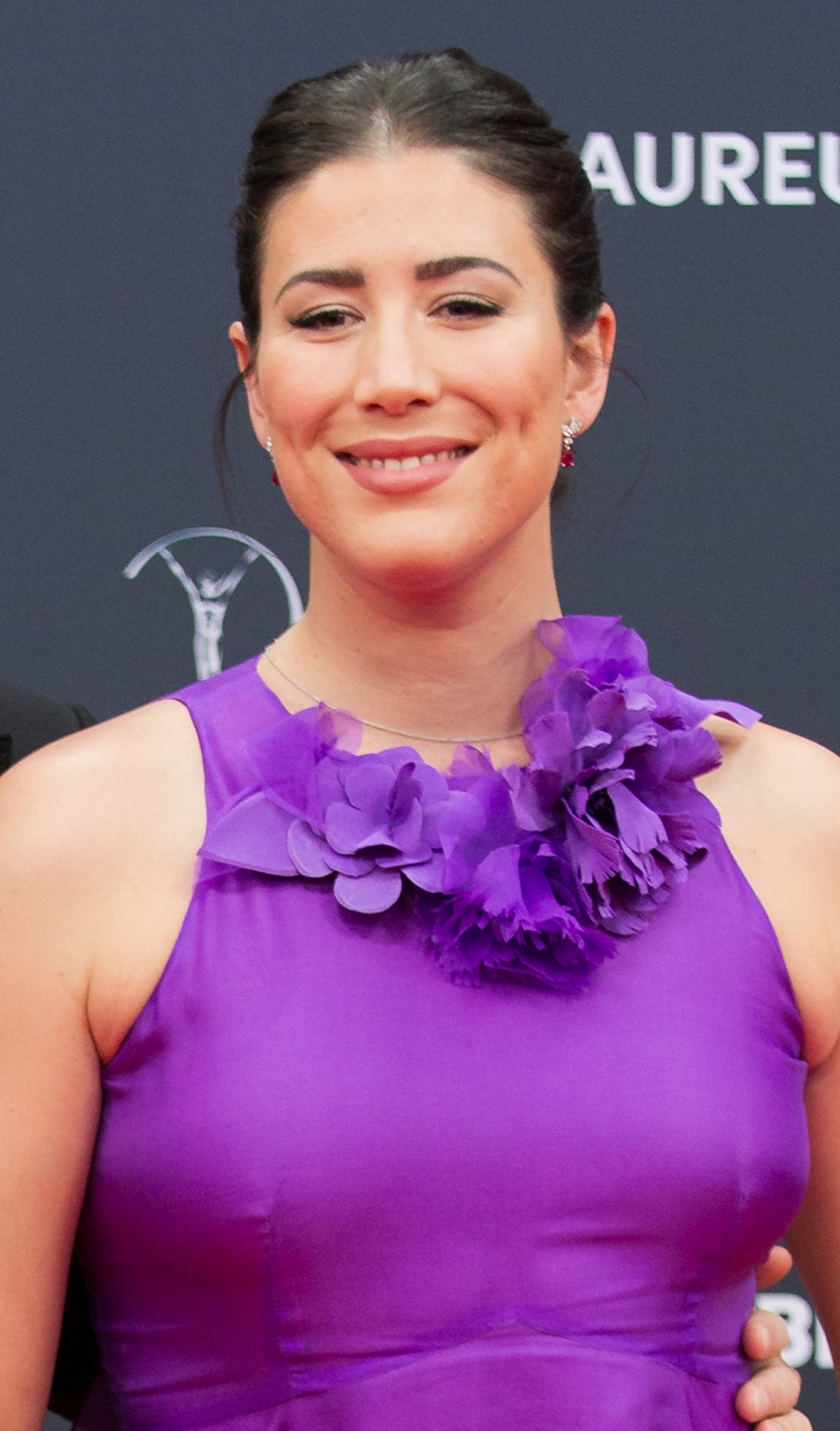
- Muguruza at the 25th Laureus World Sports Awards in 2024
- Country (sports): Spain
- Residence: Geneva, Switzerland
- Born: 8 October 1993 (age 33) Caracas, Venezuela
- Height: 1.82 m (6 ft 0 in)
- Turned pro: 2012
- Retired: 2024
- Plays: Right-handed (two-handed backhand)
- Coach: Conchita Martínez (2017–2018, 2020–2023)
- Prize money: $24,813,892: 18th all-time in earnings
- Official website: www.garbinemuguruza.com

Singles
- Career record: 449–238
- Career titles: 10
- Highest ranking: No. 1 (11 September 2017)

Grand Slam singles results
- Australian Open: F (2020)
- French Open: W (2016)
- Wimbledon: W (2017)
- US Open: 4R (2017, 2021)

Other tournaments
- Tour Finals: W (2021)
- Olympic Games: QF (2021)

Doubles
- Career record: 82–51
- Career titles: 5
- Highest ranking: No. 10 (23 February 2015)

Grand Slam doubles results
- Australian Open: 2R (2014, 2015)
- French Open: SF (2014)
- Wimbledon: 3R (2014)
- US Open: 3R (2014)

Other doubles tournaments
- Tour Finals: F (2015)
- Olympic Games: QF (2016)

Team competitions
- Fed Cup: 10–4
- Hopman Cup: RR (2019)

Garbiñe Muguruza Blanco (Spanish pronunciation: [ɡaɾˈβiɲe muɣuˈɾuθa ˈβlaŋko]; (Note: In isolation, Blanco is pronounced [ˈblaŋko].) born 8 October 1993) is a Venezuelan-born Spanish former professional tennis player. She was ranked as the world No. 1 in women's singles by the Women's Tennis Association (WTA), and world No. 10 in doubles. Muguruza won ten WTA Tour-level singles titles, including two majors at the 2016 French Open and the 2017 Wimbledon Championships, as well as the 2021 WTA Finals. She also finished runner-up at the 2015 Wimbledon Championships and the 2020 Australian Open.

With powerful groundstrokes and an aggressive style of play, Muguruza came to prominence at the 2012 Miami Open by reaching the fourth round defeating two top ten players. In 2015, Muguruza reached her first major final at Wimbledon, where she lost to Serena Williams. She then won her first Premier-level crown at the 2015 China Open, and qualified for her first WTA Finals in singles, losing to Agnieszka Radwańska in the semifinals. Muguruza then enjoyed the greatest achievements of her career in the following six years, winning the 2016 French Open and the 2017 Wimbledon Championships (defeating Serena and Venus Williams in the finals, respectively), reaching the world No. 1 singles ranking, reaching the 2020 Australian Open final, and winning the 2021 WTA Finals. Muguruza is the only person to beat both Williams sisters in a grand slam final. After playing her last professional singles match in January 2023, Muguruza formally retired from the sport in April 2024 at the age of 30.

Muguruza was also successful in doubles, winning five titles, finishing runner-up at the 2015 WTA Finals and reaching the 2014 French Open semifinals, always partnering her compatriot Carla Suárez Navarro.

== Early life ==
Garbiñe Muguruza was born in Caracas, Venezuela, on 8 October 1993 to her Venezuelan mother, Scarlet Blanco, and her Basque father José Antonio Muguruza, who hails from Azkoitia in Gipuzkoa, Basque Country. She has two elder brothers named Asier and Igor, also ex-professional tennis players, and has dual Spanish-Venezuelan citizenship. Muguruza began playing tennis at the age of three at the tennis courts of Mampote, in Guarenas outside Caracas, and already showed great talent and skill.

After moving to Spain with her family when she was six years old, looking for better prospects in her tennis development, Muguruza began training at the Bruguera Tennis Academy in Barcelona with her brothers, all dreaming of becoming professional tennis players.

== Tennis career ==
=== 2012-13: Early pro career ===
After turning professional on 2 March 2012, Muguruza was given a wild card for her first WTA Tour main-draw appearance at the Miami Open. There, she upset former world No. 2 Vera Zvonareva, and former world No. 10, Flavia Pennetta, before falling in the round of 16 to the eventual champion, Agnieszka Radwańska, in straight sets.

At the US Open, she qualified for the main draw of a Grand Slam tournament for the first time after a number of players withdrew; she lost in three sets to tenth seed Sara Errani in the first round.

At the Australian Open, Muguruza made it into the main draw, after several players withdrew; she lost to Serena Williams in straight sets in the second round.

At Indian Wells, she qualified for the main draw and then made her way to the last 16, where she fell to eventual semifinalist Angelique Kerber. She was then awarded a main-draw wild card into the Miami Open once more where she matched last year's result, recording wins over Kateřina Siniaková, 23rd seed Anastasia Pavlyuchenkova and ninth seed Caroline Wozniacki en route to the round of 16 where she lost to fifth seed Li Na.

After Wimbledon, Muguruza underwent a right ankle surgery and missed the rest of the season. She continued to train by hitting groundstrokes sitting down. She ended that year as the world No. 63 in singles and No. 153 in doubles.

=== 2014: First WTA Tour title, steady results & rise in doubles ===
Muguruza began the 2014 season with a quarterfinal appearance at the Auckland Open, where she lost to former world No. 1 and eventual runner-up, Venus Williams. The following week, Muguruza qualified and eventually won her first WTA singles title at the Hobart International by defeating Klára Zakopalová in the final in straight sets.

At the Australian Open, Muguruza recovered from a set down to defeat tenth seed Caroline Wozniacki in three sets to reach the fourth round for the first time where she lost in straight sets to the fifth seed, Agnieszka Radwańska. She and Arantxa Parra Santonja also reached the second round of the doubles event; they lost in straight sets to the eighth seeds, Raquel Kops-Jones and Abigail Spears.

After a three-set defeat to Kimiko Date-Krumm in the first round of the Thailand Open, Muguruza reached her second singles final of the year at the Brasil Tennis Cup, where she lost in three sets to Klára Zakopalová despite having led by a set and 5–2. Muguruza then lost in the second round at Indian Wells and Miami, after receiving opening-round byes, but did reach the quarterfinals of the latter event in doubles where she and her partner, Carla Suárez Navarro lost in three sets to the 8th seeds, Raquel Kops-Jones and Abigail Spears.

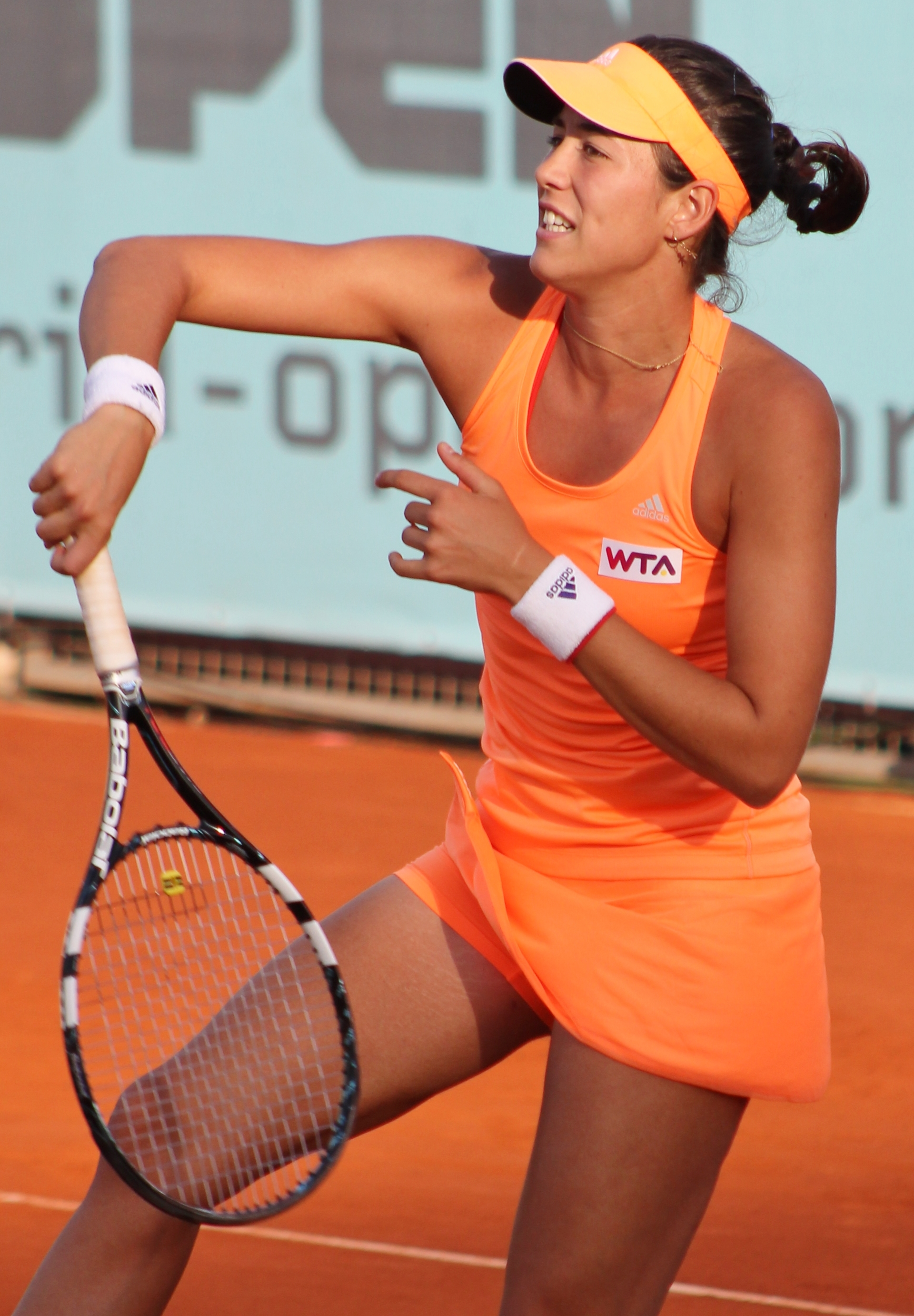
Muguruza and Carla Suárez Navarro reached the final of the 2014 Madrid Open, won the 2014 Stanford Classic and later qualified for the year-ending WTA Finals.

Muguruza recovered from her first-round defeat at the Monterrey Open by reaching the semifinals of the Marrakech Grand Prix where she lost to the eventual champion, María Teresa Torró Flor in straight sets. However, she and Romina Oprandi managed to win the doubles event by defeating Katarzyna Piter and Maryna Zanevska in the final in three sets. At the Madrid Open, Muguruza lost in the second round to former US Open champion, Samantha Stosur but reached the final of the doubles event with Carla Suárez Navarro where they lost in straight sets to the second seeded Italians, Sara Errani and Roberta Vinci.

After a second-round defeat to former French Open champion Francesca Schiavone at the Italian Open, Muguruza advanced to her first major quarterfinal at the French Open, having handed the world No. 1 and defending champion, Serena Williams, her worst defeat in a major tournament, losing only four games in the second round, before losing to the eventual champion, Maria Sharapova, in three sets. Muguruza also reached the semifinals of the doubles event with Suárez Navarro, where the pair lost in three sets to the top seeds and eventual champions, Peng Shuai and Hsieh Su-wei. As a result of her strong performances at the event, Muguruza achieved career-high singles and doubles rankings of world No. 27 and No. 36, respectively.

Muguruza began her grass-court season at the Rosmalen Championships where she reached the quarterfinals before losing to American qualifier CoCo Vandeweghe in straight sets, after leading 5–2 in the opening set. At the Wimbledon Championships, Muguruza was seeded 27th but was upset by Vandeweghe in the first round, in three sets. Seeded 16th in the doubles event with Suárez Navarro, Muguruza and her partner defeated Ajla Tomljanović and Christina McHale, and Monica Niculescu and Klára Koukalová to reach the third round where they lost in straight sets to Andrea Petkovic and Magdaléna Rybáriková.

Muguruza began the North American hardcourt season at the Stanford Classic. She defeated sixth seed and defending champion, Dominika Cibulková, in three sets and unseeded Daniela Hantuchová to reach the quarterfinals where she lost in straight sets to the third seed Angelique Kerber. Seeded third in the doubles event with Suárez Navarro, the pair defeated Eva Hrdinová and Andreja Klepač, Caroline Garcia and Zhang Shuai and the second seeds, Anastasia Rodionova and Alla Kudryavtseva, to reach the final where they defeated Paula Kania and Kateřina Siniaková in three sets to win the title. At the following week's Canadian Open, Muguruza overcame Canadian qualifier Stéphanie Dubois in the first round before falling in three sets to fourth seed Maria Sharapova. In the doubles event, Muguruza and Suárez Navarro progressed to the second round where they lost to the second seeds, Hsieh Su-wei and Peng Shuai. At the Cincinnati Open, Muguruza lost in the first round to German qualifier Annika Beck but reached the quarterfinals in doubles where she and Suárez Navarro lost to Kimiko Date-Krumm and Andrea Hlaváčková, in straight sets. At the Connecticut Open, Muguruza upset seventh seed Sara Errani before defeating qualifier Peng Shuai to reach the quarterfinals where she lost in three sets to unseeded Camila Giorgi. She and Suárez Navarro also lost to Marina Erakovic and Arantxa Parra Santonja in the first round of the doubles event. Muguruza's next event was the US Open, where she competed as the 25th seed. However, she was upset by resurgent qualifier, Mirjana Lučić-Baroni in the first round in straight sets. She and Suarez Navarro also reached the third round of the doubles event, defeating Alizé Cornet and Kirsten Flipkens and Marina Erakovic and Arantxa Parra Santonja en route before losing to the unseeded Williams sisters.

Muguruza began the Asian swing by competing at the Pan Pacific Open. She defeated Anastasia Pavlyuchenkova, fourth seed Jelena Janković and Casey Dellacqua en route to the semifinals where she fell in three sets to the second seed and eventual runner-up, Caroline Wozniacki. Muguruza also reached the final of the doubles event with Suárez Navarro, defeating Pavlyuchenkova and Lucie Šafářová, Jarmila Gajdošová and Arina Rodionova and the second seeds, Raquel Kops-Jones and Abigail Spears en route before losing to the top seeds, Cara Black and Sania Mirza in straight sets. Muguruza next competed at the inaugural edition of the Wuhan Open, where she reached the third round of the singles, defeating María Teresa Torró Flor and world No. 2, Simona Halep, en route and the second round of the doubles with Suárez Navarro after defeating Torró Flor and Sílvia Soler Espinosa in the first round but was ultimately forced to withdraw from the event due to gastritis. At the following week's China Open, Muguruza suffered a three-set first-round loss to Ekaterina Makarova but reached the quarterfinals of the doubles event with Suárez Navarro.

Muguruza's final event of the year was the season ending Tournament of Champions in Sofia, Bulgaria. Despite going undefeated in the round-robin stage with wins over top seed, Ekaterina Makarova, third seed Flavia Pennetta and sixth seed Alizé Cornet Muguruza fell to the eventual champion, Andrea Petkovic, in the semifinals in straight sets. She finished the year at career-high rankings of world No. 21 in singles and No. 16 in doubles.

=== 2015: Major final & top 10 in doubles, WTA Finals debut ===
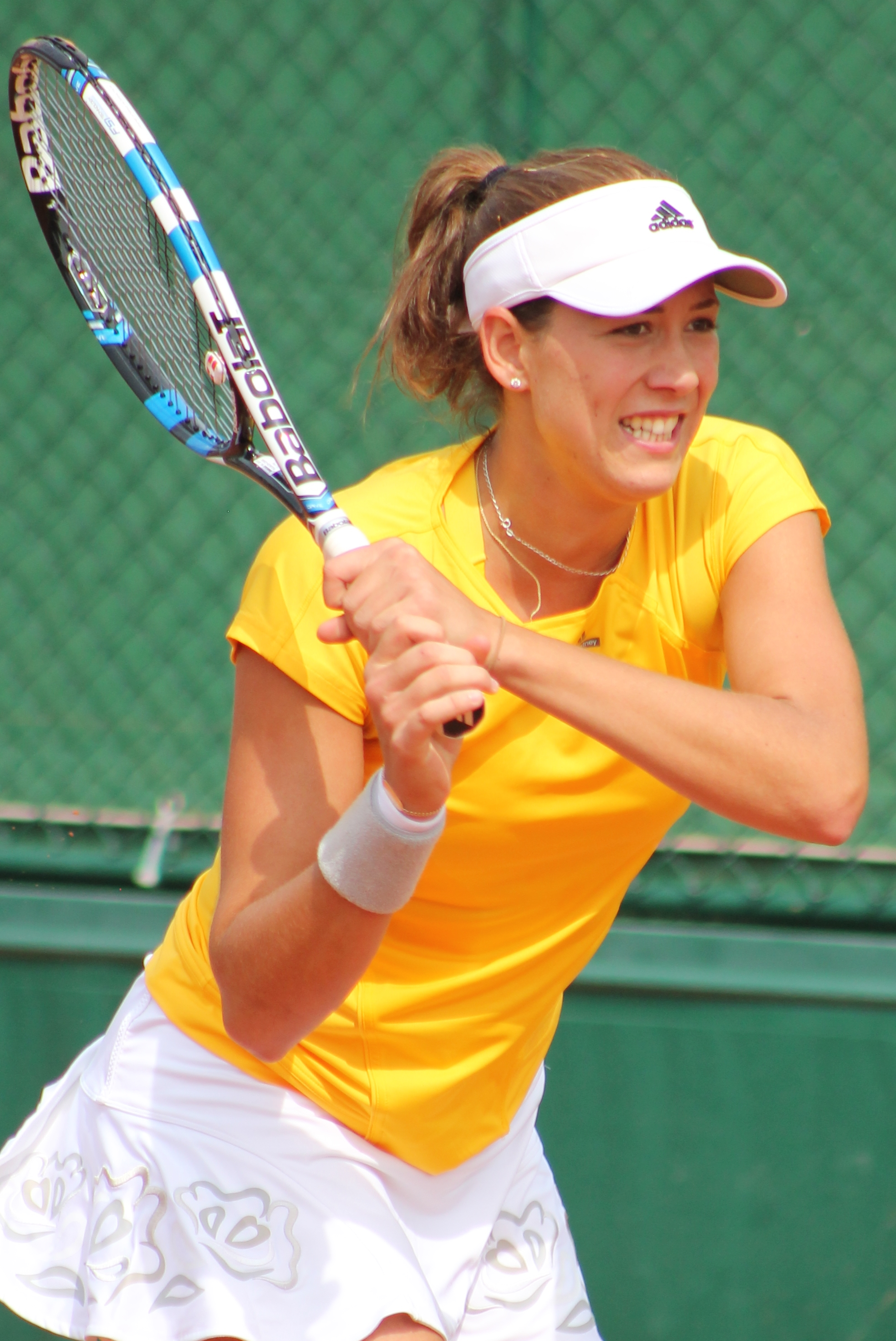
Muguruza reached her second major quarterfinal at the 2015 French Open

Muguruza's first event of the year was to be the Brisbane International but she was forced to withdraw from the event due to an ankle injury. The following week, Muguruza chose not to defend her title at the Hobart International and competed at the Sydney International instead, where she reached the quarterfinals, defeating Agnieszka Radwańska for the first time in her career en route. At the Australian Open, she progressed to the fourth round for the second consecutive year with wins over Marina Erakovic, Daniela Hantuchová and Timea Bacsinszky before falling to the eventual champion, Serena Williams, in three sets.

Muguruza won both of her singles rubbers in the 2015 Fed Cup World Group II, defeating Irina-Camelia Begu and world No. 3, Simona Halep, but Spain lost the tie 2–3 after Muguruza and her compatriot, Anabel Medina Garrigues, lost the deciding doubles rubber. At the Dubai Championships, Muguruza reached her first Premier-5 semifinal in singles, defeating qualifier Jarmila Gajdošová, 12th seed Jelena Janković, fifth seed Agnieszka Radwańska and 13th seed and doubles partner Suárez Navarro before falling to the 17th seed and eventual runner-up, Karolína Plíšková, in three sets. She also reached the final of the doubles with Suárez Navarro. The following week, Muguruza retired from her first-round match against Suárez Navarro at the Qatar Open while trailing 6–5 in the first set.

In March, she lost to Karolina Plíšková in the third round of the Indian Wells Open after a second-round win over American wildcard Irina Falconi. Despite this, she rose to a career-high singles ranking of 19 after the event. A fortnight later, Muguruza reached the third round of the Miami Open, after defeating qualifier Sesil Karatantcheva but lost to the 11th seed Sara Errani, after winning the first set.

Muguruza reached the second round of the three clay-court events that she competed in leading into the French Open. She lost to second seed Simona Halep in Stuttgart, Kristina Mladenovic in Marrakech and the eventual finalist Svetlana Kuznetsova in Madrid. Muguruza and Suárez Navarro also reached the doubles final of the latter for the second consecutive year but the pair lost in three sets to Casey Dellacqua and Yaroslava Shvedova. Despite failing to win back-to-back matches since February, Muguruza reached her second consecutive French Open quarterfinal, defeating Angelique Kerber and Flavia Pennetta en route, before losing to the eventual runner-up, Lucie Šafářová.

"For me if Muguruza doesn't win it this year, she's going to win this or another major at some point. She's not waiting, she's going and getting it, and that's the only way you can lift a major trophy."

— 2013 Wimbledon champion Marion Bartoli, on Muguruza after her semifinal win over Agnieszka Radwańska at the 2015 Wimbledon Championships

Muguruza made a poor start into the grass-court season, losing in the first round of the Birmingham Classic and the third round of the Eastbourne International after a first-round bye. However, she and Suárez Navarro won their first grass-court doubles title in Birmingham, defeating Andrea Hlaváčková and Lucie Hradecká in straight sets in the final. At the Wimbledon Championships, Muguruza defeated tenth seed Kerber in the third round, fifth seed Caroline Wozniacki in the fourth round, 15th seed Timea Bacsinszky in the quarterfinals and 13th seed Agnieszka Radwańska in the semifinals to advance to her maiden major final. She played against world No. 1, Serena Williams, for the title, but lost in straight sets. After the tournament, Muguruza entered the top 10 for the first time, moving up to world No. 9 in the rankings.

During the US Open Series, Muguruza did not enjoy much success, dropping her opening matches in Toronto and Cincinnati to qualifiers Lesia Tsurenko and Yaroslava Shvedova respectively. At the US Open, she recorded her first win at the tournament by defeating German Carina Witthöft in the first round. However, she fell short to Johanna Konta in the following round in three sets, the match was a total time of 3 hours and 23 minutes, the longest women's singles match in that tournament's history since the introduction of tiebreaker in 1970.

Muguruza kicked off the Asian swing at the Pan Pacific Open where she advanced to the last eight after defeating Barbora Strýcová before losing to eventual finalist Belinda Bencic, in straight sets. At the Wuhan Open, Muguruza cruised into her second straight quarterfinal at the event after dispatching Sloane Stephens and Ana Ivanovic. She then went on to defeat the likes of Anna Karolína Schmiedlová and Kerber to reach the final where she faced Venus Williams but was forced to retire in the second set with an ankle injury. Muguruza was able to crack the top 5 for the first time in her career after the tournament's conclusion. At the China Open, Muguruza breezed by Irina Falconi before going the distance against Mirjana Lučić-Baroni to advance to the quarterfinals. With the win, Muguruza qualified for the WTA Finals for the first time, becoming the first Spaniard to compete at the year-end championships since Arantxa Sánchez Vicario in 2001. She then beat Bethanie Mattek-Sands and Radwańska to advance to her maiden Premier Mandatory final. With her semifinal win over Radwańska, Muguruza reached a career high of world No. 4. She went on to defeat Bacsinszky in straight sets to claim her first Premier Mandatory title and her biggest title of her career.

Muguruza then traveled to Singapore for the 2015 WTA Finals, where she went undefeated in the round-robin play, beating Petra Kvitová, Angelique Kerber, and Lucie Šafářová. She then lost to eventual champion Agnieszka Radwańska in the semifinals. Muguruza also competed in doubles in Singapore, where she and Suárez Navarro reached the final. However, they lost to the No. 1 seeds, Martina Hingis and Sania Mirza.

=== 2016: French Open champion and world No. 2 ===
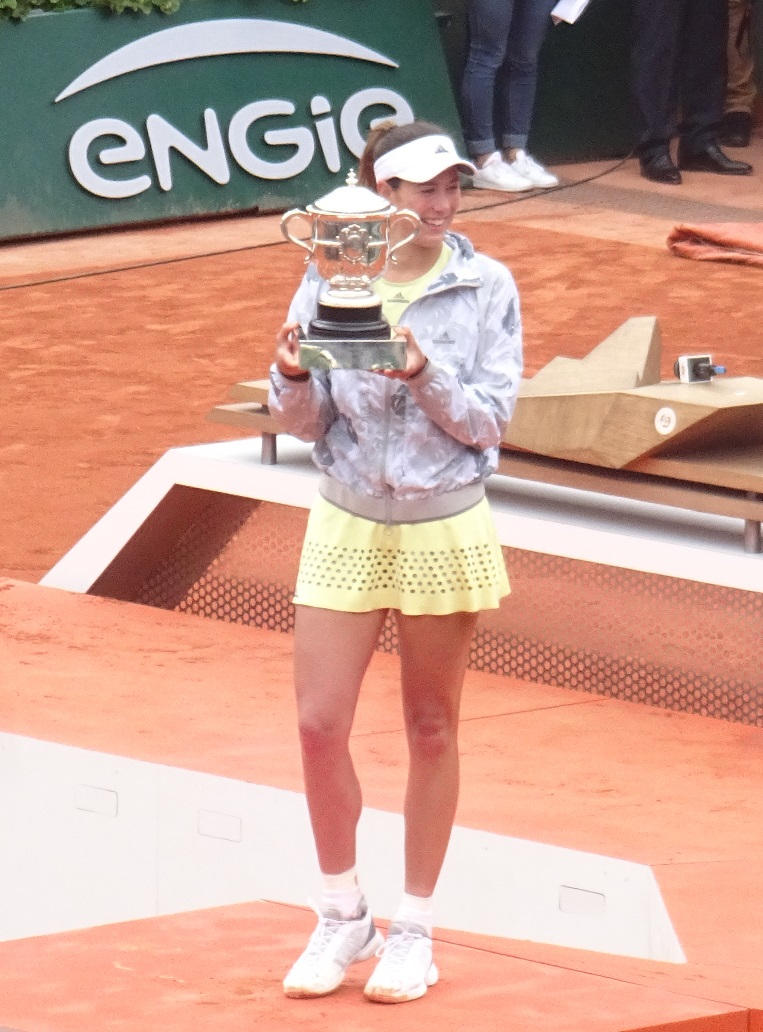
Muguruza holds her trophy after winning the 2016 French Open

Muguruza started her year at the Brisbane International, when she already had to retire in her first match of the tournament due to plantar fasciitis. Her next tournament was the Australian Open, where she ensured a spot in the third round with straight set wins over Anett Kontaveit and Kirsten Flipkens, but fell to Barbora Strýcová. At the Fed Cup, Muguruza helped in Spain's tie against Serbia with wins over Ivana Jorović and Jelena Janković.

At the Dubai Championships, Muguruza suffered another early loss as she fell to eventual semi-finalist Elina Svitolina. Her next tournament was the Qatar Ladies Open, where she reached first quarterfinal of the year, defeating Nao Hibino and Tímea Babos, but lost then to Andrea Petkovic in three sets. Next she played in Indian Wells Open, where she lost in her opening match against Christina McHale after receiving first round bye. At the Miami Open, she was close to being defeated in the opening match against Dominika Cibulková but survived in the final set. She reached the fourth round but lost to the Indian Wells and eventual champion Victoria Azarenka in two tiebreakers.

She kicked off the clay court season by participating the Fed Cup against Italy. She scored wins against Francesca Schiavone and No. 7, Roberta Vinci, to help Spain enter the World Group next year. She then played in Stuttgart Open. She reached her second quarterfinals of the season where she lost to Petra Kvitová. At the Madrid Open, she lost in the second round against Irina-Camelia Begu, despite serving for the match. She then went on to reach her first WTA semifinals of the season in Rome, after defeating top ten opponent Timea Bacsinszky in quarterfinals, but lost to Madison Keys in straight sets.

At the French Open, Muguruza turned her season around, unexpectedly capturing her first major title. She lost the first set against Anna Karolina Schmiedlová in her first-round match but won in three sets. After that, she easily reached her second major final without losing a set in the next five matches, including wins over former champion Svetlana Kuznetsova in the fourth round, surprise quarterfinalist Shelby Rogers, and former runner-up Sam Stosur in the semifinals. In the final, she faced world No. 1, Serena Williams, in a rematch of the previous year's Wimbledon final, and won in straight sets for her maiden major title. She marked 14 straight sets won, after losing the first she played. With the title she rose to a career high No. 2 in the WTA rankings of 6 June 2016. She is also the first Spanish female player to win a major title since Sánchez Vicario in 1998. By winning, Muguruza became the second player of either gender born in the 1990s to win a Major title after Petra Kvitová first did so at the 2011 Wimbledon Championships.

Starting off the grass-court season, she played the Mallorca Open, where she as the top seed suffered a first-round exit to former Wimbledon semifinalist Kirsten Flipkens, in straight sets, marking the third tournament of the year where she lost in her first match played and her second consecutive loss to Flipkens on grass. Muguruza returned to grass for Wimbledon as the second favorite with the chance to usurp the top ranking from Williams while being heralded as the leader of the next generation, following Williams' recent slump in tournament finals. Though Muguruza won her opening match against Camila Giorgi in a high quality display, she was quickly upset by Jana Čepelová in the second round. Unable to defend her finalist points from the previous year, Muguruza regressed to world No. 3 at the end of the tournament. At the Rio Olympic Games, Muguruza arrived as one of the favorite players to win in the women's singles tennis event. She defeated Andreea Mitu of Romania and Nao Hibino of Japan to progress to the third round. However, she was defeated comprehensively by the eventual gold medalist Monica Puig of Puerto Rico. She was also in the mixed doubles tournament alongside Rafael Nadal, but withdrew at the decision of Nadal, who was already playing both the men's singles and doubles.

Muguruza did not have much success during the US Open Series, either. At the US Open, she suffered another second-round loss, this time to Anastasija Sevastova. She did not fare well during the Asian Swing, with early round losses at the Pan Pacific Open in Tokyo, the Wuhan Open, and the China Open in Beijing. The loss in Beijing was significant, because Muguruza was the defending champion, and she therefore dropped in ranking after the tournament. However, she still qualified for the WTA Finals. Muguruza was defeated in the round robin stage, her only win coming from a three-set match against Svetlana Kuznetsova. She ended the season ranked No. 7.

=== 2017: Wimbledon crown and world No. 1 ===
Muguruza started the season at the Brisbane International, being the No. 4 seed. She made a run to the semifinals after three-set wins over Sam Stosur and Daria Kasatkina, and a straight sets win over Svetlana Kuznetsova. She then retired in the first set of her semifinal match against Alizé Cornet due to injury. At the Australian Open, Muguruza beat Marina Erakovic, Samantha Crawford, Anastasija Sevastova and Sorana Cîrstea en route to her first quarterfinal at the tournament. She then lost to CoCo Vandeweghe in straight sets.

Muguruza then played the Fed Cup quarterfinals, where she beat Barbora Strýcová in three sets before losing to Karolína Plíšková. Spain ended up losing the tie 2–3. During the Gulf Swing, she beat Çağla Büyükakçay in Doha, before succumbing to Zhang Shuai in three sets. She then retired in her first match at Dubai against Kateryna Bondarenko, due to injury. At Indian Wells, Muguruza advanced to the quarterfinals, beating Kirsten Flipkens, 17-year-old Kayla Day, and Elina Svitolina en route. She then lost to world No. 3, Karolína Plíšková, in two tiebreaks. At Miami, she reached the fourth round and retired against Caroline Wozniacki after losing the first set due to illness.

Muguruza suffered early losses at the start of the clay-court season, losing in her opening matches in Stuttgart and Madrid to Anett Kontaveit and Timea Bacsinszky, respectively. She bounced back in Rome by reaching the semifinals, before she had to retire against Elina Svitolina in the first set due to a neck injury. Muguruza entered the French Open as the defending champion, where she reached the fourth round, losing to home favourite Kristina Mladenovic, in three sets. In that game against Mladenovic, Muguruza had to face an extremely unfavorable crowd as well, almost bordering on unsportmanship-like behavior, since most of her unforced errors were celebrated not only by Mladenovic but by the crowd too. As she left the court and was receiving an ovation from the crowd, she was seen shaking her head and demanding the crowd not to applaud, since they wanted her to lose. In the following press conference, when asked about the pressure she suffered from the crowd, she started to cry and had to quit the press conference for about five minutes before she came to resume her thoughts on the match. This prompted a huge reaction in the Spanish sporting press, with some making the comment that "The Suzanne Lenglen Court looked more like the Stade de France, and it was as if there was a football game going on and not a tennis match". Since she failed to defend her title, Muguruza fell from the top 10.

Prior to Wimbledon, Muguruza began her grass-court season at the Birmingham Classic where she beat Elizaveta Kulichkova, Alison Riske and CoCo Vandeweghe before losing in the semi-finals to eventual runner-up Ashleigh Barty. She followed that with a second-round exit at the Eastbourne International, losing to Barbora Strýcová.

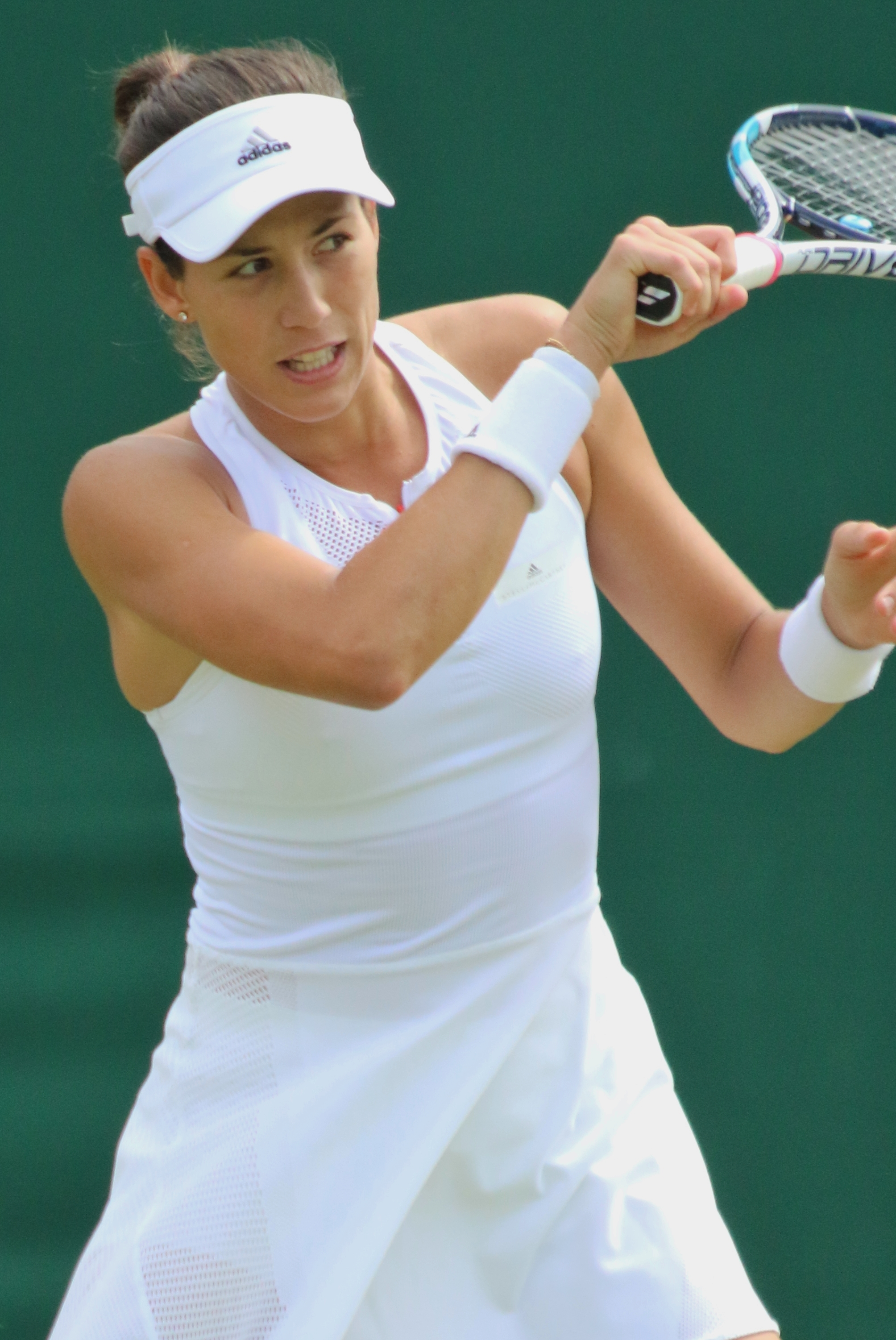
Muguruza at the 2017 Wimbledon Championships, where she won the Women's singles title

As the 14th seed, Muguruza reached the Wimbledon fourth round, beating Ekaterina Alexandrova, Yanina Wickmayer and Sorana Cîrstea. She then faced the previous year's runner-up and world No. 1, Angelique Kerber, eventually beating her in three sets. She then defeated seventh seed Svetlana Kuznetsova and then 87th-ranked Magdaléna Rybáriková, both in straight sets, to advance to her second Wimbledon final. There, she defeated tenth seed Venus Williams in straight sets, clinching her second major title, and became the first ever, and only, player to defeat both Williams sisters in major singles finals.

Muguruza started her hardcourt summer in Stanford, beating Kayla Day and Ana Konjuh before losing in the semifinals to Madison Keys. She next travelled to Toronto for the Rogers Cup, and recorded wins over Kirsten Flipkens and Ashleigh Barty. Muguruza lost in the quarterfinals to Elina Svitolina. Muguruza's next tournament was the Western and Southern Open in Cincinnati. She won two tough three set matches against Madison Keys and Svetlana Kuznetsova to make it to the semifinals. There she faced Karolína Plíšková, the world No. 1, to whom she had lost six times in a row. This time Muguruza turned the tables and won in two sets. In the final she played Simona Halep, dropping only one game in 57 minutes to capture the fifth title of her career. This also marked the first time in which she won multiple titles in one season.

Muguruza entered the US Open as a contender for the No. 1 WTA rankings. She beat Rybáriková in a rematch of the Wimbledon semifinal to reach the fourth round of the US Open for the first time, where she lost to Petra Kvitová in straight sets. Despite the loss, Muguruza rose to the No. 1 ranking after reigning No. 1 Karolína Plíšková's loss to CoCo Vandeweghe in the quarterfinals, and became the 24th woman to achieve the ranking. Muguruza and Rafael Nadal made Spain the first country since the United States 14 years ago to simultaneously top both the ATP and the WTA rankings.

In Tokyo, she lost to Wozniacki in the semifinals, winning only two games. She then lost in the quarterfinals of the Wuhan Open to Jeļena Ostapenko and retired in the first round of the China Open to Barbora Strýcová, after losing eight of the first nine games. With Simona Halep advancing to the final of the event, Muguruza ultimately lost the No. 1 ranking. Shortly after, she was named WTA Player of the Year. Muguruza was seeded second at the WTA Finals and was drawn in the red group alongside Karolína Plíšková, Venus Williams and Jeļena Ostapenko. She won her first match against Ostapenko in straight sets before losing to Plíškova, winning two games in both sets. Muguruza then faced Williams for a place in the semifinals but ended up losing in straight sets. This loss ended her chances of gaining the year-end No. 1 ranking.

=== 2018: Mixed results, out of top 10 ===
Muguruza started the season at the Brisbane International, where she was the top seed. After receiving a bye into the second round, she faced Aleksandra Krunić, but was forced to retire due to cramping in the third set. Muguruza had served for the match in the second set, and the retirement marked the third straight year she had succumbed to injuries at Brisbane. Muguruza then took a wild card into the Sydney International, where she was once again the top seed. After beating Kiki Bertens in the second round, Muguruza withdrew from the tournament due to continued physical problems.

At the Australian Open, she was the third seed, and was also in contention for the No. 1 ranking. In the first round, she beat French wild card Jessika Ponchet, in straight sets. In the second round, Muguruza was shocked by the world No. 88, Hsieh Su-wei, in straight sets.

After losing early at the Australian Open, Muguruza announced that Conchita Martínez would be rejoining her team for the next four events. In her first event back with Martínez, Garbiñe reached the Qatar Open final, recording wins over Duan Yingying, Sorana Cîrstea, and Caroline Garcia en route. She then lost to Petra Kvitová, in three sets. Muguruza then played Dubai, where she was seeded second. After receiving a first round bye, she beat CiCi Bellis and Caroline Garcia in straight sets. In the semifinals, Muguruza lost to Daria Kasatkina in three sets, despite having served for the match and held three match points in the second set.

Her next tournament was Indian Wells. In the second round, she played Sachia Vickery, ranked No. 100 in the world. Muguruza led by a set and a double break, but eventually succumbed in three sets. At the Miami Open, she reached the fourth round where she lost to eventual champion Sloane Stephens. The end of the tournament also marked the completion of Muguruza's temporary partnership with Martínez. Later that spring, she won the championship in Monterrey, Mexico, coming back from a set and a break down to defeat Tímea Babos in three sets in the final. The victory marked Muguruza's first title win since the 2017 Western & Southern Open.

Her clay-court season began with the Fed Cup World Group II play-offs, where Spain was to face Paraguay. In her first match, Muguruza faced world No. 334 Montserrat González, winning in three close sets. Muguruza had served for the match in the second set and held a match point, but was forced into a decider. Muguruza's next singles match was against Verónica Cepede Royg, which she won in straight sets. The victory ensured Spain would remain in World Group II next season. Her next tournament was Stuttgart, where she was the No. 2 seed. In her first match against Pavlyuchenkova, Muguruza retired after the first set because of a back injury. She then played in Madrid where she lost in third round to Daria Kasatkina. In Rome, Muguruza had bye in first round and in second round she lost to Daria Gavrilova.

At French Open, she defeated Svetlana Kuznetsova, Fiona Ferro, Sam Stosur, Lesia Tsurenko, and Maria Sharapova to reach the semifinals, where she lost to eventual champion Simona Halep.

Muguruza went into grass-court season as the top seed in Birmingham, where she lost in second round to Barbora Strýcová.

At Wimbledon, defending champion Muguruza was eliminated in the second round by Belgian world No. 47, Alison Van Uytvanck, and thus suffered the earliest defeat of a defending women's champion at the All England Club since Steffi Graf lost in the first round in 1994

Muguruza finished her 2018 season with her ranking at a low of 18.

=== 2019: Continued struggles, out of top 30 ===
On 15 August 2018, Hopman Cup organizers announced that Muguruza will represent Spain at the 2019 edition alongside David Ferrer. At her first appearance at the tournament, she lost to Angelique Kerber of Germany in three sets.

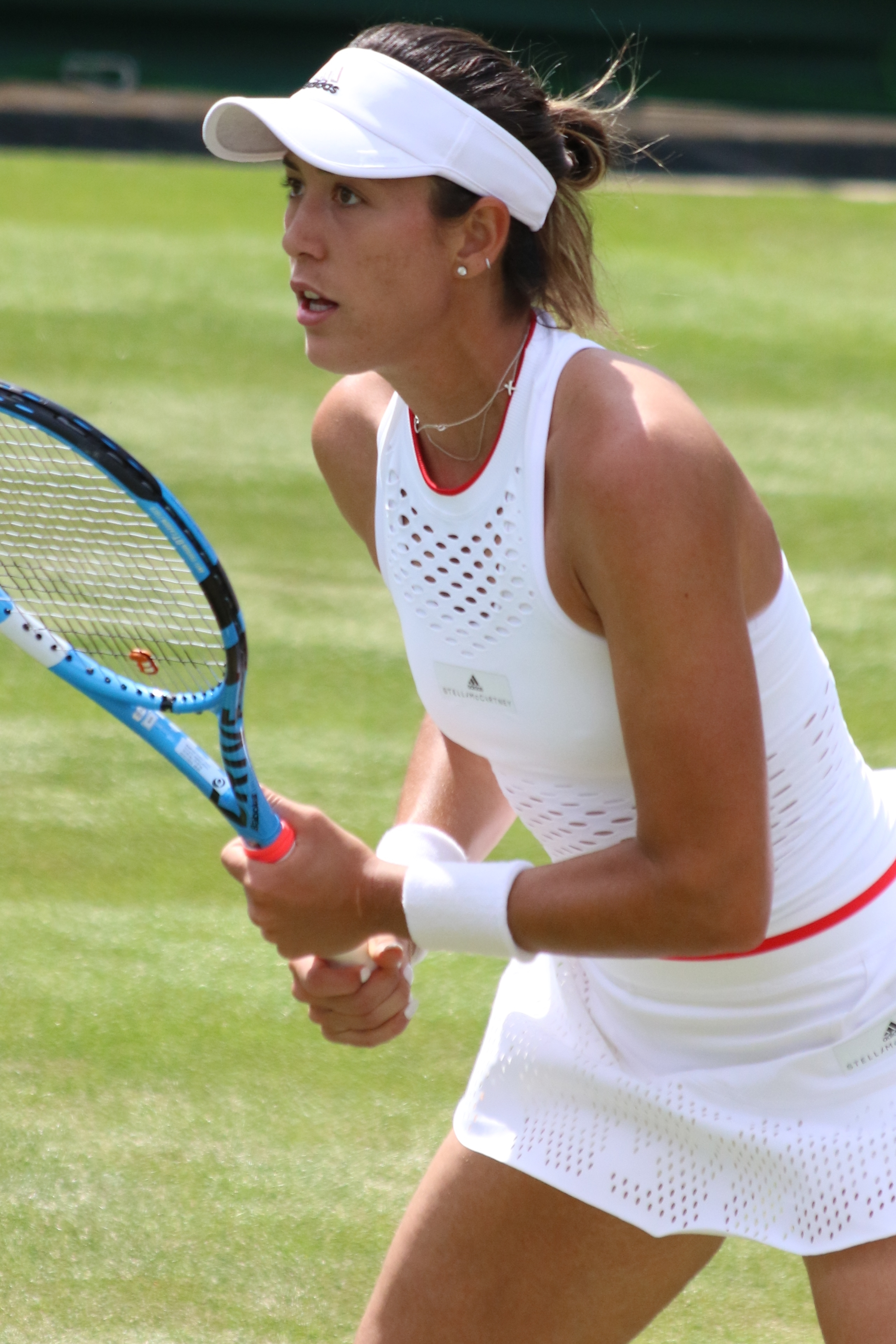
Muguruza at the 2019 Wimbledon Championships

At the French Open, Muguruza upset Elina Svitolina, the No. 9 seed, to reach her sixth consecutive round of 16. However, she subsequently lost to Sloane Stephens, in straight sets.

Muguruza's struggles at the majors would continue at Wimbledon, losing to Beatriz Haddad Maia in the first round. Following the loss, Muguruza announced a split with her longtime coach Sam Sumyk. She would also go on to lose in the first round of the US Open that year.

Cutting her tennis season short, in November, Muguruza climbed to the summit of Mount Kilimanjaro, Africa's highest mountain. She finished the season ranked No. 36.

=== 2020: Return to form, first Australian Open final ===
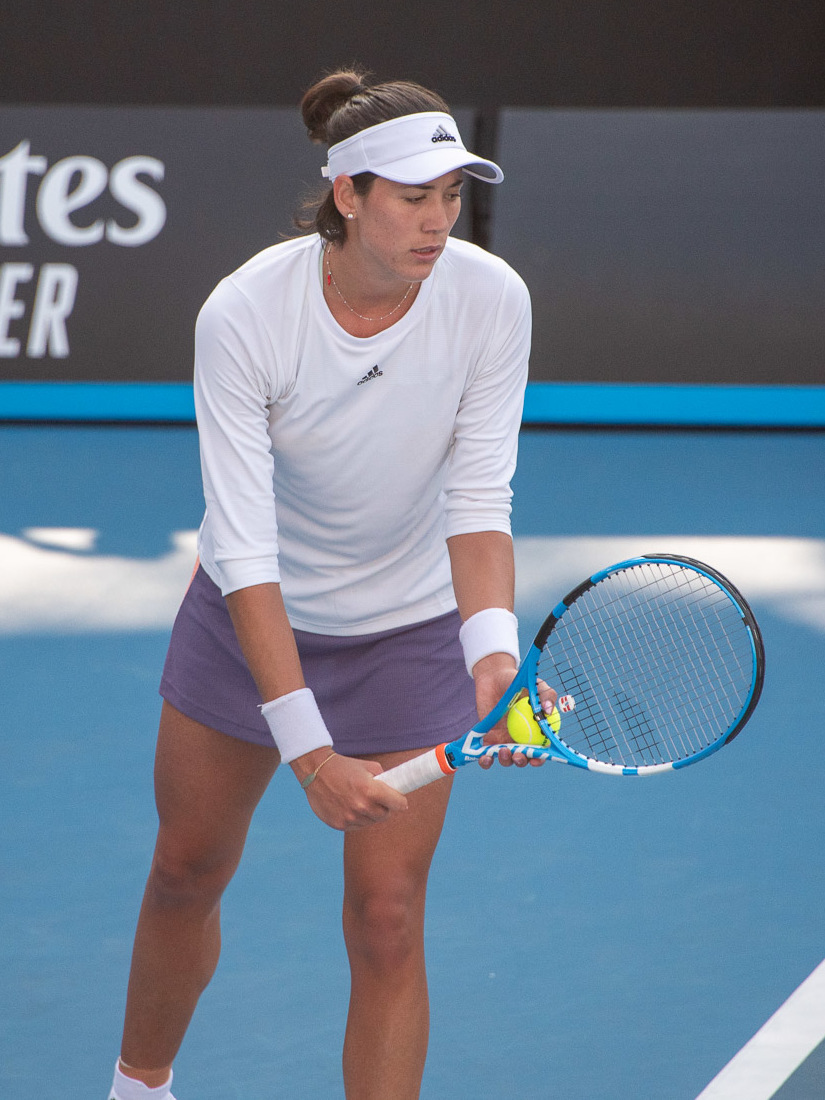
Muguruza at the 2020 Australian Open, where she reached her first final of the tournament

Muguruza began the new season with a semifinal appearance in Shenzhen, losing to eventual champion Ekaterina Alexandrova. After pulling out of her quarterfinal match in Hobart due to illness, she bounced back at the Australian Open, beating three seeded players, including fifth seed Elina Svitolina, fourth seed Simona Halep and ninth seed Kiki Bertens to reach her fourth major final, and first ever final in Melbourne. She lost it to 14th seed Sofia Kenin in three sets. She next participated at Dubai, where she defeated Kim Clijsters and Veronika Kudermetova, before being defeated by Jennifer Brady in the quarterfinals, and lost in the quarterfinals of Doha to world No. 1, Ash Barty, after defeating Daria Kasatkina, Ajla Tomljanović, and Dayana Yastremska.

Following the suspension of the WTA Tour due to the COVID-19 pandemic, she participated in the US Open, where she defeated Nao Hibino, before losing in the second round to a returning Tsvetana Pironkova, despite leading by 5–2 in the first set. She next participated at Rome, where she defeated Sloane Stephens, Coco Gauff, Johanna Konta, and Victoria Azarenka, before losing in three sets to the eventual champion, Simona Halep. She then entered the French Open, where she defeated Tamara Zidanšek and Kristýna Plíšková, before losing to Danielle Collins, despite leading 3–0, and then 5–4 in the final set. She ended the year ranked No. 15.

=== 2021: Return to top 10, WTA Finals champion, year-end No. 3 ===
Muguruza began her season at Abu Dhabi, where she scored wins over Aliaksandra Sasnovich and Kristina Mladenovic before losing to Maria Sakkari, in straight sets. In her next tournament at the Yarra Valley Classic, Muguruza dropped a total of ten games in matches against Alison Van Uytvanck, Anastasia Pavlyuchenkova, Sofia Kenin, and Markéta Vondroušová to make her first tour final since the 2020 Australian Open. In the final, she lost to world No. 1, Ash Barty, in straight sets.

At the Australian Open, Muguruza continued her run of good form with dominant wins over Margarita Gasparyan, Liudmila Samsonova, and Zarina Diyas to make her third consecutive second-week appearance at the Australian Open. In the fourth round, she lost to eventual champion Naomi Osaka in a three-setter where she held two match points in the final set. She then played the Qatar Open where she defeated in-form Russian Veronika Kudermetova, upset third seed and defending champion Aryna Sabalenka and avenged her Abu Dhabi loss to Maria Sakkari to make the semifinals. She was due to face Victoria Azarenka, but Azarenka withdrew due to a back injury. She then faced Petra Kvitová in a rematch of the 2018 final but was unable to avenge that defeat and was crushed in straight sets.

Her next tournament was in Dubai. Seeded ninth, she reached the quarterfinals with straight set wins over Irina-Camelia Begu, Amanda Anisimova and recent French Open champion Iga Świątek. She then came from a set and a break down to repeat her Doha victory over Aryna Sabalenka to reach her third Dubai semifinal. She then defeated in form tenth seed Elise Mertens in two tight sets to reach her second consecutive final and her third of the year where she defeated Barbora Krejčíková in straight sets for the title. This was her biggest title since Cincinnati in 2017 and her first title since Monterrey in 2019. This also snapped her three-match losing streak in finals. She then competed at the Miami Open and lost to Bianca Andreescu in the fourth round in three sets. In the clay court swing, she participated in Charleston and won her opening match before retiring in her next against Yulia Putintseva due to a left thigh injury which also caused her to withdraw from the Madrid Open. She then entered the Italian Open losing to Elina Svitolina in straight sets, after winning her first two rounds. Her berth at the French Open resulted in a shock first-round loss to Marta Kostyuk, in straight sets, in a match where she committed 40 unforced errors in two sets. Following Wimbledon, where she reached the third round before losing to 21st seed Ons Jabeur, Muguruza returned to the top 10 in the rankings.

After early exits from the Canadian Open by Kateřina Siniaková and the Cincinnati Open by Barbora Krejčíková, Muguruza entered the US Open as the ninth seed. She began her campaign with straight-set wins over Donna Vekić in the first round and Andrea Petkovic in the second round, which also gave her her first win over Petkovic in their head-to-head record. She then defeated 2020 US Open runner-up Azarenka in three sets before getting knocked out by Krejčíková in the fourth round, after Krejčíková called a controversial off-court medical time-out in the second set.

Next, Muguruza embarked on the inaugural Chicago Classic and entered as the second seed. She had two straight-set wins over Ann Li and Mai Hontama in the second round and quarterfinals, respectively, but also received two walkovers from Azarenka and Markéta Vondroušová in the third round and semifinals, respectively, to reach the final. There, she met Jabeur and avenged her loss to her earlier this year after she won the match in three sets to receive her ninth career singles title. Following her win, she traveled to Indian Wells, where she was upset in a three-set loss by Ajla Tomljanović in her first match there. She took on her last tournament of the year at the Kremlin Cup in Moscow and won over Tereza Martincová in three sets in the second round before she was a dealt a straight-set breadstick defeat by eventual champion Anett Kontaveit in the quarterfinals. Following her successful year, Muguruza qualified for the year-end 2021 WTA Finals. She reached the semifinals stage defeating Anett Kontaveit ending her 12 match-winning streak. She defeated Paula Badosa in an all Spanish semifinal to reach the year-end tournament final for the first time in her career and to become the first Spanish player to reach the singles final since 1993. In the final, she defeated Anett Kontaveit in straight sets for the second time in the tournament, to win her first WTA Finals championship. She ended the year ranked No. 3.

=== 2022: Loss of form, 300th WTA career win, out of top 50 ===
Muguruza began her season at the Sydney International where she was the second seed. After a first-round bye, Muguruza defeated Ekaterina Alexandrova in straight sets, before losing in the quarterfinals to Daria Kasatkina in straight sets. Muguruza entered the Australian Open as the third seed and beat Clara Burel, in straight sets, in the first round. Muguruza was upset in the second round with a straight-sets loss to world No. 61, Alizé Cornet. At Dubai, Muguruza defeated Kateřina Siniaková in the first round, before being defeated in the second round by Veronika Kudermetova. She reached her second quarterfinal of the year in Doha, defeating Sorana Cîrstea and Madison Brengle, before being defeated in straight sets by Jeļena Ostapenko.

In receipt of a first-round bye at Indian Wells, she was defeated in the second round by Alison Riske-Amritraj; she next withdrew from Miami. On 29 April, she recorded her 300th WTA career win, defeating Ajla Tomljanović at Madrid in the first round, before being defeated handily by Anhelina Kalinina in the second round. After losing in her first match at Rome by Yulia Putintseva in three sets, Muguruza accepted a wild card into Rabat. Defeating lucky loser Anna Danilina in the first round, she was defeated in the second round by Martina Trevisan. A dismal clay-court season was capped off by a first round defeat at the French Open to Kaia Kanepi. For the first time since 2013, Muguruza lost more matches on clay than she won, ending the season with a 2–4 record on the surface.

Entering Berlin as the fifth seed, she was defeated in the first round by Andrea Petkovic. In receipt of a first-round bye at Eastbourne, she defeated Magdalena Fręch before falling to Camila Giorgi. At Wimbledon, she was defeated in the first round by Greet Minnen, winning just four games.

After withdrawing from San Jose, Muguruza played her first match of the US hard court season at Toronto. In receipt of a first-round bye, she defeated Kaia Kanepi in the second round before losing to Belinda Bencic, winning just four games. In receipt of a first-round bye at Cincinnati, she was defeated in her opening match by Wimbledon champion Elena Rybakina. At the US Open, Muguruza reached the third round after defeating Clara Tauson and qualifier Linda Fruhvirtová in straight sets. In the third round, she was defeated by Petra Kvitová, despite holding two match points in the third set. After failing to defend her fourth round points obtained last year, she fell out of the top ten of the rankings for the first time since July 2021.

In receipt of a first round bye at Tokyo, she defeated Despina Papamichail before losing in the quarterfinals to the eventual champion Liudmila Samsonova, in straight sets. Next participating in San Diego, Muguruza retired from her first round match due to abdominal injury against Zheng Qinwen after falling 0–5 down. She ended her disappointing season on a sad note after withdrawing from Guadalajara Open due to illness. Due to poor results through the season, she finished the year out of top 50 for the first time since 2013.

=== 2023-24: Injuries and retirement ===
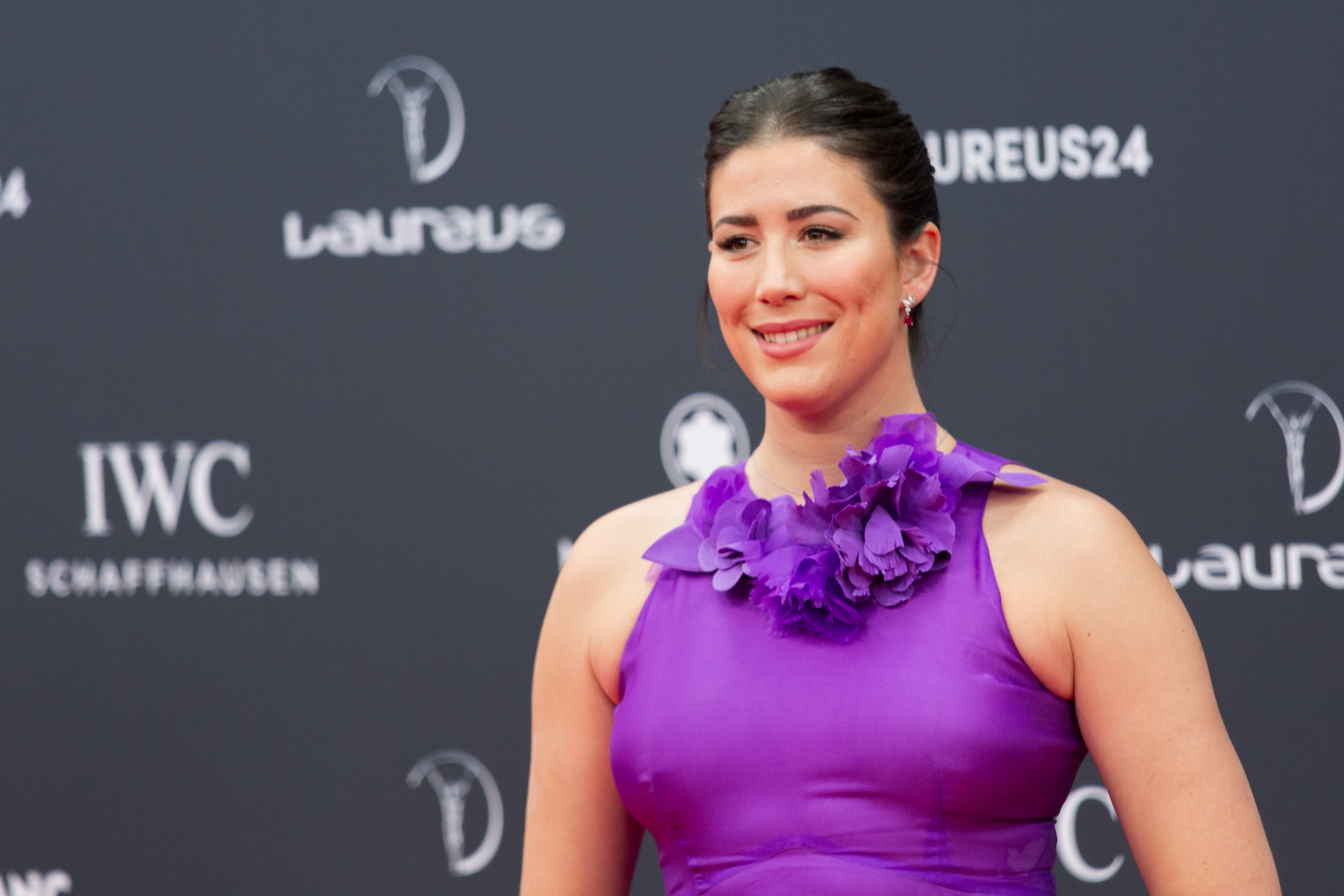
Muguruza at the 2024 Laureus World Sports Awards

Muguruza began her 2023 season at the Adelaide International 1. As a wildcard entrant, she lost in the first round to Bianca Andreescu in three sets, despite having a set and a break lead. She took another wildcard in Adelaide International 2, but lost again in the first round to Belinda Bencic in straight sets. Unseeded at the Australian Open for the first time since 2020, she lost in the first round to 26th seed Elise Mertens, in three sets. This marked her first loss in the opening round of the Australian Open since her debut in 2013. She then took a wildcard at the Lyon Open, where she lost in the first round in straight sets to qualifier Linda Nosková.

This defeat, Muguruza's sixth consecutive loss dating to September 2022, would prove to be her last professional appearance. She announced afterwards she was taking a hiatus from tennis, initially withdrawing from the Middle Eastern and American hardcourt tournaments. She later announced that she would be extending her break from tennis, withdrawing from all events up to the end of the grass court season. In an interview towards the end of 2023, she stated that she had "no intention" to return to the WTA Tour, as she was enjoying her hiatus. Muguruza formally announced her retirement from tennis on 20 April 2024 at the age of 30, ending a 12-year career.

== Playing style ==
Muguruza was an aggressive all-court player, whose game is centered around her flat, powerful groundstrokes. Her groundstrokes allow her to take time away from her opponents and dictate baseline rallies, despite the fact that Muguruza may often refrain from going for the lines, or hitting outright winners. Retired tennis player Agnieszka Radwańska described Muguruza's playing style as being "very explosive, especially from every shot. So forehand, backhand, serve, return, everything is coming to you so fast."

Her first serve is powerful, being recorded as high as 113 mph (182 km/h), allowing her to serve numerous aces in any match, and dictate play from the first stroke.

== Coaches ==
She was coached by Alejo Mancisidor from 2010 to 2015, but she then hired Sam Sumyk in 2015. Muguruza split from Sumyk in 2019, and began working again with Conchita Martínez that November. Martinez previously coached Muguruza at 2017 Wimbledon, where she won the title.

== Outside tennis ==
=== Endorsements ===
Muguruza has been endorsed by Adidas for clothing, footwear, and apparel since 2012, and frequently wears the range designed by Stella McCartney. Throughout her career, Muguruza has been endorsed by Babolat for racquets, specifically using the Pure Drive collection. She was named the ambassador for Mazda Spain in June 2014 and for BBVA bank in December 2014. Her other endorsement partners are Rolex, Evian, Jaguar Cars, Nivea, Beats Electronics, and Maui Jim. In June 2016, she was named the 14th most marketable athlete by SportsPro.

=== Philanthropy ===
In June 2017, shortly before winning her first Wimbledon women's singles crown, Muguruza announced that she had become an Ambassador for the international education NGO Room to Read. Muguruza announced plans to help the organisation grow its impact in the areas of early grade literacy and equal access to secondary education for girls.

=== Laureus Ambassador ===
In April 2024 she announced her new role as an ambassador for Laureus Sport for Good.

== Personal life ==
In 2023, she announced her engagement to Arthur Borges. They were married in October 2024.. In September 2025, she announced her pregnancy and on January 19, 2026, they welcomed their first child, a son, Marcos Borges Muguruza, with pictures shared on their Instagram accounts.

== Career statistics ==
=== Grand Slam performance timelines ===
Key
W	F	SF	QF	#R	RR	Q#	DNQ	A	NH

(W) winner; (F) finalist; (SF) semifinalist; (QF) quarterfinalist; (#R) rounds 4, 3, 2, 1; (RR) round-robin stage; (Q#) qualification round; (DNQ) did not qualify; (A) absent; (NH) not held; (SR) strike rate (events won / competed); (W–L) win–loss record.
To avoid confusion and double counting, these charts are updated at the conclusion of a tournament or when the player's participation has ended.

==== Singles ====
Tournament	2012	2013	2014	2015	2016	2017	2018	2019	2020	2021	2022	2023	SR	W–L	Win%
Australian Open	A	2R	4R	4R	3R	QF	2R	4R	F	4R	2R	1R	0 / 11	27–11	71%
French Open	Q3	2R	QF	QF	W	4R	SF	4R	3R	1R	1R	A	1 / 10	29–9	76%
Wimbledon	Q2	2R	1R	F	2R	W	2R	1R	NH	3R	1R	A	1 / 9	18–8	69%
US Open	1R	A	1R	2R	2R	4R	2R	1R	2R	4R	3R	A	0 / 10	12–10	55%
Win–loss	0–1	3–3	7–4	14–4	11–3	17–3	8–4	6–4	9–3	8–4	3–4	0–1	2 / 40	86–38	69%

==== Doubles ====
Tournament	2013	2014	2015	SR	W–L
Australian Open	A	2R	2R	0 / 2	2–2
French Open	1R	SF	1R	0 / 3	4–3
Wimbledon	1R	3R	2R	0 / 3	3–3
US Open	A	3R	2R	0 / 2	3–2
Win–loss	0–2	9–4	3–4	0 / 10	12–10

=== Grand Slam tournament finals ===
==== Singles: 4 (2 titles, 2 runner-ups) ====
Result	Year	Championship	Surface	Opponent	Score
Loss	2015	Wimbledon	Grass	(United States) Serena Williams	4–6, 4–6
Win	2016	French Open	Clay	(United States) Serena Williams	7–5, 6–4
Win	2017	Wimbledon	Grass	(United States) Venus Williams	7–5, 6–0
Loss	2020	Australian Open	Hard	(United States) Sofia Kenin	6–4, 2–6, 2–6

== Notes ==
Sporting positions
Preceded by (Czech Republic) Karolína Plíšková	World No. 1; 11 September 2017 – 9 October 2017	Succeeded by (Romania) Simona Halep
Awards and achievements
Preceded by (Germany) Angelique Kerber	WTA Player of The Year; 2017	(Romania) Simona Halep
Preceded by (Germany) Angelique Kerber	ITF World Champion; 2017	(Romania) Simona Halep
