= 2015 Aegon International =

- Date: 22–27 June
- Edition: 41st
- Category: WTA Premier
- Draw: 48S / 16D
- Prize money: $731,000
- Surface: Grass
- Location: Eastbourne, United Kingdom
- Venue: Devonshire Park LTC

Champions

Singles
- (Switzerland) Belinda Bencic

Doubles
- (France) Caroline Garcia / (Slovenia) Katarina Srebotnik
- Aegon International

The 2015 Aegon International was a women's tennis tournament played on outdoor grass courts. It was the 41st edition of the tournament, and was classified as a WTA Premier tournament on the 2015 WTA Tour. The event took place at the Devonshire Park Lawn Tennis Club in Eastbourne, United Kingdom from 22 June through 27 June 2015. Unseeded Belinda Bencic won the singles title.

== Finals ==
=== Singles ===
- (Switzerland) Belinda Bencic defeated (Poland) Agnieszka Radwańska, 6–4, 4–6, 6–0

=== Doubles ===
- (France) Caroline Garcia / (Slovenia) Katarina Srebotnik defeated (Chinese Taipei) Chan Yung-jan / (China) Zheng Jie, 7–6^{(7–5)}, 6–2

== Points and prize money ==
=== Point distribution ===
Event	W	F	SF	QF	Round of 16	Round of 32	Round of 64	Q	Q2	Q1
Singles	470	305	185	100	55	30	1	25	13	1
Doubles	470	305	185	100	1	—N/a	—N/a	—N/a	—N/a	—N/a

=== Prize money ===
Event	W	F	SF	QF	Round of 16	Round of 32	Round of 64	Q2	Q1
Singles	$124,000	$66,000	$33,005	$16,725	$8,700	$4,550	$3,000	$1,245	$750
Doubles	$39,000	$20,650	$11,360	$5,785	$3,140	—N/a	—N/a	—N/a	—N/a

== Singles main-draw entrants ==
=== Seeds ===
Country	Player	Rank^{1}	Seed
~~CZE~~	~~Petra Kvitová~~	~~2~~	~~1~~
DEN	Caroline Wozniacki	5	2
CZE	Lucie Šafářová	6	3
RUS	Ekaterina Makarova	8	4
ESP	Carla Suárez Navarro	9	5
~~GER~~	~~Angelique Kerber~~	~~10~~	~~6~~
CAN	Eugenie Bouchard	11	7
CZE	Karolína Plíšková	12	8
POL	Agnieszka Radwańska	13	9
GER	Andrea Petkovic	14	10
UKR	Elina Svitolina	17	11
USA	Madison Keys	18	12
ITA	Sara Errani	20	13
ESP	Garbiñe Muguruza	21	14
ITA	Flavia Pennetta	22	15
AUS	Samantha Stosur	23	16

- ^{1} Rankings are as of 15 June 2015.

=== Other entrants ===
The following players received wildcards into the main draw:

- (United Kingdom) Naomi Broady
- (United Kingdom) Harriet Dart
- (United Kingdom) Johanna Konta

The following players received entry from the qualifying draw:

- (United States) Lauren Davis
- (Romania) Alexandra Dulgheru
- (New Zealand) Marina Erakovic
- (United States) Irina Falconi
- (Australia) Jarmila Gajdošová
- (United States) Christina McHale
- (Slovenia) Polona Hercog
- (Slovakia) Magdaléna Rybáriková

The following players received entry as lucky losers:

- (Russia) Daria Gavrilova
- (Romania) Monica Niculescu

=== Withdrawals ===
Before the tournament

- (Switzerland) Timea Bacsinszky →replaced by (Slovakia) Anna Karolína Schmiedlová
- (Germany) Angelique Kerber (viral illness) →replaced by (Romania) Monica Niculescu
- (Czech Republic) Petra Kvitová (viral illness) →replaced by (Russia) Daria Gavrilova

During the tournament

- (Russia) Daria Gavrilova (abdominal injury)

=== Retirements ===
- (Canada) Eugenie Bouchard (abdominal injury)
- (Denmark) Caroline Wozniacki (lower back injury)

== Doubles main-draw entrants ==
=== Seeds ===
Country	Player	Country	Player	Rank^{1}	Seed
SUI	Martina Hingis	IND	Sania Mirza	3	1
RUS	Ekaterina Makarova	RUS	Elena Vesnina	6	2
HUN	Tímea Babos	FRA	Kristina Mladenovic	16	3
FRA	Caroline Garcia	SLO	Katarina Srebotnik	44	4

- ^{1} Rankings are as of 15 June 2015.

=== Other entrants ===
The following pairs received wildcards into the doubles main draw:

- (Canada) Eugenie Bouchard / (New Zealand) Marina Erakovic
- (Czech Republic) Petra Kvitová / (Denmark) Caroline Wozniacki
- (United Kingdom) Jocelyn Rae / (United Kingdom) Anna Smith

The following pairs received entry as alternates:

- (Spain) Lara Arruabarrena / (Romania) Irina-Camelia Begu
- (Romania) Monica Niculescu / (Australia) Arina Rodionova

=== Withdrawals ===
Before the tournament

- (Canada) Eugenie Bouchard (abdominal injury)
- (Czech Republic) Petra Kvitová (viral illness)

During the tournament

- (Russia) Ekaterina Makarova (left Achilles tendon injury)

=== Retirements ===
- (United Kingdom) Jocelyn Rae (tonsillitis)
