= 2015 Aegon International – Doubles =

Doubles
- 2015 Aegon International

Final
- Champions: (France) Caroline Garcia (Slovenia) Katarina Srebotnik
- Runners-up: (Chinese Taipei) Chan Yung-jan (China) Zheng Jie
- Score: 7–6^{(7–5)}, 6–2

Details
- Draw: 16
- Seeds: 4

Events
Singles	Doubles
← 2014 ·	Eastbourne International	· 2016 →

Chan Hao-ching and Chan Yung-jan were the defending champions, but chose not to participate together. Chan Hao-ching played alongside Flavia Pennetta, but lost in the quarterfinals to Martina Hingis and Sania Mirza.
Chan Yung-jan teamed up with Zheng Jie, but lost to Caroline Garcia and Katarina Srebotnik in the final, 6–7^{(5–7)}, 2–6.

== Seeds ==
1. (Switzerland) Martina Hingis / (India) Sania Mirza (semifinals)
2. (Russia) Ekaterina Makarova / (Russia) Elena Vesnina (semifinals, withdrew)
3. (Hungary) Tímea Babos / (France) Kristina Mladenovic (first round)
4. (France) Caroline Garcia / (Slovenia) Katarina Srebotnik (champions)

== Draw ==
=== Key ===
- Q = Qualifier
- WC = Wild card
- LL = Lucky loser
- Alt = Alternate
- SE = Special exempt
- PR = Protected ranking
- ITF = ITF entry
- JE = Junior exempt
- w/o = Walkover
- r = Retired
- d = Defaulted
- SR = Special ranking

=== Draw ===
First round
1	(Switzerland) M Hingis (India) S Mirza	6	6
(Netherlands) M Krajicek (Czech Republic) Ka Plíšková	0	2
(Germany) A-L Grönefeld (Poland) A Rosolska	4	7	[7]
(Chinese Taipei) H-c Chan (Italy) F Pennetta	6	5	[10]
4	(France) C Garcia (Slovenia) K Srebotnik	6	6
(Poland) K Jans-Ignacik (Slovenia) A Klepač	3	4
(Russia) V Dushevina (Spain) MJ Mártinez Sánchez	3	7	[9]
WC	(United Kingdom) J Rae (United Kingdom) A Smith	6	5	[11]
(Spain) A Medina Garrigues (Spain) A Parra Santonja	6^{2}	2
(Germany) J Görges (Czech Republic) L Hradecká	7^{7}	6
(Chinese Taipei) Y-j Chan (China) J Zheng	7^{7}	6
3	(Hungary) T Babos (France) K Mladenovic	6^{5}	3
(Zimbabwe) C Black (United States) L Raymond	3	6	[10]
Alt	(Romania) M Niculescu (Australia) Ar Rodionova	6	3	[8]
Alt	(Spain) L Arruabarrena (Romania) I-C Begu	4	0
2	(Russia) E Makarova (Russia) E Vesnina	6	6

Quarterfinals
1	(Switzerland) M Hingis (India) S Mirza	4	6	[10]
(Chinese Taipei) H-c Chan (Italy) F Pennetta	6	3	[6]
4	(France) C Garcia (Slovenia) K Srebotnik	6	0
WC	(United Kingdom) J Rae (United Kingdom) A Smith	1	0^{r}
(Germany) J Görges (Czech Republic) L Hradecká	3	6	[9]
(Chinese Taipei) Y-j Chan (China) J Zheng	6	3	[11]
(Zimbabwe) C Black (United States) L Raymond	5	5
2	(Russia) E Makarova (Russia) E Vesnina	7	7

Semifinals
1	(Switzerland) M Hingis (India) S Mirza	5	4
4	(France) C Garcia (Slovenia) K Srebotnik	7	6
(Chinese Taipei) Y-j Chan (China) J Zheng	^{w/o}
2	(Russia) E Makarova (Russia) E Vesnina

Final
4	(France) C Garcia (Slovenia) K Srebotnik	7^{7}	6
(Chinese Taipei) Y-j Chan (China) J Zheng	6^{5}	2
