= WTA Premier tournaments =

Tournament category in women's tennis

WTA Premier tournaments was a category of tennis tournaments in the WTA Tour, implemented from the reorganization of the schedule in 2009 until 2020.

In 2020, Premier events included:

- Four "Premier Mandatory" events in Indian Wells, Miami, Madrid, and Beijing with prize money of $4.5 million.
- Five "Premier 5" events in Doha, Rome, Cincinnati, Toronto/Montreal, and Wuhan with prize money of $2 million.
- Twelve "Premier" events with prize money of $600,000 to $1,000,000.

The ranking points awarded to the winners of these tournaments are:

- "Premier Mandatory" 1000
- "Premier 5" 900 and
- "Premier" 470.

This compares to 2,000 points for winning a Grand Slam Tournament ("major"), up to 1,500 points for winning the WTA Finals, and 280 for winning an International tournament. This system differs from that used for the men's ATP rankings, but only slightly. The men have nine Masters events with 1,000 points for the winner (akin to WTA Premier Mandatory and Premier 5 tournaments), and the next two tiers of ATP tournaments offer 500 and 250 points for winning respectively.

== Events ==
Legend
Premier Mandatory
Premier 5
Premier

Tournament	Officially known as	City(ies)	Country	Surface	Prize (US$)	Current singles champion
Brisbane	Brisbane International	Brisbane	Australia	Hard	1,000,000	(Czech Republic) Karolína Plíšková (2020)
Adelaide	Adelaide International	Adelaide	Australia	Hard	848,000	(Australia) Ashleigh Barty (2020)
St. Petersburg	St. Petersburg Ladies' Trophy	St. Petersburg	Russia	Hard (i)	823,000	(Netherlands) Kiki Bertens (2020)
Dubai	Dubai Duty Free Tennis Championships	Dubai	United Arab Emirates	Hard	2,828,000	(Romania) Simona Halep (2020)
Doha	Qatar Total Open	Doha	Qatar	Hard	916,131	(Belarus) Aryna Sabalenka (2020)
Indian Wells	BNP Paribas Open	Indian Wells	United States	Hard	9,035,428	(Canada) Bianca Andreescu (2019)
Miami	Miami Open	Miami Gardens	United States	Hard	9,035,428	(Australia) Ashleigh Barty (2019)
Charleston	Volvo Car Open	Charleston	United States	Clay	823,000	(United States) Madison Keys (2019)
Stuttgart	Porsche Tennis Grand Prix	Stuttgart	Germany	Clay (i)	886,077	(Czech Republic) Petra Kvitová (2019)
Madrid	Mutua Madrid Open	Madrid	Spain	Clay	7,021,128	(Netherlands) Kiki Bertens (2019)
Rome	Internazionali BNL d'Italia	Rome	Italy	Clay	3,452,538	(Romania) Simona Halep (2020)
Eastbourne	Nature Valley International	Eastbourne	United Kingdom	Grass	998,712	(Czech Republic) Karolína Plíšková (2019)
San Jose	Mubadala Silicon Valley Classic	San Jose	United States	Hard	799,000	(China) Zheng Saisai (2019)
Canada	Rogers Cup	Toronto / Montreal	Canada	Hard	2,820,000	(Canada) Bianca Andreescu (2019)
Cincinnati	Western & Southern Open	Mason	United States	Hard	2,874,299	(Belarus) Victoria Azarenka (2020)
Zhengzhou	Zhengzhou Open	Zhengzhou	China	Hard	799,000	(Czech Republic) Karolína Plíšková (2019)
Ostrava	J&T Banka Ostrava Open	Ostrava	Czech Republic	Hard	528,500	(Belarus) Aryna Sabalenka (2020)
Tokyo	Toray Pan Pacific Open	Tokyo	Japan	Hard	799,000	(Japan) Naomi Osaka (2019)
Wuhan	Dongfeng Motor Wuhan Open	Wuhan	China	Hard	2,746,000	(Belarus) Aryna Sabalenka (2019)
Beijing	China Open	Beijing	China	Hard	8,285,274	(Japan) Naomi Osaka (2019)
Moscow	Kremlin Cup	Moscow	Russia	Hard (i)	932,866	(Switzerland) Belinda Bencic (2019)

== Singles results ==
=== 2009 ===
Tournament	Winner	Runner-up	Score
Premier Mandatory
Indian Wells	(Russia) Vera Zvonareva	(Serbia) Ana Ivanovic	7–6^{(7–5)}, 6–2
Miami	(Belarus) Victoria Azarenka	(United States) Serena Williams	6–3, 6–1
Madrid	(Russia) Dinara Safina	(Denmark) Caroline Wozniacki	6–2, 6–4
Beijing	(Russia) Svetlana Kuznetsova	(Poland) Agnieszka Radwańska	6–2, 6–4
Premier 5
Dubai	(United States) Venus Williams	(France) Virginie Razzano	6–4, 6–2
Rome	(Russia) Dinara Safina	(Russia) Svetlana Kuznetsova	6–3, 6–2
Cincinnati	(Serbia) Jelena Janković	(Russia) Dinara Safina	6–4, 6–2
Canada (Toronto)	(Russia) Elena Dementieva	(Russia) Maria Sharapova	6–4, 6–3
Tokyo	(Russia) Maria Sharapova	(Serbia) Jelena Janković	5–2 retired
Premier
Sydney	(Russia) Elena Dementieva	(Russia) Dinara Safina	6–3, 2–6, 6–1
Paris	(France) Amélie Mauresmo	(Russia) Elena Dementieva	7–6^{(9–7)}, 2–6, 6–4
Charleston	(Germany) Sabine Lisicki	(Denmark) Caroline Wozniacki	6–2, 6–4
Stuttgart	(Russia) Svetlana Kuznetsova	(Russia) Dinara Safina	6–4, 6–3
Warsaw	(Romania) Alexandra Dulgheru	(Ukraine) Alona Bondarenko	7–6^{(7–3)}, 3–6, 6–0
Eastbourne	(Denmark) Caroline Wozniacki	(France) Virginie Razzano	7–6, 7–5
Stanford	(France) Marion Bartoli	(United States) Venus Williams	6–2, 5–7, 6–4
Los Angeles	(Italy) Flavia Pennetta	(Australia) Samantha Stosur	6–4, 6–3
New Haven	(Denmark) Caroline Wozniacki	(Russia) Elena Vesnina	6–2, 6–4
Moscow	(Italy) Francesca Schiavone	(Belarus) Olga Govortsova	6–3, 6–0

=== 2010 ===
Tournament	Winner	Runner-up	Score
Premier Mandatory
Indian Wells	(Serbia) Jelena Janković	(Denmark) Caroline Wozniacki	6–2, 6–4
Miami	(Belgium) Kim Clijsters	(United States) Venus Williams	6–2, 6–1
Madrid	(France) Aravane Rezaï	(United States) Venus Williams	6–2, 7–5
Beijing	(Denmark) Caroline Wozniacki	(Russia) Vera Zvonareva	6–3, 3–6, 6–3
Premier 5
Dubai	(United States) Venus Williams	(Belarus) Victoria Azarenka	6–3, 7–5
Rome	(Spain) María José Martínez	(Serbia) Jelena Janković	7–6^{(7–5)}, 7–5
Cincinnati	(Belgium) Kim Clijsters	(Russia) Maria Sharapova	2–6, 7–6^{(7–4)}, 6–2
Canada (Montreal)	(Denmark) Caroline Wozniacki	(Russia) Vera Zvonareva	6–3, 6–2
Tokyo	(Denmark) Caroline Wozniacki	(Russia) Elena Dementieva	1–6, 6–2, 6–3
Premier
Sydney	(Russia) Elena Dementieva	(United States) Serena Williams	6–3, 6–2
Paris	(Russia) Elena Dementieva	(Czech Republic) Lucie Šafářová	6–7^{(5–7)}, 6–1, 6–4
Charleston	(Australia) Samantha Stosur	(Russia) Vera Zvonareva	6–0, 6–3
Stuttgart	(Belgium) Justine Henin	(Australia) Samantha Stosur	6–4, 2–6, 6–1
Warsaw	(Romania) Alexandra Dulgheru	(China) Zheng Jie	6–3, 6–4
Eastbourne	(Russia) Ekaterina Makarova	(Belarus) Victoria Azarenka	7–6^{(7–5)}, 6–4
Stanford	(Belarus) Victoria Azarenka	(Russia) Maria Sharapova	6–4, 6–1
San Diego	(Russia) Svetlana Kuznetsova	(Poland) Agnieszka Radwańska	6–4, 6–7^{(7–9)}, 6–3
New Haven	(Denmark) Caroline Wozniacki	(Russia) Nadia Petrova	6–3, 3–6, 6–3
Moscow	(Belarus) Victoria Azarenka	(Russia) Maria Kirilenko	6–3, 6–4

=== 2011 ===
Tournament	Winner	Runner-up	Score
Premier Mandatory
Indian Wells	(Denmark) Caroline Wozniacki	(France) Marion Bartoli	6–1, 2–6, 6–3
Miami	(Belarus) Victoria Azarenka	(Russia) Maria Sharapova	6–1, 6–4
Madrid	(Czech Republic) Petra Kvitová	(Belarus) Victoria Azarenka	7–6^{(7–3)}, 6–4
Beijing	(Poland) Agnieszka Radwańska	(Germany) Andrea Petkovic	7–5, 0–6, 6–4
Premier 5
Dubai	(Denmark) Caroline Wozniacki	(Russia) Svetlana Kuznetsova	6–1, 6–3
Rome	(Russia) Maria Sharapova	(Australia) Samantha Stosur	6–2, 6–4
Canada (Toronto)	(United States) Serena Williams	(Australia) Samantha Stosur	6–4, 6–2
Cincinnati	(Russia) Maria Sharapova	(Serbia) Jelena Janković	4–6, 7–6^{(7–3)}, 6–3
Tokyo	(Poland) Agnieszka Radwańska	(Russia) Vera Zvonareva	6–3, 6–2
Premier
Sydney	(China) Li Na	(Belgium) Kim Clijsters	7–6^{(7–3)}, 6–3
Paris	(Czech Republic) Petra Kvitová	(Belgium) Kim Clijsters	6–4, 6–3
Doha	(Russia) Vera Zvonareva	(Denmark) Caroline Wozniacki	6–4, 6–4
Charleston	(Denmark) Caroline Wozniacki	(Russia) Elena Vesnina	6–2, 6–3
Stuttgart	(Germany) Julia Görges	(Denmark) Caroline Wozniacki	7–6^{(7–3)}, 6–3
Brussels	(Denmark) Caroline Wozniacki	(China) Peng Shuai	2–6, 6–3, 6–3
Eastbourne	(France) Marion Bartoli	(Czech Republic) Petra Kvitová	6–1, 4–6, 7–5
Stanford	(United States) Serena Williams	(France) Marion Bartoli	7–5, 6–1
San Diego	(Poland) Agnieszka Radwańska	(Russia) Vera Zvonareva	6–3, 6–4
New Haven	(Denmark) Caroline Wozniacki	(Czech Republic) Petra Cetkovská	6–4, 6–1
Moscow	(Slovakia) Dominika Cibulková	(Estonia) Kaia Kanepi	3–6, 7–6^{(7–1)}, 7–5

=== 2012 ===
Tournament	Winner	Runner-up	Score
Premier Mandatory
Indian Wells	(Belarus) Victoria Azarenka	(Russia) Maria Sharapova	6–2, 6–3
Miami	(Poland) Agnieszka Radwańska	(Russia) Maria Sharapova	7–5, 6–4
Madrid	(United States) Serena Williams	(Belarus) Victoria Azarenka	6–1, 6–3
Beijing	(Belarus) Victoria Azarenka	(Russia) Maria Sharapova	6–3, 6–1
Premier 5
Doha	(Belarus) Victoria Azarenka	(Australia) Samantha Stosur	6–1, 6–2
Rome	(Russia) Maria Sharapova	(China) Li Na	4–6, 6–4, 7–6^{(7–5)}
Canada (Montreal)	(Czech Republic) Petra Kvitová	(China) Li Na	7–5, 2–6, 6–3
Cincinnati	(China) Li Na	(Germany) Angelique Kerber	1–6, 6–3, 6–1
Tokyo	(Russia) Nadia Petrova	(Poland) Agnieszka Radwańska	6–0, 1–6, 6–3
Premier
Brisbane	(Estonia) Kaia Kanepi	(Slovakia) Daniela Hantuchová	6–2, 6–1
Sydney	(Belarus) Victoria Azarenka	(China) Li Na	6–2, 1–6, 6–3
Paris	(Germany) Angelique Kerber	(France) Marion Bartoli	7–6^{(7–3)}, 5–7, 6–3
Dubai	(Poland) Agnieszka Radwańska	(Germany) Julia Görges	7–5, 6–4
Charleston	(United States) Serena Williams	(Czech Republic) Lucie Šafářová	6–0, 6–1
Stuttgart	(Russia) Maria Sharapova	(Belarus) Victoria Azarenka	6–1, 6–4
Brussels	(Poland) Agnieszka Radwańska	(Romania) Simona Halep	7–5, 6–0
Eastbourne	(Austria) Tamira Paszek	(Germany) Angelique Kerber	5–7, 6–3, 7–5
Stanford	(United States) Serena Williams	(United States) CoCo Vandeweghe	7–5, 6–3
Carlsbad	(Slovakia) Dominika Cibulková	(France) Marion Bartoli	6–1, 7–5
New Haven	(Czech Republic) Petra Kvitová	(Russia) Maria Kirilenko	7–6^{(11–9)}, 7–5
Moscow	(Denmark) Caroline Wozniacki	(Australia) Samantha Stosur	6–2, 4–6, 7–5

=== 2013 ===
Tournament	Winner	Runner-up	Score
Premier Mandatory
Indian Wells	(Russia) Maria Sharapova	(Denmark) Caroline Wozniacki	6–2, 6–2
Miami	(United States) Serena Williams	(Russia) Maria Sharapova	4–6, 6–3, 6–0
Madrid	(United States) Serena Williams	(Russia) Maria Sharapova	6–1, 6–4
Beijing	(United States) Serena Williams	(Serbia) Jelena Janković	6–2, 6–2
Premier 5
Doha	(Belarus) Victoria Azarenka	(United States) Serena Williams	7–6^{(8–6)}, 2–6, 6–3
Rome	(United States) Serena Williams	(Belarus) Victoria Azarenka	6–1, 6–3
Canada (Toronto)	(United States) Serena Williams	(Romania) Sorana Cîrstea	6–2, 6–0
Cincinnati	(Belarus) Victoria Azarenka	(United States) Serena Williams	2–6, 6–2, 7–6^{(8–6)}
Tokyo	(Czech Republic) Petra Kvitová	(Germany) Angelique Kerber	6–2, 0–6, 6–3
Premier
Brisbane	(United States) Serena Williams	(Russia) Anastasia Pavlyuchenkova	6–2, 6–1
Sydney	(Poland) Agnieszka Radwańska	(Slovakia) Dominika Cibulková	6–0, 6–0
Paris	(Germany) Mona Barthel	(Italy) Sara Errani	7–5, 7–6^{(7–4)}
Dubai	(Czech Republic) Petra Kvitová	(Italy) Sara Errani	6–2, 1–6, 6–1
Charleston	(United States) Serena Williams	(Serbia) Jelena Janković	3–6, 6–0, 6–2
Stuttgart	(Russia) Maria Sharapova	(China) Li Na	6–4, 6–3
Brussels	(Estonia) Kaia Kanepi	(China) Peng Shuai	6–2, 7–5
Eastbourne	(Russia) Elena Vesnina	(United States) Jamie Hampton	6–2, 6–1
Stanford	(Slovakia) Dominika Cibulková	(Poland) Agnieszka Radwańska	3–6, 6–4, 6–4
Carlsbad	(Australia) Samantha Stosur	(Belarus) Victoria Azarenka	6–2, 6–3
New Haven	(Romania) Simona Halep	(Czech Republic) Petra Kvitová	6–2, 6–2
Moscow	(Romania) Simona Halep	(Australia) Samantha Stosur	7–6, 6–2

=== 2014 ===
Tournament	Winner	Runner-up	Score
Premier Mandatory
Indian Wells	(Italy) Flavia Pennetta	(Poland) Agnieszka Radwańska	6–2, 6–1
Miami	(United States) Serena Williams	(China) Li Na	7–5, 6–1
Madrid	(Russia) Maria Sharapova	(Romania) Simona Halep	1–6, 6–2, 6–3
Beijing	(Russia) Maria Sharapova	(Czech Republic) Petra Kvitová	6–4, 2–6, 6–3
Premier 5
Doha	(Romania) Simona Halep	(Germany) Angelique Kerber	6–2, 6–3
Rome	(United States) Serena Williams	(Italy) Sara Errani	6–3, 6–0
Montreal	(Poland) Agnieszka Radwańska	(United States) Venus Williams	6–4, 6–2
Cincinnati	(United States) Serena Williams	(Serbia) Ana Ivanovic	6–4, 6–1
Wuhan	(Czech Republic) Petra Kvitová	(Canada) Eugenie Bouchard	6–3, 6–4
Premier
Brisbane	(United States) Serena Williams	(Belarus) Victoria Azarenka	6–4, 7–5
Sydney	(Bulgaria) Tsvetana Pironkova	(Germany) Angelique Kerber	6–4, 6–4
Paris	(Russia) Anastasia Pavlyuchenkova	(Italy) Sara Errani	3–6, 6–2, 6–3
Dubai	(United States) Venus Williams	(France) Alizé Cornet	6–3, 6–0
Charleston	(Germany) Andrea Petkovic	(Slovakia) Jana Čepelová	7–5, 6–2
Stuttgart	(Russia) Maria Sharapova	(Serbia) Ana Ivanovic	3–6, 6–4, 6–1
Birmingham	(Serbia) Ana Ivanovic	(Czech Republic) Barbora Záhlavová-Strýcová	6–3, 6–2
Eastbourne	(United States) Madison Keys	(Germany) Angelique Kerber	6–3, 3–6, 7–5
Stanford	(United States) Serena Williams	(Germany) Angelique Kerber	7–6^{(7–1)}, 6–3
New Haven	(Czech Republic) Petra Kvitová	(Slovakia) Magdaléna Rybáriková	6–4, 6–2
Tokyo	(Serbia) Ana Ivanovic	(Denmark) Caroline Wozniacki	6–2, 7–6^{(7–2)}
Moscow	(Russia) Anastasia Pavlyuchenkova	(Romania) Irina-Camelia Begu	6–4, 5–7, 6–1

=== 2015 ===
Tournament	Winner	Runner-up	Score
Premier Mandatory
Indian Wells	(Romania) Simona Halep	(Serbia) Jelena Janković	2–6, 7–5, 6–4
Miami	(United States) Serena Williams	(Spain) Carla Suárez Navarro	6–2, 6–0
Madrid	(Czech Republic) Petra Kvitová	(Russia) Svetlana Kuznetsova	6–1, 6–2
Beijing	(Spain) Garbiñe Muguruza	(Switzerland) Timea Bacsinszky	7–5, 6–4
Premier 5
Dubai	(Romania) Simona Halep	(Czech Republic) Karolína Plíšková	6–4, 7–6^{(7–4)}
Rome	(Russia) Maria Sharapova	(Spain) Carla Suárez Navarro	4–6, 7–5, 6–1
Canada (Toronto)	(Switzerland) Belinda Bencic	(Romania) Simona Halep	7–6^{(7—5)}, 6–7^{(4–7)}, 3–0^{r}
Cincinnati	(United States) Serena Williams	(Romania) Simona Halep	6–3, 7–6^{(7—5)}
Wuhan	(United States) Venus Williams	(Spain) Garbiñe Muguruza	6–3, 3–0^{r}
Premier
Brisbane	(Russia) Maria Sharapova	(Serbia) Ana Ivanovic	6–7^{(4–6)}, 6–3, 6–3
Sydney	(Czech Republic) Petra Kvitová	(Czech Republic) Karolína Plíšková	7–6^{(7–5)}, 7–6^{(8–7)}
Antwerp	(Germany) Andrea Petkovic	(Spain) Carla Suárez Navarro	walkover
Doha	(Czech Republic) Lucie Šafářová	(Belarus) Victoria Azarenka	6–4, 6–3
Charleston	(Germany) Angelique Kerber	(United States) Madison Keys	6–2, 4–6, 7–5
Stuttgart	(Germany) Angelique Kerber	(Denmark) Caroline Wozniacki	3–6, 6–1, 7–5
Birmingham	(Germany) Angelique Kerber	(Czech Republic) Karolína Plíšková	6–7^{(5–7)}, 6–3, 7–6^{(7–4)}
Eastbourne	(Switzerland) Belinda Bencic	(Poland) Agnieszka Radwańska	6–4, 4–6, 6–0
Stanford	(Germany) Angelique Kerber	(Czech Republic) Karolína Plíšková	6–3, 5–7, 6–4
New Haven	(Czech Republic) Petra Kvitová	(Czech Republic) Lucie Šafářová	6–7^{(6–8)}, 6–2, 6–2
Tokyo	(Poland) Agnieszka Radwańska	(Switzerland) Belinda Bencic	6–2, 6–2
Moscow	(Russia) Svetlana Kuznetsova	(Russia) Anastasia Pavlyuchenkova	6–2, 6–1

=== 2016 ===
Tournament	Winner	Runner-up	Score
Premier Mandatory
Indian Wells	(Belarus) Victoria Azarenka	(United States) Serena Williams	6–4, 6–4
Miami	(Belarus) Victoria Azarenka	(Russia) Svetlana Kuznetsova	6–3, 6–2
Madrid	(Romania) Simona Halep	(Slovakia) Dominika Cibulková	6–2, 6–4
Beijing	(Poland) Agnieszka Radwańska	(United Kingdom) Johanna Konta	6–4, 6–2
Premier 5
Doha	(Spain) Carla Suárez Navarro	(Latvia) Jeļena Ostapenko	1–6, 6–4, 6–4
Rome	(United States) Serena Williams	(United States) Madison Keys	7–6^{(7–5)}, 6–3
Canada (Montreal)	(Romania) Simona Halep	(United States) Madison Keys	7–6^{(7–2)}, 6–3
Cincinnati	(Czech Republic) Karolína Plíšková	(Germany) Angelique Kerber	6–3, 6–1
Wuhan	(Czech Republic) Petra Kvitová	(Slovakia) Dominika Cibulková	6–1, 6–1
Premier
Brisbane	(Belarus) Victoria Azarenka	(Germany) Angelique Kerber	6–3, 6–1
Sydney	(Russia) Svetlana Kuznetsova	(Puerto Rico) Monica Puig	6–0, 6–2
St. Petersburg	(Italy) Roberta Vinci	(Switzerland) Belinda Bencic	6–4, 6–3
Dubai	(Italy) Sara Errani	(Czech Republic) Barbora Strýcová	6–0, 6–2
Charleston	(United States) Sloane Stephens	(Russia) Elena Vesnina	7–6^{(7–4)}, 6–2
Stuttgart	(Germany) Angelique Kerber	(Germany) Laura Siegemund	6–4, 6–0
Birmingham	(United States) Madison Keys	(Czech Republic) Barbora Strýcová	6–3, 6–4
Eastbourne	(Slovakia) Dominika Cibulková	(Czech Republic) Karolína Plíšková	7–5, 6–3
Stanford	(United Kingdom) Johanna Konta	(United States) Venus Williams	7–5, 5–7, 6–2
New Haven	(Poland) Agnieszka Radwańska	(Ukraine) Elina Svitolina	6–1, 7–6^{(7–3)}
Tokyo	(Denmark) Caroline Wozniacki	(Japan) Naomi Osaka	7–5, 6–3
Moscow	(Russia) Svetlana Kuznetsova	(Australia) Daria Gavrilova	6–2, 6–1

=== 2017 ===
Tournament	Winner	Runner-up	Score
Premier Mandatory
Indian Wells	(Russia) Elena Vesnina	(Russia) Svetlana Kuznetsova	6–7^{(6–8)}, 7–5, 6–4
Miami	(United Kingdom) Johanna Konta	(Denmark) Caroline Wozniacki	6–4, 6–3
Madrid	(Romania) Simona Halep	(France) Kristina Mladenovic	7–5, 6–7^{(5–7)}, 6–2
Beijing	(France) Caroline Garcia	(Romania) Simona Halep	6–4, 7–6^{(7–3)}
Premier 5
Dubai	(Ukraine) Elina Svitolina	(Denmark) Caroline Wozniacki	6–4, 6–2
Rome	(Ukraine) Elina Svitolina	(Romania) Simona Halep	4–6, 7–5, 6–1
Canada (Toronto)	(Ukraine) Elina Svitolina	(Denmark) Caroline Wozniacki	6–4, 6–0
Cincinnati	(Spain) Garbiñe Muguruza	(Romania) Simona Halep	6–1, 6–0
Wuhan	(France) Caroline Garcia	(Australia) Ashleigh Barty	6–7^{(3–7)}, 7–6^{(7–4)}, 6–2
Premier
Brisbane	(Czech Republic) Karolína Plíšková	(France) Alizé Cornet	6–0, 6–3
Sydney	(United Kingdom) Johanna Konta	(Poland) Agnieszka Radwańska	6–4, 6–2
St. Petersburg	(France) Kristina Mladenovic	(Kazakhstan) Yulia Putintseva	6–2, 6–7^{(3–7)}, 6–4
Doha	(Czech Republic) Karolína Plíšková	(Denmark) Caroline Wozniacki	6–3, 6–4
Charleston	(Russia) Daria Kasatkina	(Latvia) Jeļena Ostapenko	6–3, 6–1
Stuttgart	(Germany) Laura Siegemund	(France) Kristina Mladenovic	6–1, 2–6, 7–6^{(7–5)}
Birmingham	(Czech Republic) Petra Kvitová	(Australia) Ashleigh Barty	4–6, 6–3, 6–2
Eastbourne	(Czech Republic) Karolína Plíšková	(Denmark) Caroline Wozniacki	6–4, 6–4
Stanford	(United States) Madison Keys	(United States) CoCo Vandeweghe	7–6^{(7–4)}, 6–4
New Haven	(Australia) Daria Gavrilova	(Slovakia) Dominika Cibulková	4–6, 6–3, 6–4
Tokyo	(Denmark) Caroline Wozniacki	(Russia) Anastasia Pavlyuchenkova	6–0, 7–5
Moscow	(Germany) Julia Görges	(Russia) Daria Kasatkina	6–1, 6–2

=== 2018 ===
Tournament	Winner	Runner-up	Score
Premier Mandatory
Indian Wells	(Japan) Naomi Osaka	(Russia) Daria Kasatkina	6–3, 6–2
Miami	(United States) Sloane Stephens	(Latvia) Jeļena Ostapenko	7–6^{(7–5)}, 6–1
Madrid	(Czech Republic) Petra Kvitová	(Netherlands) Kiki Bertens	7–6^{(8–6)}, 4–6, 6–3
Beijing	(Denmark) Caroline Wozniacki	(Latvia) Anastasija Sevastova	6–3, 6–3
Premier 5
Doha	(Czech Republic) Petra Kvitová	(Spain) Garbiñe Muguruza	3–6, 6–3, 6–4
Rome	(Ukraine) Elina Svitolina	(Romania) Simona Halep	6–0, 6–4
Canada (Montreal)	(Romania) Simona Halep	(United States) Sloane Stephens	7–6^{(8–6)}, 3–6, 6–4
Cincinnati	(Netherlands) Kiki Bertens	(Romania) Simona Halep	2–6, 7–6^{(8–6)}, 6–2
Wuhan	(Belarus) Aryna Sabalenka	(Estonia) Anett Kontaveit	6–3, 6–3
Premier
Brisbane	(Ukraine) Elina Svitolina	(Belarus) Aliaksandra Sasnovich	6–2, 6–1
Sydney	(Germany) Angelique Kerber	(Australia) Ashleigh Barty	6–4, 6–4
St. Petersburg	(Czech Republic) Petra Kvitová	(France) Kristina Mladenovic	6–1, 6–2
Dubai	(Ukraine) Elina Svitolina	(Russia) Daria Kasatkina	6–4, 6–0
Charleston	(Netherlands) Kiki Bertens	(Germany) Julia Görges	6–2, 6–1
Stuttgart	(Czech Republic) Karolína Plíšková	(United States) CoCo Vandeweghe	7–6^{(7–2)}, 6–4
Birmingham	(Czech Republic) Petra Kvitová	(Slovakia) Magdaléna Rybáriková	4–6, 6–1, 6–2
Eastbourne	(Denmark) Caroline Wozniacki	(Belarus) Aryna Sabalenka	7–5, 7–6^{(7–5)}
San Jose	(Romania) Mihaela Buzărnescu	(Greece) Maria Sakkari	6–1, 6–0
New Haven	(Belarus) Aryna Sabalenka	(Spain) Carla Suárez Navarro	6–1, 6–4
Tokyo	(Czech Republic) Karolína Plíšková	(Japan) Naomi Osaka	6–4, 6–4
Moscow	(Russia) Daria Kasatkina	(Tunisia) Ons Jabeur	2–6, 7–6^{(7–3)}, 6–4

=== 2019 ===
Tournament	Winner	Runner-up	Score
Premier Mandatory
Indian Wells	(Canada) Bianca Andreescu	(Germany) Angelique Kerber	6–4, 3–6, 6–4
Miami	(Australia) Ashleigh Barty	(Czech Republic) Karolína Plíšková	7–6^{(7–1)}, 6–3
Madrid	(Netherlands) Kiki Bertens	(Romania) Simona Halep	6–4, 6–4
Beijing	(Japan) Naomi Osaka	(Australia) Ashleigh Barty	3–6, 6–3, 6–2
Premier 5
Dubai	(Switzerland) Belinda Bencic	(Czech Republic) Petra Kvitová	6–3, 1–6, 6–2
Rome	(Czech Republic) Karolína Plíšková	(United Kingdom) Johanna Konta	6–3, 6–4
Canada (Toronto)	(Canada) Bianca Andreescu	(United States) Serena Williams	3–1 ret.
Cincinnati	(United States) Madison Keys	(Russia) Svetlana Kuznetsova	7–5, 7–6^{(7–5)}
Wuhan	(Belarus) Aryna Sabalenka	(United States) Alison Riske	6–3, 3–6, 6–1
Premier
Brisbane	(Czech Republic) Karolína Plíšková	(Ukraine) Lesia Tsurenko	4–6, 7–5, 6–2
Sydney	(Czech Republic) Petra Kvitová	(Australia) Ashleigh Barty	1–6, 7–5, 7–6^{(7–3)}
St. Petersburg	(Netherlands) Kiki Bertens	(Croatia) Donna Vekić	7–6^{(7–2)}, 6–4
Doha	(Belgium) Elise Mertens	(Romania) Simona Halep	3–6, 6–4, 6–3
Charleston	(United States) Madison Keys	(Denmark) Caroline Wozniacki	7–6^{(7–5)}, 6–3
Stuttgart	(Czech Republic) Petra Kvitová	(Estonia) Anett Kontaveit	6–3, 7–6^{(7–2)}
Birmingham	(Australia) Ashleigh Barty	(Germany) Julia Görges	6–3, 7–5
Eastbourne	(Czech Republic) Karolína Plíšková	(Germany) Angelique Kerber	6–1, 6–4
San Jose	(China) Zheng Saisai	(Belarus) Aryna Sabalenka	6–3, 7–6^{(7–3)}
Zhengzhou	(Czech Republic) Karolína Plíšková	(Croatia) Petra Martić	6–3, 6–2
Osaka	(Japan) Naomi Osaka	(Russia) Anastasia Pavlyuchenkova	6–2, 6–3
Moscow	(Switzerland) Belinda Bencic	(Russia) Anastasia Pavlyuchenkova	3–6, 6–1, 6–1

=== 2020 ===
Tournament	Winner	Runner-up	Score
Premier Mandatory
Indian Wells	All tournaments cancelled due to the COVID-19 pandemic		
Miami	All tournaments cancelled due to the COVID-19 pandemic		
Madrid	All tournaments cancelled due to the COVID-19 pandemic		
Beijing	All tournaments cancelled due to the COVID-19 pandemic		
Premier 5
Doha	(Belarus) Aryna Sabalenka	(Czech Republic) Petra Kvitová	6–3, 6–3
Canada (Montreal)	Tournament cancelled due to the COVID-19 pandemic		
New York	(Belarus) Victoria Azarenka	(Japan) Naomi Osaka	walkover
Rome	(Romania) Simona Halep	(Czech Republic) Karolína Plíšková	6–0, 2–1 ret.
Wuhan	Tournament cancelled due to the COVID-19 pandemic		
Premier
Brisbane	(Czech Republic) Karolína Plíšková	(United States) Madison Keys	6–4, 4–6, 7–5
Adelaide	(Australia) Ashleigh Barty	(Ukraine) Dayana Yastremska	6–2, 7–5
St. Petersburg	(Netherlands) Kiki Bertens	(Kazakhstan) Elena Rybakina	6–1, 6–3
Dubai	(Romania) Simona Halep	(Kazakhstan) Elena Rybakina	3–6, 6–3, 7–6^{(7–5)}
Charleston	tournaments cancelled due to the COVID-19 pandemic		
Stuttgart	tournaments cancelled due to the COVID-19 pandemic		
Berlin	tournaments cancelled due to the COVID-19 pandemic		
Eastbourne	tournaments cancelled due to the COVID-19 pandemic		
San Jose	tournaments cancelled due to the COVID-19 pandemic		
Zhengzhou	tournaments cancelled due to the COVID-19 pandemic		
Tokyo	tournaments cancelled due to the COVID-19 pandemic		
Ostrava	(Belarus) Aryna Sabalenka	(Belarus) Victoria Azarenka	6–2, 6–2
Moscow	tournament cancelled due to the COVID-19 pandemic		

== Singles champions ==
=== Premier Mandatory ===
	Indian Wells	Miami	Madrid	Beijing
2009	(Russia) Vera Zvonareva (1/1)	(Belarus) Victoria Azarenka (1/6)	(Russia) Dinara Safina (1/1)	(Russia) Svetlana Kuznetsova (1/1)
2010	(Serbia) Jelena Janković (1/1)	(Belgium) Kim Clijsters (1/1)	(France) Aravane Rezaï (1/1)	(Denmark) Caroline Wozniacki (1/3)
2011	(Denmark) Caroline Wozniacki (2/3)	(Belarus) Victoria Azarenka (2/6)	(Czech Republic) Petra Kvitová (1/3)	(Poland) Agnieszka Radwańska (1/3)
2012	(Belarus) Victoria Azarenka (3/6)	(Poland) Agnieszka Radwańska (2/3)	(United States) Serena Williams (1/6)	(Belarus) Victoria Azarenka (4/6)
2013	(Russia) Maria Sharapova (1/3)	(United States) Serena Williams (2/6)	(United States) Serena Williams (3/6)	(United States) Serena Williams (4/6)
2014	(Italy) Flavia Pennetta (1/1)	(United States) Serena Williams (5/6)	(Russia) Maria Sharapova (2/3)	(Russia) Maria Sharapova (3/3)
2015	(Romania) Simona Halep (1/3)	(United States) Serena Williams (6/6)	(Czech Republic) Petra Kvitová (2/3)	(Spain) Garbiñe Muguruza (1/1)
2016	(Belarus) Victoria Azarenka (5/6)	(Belarus) Victoria Azarenka (6/6)	(Romania) Simona Halep (2/3)	(Poland) Agnieszka Radwańska (3/3)
2017	(Russia) Elena Vesnina (1/1)	(United Kingdom) Johanna Konta (1/1)	(Romania) Simona Halep (3/3)	(France) Caroline Garcia (1/1)
2018	(Japan) Naomi Osaka (1/2)	(United States) Sloane Stephens (1/1)	(Czech Republic) Petra Kvitová (3/3)	(Denmark) Caroline Wozniacki (3/3)
2019	(Canada) Bianca Andreescu (1/1)	(Australia) Ashleigh Barty (1/1)	(Netherlands) Kiki Bertens (1/1)	(Japan) Naomi Osaka (2/2)
2020	Cancelled			

=== Premier 5 ===
	Dubai	Doha	Rome	Toronto/ Montreal	Cincinnati	Tokyo	Wuhan
2009	(United States) Venus Williams (1/3)	Not an event	(Russia) Dinara Safina (1/1)	(Russia) Elena Dementieva (1/1)	(Serbia) Jelena Janković (1/1)	(Russia) Maria Sharapova (1/5)	Not an event
2010	(United States) Venus Williams (2/3)	Not an event	(Spain) MJ Martínez Sánchez (1/1)	(Denmark) Caroline Wozniacki (1/3)	(Belgium) Kim Clijsters (1/1)	(Denmark) Caroline Wozniacki (2/3)	Not an event
2011	(Denmark) Caroline Wozniacki (3/3)	Premier	(Russia) Maria Sharapova (2/5)	(United States) Serena Williams (1/7)	(Russia) Maria Sharapova (3/5)	(Poland) Agnieszka Radwańska (1/2)	Not an event
2012	Premier	(Belarus) Victoria Azarenka (1/4)	(Russia) Maria Sharapova (4/5)	(Czech Republic) Petra Kvitová (1/5)	(China) Li Na (1/1)	(Russia) Nadia Petrova (1/1)	Not an event
2013	Premier	(Belarus) Victoria Azarenka (2/4)	(United States) Serena Williams (2/7)	(United States) Serena Williams (3/7)	(Belarus) Victoria Azarenka (3/4)	(Czech Republic) Petra Kvitová (2/5)	Not an event
2014	Premier	(Romania) Simona Halep (1/5)	(United States) Serena Williams (4/7)	(Poland) Agnieszka Radwańska (2/2)	(United States) Serena Williams (5/7)	Premier	(Czech Republic) Petra Kvitová (3/5)
2015	(Romania) Simona Halep (2/5)	Premier	(Russia) Maria Sharapova (5/5)	(Switzerland) Belinda Bencic (1/2)	(United States) Serena Williams (6/7)	Premier	(United States) Venus Williams (3/3)
2016	Premier	(Spain) Carla Suárez Navarro (1/1)	(United States) Serena Williams (7/7)	(Romania) Simona Halep (3/5)	(Czech Republic) Karolína Plíšková (1/2)	Premier	(Czech Republic) Petra Kvitová (4/5)
2017	(Ukraine) Elina Svitolina (1/4)	Premier	(Ukraine) Elina Svitolina (2/4)	(Ukraine) Elina Svitolina (3/4)	(Spain) Garbiñe Muguruza (1/1)	Premier	(France) Caroline Garcia (1/1)
2018	Premier	(Czech Republic) Petra Kvitová (5/5)	(Ukraine) Elina Svitolina (4/4)	(Romania) Simona Halep (4/5)	(Netherlands) Kiki Bertens (1/1)	Premier	(Belarus) Aryna Sabalenka (1/3)
2019	(Switzerland) Belinda Bencic (2/2)	Premier	(Czech Republic) Karolína Plíšková (2/2)	(Canada) Bianca Andreescu (1/1)	(United States) Madison Keys (1/1)	Premier	(Belarus) Aryna Sabalenka (2/3)
2020	Premier	(Belarus) Aryna Sabalenka (3/3)	(Romania) Simona Halep (5/5)	Cancelled	(Belarus) Victoria Azarenka (4/4)	Premier	cancelled

=== Premier ===
	Brisbane	Sydney	Adelaide	Paris	Antwerp	St. Petersburg	Doha	Dubai	Charleston	Stuttgart	Warsaw	Brussels	Birmingham	Berlin	Eastbourne	Stanford/San Jose	Los Angeles	San Diego /Carlsbad	New Haven	Zhengzhou	Tokyo	Ostrava	Chicago	Moscow
2009	WTA International	(Russia) Elena Dementieva (1/3)	Not an event	(France) Amélie Mauresmo (1/1)	Exhibition events	Not an event	Not an event	Premier 5	(Germany) Sabine Lisicki (1/1)	(Russia) Svetlana Kuznetsova (1/5)	(Romania) Alexandra Dulgheru (1/2)	Not an event	WTA International	Not an event	(Denmark) Caroline Wozniacki (1/10)	(France) Marion Bartoli (1/2)	(Italy) Flavia Pennetta (1/1)	Not an event	(Denmark) Caroline Wozniacki (2/10)	Not an event	Premier 5	Not an event	Not an event	(Italy) Francesca Schiavone (1/1)
2010	WTA International	(Russia) Elena Dementieva (2/3)	Not an event	(Russia) Elena Dementieva (3/3)	Exhibition events	Not an event	Not an event	Premier 5	(Australia) Samantha Stosur (1/2)	(Belgium) Justine Henin (1/1)	(Romania) Alexandra Dulgheru (2/2)	Not an event	WTA International	Not an event	(Russia) Ekaterina Makarova (1/1)	(Belarus) Victoria Azarenka (1/4)	Not an event	(Russia) Svetlana Kuznetsova (2/5)	(Denmark) Caroline Wozniacki (3/10)	Not an event	Premier 5	Not an event	Not an event	(Belarus) Victoria Azarenka (2/4)
2011	WTA International	(China) Li Na (1/1)	Not an event	(Czech Republic) Petra Kvitová (1/11)	Exhibition events	Not an event	(Russia) Vera Zvonareva (1/1)	Premier 5	(Denmark) Caroline Wozniacki (4/10)	(Germany) Julia Görges (1/2)	Not an event	(Denmark) Caroline Wozniacki (5/10)	WTA International	Not an event	(France) Marion Bartoli (2/2)	(United States) Serena Williams (1/7)	Not an event	(Poland) Agnieszka Radwańska (1/6)	(Denmark) Caroline Wozniacki (6/10)	Not an event	Premier 5	Not an event	Not an event	(Slovakia) Dominika Cibulková (1/4)
2012	(Estonia) Kaia Kanepi (1/2)	(Belarus) Victoria Azarenka (3/4)	Not an event	(Germany) Angelique Kerber (1/7)	Exhibition events	Not an event	Premier 5	(Poland) Agnieszka Radwańska (2/6)	(United States) Serena Williams (2/7)	(Russia) Maria Sharapova (1/4)	Not an event	(Poland) Agnieszka Radwańska (3/6)	WTA International	Not an event	(Austria) Tamira Paszek (1/1)	(United States) Serena Williams (3/7)	Not an event	(Slovakia) Dominika Cibulková (2/4)	(Czech Republic) Petra Kvitová (2/11)	Not an event	Premier 5	Not an event	Not an event	(Denmark) Caroline Wozniacki (7/10)
2013	(United States) Serena Williams (4/7)	(Poland) Agnieszka Radwańska (4/6)	Not an event	(Germany) Mona Barthel (1/1)	Exhibition events	Not an event	Premier 5	(Czech Republic) Petra Kvitová (3/11)	(United States) Serena Williams (5/7)	(Russia) Maria Sharapova (2/4)	Not an event	(Estonia) Kaia Kanepi (2/2)	WTA International	Not an event	(Russia) Elena Vesnina (1/1)	(Slovakia) Dominika Cibulková (3/4)	Not an event	(Australia) Samantha Stosur (2/2)	(Romania) Simona Halep (1/3)	Not an event	Premier 5	Not an event	Not an event	(Romania) Simona Halep (2/3)
2014	(United States) Serena Williams (6/7)	(Bulgaria) Tsvetana Pironkova (1/1)	Not an event	(Russia) Anastasia Pavlyuchenkova (1/2)	Exhibition events	Not an event	Premier 5	(United States) Venus Williams (1/1)	(Germany) Andrea Petkovic (1/2)	(Russia) Maria Sharapova (3/4)	Not an event	Not an event	(Serbia) Ana Ivanovic (1/2)	Not an event	(United States) Madison Keys (1/4)	(United States) Serena Williams (7/7)	Not an event	Not an event	(Czech Republic) Petra Kvitová (4/11)	ITF Event	(Serbia) Ana Ivanovic (2/2)	Not an event	Not an event	(Russia) Anastasia Pavlyuchenkova (2/2)
2015	(Russia) Maria Sharapova (4/4)	(Czech Republic) Petra Kvitová (5/11)	Not an event	Not an event	(Germany) Andrea Petkovic (2/2)	ITF Event	(Czech Republic) Lucie Šafářová (1/1)	Premier 5	(Germany) Angelique Kerber (2/7)	(Germany) Angelique Kerber (3/7)	Not an event	Not an event	(Germany) Angelique Kerber (4/7)	Not an event	(Switzerland) Belinda Bencic (1/2)	(Germany) Angelique Kerber (5/7)	Not an event	WTA 125k	(Czech Republic) Petra Kvitová (6/11)	ITF Event	(Poland) Agnieszka Radwańska (5/6)	Not an event	Not an event	(Russia) Svetlana Kuznetsova (3/5)
2016	(Belarus) Victoria Azarenka (4/4)	(Russia) Svetlana Kuznetsova (4/5)	Not an event	Not an event	Not an event	(Italy) Roberta Vinci (1/1)	Premier 5	(Italy) Sara Errani (1/1)	(United States) Sloane Stephens (1/1)	(Germany) Angelique Kerber (6/7)	Not an event	Not an event	(United States) Madison Keys (2/4)	Not an event	(Slovakia) Dominika Cibulková (4/4)	(United Kingdom) Johanna Konta (1/2)	Not an event	Not an event	(Poland) Agnieszka Radwańska (6/6)	ITF Event	(Denmark) Caroline Wozniacki (8/10)	Not an event	Not an event	(Russia) Svetlana Kuznetsova (5/5)
2017	(Czech Republic) Karolína Plíšková (1/9)	(United Kingdom) Johanna Konta (2/2)	Not an event	Not an event	Not an event	(France) Kristina Mladenovic (1/1)	(Czech Republic) Karolína Plíšková (2/9)	Premier 5	(Russia) Daria Kasatkina (1/4)	(Germany) Laura Siegemund (1/1)	Not an event	Not an event	(Czech Republic) Petra Kvitová (7/11)	Not an event	(Czech Republic) Karolína Plíšková (3/9)	(United States) Madison Keys (3/4)	Not an event	Not an event	(Australia) Daria Gavrilova (1/1)	WTA 125k	(Denmark) Caroline Wozniacki (9/10)	Not an event	Not an event	(Germany) Julia Görges (2/2)
2018	(Ukraine) Elina Svitolina (1/2)	(Germany) Angelique Kerber (7/7)	Not an event	Not an event	Not an event	(Czech Republic) Petra Kvitová (8/11)	Premier 5	(Ukraine) Elina Svitolina (2/2)	(Netherlands) Kiki Bertens (1/3)	(Czech Republic) Karolína Plíšková (4/9)	Not an event	Not an event	(Czech Republic) Petra Kvitová (9/11)	Not an event	(Denmark) Caroline Wozniacki (10/10)	(Romania) Mihaela Buzărnescu (1/1)	Not an event	Not an event	(Belarus) Aryna Sabalenka (1/1)	WTA 125k	(Czech Republic) Karolína Plíšková (5/9)	Not an event	Not an event	(Russia) Daria Kasatkina (2/4)
2019	(Czech Republic) Karolína Plíšková (6/9)	(Czech Republic) Petra Kvitová (10/11)	Not an event	Not an event	Not an event	(Netherlands) Kiki Bertens (2/3)	(Belgium) Elise Mertens (1/1)	Premier 5	(United States) Madison Keys (4/4)	(Czech Republic) Petra Kvitová (11/11)	Not an event	(Australia) Ashleigh Barty (1/2)	(Czech Republic) Karolína Plíšková (7/9)	Not an event	(China) Zheng Saisai (1/1)	Not an event	Not an event	Not an event	Not an event	(Czech Republic) Karolína Plíšková (8/9)	(Japan) Naomi Osaka (1/1)	Not an event	Not an event	(Switzerland) Belinda Bencic (2/2)
2020	(Czech Republic) Karolína Plíšková (9/9)	Not an event	(Australia) Ashleigh Barty (2/2)	Not an event	Not an event	(Netherlands) Kiki Bertens (3/3)	Premier 5	(Romania) Simona Halep (3/3)	Cancelled	Cancelled	Not an event	WTA International	Cancelled	Cancelled	Cancelled	Not an event	Not an event	Not an event	Not an event	Cancelled	Cancelled	(Belarus) Aryna Sabalenka (2/2)	Not an event	Cancelled

== Singles titles ==
These tables present the number of singles WTA Premier titles won by each player and each nation since 2009.

=== Titles won by player ===
Total	Player	PM	P5	P
20	Serena Williams (USA)	● ● ● ● ● ● (6)	● ● ● ● ● ● ● (7)	● ● ● ● ● ● ● (7)
19	Petra Kvitová (CZE)	● ● ● (3)	● ● ● ● ● (5)	● ● ● ● ● ● ● ● ● ● ● (11)
16	Caroline Wozniacki (DEN)	● ● ● (3)	● ● ● (3)	● ● ● ● ● ● ● ● ● ● (10)
14	Victoria Azarenka (BLR)	● ● ● ● ● ● (6)	● ● ● ● (4)	● ● ● ● (4)
12	Maria Sharapova (RUS)	● ● ● (3)	● ● ● ● ● (5)	● ● ● ● (4)
11	Simona Halep (ROU)	● ● ● (3)	● ● ● ● ● (5)	● ● ● (3)
11	Agnieszka Radwańska (POL)	● ● ● (3)	● ● (2)	● ● ● ● ● ● (6)
11	Karolína Plíšková (CZE)		● ● (2)	● ● ● ● ● ● ● ● ● (9)
7	Angelique Kerber (GER)			● ● ● ● ● ● ● (7)
6	Svetlana Kuznetsova (RUS)	● (1)		● ● ● ● ● (5)
6	Elina Svitolina (UKR)		● ● ● ● (4)	● ● (2)
5	Kiki Bertens (NED)	● (1)	● (1)	● ● ● (3)
5	Aryna Sabalenka (BLR)		● ● ● (3)	● ● (2)
5	Madison Keys (USA)		● (1)	● ● ● ● (4)
4	Venus Williams (USA)		● ● ● (3)	● (1)
4	Belinda Bencic (SUI)		● ● (2)	● ● (2)
4	Elena Dementieva (RUS)		● (1)	● ● ● (3)
4	Dominika Cibulková (SVK)			● ● ● ● (4)
3	Naomi Osaka (JPN)	● ● (2)		● (1)
3	Ashleigh Barty (AUS)	● (1)		● ● (2)
3	Johanna Konta (GBR)	● (1)		● ● (2)
2	Kim Clijsters (BEL)	● (1)	● (1)	
2	Bianca Andreescu (CAN)	● (1)	● (1)	
2	Caroline Garcia (FRA)	● (1)	● (1)	
2	Jelena Janković (SRB)	● (1)	● (1)	
2	Garbiñe Muguruza (ESP)	● (1)	● (1)	
2	Dinara Safina (RUS)	● (1)	● (1)	
2	Flavia Pennetta (ITA)	● (1)		● (1)
2	Sloane Stephens (USA)	● (1)		● (1)
2	Elena Vesnina (RUS)	● (1)		● (1)
2	Vera Zvonareva (RUS)	● (1)		● (1)
2	Li Na (CHN)		● (1)	● (1)
2	Marion Bartoli (FRA)			● ● (2)
2	Alexandra Dulgheru (ROU)			● ● (2)
2	Julia Görges (GER)			● ● (2)
2	Ana Ivanovic (SRB)			● ● (2)
2	Kaia Kanepi (EST)			● ● (2)
2	Daria Kasatkina (RUS)			● ● (2)
2	Anastasia Pavlyuchenkova (RUS)			● ● (2)
2	Andrea Petkovic (GER)			● ● (2)
2	Samantha Stosur (AUS)			● ● (2)
1	Aravane Rezaï (FRA)	● (1)		
1	María José Martínez Sánchez (ESP)		● (1)	
1	Nadia Petrova (RUS)		● (1)	
1	Carla Suárez Navarro (ESP)		● (1)	
1	Mona Barthel (GER)			● (1)
1	Mihaela Buzărnescu (ROU)			● (1)
1	Sara Errani (ITA)			● (1)
1	Daria Gavrilova (AUS)			● (1)
1	Justine Henin (BEL)			● (1)
1	Sabine Lisicki (GER)			● (1)
1	Ekaterina Makarova (RUS)			● (1)
1	Amélie Mauresmo (FRA)			● (1)
1	Elise Mertens (BEL)			● (1)
1	Kristina Mladenovic (FRA)			● (1)
1	Tamira Paszek (AUT)			● (1)
1	Tsvetana Pironkova (BUL)			● (1)
1	Lucie Šafářová (CZE)			● (1)
1	Francesca Schiavone (ITA)			● (1)
1	Laura Siegemund (GER)			● (1)
1	Roberta Vinci (ITA)			● (1)
1	Zheng Saisai (CHN)			● (1)

=== Titles won by nation ===
Total	Country	PM	P5	P
34	Russia	● ● ● ● ● ● ●	● ● ● ● ● ● ● ●	● ● ● ● ● ● ● ● ● ● ● ● ● ● ● ● ● ● ●
31	United States	● ● ● ● ● ● ●	● ● ● ● ● ● ● ● ● ●	● ● ● ● ● ● ● ● ● ● ● ● ●
31	Czech Republic	● ● ●	● ● ● ● ● ● ●	● ● ● ● ● ● ● ● ● ● ● ● ● ● ● ● ● ● ● ● ●
19	Belarus	● ● ● ● ● ●	● ● ● ● ● ● ●	● ● ● ● ● ●
16	Denmark	● ● ●	● ● ●	● ● ● ● ● ● ● ● ● ●
14	Romania	● ● ●	● ● ● ● ●	● ● ● ● ● ●
14	Germany			● ● ● ● ● ● ● ● ● ● ● ● ● ●
11	Poland	● ● ●	● ●	● ● ● ● ● ●
7	France	● ●	●	● ● ● ●
6	Australia	●		● ● ● ● ●
6	Ukraine		● ● ● ●	● ●
5	Netherlands	●	●	● ● ●
5	Italy	●		● ● ● ●
4	Belgium	●	●	● ●
4	Slovakia			● ● ● ●
4	Spain	●	● ● ●	
4	Switzerland		● ●	● ●
4	Serbia	●	●	● ●
3	Japan	● ●		●
3	Great Britain	●		● ●
3	China		●	● ●
2	Canada	●	●	
2	Estonia			● ●
1	Austria			●
1	Bulgaria			●

== See also ==
- WTA 1000 tournaments
- WTA 500 tournaments
- WTA 250 tournaments
- ATP World Tour Masters 1000
