= 2013 WTA Premier tournaments =

The 2013 WTA Premier tournaments are 21 of the tennis tournaments on the 2013 WTA Tour. The WTA Tour is the elite tour for women's professional tennis. The WTA Premier tournaments rank below the Grand Slam events and above the WTA International tournaments. They are divided into three levels: Premier Mandatory (Indian Wells, Miami, Madrid and Beijing), Premier 5 (Doha, Rome, Canada, Cincinnati and Tokyo), and Premier (12 tournaments in Europe, United States and Australia).

== Schedule ==
=== Premier ===
Week of	Tournament	Champions	Runners-up	Semifinalists	Quarterfinalists
31 December	Brisbane International; Brisbane, Australia	(United States) Serena Williams; 6–2, 6–1	(Russia) Anastasia Pavlyuchenkova	(Belarus) Victoria Azarenka (Ukraine) Lesia Tsurenko	(Kazakhstan) Ksenia Pervak (United States) Sloane Stephens (Germany) Angelique Kerber (Slovakia) Daniela Hantuchová
31 December	Brisbane International; Brisbane, Australia	(United States) Bethanie Mattek-Sands (India) Sania Mirza; 4–6, 6–4, [10–7]	(Germany) Anna-Lena Grönefeld (Czech Republic) Květa Peschke	(Belarus) Victoria Azarenka (Ukraine) Lesia Tsurenko	(Kazakhstan) Ksenia Pervak (United States) Sloane Stephens (Germany) Angelique Kerber (Slovakia) Daniela Hantuchová
7 January	Apia International Sydney; Sydney, Australia	(Poland) Agnieszka Radwańska; 6–0, 6–0	(Slovakia) Dominika Cibulková	(China) Li Na (Germany) Angelique Kerber	(Italy) Roberta Vinci (United States) Madison Keys (Italy) Sara Errani (Russia) Svetlana Kuznetsova
7 January	Apia International Sydney; Sydney, Australia	(Russia) Nadia Petrova (Slovenia) Katarina Srebotnik; 6-3, 6-4	(Italy) Sara Errani (Italy) Roberta Vinci	(China) Li Na (Germany) Angelique Kerber	(Italy) Roberta Vinci (United States) Madison Keys (Italy) Sara Errani (Russia) Svetlana Kuznetsova
28 January	Open GDF Suez; Paris, France	(Germany) Mona Barthel; 7–5, 7–6^{(7–4)}	(Italy) Sara Errani	(Netherlands) Kiki Bertens (France) Kristina Mladenovic	(Spain) Carla Suárez Navarro (Czech Republic) Lucie Šafářová (France) Marion Bartoli (Czech Republic) Petra Kvitová
28 January	Open GDF Suez; Paris, France	(Italy) Sara Errani (Italy) Roberta Vinci; 6–1, 6–1	(Czech Republic) Andrea Hlaváčková (United States) Liezel Huber	(Netherlands) Kiki Bertens (France) Kristina Mladenovic	(Spain) Carla Suárez Navarro (Czech Republic) Lucie Šafářová (France) Marion Bartoli (Czech Republic) Petra Kvitová
18 February	Barclays Dubai Tennis; Championships; Dubai, UAE	(Czech Republic) Petra Kvitová; 6–2, 1–6, 6–1	(Italy) Sara Errani	(Italy) Roberta Vinci (Denmark) Caroline Wozniacki	(Russia) Nadia Petrova (Australia) Samantha Stosur (Poland) Agnieszka Radwańska (France) Marion Bartoli
18 February	Barclays Dubai Tennis; Championships; Dubai, UAE	(United States) Bethanie Mattek-Sands (India) Sania Mirza; 6–4, 2–6, [10–7]	(Russia) Nadia Petrova (Slovenia) Katarina Srebotnik	(Italy) Roberta Vinci (Denmark) Caroline Wozniacki	(Russia) Nadia Petrova (Australia) Samantha Stosur (Poland) Agnieszka Radwańska (France) Marion Bartoli
1 April	Family Circle Cup; Charleston, USA	(United States) Serena Williams; 3–6, 6–0, 6–2	(Serbia) Jelena Janković	(United States) Venus Williams (Switzerland) Stefanie Vögele	(Czech Republic) Lucie Šafářová (United States) Madison Keys (Canada) Eugenie Bouchard (Denmark) Caroline Wozniacki
1 April	Family Circle Cup; Charleston, USA	(France) Kristina Mladenovic (Czech Republic) Lucie Šafářová; 6–3, 7–6^{(8–6)}	(Czech Republic) Andrea Hlaváčková (United States) Liezel Huber	(United States) Venus Williams (Switzerland) Stefanie Vögele	(Czech Republic) Lucie Šafářová (United States) Madison Keys (Canada) Eugenie Bouchard (Denmark) Caroline Wozniacki
22 April	Porsche Tennis Grand Prix; Stuttgart, Germany	(Russia) Maria Sharapova; 6–4, 6–3	(China) Li Na	(Germany) Angelique Kerber (United States) Bethanie Mattek-Sands	(Serbia) Ana Ivanovic (Kazakhstan) Yaroslava Shvedova (Germany) Sabine Lisicki (Czech Republic) Petra Kvitová
22 April	Porsche Tennis Grand Prix; Stuttgart, Germany	(Germany) Mona Barthel (Germany) Sabine Lisicki; 6–4, 7–5	(United States) Bethanie Mattek-Sands (India) Sania Mirza	(Germany) Angelique Kerber (United States) Bethanie Mattek-Sands	(Serbia) Ana Ivanovic (Kazakhstan) Yaroslava Shvedova (Germany) Sabine Lisicki (Czech Republic) Petra Kvitová
20 May	Brussels Open; Brussels, Belgium	(Estonia) Kaia Kanepi; 6–2, 7–5	(China) Peng Shuai	(Switzerland) Romina Oprandi (United States) Jamie Hampton	(China) Zheng Jie (United States) Sloane Stephens (United States) Varvara Lepchenko (Italy) Roberta Vinci
20 May	Brussels Open; Brussels, Belgium	(Germany) Anna-Lena Grönefeld (Czech Republic) Květa Peschke; 6–0, 6–3	(Canada) Gabriela Dabrowski (Israel) Shahar Pe'er	(Switzerland) Romina Oprandi (United States) Jamie Hampton	(China) Zheng Jie (United States) Sloane Stephens (United States) Varvara Lepchenko (Italy) Roberta Vinci
17 June	Aegon International; Eastbourne, UK	(Russia) Elena Vesnina; 6–2, 6–1	(United States) Jamie Hampton	(Denmark) Caroline Wozniacki (Belgium) Yanina Wickmayer	(Czech Republic) Lucie Šafářová (Russia) Ekaterina Makarova (Russia) Maria Kirilenko (China) Li Na
17 June	Aegon International; Eastbourne, UK	(Russia) Nadia Petrova (Slovenia) Katarina Srebotnik; 6–3, 6–3	(Romania) Monica Niculescu (Czech Republic) Klára Zakopalová	(Denmark) Caroline Wozniacki (Belgium) Yanina Wickmayer	(Czech Republic) Lucie Šafářová (Russia) Ekaterina Makarova (Russia) Maria Kirilenko (China) Li Na
22 July	Bank of the West Classic; Stanford, USA	(Slovakia) Dominika Cibulková; 3–6, 6–4, 6–4	(Poland) Agnieszka Radwańska	(United States) Jamie Hampton (Romania) Sorana Cîrstea	(United States) Varvara Lepchenko (Russia) Vera Dushevina (Poland) Urszula Radwańska (Belarus) Olga Govortsova
22 July	Bank of the West Classic; Stanford, USA	(United States) Raquel Kops-Jones (United States) Abigail Spears; 6–2, 7–6^{(7–4)}	(Germany) Julia Görges (Croatia) Darija Jurak	(United States) Jamie Hampton (Romania) Sorana Cîrstea	(United States) Varvara Lepchenko (Russia) Vera Dushevina (Poland) Urszula Radwańska (Belarus) Olga Govortsova
29 July	Southern California Open; Carlsbad, USA	(Australia) Samantha Stosur; 6–2, 6–3	(Belarus) Victoria Azarenka	(Serbia) Ana Ivanovic (France) Virginie Razzano	(Poland) Urszula Radwańska (Italy) Roberta Vinci (Czech Republic) Petra Kvitová (Poland) Agnieszka Radwańska
29 July	Southern California Open; Carlsbad, USA	(United States) Raquel Kops-Jones (United States) Abigail Spears; 6–4, 6–1	(Chinese Taipei) Chan Hao-ching (Slovakia) Janette Husárová	(Serbia) Ana Ivanovic (France) Virginie Razzano	(Poland) Urszula Radwańska (Italy) Roberta Vinci (Czech Republic) Petra Kvitová (Poland) Agnieszka Radwańska
19 August	New Haven Open at Yale; New Haven, USA	(Romania) Simona Halep; 6–2, 6–2	(Czech Republic) Petra Kvitová	(Denmark) Caroline Wozniacki (Czech Republic) Klára Zakopalová	(Russia) Ekaterina Makarova (United States) Sloane Stephens (Russia) Anastasia Pavlyuchenkova (Russia) Elena Vesnina
19 August	New Haven Open at Yale; New Haven, USA	(India) Sania Mirza (China) Zheng Jie; 6–3, 6–4	(Spain) Anabel Medina Garrigues (Slovenia) Katarina Srebotnik	(Denmark) Caroline Wozniacki (Czech Republic) Klára Zakopalová	(Russia) Ekaterina Makarova (United States) Sloane Stephens (Russia) Anastasia Pavlyuchenkova (Russia) Elena Vesnina
14 October	Kremlin Cup; Moscow, Russia	(Romania) Simona Halep; 7–6^{(7–1)}, 6–2	(Australia) Samantha Stosur	(Russia) Anastasia Pavlyuchenkova (Russia) Svetlana Kuznetsova	(Slovakia) Daniela Hantuchová (Russia) Alisa Kleybanova (Serbia) Ana Ivanovic (Italy) Roberta Vinci
14 October	Kremlin Cup; Moscow, Russia	(Australia) Samantha Stosur (Russia) Svetlana Kuznetsova; 6–1, 1–6, [10–8]	(Russia) Alla Kudryavtseva (Australia) Anastasia Rodionova	(Russia) Anastasia Pavlyuchenkova (Russia) Svetlana Kuznetsova	(Slovakia) Daniela Hantuchová (Russia) Alisa Kleybanova (Serbia) Ana Ivanovic (Italy) Roberta Vinci
