= 2010 WTA Premier tournaments =

The 2010 WTA Premier tournaments are 19 of the tennis tournaments on the 2010 WTA Tour. The WTA Tour is the elite tour for women's professional tennis. The WTA Premier tournaments rank below the Grand Slam events and above the WTA International tournaments. They are divided into three levels: Premier Mandatory (Indian Wells, Miami, Madrid and Beijing), Premier 5 (Dubai, Rome, Cincinnati, Canada and Tokyo), and Premier (10 tournaments in Europe, United States and Australia).

== Schedule ==
=== Premier ===
Week of	Tournament	Champions	Runners-up	Semifinalists	Quarterfinalists
10 January	Medibank International Sydney; Sydney, Australia	(Russia) Elena Dementieva; 6–3, 6–2	(United States) Serena Williams	(France) Aravane Rezaï (Belarus) Victoria Azarenka	(Russia) Vera Dushevina (Italy) Flavia Pennetta (Slovakia) Dominika Cibulková (Russia) Dinara Safina
10 January	Medibank International Sydney; Sydney, Australia	(Zimbabwe) Cara Black (United States) Liezel Huber; 6–1, 3–6, [10–3]	(Italy) Tathiana Garbin (Russia) Nadia Petrova	(France) Aravane Rezaï (Belarus) Victoria Azarenka	(Russia) Vera Dushevina (Italy) Flavia Pennetta (Slovakia) Dominika Cibulková (Russia) Dinara Safina
8 February	Open GDF Suez; Paris, France	(Russia) Elena Dementieva; 6–7^{(5–7)}, 6–1, 6–4	(Czech Republic) Lucie Šafářová	(United States) Melanie Oudin (Italy) Flavia Pennetta	(Germany) Andrea Petkovic (Hungary) Ágnes Szávay (Israel) Shahar Pe'er (Italy) Tathiana Garbin
8 February	Open GDF Suez; Paris, France	(Czech Republic) Iveta Benešová (Czech Republic) Barbora Záhlavová-Strýcová w/o	(Zimbabwe) Cara Black (United States) Liezel Huber	(United States) Melanie Oudin (Italy) Flavia Pennetta	(Germany) Andrea Petkovic (Hungary) Ágnes Szávay (Israel) Shahar Pe'er (Italy) Tathiana Garbin
12 April	Family Circle Cup; Charleston, USA	(Australia) Samantha Stosur; 6–0, 6–3	(Russia) Vera Zvonareva	(Denmark) Caroline Wozniacki (Slovakia) Daniela Hantuchová	(Russia) Nadia Petrova (United States) Melanie Oudin (China) Peng Shuai (Serbia) Jelena Janković
12 April	Family Circle Cup; Charleston, USA	(United States) Liezel Huber (Russia) Nadia Petrova; 6–3, 6–4	(United States) Vania King (Netherlands) Michaëlla Krajicek	(Denmark) Caroline Wozniacki (Slovakia) Daniela Hantuchová	(Russia) Nadia Petrova (United States) Melanie Oudin (China) Peng Shuai (Serbia) Jelena Janković
26 April	Porsche Tennis Grand Prix; Stuttgart, Germany	(Belgium) Justine Henin; 6–4, 2–6, 6–1	(Australia) Samantha Stosur	(Russia) Anna Lapushchenkova (Israel) Shahar Pe'er	(Czech Republic) Lucie Šafářová (China) Li Na (Serbia) Jelena Janković (Russia) Dinara Safina
26 April	Porsche Tennis Grand Prix; Stuttgart, Germany	(Argentina) Gisela Dulko (Italy) Flavia Pennetta; 3–6, 7–6^{3}, [10–5]	(Czech Republic) Květa Peschke (Slovenia) Katarina Srebotnik	(Russia) Anna Lapushchenkova (Israel) Shahar Pe'er	(Czech Republic) Lucie Šafářová (China) Li Na (Serbia) Jelena Janković (Russia) Dinara Safina
17 May	Warsaw Open; Warsaw, Poland	(Romania) Alexandra Dulgheru; 6–3, 6–4	(China) Zheng Jie	(Hungary) Gréta Arn (China) Li Na	(Denmark) Caroline Wozniacki (Ukraine) Alona Bondarenko (Italy) Sara Errani (Bulgaria) Tsvetana Pironkova
17 May	Warsaw Open; Warsaw, Poland	(Spain) Virginia Ruano Pascual (United States) Meghann Shaughnessy; 6–3, 6–4	(Zimbabwe) Cara Black (China) Yan Zi	(Hungary) Gréta Arn (China) Li Na	(Denmark) Caroline Wozniacki (Ukraine) Alona Bondarenko (Italy) Sara Errani (Bulgaria) Tsvetana Pironkova
14 June	Aegon International; Eastbourne, UK	(Russia) Ekaterina Makarova; 7–6^{(7–5)}, 6–4	(Belarus) Victoria Azarenka	(France) Marion Bartoli (Australia) Samantha Stosur	(Spain) María José Martínez Sánchez (Belgium) Kim Clijsters (United Kingdom) Elena Baltacha (Russia) Svetlana Kuznetsova
14 June	Aegon International; Eastbourne, UK	(United States) Lisa Raymond (Australia) Rennae Stubbs; 6–2, 2–6, [13–11]	(Czech Republic) Květa Peschke (Slovenia) Katarina Srebotnik	(France) Marion Bartoli (Australia) Samantha Stosur	(Spain) María José Martínez Sánchez (Belgium) Kim Clijsters (United Kingdom) Elena Baltacha (Russia) Svetlana Kuznetsova
26 July	Bank of the West Classic; Stanford, USA	(Belarus) Victoria Azarenka; 6–4, 6–1	(Russia) Maria Sharapova	(Australia) Samantha Stosur (Poland) Agnieszka Radwańska	(Belgium) Yanina Wickmayer (France) Marion Bartoli (Russia) Maria Kirilenko (Russia) Elena Dementieva
26 July	Bank of the West Classic; Stanford, USA	(United States) Lindsay Davenport (United States) Liezel Huber; 7–5, 6–7^{(8–10)}, [10–8]	(Chinese Taipei) Chan Yung-jan (China) Zheng Jie	(Australia) Samantha Stosur (Poland) Agnieszka Radwańska	(Belgium) Yanina Wickmayer (France) Marion Bartoli (Russia) Maria Kirilenko (Russia) Elena Dementieva
2 August	Southern California Open; San Diego, USA	(Russia) Svetlana Kuznetsova; 6–4, 6–7^{(7–9)}, 6–3	(Poland) Agnieszka Radwańska	(Slovakia) Daniela Hantuchová (Italy) Flavia Pennetta	(Russia) Alisa Kleybanova (Israel) Shahar Pe'er (United States) Coco Vandeweghe (Australia) Samantha Stosur
2 August	Southern California Open; San Diego, USA	(Russia) Maria Kirilenko (China) Zheng Jie; 6–4, 6–4	(United States) Lisa Raymond (Australia) Rennae Stubbs	(Slovakia) Daniela Hantuchová (Italy) Flavia Pennetta	(Russia) Alisa Kleybanova (Israel) Shahar Pe'er (United States) Coco Vandeweghe (Australia) Samantha Stosur
22 August	Pilot Pen Tennis at Yale; New Haven, USA	(Denmark) Caroline Wozniacki; 6–3, 3–6, 6–3	(Russia) Nadia Petrova	(Russia) Elena Dementieva (Russia) Maria Kirilenko	(Italy) Flavia Pennetta (France) Marion Bartoli (Russia) Dinara Safina (Australia) Samantha Stosur
22 August	Pilot Pen Tennis at Yale; New Haven, USA	(Czech Republic) Květa Peschke (Slovenia) Katarina Srebotnik; 7–5, 6–0	(United States) Bethanie Mattek-Sands (United States) Meghann Shaughnessy	(Russia) Elena Dementieva (Russia) Maria Kirilenko	(Italy) Flavia Pennetta (France) Marion Bartoli (Russia) Dinara Safina (Australia) Samantha Stosur
18 October	Kremlin Cup; Moscow, Russia	(Belarus) Victoria Azarenka; 6–3, 6–4	(Russia) Maria Kirilenko	(Russia) Vera Dushevina (Spain) María José Martínez Sánchez	(Kazakhstan) Zarina Diyas (Russia) Anna Chakvetadze (Slovakia) Dominika Cibulková (Russia) Alisa Kleybanova
18 October	Kremlin Cup; Moscow, Russia	(Argentina) Gisela Dulko (Italy) Flavia Pennetta; 6–3, 2–6, [10–6]	(Italy) Sara Errani (Spain) María José Martínez Sánchez	(Russia) Vera Dushevina (Spain) María José Martínez Sánchez	(Kazakhstan) Zarina Diyas (Russia) Anna Chakvetadze (Slovakia) Dominika Cibulková (Russia) Alisa Kleybanova
