= 2011 WTA Premier tournaments =

The 2011 WTA Premier tournaments are 20 of the tennis tournaments on the 2011 WTA Tour. The WTA Tour is the elite tour for women's professional tennis. The WTA Premier tournaments rank below the Grand Slam events and above the WTA International tournaments. They are divided into three levels: Premier Mandatory (Indian Wells, Miami, Madrid and Beijing), Premier 5 (Dubai, Rome, Canada, Cincinnati and Tokyo), and Premier (11 tournaments in Europe, United States and Australia).

== Schedule ==
=== Premier ===
| Week of | Tournament | Champions | Runners-up | Semifinalists | Quarterfinalists |
|---|---|---|---|---|---|
| 10 January | Medibank International Sydney; Sydney, Australia | (China) Li Na; 7–6^{(7–3)}, 6–3 | (Belgium) Kim Clijsters | (Russia) Alisa Kleybanova (Serbia) Bojana Jovanovski | (Slovakia) Dominika Cibulková (Belarus) Victoria Azarenka (Russia) Svetlana Kuznetsova (Italy) Flavia Pennetta |
| 10 January | Medibank International Sydney; Sydney, Australia | (Czech Republic) Iveta Benešová (Czech Republic) Barbora Záhlavová-Strýcová; 4–6, 6–4, [10–7] | (Czech Republic) Květa Peschke (Slovenia) Katarina Srebotnik | (Russia) Alisa Kleybanova (Serbia) Bojana Jovanovski | (Slovakia) Dominika Cibulková (Belarus) Victoria Azarenka (Russia) Svetlana Kuznetsova (Italy) Flavia Pennetta |
| 7 February | Open GDF Suez; Paris, France | (Czech Republic) Petra Kvitová; 6–4, 6–3 | (Belgium) Kim Clijsters | (Estonia) Kaia Kanepi (United States) Bethanie Mattek-Sands | (Australia) Jelena Dokić (Slovakia) Dominika Cibulková (Belgium) Yanina Wickmayer (Germany) Andrea Petkovic |
| 7 February | Open GDF Suez; Paris, France | (United States) Bethanie Mattek-Sands (United States) Meghann Shaughnessy; 6–4, 6–2 | (Russia) Vera Dushevina (Russia) Ekaterina Makarova | (Estonia) Kaia Kanepi (United States) Bethanie Mattek-Sands | (Australia) Jelena Dokić (Slovakia) Dominika Cibulková (Belgium) Yanina Wickmayer (Germany) Andrea Petkovic |
| 21 February | Qatar Ladies Open; Doha, Qatar | (Russia) Vera Zvonareva; 6–4, 6–4 | (Denmark) Caroline Wozniacki | (France) Marion Bartoli (Serbia) Jelena Janković | (Italy) Flavia Pennetta (China) Peng Shuai (Czech Republic) Klára Zakopalová (Slovakia) Daniela Hantuchová |
| 21 February | Qatar Ladies Open; Doha, Qatar | (Czech Republic) Květa Peschke (Slovenia) Katarina Srebotnik; 7–5, 6–7^{(2–7)}, [10–8] | (United States) Liezel Huber (Russia) Nadia Petrova | (France) Marion Bartoli (Serbia) Jelena Janković | (Italy) Flavia Pennetta (China) Peng Shuai (Czech Republic) Klára Zakopalová (Slovakia) Daniela Hantuchová |
| 4 April | Family Circle Cup; Charleston, USA | (Denmark) Caroline Wozniacki; 6–2, 6–3 | (Russia) Elena Vesnina | (Serbia) Jelena Janković (China) Peng Shuai | (Belgium) Yanina Wickmayer (United States) Christina McHale (India) Sania Mirza (Germany) Julia Görges |
| 4 April | Family Circle Cup; Charleston, USA | (India) Sania Mirza (Russia) Elena Vesnina; 6–4, 6–4, | (United States) Bethanie Mattek-Sands (United States) Meghann Shaughnessy | (Serbia) Jelena Janković (China) Peng Shuai | (Belgium) Yanina Wickmayer (United States) Christina McHale (India) Sania Mirza (Germany) Julia Görges |
| 18 April | Porsche Tennis Grand Prix; Stuttgart, Germany | (Germany) Julia Görges; 7–6^{(7–3)}, 6–3 | (Denmark) Caroline Wozniacki | (Poland) Agnieszka Radwańska (Australia) Samantha Stosur | (Germany) Andrea Petkovic (Germany) Kristina Barrois (Germany) Sabine Lisicki (Russia) Vera Zvonareva |
| 18 April | Porsche Tennis Grand Prix; Stuttgart, Germany | (Germany) Sabine Lisicki (Australia) Samantha Stosur; 6–1, 7–6^{(7–5)} | (Germany) Kristina Barrois (Germany) Jasmin Wöhr | (Poland) Agnieszka Radwańska (Australia) Samantha Stosur | (Germany) Andrea Petkovic (Germany) Kristina Barrois (Germany) Sabine Lisicki (Russia) Vera Zvonareva |
| 16 May | Brussels Ladies Open; Brussels, Belgium | (Denmark) Caroline Wozniacki; 2–6, 6–3, 6–3 | (China) Peng Shuai | (Italy) Francesca Schiavone (Russia) Vera Zvonareva | (Belgium) Yanina Wickmayer (Japan) Ayumi Morita (Sweden) Sofia Arvidsson (Romania) Alexandra Dulgheru |
| 16 May | Brussels Ladies Open; Brussels, Belgium | (Czech Republic) Andrea Hlaváčková (Kazakhstan) Galina Voskoboeva; 3–6, 6–0, [10–5] | (Poland) Klaudia Jans (Poland) Alicja Rosolska | (Italy) Francesca Schiavone (Russia) Vera Zvonareva | (Belgium) Yanina Wickmayer (Japan) Ayumi Morita (Sweden) Sofia Arvidsson (Romania) Alexandra Dulgheru |
| 13 June | Aegon International; Eastbourne, UK | (France) Marion Bartoli; 6–1, 4–6, 7–5 | (Czech Republic) Petra Kvitová | (Australia) Samantha Stosur (Slovakia) Daniela Hantuchová | (Russia) Vera Zvonareva (Belarus) Victoria Azarenka (Poland) Agnieszka Radwańska (United States) Venus Williams |
| 13 June | Aegon International; Eastbourne, UK | (Czech Republic) Květa Peschke (Slovenia) Katarina Srebotnik; 6–3, 6–0 | (United States) Liezel Huber (United States) Lisa Raymond | (Australia) Samantha Stosur (Slovakia) Daniela Hantuchová | (Russia) Vera Zvonareva (Belarus) Victoria Azarenka (Poland) Agnieszka Radwańska (United States) Venus Williams |
| 25 July | Bank of the West Classic; Stanford, USA | (United States) Serena Williams; 7–5, 6–1 | (France) Marion Bartoli | (Slovakia) Dominika Cibulková (Germany) Sabine Lisicki | (New Zealand) Marina Erakovic (Japan) Ayumi Morita (Poland) Agnieszka Radwańska (Russia) Maria Sharapova |
| 25 July | Bank of the West Classic; Stanford, USA | (Belarus) Victoria Azarenka (Russia) Maria Kirilenko; 6–1, 6–3 | (United States) Liezel Huber (United States) Lisa Raymond | (Slovakia) Dominika Cibulková (Germany) Sabine Lisicki | (New Zealand) Marina Erakovic (Japan) Ayumi Morita (Poland) Agnieszka Radwańska (Russia) Maria Sharapova |
| 1 August | Mercury Insurance Open; San Diego, USA | (Poland) Agnieszka Radwańska; 6–3, 6–4 | (Russia) Vera Zvonareva | (Serbia) Ana Ivanovic (Germany) Andrea Petkovic | (Germany) Sabine Lisicki (China) Peng Shuai (Slovakia) Daniela Hantuchová (United States) Sloane Stephens |
| 1 August | Mercury Insurance Open; San Diego, USA | (Czech Republic) Květa Peschke (Slovenia) Katarina Srebotnik; 6–0, 6–2 | (United States) Raquel Kops-Jones (United States) Abigail Spears | (Serbia) Ana Ivanovic (Germany) Andrea Petkovic | (Germany) Sabine Lisicki (China) Peng Shuai (Slovakia) Daniela Hantuchová (United States) Sloane Stephens |
| 22 August | Pilot Pen Tennis at Yale; New Haven, USA | (Denmark) Caroline Wozniacki; 6–4, 6–1 | (Czech Republic) Petra Cetkovská | (Italy) Francesca Schiavone (China) Li Na | (United States) Christina McHale (Spain) Anabel Medina Garrigues (France) Marion Bartoli (Russia) Anastasia Pavlyuchenkova |
| 22 August | Pilot Pen Tennis at Yale; New Haven, USA | (Chinese Taipei) Chuang Chia-jung (Belarus) Olga Govortsova; 7–5, 6–2 | (Italy) Sara Errani (Italy) Roberta Vinci | (Italy) Francesca Schiavone (China) Li Na | (United States) Christina McHale (Spain) Anabel Medina Garrigues (France) Marion Bartoli (Russia) Anastasia Pavlyuchenkova |
| 17 October | Kremlin Cup; Moscow, Russia | (Slovakia) Dominika Cibulková; 3–6, 7–6^{(7–1)}, 7–5 | (Estonia) Kaia Kanepi | (Russia) Elena Vesnina (Czech Republic) Lucie Šafářová | (Russia) Vera Zvonareva (France) Marion Bartoli (Russia) Svetlana Kuznetsova (Russia) Vera Dushevina |
| 17 October | Kremlin Cup; Moscow, Russia | (United States) Vania King (Kazakhstan) Yaroslava Shvedova; 7–6^{(7–3)}, 6–3 | (Australia) Anastasia Rodionova (Kazakhstan) Galina Voskoboeva | (Russia) Elena Vesnina (Czech Republic) Lucie Šafářová | (Russia) Vera Zvonareva (France) Marion Bartoli (Russia) Svetlana Kuznetsova (Russia) Vera Dushevina |
