= 2013 Porsche Tennis Grand Prix =

Women's tennis tournament

- Date: 22–28 April
- Edition: 36th
- Draw: 28S / 16D
- Prize money: $795,707
- Surface: Clay / indoor
- Location: Stuttgart, Germany

Champions

Singles
- (Russia) Maria Sharapova

Doubles
- (Germany) Mona Barthel / (Germany) Sabine Lisicki
| ← 2012 · | Porsche Tennis Grand Prix | · 2014 → |

The 2013 Porsche Tennis Grand Prix was a women's tennis tournament played on indoor clay courts. It was the 36th edition of the Porsche Tennis Grand Prix, and was part of the Premier tournaments of the 2013 WTA Tour. It took place at the Porsche Arena in Stuttgart, Germany, from April 22 until 28 April 2013. First-seeded Maria Sharapova won her second consecutive singles title at the event.

== Finals ==
=== Singles ===
(Russia) Maria Sharapova defeated (China) Li Na 6–4, 6–3

- It was Sharapova's 2nd title of the year and 29th of her career.

=== Doubles ===
(Germany) Mona Barthel / (Germany) Sabine Lisicki defeated (United States) Bethanie Mattek-Sands / (India) Sania Mirza, 6–4, 7–5

== Singles main draw entrants ==
=== Seeds ===
| Country | Player | Rank^{1} | Seed |
|---|---|---|---|
| RUS | Maria Sharapova | 2 | 1 |
| CHN | Li Na | 5 | 2 |
| GER | Angelique Kerber | 6 | 3 |
| ITA | Sara Errani | 7 | 4 |
| CZE | Petra Kvitová | 8 | 5 |
| AUS | Samantha Stosur | 9 | 6 |
| DEN | Caroline Wozniacki | 10 | 7 |
| RUS | Nadia Petrova | 11 | 8 |

- ^{1} Rankings are as of April 15, 2013.

=== Other entrants ===
The following players received wildcards into the singles main draw:

- (Germany) Annika Beck
- (Germany) Andrea Petkovic

The following players received entry from the qualifying draw:

- (Italy) Nastassja Burnett
- (Croatia) Mirjana Lučić-Baroni
- (United States) Bethanie Mattek-Sands
- (Germany) Dinah Pfizenmaier

=== Withdrawals ===
- (Austria) Tamira Paszek
- (Czech Republic) Klára Zakopalová

=== Retirements ===
- (Belgium) Kirsten Flipkens (gastrointestinal illness)

== Doubles main draw entrants ==
=== Seeds ===
| Country | Player | Country | Player | Rank^{1} | Seed |
|---|---|---|---|---|---|
| ITA | Sara Errani | ITA | Roberta Vinci | 3 | 1 |
| RUS | Nadia Petrova | SLO | Katarina Srebotnik | 11 | 2 |
| RUS | Ekaterina Makarova | RUS | Elena Vesnina | 13 | 3 |
| USA | Raquel Kops-Jones | USA | Abigail Spears | 29 | 4 |

- Rankings are as of April 15, 2013.

=== Other entrants ===
The following pairs received wildcards into the doubles main draw:

- (Germany) Mona Barthel / (Germany) Sabine Lisicki
- (Serbia) Jelena Janković / (Croatia) Mirjana Lučić-Baroni
- (Germany) Angelique Kerber / (Germany) Andrea Petkovic

The following pair received entry as alternates:

- (United States) Jill Craybas / (United States) Megan Moulton-Levy

=== Withdrawals ===
Before the tournament

- (Italy) Roberta Vinci (shoulder injury)
