= 2020 WTA Premier tournaments =

The 2020 WTA Premier tournaments are 21 of the tennis tournaments on the 2020 WTA Tour. The WTA Tour is the elite tour for women's professional tennis. The WTA Premier tournaments rank below the Grand Slam events and above the WTA International tournaments. They are divided into three levels: Premier Mandatory (Indian Wells, Miami, Madrid and Beijing), Premier 5 (Doha, Rome, Canada, Cincinnati and Wuhan), and Premier (12 tournaments in Europe, United States and Australia).

== Schedule ==
=== Premier ===
Week of	Tournament	Champions	Runners-up	Semifinalists	Quarterfinalists
6 January	Brisbane International; Brisbane, Australia	(Czech Republic) Karolína Plíšková; 6–4, 4–6, 7–5	(United States) Madison Keys	(Czech Republic) Petra Kvitová (Japan) Naomi Osaka	(United States) Jennifer Brady (United States) Danielle Collins (Netherlands) Kiki Bertens (United States) Alison Riske
6 January	Brisbane International; Brisbane, Australia	(Chinese Taipei) Hsieh Su-wei (Czech Republic) Barbora Strýcová; 3–6, 7–6^{(9–7)}, [10–8]	(Australia) Ashleigh Barty (Netherlands) Kiki Bertens	(Czech Republic) Petra Kvitová (Japan) Naomi Osaka	(United States) Jennifer Brady (United States) Danielle Collins (Netherlands) Kiki Bertens (United States) Alison Riske
13 January	Adelaide International; Adelaide, Australia	(Australia) Ashleigh Barty; 6–2, 7–5	(Ukraine) Dayana Yastremska	(United States) Danielle Collins (Belarus) Aryna Sabalenka	(Czech Republic) Markéta Vondroušová (Switzerland) Belinda Bencic (Croatia) Donna Vekić (Romania) Simona Halep
13 January	Adelaide International; Adelaide, Australia	(United States) Nicole Melichar (China) Xu Yifan; 2–6, 7–5, [10–5]	(Canada) Gabriela Dabrowski (Croatia) Darija Jurak	(United States) Danielle Collins (Belarus) Aryna Sabalenka	(Czech Republic) Markéta Vondroušová (Switzerland) Belinda Bencic (Croatia) Donna Vekić (Romania) Simona Halep
10 February	St. Petersburg Ladies' Trophy; St. Petersburg, Russia	(Netherlands) Kiki Bertens; 6–1, 6–3	(Kazakhstan) Elena Rybakina	(Greece) Maria Sakkari (Russia) Ekaterina Alexandrova	(Switzerland) Belinda Bencic (France) Océane Dodin (Czech Republic) Petra Kvitová (Russia) Anastasia Potapova
10 February	St. Petersburg Ladies' Trophy; St. Petersburg, Russia	(Japan) Shuko Aoyama (Japan) Ena Shibahara; 4–6, 6–0, [10–3]	(United States) Kaitlyn Christian (Chile) Alexa Guarachi	(Greece) Maria Sakkari (Russia) Ekaterina Alexandrova	(Switzerland) Belinda Bencic (France) Océane Dodin (Czech Republic) Petra Kvitová (Russia) Anastasia Potapova
17 February	Dubai Tennis Championships; Dubai, UAE	(Romania) Simona Halep; 3–6, 6–3, 7–6^{(7–5)}	(Kazakhstan) Elena Rybakina	(United States) Jennifer Brady (Croatia) Petra Martić	(Belarus) Aryna Sabalenka (Spain) Garbiñe Muguruza (Estonia) Anett Kontaveit (Czech Republic) Karolína Plíšková
17 February	Dubai Tennis Championships; Dubai, UAE	(Chinese Taipei) Hsieh Su-wei (Czech Republic) Barbora Strýcová; 7–5, 3–6, [10–5]	(Czech Republic) Barbora Krejčíková (China) Zheng Saisai	(United States) Jennifer Brady (Croatia) Petra Martić	(Belarus) Aryna Sabalenka (Spain) Garbiñe Muguruza (Estonia) Anett Kontaveit (Czech Republic) Karolína Plíšková
6 April	Volvo Car Open; Charleston, USA	Cancelled due to coronavirus outbreak.			
20 April	Porsche Tennis Grand Prix; Stuttgart, Germany	Cancelled due to coronavirus outbreak.			
15 June	German Open; Berlin, Germany	Cancelled due to coronavirus outbreak.			
22 June	Eastbourne International; Eastbourne, UK	Cancelled due to coronavirus outbreak.			
3 August	Silicon Valley Classic; San Jose, USA	Cancelled due to coronavirus outbreak.			
14 September	Zhengzhou Open; Zhengzhou, China	Cancelled due to coronavirus outbreak.			
21 September	Toray Pan Pacific Open; Tokyo, Japan	Cancelled due to coronavirus outbreak.			
19 October	Ostrava Open; Ostrava, Czech Republic	(Belarus) Aryna Sabalenka; 6–2, 6–2	(Belarus) Victoria Azarenka	(Greece) Maria Sakkari (United States) Jennifer Brady	(Tunisia) Ons Jabeur (Belgium) Elise Mertens (Spain) Sara Sorribes Tormo (Russia) Veronika Kudermetova
19 October	Ostrava Open; Ostrava, Czech Republic	(Belgium) Elise Mertens (Belarus) Aryna Sabalenka; 6–1, 6–3	(Canada) Gabriela Dabrowski (Brazil) Luisa Stefani	(Greece) Maria Sakkari (United States) Jennifer Brady	(Tunisia) Ons Jabeur (Belgium) Elise Mertens (Spain) Sara Sorribes Tormo (Russia) Veronika Kudermetova
26 October	Kremlin Cup; Moscow, Russia	Cancelled due to coronavirus outbreak.			
