= 2013 Porsche Tennis Grand Prix – Doubles =

Doubles
- 2013 Porsche Tennis Grand Prix

Final
- Champions: (Germany) Mona Barthel (Germany) Sabine Lisicki
- Runners-up: (United States) Bethanie Mattek-Sands (India) Sania Mirza
- Score: 6–4, 7–5

Details
- Draw: 16
- Seeds: 4

Events
Singles	Doubles
- Porsche Tennis Grand Prix

Iveta Benešová and Barbora Záhlavová-Strýcová were the defending champions, but Benešová decided not to participate.
Záhlavová-Strýcová played alongside Julia Görges, but they lost in the first round to Liezel Huber and Janette Husárová.
Mona Barthel and Sabine Lisicki won the title, defeating Bethanie Mattek-Sands and Sania Mirza in the final, 6–4, 7–5.

== Seeds ==
1. (Italy) Sara Errani / (Italy) Roberta Vinci (withdrew)
2. (Russia) Nadia Petrova / (Slovenia) Katarina Srebotnik (first round)
3. (Russia) Ekaterina Makarova / (Russia) Elena Vesnina (first round)
4. (United States) Raquel Kops-Jones / (United States) Abigail Spears (quarterfinals)

== Draw ==
Key

- Q = Qualifier
- WC = Wild card
- LL = Lucky loser
- Alt = Alternate
- ITF = ITF entry
- PR = Protected ranking
- SR = Special ranking
- SE = Special exempt
- JE = Junior exempt
- JR = Junior Accelerator Programme entrant
- CO = College Accelerator Programme entrant
- NG = Next Gen Accelerator Program entrant
- w/o = Walkover
- r = Retired
- d = Defaulted

=== Draw ===
First round
Alt	(United States) J Craybas (United States) M Moulton-Levy	1	1
WC	(Germany) M Barthel (Germany) S Lisicki	6	6
(Germany) K Barrois (Kazakhstan) Y Shvedova	3	6^{5}
WC	(Serbia) J Janković (Croatia) M Lučić-Baroni	6	7^{7}
4	(United States) R Kops-Jones (United States) A Spears	6	6
(Zimbabwe) C Black (Australia) A Rodionova	1	0
(Croatia) D Jurak (Hungary) K Marosi	6	7^{7}
(Russia) A Pavlyuchenkova (Czech Republic) L Šafářová	4	6^{4}
(Germany) A-L Grönefeld (Czech Republic) K Peschke	6	6
(New Zealand) M Erakovic (China) S Peng	2	3
WC	(Germany) A Kerber (Germany) A Petkovic	6	7^{7}
3	(Russia) E Makarova (Russia) E Vesnina	1	6^{2}
(Germany) J Görges (Czech Republic) B Záhlavová-Strýcová	4	6	[6]
(United States) L Huber (Slovakia) J Husárová	6	4	[10]
(United States) B Mattek-Sands (India) S Mirza	7^{7}	7
2	(Russia) N Petrova (Slovenia) K Srebotnik	6^{3}	5

Quarterfinals
WC	(Germany) M Barthel (Germany) S Lisicki	6	2	[10]
WC	(Serbia) J Janković (Croatia) M Lučić-Baroni	1	6	[4]
4	(United States) R Kops-Jones (United States) A Spears	6	4	[9]
(Croatia) D Jurak (Hungary) K Marosi	3	6	[11]
(Germany) A-L Grönefeld (Czech Republic) K Peschke	6^{8}	2
WC	(Germany) A Kerber (Germany) A Petkovic	7^{10}	6
(United States) L Huber (Slovakia) J Husárová	5	4
(United States) B Mattek-Sands (India) S Mirza	7	6

Semifinals
WC	(Germany) M Barthel (Germany) S Lisicki	6	6
(Croatia) D Jurak (Hungary) K Marosi	3	4
WC	(Germany) A Kerber (Germany) A Petkovic	4	5
(United States) B Mattek-Sands (India) S Mirza	6	7

Final
WC	(Germany) M Barthel (Germany) S Lisicki	6	7
(United States) B Mattek-Sands (India) S Mirza	4	5
