= 2017 WTA Premier tournaments =

The 2017 WTA Premier tournaments are 21 of the tennis tournaments on the 2017 WTA Tour. The WTA Tour is the elite tour for women's professional tennis. The WTA Premier tournaments rank below the Grand Slam events and above the WTA International tournaments. They are divided into three levels: Premier Mandatory (Indian Wells, Miami, Madrid and Beijing), Premier 5 (Doha, Rome, Canada, Cincinnati and Wuhan), and Premier (12 tournaments in Europe, United States and Australia).

== Schedule ==
=== Premier ===
Week of	Tournament	Champions	Runners-up	Semifinalists	Quarterfinalists
2 January	Brisbane International; Brisbane, Australia	(Czech Republic) Karolína Plíšková; 6–0, 6–3	(France) Alizé Cornet	(Ukraine) Elina Svitolina (Spain) Garbiñe Muguruza	(Germany) Angelique Kerber (Italy) Roberta Vinci (Russia) Svetlana Kuznetsova (Slovakia) Dominika Cibulková
2 January	Brisbane International; Brisbane, Australia	(United States) Bethanie Mattek-Sands (India) Sania Mirza; 6–2, 6–3	(Russia) Ekaterina Makarova (Russia) Elena Vesnina	(Ukraine) Elina Svitolina (Spain) Garbiñe Muguruza	(Germany) Angelique Kerber (Italy) Roberta Vinci (Russia) Svetlana Kuznetsova (Slovakia) Dominika Cibulková
9 January	Apia International Sydney; Sydney, Australia	(United Kingdom) Johanna Konta; 6–4, 6–2	(Poland) Agnieszka Radwańska	(Canada) Eugenie Bouchard (Czech Republic) Barbora Strýcová	(Russia) Daria Kasatkina (Russia) Anastasia Pavlyuchenkova (Denmark) Caroline Wozniacki (China) Duan Yingying
9 January	Apia International Sydney; Sydney, Australia	(Hungary) Tímea Babos (Russia) Anastasia Pavlyuchenkova; 6–4, 6–4	(India) Sania Mirza (Czech Republic) Barbora Strýcová	(Canada) Eugenie Bouchard (Czech Republic) Barbora Strýcová	(Russia) Daria Kasatkina (Russia) Anastasia Pavlyuchenkova (Denmark) Caroline Wozniacki (China) Duan Yingying
30 January	St. Petersburg Ladies' Trophy; St. Petersburg, Russia	(France) Kristina Mladenovic; 6–2, 6–7^{(3–7)}, 6–4	(Kazakhstan) Yulia Putintseva	(Russia) Natalia Vikhlyantseva (Slovakia) Dominika Cibulková	(Romania) Simona Halep (Italy) Roberta Vinci (Russia) Svetlana Kuznetsova (Russia) Elena Vesnina
30 January	St. Petersburg Ladies' Trophy; St. Petersburg, Russia	(Latvia) Jeļena Ostapenko (Poland) Alicja Rosolska; 3–6, 6–2, [10–5]	(Croatia) Darija Jurak (Switzerland) Xenia Knoll	(Russia) Natalia Vikhlyantseva (Slovakia) Dominika Cibulková	(Romania) Simona Halep (Italy) Roberta Vinci (Russia) Svetlana Kuznetsova (Russia) Elena Vesnina
13 February	Qatar Total Open; Doha, Qatar	(Czech Republic) Karolína Plíšková; 6–3, 6–4	(Denmark) Caroline Wozniacki	(Puerto Rico) Monica Puig (Slovakia) Dominika Cibulková	(Russia) Daria Kasatkina (United States) Lauren Davis (Australia) Samantha Stosur (China) Zhang Shuai
13 February	Qatar Total Open; Doha, Qatar	(United States) Abigail Spears (Slovenia) Katarina Srebotnik; 6–3, 7–6^{(9–7)}	(Ukraine) Olga Savchuk (Kazakhstan) Yaroslava Shvedova	(Puerto Rico) Monica Puig (Slovakia) Dominika Cibulková	(Russia) Daria Kasatkina (United States) Lauren Davis (Australia) Samantha Stosur (China) Zhang Shuai
3 April	Volvo Car Open; Charleston, USA	(Russia) Daria Kasatkina; 6–3, 6–1	(Latvia) Jeļena Ostapenko	(Croatia) Mirjana Lučić-Baroni (Germany) Laura Siegemund	(United States) Shelby Rogers (Denmark) Caroline Wozniacki (Latvia) Anastasija Sevastova (Romania) Irina-Camelia Begu
3 April	Volvo Car Open; Charleston, USA	(United States) Bethanie Mattek-Sands (Czech Republic) Lucie Šafářová; 6–1, 4–6, [10–7]	(Czech Republic) Lucie Hradecká (Czech Republic) Kateřina Siniaková	(Croatia) Mirjana Lučić-Baroni (Germany) Laura Siegemund	(United States) Shelby Rogers (Denmark) Caroline Wozniacki (Latvia) Anastasija Sevastova (Romania) Irina-Camelia Begu
24 April	Porsche Tennis Grand Prix; Stuttgart, Germany	(Germany) Laura Siegemund; 6–1, 2–6, 7–6^{(7–5)}	(France) Kristina Mladenovic	(Russia) Maria Sharapova (Romania) Simona Halep	(Spain) Carla Suárez Navarro (Estonia) Anett Kontaveit (Latvia) Anastasija Sevastova (Czech Republic) Karolína Plíšková
24 April	Porsche Tennis Grand Prix; Stuttgart, Germany	(United States) Raquel Atawo (Latvia) Jeļena Ostapenko; 6–4, 6–4	(United States) Abigail Spears (Slovenia) Katarina Srebotnik	(Russia) Maria Sharapova (Romania) Simona Halep	(Spain) Carla Suárez Navarro (Estonia) Anett Kontaveit (Latvia) Anastasija Sevastova (Czech Republic) Karolína Plíšková
19 June	Aegon Classic; Birmingham, UK	(Czech Republic) Petra Kvitová; 4–6, 6–3, 6–2	(Australia) Ashleigh Barty	(Czech Republic) Lucie Šafářová (Spain) Garbiñe Muguruza	(Australia) Daria Gavrilova (France) Kristina Mladenovic (United States) Coco Vandeweghe (Italy) Camila Giorgi
19 June	Aegon Classic; Birmingham, UK	(Australia) Ashleigh Barty (Australia) Casey Dellacqua; 6–1, 2–6, [10–8]	(Chinese Taipei) Chan Hao-ching (China) Zhang Shuai	(Czech Republic) Lucie Šafářová (Spain) Garbiñe Muguruza	(Australia) Daria Gavrilova (France) Kristina Mladenovic (United States) Coco Vandeweghe (Italy) Camila Giorgi
26 June	Aegon International; Eastbourne, UK	(Czech Republic) Karolína Plíšková; 6–4, 6–4	(Denmark) Caroline Wozniacki	(United Kingdom) Johanna Konta (United Kingdom) Heather Watson	(Germany) Angelique Kerber (Russia) Svetlana Kuznetsova (Czech Republic) Barbora Strýcová (Romania) Simona Halep
26 June	Aegon International; Eastbourne, UK	(Chinese Taipei) Chan Yung-jan (Switzerland) Martina Hingis; 6–3, 7–5	(Australia) Ashleigh Barty (Australia) Casey Dellacqua	(United Kingdom) Johanna Konta (United Kingdom) Heather Watson	(Germany) Angelique Kerber (Russia) Svetlana Kuznetsova (Czech Republic) Barbora Strýcová (Romania) Simona Halep
31 July	Bank of the West Classic; Stanford, USA	(United States) Madison Keys; 7–6^{(7–4)}, 6–4	(United States) Coco Vandeweghe	(Spain) Garbiñe Muguruza (United States) Catherine Bellis	(Croatia) Ana Konjuh (Ukraine) Lesia Tsurenko (Russia) Anastasia Pavlyuchenkova (Czech Republic) Petra Kvitová
31 July	Bank of the West Classic; Stanford, USA	(United States) Abigail Spears (United States) Coco Vandeweghe; 6–2, 6–3	(France) Alizé Cornet (Poland) Alicja Rosolska	(Spain) Garbiñe Muguruza (United States) Catherine Bellis	(Croatia) Ana Konjuh (Ukraine) Lesia Tsurenko (Russia) Anastasia Pavlyuchenkova (Czech Republic) Petra Kvitová
21 August	Connecticut Open; New Haven, USA	(Australia) Daria Gavrilova; 4–6, 6–3, 6–4	(Slovakia) Dominika Cibulková	(Poland) Agnieszka Radwańska (Belgium) Elise Mertens	(China) Peng Shuai (Belgium) Kirsten Flipkens (China) Zhang Shuai (Russia) Anastasia Pavlyuchenkova
21 August	Connecticut Open; New Haven, USA	(Canada) Gabriela Dabrowski (China) Xu Yifan; 3–6, 6–3, [10–8]	(Australia) Ashleigh Barty (Australia) Casey Dellacqua	(Poland) Agnieszka Radwańska (Belgium) Elise Mertens	(China) Peng Shuai (Belgium) Kirsten Flipkens (China) Zhang Shuai (Russia) Anastasia Pavlyuchenkova
18 September	Toray Pan Pacific Open; Tokyo, Japan	(Denmark) Caroline Wozniacki; 6–0, 7–5	(Russia) Anastasia Pavlyuchenkova	(Spain) Garbiñe Muguruza (Germany) Angelique Kerber	(France) Caroline Garcia (Slovakia) Dominika Cibulková (Czech Republic) Barbora Strýcová (Czech Republic) Karolína Plíšková
18 September	Toray Pan Pacific Open; Tokyo, Japan	(Slovenia) Andreja Klepač (Spain) María José Martínez Sánchez; 6–3, 6–2	(Australia) Daria Gavrilova (Russia) Daria Kasatkina	(Spain) Garbiñe Muguruza (Germany) Angelique Kerber	(France) Caroline Garcia (Slovakia) Dominika Cibulková (Czech Republic) Barbora Strýcová (Czech Republic) Karolína Plíšková
16 October	Kremlin Cup; Moscow, Russia	(Germany) Julia Görges; 6–1, 6–2	(Russia) Daria Kasatkina	(Romania) Irina-Camelia Begu (Russia) Natalia Vikhlyantseva	(Belarus) Aliaksandra Sasnovich (Belarus) Vera Lapko (France) Alizé Cornet (Ukraine) Lesia Tsurenko
16 October	Kremlin Cup; Moscow, Russia	(Hungary) Tímea Babos (Czech Republic) Andrea Hlaváčková; 6–2, 3–6, [10–3]	(United States) Nicole Melichar (United Kingdom) Anna Smith	(Romania) Irina-Camelia Begu (Russia) Natalia Vikhlyantseva	(Belarus) Aliaksandra Sasnovich (Belarus) Vera Lapko (France) Alizé Cornet (Ukraine) Lesia Tsurenko
