= 2014 Porsche Tennis Grand Prix – Singles =

Singles
- 2014 Porsche Tennis Grand Prix

Final
- Champion: (Russia) Maria Sharapova
- Runner-up: (Serbia) Ana Ivanovic
- Score: 3–6, 6–4, 6–1

Details
- Draw: 28
- Seeds: 8

Events
Singles	Doubles
- Porsche Tennis Grand Prix

Two-time defending champion Maria Sharapova defeated Ana Ivanovic in the final, 3–6, 6–4, 6–1 to win the singles tennis title at the 2014 Stuttgart Open.

== Seeds ==
The top four seeds receive a bye into the second round.

1. (Poland) Agnieszka Radwańska (quarterfinals)
2. (Romania) Simona Halep (second round)
3. (Czech Republic) Petra Kvitová (second round)
4. (Germany) Angelique Kerber (second round)
5. (Serbia) Jelena Janković (semifinals)
6. (Russia) Maria Sharapova (champion)
7. (Slovakia) Dominika Cibulková (withdrew because of an Achilles injury)
8. (Italy) Sara Errani (semifinals)
9. (Serbia) Ana Ivanovic (final) (Note: Ana Ivanovic was originally unseeded, and was initially drawn to face fifth seed Jelena Janković in the first round, however after Dominika Cibulková withdrew Ivanovic became the ninth seed, resulting in a draw reshuffle. Ivanovic took Cibulková's original slot in the draw; leaving Janković to face lucky loser Mona Barthel in the first round.)

== Draw ==
Key

- Q = Qualifier
- WC = Wild card
- LL = Lucky loser
- Alt = Alternate
- ITF = ITF entry
- PR = Protected ranking
- SR = Special ranking
- SE = Special exempt
- JE = Junior exempt
- JR = Junior Accelerator Programme entrant
- CO = College Accelerator Programme entrant
- NG = Next Gen Accelerator Program entrant
- w/o = Walkover
- r = Retired
- d = Defaulted

=== Finals ===
Semifinals
6	(Russia) Maria Sharapova	6	6
8	(Italy) Sara Errani	1	2
5	(Serbia) Jelena Janković	3	5
9	(Serbia) Ana Ivanovic	6	7

Final
6	(Russia) Maria Sharapova	3	6	6
9	(Serbia) Ana Ivanovic	6	4	1

=== Top half ===
First round
(Italy) R Vinci	6	6
Q	(Germany) A Beck	3	2
(Russia) A Pavlyuchenkova	6	6
Q	(Latvia) D Marcinkēviča	3	2
(Czech Republic) L Šafářová	6^{5}	7^{7}	6^{2}
6	(Russia) M Sharapova	7^{7}	6^{5}	7^{7}
(Spain) C Suárez Navarro	6	6
(Russia) E Makarova	0	4
LL	(United Kingdom) J Konta	6^{4}	4
(Estonia) K Kanepi	7^{7}	6
(Czech Republic) K Koukalová	3	4
8	(Italy) S Errani	6	6

Second round
1	(Poland) A Radwańska	6	6
(Italy) R Vinci	3	2
(Russia) A Pavlyuchenkova	4	3
6	(Russia) M Sharapova	6	6
4	(Germany) A Kerber	5	4
(Spain) C Suárez Navarro	7	6
(Estonia) K Kanepi	3	3
8	(Italy) S Errani	6	6

Quarterfinals
1	(Poland) A Radwańska	4	3
6	(Russia) M Sharapova	6	6
(Spain) C Suárez Navarro	3	7^{8}	0^{r}
8	(Italy) S Errani	6	6^{6}	3

Semifinals
6	(Russia) M Sharapova	6	6
8	(Italy) S Errani	1	2

=== Bottom half ===
First round
5	(Serbia) J Janković	2	7^{10}	6
LL	(Germany) M Barthel	6	6^{8}	3
WC	(Germany) A Petkovic	5	6	1
(Italy) F Pennetta	7	3	6
Q	(Croatia) A Tomljanović	2	4
PR	(Russia) A Kleybanova	6	6
9	(Serbia) A Ivanovic	6	6
(Germany) S Lisicki	1	3
WC	(Germany) J Görges	6	7
(Romania) S Cîrstea	1	5
Q	(Italy) G Barbieri	2	3
(Russia) S Kuznetsova	6	6

Second round
5	(Serbia) J Janković	3	6	6
(Italy) F Pennetta	6	2	3
PR	(Russia) A Kleybanova	6	7^{7}
3	(Czech Republic) P Kvitová	2	6^{3}
9	(Serbia) A Ivanovic	1	6	6
WC	(Germany) J Görges	6	2	3
(Russia) S Kuznetsova	7	7^{7}
2	(Romania) S Halep	5	6^{4}

Quarterfinals
5	(Serbia) J Janković	6	6
PR	(Russia) A Kleybanova	4	3
9	(Serbia) A Ivanovic	6	2	6
(Russia) S Kuznetsova	3	6	4

Semifinals
5	(Serbia) J Janković	3	5
9	(Serbia) A Ivanovic	6	7

== Qualifying ==
=== Seeds ===
1. (Bulgaria) Tsvetana Pironkova (second round)
2. (Germany) Annika Beck (qualified)
3. (Croatia) Ajla Tomljanović (qualified)
4. (Germany) Dinah Pfizenmaier (first round)
5. (Germany) Mona Barthel (qualifying competition, lucky loser)
6. (Croatia) Mirjana Lučić-Baroni (second round)
7. (Germany) Anna-Lena Friedsam (second round)
8. (United Kingdom) Johanna Konta (qualifying competition, lucky loser)

=== Qualifiers ===
1. (Italy) Gioia Barbieri
2. (Germany) Annika Beck
3. (Croatia) Ajla Tomljanović
4. (Latvia) Diāna Marcinkēviča

=== Lucky losers ===
1. (Germany) Mona Barthel
2. (United Kingdom) Johanna Konta

=== Draw ===
==== First qualifier ====
First round
1	(Bulgaria) Tsvetana Pironkova	7^{7}	6
WC	(Germany) Tayisiya Morderger	6^{1}	1
(Italy) Gioia Barbieri	6	6
(Germany) Laura Siegemund	0	1
WC	(Germany) Anna Zaja	4	6	6
(France) Amandine Hesse	6	4	0
(Greece) Eleni Daniilidou	1	2
8	(United Kingdom) Johanna Konta	6	6

Second round
1	(Bulgaria) Tsvetana Pironkova	1	3
(Italy) Gioia Barbieri	6	6
WC	(Germany) Anna Zaja	7^{7}	2	4
8	(United Kingdom) Johanna Konta	6^{4}	6	6

Qualifying competition
(Italy) Gioia Barbieri	6	6
8	(United Kingdom) Johanna Konta	4	2

==== Second qualifier ====
First round
2	(Germany) Annika Beck	6^{4}	6	6
(Germany) Kristina Barrois	7^{7}	1	4
(France) Laura Thorpe	6^{6}	7	2
(Czech Republic) Eva Birnerová	7^{8}	5	6
(Czech Republic) Kateřina Vaňková	2	7^{8}	6
(United States) Madison Brengle	6	6^{6}	3
(Peru) Bianca Botto	3	2
7	(Germany) Anna-Lena Friedsam	6	6

Second round
2	(Germany) Annika Beck	6	1	6
(Czech Republic) Eva Birnerová	0	6	3
(Czech Republic) Kateřina Vaňková	1	6	7^{7}
7	(Germany) Anna-Lena Friedsam	6	4	6^{4}

Qualifying competition
2	(Germany) Annika Beck	6	6
(Czech Republic) Kateřina Vaňková	0	1

==== Third qualifier ====
First round
3	(Croatia) Ajla Tomljanović	6	6
(Germany) Carina Witthöft	3	4
WC	(Germany) Yana Morderger	3	2
(United States) Sachia Vickery	6	6
WC	(Germany) Antonia Lottner	6	6
(Belarus) Aliaksandra Sasnovich	4	4
(Hungary) Ágnes Bukta	6^{2}	3
5	(Germany) Mona Barthel	7^{7}	6

Second round
3	(Croatia) Ajla Tomljanović	7	5	6
(United States) Sachia Vickery	5	7	3
WC	(Germany) Antonia Lottner	1	2
5	(Germany) Mona Barthel	6	6

Qualifying competition
3	(Croatia) Ajla Tomljanović	6	5	7^{7}
5	(Germany) Mona Barthel	4	7	6^{1}

==== Fourth qualifier ====
First round
4	(Germany) Dinah Pfizenmaier	4	6	4
(Latvia) Diāna Marcinkēviča	6	3	6
(Serbia) Teodora Mirčić	6	6^{3}	5
(France) Alizé Lim	1	7^{7}	7
(Slovenia) Dalila Jakupovič	3	0
(Czech Republic) Kateřina Siniaková	6	6
(Italy) Nastassja Burnett	6	3	5
6	(Croatia) Mirjana Lučić-Baroni	4	6	7

Second round
(Latvia) Diāna Marcinkēviča	6	4	6
(France) Alizé Lim	4	6	1
(Czech Republic) Kateřina Siniaková	6	2	6
6	(Croatia) Mirjana Lučić-Baroni	0	6	0

Qualifying competition
(Latvia) Diāna Marcinkēviča	7	2	7
(Czech Republic) Kateřina Siniaková	5	6	5
