= 2018 Sydney International – Women's singles =

Women's singles
- 2018 Sydney International

Final
- Champion: (Germany) Angelique Kerber
- Runner-up: (Australia) Ashleigh Barty
- Score: 6–4, 6–4

Details
- Draw: 30 (4 Q / 2 WC )
- Seeds: 8

Events
Singles	men	women
Doubles	men	women
- Sydney International

Johanna Konta was the defending champion, but lost in the first round to Agnieszka Radwańska in a rematch of the previous year's final.

Angelique Kerber won the title, defeating Ashleigh Barty in the final, 6–4, 6–4. Kerber won the title despite being two match points down in the second set in her first-round match against Lucie Šafářová.

== Seeds ==
The top two seeds received a bye into the second round.

1. (Spain) Garbiñe Muguruza (quarterfinals, withdrew due to right leg injury)
2. (United States) Venus Williams (second round)
3. (Latvia) Jeļena Ostapenko (first round)
4. (United Kingdom) Johanna Konta (first round)
5. (France) Kristina Mladenovic (first round, retired)
6. (United States) Sloane Stephens (first round)
7. (Germany) Julia Görges (withdrew)
8. (Latvia) Anastasija Sevastova (first round)

== Draw ==
=== Finals ===
Semifinals
(Australia) Daria Gavrilova	6	4	2
(Australia) Ashleigh Barty	3	6	6
Q	(Italy) Camila Giorgi	2	3
(Germany) Angelique Kerber	6	6

Final
(Australia) Ashleigh Barty	4	4
(Germany) Angelique Kerber	6	6

=== Top half ===
First round
Q	(United States) K Ahn	2	4
(Netherlands) K Bertens	6	6
(Australia) D Gavrilova	6	1	7
WC	(Australia) O Rogowska	4	6	5
WC	(Australia) S Stosur	4	7	6
LL	(Germany) C Witthöft	6	5	3
3	(Latvia) J Ostapenko	6^{3}	1
(Russia) E Makarova	7^{7}	6
(Russia) D Kasatkina	5	6	4
(Czech Republic) B Strýcová	7	1	6
(Australia) A Barty	6	6
Q	(Paraguay) V Cepede Royg	3	4
WC	(Australia) E Perez	6	4
5	(France) K Mladenovic	4	2^{r}

Second round
1/WC	(Spain) G Muguruza	6	7^{8}
(Netherlands) K Bertens	3	6^{6}
(Australia) D Gavrilova	6	6
WC	(Australia) S Stosur	4	2
(Russia) E Makarova	4	1
(Czech Republic) B Strýcová	6	6
(Australia) A Barty	7^{7}	6
WC	(Australia) E Perez	6^{4}	1

Quarterfinals
1/WC	(Spain) G Muguruza
(Australia) D Gavrilova	w/o
(Czech Republic) B Strýcová	3	2
(Australia) A Barty	6	6

Semifinals
(Australia) D Gavrilova	6	4	2
(Australia) A Barty	3	6	6

=== Bottom half ===
First round
6	(United States) S Stephens	3	0
Q	(Italy) C Giorgi	6	6
(Croatia) M Lučić-Baroni	1	0^{r}
(Czech Republic) P Kvitová	6	0
Q	(United States) C Bellis	7^{7}	6
(Slovakia) M Rybáriková	6^{2}	0
(Poland) A Radwańska	6	7
4	(United Kingdom) J Konta	3	5
8	(Latvia) A Sevastova	3	1
(Slovakia) D Cibulková	6	6
(Russia) E Vesnina	6	6
LL	(Spain) L Arruabarrena	2	2
(Czech Republic) L Šafářová	7^{7}	6^{8}	2
(Germany) A Kerber	6^{3}	7^{10}	6

Second round
Q	(Italy) C Giorgi	7^{9}	6
(Czech Republic) P Kvitová	6^{7}	2
Q	(United States) C Bellis	6^{4}	0
(Poland) A Radwańska	7^{7}	6
(Slovakia) D Cibulková	6	6
(Russia) E Vesnina	4	4
(Germany) A Kerber	5	6	6
2	(United States) V Williams	7	3	1

Quarterfinals
Q	(Italy) C Giorgi	6	6
(Poland) A Radwańska	1	2
(Slovakia) D Cibulková	3	1
(Germany) A Kerber	6	6

Semifinals
Q	(Italy) C Giorgi	2	3
(Germany) A Kerber	6	6

== Qualifying ==
=== Seeds ===
1. (Russia) Ekaterina Makarova (moved to main draw)
2. (Estonia) Anett Kontaveit (first round, retired)
3. (Spain) Carla Suárez Navarro (first round)
4. (United States) Lauren Davis (first round)
5. (Germany) Carina Witthöft (qualifying competition, lucky loser)
6. (Greece) Maria Sakkari (first round)
7. (Puerto Rico) Monica Puig (qualifying competition)
8. (United States) Catherine Bellis (qualified)

=== Qualifiers ===
1. (United States) Catherine Bellis
2. (Italy) Camila Giorgi
3. (United States) Kristie Ahn
4. (Paraguay) Verónica Cepede Royg

=== Lucky losers ===
1. (Spain) Lara Arruabarrena
2. (Germany) Carina Witthöft

=== Qualifying draw ===
==== First qualifier ====
First round
Alt	(United States) Abigail Spears	2	6	3
(Canada) Gabriela Dabrowski	6	3	6
(Poland) Alicja Rosolska	0	0
(Russia) Ekaterina Alexandrova	6	6
(Slovakia) Kristína Kučová	6	6
(China) Yang Zhaoxuan	1	2
(United States) Jennifer Brady	6^{2}	5
8	(United States) Catherine Bellis	7^{7}	7

Second round
(Canada) Gabriela Dabrowski	2	7	4
(Russia) Ekaterina Alexandrova	6	5	6
(Slovakia) Kristína Kučová	5	2
8	(United States) Catherine Bellis	7	6

Qualifying competition
(Russia) Ekaterina Alexandrova	6	3	1
8	(United States) Catherine Bellis	3	6	6

==== Second qualifier ====
First round
2	(Estonia) Anett Kontaveit	5	6	0^{r}
(Japan) Shuko Aoyama	7	4	3
(Italy) Camila Giorgi	7	6
WC	(Australia) Olivia Tjandramulia	5	2
WC	(Australia) Belinda Woolcock	5	7	6
(China) Xu Yifan	7	5	3
(Australia) Anastasia Rodionova	1	4
5	(Germany) Carina Witthöft	6	6

Second round
(Japan) Shuko Aoyama	2	6^{5}
(Italy) Camila Giorgi	6	7^{7}
WC	(Australia) Belinda Woolcock	1	4
5	(Germany) Carina Witthöft	6	6

Qualifying competition
(Italy) Camila Giorgi	6	6
5	(Germany) Carina Witthöft	4	1

==== Third qualifier ====
First round
3	(Spain) Carla Suárez Navarro	1	4
(United States) Kristie Ahn	6	6
WC	(Australia) Tammi Patterson	3	6^{2}
(Sweden) Johanna Larsson	6	7^{7}
(China) Duan Yingying	6	6
(Australia) Isabelle Wallace	2	2
(France) Alizé Lim	2	2
7	(Puerto Rico) Monica Puig	6	6

Second round
(United States) Kristie Ahn	6	6
(Sweden) Johanna Larsson	1	2
(China) Duan Yingying	6	4	5
7	(Puerto Rico) Monica Puig	3	6	7

Qualifying competition
(United States) Kristie Ahn	6	6
7	(Puerto Rico) Monica Puig	4	1

==== Fourth qualifier ====
First round
4	(United States) Lauren Davis	4	4
(Spain) Lara Arruabarrena	6	6
WC	(Australia) Sara Tomic	2	7	6
(Tunisia) Ons Jabeur	6	5	4
(Ukraine) Kateryna Bondarenko	6^{4}	7^{8}	0
(United States) Christina McHale	7^{7}	6^{6}	0^{r}
(Paraguay) Verónica Cepede Royg	6	3	6
6	(Greece) Maria Sakkari	4	6	3

Second round
(Spain) Lara Arruabarrena	6	6
WC	(Australia) Sara Tomic	2	3
(Ukraine) Kateryna Bondarenko	6	3	6^{4}
(Paraguay) Verónica Cepede Royg	2	6	7^{7}

Qualifying competition
(Spain) Lara Arruabarrena	4	1
(Paraguay) Verónica Cepede Royg	6	6
