= 2018 Volvo Car Open – Singles =

Singles
- 2018 Volvo Car Open

Final
- Champion: (Netherlands) Kiki Bertens
- Runner-up: (Germany) Julia Görges
- Score: 6–2, 6–1

Details
- Draw: 56
- Seeds: 16

Events
Singles	Doubles
- Charleston Open

Daria Kasatkina was the defending champion, but lost in the quarterfinals to Julia Görges.

Kiki Bertens won the title, defeating Görges in the final, 6–2, 6–1. She saved a match point in the third set of her semifinal clash with Madison Keys.

== Seeds ==
The top eight seeds received a bye into the second round.

1. (France) Caroline Garcia (third round)
2. (Czech Republic) Petra Kvitová (second round)
3. (Russia) Daria Kasatkina (quarterfinals)
4. (United States) Sloane Stephens (withdrew)
5. (Germany) Julia Görges (final)
6. (United Kingdom) Johanna Konta (second round)
7. (United States) Madison Keys (semifinals)
8. (Latvia) Anastasija Sevastova (semifinals)

9. (Australia) Ashleigh Barty (third round)
10. (Japan) Naomi Osaka (third round)
11. (Australia) Daria Gavrilova (second round)
12. (Netherlands) Kiki Bertens (champion)
13. (Romania) Irina-Camelia Begu (third round)
14. (France) Alizé Cornet (quarterfinals)
15. (Romania) Mihaela Buzărnescu (second round)
16. (Russia) Elena Vesnina (third round)

Click on the seed number of a player to go to their draw section.

== Draw ==
Key

- Q = Qualifier
- WC = Wild card
- LL = Lucky loser
- Alt = Alternate
- ITF = ITF entry
- PR = Protected ranking
- SR = Special ranking
- SE = Special exempt
- JE = Junior exempt
- JR = Junior Accelerator Programme entrant
- CO = College Accelerator Programme entrant
- NG = Next Gen Accelerator Program entrant
- w/o = Walkover
- r = Retired
- d = Defaulted

=== Finals ===
Quarterfinals
14	(France) Alizé Cornet	2	5
12	(Netherlands) Kiki Bertens	6	7
(United States) Bernarda Pera	2	7^{7}	5
7	(United States) Madison Keys	6	6^{5}	7
5	(Germany) Julia Görges	6	6
3	(Russia) Daria Kasatkina	4	3
8	(Latvia) Anastasija Sevastova	6	6
(Czech Republic) Kristýna Plíšková	4	0

Semifinals
12	(Netherlands) Kiki Bertens	6	6^{2}	7^{7}
7	(United States) Madison Keys	4	7^{7}	6^{5}
5	(Germany) Julia Görges	7^{7}	6
8	(Latvia) Anastasija Sevastova	6^{5}	3

Final
12	(Netherlands) Kiki Bertens	6	6
5	(Germany) Julia Görges	2	1

=== Top half ===
==== Section 1 ====
First round
(United States) V Lepchenko	6	7
(Germany) A Petkovic	4	5
(Slovenia) P Hercog	6	6
Q	(Belgium) M Zanevska	1	4
(Ukraine) K Bondarenko	1	2
14	(France) A Cornet	6	6
12	(Netherlands) K Bertens	6	6
(Paraguay) V Cepede Royg	4	1
(Serbia) A Krunić	6	6
WC	(United States) B Mattek-Sands	2	2
Q	(Hungary) F Stollár	7	6
Q	(United States) F Di Lorenzo	5	1

Second round
1	(France) C Garcia	6	6
(United States) V Lepchenko	2	3
(Slovenia) P Hercog	2	3
14	(France) A Cornet	6	6
12	(Netherlands) K Bertens	6	6
(Serbia) A Krunić	4	2
Q	(Hungary) F Stollár	6	6
6	(United Kingdom) J Konta	3	4

Third round
1	(France) C Garcia	7	1	4
14	(France) A Cornet	5	6	6
12	(Netherlands) K Bertens	6	6
Q	(Hungary) F Stollár	2	4

Quarterfinals
14	(France) A Cornet	2	5
12	(Netherlands) K Bertens	6	7

==== Section 2 ====
First round
(United States) B Pera	6	6
(Slovakia) J Čepelová	2	2
(Canada) E Bouchard	4	4
WC	(Italy) S Errani	6	6
Q	(Belarus) V Lapko	4	0^{r}
15	(Romania) M Buzărnescu	6	0
11	(Australia) D Gavrilova	1	6	6
(Tunisia) O Jabeur	6	4	3
Q	(Spain) S Soler Espinosa	1	4
(Italy) C Giorgi	6	6
(Brazil) B Haddad Maia	6	6^{6}	0^{r}
(Spain) L Arruabarrena	4	7^{8}	1

Second round
LL	(Ukraine) D Yastremska	6^{4}	6	4
(United States) B Pera	7^{7}	1	6
WC	(Italy) S Errani	3	7^{7}	6
15	(Romania) M Buzărnescu	6	6^{5}	2
11	(Australia) D Gavrilova	2	6	3
(Italy) C Giorgi	6	2	6
(Spain) L Arruabarrena	1	6	3
7	(United States) M Keys	6	3	6

Third round
(United States) B Pera	6	2	6
WC	(Italy) S Errani	3	6	4
(Italy) C Giorgi	4	3
7	(United States) M Keys	6	6

Quarterfinals
(United States) B Pera	2	7^{7}	5
7	(United States) M Keys	6	6^{5}	7

=== Bottom half ===
==== Section 3 ====
First round
(United States) K Ahn	6	6
(Australia) S Stosur	2	4
(Germany) L Siegemund	7	6
(Russia) N Vikhlyantseva	5	2
(United States) J Brady	4	4
10	(Japan) N Osaka	6	6
13	(Romania) I-C Begu	6	6
Q	(Spain) G Garcia Pérez	3	4
Q	(United States) C Liu	1	6	6
(Poland) M Linette	6	3	3
(United States) C McHale	6	6
(Kazakhstan) Z Diyas	4	2

Second round
5	(Germany) J Görges	2	6	7^{7}
(United States) K Ahn	6	4	6^{1}
(Germany) L Siegemund	3	6^{8}
10	(Japan) N Osaka	6	7^{10}
13	(Romania) I-C Begu	6	6
Q	(United States) C Liu	4	2
(United States) C McHale	3	6	2
3	(Russia) D Kasatkina	6	3	6

Third round
5	(Germany) J Görges	7^{7}	6
10	(Japan) N Osaka	6^{4}	3
13	(Romania) I-C Begu	2	1
3	(Russia) D Kasatkina	6	6

Quarterfinals
5	(Germany) J Görges	6	6
3	(Russia) D Kasatkina	4	3

==== Section 4 ====
First round
(Sweden) J Larsson	7	0	4
Q	(United States) C Dolehide	5	6	6
(United States) L Davis	3	0
(Germany) T Maria	6	6
(United States) S Kenin	3	2
9	(Australia) A Barty	6	6
16	(Russia) E Vesnina	6	2	6
(United States) M Brengle	3	6	2
(United Kingdom) H Watson	3	4
(United States) T Townsend	6	6
(Czech Republic) K Siniaková	4	1
(Czech Republic) Kr Plíšková	6	6

Second round
8	(Latvia) A Sevastova	7	6^{5}	6
Q	(United States) C Dolehide	5	7^{7}	1
(Germany) T Maria	6	3	2
9	(Australia) A Barty	4	6	6
16	(Russia) E Vesnina	6	6
(United States) T Townsend	4	1
(Czech Republic) Kr Plíšková	1	6	6
2	(Czech Republic) P Kvitová	6	1	3

Third round
8	(Latvia) A Sevastova	6	6
9	(Australia) A Barty	3	4
16	(Russia) E Vesnina	3	6	2
(Czech Republic) Kr Plíšková	6	1	6

Quarterfinals
8	(Latvia) A Sevastova	6	6
(Czech Republic) Kr Plíšková	4	0

== Qualifying ==
=== Seeds ===
1. (Canada) Françoise Abanda (first round)
2. (Australia) Arina Rodionova (first round)
3. (Belarus) Vera Lapko (qualified)
4. (Switzerland) Jil Teichmann (first round)
5. (United States) Caroline Dolehide (qualified)
6. (Switzerland) Patty Schnyder (first round)
7. (Spain) Georgina García Pérez (qualified)
8. (Belgium) Maryna Zanevska (qualified)
9. (Ukraine) Dayana Yastremska (qualifying competition, lucky loser)
10. (Japan) Misaki Doi (qualifying competition)
11. (Romania) Irina Bara (qualifying competition)
12. (United States) Kayla Day (qualifying competition)
13. (Chile) Daniela Seguel (first round)
14. (Spain) Sílvia Soler Espinosa (qualified)
15. (United States) Grace Min (first round)
16. (Norway) Ulrikke Eikeri (qualifying competition)

=== Qualifiers ===
1. (United States) Francesca Di Lorenzo
2. (Spain) Sílvia Soler Espinosa
3. (Belarus) Vera Lapko
4. (Hungary) Fanny Stollár
5. (United States) Caroline Dolehide
6. (United States) Claire Liu
7. (Spain) Georgina García Pérez
8. (Belgium) Maryna Zanevska

=== Lucky loser ===
1. (Ukraine) Dayana Yastremska

=== Draw ===
==== First qualifier ====
First round
1	(Canada) Françoise Abanda	3	4
(United States) Francesca Di Lorenzo	6	6
(Russia) Alla Kudryavtseva	7	4	6
13	(Chile) Daniela Seguel	5	6	2

Qualifying competition
(United States) Francesca Di Lorenzo	4	6	6
(Russia) Alla Kudryavtseva	6	1	1

==== Second qualifier ====
First round
2	(Australia) Arina Rodionova	6	6^{5}	6^{2}
(United States) Sophie Chang	4	7^{7}	7^{7}
WC	(United States) Nicole Melichar	4	4
14	(Spain) Sílvia Soler Espinosa	6	6

Qualifying competition
(United States) Sophie Chang	6	1	1
14	(Spain) Sílvia Soler Espinosa	3	6	6

==== Third qualifier ====
First round
3	(Belarus) Vera Lapko	7^{6}	6
(Japan) Shuko Aoyama	6^{3}	4
WC	(United States) Jessica Pegula	3	6	6
15	(United States) Grace Min	6	2	1

Qualifying competition
3	(Belarus) Vera Lapko	7	6
WC	(United States) Jessica Pegula	5	4

==== Fourth qualifier ====
First round
4	(Switzerland) Jil Teichmann	5	6	6^{10}
(Hungary) Fanny Stollár	7	4	7^{12}
WC	(South Africa) Zoë Kruger	1	4
16	(Norway) Ulrikke Eikeri	6	6

Qualifying competition
(Hungary) Fanny Stollár	6	6
16	(Norway) Ulrikke Eikeri	1	4

==== Fifth qualifier ====
First round
5	(United States) Caroline Dolehide	6	7^{7}
(United States) Maria Sanchez	3	6^{5}
(China) Yang Zhaoxuan	1	7	4
10	(Japan) Misaki Doi	6	5	6

Qualifying competition
5	(United States) Caroline Dolehide	7^{9}	6
10	(Japan) Misaki Doi	6^{7}	3

==== Sixth qualifier ====
First round
6	(Switzerland) Patty Schnyder	6^{2}	4
(United States) Claire Liu	7^{7}	6
WC	(United States) Elizabeth Halbauer	2	5
11	(Romania) Irina Bara	6	7

Qualifying competition
(United States) Claire Liu	7^{7}	3	6
11	(Romania) Irina Bara	6^{5}	6	2

==== Seventh qualifier ====
First round
7	(Spain) Georgina García Pérez	6	7^{7}
(Hungary) Gréta Arn	2	6^{5}
(Australia) Anastasia Rodionova	6^{4}	7^{7}	4
12	(United States) Kayla Day	7^{7}	6^{0}	6

Qualifying competition
7	(Spain) Georgina García Pérez	6	6^{3}	6
12	(United States) Kayla Day	2	7^{7}	4

==== Eighth qualifier ====
First round
8	(Belgium) Maryna Zanevska	7	6
(Canada) Gabriela Dabrowski	5	1
(Bulgaria) Sesil Karatantcheva	7^{7}	4	4
9	(Ukraine) Dayana Yastremska	6^{1}	6	6

Qualifying competition
8	(Belgium) Maryna Zanevska	7^{7}	2	6
9	(Ukraine) Dayana Yastremska	6^{4}	6	3
