= 2013 Porsche Tennis Grand Prix – Singles =

Singles
- 2013 Porsche Tennis Grand Prix

Final
- Champion: (Russia) Maria Sharapova
- Runner-up: (China) Li Na
- Score: 6–4, 6–3

Details
- Draw: 28
- Seeds: 8

Events
| Singles | Doubles |
- Porsche Tennis Grand Prix

Maria Sharapova was the defending champion, and successfully defended her title, beating Li Na in the final, 6–4, 6–3.

== Seeds ==
The top four seeds receive a bye into the second round.

1. (Russia) Maria Sharapova (champion)
2. (China) Li Na (final)
3. (Germany) Angelique Kerber (semifinals)
4. (Italy) Sara Errani (second round)
5. (Czech Republic) Petra Kvitová (quarterfinals)
6. (Australia) Samantha Stosur (first round)
7. (Denmark) Caroline Wozniacki (first round)
8. (Russia) Nadia Petrova (second round)

== Draw ==
Key

- Q = Qualifier
- WC = Wild card
- LL = Lucky loser
- Alt = Alternate
- ITF = ITF entry
- PR = Protected ranking
- SR = Special ranking
- SE = Special exempt
- JE = Junior exempt
- JR = Junior Accelerator Programme entrant
- CO = College Accelerator Programme entrant
- NG = Next Gen Accelerator Program entrant
- w/o = Walkover
- r = Retired
- d = Defaulted

=== Finals ===
Semifinals
1 | (Russia) Maria Sharapova | 6 | 2 | 7
3 | (Germany) Angelique Kerber | 3 | 6 | 5
Q | (United States) Bethanie Mattek-Sands | 4 | 3
2 | (China) Li Na | 6 | 6

Final
1 | (Russia) Maria Sharapova | 6 | 6
2 | (China) Li Na | 4 | 3

=== Top half ===
First round
(Germany) M Barthel | 4 | 1
(Czech Republic) L Šafářová | 6 | 6
(Serbia) A Ivanovic | 6 | 6
WC | (Germany) A Petkovic | 3 | 2
Q | (Germany) D Pfizenmaier | 6^{2} | 4
8 | (Russia) N Petrova | 7^{7} | 6
(Russia) A Pavlyuchenkova | 6^{5} | 7 | 6
(Russia) E Makarova | 7^{7} | 5 | 4
(Kazakhstan) Y Shvedova | 6 | 6
(Italy) R Vinci | 4 | 2
(Spain) C Suárez Navarro | 7^{8} | 6
7 | (Denmark) C Wozniacki | 6^{6} | 1

Second round
1 | (Russia) M Sharapova | 6 | 6^{3} | 6
(Czech Republic) L Šafářová | 4 | 7^{7} | 3
(Serbia) A Ivanovic | 6 | 6
8 | (Russia) N Petrova | 4 | 3
3 | (Germany) A Kerber | 6 | 6
(Russia) A Pavlyuchenkova | 0 | 4
(Kazakhstan) Y Shvedova | 7 | 6
(Spain) C Suárez Navarro | 5 | 4

Quarterfinals
1 | (Russia) M Sharapova | 7 | 4 | 6
(Serbia) A Ivanovic | 5 | 6 | 4
3 | (Germany) A Kerber | 6 | 7^{7}
(Kazakhstan) Y Shvedova | 3 | 6^{2}

Semifinals
1 | (Russia) M Sharapova | 6 | 2 | 7
3 | (Germany) A Kerber | 3 | 6 | 5

=== Bottom half ===
First round
6 | (Australia) S Stosur | 4 | 4
(Serbia) J Janković | 6 | 6
(Germany) S Lisicki | 6 | 6
Q | (Italy) N Burnett | 3 | 4
Q | (United States) B Mattek-Sands | 6 | 6
(Belgium) Y Wickmayer | 2 | 1
5 | (Czech Republic) P Kvitová | 7 | 6^{0} | 6
WC | (Germany) A Beck | 5 | 7^{7} | 3
(Germany) J Görges | 6 | 2
(Belgium) K Flipkens | 2 | 1^{r}
(Russia) E Vesnina | 0 | 4
Q | (Croatia) M Lučić-Baroni | 6 | 6

Second round
(Serbia) J Janković | 6^{3} | 5
(Germany) S Lisicki | 7^{7} | 7
Q | (United States) B Mattek-Sands | 6 | 4 | 6
4 | (Italy) S Errani | 0 | 6 | 1
5 | (Czech Republic) P Kvitová | 2 | 7^{7} | 6
(Germany) J Görges | 6 | 6^{4} | 2
Q | (Croatia) M Lučić-Baroni | 1 | 2
2 | (China) N Li | 6 | 6

Quarterfinals
(Germany) S Lisicki | 4 | 2
Q | (United States) B Mattek-Sands | 6 | 6
5 | (Czech Republic) P Kvitová | 3 | 5
2 | (China) N Li | 6 | 7

Semifinals
Q | (United States) B Mattek-Sands | 4 | 3
2 | (China) N Li | 6 | 6

== Qualifying ==
=== Seeds ===
1. (China) Peng Shuai (second round)
2. (New Zealand) Marina Erakovic (first round)
3. (Spain) Garbiñe Muguruza (qualifying competition)
4. (Croatia) Mirjana Lučić-Baroni (qualified)
5. (Puerto Rico) Monica Puig (second round)
6. (United States) Bethanie Mattek-Sands (qualified)
7. (Israel) Shahar Pe'er (qualifying competition)
8. (Australia) Anastasia Rodionova (first round)

=== Qualifiers ===
1. (United States) Bethanie Mattek-Sands
2. (Germany) Dinah Pfizenmaier
3. (Italy) Nastassja Burnett
4. (Croatia) Mirjana Lučić-Baroni

=== Draw ===
==== First qualifier ====
First round
1 | (China) Peng Shuai | 7 | 6
(United States) Jill Craybas | 5 | 4
(Germany) Anna-Lena Friedsam | 6 | 6
(Germany) Anna Zaja | 1 | 2
(Germany) Kristina Barrois | 5 | 3
(Ukraine) Maryna Zanevska | 7 | 6
WC | (Germany) Julia Kimmelmann | 0 | 3
6 | (United States) Bethanie Mattek-Sands | 6 | 6

Second round
1 | (China) Peng Shuai | 1 | 5
(Germany) Anna-Lena Friedsam | 6 | 7
(Ukraine) Maryna Zanevska | 2 | 6 | 5
6 | (United States) Bethanie Mattek-Sands | 6 | 4 | 7

Qualifying competition
(Germany) Anna-Lena Friedsam | 3 | 4
6 | (United States) Bethanie Mattek-Sands | 6 | 6

==== Second qualifier ====
First round
2 | (New Zealand) Marina Erakovic | 1 | 6 | 5
(Colombia) Catalina Castaño | 6 | 1 | 7
(Czech Republic) Eva Birnerová | 6 | 4 | 6
(Israel) Julia Glushko | 2 | 6 | 4
(United States) Chiara Scholl | 4 | 6 | 1
(Germany) Kathrin Wörle-Scheller | 6 | 4 | 6
(Germany) Dinah Pfizenmaier | 6 | 6
8 | (Australia) Anastasia Rodionova | 2 | 4

Second round
(Colombia) Catalina Castaño | 6 | 7
(Czech Republic) Eva Birnerová | 4 | 5
(Germany) Kathrin Wörle-Scheller | 2 | 4
(Germany) Dinah Pfizenmaier | 6 | 6

Qualifying competition
(Colombia) Catalina Castaño | 6^{5} | 7 | 2
(Germany) Dinah Pfizenmaier | 7^{7} | 5 | 6

==== Third qualifier ====
First round
3 | (Spain) Garbiñe Muguruza | 6 | 6
WC | (Germany) Antonia Lottner | 1 | 4
(Bosnia and Herzegovina) Mervana Jugić-Salkić | 2 | 7 | 1
(Germany) Carina Witthöft | 6 | 5 | 6
(Slovakia) Zuzana Kučová | 0 | 2
(Italy) Nastassja Burnett | 6 | 6
WC | (Germany) Verena Schmid | 3 | 1
5 | (Puerto Rico) Monica Puig | 6 | 6

Second round
3 | (Spain) Garbiñe Muguruza | 6 | 6
(Germany) Carina Witthöft | 2 | 4
(Italy) Nastassja Burnett | 6 | 6
5 | (Puerto Rico) Monica Puig | 3 | 4

Qualifying competition
3 | (Spain) Garbiñe Muguruza | 4 | 5
(Italy) Nastassja Burnett | 6 | 7

==== Fourth qualifier ====
First round
4 | (Croatia) Mirjana Lučić-Baroni | 1 | 6 | 7
(Czech Republic) Barbora Záhlavová-Strýcová | 6 | 3 | 5
(Austria) Yvonne Meusburger | 6 | 6
(Hungary) Gréta Arn | 2 | 1
(Czech Republic) Sandra Záhlavová | 1 | 7 | 6
(Croatia) Tereza Mrdeža | 6 | 5 | 1
WC | (Germany) Laura Schaeder | 1 | 0
7 | (Israel) Shahar Pe'er | 6 | 6

Second round
4 | (Croatia) Mirjana Lučić-Baroni | 6 | 4 | 6
(Austria) Yvonne Meusburger | 3 | 6 | 2
(Czech Republic) Sandra Záhlavová | 7^{9} | 4 | 4
7 | (Israel) Shahar Pe'er | 6^{7} | 6 | 6

Qualifying competition
4 | (Croatia) Mirjana Lučić-Baroni | 6 | 6
7 | (Israel) Shahar Pe'er | 3 | 1
