= 2013 Aegon International – Women's singles =

Women's singles
- 2013 Aegon International

Final
- Champion: (Russia) Elena Vesnina
- Runner-up: (United States) Jamie Hampton
- Score: 6–2, 6–1

Events
Singles	men	women
Doubles	men	women
← 2012 ·	Aegon International	· 2014 →

Tamira Paszek was the defending champion, but retired in the first round with a thigh injury against Caroline Wozniacki.

Elena Vesnina won the title, defeating Jamie Hampton in the final 6–2, 6–1.

== Seeds ==
1. (Poland) Agnieszka Radwańska (first round)
2. (China) Li Na (quarterfinals)
3. (Germany) Angelique Kerber (second round)
4. (Czech Republic) Petra Kvitová (second round)
5. (Denmark) Caroline Wozniacki (semifinals)
6. (Russia) Maria Kirilenko (quarterfinals)
7. (Serbia) Ana Ivanovic (first round)
8. (Russia) Nadia Petrova (first round)

== Draw ==
=== Key ===
- Q = Qualifier
- WC = Wild card
- LL = Lucky loser
- Alt = Alternate
- ITF = ITF entry
- PR = Protected ranking
- SR = Special ranking
- SE = Special exempt
- JE = Junior exempt
- JR = Junior Accelerator Programme entrant
- CO = College Accelerator Programme entrant
- NG = Next Gen Accelerator Program entrant
- w/o = Walkover
- r = Retired
- d = Defaulted

=== Finals ===
Semifinals
Q	(United States) Jamie Hampton	6^{8}	7	6
5	(Denmark) Caroline Wozniacki	7^{10}	5	3
(Belgium) Yanina Wickmayer	2	0
(Russia) Elena Vesnina	6	6

Final
Q	(United States) Jamie Hampton	2	1
(Russia) Elena Vesnina	6	6

=== Top half ===
First round
1	(Poland) A Radwańska	6^{2}	2
Q	(United States) J Hampton	7^{7}	6
WC	(United Kingdom) J Konta	4	3
(Chinese Taipei) S-w Hsieh	6	6
(Czech Republic) K Zakopalová	4	6^{3}
(Czech Republic) L Šafářová	6	7^{7}
WC	(Australia) S Stosur	6	6
8	(Russia) N Petrova	2	3
3	(Germany) A Kerber	6	6
(Romania) S Cîrstea	4	4
Q	(Russia) O Puchkova	3	0
(Russia) E Makarova	6	6
Q	(Ukraine) Y Beygelzimer	3	2
(United Kingdom) L Robson	6	6
(Austria) T Paszek	2	2^{r}
5	(Denmark) C Wozniacki	6	2

Second round
Q	(United States) J Hampton	6	7^{7}
(Chinese Taipei) S-w Hsieh	4	6^{2}
(Czech Republic) L Šafářová	7^{7}	6
WC	(Australia) S Stosur	6^{5}	3
3	(Germany) A Kerber	3	4
(Russia) E Makarova	6	6
(United Kingdom) L Robson	4	4
5	(Denmark) C Wozniacki	6	6

Quarterfinals
Q	(United States) J Hampton	3	7^{7}	6
(Czech Republic) L Šafářová	6	6^{1}	4
(Russia) E Makarova	6	0	3
5	(Denmark) C Wozniacki	4	6	6

Semifinals
Q	(United States) J Hampton	6^{8}	7	6
5	(Denmark) C Wozniacki	7^{10}	5	3

=== Bottom half ===
First round
6	(Russia) M Kirilenko	7^{7}	6
(Serbia) B Jovanovski	6^{5}	1
WC	(United Kingdom) E Baltacha	7	7^{7}
Q	(Czech Republic) Kr Plíšková	5	6^{3}
(United States) C McHale	3	4
(Belgium) Y Wickmayer	6	6
(Romania) M Niculescu	4	1
4	(Czech Republic) P Kvitová	6	6
7	(Serbia) A Ivanovic	6	4	3
(Russia) E Vesnina	2	6	6
(United States) V Lepchenko	3	4
(United Kingdom) H Watson	6	6
PR	(Italy) F Pennetta	3	2
(France) M Bartoli	6	6
(France) A Cornet	2	4
2/WC	(China) N Li	6	6

Second round
6	(Russia) M Kirilenko	4	6	6
WC	(United Kingdom) E Baltacha	6	4	3
(Belgium) Y Wickmayer	3	6	7
4	(Czech Republic) P Kvitová	6	4	5
(Russia) E Vesnina	6	3	6
(United Kingdom) H Watson	1	6	2
(France) M Bartoli
2/WC	(China) N Li	w/o

Quarterfinals
6	(Russia) M Kirilenko	2	6	5
(Belgium) Y Wickmayer	6	1	7
(Russia) E Vesnina	7^{7}	6
2/WC	(China) N Li	6^{4}	3

Semifinals
(Belgium) Y Wickmayer	2	0
(Russia) E Vesnina	6	6

== Qualifying ==
=== Seeds ===
1. (United States) Jamie Hampton (qualified)
2. (United States) Madison Keys (second round)
3. (Slovakia) Jana Čepelová (qualifying competition)
4. (Puerto Rico) Monica Puig (second round)
5. (Canada) Eugenie Bouchard (second round)
6. (New Zealand) Marina Erakovic (withdrew)
7. (Czech Republic) Karolína Plíšková (qualifying competition)
8. (Luxembourg) Mandy Minella (first round)

=== Qualifiers ===
1. (United States) Jamie Hampton
2. (Czech Republic) Kristýna Plíšková
3. (Ukraine) Yuliya Beygelzimer
4. (Russia) Olga Puchkova

=== Draw ===
==== First qualifier ====
First round
1	(United States) Jamie Hampton	6	6
WC	(United Kingdom) Amanda Carreras	0	4
(Hungary) Tímea Babos	4	4
(Spain) Lara Arruabarrena	6	6
(Croatia) Mirjana Lučić-Baroni	6	7^{7}
(Russia) Ekaterina Bychkova	1	6^{5}
(Canada) Gabriela Dabrowski	7	6
8	(Luxembourg) Mandy Minella	5	1

Second round
1	(United States) Jamie Hampton	6	6
(Spain) Lara Arruabarrena	2	2
(Croatia) Mirjana Lučić-Baroni	5	6	1
(Canada) Gabriela Dabrowski	7	4	6

Qualifying competition
1	(United States) Jamie Hampton	6	6
(Canada) Gabriela Dabrowski	2	1

==== Second qualifier ====
First round
2	(United States) Madison Keys	6	6
WC	(United Kingdom) Emily Webley-Smith	0	4
(Czech Republic) Kristýna Plíšková	6^{3}	6	6
(United States) Jill Craybas	7^{7}	1	3
(United Kingdom) Anne Keothavong	4	3
(United Kingdom) Tara Moore	6	6
(Japan) Misaki Doi	6^{3}	2
7	(Czech Republic) Karolína Plíšková	7^{7}	6

Second round
2	(United States) Madison Keys	6	4	4
(Czech Republic) Kristýna Plíšková	4	6	6
(United Kingdom) Tara Moore	4	6	6^{2}
7	(Czech Republic) Karolína Plíšková	6	2	7^{7}

Qualifying competition
(Czech Republic) Kristýna Plíšková	7^{7}	3	6
7	(Czech Republic) Karolína Plíšková	6^{5}	6	3

==== Third qualifier ====
First round
3	(Slovakia) Jana Čepelová	7^{8}	3	6
(Ukraine) Elina Svitolina	6^{6}	6	2
(Portugal) Maria João Koehler	6	6^{5}	6
(Georgia (country)) Anna Tatishvili	2	7^{7}	4
(Ukraine) Yuliya Beygelzimer	6	6
WC	(United Kingdom) Anna Fitzpatrick	2	1
WC	(United Kingdom) Lucy Brown	3	3
5	(Canada) Eugenie Bouchard	6	6

Second round
3	(Slovakia) Jana Čepelová	7^{7}	6
(Portugal) Maria João Koehler	6^{5}	4
(Ukraine) Yuliya Beygelzimer	2	6	6
5	(Canada) Eugenie Bouchard	6	4	4

Qualifying competition
3	(Slovakia) Jana Čepelová	1	6^{4}
(Ukraine) Yuliya Beygelzimer	6	7^{7}

==== Fourth qualifier ====
First round
4	(Puerto Rico) Monica Puig	6	5	6
(Slovenia) Petra Rampre	2	7	0
(Italy) Karin Knapp	7^{10}	1	2
(United States) Melanie Oudin	6^{8}	6	6
(Israel) Shahar Pe'er	3	2
(Russia) Olga Puchkova	6	6
(Czech Republic) Lucie Hradecká	6	6
Alt	(Poland) Alicja Rosolska	3	1

Second round
4	(Puerto Rico) Monica Puig	0	4
(United States) Melanie Oudin	6	6
(Russia) Olga Puchkova	2	6	7^{7}
(Czech Republic) Lucie Hradecká	6	3	6^{0}

Qualifying competition
(United States) Melanie Oudin	5	6	4
(Russia) Olga Puchkova	7	3	6
