= 2013 Aegon International =

- Date: 17–22 June
- Edition: 5th (men); 39th (women)
- Category: ATP World Tour 250 (men); WTA Premier (women)
- Draw: 28S / 16D; 32S / 16D
- Prize money: €519,310 $690,000
- Surface: Grass
- Location: Eastbourne, United Kingdom
- Venue: Devonshire Park LTC

Champions

Men's singles
- (Spain) Feliciano López

Women's singles
- (Russia) Elena Vesnina

Men's doubles
- (Austria) Alexander Peya / (Brazil) Bruno Soares

Women's doubles
- (Russia) Nadia Petrova / (Slovenia) Katarina Srebotnik
- Aegon International

The 2013 Aegon International was a combined men's and women's tennis tournament played on outdoor grass courts. It was the 39th edition of the event for the women and the 5th edition for the men. It was classified as a WTA Premier tournament on the 2013 WTA Tour and as an ATP World Tour 250 series on the 2013 ATP World Tour. The event took place at the Devonshire Park Lawn Tennis Club in Eastbourne, United Kingdom from 17 June through 22 June 2013.

== Finals ==
=== Men's singles ===
- (Spain) Feliciano López defeated (France) Gilles Simon, 7–6^{(7–2)}, 6–7^{(5–7)}, 6–0
- It was the third title of his career for Lopez, his first since 2010 and his first in a grass court tournament.

=== Women's singles ===
- (Russia) Elena Vesnina defeated (United States) Jamie Hampton, 6–2, 6–1
- It was Vesnina second title of the year and the second of her career, her first being at Hobart International.

=== Men's doubles ===
- (Austria) Alexander Peya / (Brazil) Bruno Soares defeated (United Kingdom) Colin Fleming / (United Kingdom) Jonathan Marray, 3–6, 6–3, [10–8]

=== Women's doubles ===
- (Russia) Nadia Petrova / (Slovenia) Katarina Srebotnik defeated (Romania) Monica Niculescu / (Czech Republic) Klára Zakopalová, 6–3, 6–3

== Points and prize money ==
=== Point distribution ===
Event	W	F	SF	QF	Round of 16	Round of 32	Q	Q3	Q2	Q1
Men's singles	250	150	90	45	20	0	12	6	0	0
Men's doubles	250	150	90	45	0	—N/a	—N/a	—N/a	—N/a	—N/a
Women's singles	470	320	200	120	60	1	20	12	8	1
Women's doubles	470	320	200	120	1	—N/a	—N/a	—N/a	—N/a	—N/a

=== Prize money ===
Event	W	F	SF	QF	Round of 16	Round of 32	Q3	Q2	Q1
Men's singles	€84,550	€44,540	€24,125	€13,745	€8,100	€4,800	€775	€370	—N/a
Men's doubles *	€25,700	€13,500	€7,320	€4,910	€2,450	—N/a	—N/a	—N/a	—N/a
Women's singles	$117,000	$62,300	$33,250	$17,850	$9,550	$4,590	$2,720	$1,450	$805
Women's doubles *	$36,500	$19,480	$10,650	$5,425	$2,940	—N/a	—N/a	—N/a	—N/a

_{* per team}

== ATP singles main-draw entrants ==
=== Seeds ===
Country	Player	Rank^{1}	Seed
CAN	Milos Raonic	15	1
FRA	Gilles Simon	17	2
GER	Philipp Kohlschreiber	18	3
ARG	Juan Mónaco	20	4
RSA	Kevin Anderson	23	5
UKR	Alexandr Dolgopolov	24	6
ITA	Andreas Seppi	26	7
ITA	Fabio Fognini	31	8

- ^{1} Seedings are based on the rankings as of 10 June 2013.

=== Other entrants ===
The following players received wildcards into the main draw:

- (United Kingdom) Kyle Edmund
- (Canada) Milos Raonic
- (United Kingdom) James Ward

The following players received entry from the qualifying draw:

- (United States) James Blake
- (France) Kenny de Schepper
- (United States) Ryan Harrison
- (France) Guillaume Rufin

=== Withdrawals ===
Before the tournament

- (Brazil) Thomaz Bellucci

== ATP doubles main-draw entrants ==
=== Seeds ===
Country	Player	Country	Player	Rank^{1}	Seed
AUT	Alexander Peya	BRA	Bruno Soares	15	1
SWE	Robert Lindstedt	CAN	Daniel Nestor	26	2
IND	Leander Paes	CZE	Radek Štěpánek	27	3
GBR	Colin Fleming	GBR	Jonathan Marray	42	4

- Rankings are as of 10 June 2013.

=== Other entrants ===
The following pairs received wildcards into the doubles main draw:

- (United Kingdom) Jamie Delgado / (United Kingdom) James Ward
- (United Kingdom) Kyle Edmund / (United Kingdom) Sean Thornley

== WTA singles main-draw entrants ==
=== Seeds ===
Country	Player	Rank^{1}	Seed
POL	Agnieszka Radwańska	4	1
CHN	Li Na	6	2
GER	Angelique Kerber	7	3
CZE	Petra Kvitová	8	4
DEN	Caroline Wozniacki	9	5
RUS	Maria Kirilenko	10	6
SRB	Ana Ivanovic	12	7
RUS	Nadia Petrova	13	8

- ^{1} Rankings are as of 10 June 2013.

=== Other entrants ===
The following players received wildcards into the main draw:

- (Australia) Samantha Stosur
- (United Kingdom) Johanna Konta
- (United Kingdom) Elena Baltacha

The following players received entry from the qualifying draw:

- (Ukraine) Yuliya Beygelzimer
- (United States) Jamie Hampton
- (Czech Republic) Kristýna Plíšková
- (Russia) Olga Puchkova

=== Withdrawals ===
Before the tournament

- (Italy) Sara Errani
- (Kazakhstan) Yaroslava Shvedova
- (United States) Sloane Stephens

=== Retirements ===
- (Austria) Tamira Paszek (thigh injury)
- (France) Marion Bartoli (viral illness)

== WTA doubles main-draw entrants ==
=== Seeds ===
Country	Player	Country	Player	Rank^{1}	Seed
RUS	Nadia Petrova	SLO	Katarina Srebotnik	11	1
USA	Liezel Huber	IND	Sania Mirza	26	2
GER	Anna-Lena Grönefeld	CZE	Květa Peschke	38	3
ITA	Flavia Pennetta	RUS	Elena Vesnina	53	4

- ^{1} Rankings are as of 10 June 2013.

=== Other entrants ===
The following pairs received wildcards into the doubles main draw:

- (Czech Republic) Petra Kvitová / (Belgium) Yanina Wickmayer
- (United Kingdom) Anne Keothavong / (United Kingdom) Samantha Murray
