= 2012 Aegon International =

- Date: 16–23 June
- Edition: 4th (men); 38th (women)
- Category: ATP World Tour 250 (men); WTA Premier (women)
- Surface: Grass
- Location: Eastbourne, United Kingdom
- Venue: Devonshire Park LTC

Champions

Men's singles
- (United States) Andy Roddick

Women's singles
- (Austria) Tamira Paszek

Men's doubles
- (United Kingdom) Colin Fleming / (United Kingdom) Ross Hutchins

Women's doubles
- (Spain) Nuria Llagostera Vives / (Spain) María José Martínez Sánchez
- Aegon International

The 2012 Aegon International was a combined men's and women's tennis tournament played on outdoor grass courts. It was the 38th edition of the event for the women and the 4th edition for the men. It was classified as a WTA Premier tournament on the 2012 WTA Tour and as an ATP World Tour 250 series on the 2012 ATP World Tour. The event took place at the Devonshire Park Lawn Tennis Club in Eastbourne, United Kingdom from 16 June through 23 June 2012. Andy Roddick and Tamira Paszek won the singles titles.

== Finals ==
=== Men's singles ===
(United States) Andy Roddick defeated (Italy) Andreas Seppi, 6–3, 6–2

=== Women's singles ===
(Austria) Tamira Paszek defeated (Germany) Angelique Kerber, 5–7, 6–3, 7–5

=== Men's doubles ===
(United Kingdom) Colin Fleming / (United Kingdom) Ross Hutchins defeated (United Kingdom) Jamie Delgado / (United Kingdom) Ken Skupski, 6–4, 6–3

=== Women's doubles ===
(Spain) Nuria Llagostera Vives / (Spain) María José Martínez Sánchez defeated (United States) Liezel Huber / (United States) Lisa Raymond, 6–4, ret.

== ATP singles main draw entrants ==
=== Seeds ===
| Country | Player | Rank^{1} | Seed |
|---|---|---|---|
| FRA | Richard Gasquet | 19 | 1 |
| ESP | Marcel Granollers | 22 | 2 |
| ITA | Andreas Seppi | 24 | 3 |
| AUS | Bernard Tomic | 27 | 4 |
| FRA | Julien Benneteau | 28 | 5 |
| USA | Andy Roddick | 32 | 6 |
| GER | Philipp Kohlschreiber | 34 | 7 |
| ESP | Pablo Andújar | 36 | 8 |

- ^{1} Seedings are based on the rankings as of 11 June 2012

=== Other entrants ===
The following players received wildcards into the main draw:

- (United Kingdom) Jamie Baker
- (United States) Andy Roddick
- (United Kingdom) James Ward

The following players received a special exempt into the main draw:

- (United States) Sam Querrey

The following players qualified for the main draw:

- (Australia) Matthew Ebden
- (France) Paul-Henri Mathieu
- (Australia) Marinko Matosevic
- (Canada) Vasek Pospisil

=== Retirements ===
- (Belgium) Steve Darcis (back injury)
- (Germany) Philipp Kohlschreiber (ankle injury)
- (United States) Sam Querrey (back injury)

== ATP doubles main draw entrants ==
=== Seeds ===
| Country | Player | Country | Player | Rank^{1} | Seed |
|---|---|---|---|---|---|
| POL | Mariusz Fyrstenberg | POL | Marcin Matkowski | 17 | 1 |
| ESP | Marcel Granollers | ESP | Marc López | 35 | 2 |
| GBR | Colin Fleming | GBR | Ross Hutchins | 61 | 3 |
| PHI | Treat Conrad Huey | AUT | Oliver Marach | 65 | 4 |

- Rankings are as of 11 June 2012

=== Other entrants ===
The following pairs received wildcards into the doubles main draw:

- (United Kingdom) Jamie Delgado / (United Kingdom) Ken Skupski
- (United Kingdom) Dominic Inglot / (United Kingdom) Jonathan Marray

== WTA singles main draw entrants ==
=== Seeds ===
| Country | Player | Rank^{1} | Seed |
|---|---|---|---|
| POL | Agnieszka Radwańska | 3 | 1 |
| CZE | Petra Kvitová | 4 | 2 |
| DEN | Caroline Wozniacki | 7 | 3 |
| FRA | Marion Bartoli | 8 | 4 |
| GER | Angelique Kerber | 9 | 5 |
| ~~SRB~~ | ~~Ana Ivanovic~~ | ~~14~~ | ~~6~~ |
| CZE | Lucie Šafářová | 21 | 7 |
| SVK | Daniela Hantuchová | 24 | 8 |
| CZE | Petra Cetkovská | 26 | 9 |

- ^{1} Seedings are based on the rankings as of 11 June 2012

=== Other entrants ===
The following players received wildcards into the main draw:

- (United Kingdom) Anne Keothavong
- (United Kingdom) Heather Watson

The following player qualified for the main draw:

- (Hungary) Gréta Arn
- (Canada) Stéphanie Dubois
- (United Kingdom) Laura Robson
- (Russia) Elena Vesnina

The following player received entry as lucky loser:

- (Czech Republic) Andrea Hlaváčková

=== Withdrawals ===
- (Serbia) Ana Ivanovic (right hip injury)
- (Estonia) Kaia Kanepi (heels)
- (China) Peng Shuai
- (Russia) Vera Zvonareva

=== Retirements ===
- (Chinese Taipei) Hsieh Su-wei (low back injury)

== WTA doubles main draw entrants ==
=== Seeds ===
| Country | Player | Country | Player | Rank^{1} | Seed |
|---|---|---|---|---|---|
| USA | Liezel Huber | USA | Lisa Raymond | 2 | 1 |
| CZE | Květa Peschke | SLO | Katarina Srebotnik | 11 | 2 |
| RUS | Ekaterina Makarova | RUS | Elena Vesnina | 28 | 3 |
| ESP | Nuria Llagostera Vives | ESP | María José Martínez Sánchez | 42 | 4 |

- ^{1} Rankings are as of 11 June 2012

=== Retirements ===
- (United Kingdom) Elena Baltacha (neck injury)
- (United States) Liezel Huber (right thigh injury)
- (Argentina) Paola Suárez (lumbar spine injury)
- (Chinese Taipei) Hsieh Su-wei (low back injury)
