= 2013 Aegon International – Men's doubles =

Men's doubles
- 2013 Aegon International

Final
- Champions: (Austria) Alexander Peya (Brazil) Bruno Soares
- Runners-up: (United Kingdom) Colin Fleming (United Kingdom) Jonathan Marray
- Score: 3–6, 6–3, [10–8]

Events
Singles	men	women
Doubles	men	women
← 2012 ·	Aegon International	· 2014 →

Colin Fleming and Ross Hutchins were the defending champions, but could not compete together this year due to Hutchins being out with ongoing illness.
Fleming competed alongside fellow Brit Jonathan Marray but lost in the final against top seeds Alexander Peya and Bruno Soares, 6–3, 3–6, [8–10].

== Seeds ==
1. (Austria) Alexander Peya / (Brazil) Bruno Soares (champions)
2. (Sweden) Robert Lindstedt / (Canada) Daniel Nestor (first round)
3. (India) Leander Paes / (Czech Republic) Radek Štěpánek (quarterfinals)
4. (United Kingdom) Colin Fleming / (United Kingdom) Jonathan Marray (final)

== Draw ==
=== Key ===
- Q = Qualifier
- WC = Wild card
- LL = Lucky loser
- Alt = Alternate
- ITF = ITF entry
- PR = Protected ranking
- SR = Special ranking
- SE = Special exempt
- JE = Junior exempt
- JR = Junior Accelerator Programme entrant
- CO = College Accelerator Programme entrant
- NG = Next Gen Accelerator Program entrant
- w/o = Walkover
- r = Retired
- d = Defaulted

=== Draw ===
First round
1	(Austria) A Peya (Brazil) B Soares	6	7^{7}
(Colombia) JS Cabal (Colombia) R Farah	3	6^{5}
(Slovakia) M Kližan (Australia) M Matosevic	3	7^{8}	[10]
(Uzbekistan) D Istomin (Argentina) J Mónaco	6	6^{6}	[2]
3	(India) L Paes (Czech Republic) R Štěpánek	5	7^{7}	[10]
(Croatia) I Dodig (Brazil) M Melo	7	6^{5}	[6]
(United Kingdom) J Murray (Australia) J Peers	6	6
(Italy) F Fognini (Italy) A Seppi	3	4
WC	(United Kingdom) K Edmund (United Kingdom) S Thornley	6	6^{7}	[6]
PR	(United States) E Butorac (Israel) A Ram	4	7^{9}	[10]
WC	(United Kingdom) J Delgado (United Kingdom) J Ward	6^{3}	4
4	(United Kingdom) C Fleming (United Kingdom) J Marray	7^{7}	6
(Poland) T Bednarek (Germany) P Marx	6	4	[8]
(Australia) P Hanley (United Kingdom) K Skupski	2	6	[10]
(Poland) M Matkowski (Denmark) F Nielsen	6	6
2	(Sweden) R Lindstedt (Canada) D Nestor	2	3

Quarterfinals
1	(Austria) A Peya (Brazil) B Soares	6	7
(Slovakia) M Kližan (Australia) M Matosevic	4	5
3	(India) L Paes (Czech Republic) R Štěpánek	6	3	[5]
(United Kingdom) J Murray (Australia) J Peers	1	6	[10]
PR	(United States) E Butorac (Israel) A Ram	5	6^{2}
4	(United Kingdom) C Fleming (United Kingdom) J Marray	7	7^{7}
(Australia) P Hanley (United Kingdom) K Skupski	5	6^{3}
(Poland) M Matkowski (Denmark) F Nielsen	7	7^{7}

Semifinals
1	(Austria) A Peya (Brazil) B Soares	6	6
(United Kingdom) J Murray (Australia) J Peers	4	4
4	(United Kingdom) C Fleming (United Kingdom) J Marray	3	6	[11]
(Poland) M Matkowski (Denmark) F Nielsen	6	3	[9]

Final
1	(Austria) A Peya (Brazil) B Soares	3	6	[10]
4	(United Kingdom) C Fleming (United Kingdom) J Marray	6	3	[8]
