= 2012 Aegon International – Women's doubles =

Women's doubles
- 2012 Aegon International

Final
- Champion: (Spain) Nuria Llagostera Vives (Spain) María José Martínez Sánchez
- Runner-up: (United States) Liezel Huber (United States) Lisa Raymond
- Score: 6–4, ret.

Details
- Draw: 16
- Seeds: 4

Events
Singles	men	women
Doubles	men	women
← 2011 ·	Eastbourne International	· 2013 →

Květa Peschke and Katarina Srebotnik were the defending champions but lost in the Semifinals to Nuria Llagostera Vives and María José Martínez Sánchez.
The Spaniard couple won the title by beating Liezel Huber and Lisa Raymond in the final who retired after the first set lost 4–6.

== Seeds ==
1. (United States) Liezel Huber / (United States) Lisa Raymond (final, retired)
2. (Czech Republic) Květa Peschke / (Slovenia) Katarina Srebotnik (semifinals)
3. (Russia) Ekaterina Makarova / (Russia) Elena Vesnina (first round)
4. (Spain) Nuria Llagostera Vives / (Spain) María José Martínez Sánchez (champions)

== Draw ==
=== Key ===
- Q = Qualifier
- WC = Wild card
- LL = Lucky loser
- Alt = Alternate
- SE = Special exempt
- PR = Protected ranking
- ITF = ITF entry
- JE = Junior exempt
- w/o = Walkover
- r = Retired
- d = Defaulted
- SR = Special ranking

=== Draw ===
First round
1	(United States) L Huber (United States) L Raymond	2	6	[10]
(New Zealand) M Erakovic (Thailand) T Tanasugarn	6	3	[7]
(Russia) A Pavlyuchenkova (Czech Republic) L Šafářová	2	3
(United Kingdom) L Robson (United Kingdom) H Watson	6	6
3	(Russia) E Makarova (Russia) E Vesnina	6^{4}	6	[7]
(Germany) A-L Grönefeld (Czech Republic) K Zakopalová	7^{7}	4	[10]
(Slovakia) D Hantuchová (China) J Zheng	6
(India) S Mirza (Argentina) P Suárez	2	r
(South Africa) N Grandin (Czech Republic) V Uhlířová	7	6
(Chinese Taipei) C-j Chuang (Russia) V Dushevina	5	2
(United Kingdom) E Baltacha (United Kingdom) A Keothavong
4	(Spain) N Llagostera Vives (Spain) MJ Martínez Sánchez	w/o
(Hungary) T Babos (Chinese Taipei) S-w Hsieh
(Poland) K Jans-Ignacik (Poland) A Rosolska	w/o
(Czech Republic) A Hlaváčková (Kazakhstan) G Voskoboeva	5	3
2	(Czech Republic) K Peschke (Slovenia) K Srebotnik	7	6

Quarterfinals
1	(United States) L Huber (United States) L Raymond	6	7^{7}
(United Kingdom) L Robson (United Kingdom) H Watson	4	6^{3}
(Germany) A-L Grönefeld (Czech Republic) K Zakopalová	6	7
(Slovakia) D Hantuchová (China) J Zheng	4	5
(South Africa) N Grandin (Czech Republic) V Uhlířová	4	4
4	(Spain) N Llagostera Vives (Spain) MJ Martínez Sánchez	6	6
(Poland) K Jans-Ignacik (Poland) A Rosolska	1	4
2	(Czech Republic) K Peschke (Slovenia) K Srebotnik	6	6

Semifinals
1	(United States) L Huber (United States) L Raymond	6	6
(Germany) A-L Grönefeld (Czech Republic) K Zakopalová	2	2
4	(Spain) N Llagostera Vives (Spain) MJ Martínez Sánchez	7^{7}	6
2	(Czech Republic) K Peschke (Slovenia) K Srebotnik	6^{5}	4

Final
1	(United States) L Huber (United States) L Raymond	4	r
4	(Spain) N Llagostera Vives (Spain) MJ Martínez Sánchez	6
