= 2013 Aegon International – Women's doubles =

Women's doubles
- 2013 Aegon International

Final
- Champions: (Russia) Nadia Petrova (Slovenia) Katarina Srebotnik
- Runners-up: (Romania) Monica Niculescu (Czech Republic) Klára Zakopalová
- Score: 6–3, 6–3

Details
- Draw: 16
- Seeds: 4

Events
Singles	men	women
Doubles	men	women
← 2012 ·	Eastbourne International	· 2014 →

Nuria Llagostera Vives and María José Martínez Sánchez were the defending champions, but they chose not to compete this year.
First seeded Nadia Petrova and Katarina Srebotnik defeated Monica Niculescu and Klára Zakopalová in the final with the score 6–3, 6–3.

== Seeds ==
1. (Russia) Nadia Petrova / (Slovenia) Katarina Srebotnik (champions)
2. (United States) Liezel Huber / (India) Sania Mirza (quarterfinals)
3. (Germany) Anna-Lena Grönefeld / (Czech Republic) Květa Peschke (semifinals)
4. (Italy) Flavia Pennetta / (Russia) Elena Vesnina (semifinals)

== Draw ==
=== Key ===
- Q = Qualifier
- WC = Wild card
- LL = Lucky loser
- Alt = Alternate
- SE = Special exempt
- PR = Protected ranking
- ITF = ITF entry
- JE = Junior exempt
- w/o = Walkover
- r = Retired
- d = Defaulted
- SR = Special ranking

=== Draw ===
First round
1	(Russia) N Petrova (Slovenia) K Srebotnik	4	6	[10]
(United States) L Raymond (United Kingdom) L Robson	6	4	[5]
WC	(Czech Republic) P Kvitová (Belgium) Y Wickmayer	1	4
(Croatia) M Lučić-Baroni (Chinese Taipei) S-w Hsieh	6	6
4	(Italy) F Pennetta (Russia) E Vesnina	6	7
(Zimbabwe) C Black (New Zealand) M Erakovic	2	5
(Chinese Taipei) Chan H-C (Czech Republic) L Šafářová	2	6	[10]
(Slovakia) J Husárová (United States) V Lepchenko	6	2	[7]
(South Africa) N Grandin (Czech Republic) V Uhlířová	5	4
(Georgia (country)) O Kalashnikova (Poland) A Rosolska	7	6
WC	(United Kingdom) A Keothavong (United Kingdom) S Murray	4	3
3	(Germany) A-L Grönefeld (Czech Republic) K Peschke	6	6
(Romania) M Niculescu (Czech Republic) K Zakopalová	6	6
(Hungary) T Babos (Luxembourg) M Minella	4	3
(Croatia) D Jurak (United Kingdom) H Watson	6^{4}	6^{3}
2	(United States) L Huber (India) S Mirza	7^{7}	7^{7}

Quarterfinals
1	(Russia) N Petrova (Slovenia) K Srebotnik	6	7
(Croatia) M Lučić-Baroni (Chinese Taipei) S-w Hsieh	2	5
4	(Italy) F Pennetta (Russia) E Vesnina	6	6
(Chinese Taipei) Chan H-C (Czech Republic) L Šafářová	4	1
(Georgia (country)) O Kalashnikova (Poland) A Rosolska	4	3
3	(Germany) A-L Grönefeld (Czech Republic) K Peschke	6	6
(Romania) M Niculescu (Czech Republic) K Zakopalová	6	3	[11]
2	(United States) L Huber (India) S Mirza	3	6	[9]

Semifinals
1	(Russia) N Petrova (Slovenia) K Srebotnik	7^{7}	6
4	(Italy) F Pennetta (Russia) E Vesnina	6^{3}	2
3	(Germany) A-L Grönefeld (Czech Republic) K Peschke	6	3	[1]
(Romania) M Niculescu (Czech Republic) K Zakopalová	4	6	[10]

Final
1	(Russia) N Petrova (Slovenia) K Srebotnik	6	6
(Romania) M Niculescu (Czech Republic) K Zakopalová	3	3
