= 2012 Aegon International – Men's singles =

Men's singles
- 2012 Aegon International

Final
- Champion: (United States) Andy Roddick
- Runner-up: (Italy) Andreas Seppi
- Score: 6–3, 6–2

Events
Singles	men	women
Doubles	men	women
- Aegon International

Andreas Seppi was the defending champion, but lost in the final to Andy Roddick, 6–3, 6–2.

== Seeds ==
1. (France) Richard Gasquet (second round)
2. (Spain) Marcel Granollers (second round)
3. (Italy) Andreas Seppi (final)
4. (Australia) Bernard Tomic (second round)
5. (France) Julien Benneteau (first round)
6. (United States) Andy Roddick (champion)
7. (Germany) Philipp Kohlschreiber (quarterfinals, retired)
8. (Spain) Pablo Andújar (first round)

== Draw ==
Key

- Q = Qualifier
- WC = Wild card
- LL = Lucky loser
- Alt = Alternate
- ITF = ITF entry
- PR = Protected ranking
- SR = Special ranking
- SE = Special exempt
- JE = Junior exempt
- JR = Junior Accelerator Programme entrant
- CO = College Accelerator Programme entrant
- NG = Next Gen Accelerator Program entrant
- w/o = Walkover
- r = Retired
- d = Defaulted

=== Finals ===
Semifinals
(Belgium) Steve Darcis	3	1^{r}
6/WC	(United States) Andy Roddick	6	3
3	(Italy) Andreas Seppi	7	6
(United States) Ryan Harrison	5	1

Final
6/WC	(United States) Andy Roddick	6	6
3	(Italy) Andreas Seppi	3	2

=== Top half ===
First round
WC	(United Kingdom) J Ward	6	1	4
Q	(Australia) M Matosevic	4	6	6
(Belgium) S Darcis	6	6
Q	(Australia) M Ebden	2	4
(Cyprus) M Baghdatis	6	6
8	(Spain) P Andújar	1	1
(Italy) F Fognini	7^{7}	6^{3}	6
(Spain) A Ramos	6^{2}	7^{7}	2
Q	(France) P-H Mathieu	5	7^{7}	6^{4}
(France) J Chardy	7	6^{5}	7^{7}
SE	(United States) S Querrey	2^{r}
6/WC	(United States) A Roddick	5

Second round
1	(France) R Gasquet	6	6^{5}	6^{3}
Q	(Australia) M Matosevic	1	7^{7}	7^{7}
(Belgium) S Darcis	6	4	6
(Cyprus) M Baghdatis	4	6	4
4	(Australia) B Tomic	6	3	5
(Italy) F Fognini	4	6	7
(France) J Chardy	2	6^{6}
6/WC	(United States) A Roddick	6	7^{8}

Quarterfinals
Q	(Australia) M Matosevic	2	6^{4}
(Belgium) S Darcis	6	7^{7}
(Italy) F Fognini	3	6	5
6/WC	(United States) A Roddick	6	3	7

Semifinals
(Belgium) S Darcis	3	1^{r}
6/WC	(United States) A Roddick	6	3

=== Bottom half ===
First round
7	(Germany) P Kohlschreiber	6	7
(Japan) G Soeda	4	5
(United States) D Young	1	4
WC	(United Kingdom) J Baker	6	6
(Argentina) C Berlocq	3	6	6
(Kazakhstan) M Kukushkin	6	4	2
5	(France) J Benneteau	3	6	6^{4}
(Chinese Taipei) Y-h Lu	6	2	7^{7}
(United States) R Harrison	3	7^{7}	7^{8}
Q	(Canada) V Pospisil	6	6^{2}	6^{6}
(France) M Llodra	4	3
(Uzbekistan) D Istomin	6	6

Second round
7	(Germany) P Kohlschreiber	6	3	6
WC	(United Kingdom) J Baker	2	6	3
(Argentina) C Berlocq	6^{2}	3
3	(Italy) A Seppi	7^{7}	6
(Chinese Taipei) Y-h Lu	1	6^{2}
(United States) R Harrison	6	7^{7}
(Uzbekistan) D Istomin	6	4	7^{7}
2	(Spain) M Granollers	1	6	6^{2}

Quarterfinals
7	(Germany) P Kohlschreiber	5	1^{r}
3	(Italy) A Seppi	7	2
(United States) R Harrison	7^{7}	6
(Uzbekistan) D Istomin	6^{5}	4

Semifinals
3	(Italy) A Seppi	7	6
(United States) R Harrison	5	1

== Qualifying ==
=== Seeds ===
1. (Australia) Matthew Ebden (qualified)
2. (Australia) Marinko Matosevic (qualified)
3. (Germany) Tobias Kamke (second round)
4. (Czech Republic) Lukáš Rosol (qualifying competition)
5. (Germany) Daniel Brands (first round)
6. (Canada) Vasek Pospisil (qualified)
7. (Germany) Matthias Bachinger (second round)
8. (Romania) Victor Hănescu (second round)

=== Qualifiers ===
1. (Australia) Matthew Ebden
2. (Australia) Marinko Matosevic
3. (France) Paul-Henri Mathieu
4. (Canada) Vasek Pospisil

=== Draw ===
==== First qualifier ====
First round
1	(Australia) Matthew Ebden	6	6
(Russia) Alexander Kudryavtsev	2	3
(Russia) Mikhail Elgin	6	6^{6}	6
(Argentina) Marco Trungelliti	4	7^{8}	3
(United Kingdom) Joshua Goodall	7^{7}	3	6
WC	(United Kingdom) Edward Corrie	6^{5}	6	3
(United Kingdom) Oliver Golding	0	6	7
5	(Germany) Daniel Brands	6	4	5

Second round
1	(Australia) Matthew Ebden	6	6
(Russia) Mikhail Elgin	3	2
(United Kingdom) Joshua Goodall	6	7^{7}
(United Kingdom) Oliver Golding	2	6^{4}

Qualifying competition
1	(Australia) Matthew Ebden	6	6^{7}	7^{7}
(United Kingdom) Joshua Goodall	3	7^{9}	6^{4}

==== Second qualifier ====
First round
2	(Australia) Marinko Matosevic	7^{7}	0	7
(Australia) Greg Jones	6^{5}	6	5
(Switzerland) Stéphane Bohli	2	4
(Ukraine) Illya Marchenko	6	6
(United Kingdom) Daniel Smethurst	3	4
(United States) Robert Kendrick	6	6
(Serbia) Ilija Bozoljac	3	1
7	(Germany) Matthias Bachinger	6	6

Second round
2	(Australia) Marinko Matosevic	3	7^{7}	6
(Ukraine) Illya Marchenko	6	6^{5}	4
(United States) Robert Kendrick	6	7
7	(Germany) Matthias Bachinger	2	5

Qualifying competition
2	(Australia) Marinko Matosevic	6	6
(United States) Robert Kendrick	3	2

==== Third qualifier ====
First round
3	(Germany) Tobias Kamke	6	6
WC	(United Kingdom) Lewis Burton	2	2
(Denmark) Frederik Nielsen	2	7^{7}	4
(France) Paul-Henri Mathieu	6	6^{3}	6
(Australia) John Millman	2	7^{7}	6
(Uzbekistan) Farrukh Dustov	6	6^{5}	3
(United Kingdom) Richard Bloomfield	4	5
8	(Romania) Victor Hănescu	6	7

Second round
3	(Germany) Tobias Kamke	1	4
(France) Paul-Henri Mathieu	6	6
(Australia) John Millman	6	6^{2}	6
8	(Romania) Victor Hănescu	4	7^{7}	0

Qualifying competition
(France) Paul-Henri Mathieu	6	6
(Australia) John Millman	3	2

==== Fourth qualifier ====
First round
4	(Czech Republic) Lukáš Rosol	6	6
(Russia) Evgeny Kirillov	2	2
WC	(United Kingdom) Jonny O'Mara	5	4
(Russia) Denis Matsukevitch	7	6
(Argentina) Nicolás Pastor	3	2
(Poland) Michał Przysiężny	6	6
WC	(United Kingdom) Joshua Ward-Hibbert	1	4
6	(Canada) Vasek Pospisil	6	6

Second round
4	(Czech Republic) Lukáš Rosol	6	6
(Russia) Denis Matsukevitch	4	4
(Poland) Michał Przysiężny	2	2
6	(Canada) Vasek Pospisil	6	6

Qualifying competition
4	(Czech Republic) Lukáš Rosol	4	6^{3}
6	(Canada) Vasek Pospisil	6	7^{7}
