= 2012 Aegon International – Women's singles =

Women's singles
- 2012 Aegon International

Final
- Champion: (Austria) Tamira Paszek
- Runner-up: (Germany) Angelique Kerber
- Score: 5–7, 6–3, 7–5

Events
| Singles | men | women |
| Doubles | men | women |
| ← 2011 · | Aegon International | · 2013 → |

Marion Bartoli was the defending champion, but lost in the semifinal to Tamira Paszek.

Paszek went on to win the title, defeating Angelique Kerber in the final 5–7, 6–3, 7–5. Paszek saved five championship points in the final against Kerber before winning the title.

== Seeds ==
1. (Poland) Agnieszka Radwańska (first round)
2. (Czech Republic) Petra Kvitová (first round)
3. (Denmark) Caroline Wozniacki (first round)
4. (France) Marion Bartoli (semifinals)
5. (Germany) Angelique Kerber (final)
6. (Serbia) Ana Ivanovic (withdrew because of a right hip injury)
7. (Czech Republic) Lucie Šafářová (quarterfinals)
8. (Slovakia) Daniela Hantuchová (second round)
9. (Czech Republic) Petra Cetkovská (second round)

== Draw ==
=== Key ===
- Q = Qualifier
- WC = Wild card
- LL = Lucky loser
- Alt = Alternate
- ITF = ITF entry
- PR = Protected ranking
- SR = Special ranking
- SE = Special exempt
- JE = Junior exempt
- JR = Junior Accelerator Programme entrant
- CO = College Accelerator Programme entrant
- NG = Next Gen Accelerator Program entrant
- w/o = Walkover
- r = Retired
- d = Defaulted

=== Finals ===
Semifinals
(Austria) Tamira Paszek | 4 | 7 | 6
4 | (France) Marion Bartoli | 6 | 5 | 4
(Czech Republic) Klára Zakopalová | 0 | 3
5 | (Germany) Angelique Kerber | 6 | 6

Final
(Austria) Tamira Paszek | 5 | 6 | 7
5 | (Germany) Angelique Kerber | 7 | 3 | 5

=== Top half ===
First round
1 | (Poland) A Radwańska | 2 | 4
(Bulgaria) T Pironkova | 6 | 6
Q | (Canada) S Dubois | 6 | 6
(Spain) C Suárez Navarro | 4 | 4
(Austria) T Paszek | 7 | 6
(New Zealand) M Erakovic | 5 | 1
WC | (United Kingdom) A Keothavong | 2 | 3
8 | (Slovakia) D Hantuchová | 6 | 6
4 | (France) M Bartoli | 6 | 6
(Romania) S Cîrstea | 2 | 2
(Canada) A Wozniak | 6 | 4 | 7^{7}
(Kazakhstan) G Voskoboeva | 3 | 6 | 6^{5}
Q | (Hungary) G Arn | 3 | 4
WC | (United Kingdom) H Watson | 6 | 6
(Hungary) T Babos | 6 | 3 | 6^{6}
7 | (Czech Republic) L Šafářová | 3 | 6 | 7^{8}

Second round
(Bulgaria) T Pironkova | 6 | 4 | 6
Q | (Canada) S Dubois | 0 | 6 | 4
(Austria) T Paszek | 6 | 3 | 6
8 | (Slovakia) D Hantuchová | 4 | 6 | 1
4 | (France) M Bartoli | 6 | 6
(Canada) A Wozniak | 2 | 2
WC | (United Kingdom) H Watson | 6^{5} | 1
7 | (Czech Republic) L Šafářová | 7^{7} | 6

Quarterfinals
(Bulgaria) T Pironkova | 0 | 4
(Austria) T Paszek | 6 | 6
4 | (France) M Bartoli | 6 | 6
7 | (Czech Republic) L Šafářová | 4 | 2

Semifinals
(Austria) T Paszek | 4 | 7 | 6
4 | (France) M Bartoli | 6 | 5 | 4

=== Bottom half ===
First round
9 | (Czech Republic) P Cetkovská | 3 | 6 | 6
LL | (Czech Republic) A Hlaváčková | 6 | 2 | 1
(China) J Zheng | 3 | 6 | 3
(Czech Republic) K Zakopalová | 6 | 4 | 6
(Chinese Taipei) S-w Hsieh | 2 | 0^{r}
(Russia) A Pavlyuchenkova | 6 | 3
(United States) C McHale | 6 | 6^{7} | 6
3 | (Denmark) C Wozniacki | 1 | 7^{9} | 4
5 | (Germany) A Kerber | 3 | 6 | 7
Q | (Russia) E Vesnina | 6 | 0 | 5
(Germany) M Barthel | 1 | 6 | 1
(South Africa) C Scheepers | 6 | 4 | 6
Q | (United Kingdom) L Robson | 3 | 6 | 6
(Spain) MJ Martínez Sánchez | 6 | 2 | 2
(Russia) E Makarova | 7 | 6
2 | (Czech Republic) P Kvitová | 5 | 4

Second round
9 | (Czech Republic) P Cetkovská | 1 | 6 | 2
(Czech Republic) K Zakopalová | 6 | 1 | 6
(Russia) A Pavlyuchenkova | 7 | 3 | 6
(United States) C McHale | 5 | 6 | 4
5 | (Germany) A Kerber | 6 | 6
(South Africa) C Scheepers | 3 | 2
Q | (United Kingdom) L Robson | 4 | 5
(Russia) E Makarova | 6 | 7

Quarterfinals
(Czech Republic) K Zakopalová | 6 | 7
(Russia) A Pavlyuchenkova | 3 | 5
5 | (Germany) A Kerber | 6 | 6
(Russia) E Makarova | 2 | 4

Semifinals
(Czech Republic) K Zakopalová | 0 | 3
5 | (Germany) A Kerber | 6 | 6

== Qualifying ==
=== Seeds ===
1. (United States) Varvara Lepchenko (second round)
2. (Georgia (country)) Anna Tatishvili (second round)
3. (France) Stéphanie Foretz Gacon (second round)
4. (Russia) Elena Vesnina (qualified)
5. (United States) Irina Falconi (withdrew, still playing in Birmingham)
6. (United Kingdom) Elena Baltacha (second round, withdrew)
7. (Czech Republic) Andrea Hlaváčková (qualifying competition, lucky loser)
8. (Russia) Vera Dushevina (first round)

=== Qualifiers ===
1. (United Kingdom) Laura Robson
2. (Canada) Stéphanie Dubois
3. (Hungary) Gréta Arn
4. (Russia) Elena Vesnina

=== Lucky loser ===
1. (Czech Republic) Andrea Hlaváčková

=== Draw ===
==== First qualifier ====
First round
(Serbia) Bojana Jovanovski | 6 | 6
(Italy) Alberta Brianti | 1 | 4
(United Kingdom) Laura Robson | 6 | 6
WC | (United Kingdom) Daneika Borthwick | 2 | 2
(Chinese Taipei) Chang Kai-chen | 5 | 2
6/WC | (United Kingdom) Elena Baltacha | 7 | 6

Second round
1 | (United States) Varvara Lepchenko | 6^{3} | 3
(Serbia) Bojana Jovanovski | 7^{7} | 6
(United Kingdom) Laura Robson | w/o
6/WC | (United Kingdom) Elena Baltacha

Qualifying competition
(Serbia) Bojana Jovanovski | 2 | 3
(United Kingdom) Laura Robson | 6 | 6

==== Second qualifier ====
First round
(Romania) Edina Gallovits-Hall | 4 | 2
(Canada) Stéphanie Dubois | 6 | 6
WC | (United Kingdom) Lisa Whybourn | 1 | 2
(India) Sania Mirza | 6 | 6
(United Kingdom) Emily Webley-Smith | 7^{7} | 3 | 2
7 | (Czech Republic) Andrea Hlaváčková | 6^{3} | 6 | 6

Second round
2 | (Georgia (country)) Anna Tatishvili | 6 | 5 | 1
(Canada) Stéphanie Dubois | 4 | 7 | 6
(India) Sania Mirza | 3 | 3
7 | (Czech Republic) Andrea Hlaváčková | 6 | 6

Qualifying competition
(Canada) Stéphanie Dubois | 7^{9} | 7
7 | (Czech Republic) Andrea Hlaváčková | 6^{7} | 5

==== Third qualifier ====
First round
3 | (France) Stéphanie Foretz Gacon | 6 | 6
(Poland) Klaudia Jans-Ignacik | 3 | 2
WC | (South Africa) Natalie Grandin
WC | (United Kingdom) Jade Windley | w/o
(Argentina) Paula Ormaechea | 6^{5} | 7^{7} | 7^{7}
(Poland) Alicja Rosolska | 7^{7} | 6^{4} | 6^{3}
(Hungary) Gréta Arn | 7 | 6
8 | (Russia) Vera Dushevina | 5 | 3

Second round
3 | (France) Stéphanie Foretz Gacon | 6 | 6^{2} | 1
WC | (United Kingdom) Jade Windley | 4 | 7^{7} | 6
(Argentina) Paula Ormaechea | 3 | 6^{4}
(Hungary) Gréta Arn | 6 | 7^{7}

Qualifying competition
WC | (United Kingdom) Jade Windley | 2 | 0
(Hungary) Gréta Arn | 6 | 6

==== Fourth qualifier ====
First round
4 | (Russia) Elena Vesnina | 6 | 3 | 6
(Thailand) Tamarine Tanasugarn | 3 | 6 | 2
(United Kingdom) Johanna Konta | 3 | 6 | 7^{7}
(United Kingdom) Naomi Broady | 6 | 1 | 6^{4}

Second round
4 | (Russia) Elena Vesnina | 6 | 6
(United Kingdom) Johanna Konta | 3 | 2
(Colombia) Mariana Duque-Mariño | 2 | 2
(Croatia) Mirjana Lučić | 6 | 6

Qualifying competition
4 | (Russia) Elena Vesnina | w/o
(Croatia) Mirjana Lučić
