= 2012 Aegon International – Men's doubles =

Men's doubles
- 2012 Aegon International

Final
- Champion: (United Kingdom) Colin Fleming (United Kingdom) Ross Hutchins
- Runner-up: (United Kingdom) Jamie Delgado (United Kingdom) Ken Skupski
- Score: 6–4, 6–3

Events
Singles	men	women
Doubles	men	women
← 2011 ·	Aegon International	· 2013 →

Jonathan Erlich and Andy Ram were the defending champions but they lost in the Quarterfinals to the eventual Champions Colin Fleming and Ross Hutchins who defeated Jamie Delgado and Ken Skupski in an all British final, 6–4, 6–3.

== Seeds ==
1. (Poland) Mariusz Fyrstenberg / (Poland) Marcin Matkowski (first round)
2. (Spain) Marcel Granollers / (Spain) Marc López (first round)
3. (United Kingdom) Colin Fleming / (United Kingdom) Ross Hutchins (champions)
4. (Philippines) Treat Conrad Huey / (Austria) Oliver Marach (first round)

== Draw ==
=== Key ===
- Q = Qualifier
- WC = Wild card
- LL = Lucky loser
- Alt = Alternate
- SE = Special exempt
- PR = Protected ranking
- ITF = ITF entry
- JE = Junior exempt
- w/o = Walkover
- r = Retired
- d = Defaulted
- SR = Special ranking

=== Draw ===
First round
1	(Poland) M Fyrstenberg (Poland) M Matkowski	2	4
WC	(United Kingdom) J Delgado (United Kingdom) K Skupski	6	6
(Belgium) S Darcis (Kazakhstan) M Kukushkin	5	6	[6]
(Spain) P Andújar (Spain) A Ramos	7	1	[10]
4	(Philippines) TC Huey (Austria) O Marach	3	6^{4}
(Russia) M Elgin (Uzbekistan) D Istomin	6	7^{7}
(United States) E Butorac (United Kingdom) J Murray	6^{10}	2
(Italy) D Bracciali (Italy) A Seppi	7^{12}	6
(Israel) J Erlich (Israel) A Ram	6	6
(Argentina) C Berlocq (Chinese Taipei) Y-h Lu	3	4
(Australia) P Hanley (Austria) J Knowle	3	4
3	(United Kingdom) C Fleming (United Kingdom) R Hutchins	6	6
(Australia) M Ebden (United States) D Young	4	6	[12]
(Italy) F Fognini (Germany) F Moser	6	3	[10]
WC	(United Kingdom) D Inglot (United Kingdom) J Marray	6	6
2	(Spain) M Granollers (Spain) M López	3	3

Quarterfinals
WC	(United Kingdom) J Delgado (United Kingdom) K Skupski	6	6
(Spain) P Andújar (Spain) A Ramos	3	0
(Russia) M Elgin (Uzbekistan) D Istomin	5	7^{7}	[12]
(Italy) D Bracciali (Italy) A Seppi	7	6^{1}	[10]
(Israel) J Erlich (Israel) A Ram	6^{2}	6^{2}
3	(United Kingdom) C Fleming (United Kingdom) R Hutchins	7^{7}	7^{7}
(Australia) M Ebden (United States) D Young	6	4	[11]
WC	(United Kingdom) D Inglot (United Kingdom) J Marray	2	6	[9]

Semifinals
WC	(United Kingdom) J Delgado (United Kingdom) K Skupski	6	6
(Russia) M Elgin (Uzbekistan) D Istomin	3	4
3	(United Kingdom) C Fleming (United Kingdom) R Hutchins	6^{3}	6	[10]
(Australia) M Ebden (United States) D Young	7^{7}	4	[8]

Final
WC	(United Kingdom) J Delgado (United Kingdom) K Skupski	4	3
3	(United Kingdom) C Fleming (United Kingdom) R Hutchins	6	6
