= 2013 Aegon International – Men's singles =

Men's singles
- 2013 Aegon International

Final
- Champion: (Spain) Feliciano López
- Runner-up: (France) Gilles Simon
- Score: 7–6^{(7–2)}, 6–7^{(5–7)}, 6–0

Events
Singles	men	women
Doubles	men	women
- Aegon International

Andy Roddick was the defending champion, but he retired from professional tennis in September 2012.

Feliciano López won the title defeating Gilles Simon, 7–6^{(7–2)}, 6–7^{(5–7)}, 6–0 in the final. It was his third career title and first since 2010.

== Seeds ==
The top four seeds receive a bye into the second round.

1. (Canada) Milos Raonic (second round)
2. (France) Gilles Simon (final)
3. (Germany) Philipp Kohlschreiber (second round)
4. (Argentina) Juan Mónaco (second round)
5. (South Africa) Kevin Anderson (first round)
6. (Ukraine) Alexandr Dolgopolov (first round)
7. (Italy) Andreas Seppi (semifinals)
8. (Italy) Fabio Fognini (quarterfinals)

== Draw ==
Key

- Q = Qualifier
- WC = Wild card
- LL = Lucky loser
- Alt = Alternate
- ITF = ITF entry
- PR = Protected ranking
- SR = Special ranking
- SE = Special exempt
- JE = Junior exempt
- JR = Junior Accelerator Programme entrant
- CO = College Accelerator Programme entrant
- NG = Next Gen Accelerator Program entrant
- w/o = Walkover
- r = Retired
- d = Defaulted

=== Finals ===
Semifinals
(Croatia) Ivan Dodig	6^{3}	1
(Spain) Feliciano López	7^{7}	6
7	(Italy) Andreas Seppi	4	3
2	(France) Gilles Simon	6	6

Final
(Spain) Feliciano López	7^{7}	6^{5}	6
2	(France) Gilles Simon	6^{2}	7^{7}	0

=== Top half ===
First round
(Uzbekistan) D Istomin	3	4
(Croatia) I Dodig	6	6
(Serbia) V Troicki	3	2
(Slovakia) M Kližan	6	6
(Slovenia) G Žemlja	7^{8}	2	4
8	(Italy) F Fognini	6^{6}	6	6
(Finland) J Nieminen	6^{3}	6^{5}
(Spain) F López	7^{7}	7^{7}
(Spain) A Ramos	6	6
Q	(United States) J Blake	2	4
(Spain) F Verdasco	1	6	6
6	(Ukraine) A Dolgopolov	6	3	2

Second round
1/WC	(Canada) M Raonic	2	6^{7}
(Croatia) I Dodig	6	7^{9}
(Slovakia) M Kližan	7^{8}	2	2
8	(Italy) F Fognini	6^{6}	6	6
4	(Argentina) J Mónaco	4	4
(Spain) F López	6	6
(Spain) A Ramos	4	0
(Spain) F Verdasco	6	6

Quarterfinals
(Croatia) I Dodig	6	6
8	(Italy) F Fognini	3	2
(Spain) F López	6	7^{8}
(Spain) F Verdasco	4	6^{6}

Semifinals
(Croatia) I Dodig	6^{3}	1
(Spain) F López	7^{7}	6

=== Bottom half ===
First round
7	(Italy) A Seppi	3	6	6
Q	(France) G Rufin	6	3	4
Q	(United States) R Harrison	6	2	7^{7}
(France) P-H Mathieu	4	6	6^{4}
(Czech Republic) R Štěpánek	6	6
(Australia) M Matosevic	3	2
5	(South Africa) K Anderson	6^{4}	2
(France) J Benneteau	7^{7}	6
(Australia) B Tomic	6	6
WC	(United Kingdom) J Ward	3	4
WC	(United Kingdom) K Edmund	6	6
Q	(France) K de Schepper	4	4

Second round
7	(Italy) A Seppi	3	7	6
Q	(United States) R Harrison	6	5	3
(Czech Republic) R Štěpánek	7	6
3	(Germany) P Kohlschreiber	5	3
(France) J Benneteau	2	7	6^{4}
(Australia) B Tomic	6	5	7^{7}
WC	(United Kingdom) K Edmund	6^{5}	6^{3}
2	(France) G Simon	7^{7}	7^{7}

Quarterfinals
7	(Italy) A Seppi	6	6
(Czech Republic) R Štěpánek	4	2
(Australia) B Tomic	6^{8}	3
2	(France) G Simon	7^{10}	6

Semifinals
7	(Italy) A Seppi	4	3
2	(France) G Simon	6	6

== Qualifying ==
=== Seeds ===
1. (Argentina) Guido Pella (first round)
2. (Russia) Alex Bogomolov Jr. (second round)
3. (United States) Ryan Harrison (qualified)
4. (France) Kenny de Schepper (qualified)
5. (France) Guillaume Rufin (qualified)
6. (United States) James Blake (qualified)
7. (United States) Michael Russell (qualifying competition)
8. (Argentina) Martín Alund (qualifying competition)

=== Qualifiers ===
1. (United States) James Blake
2. (France) Guillaume Rufin
3. (United States) Ryan Harrison
4. (France) Kenny de Schepper

=== Draw ===
==== First qualifier ====
First round
1	(Argentina) Guido Pella	5	6	6^{1}
(United Kingdom) Luke Bambridge	7	4	7^{7}
(Ukraine) Serhiy Stakhovsky	6	6^{2}	6
(France) Fabrice Martin	4	7^{7}	4
WC	(United Kingdom) Adam Thornton-Brown	1	4
WC	(United Kingdom) Evan Hoyt	6	6
(United Kingdom) Joshua Milton	3	4
6	(United States) James Blake	6	6

Second round
(United Kingdom) Luke Bambridge	6	5	3
(Ukraine) Serhiy Stakhovsky	3	7	6
WC	(United Kingdom) Evan Hoyt	1	2
6	(United States) James Blake	6	6

Qualifying competition
(Ukraine) Serhiy Stakhovsky	7	4	4
6	(United States) James Blake	5	6	6

==== Second qualifier ====
First round
2	(Russia) Alex Bogomolov Jr.	5	7^{7}	6
(United Kingdom) Neil Pauffley	7	6^{5}	4
(Uzbekistan) Farrukh Dustov	6	6
(United Kingdom) Miles Bugby	3	4
(United Kingdom) Daniel Cox	6	6
(United Kingdom) Cameron Norrie	0	2
(Germany) Frank Moser	3	4
5	(France) Guillaume Rufin	6	6

Second round
2	(Russia) Alex Bogomolov Jr.	5	2
(Uzbekistan) Farrukh Dustov	7	6
(United Kingdom) Daniel Cox	6^{4}	3
5	(France) Guillaume Rufin	7^{7}	6

Qualifying competition
(Uzbekistan) Farrukh Dustov	5	1
5	(France) Guillaume Rufin	7	6

==== Third qualifier ====
First round
3	(United States) Ryan Harrison	6	6
(United Kingdom) Alexander Slabinsky	3	4
(Japan) Tatsuma Ito	6	6
(South Africa) Ruan Roelofse	4	4
(New Zealand) Marcus Daniell	2	7^{10}	3
(Serbia) Ilija Bozoljac	6	6^{8}	0^{r}
(United Kingdom) Richard Gabb	6	2	1
7	(United States) Michael Russell	2	6	6

Second round
3	(United States) Ryan Harrison	7^{7}	6
(Japan) Tatsuma Ito	6^{0}	2
(New Zealand) Marcus Daniell	6^{5}	6	5
7	(United States) Michael Russell	7^{7}	2	7

Qualifying competition
3	(United States) Ryan Harrison	7^{7}	6
7	(United States) Michael Russell	6^{5}	4

==== Fourth qualifier ====
First round
4	(France) Kenny de Schepper	6	6
WC	(United Kingdom) Stefan Sterland-Markovic	1	4
(Denmark) Frederik Nielsen	6	6
(United Kingdom) Daniel Smethurst	0	1
(United Kingdom) Liam Broady	6	6
(United Kingdom) Sean Thornley	1	4
WC	(United Kingdom) Jarryd Bant	0	0
8	(Argentina) Martín Alund	6	6

Second round
4	(France) Kenny de Schepper	6	6
(Denmark) Frederik Nielsen	4	4
(United Kingdom) Liam Broady	4	2
8	(Argentina) Martín Alund	6	6

Qualifying competition
4	(France) Kenny de Schepper	6	6
8	(Argentina) Martín Alund	1	1
