= Tamira Paszek =

Austrian tennis player (born 1990)

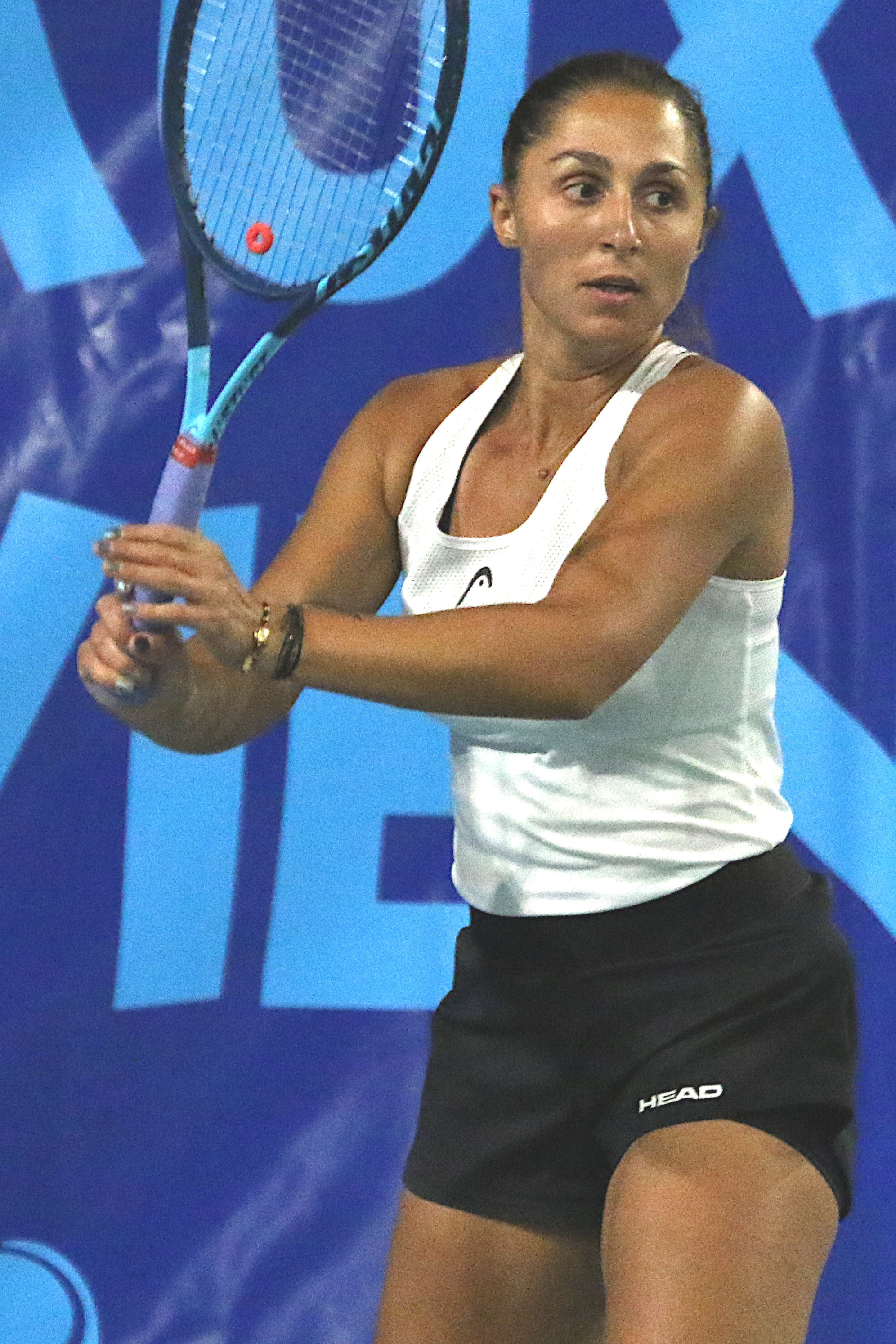
- Paszek at the 2021 ITF Poitiers
- Full name: Tamira Shelah Paszek
- Country (sports): Austria
- Born: 6 December 1990 (age 35) Dornbirn, Austria
- Height: 1.65 m (5 ft 5 in)
- Turned pro: 26 October 2005
- Plays: Right-handed (two-handed backhand)
- Prize money: US$ 2,541,617

Singles
- Career record: 421–312
- Career titles: 3
- Highest ranking: No. 26 (11 February 2013)

Grand Slam singles results
- Australian Open: 2R (2007, 2013)
- French Open: 2R (2007, 2014)
- Wimbledon: QF (2011, 2012)
- US Open: 4R (2007)

Other tournaments
- Olympic Games: 1R (2012)

Doubles
- Career record: 80–104
- Career titles: 0 WTA, 4 ITF
- Highest ranking: No. 93 (6 May 2013)

Grand Slam doubles results
- Australian Open: 2R (2012)
- French Open: 1R (2007, 2008, 2009, 2011, 2012, 2013)
- Wimbledon: 2R (2012, 2013)
- US Open: 3R (2012)

Team competitions
- Fed Cup: 14–21
- Last updated on: 4 September 2026.

Tamira Shelah Paszek (born 6 December 1990) is an inactive Austrian tennis player.

On 11 February 2013, she reached her career-high singles ranking of world No. 26. On 6 May 2013, she peaked at No. 93 in the doubles rankings. Paszek has won three singles titles on the WTA Tour, as well as six singles and four doubles titles on the ITF Women's Circuit.

== Early life ==
Paszek was introduced to tennis by her mother, Françoise Paszek, at age four-and-a-half. Her mother is a Chilean-born Austrian of Polish and French descent; and her father, Ariff Mohamed, a Tanzanian-born, Kenyan-raised Canadian of Indian descent. Tamira has a Polish surname from her maternal grandfather.

== Career ==
Paszek best results are reaching the quarterfinals of a Grand Slam tournament twice, 2011 and 2012 at the Wimbledon Championships. In her career, Paszek has defeated top-ten players Marion Bartoli, Elena Dementieva, Daniela Hantuchová, Ana Ivanovic, Jelena Janković, Angelique Kerber, Flavia Pennetta, Francesca Schiavone, Patty Schnyder, and Caroline Wozniacki.

=== 2005–07 ===
As a junior, Paszek was a girls' singles finalist at the 2005 Wimbledon Championships and the 2006 US Open.

In September 2005, she won her first title at an ITF tournament in Sofia. In October of the same year she received a wildcard to appear at her first WTA tournament in Linz; she defeated Elena Vesnina in the first round and lost to Ana Ivanovic after a tough first set.

In 2006, she passed qualifying in Istanbul, where she lost in the second round to Catalina Castaño; and in Portorož at the Slovenia Open, where she won her first WTA Tour title by defeating No. 6 seed Maria Elena Camerin, in straight sets. That was her career-first singles title in only her third main draw. It made her the youngest singles titlist in 2006 and the seventh-youngest of all time, the youngest winner being Tracy Austin. A month later, at the Zurich Open, she lost to Camerin in the second round of qualifying. She finished 2006 as world No. 181 in the WTA rankings.

Paszek started at the Australian Open, where she qualified for the main draw and defeated top-40 player Séverine Brémond in straight sets in the first round, before losing to No. 22 seed Vera Zvonareva.

After her loss to Li Na in the second round of the Miami Open, Paszek broke into the top 100. At the French Open, she was defeated by Justine Henin in the second round.

At Paszek's first grass tournament of her career, she reached the third round in Birmingham, losing to Maria Sharapova in a tight match. At Wimbledon, she reached the fourth round after beating two seeded players, No. 17 seed Tatiana Golovin and No. 12 seed Elena Dementieva; she then eventually lost to No. 5 seed Svetlana Kuznetsova, in straight sets. The win pushed her up 19 places to No. 35, a career high and only a few spots from a guaranteed seeding at the US Open.

Paszek also played for Austria Fed Cup team, and won her first two matches in the group stage against Australia but lost both her matches in the World Group play-offs against Israel: a singles match against Shahar Pe'er and a doubles match, partnering Melanie Klaffner.

Tamira debuted on the US Open, reaching the fourth round, beating the No. 24 and No. 11 seeds, Francesca Schiavone and Patty Schnyder, on the way. She lost to the sixth seed, Anna Chakvetadze.

Paszek decided against defending her title at the Slovenia Open, in favour of the China Open tournament in Beijing. However, she lost in the second round to fourth-seeded Elena Dementieva (whom she beat in Wimbledon) in less than an hour.

=== 2008–09 ===
At the Auckland Open, Paszek made it to the semifinals, losing to veteran Lindsay Davenport. In the first round of the Australian Open, Paszek played third-seeded Jelena Janković. In the deciding set, Paszek led by two games and had three match points before Janković came back to win the three-hour match.

Following this she lost in the first round of Doha to Patty Schnyder. Then she competed for the first time as a seed in a Tier I tournament at Indian Wells retiring in the third round to Casey Dellacqua. Then in Miami she was defeated by Anna Chakvetadze in the second round.

This started a losing streak of six straight matches running through the French Open and Wimbledon. At Wimbledon she lost her second marathon match of the year to Francesca Schiavone. It came to an end in Los Angeles where she defeated Aiko Nakamura only to lose to Flavia Pennetta in the second round.

On 31 July, Paszek beat world No. 1, Ana Ivanovic, in the third round of the Rogers Cup in Montreal in three sets. In the quarterfinals, she played Victoria Azarenka, to whom she lost. In the first round of Cincinnati, she lost to Petra Cetkovská. At the US Open, Paszek defeated the 23rd seed Maria Kirilenko, only then to lose to the lower ranked opponent Magdaléna Rybáriková. Paszek was runner-up in Bali. She reached the final, after taking out the seventh seed Flavia Pennetta and the top seed Daniela Hantuchová where she lost against Patty Schnyder. She then withdrew from the Linz Open due to injury.

Paszek ended her professional relationship with coach Lari Passos and started with Angel Giminez.

In the first round of the Australian Open, Paszek lost to wildcard Jelena Dokić in three sets. She passed the first round at Indian Wells, winning in straight sets against Mara Santangelo, and lost in the second round against 21st seed Alisa Kleybanova.

=== 2010 ===
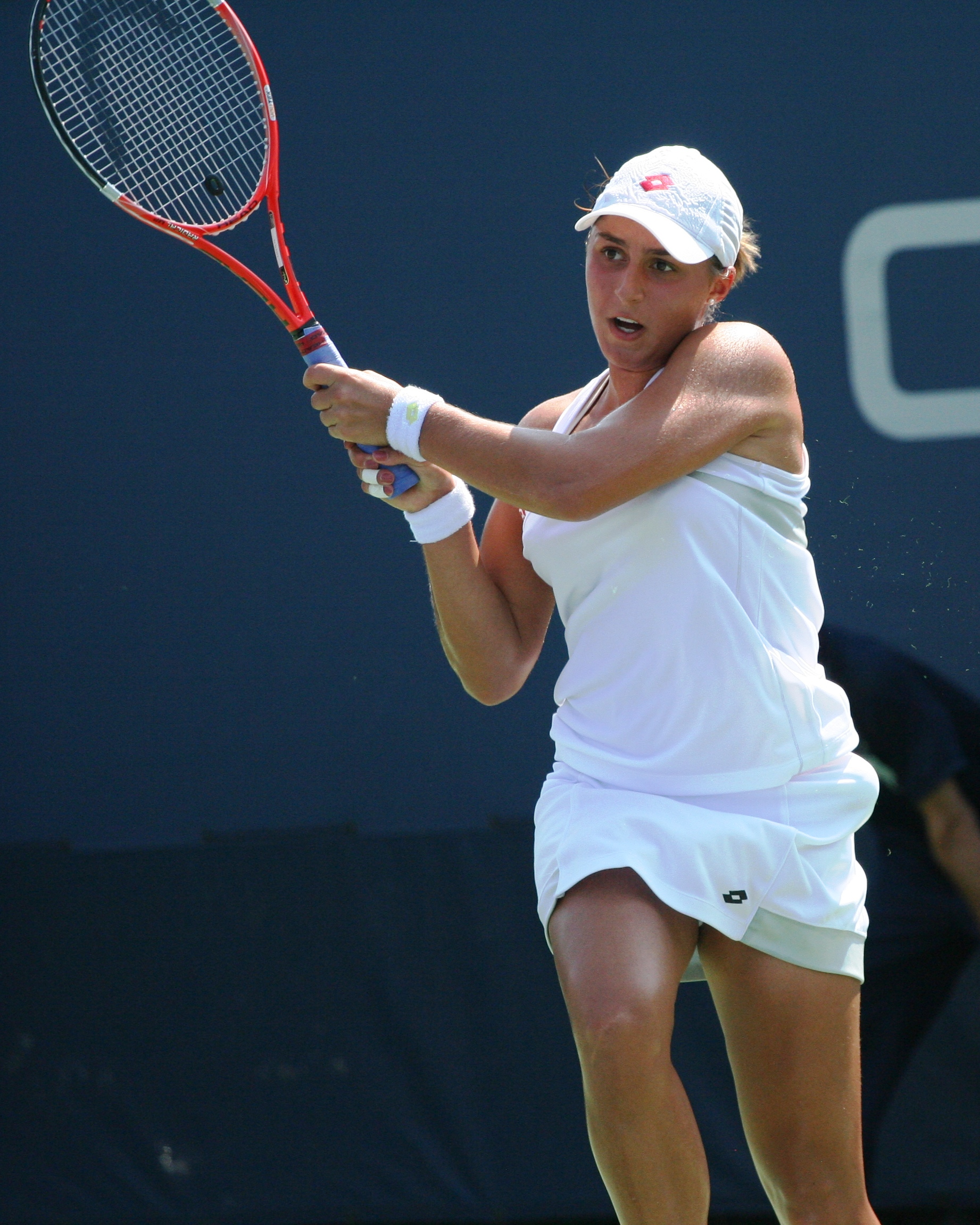
Paszek at the 2010 US Open

Paszek began 2010 season at the Auckland Open where she retired during her second round of qualifying match against Rebecca Marino. Her next tournament was the Hobart International. She beat qualifier Roberta Vinci in the first round. In the second round, she lost to eighth seed Gisela Dulko. At the Australian Open, Paszek was defeated in the first round by Julia Görges.

At the WTA indoor event in Paris, Paszek lost in the first round to eventual finalist Lucie Šafářová. To reach the main draw at the Dubai Championships, Paszek entered qualifying. She was defeated in the second round of qualifying by Anna-Lena Grönefeld. In March, Paszek competed at the Indian Wells Open. She lost in the first round to Julie Coin. Playing at the Miami Open, she was defeated in the second round by 22nd seed Anastasia Pavlyuchenkova.

Paszek lost in early rounds of Marbella, Barcelona and Fes, and didn't enter the French Open. Instead, she played a $25k tournament in İzmir and won it, beating Çağla Büyükakçay. Her next event was ITF Budapest. She qualified, defeating Vanda Lukács and Jana Čepelová, and reached the second round, losing to Lenka Wienerová.

She then entered the Wimbledon Championships and qualified, but lost to Kurumi Nara in the second round.

She tried to qualify in Budapest defeating Eleni Daniilidou and Jessica Moore but lost to Andreja Klepač. Her next tournament was the Prague Open where she entered qualifying. Paszek defeated Tadeja Majerič and then crushed top seed Anastasia Rodionova but then lost to Liana Ungur. After losing the first set 2–6, Paszek went on to play better, but then retired because of the heat and a stomach complaint. However, because Gisela Dulko withdrew, Paszek gained a chance to enter the main draw. She faced Frenchwoman Alizé Cornet and lost in a match that lasted three hours and 40 minutes.

At the Slovenia Open, she defeated Jelena Kostanić Tošić for her first main-draw win since Ponte Vedra Beach in 2009. She then faced Stefanie Vögele and lost.

After some bad losses in qualifying of the Premier tournaments, Paszek found her form in the US Open where she entered qualifying. She defeated Michaëlla Krajicek, Kim So-jing and Evgeniya Rodina to reach the main draw. In the final qualifying round, Paszek trailed Rodina 2–6 after the first set, before coming back to win the second and blank the Russian in the third. In the first round of the main draw, she defeated 26th seed Lucie Šafářová, despite being three games behind in the second set. She lost to Chan Yung-jan in the second round.

Her next tournament was the Tournoi de Québec where she defeated Marina Erakovic in the first and Jill Craybas in the second round. In her first quarterfinal of 2010, she defeated No. 8 seed Sofia Arvidsson. She then crushed Christina McHale in the semifinal to book her place in the final, where she won the title by beating Bethanie Mattek-Sands.

=== 2011: Wimbledon quarterfinal ===
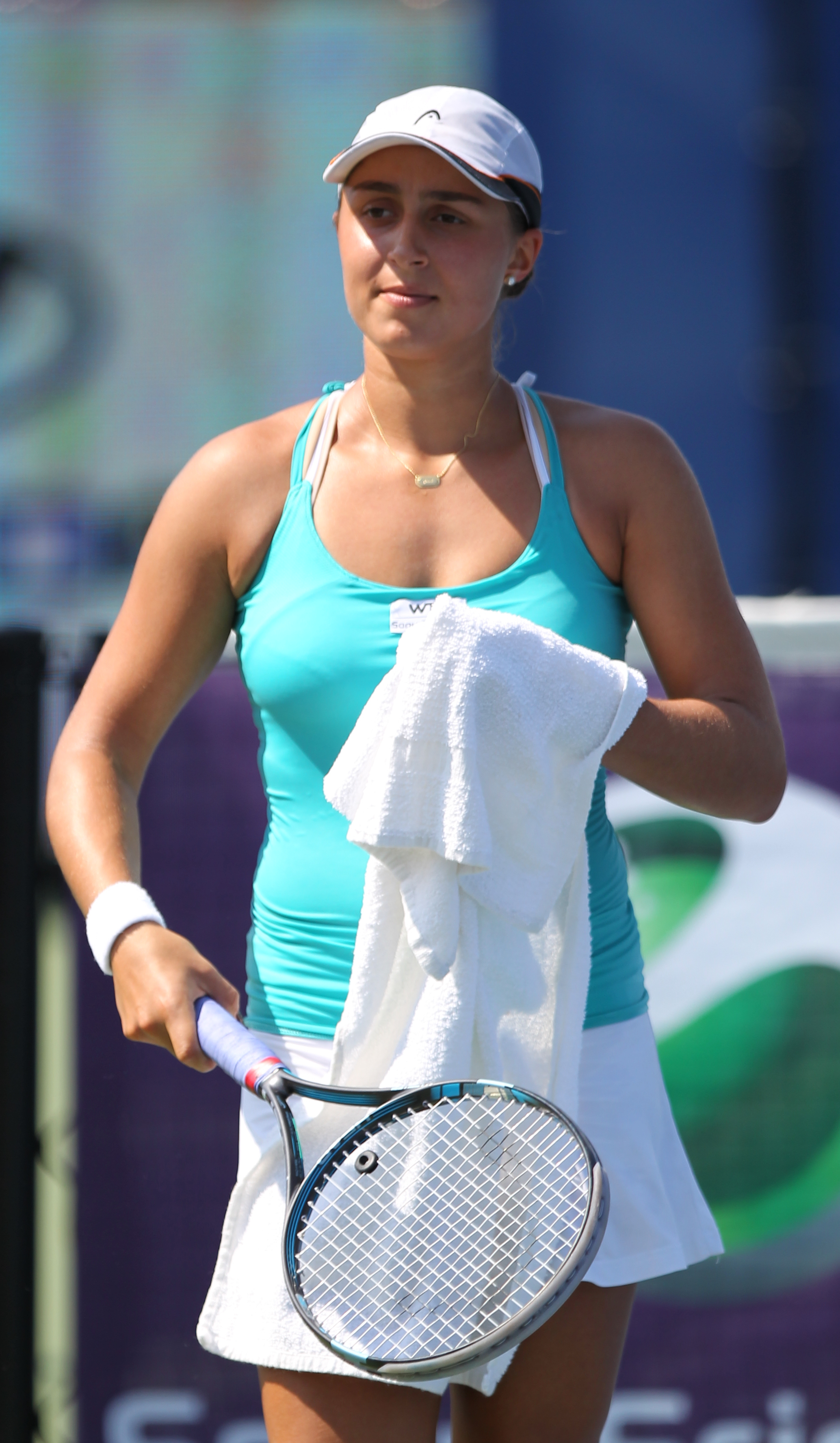
Paszek at the 2011 Washington Open

Paszek began the 2011 season at the Auckland Open where she lost in the first round to eighth seed Sofia Arvidsson. At the Hobart International, Paszek qualified for the main draw defeating Darya Kustova, Stéphanie Dubois, and sixth seed Kateryna Bondarenko. In the first round, she beat Australian wildcard Olivia Rogowska. She was defeated in the second round by sixth seed and eventual champion Jarmila Groth. Ranked ninety at the Australian Open, Paszek lost in the first round to Vania King.

In February, Paszek played at the Pattaya Open in Thailand, and was defeated in the first round by top seed and two-time defending champion Vera Zvonareva. Paszek lost in the final round of qualifying at the Dubai Championships to Nuria Llagostera Vives. Paszek qualified for the Indian Wells Open beating Madison Brengle and Andrea Hlaváčková. She lost her first-round match to Anabel Medina Garrigues. She also lost in the first round of qualifying at the Miami Open to Nuria Llagostera Vives.

Paszek began her clay-court season at the Charleston Open. She defeated Melanie Oudin in the first round. She lost in the second round to third seed Jelena Janković. Paszek qualified for the Porsche Tennis Grand Prix beating Sesil Karatantcheva, Lenka Juríková, and Zuzana Kučová. She was defeated in the first round by German Andrea Petkovic. In Portugal at the Estoril Open, Paszek qualified for the tournament defeating Ekaterina Ivanova, Laura Siegemund, and Heather Watson. She retired during her first-round match versus Anastasiya Yakimova. Paszek played at the Italian Open where she qualified for the tournament beating Casey Dellacqua and Virginie Razzano. However, she was defeated in the first round by Elena Vesnina. Ranked 85 at the French Open, Paszek lost in the first round to 29th seed Peng Shuai.

Paszek began her grass-court season at the Nottingham Trophy. Seeded third, she advanced to the quarterfinals where she lost to eventual champion Eleni Daniilidou. In the Birmingham Classic, Paszek reached the third round after wins over Sania Mirza and sixth seed Ekaterina Makarova. She lost her third-round match to eventual champion Sabine Lisicki. Getting through qualifying at Eastbourne, Paszek lost in the first round to second seed Li Na. Ranked 80 at the Wimbledon Championships, she reached the quarterfinals for the first time in her career after victories over Ayumi Morita, Christina McHale, sixth seed Francesca Schiavone, and Ksenia Pervak. She lost her quarterfinal match to fourth seed Victoria Azarenka.

Paszek began the US Open Series at the first edition of the Washington Open. Seeded third, she made it to the semifinals defeating Melanie Oudin, qualifier Madison Brengle, and Stéphanie Dubois. She lost in her semifinal match to top seed Shahar Pe'er. At the Carlsbad Open, Paszek retired during her third-round match against Sloane Stephens due to a left abdominal injury. Ranked 37 at the US Open, Paszek lost in the first round to Akgul Amanmuradova.

Seeded third and the defending champion at the Challenge Bell, Paszek was defeated in the semifinals by Marina Erakovic. Competing in Tokyo at the Pan Pacific Open, Paszek lost in the first round to Christina McHale. In Beijing at the China Open, Paszek upset tenth seed Jelena Janković in their first-round match. She then had a three-set victory over Petra Cetkovská in the second round. She was defeated in the third round by Maria Kirilenko. At Linz, she lost in the first round to qualifier Sorana Cîrstea. Paszek played her final tournament of the year at the Luxembourg Open. She was defeated in the second round by sixth seed Julia Görges.

Paszek ended the year ranked 43.

=== 2012: Third title, second Wimbledon quarterfinal ===
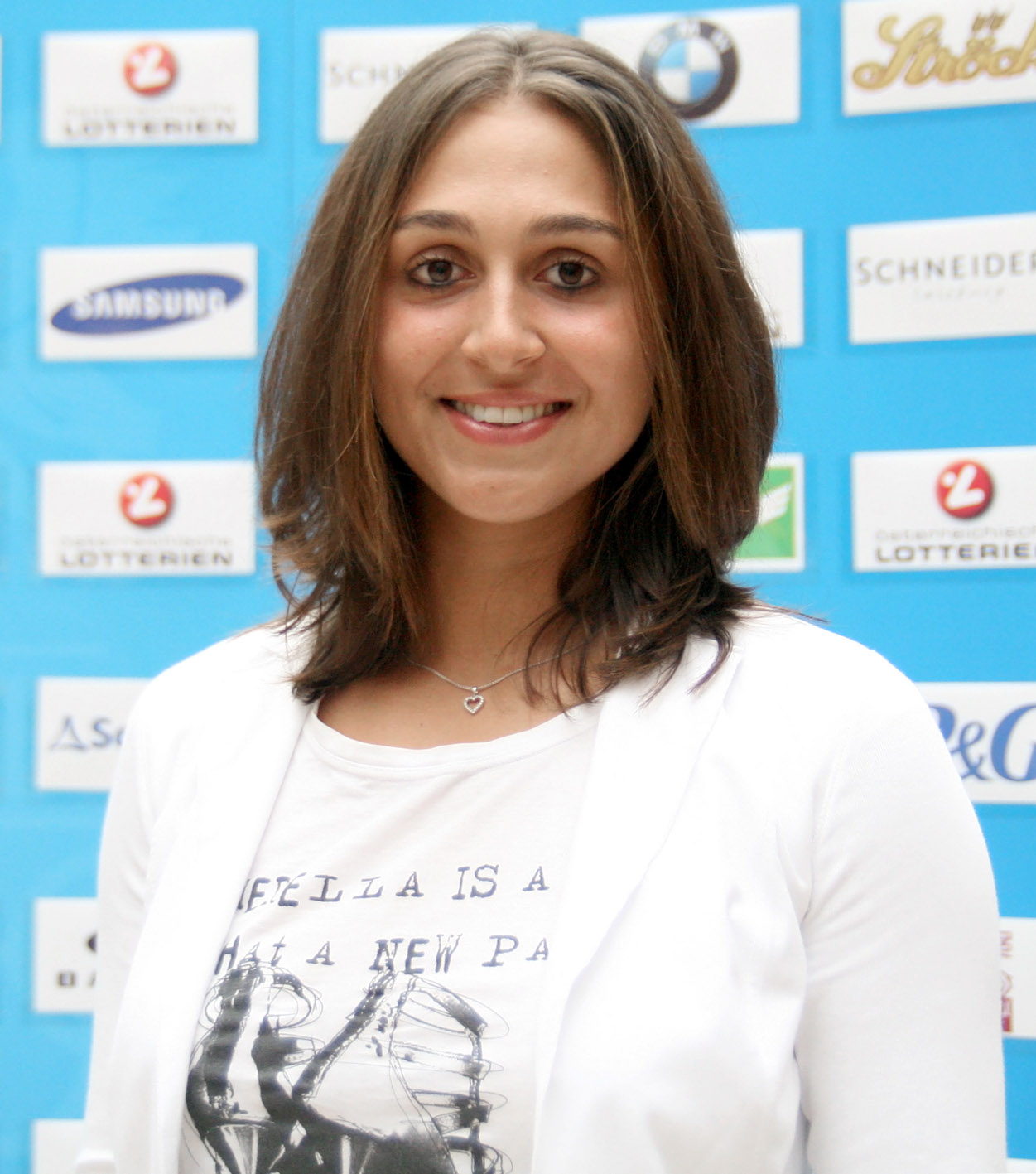
Paszek part of the 2012 Austrian Olympic team

Paszek began the year at the Brisbane International where she lost in the first round to Ana Ivanovic. At Sydney, she was defeated in the first round of qualifying by Bojana Jovanovski. Ranked 45 at the Australian Open, Paszek lost in the first round to 12th seed Serena Williams.

At the Qatar Open, Paszek lost in the first round to qualifier Anne Keothavong. She was defeated in the first round of qualifying at the Dubai Tennis Championships by Anastasia Rodionova. Competing at Indian Wells, she recorded her first win of the season by defeating Anastasiya Yakimova in the first round. In the second round, Paszek faced 23rd seed Lucie Šafářová and retired trailing 6–3, 3–1 due to a right wrist injury. In Miami, she was up against Anna Tatishvili in the first round. Paszek was forced to retire trailing 6–4, 4–3 due to a back injury.

Paszek began clay-court season at the Estoril Open. In the first round, she lost to ninth seed Polona Hercog. At the Madrid Open, she was defeated in the first round by Spanish wildcard Sílvia Soler Espinosa. Seeded eighth at the Internationaux de Strasbourg, she had her second win of the season by defeating Alberta Brianti in the first round. She lost in the second round to Johanna Larsson. Ranked 52 at the French Open, she was defeated in the first round by 28th seed Peng Shuai.

Paszek began her grass-court season at the Nottingham Trophy. As the top seed, she was defeated in the first round by Alison Riske. Seeded 12th at the Birmingham Classic, Paszek lost in the first round to Anne Keothavong. Paszek's final grass-court warm-up tournament before Wimbledon was the Eastbourne International. She advanced to her first WTA Tour final since 2010 after wins over Marina Erakovic, eighth seed Daniela Hantuchová, Tsvetana Pironkova, and fourth seed and defending champion Marion Bartoli. In the final, Paszek upset fifth seed Angelique Kerber to win her third WTA title. Paszek was 3–5 down in the final set and saved five championship points. Ranked 37 at the Wimbledon Championships, she upset former world No. 1 and seventh seed, Caroline Wozniacki, in the first round. This match lasted 3 hours and 12 minutes. In the second round, she beat Alizé Cornet. Then, she defeated Yanina Wickmayer in the third round and 21st seed Roberta Vinci in the fourth round to reach the quarterfinals for the second year in a row. Paszek lost in her quarterfinal match for the second successive year to second seed Victoria Azarenka.

Representing Austria in the 2012 Summer Olympics, Paszek was defeated in the first round by Alizé Cornet.

Paszek began her US Open Series at the Rogers Cup. In the first round, she defeated Julia Görges. In the second round, she faced top seed Victoria Azarenka. Azarenka retired at 3–3 in the first set due to a left knee injury. In the third round, she beat Carla Suárez Navarro. In the quarterfinals, Paszek lost to fifth seed and eventual champion, Petra Kvitová. At the Cincinnati Open, Paszek was up against Sofia Arvidsson who won the first set 6–1. In the second set, Arvidsson was leading 2–1 before Paszek retired because of a migraine. Her last tournament before the US Open was the New Haven Open where she lost in the first round to Sloane Stephens. Seeded 29th at the US Open, Paszek was defeated in the first round by Olga Govortsova.

In the Korea Open, she reached the quarterfinals after wins over Carla Suárez Navarro and Korean wildcard Lee So-ra. She lost in her quarterfinal match to sixth seed Varvara Lepchenko. In Tokyo at the Pan Pacific Open, she defeated qualifier Camila Giorgi in the first round. In the second round, Paszek was defeated easily by top seed Victoria Azarenka. Playing at the China Open, Paszek got revenge on Olga Govortsova and beat her in the first round. She lost in the second round to qualifier Elena Vesnina. Seeded seventh at the Linz Open, she was defeated in the first round by qualifier Bethanie Mattek-Sands. Her final tournament of the year was the Luxembourg Open. Seeded seventh, she lost in the first round to Lucie Hradecká.

Paszek ended the year ranked 30. This is her best season to date.

=== 2013: Career-high singles ranking, downfall, injuries ===
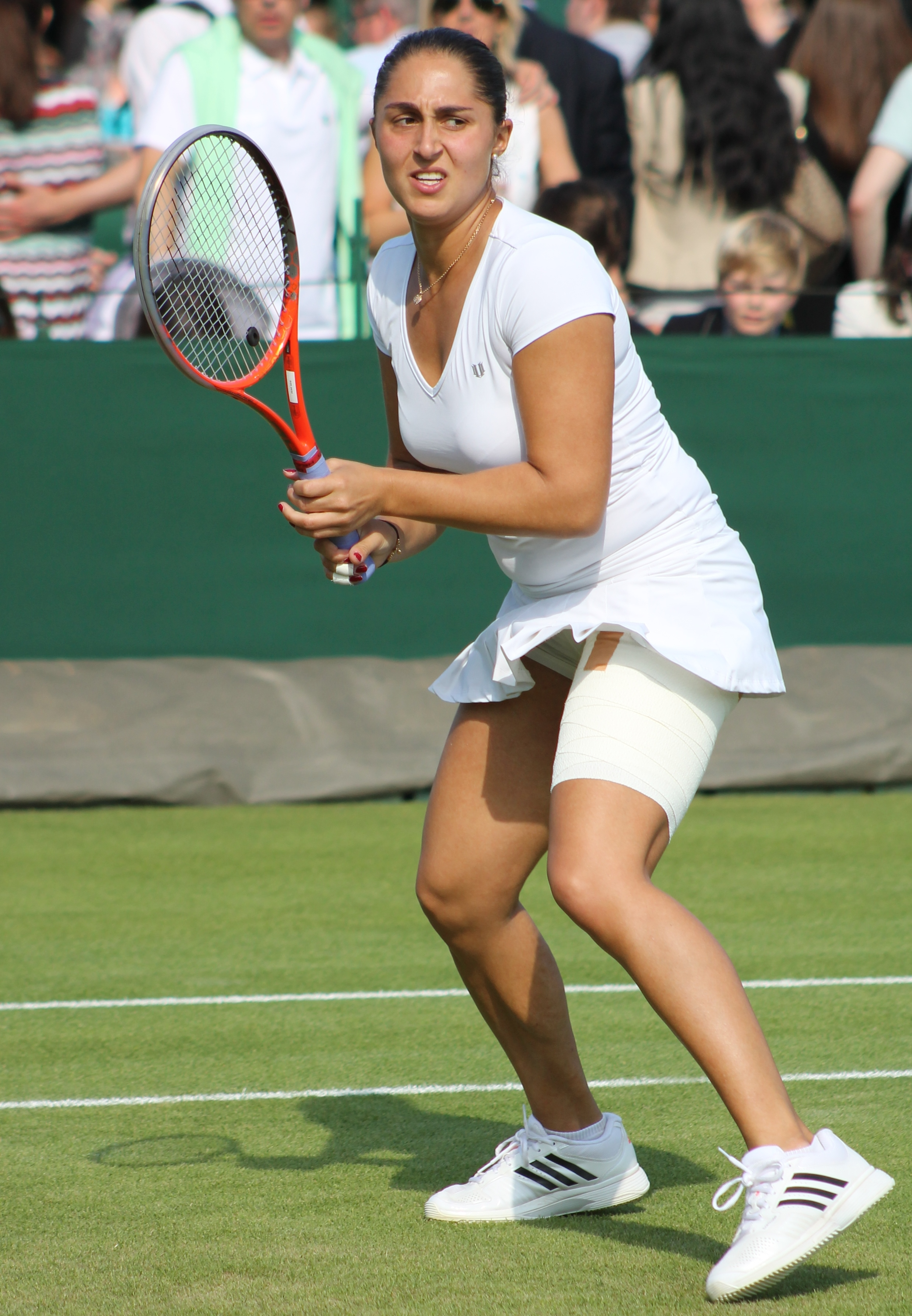
Paszek at the 2013 Wimbledon Championships

Paszek began her 2013 season at the Brisbane International. She lost in the first round to Urszula Radwańska. In Sydney, she was defeated in the first round by Jelena Janković. Seeded 30th ate Melbourne, she achieved her first Australian Open victory since 2007 with an emphatic three-set victory over Stefanie Vögele in the first round. However, in the second round, she was outplayed by American wildcard Madison Keys.

After the Australian Open, Paszek played at the Open GdF Suez in Paris. She was eliminated in the first round by lucky loser and eventual semifinalist, Kiki Bertens. At the Qatar Open, she had another first-round exit, losing to 13th seed Ana Ivanovic. In March, she traveled to California to compete at the Indian Wells Masters. As the 23rd seed, she got a first-round bye. She was beaten in the second round by American qualifier Mallory Burdette. The following week, she played in Miami. As the 26th seed, she again got a first-round bye. However, she couldn't pass the second round because she suffered a three-set loss at the hands of Simona Halep.

Paszek's clay-court season began at the Charleston Open. Seeded 13th, she retired in the first round after losing the first set 3–6 to American qualifier Grace Min due to a left neck injury. Paszek returned from injury at the Portugal Open. She lost in the first round to Monica Niculescu. Seeded second at the Internationaux de Strasbourg, she was defeated in the first round by French wildcard Virginie Razzano. Seeded 28th at the French Open, she lost in the first round to Melanie Oudin.

Paszek elected to contest at the Nottingham Trophy where she was the top seed. She opened her grass-court season with a hard-fought win over wildcard Anne Keothavong in the first round. However, she would progress no further as she was forced to retire against Alison Riske in their second-round encounter due to a hamstring injury. At Birmingham, Paszek was seeded fourth and was given a first-round bye. She drew Riske again in the second round and lost. Paszek entered the Eastbourne International as the defending champion, but again went out at the first hurdle, losing to fifth seed Caroline Wozniacki; she had to retire in the second set due to a thigh injury. Her final grass-court event was Wimbledon where she was the 28th seed. She was defeated in the first round by Alexandra Cadanțu. As a result, Paszek dropped out of the top 100.

She started her US Open Series at the Stanford Classic. There, she recorded her third win of the season when her opponent, qualifier Alla Kudryavtseva, retired during their first-round match due to heat illness. She lost in the second round to sixth seed Varvara Lepchenko. Her next tournament was the Cincinnati Open. Paszek suffered a double bagel thrashing in the first round at the hands of Daniela Hantuchová. In Toronto at the Rogers Cup, she lost a marathon match in the first round of qualifying to Anastasia Rodionova. For the last Grand Slam tournament of the year, the US Open, Paszek was defeated in the second round of qualifying by Andrea Hlaváčková.

She entered the Challenge Bell in Quebec City where she lost in the first round to Christina McHale. She then played two ITF events in the United States. At the first tournament, the ITF Albuquerque, Paszek got a three-set victory over Olivia Rogowska in the first round. She was then defeated in the second by eventual finalist Anna Tatishvili. At the Las Vegas Open, Paszek defeated Adriana Pérez in the first round. In the second, she lost to sixth seed, eventual finalist, and doubles partner CoCo Vandeweghe. However, she did capture the doubles title with Vandeweghe marking her first tournament win in either singles or doubles in 2013. Her most impressive result of the year came in France at the Open de Limoges, a $50k tournament. Unseeded, Paszek advanced to the final with wins over Johanna Konta, Andreea Mitu, Nina Zander, and Sílvia Soler Espinosa. However, her run came to an end as she lost in the final to Kristýna Plíšková. Despite the loss, she climbed back inside the top-200 and recorded her first set of consecutive wins since the Korea Open. Competing at the ITF Poitier as a wildcard, Paszek beat Johanna Konta in the first round. In the second round, she was defeated by fifth seed Alexandra Cadanțu. Playing in England the GB Pro-Series, Paszek won a tough three-set match over Andreea Mitu in the first round. She was then defeated in the second round by seventh seed and eventual finalist, Kristýna Plíšková. Her final tournament of the year was at the Al Habtoor Challenge in Dubai. After beating Storm Sanders, she lost in the second round to second seed and compatriot Patricia Mayr-Achleitner.

Paszek ended 2013 ranked 181.

=== 2014–16 ===
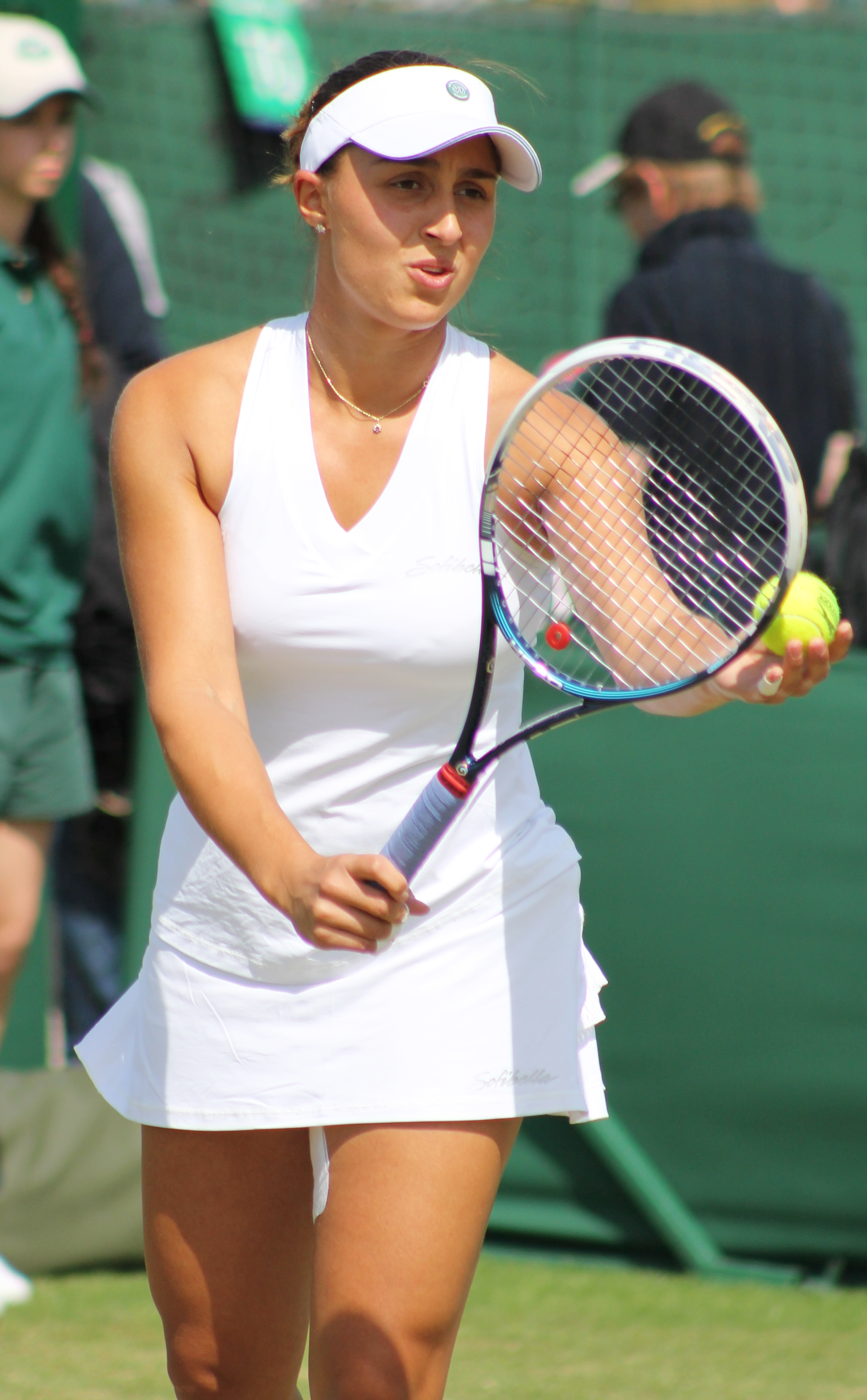
Paszek at the 2014 Wimbledon Championships

Paszek began her season at the Auckland Open. Playing as a wildcard, she lost in the first round to fifth seed Jamie Hampton. In the qualifying at the Australian Open, Paszek won her first round qualifying match over Australian wildcard and Bernard Tomic's sister Sara Tomic. She was defeated in the second round of qualifying by Duan Yingying. Having failed to defend the previous year's second round points, her ranking dropped outside the top 200.

Paszek elected to contest the $25k event in Rancho Santa Fe. She won the tournament defeating Shuko Aoyama in the final. The following week, she played another $25k event, this time in Surprise, Arizona. She advanced to the final where she lost the final in a three-set thriller to fourth seed Jovana Jakšić. Paszek wasn't able to convert on 14 opportunities to win the match. In Florida at the Innisbrook Open, Paszek was defeated in the first round by Mathilde Johansson.

Beginning her preparation for the French Open at the Charleston Open, Paszek lost in the first round of qualifying to Jarmila Gajdošová. In Poland at the Katowice Open, Paszek retired during her second round of qualifying match to Aleksandra Krunić. At the Wiesbaden Tennis Open, Paszek reached the final where she was defeated by Ekaterina Alexandrova. At the 2014 Open de Cagnes-sur-Mer, Paszek lost in her quarterfinal match to fifth seed and eventual champion Sharon Fichman. Paszek qualified for the main draw at the French Open without dropping a set in all three qualifying matches. In the main draw, she was defeated in the second round by ninth seed Dominika Cibulková.

Paszek started grass-court season at the Nottingham Trophy. She retired during her first-round match against British wildcard Naomi Broady. Getting through the qualifying rounds at the Birmingham Classic, Paszek lost in the first round to Lauren Davis. In the Eastbourne International, she was defeated in the final round of qualifying by Hsieh Su-wei. Entering the Wimbledon Championships after coming through qualifying, Paszek lost in the first round to 24th seed Kirsten Flipkens.

At the Lorraine Open in Contrexéville, she was defeated in the first round by fourth seed Johanna Larsson. Playing at the first edition of the Bucharest Open, Paszek retired during her second round of qualifying match against Vanda Lukács. Kicking off the US Open Series at the Washington Open, she lost in the first round of qualifying to Emily Webley-Smith. In Montreal at the Rogers Cup, she was defeated in the final round of qualifying to Heather Watson. At the Cincinnati Open, Paszek lost in the first round of qualifying to Monica Puig. Playing at the US Open, Paszek was defeated in the second round of qualifying by Irena Pavlovic. Competing at the first edition of the Hong Kong Open, she lost in the second round of qualifying to Zhang Kailin.

In Austria at the 2014 Linz Open, Paszek was defeated in the first round of qualifying by Kiki Bertens. She played her final tournament of the season at the Open de Touraine in Joué-lès-Tours, France. Seeded third, she retired during her first-round match against Urszula Radwańska.

Paszek ended the season ranked 133.

=== 2017–20 ===
Paszek returned to the ITF Circuit in August 2020, after having competed in only seven tournaments since the beginning of 2017.

== Grand Slam performance timelines ==
Key
W	F	SF	QF	#R	RR	Q#	DNQ	A	NH

(W) winner; (F) finalist; (SF) semifinalist; (QF) quarterfinalist; (#R) rounds 4, 3, 2, 1; (RR) round-robin stage; (Q#) qualification round; (DNQ) did not qualify; (A) absent; (NH) not held; (SR) strike rate (events won / competed); (W–L) win–loss record.

=== Singles ===
Tournament	2007	2008	2009	2010	2011	2012	2013	2014	2015	2016	W–L
Australian Open	2R	1R	1R	1R	1R	1R	2R	Q2	A	1R	2–8
French Open	2R	1R	1R	A	1R	1R	1R	2R	Q3	Q1	2–7
Wimbledon	4R	1R	1R	Q2	QF	QF	1R	1R	1R	1R	11–9
US Open	4R	2R	A	2R	1R	1R	Q2	Q2	Q3	Q1	5–5
Win–loss	8–4	1–4	0–3	1–2	4–4	4–4	1–3	1–2	0–1	0–2	20–29

=== Doubles ===
Tournament	2007	2008	2009	2010	2011	2012	2013	...	2016	W–L
Australian Open	A	1R	1R	1R	1R	2R	1R		A	1–6
French Open	1R	1R	1R	A	1R	1R	1R		A	0–6
Wimbledon	1R	1R	1R	A	1R	2R	2R		Q1	2–6
US Open	1R	2R	A	A	1R	3R	A		A	3–4
Win–loss	0–3	1–4	0–3	0–1	0–4	4–4	1–3		0–0	6–22

== WTA Tour finals ==
=== Singles: 4 (3 titles, 1 runner–up) ===
Legend WTA 1000 WTA 500 (1–0) WTA 250 (2–1)	Finals by surface Hard (1–1) Grass (1–0) Carpet (1–0)

Result	W–L	Date	Tournament	Tier	Surface	Opponent	Score
Win	1–0	Sep 2006	Slovenia Open, Slovenia	Tier IV (Note: The WTA Tier III tournaments, WTA Tier IV tournaments and WTA Tier V tournaments were reclassified as WTA International tournaments in 2009 and later as WTA 250 tournaments in 2021.)	Hard	(Italy) Maria Elena Camerin	7–5, 6–1
Loss	1–1	Sep 2008	Bali Tennis Classic, Indonesia	Tier III	Hard	(Switzerland) Patty Schnyder	3–6, 0–6
Win	2–1	Sep 2010	Tournoi de Québec, Canada	International	Carpet (i)	(United States) Bethanie Mattek-Sands	7–6^{(8–6)}, 2–6, 7–5
Win	3–1	Jun 2012	Eastbourne International, United Kingdom	Premier (Note: The WTA Tier II tournaments were reclassified as WTA Premier tournaments in 2009 and later as WTA 500 tournaments in 2021.)	Grass	(Germany) Angelique Kerber	5–7, 6–3, 7–5

== ITF Circuit finals ==
=== Singles: 9 (6 titles, 3 runner-ups) ===
Legend W50 tournaments (0–1) W25/35 tournaments (5–2) W15 tournaments (1–0)	Finals by surface Hard (4–2) Clay (1–1) Carpet (1–0)

Result	W–L	Date	Tournament	Tier	Surface	Opponent	Score
Win	1–0	Sep 2005	ITF Sofia, Bulgaria	W25	Clay	(Germany) Kristina Barrois	7–6^{(5)}, 6–3
Win	2–0	May 2010	ITF İzmir, Turkey	W25	Hard	(Turkey) Çağla Büyükakçay	6–2, 6–3
Loss	2–1	Oct 2013	Open de Limoges, France	W50	Hard (i)	(Czech Republic) Kristýna Plíšková	6–3, 3–6, 2–6
Win	3–1	Feb 2014	Rancho Santa Fe Open, US	W25	Hard	(Japan) Shuko Aoyama	6–1, 6–1
Loss	3–2	Feb 2014	ITF Surprise, United States	W25	Hard	(Serbia) Jovana Jović	6–4, 6–7^{(13)}, 5–7
Loss	3–3	May 2014	Wiesbaden Open, Germany	W25	Clay	(Russia) Ekaterina Alexandrova	6–7^{(4)}, 6–4, 3–6
Win	4–3	Oct 2021	ITF Monastir, Tunisia	W15	Hard	(Japan) Natsumi Kawaguchi	6–2, 6–3
Win	5–3	Jul 2023	ITF Don Benito, Spain	W25	Carpet	(Switzerland) Valentina Ryser	7–6^{(7)}, 6–7^{(5)}, 7–6^{(3)}
Win	6–3	Jan 2024	ITF Le Gosier, Guadeloupe	W35	Hard	(Belgium) Clara Vlasselaer	6–4, 7–5

=== Doubles: 9 (4 titles, 5 runner-ups) ===
Legend W75 tournaments (0–2) W50 tournaments (1–0) W25 tournaments (2–1) W15 tournaments (1–2)	Finals by surface Hard (3–4) Clay (1–1)

Result	W–L	Date	Tournament	Tier	Surface	Partner	Opponent	Score
Win	1–0	Sep 2005	ITF Sofia, Bulgaria	W25	Clay	(Croatia) Sanja Ančić	(Brazil) Joana Cortez (Poland) Karolina Kosińska	6–7^{(9)}, 6–2, 6–4
Win	2–0	May 2010	ITF İzmir, Turkey	W25	Hard	(Brazil) Maria Fernanda Alves	(Turkey) Çağla Büyükakçay (Turkey) Pemra Özgen	6–1, 6–2
Win	3–0	Sep 2013	Las Vegas Open, United States	W50	Hard	(United States) CoCo Vandeweghe	(United States) Denise Muresan (United States) Caitlin Whoriskey	6–4, 6–2
Loss	3–1	Nov 2013	GB Pro-Series Barnstaple, United Kingdom	W75	Hard (i)	(Romania) Raluca Olaru	(United Kingdom) Naomi Broady (Czech Republic) Kristýna Plíšková	3–6, 6–3, [5–10]
Loss	3–2	Sep 2015	Albuquerque Championships, US	W75	Hard	(United States) Anna Tatishvili	(Brazil) Paula Cristina Gonçalves (United States) Sanaz Marand	6–4, 2–6, [3–10]
Loss	3–3	Aug 2021	ITF Braunschweig, Germany	W25	Clay	(United States) Chiara Scholl	(Germany) Katharina Hobgarski (Ukraine) Valeriya Strakhova	6–3, 2–6, [10–12]
Win	4–3	Oct 2021	ITF Monastir, Tunisia	W15	Hard	(France) Yasmine Mansouri	(Germany) Laura Böhner (Serbia) Mihaela Đaković	6–1, 6–1
Loss	4–4	Oct 2021	ITF Monastir, Tunisia	W15	Hard	(Japan) Mana Ayukawa	(Japan) Natsuho Arakawa (Thailand) Luksika Kumkhum	4–6, 2–6
Loss	4–5	Mar 2024	ITF Monastir, Tunisia	W15	Hard	(Serbia) Elena Milovanović	(United Kingdom) Mingge Xu (Czech Republic) Radka Zelníčková	4–6, 2–6

== Head-to-head records ==
=== No. 1 wins ===
#	Player	Event	Surface	Round	Score	Outcome
1.	(Serbia) Ana Ivanovic	2008 Rogers Cup	Hard	3rd round	6–2, 1–6, 6–2	Quarterfinalist
2.	(Belarus) Victoria Azarenka	2012 Rogers Cup	Hard	2nd round	3–3 ret.	Quarterfinalist

=== Top-10 wins ===
#	Player	Rank	Event	Surface	Round	Score
2007
1.	(Russia) Elena Dementieva	No. 9	Wimbledon, UK	Grass	3R	3–6, 6–2, 6–3
2.	(Switzerland) Patty Schnyder	No. 10	US Open, United States	Hard	3R	4–6, 6–4, 7–6^{(7–1)}
2008
3.	(Serbia) Ana Ivanovic	No. 1	Canadian Open	Hard	3R	6–2, 1–6, 6–2
4.	(Italy) Flavia Pennetta	No. 10	Bali, Indonesia	Hard	QF	4–6, 6–0, 6–2
5.	(Slovakia) Daniela Hantuchová	No. 8	Bali, Indonesia	Hard	SF	6–2, 5–7, 6–4
2011
6.	(Italy) Francesca Schiavone	No. 7	Wimbledon, UK	Grass	3R	3–6, 6–4, 11–9
7.	(Serbia) Jelena Janković	No. 10	China Open	Hard	1R	7–5, 6–4
2012
8.	(France) Marion Bartoli	No. 9	Eastbourne, UK	Grass	SF	4–6, 7–5, 6–4
9.	(Germany) Angelique Kerber	No. 8	Eastbourne, UK	Grass	F	5–7, 6–3, 7–5
10.	(Denmark) Caroline Wozniacki	No. 7	Wimbledon, UK	Grass	1R	5–7, 7–6^{(7–4)}, 6–4
11.	(Belarus) Victoria Azarenka	No. 1	Canadian Open	Hard	2R	3–3 ret.

== Longest winning streaks ==
=== 9–match singles winning streak (2012) ===
#	Tournament	Category	Start date	Surface	Rd	Opponent	Rank	Score	TPR
–	Birmingham Classic, United Kingdom	WTA International	11 June 2012	Grass	1R	(United Kingdom) Anne Keothavong	No. 76	2–6, 5–7	No. 58
1	Eastbourne International, United Kingdom	WTA Premier	18 June 2012	Grass	1R	(New Zealand) Marina Erakovic	No. 45	7–5, 6–1	No. 59
2	Eastbourne International, United Kingdom	WTA Premier	18 June 2012	Grass	2R	(Slovakia) Daniela Hantuchová (8)	No. 29	6–4, 3–6, 6–1	No. 59
3	Eastbourne International, United Kingdom	WTA Premier	18 June 2012	Grass	QF	(Bulgaria) Tsvetana Pironkova	No. 40	6–0, 6–4	No. 59
4	Eastbourne International, United Kingdom	WTA Premier	18 June 2012	Grass	SF	(France) Marion Bartoli (4)	No. 9	4–6, 7–5, 6–4	No. 59
5	Eastbourne International, United Kingdom	WTA Premier	18 June 2012	Grass	F	(Germany) Angelique Kerber (5)	No. 8	5–7, 6–3, 7–5	No. 59
6	Wimbledon, United Kingdom	Grand Slam	25 June 2012	Grass	1R	(Denmark) Caroline Wozniacki (7)	No. 7	5–7, 7–6^{(7–4)}, 6–4	No. 37
7	Wimbledon, United Kingdom	Grand Slam	25 June 2012	Grass	2R	(France) Alizé Cornet	No. 60	6–2, 6–1	No. 37
8	Wimbledon, United Kingdom	Grand Slam	25 June 2012	Grass	3R	(Belgium) Yanina Wickmayer	No. 36	2–6, 7–6^{(7–4)}, 7–5	No. 37
9	Wimbledon, United Kingdom	Grand Slam	25 June 2012	Grass	4R	(Italy) Roberta Vinci (21)	No. 23	6–2, 6–2	No. 37
–	Wimbledon, United Kingdom	Grand Slam	25 June 2012	Grass	QF	(Belarus) Victoria Azarenka (2)	No. 2	3–6, 6–7^{(4–7)}	No. 37
