= Jamie Delgado =

British tennis player and coach (born 1977)

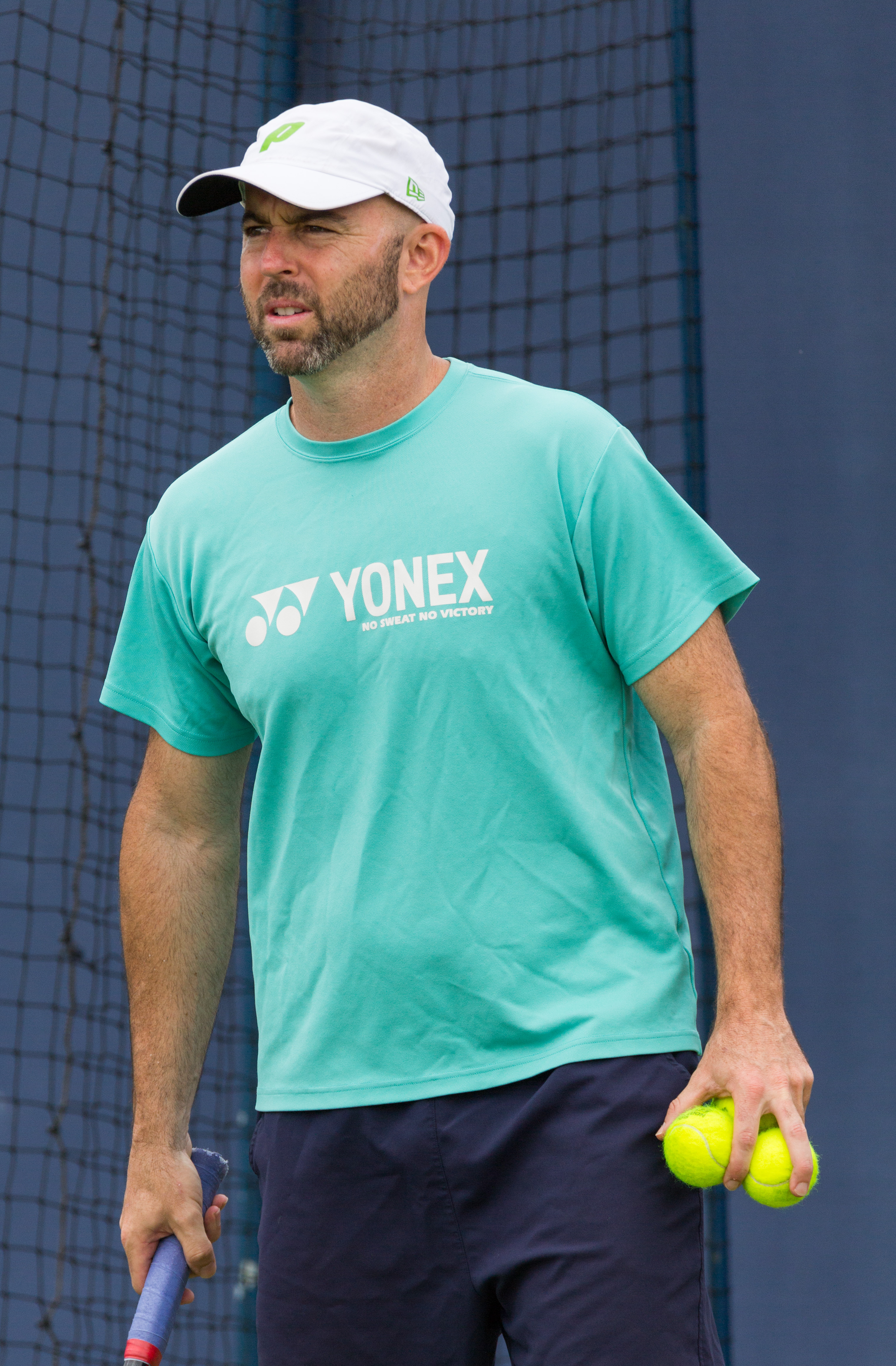
- Delgado coaching Gilles Müller during a practice session at the 2015 Aegon Championships in London
- Country (sports): Great Britain
- Residence: London, England
- Born: 21 March 1977 (age 49) Birmingham, England
- Height: 5 ft 10 in (1.78 m)
- Turned pro: 1995
- Retired: Sep 2014
- Plays: Right-handed (two-handed backhand)
- Prize money: $834,831

Singles
- Career record: 11–35 (ATP Tour and Grand Slam-level, and in Davis Cup)
- Career titles: 0
- Highest ranking: No. 121 (20 August 2001)

Grand Slam singles results
- Australian Open: 1R (2000)
- Wimbledon: 2R (1999, 2001, 2006)
- US Open: 1R (2000)

Doubles
- Career record: 31–79 (ATP Tour and Grand Slam-level, in and Davis Cup)
- Career titles: 0
- Highest ranking: No. 57 (8 October 2012)

Grand Slam doubles results
- Australian Open: 1R (2012, 2013)
- French Open: 1R (2010)
- Wimbledon: 3R (2006, 2009)
- US Open: 3R (2011, 2012)

Coaching career (2014–)
- Gilles Müller (2014–2016); Andy Murray (2016–2021); Denis Shapovalov (2021); Jack Draper (2025-2026); Grigor Dimitrov (2022-2025, Jun 2026-)
- Last updated on: 31 May 2026.

Jamie Delgado (born 21 March 1977) is a British tennis coach and former professional player. Delgado has represented Great Britain in the Davis Cup, most recently in 2006.

Delgado holds the all-time male record for playing in consecutive Wimbledon tournaments, playing for the 23rd time in 2014 at the age of 37. His best singles performance at Wimbledon was reaching the second round, on three occasions (1999, 2001 and 2006).

In total he has won three singles Challenger Tour titles but as the years passed, he became more predominantly a doubles specialist player where he has had better success winning fifteen challenger Tour titles and making the final of two ATP Tour events both in 2012.

== Coaching career ==
In September 2014, Delgado retired to concentrate on coaching Gilles Müller. Since Müller finished 2013 at No. 368 in the world rankings after missing the second half of the year with injury, he climbed back into the top 50. At the age of 32 Müller was in the best form of his career, for which he gave much credit to Delgado. Müller said "He’s definitely a great coach because he knows a lot".

In May 2016, Andy Murray appointed Delgado as his assistant coach. Delgado coached Murray to the 2016 Wimbledon Championships title, along with multiple other titles including the 2016 ATP World Tour Finals and the year end number one ranking. More recently, he coached Murray to the 2017 Dubai Tennis Championships and the 2019 European Open titles.

He has also coached Denis Shapovalov and Jack Draper. He is currently coaching Grigor Dimitrov.

== Early and personal life ==
Jamie Delgado was born in Birmingham but moved to Spain and was brought up in Tenerife until the age of ten when he moved back to England.

He had a promising junior career that included winning the 1989 under-12 British grass-court championships, he was the first Briton to win the 1991 under-14 Orange Bowl when he defeated Cavallaro. He also captured the 1994 Queen's Club junior tournament defeating Nicolás Lapentti. At Reed's School, he was a member of the David Lloyd Slater Squad, set up by financier Jim Slater and former pro David Lloyd. He turned professional in 1995 at the age of 18. He has a brother called Johnny Delgado who is one of the directors of Living Tennis based in Bisham, England.

== Senior career ==
=== 1995–2009 ===
He reached the quarterfinals of the President's Cup tournament in Kazakhstan in 2000.

Delgado's best performance at Wimbledon was making the third-round of the men's doubles in 2006 and again in 2009.

=== 2010 ===
Delgado began the 2010 season by winning the Tretorn SERIE+ GEMAX Open in Belgrade. He partnered home Favourite Ilija Bozoljac as they defeated Dustin Brown and Martin Slanar in straight sets 6–3, 6–3. He next competed at the French Open for the first time and this was also his first Grand Slam outside of Wimbledon. He partnered Evgeny Korolev of Kazakhstan but they lost in the first round in straight sets to the French duo Thierry Ascione and Laurent Recouderc 3–6, 5–7. Then at Wimbledon he partnered Josh Goodall to the second round where they lost in straight sets to Mahesh Bhupathi and Max Mirnyi 3–6, 4–6, 4–6. He won his second and final title of the season at the Guzzini Challenger partnering Croatia's Lovro Zovko. They defeated Charles-Antoine Brézac and Vincent Stouff in straight sets 7–6^{(8–6)}, 6–1.

=== 2011 ===
In January with now full-time partner Jonathan Marray, they won the Heilbronn Open Challenger defeating Frank Moser and David Škoch in straight sets 6–1, 6–4. They next won the BH Telecom Indoors Challenger in March, defeating Yves Allegro and Andreas Beck in straight sets 7–6^{(7–4)}, 6–2. Later that month, they won the Aegon GB Pro-Series Bath, defeating Yves Allegro and Andreas Beck in straight sets 6–3, 6–4. In May, they won their fourth title of the year at the BNP Paribas Primrose Bordeaux, defeating French duo Julien Benneteau and Nicolas Mahut in straight sets 7–5, 6–3. Then at Wimbledon they made it into the second round, where they were defeated by Wesley Moodie and Dick Norman in four sets 6–4, 6–7^{(5–7)}, 6–7^{(6–8)}, 2–6. They next competed at the US Open, where both Delgado and Marray had their best run at a Grand Slam outside of Wimbledon. They were defeated by sixth seeds and eventual tournament runners-up Mariusz Fyrstenberg and Marcin Matkowski in three sets 7–6^{(7–5)}, 2–6, 3–6. This raised his doubles ranking to a career-high No. 74 in the world. They won their fifth and final Challenger title of the year on home soil at the Aegon Pro-Series Loughborough, where they defeated Irish duo Sam Barry and Daniel Glancy in straight sets 6–2, 6–2.

=== 2012 ===
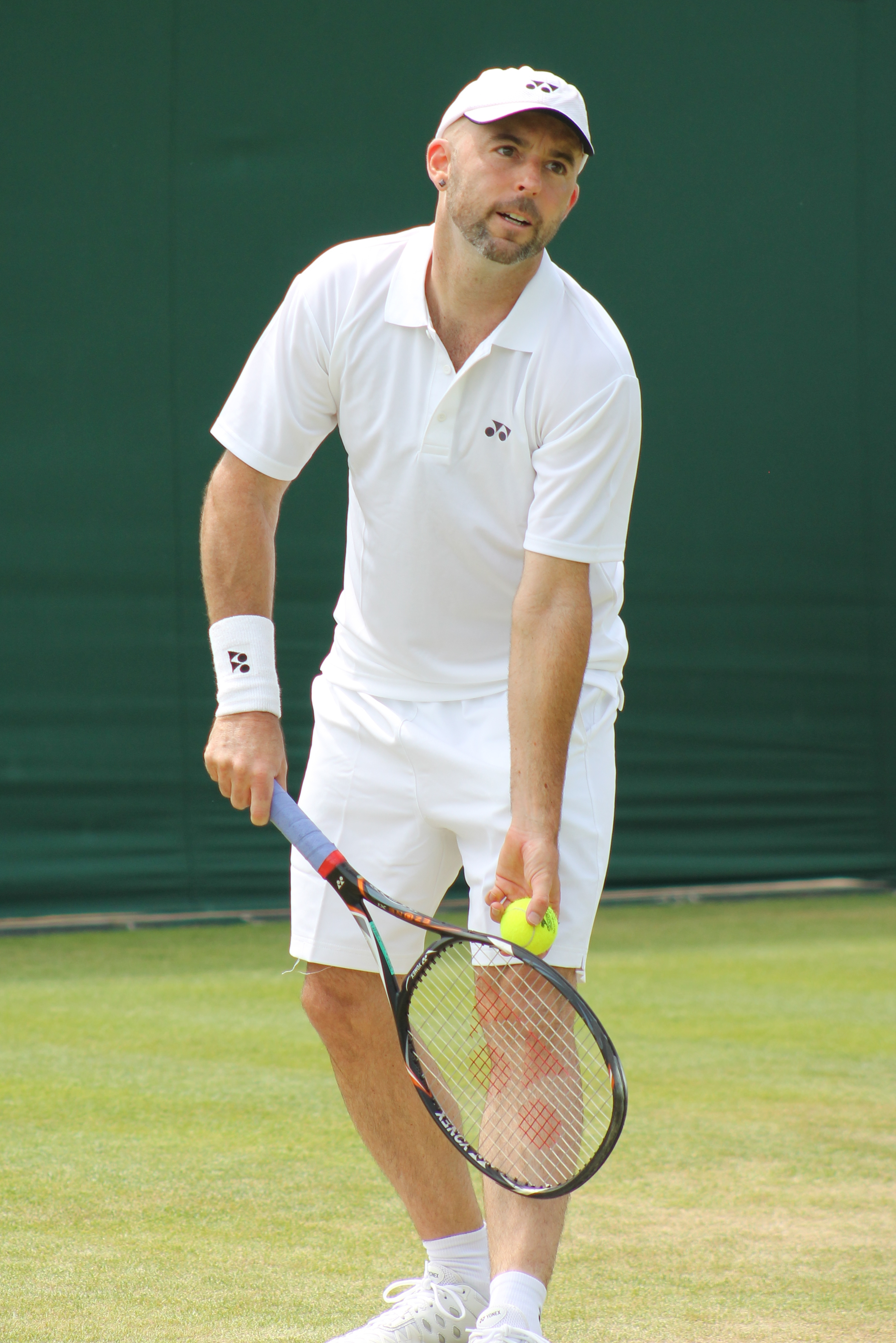
Jamie Delgado playing at the 2013 Wimbledon Championships

In January Delgado competed at the Australian Open where he partnered Jonathan Marray. They lost in the first round to the sixth seeds Mariusz Fyrstenberg and Marcin Matkowski in straight sets 6–4, 6–4.

June 2012 saw Delgado's first ATP Tour Final, at the Aegon International, partnering Ken Skupski. The pair were defeated by fellow Brits and good friends Colin Fleming and Ross Hutchins in straight sets 4–6, 3–6.

Having picked up a good run of form he next competed at Wimbledon again partnering Ken Skupski. They lost in the second round to the second seeds and defending champions Bob and Mike Bryan in straight sets 6–7^{(2–7)}, 0–6, 2–6. In the first round they beat German duo Matthias Bachinger and Tobias Kamke in four sets 6–3, 5–7, 6–3, 6–4.

A month after Wimbledon Skupski and Delgado got into their second final of the season at the Farmers Classic. They lost in three sets to Belgium duo Ruben Bemelmans and Xavier Malisse 6–7^{(5–7)}, 6–4, [10–7]. However this performance and recent good performances rose his doubles ranking to a career high No.66 in the world. At the 2012 US Open Delgado now with full-time partner Ken Skupski made it to the third round before losing to Spanish sixth seeds Marcel Granollers and Marc López in straight sets 2–6, 4–6. In the second round they defeated the defending champions Jürgen Melzer and Philipp Petzschner in straight sets.

=== 2013–2014 ===
In 2013, Delgado reached the second round of the men's doubles at Wimbledon, with partner Matthew Ebden.

At 2014 Wimbledon, Delgado broke the all-time male record for playing in consecutive Wimbledon tournaments, receiving a doubles wildcard with Luxembourg's Gilles Müller and reaching the second round. This was Delgado's 23rd Wimbledon appearance, at the age of 37, and his debut as a player-coach. Delgado/Müller's best doubles result was reaching the semifinals of the Tilia Slovenia Open.

Delgado continued playing with Gilles Müller until the Rakuten Japan Open on 29 September 2014. They lost in the first round, following which Delgado retired.

== ATP career finals ==
=== Doubles: 2 (2 runners-up) ===
Legend Grand Slam tournaments (0–0) ATP World Tour Finals (0–0) ATP World Tour Masters 1000 (0–0) ATP World Tour 500 Series (0–0) ATP World Tour 250 Series (0–2)	Titles by surface Hard (0–1) Clay (0–0) Grass (0–1)	Titles by setting Outdoor (0–2) Indoor (0–0)

Result	W–L	Date	Tournament	Tier	Surface	Partner	Opponents	Score
Loss	0–1	Jun 2012	Eastbourne International, United Kingdom	250 Series	Grass	(United Kingdom) Ken Skupski	(United Kingdom) Colin Fleming (United Kingdom) Ross Hutchins	4–6, 3–6
Loss	0–2	Jul 2012	Los Angeles Open, United States	250 Series	Hard	(United Kingdom) Ken Skupski	(Belgium) Ruben Bemelmans (Belgium) Xavier Malisse	6–7^{(5–7)}, 6–4, [7–10]

== Grand Slam performance timelines ==
Key
W	F	SF	QF	#R	RR	Q#	DNQ	A	NH

(W) winner; (F) finalist; (SF) semifinalist; (QF) quarterfinalist; (#R) rounds 4, 3, 2, 1; (RR) round-robin stage; (Q#) qualification round; (DNQ) did not qualify; (A) absent; (NH) not held; (SR) strike rate (events won / competed); (W–L) win–loss record.

=== Singles ===
Tournament	1997	1998	1999	2000	2001	2002	2003	2004	2005	2006	W–L
Australian Open	A	A	A	1R	A	A	A	A	A	A	0–1
French Open	A	A	A	A	A	A	A	A	A	A	0–0
Wimbledon	1R	A	2R	1R	2R	1R	1R	1R	1R	2R	3–9
US Open	A	A	A	1R	A	A	A	A	A	A	0–1
Win–loss	0–1	0–0	1–1	0–3	1–1	0–1	0–1	0–1	0–1	1–1	3–11

=== Doubles ===
Tournament	1993	1994	1995	1996	1997	1998	1999	2000	2001	2002	2003	2004	2005	2006	2007	2008	2009	2010	2011	2012	2013	2014	W–L
Australian Open	A	A	A	A	A	A	A	A	A	A	A	A	A	A	A	A	A	A	A	1R	1R	A	0–2
French Open	A	A	A	A	A	A	A	A	A	A	A	A	A	A	A	A	A	1R	A	A	A	A	0–1
Wimbledon	Q1	Q1	1R	1R	1R	1R	Q3	1R	1R	1R	1R	1R	1R	3R	1R	1R	3R	2R	2R	2R	2R	2R	9–19
US Open	A	A	A	A	A	A	A	A	A	A	A	A	A	A	A	A	A	A	3R	3R	A	A	4–2
Win–loss	0–0	0–0	0–1	0–1	0–1	0–1	0–0	0–1	0–1	0–1	0–1	0–1	0–1	2–1	0–1	0–1	2–1	1–2	3–2	3–3	1–2	1–1	13–24
