= 2010 Aegon International – Women's doubles =

Women's doubles
- 2010 Aegon International

Final
- Champions: (United States) Lisa Raymond (Australia) Rennae Stubbs
- Runners-up: (Czech Republic) Květa Peschke (Slovenia) Katarina Srebotnik
- Score: 6–2, 2–6, [13–11]

Details
- Draw: 16
- Seeds: 4

Events
Singles	men	women
Doubles	men	women
← 2009 ·	Eastbourne International	· 2011 →

Akgul Amanmuradova and Ai Sugiyama were the defending champions, however Sugiyama retired at the end of 2009 and Amanmuradova teamed up with Renata Voráčová and they lost in the first round to Cara Black and Daniela Hantuchová.
Lisa Raymond and Rennae Stubbs won in the final 6–2, 2–6, [13–11], against Květa Peschke and Katarina Srebotnik.

== Seeds ==
1. (United States) Liezel Huber / (Spain) María José Martínez Sánchez (semifinals, withdrew)
2. (Czech Republic) Květa Peschke / (Slovenia) Katarina Srebotnik (final)
3. (Russia) Alisa Kleybanova / (Italy) Francesca Schiavone (first round)
4. (United States) Lisa Raymond / (Australia) Rennae Stubbs (champions)

== Draw ==
=== Key ===
- Q = Qualifier
- WC = Wild card
- LL = Lucky loser
- Alt = Alternate
- SE = Special exempt
- PR = Protected ranking
- ITF = ITF entry
- JE = Junior exempt
- w/o = Walkover
- r = Retired
- d = Defaulted
- SR = Special ranking

=== Draw ===
First round
1	(United States) L Huber (Spain) MJ Martínez Sánchez	6	6
(Romania) E Gallovits (Russia) N Petrova	2	4
(Russia) V Dushevina (Russia) E Makarova	5	6	[8]
(Chinese Taipei) Y-j Chan (China) J Zheng	7	0	[10]
4	(United States) L Raymond (Australia) R Stubbs	7	6
(Belgium) K Clijsters (Russia) S Kuznetsova	6^{3}	3
(Chinese Taipei) C-j Chuang (Belarus) O Govortsova	6^{1}	0
(South Africa) N Grandin (United States) A Spears	7	6
(United Kingdom) A Keothavong (United Kingdom) M South	4	6	[7]
(Spain) V Ruano Pascual (United States) M Shaughnessy	6	3	[10]
(Poland) A Rosolska (China) Z Yan	6	7
3	(Russia) A Kleybanova (Italy) F Schiavone	3	6^{9}
(Uzbekistan) A Amanmuradova (Czech Republic) R Voráčová	3	3
(Zimbabwe) C Black (Slovakia) D Hantuchová	6	6
(Israel) S Pe'er (Italy) F Pennetta	1	5
2	(Czech Republic) K Peschke (Slovenia) K Srebotnik	6	7

Quarterfinals
1	(United States) L Huber (Spain) MJ Martínez Sánchez	6	6
(Chinese Taipei) Y-j Chan (China) J Zheng	2	2
4	(United States) L Raymond (Australia) R Stubbs	6	6
(South Africa) N Grandin (United States) A Spears	1	4
(Spain) V Ruano Pascual (United States) M Shaughnessy	6^{2}	2
(Poland) A Rosolska (China) Z Yan	7	6
(Zimbabwe) C Black (Slovakia) D Hantuchová	6^{4}	2
2	(Czech Republic) K Peschke (Slovenia) K Srebotnik	7	6

Semifinals
1	(United States) L Huber (Spain) MJ Martínez Sánchez	w	/	o
4	(United States) L Raymond (Australia) R Stubbs
(Poland) A Rosolska (China) Z Yan	4	5
2	(Czech Republic) K Peschke (Slovenia) K Srebotnik	6	7

Finals
4	(United States) L Raymond (Australia) R Stubbs	6	2	[13]
2	(Czech Republic) K Peschke (Slovenia) K Srebotnik	2	6	[11]
