= 2011 Aegon International – Women's singles =

Women's singles
- 2011 Aegon International

Final
- Champion: (France) Marion Bartoli
- Runner-up: (Czech Republic) Petra Kvitová
- Score: 6–1, 4–6, 7–5

Events
Singles	men	women
Doubles	men	women
← 2010 ·	Aegon International	· 2012 →

Marion Bartoli won the title, defeating Petra Kvitová in the final 6–1, 4–6, 7–5 to win the women's singles tennis title at the 2011 Eastbourne International. Bartoli won the title after saving a match point Lucie Šafářová had against her in the first round. Ekaterina Makarova was the defending champion, but lost to Kvitová in the second round.

This tournament was notable for being the first in which Serena Williams competed since her victory at the 2010 Wimbledon Championships, after battling a foot injury. She lost in the second round to Vera Zvonareva.

== Seeds ==
1. (Russia) Vera Zvonareva (quarterfinals)
2. (China) Li Na (second round)
3. (Belarus) Victoria Azarenka (quarterfinals, retired due to right groin injury)
4. (Italy) Francesca Schiavone (second round)
5. (Czech Republic) Petra Kvitová (final)
6. (France) Marion Bartoli (champion)
7. (Australia) Samantha Stosur (semifinals)
8. (Germany) Andrea Petkovic (first round)

== Draw ==
=== Key ===
- Q = Qualifier
- WC = Wild card
- LL = Lucky loser
- Alt = Alternate
- ITF = ITF entry
- PR = Protected ranking
- SR = Special ranking
- SE = Special exempt
- JE = Junior exempt
- JR = Junior Accelerator Programme entrant
- CO = College Accelerator Programme entrant
- NG = Next Gen Accelerator Program entrant
- w/o = Walkover
- r = Retired
- d = Defaulted

=== Finals ===
Semifinals
7	(Australia) Samantha Stosur	3	1
6	(France) Marion Bartoli	6	6
5	(Czech Republic) Petra Kvitová	7^{11}	4
(Slovakia) Daniela Hantuchová	6^{9}	2^{r}

Final
6	(France) Marion Bartoli	6	4	7
5	(Czech Republic) Petra Kvitová	1	6	5

=== Top half ===
First round
1	(Russia) V Zvonareva	6	6
WC	(United Kingdom) H Watson	3	3
(Bulgaria) T Pironkova	6	3	4
WC	(United States) S Williams	1	6	6
(Russia) A Pavlyuchenkova	6^{9}	4
Q	(Serbia) B Jovanovski	7^{11}	6
(Russia) N Petrova	1	4
7	(Australia) S Stosur	6	6
3	(Belarus) V Azarenka	6	7^{7}
(China) S Peng	4	6^{2}
(France) A Rezaï	2	1
WC	(United Kingdom) E Baltacha	6	6
(Spain) MJ Martínez Sánchez	7	6
(Israel) S Pe'er	5	3
(Czech Republic) L Šafářová	3	6	6^{7}
6	(France) M Bartoli	6	3	7^{9}

Second round
1	(Russia) V Zvonareva	3	7^{7}	7
WC	(United States) S Williams	6	6^{5}	5
Q	(Serbia) B Jovanovski	3	2
7	(Australia) S Stosur	6	6
3	(Belarus) V Azarenka	6	7^{7}
WC	(United Kingdom) E Baltacha	1	6^{0}
(Spain) MJ Martínez Sánchez	3	3
6	(France) M Bartoli	6	6

Quarterfinals
1	(Russia) V Zvonareva	6	6^{4}	4
7	(Australia) S Stosur	4	7^{7}	6
3	(Belarus) V Azarenka	2	0^{r}
6	(France) M Bartoli	6	2

Semifinals
7	(Australia) S Stosur	3	1
6	(France) M Bartoli	6	6

=== Bottom half ===
First round
5	(Czech Republic) P Kvitová	5	6	6
(Latvia) A Sevastova	7	1	3
(Russia) E Makarova	6	3	6
Q	(Croatia) M Lučić	1	6	4
(Poland) A Radwańska	7^{7}	7
(Australia) J Gajdošová	6^{5}	5
(Estonia) K Kanepi	6^{7}	1
4	(Italy) F Schiavone	7^{9}	6
8	(Germany) A Petkovic	5	7	3
(United States) V Williams	7	5	6
(Germany) J Görges	4	3
(Serbia) A Ivanovic	6	6
Q	(China) J Zheng	4	4
(Slovakia) D Hantuchová	6	6
Q	(Austria) T Paszek	5	4
2	(China) N Li	7	6

Second round
5	(Czech Republic) P Kvitová	7^{10}	7^{7}
(Russia) E Makarova	6^{8}	6^{4}
(Poland) A Radwańska	6	6
4	(Italy) F Schiavone	3	2
(United States) V Williams	6	6
(Serbia) A Ivanovic	3	2
(Slovakia) D Hantuchová	7^{9}	6
2	(China) N Li	6^{7}	3

Quarterfinals
5	(Czech Republic) P Kvitová	1	6	7^{7}
(Poland) A Radwańska	6	2	6^{2}
(United States) V Williams	2	7	2
(Slovakia) D Hantuchová	6	5	6

Semifinals
5	(Czech Republic) P Kvitová	7^{11}	4
(Slovakia) D Hantuchová	6^{9}	2^{r}
