= 2009 Aegon International =

- Date: 13–20 June
- Edition: 1st (men); 35th (women)
- Category: ATP World Tour 250; WTA Premier
- Surface: Grass / outdoor
- Location: Eastbourne, United Kingdom
- Venue: Devonshire Park LTC

Champions

Men's singles
- (Russia) Dmitry Tursunov

Women's singles
- (Denmark) Caroline Wozniacki

Men's doubles
- (Poland) Mariusz Fyrstenberg / (Poland) Marcin Matkowski

Women's doubles
- (Uzbekistan) Akgul Amanmuradova / (Japan) Ai Sugiyama
- Eastbourne International

The 2009 Aegon International was a combined men's and women's tennis tournament played on outdoor grass courts. It was the 35th edition of the event for the women and the 1st edition for the men. It was classified as a WTA Premier tournament on the 2009 WTA Tour and as an ATP World Tour 250 series on the 2009 ATP World Tour. The event took place at the Devonshire Park Lawn Tennis Club in Eastbourne, United Kingdom from 13 June through 20 June 2009.

== Finals ==
=== Men's singles ===
(Russia) Dmitry Tursunov defeated (Canada) Frank Dancevic, 6–3, 7–6(5)

- It was Tursunov's first title of the year and 6th of his career.

=== Women's singles ===
(Denmark) Caroline Wozniacki defeated (France) Virginie Razzano, 7–6(5), 7–5

- It was Wozniacki's second title of the year and 5th of her career.

=== Men's doubles ===
(Poland) Mariusz Fyrstenberg / (Poland) Marcin Matkowski defeated (United States) Travis Parrott / (Slovakia) Filip Polášek, 6–4, 6–4

=== Women's doubles ===
(Uzbekistan) Akgul Amanmuradova / (Japan) Ai Sugiyama defeated (Australia) Samantha Stosur / (Australia) Rennae Stubbs, 6–4, 6–3

== ATP entrants ==
=== Seeds ===
| Athlete | Nationality | Ranking* | Seeding |
|---|---|---|---|
| Igor Andreev | Russia | 26 | 1 |
| Dmitry Tursunov | Russia | 27 | 2 |
| Paul-Henri Mathieu | France | 37 | 3 |
| Fabrice Santoro | France | 38 | 4 |
| Mikhail Youzhny | Russia | 44 | 5 |
| Sam Querrey | United States | 46 | 6 |
| Andreas Seppi | Italy | 48 | 7 |
| Guillermo García-López | Spain | 52 | 8 |

- Seedings are based on the rankings as of June 8, 2009.

=== Other entrants ===
The following players received wildcards into the main draw:

- (United Kingdom) Joshua Goodall
- (United Kingdom) James Ward
- (United Kingdom) Colin Fleming

The following qualified for the main draw:

- (Japan) Tatsuma Ito
- (United Kingdom) Alex Bogdanović
- (Canada) Frank Dancevic
- (Australia) Brydan Klein

== WTA entrants ==
=== Seeds ===
| Athlete | Nationality | Ranking* | Seeding |
|---|---|---|---|
| Elena Dementieva | Russia | 4 | 1 |
| Svetlana Kuznetsova | Russia | 5 | 2 |
| Jelena Janković | Serbia | 6 | 3 |
| Vera Zvonareva | Russia | 7 | 4 |
| Victoria Azarenka | Belarus | 8 | 5 |
| Caroline Wozniacki | Denmark | 9 | 6 |
| Nadia Petrova | Russia | 10 | 7 |
| Agnieszka Radwańska | Poland | 11 | 8 |

- Seedings are based on the rankings as of June 8, 2009.

=== Other entrants ===
The following players received wildcards into the main draw:

- (Russia) Svetlana Kuznetsova
- (United Kingdom) Anne Keothavong
- (United Kingdom) Elena Baltacha

The following qualified for the main draw:

- (Russia) Ekaterina Makarova
- (Russia) Vera Dushevina
- (Slovakia) Jarmila Groth
- (Poland) Urszula Radwańska
