= 2010 Aegon International – Women's singles =

Women's singles
- 2010 Aegon International

Final
- Champion: (Russia) Ekaterina Makarova
- Runner-up: (Belarus) Victoria Azarenka
- Score: 7–6^{(7–5)}, 6–4

Events
Singles	men	women
Doubles	men	women
← 2009 ·	Aegon International	· 2011 →

Caroline Wozniacki was the defending champion, but lost to Aravane Rezaï in the first round.

Ekaterina Makarova won the title, defeating Victoria Azarenka in the final 7–6^{(7–5)}, 6–4.

== Seeds ==
1. (Denmark) Caroline Wozniacki (first round)
2. (Italy) Francesca Schiavone (first round)
3. (Australia) Samantha Stosur (semifinals)
4. (Poland) Agnieszka Radwańska (first round)
5. (Belgium) Kim Clijsters (quarterfinals)
6. (Italy) Flavia Pennetta (first round)
7. (China) Li Na (first round, retired due to left thigh strain)
8. (France) Marion Bartoli (semifinals)

== Draw ==
=== Key ===
- Q = Qualifier
- WC = Wild card
- LL = Lucky loser
- Alt = Alternate
- ITF = ITF entry
- PR = Protected ranking
- SR = Special ranking
- SE = Special exempt
- JE = Junior exempt
- JR = Junior Accelerator Programme entrant
- CO = College Accelerator Programme entrant
- NG = Next Gen Accelerator Program entrant
- w/o = Walkover
- r = Retired
- d = Defaulted

=== Finals ===
Semifinals
8	(France) Marion Bartoli	3	5
(Belarus) Victoria Azarenka	6	7
3	(Australia) Samantha Stosur	6^{5}	5
Q	(Russia) Ekaterina Makarova	7^{7}	7

Final
(Belarus) Victoria Azarenka	6^{5}	4
Q	(Russia) Ekaterina Makarova	7^{7}	6

=== Top half ===
First round
1	(Denmark) C Wozniacki	4	6	3
(France) A Rezaï	6	1	6
(Spain) MJ Martínez Sánchez	6	3	7
(Russia) V Zvonareva	3	6	5
(Belarus) O Govortsova	6	2	6^{2}
(Hungary) Á Szávay	3	6	7^{7}
(Russia) V Dushevina	4	5
8	(France) M Bartoli	6	7
4	(Poland) A Radwańska	6^{2}	1
(Belarus) V Azarenka	7^{7}	6
Q	(Canada) A Wozniak	3	2
Q	(United Kingdom) H Watson	6	6
(Russia) A Pavlyuchenkova	4	6	4
(Czech Republic) L Šafářová	6	3	6
(Belgium) Y Wickmayer	1	1
5	(Belgium) K Clijsters	6	6

Second round
(France) A Rezaï	2	0^{r}
(Spain) MJ Martínez Sánchez	6	3
(Hungary) Á Szávay	6	4	4
8	(France) M Bartoli	3	6	6
(Belarus) V Azarenka	6	6
Q	(United Kingdom) H Watson	1	1
(Czech Republic) L Šafářová	1	0
5	(Belgium) K Clijsters	6	6

Quarterfinals
(Spain) MJ Martínez Sánchez	7	4	6^{5}
8	(France) M Bartoli	5	6	7^{7}
(Belarus) V Azarenka	7^{8}	6
5	(Belgium) K Clijsters	6^{6}	4

Semifinals
8	(France) M Bartoli	3	5
(Belarus) V Azarenka	6	7

=== Bottom half ===
First round
7	(China) N Li	7^{8}	0^{r}
WC	(United Kingdom) E Baltacha	6^{6}	0
(Israel) S Pe'er	6	1	3
(China) J Zheng	1	6	6
WC	(United Kingdom) A Keothavong	4	2
(Slovakia) D Hantuchová	6	6
(United States) M Oudin	4	4
3	(Australia) S Stosur	6	6
6	(Italy) F Pennetta	6^{5}	1
Q	(Russia) E Makarova	7^{7}	6
Q	(Croatia) K Šprem	6	5	6^{4}
(Russia) N Petrova	2	7	7^{7}
(Russia) A Kleybanova	6	5	2
WC	(Russia) S Kuznetsova	4	7	6
(Romania) S Cîrstea	7	6
2	(Italy) F Schiavone	5	3

Second round
WC	(United Kingdom) E Baltacha	6	1	6
(China) J Zheng	2	6	3
(Slovakia) D Hantuchová	3	6	4
3	(Australia) S Stosur	6	3	6
Q	(Russia) E Makarova	6	6
(Russia) N Petrova	2	0
WC	(Russia) S Kuznetsova	4	7^{8}	7^{7}
(Romania) S Cîrstea	6	6^{6}	6^{4}

Quarterfinals
WC	(United Kingdom) E Baltacha	7^{7}	1	0
3	(Australia) S Stosur	6^{5}	6	6
Q	(Russia) E Makarova	6	7
WC	(Russia) S Kuznetsova	4	5

Semifinals
3	(Australia) S Stosur	6^{5}	5
Q	(Russia) E Makarova	7^{7}	7
