= 2009 Aegon International – Men's singles =

Men's singles
- 2009 Aegon International

Final
- Champion: (Russia) Dmitry Tursunov
- Runner-up: (Canada) Frank Dancevic
- Score: 6–3, 7–6^{(7–5)}

Events
Singles	men	women
Doubles	men	women
- Aegon International

Dmitry Tursunov won the title, defeating Frank Dancevic in the final 6–3, 7–6^{(7–5)}.

== Seeds ==
1. (Russia) Igor Andreev (first round)
2. (Russia) Dmitry Tursunov (champion)
3. (France) Paul-Henri Mathieu (first round)
4. (France) Fabrice Santoro (semifinals)
5. (Russia) Mikhail Youzhny (first round)
6. (United States) Sam Querrey (second round)
7. (Italy) Andreas Seppi (first round)
8. (Spain) Guillermo García-López (semifinals)

== Draw ==
Key

- Q = Qualifier
- WC = Wild card
- LL = Lucky loser
- Alt = Alternate
- ITF = ITF entry
- PR = Protected ranking
- SR = Special ranking
- SE = Special exempt
- JE = Junior exempt
- JR = Junior Accelerator Programme entrant
- CO = College Accelerator Programme entrant
- NG = Next Gen Accelerator Program entrant
- w/o = Walkover
- r = Retired
- d = Defaulted

=== Finals ===
Semifinals
Q	(Canada) Frank Dancevic	6	6
4	(France) Fabrice Santoro	4	4
8	(Spain) Guillermo García-López	2	2
2	(Russia) Dmitry Tursunov	6	6

Final
Q	(Canada) Frank Dancevic	3	6^{5}
2	(Russia) Dmitry Tursunov	6	7

=== Top half ===
First round
1	(Russia) I Andreev	6^{6}	2
Q	(Canada) F Dancevic	7	6
WC	(United Kingdom) J Ward	6	6
(Romania) V Crivoi	1	3
(Argentina) L Mayer	6	6
(Argentina) E Schwank	4	2
(France) J Benneteau	4	6	6
5	(Russia) M Youzhny	6	4	4
4	(France) F Santoro	6	6
(United States) R Kendrick	3	2
(Kazakhstan) A Golubev	3	4
(United States) R Ginepri	6	6
Q	(Japan) T Ito	4	1
WC	(United Kingdom) J Goodall	6	6
(Croatia) I Ljubičić	7	7
7	(Italy) A Seppi	6^{4}	5

Second round
Q	(Canada) F Dancevic	7	6
WC	(United Kingdom) J Ward	6^{6}	4
(Argentina) L Mayer	6	6
(France) J Benneteau	4	4
4	(France) F Santoro	4	6	6
(United States) R Ginepri	6	4	1
WC	(United Kingdom) J Goodall	3	5
(Croatia) I Ljubičić	6	7

Quarterfinals
Q	(Canada) F Dancevic	6^{4}	6	7
(Argentina) L Mayer	7	4	5
4	(France) F Santoro	3	4
(Croatia) I Ljubičić	6	2	r

Semifinals
Q	(Canada) F Dancevic	6	6
4	(France) F Santoro	4	4

=== Bottom half ===
First round
8	(Spain) G García-López	6	6^{3}	6
(Russia) E Korolev	2	7	2
WC	(United Kingdom) C Fleming	6^{2}	6	3
(Chinese Taipei) Y-h Lu	7	1	6
Q	(Australia) B Klein	6	5	6
(Russia) T Gabashvili	3	7	1
(Serbia) J Tipsarević	6	6
3	(France) P-H Mathieu	4	2
6	(United States) S Querrey	6	7
(Chile) P Capdeville	2	5
(Uzbekistan) D Istomin	7	7
(United States) K Kim	6^{5}	5
Q	(United Kingdom) A Bogdanovic	6	7
(Czech Republic) I Minář	4	6^{3}
(Italy) F Fognini	3	6	4
2	(Russia) D Tursunov	6	4	6

Second round
8	(Spain) G García-López	6	6^{0}	7
(Chinese Taipei) Y-h Lu	4	7	6^{3}
Q	(Australia) B Klein	6^{5}	1
(Serbia) J Tipsarević	7	6
6	(United States) S Querrey	6	6^{3}	4
(Uzbekistan) D Istomin	3	7	6
Q	(United Kingdom) A Bogdanovic	7	4	6^{5}
2	(Russia) D Tursunov	6^{2}	6	7

Quarterfinals
8	(Spain) G García-López	6	3	6
(Serbia) J Tipsarević	4	6	3
(Uzbekistan) D Istomin	6^{6}	4
2	(Russia) D Tursunov	7	6

Semifinals
8	(Spain) G García-López	2	2
2	(Russia) D Tursunov	6	6
