= 2009 Aegon International – Women's doubles =

Women's doubles
- 2009 Aegon International

Final
- Champions: (Uzbekistan) Akgul Amanmuradova (Japan) Ai Sugiyama
- Runners-up: (Australia) Samantha Stosur (Australia) Rennae Stubbs
- Score: 6–4, 6–3

Details
- Draw: 16
- Seeds: 4

Events
Singles	men	women
Doubles	men	women
- Eastbourne International

Cara Black and Liezel Huber are the defending champions, but lost in the semifinals to Samantha Stosur and Rennae Stubbs

== Seeds ==
1. (Zimbabwe) Cara Black / (United States) Liezel Huber (semifinals)
2. (Czech Republic) Květa Peschke / (United States) Lisa Raymond (withdrew)
3. (Spain) Anabel Medina Garrigues / (Spain) Virginia Ruano Pascual (first round)
4. (Australia) Samantha Stosur / (Australia) Rennae Stubbs (final)

== Draw ==
Key

- Q = Qualifier
- WC = Wild card
- LL = Lucky loser
- Alt = Alternate
- ITF = ITF entry
- PR = Protected ranking
- SR = Special ranking
- SE = Special exempt
- JE = Junior exempt
- JR = Junior Accelerator Programme entrant
- CO = College Accelerator Programme entrant
- NG = Next Gen Accelerator Program entrant
- w/o = Walkover
- r = Retired
- d = Defaulted

=== Draw ===
First round
1	(Zimbabwe) C Black (United States) L Huber	6	6
WC	(Serbia) A Ivanovic (Germany) S Lisicki	1	2
(United States) J Craybas (Russia) A Kudryavtseva	2	7	[17]
(Slovakia) J Husárová (Russia) M Kirilenko	6	5	[19]
4	(Australia) S Stosur (Australia) R Stubbs	7	6
(Chinese Taipei) C-J Chuang (India) S Mirza	5	4
(United States) B Mattek-Sands (Russia) N Petrova	6	6
(Turkey) İ Şenoğlu (China) Z Yan	1	4
(Russia) A Kleybanova (Russia) E Makarova	6^{7}	3
(United States) V King (China) J Zheng	7	6
(Russia) V Dushevina (Kazakhstan) G Voskoboeva	4	7	[11]
3	(Spain) A Medina Garrigues (Spain) V Ruano Pascual	6	6^{6}	[9]
(Argentina) G Dulko (Spain) MJ Martínez Sánchez	6	3	[8]
(Uzbekistan) A Amanmuradova (Japan) A Sugiyama	4	6	[10]
WC	(United Kingdom) S Borwell (United Kingdom) A Keothavong	7	6
ALT	(Poland) K Jans (Poland) A Rosolska	6^{4}	3

Quarterfinals
1	(Zimbabwe) C Black (United States) L Huber	6	6
(Slovakia) J Husárová (Russia) M Kirilenko	2	2
4	(Australia) S Stosur (Australia) R Stubbs	w/o
(United States) B Mattek-Sands (Russia) N Petrova
(United States) V King (China) J Zheng	6	7
(Russia) V Dushevina (Kazakhstan) G Voskoboeva	2	5
(Uzbekistan) A Amanmuradova (Japan) A Sugiyama	7	6
WC	(United Kingdom) S Borwell (United Kingdom) A Keothavong	6^{3}	3

Semifinals
1	(Zimbabwe) C Black (United States) L Huber	4	6^{5}
4	(Australia) S Stosur (Australia) R Stubbs	6	7
(United States) V King (China) J Zheng	3	4
(Uzbekistan) A Amanmuradova (Japan) A Sugiyama	6	6

Final
4	(Australia) S Stosur (Australia) R Stubbs	4	3
(Uzbekistan) A Amanmuradova (Japan) A Sugiyama	6	6
