= 2011 Aegon International =

- Date: June 11–18
- Edition: 3rd (men); 37th (women)
- Category: ATP World Tour 250; WTA Premier
- Surface: Grass
- Location: Eastbourne, United Kingdom
- Venue: Devonshire Park LTC

Champions

Men's singles
- (Italy) Andreas Seppi

Women's singles
- (France) Marion Bartoli

Men's doubles
- (Israel) Jonathan Erlich / (Israel) Andy Ram

Women's doubles
- (Czech Republic) Květa Peschke / (Slovenia) Katarina Srebotnik
- Aegon International

The 2011 Aegon International was a combined men's and women's tennis tournament played on outdoor grass courts. It was the 37th edition of the event for the women and the 3rd edition for the men. It was classified as a WTA Premier tournament on the 2011 WTA Tour and as an ATP World Tour 250 series on the 2011 ATP World Tour. The event took place at the Devonshire Park Lawn Tennis Club in Eastbourne, United Kingdom from June 11 through June 18, 2011. The men's doubles final was originally scheduled to take place on June 17, but due to rain delays it was eventually played on June 19 at Roehampton instead.

== Finals ==
=== Men's singles ===
(Italy) Andreas Seppi defeated (Serbia) Janko Tipsarević, 7–6^{(7–5)}, 3–6, 5–3 ret.

- It was Seppi's 1st career title.

=== Women's singles ===
(France) Marion Bartoli defeated (Czech Republic) Petra Kvitová, 6–1, 4–6, 7–5

- It was Bartoli's 1st title of the year and 6th of her career. It was her 2nd career Premier-level title. It was her first grass title.

=== Men's doubles ===
- (Israel) Jonathan Erlich / (Israel) Andy Ram defeated (Bulgaria) Grigor Dimitrov / (Italy) Andreas Seppi, 6–3, 6–3

=== Women's doubles ===
(Czech Republic) Květa Peschke / (Slovenia) Katarina Srebotnik defeated (United States) Liezel Huber / (United States) Lisa Raymond, 6–3, 6–0

== ATP entrants ==
=== Seeds ===
Country	Player	Rank^{*}	Seed
FRA	Jo-Wilfried Tsonga	19	1
UKR	Alexandr Dolgopolov	21	2
SRB	Janko Tipsarević	31	3
ESP	Guillermo García López	33	4
UKR	Sergiy Stakhovsky	36	5
RSA	Kevin Anderson	39	6
ESP	Pablo Andújar	48	7
GER	Philipp Kohlschreiber	49	8

- Seedings are based on the rankings as of June 6, 2011.

=== Other entrants ===
The following players received wildcards into the main draw:

- (United Kingdom) Daniel Cox
- (United Kingdom) Daniel Evans
- (United Kingdom) Colin Fleming

The following player(s) were promoted into the main draw as special exempts:

- (United Kingdom) James Ward

The following qualified for the main draw:

- (Germany) Rainer Schüttler
- (United Kingdom) Alexander Slabinsky
- (United States) Donald Young
- (Russia) Evgeny Kirillov

The following player(s) were promoted into the main draw as lucky losers:

- (Ukraine) Illya Marchenko

== WTA entrants ==
=== Seeds ===
Country	Player	Rank^{*}	Seed
RUS	Vera Zvonareva	3	1
CHN	Li Na	4	2
BLR	Victoria Azarenka	5	3
ITA	Francesca Schiavone	7	4
CZE	Petra Kvitová	8	5
FRA	Marion Bartoli	9	6
AUS	Samantha Stosur	10	7
GER	Andrea Petkovic	11	8

- Seedings are based on the rankings as of June 6, 2011.

=== Other entrants ===
The following players received wildcards into the main draw:

- (United Kingdom) Elena Baltacha
- (United Kingdom) Heather Watson
- (United States) Serena Williams

The following qualified for the main draw:

- (China) Zheng Jie
- (Serbia) Bojana Jovanovski
- (Croatia) Mirjana Lučić
- (Austria) Tamira Paszek
