= 2011 Aegon International – Women's doubles =

Women's doubles
- 2011 Aegon International

Final
- Champions: (Czech Republic) Květa Peschke (Slovenia) Katarina Srebotnik
- Runners-up: (United States) Liezel Huber (United States) Lisa Raymond
- Score: 6–3, 6–0

Details
- Draw: 16
- Seeds: 4

Events
| Singles | men | women |
| Doubles | men | women |
| ← 2010 · | Eastbourne International | · 2012 → |

Lisa Raymond and Rennae Stubbs were the defending champions, but Stubbs decided not to participate.
Raymond played alongside Liezel Huber, but defeated 1st seed Květa Peschke and Katarina Srebotnik them 6–3, 6–0 in the final.

== Seeds ==
1. (Czech Republic) Květa Peschke / (Slovenia) Katarina Srebotnik (champions)
2. (United States) Liezel Huber / (United States) Lisa Raymond (final)
3. (India) Sania Mirza / (Russia) Elena Vesnina (first round)
4. (United States) Bethanie Mattek-Sands / (United States) Meghann Shaughnessy (semifinals)

== Draw ==
=== Key ===
- Q = Qualifier
- WC = Wild card
- LL = Lucky loser
- Alt = Alternate
- SE = Special exempt
- PR = Protected ranking
- ITF = ITF entry
- JE = Junior exempt
- w/o = Walkover
- r = Retired
- d = Defaulted
- SR = Special ranking

=== Draw ===
First round
1 | (Czech Republic) K Peschke (Slovenia) K Srebotnik | 6 | 4 | [10]
(Russia) A Pavlyuchenkova (Russia) V Zvonareva | 4 | 6 | [6]
(South Africa) N Grandin (Czech Republic) V Uhlířová | 6 | 6
(Chinese Taipei) C-j Chuang (Chinese Taipei) S-w Hsieh | 4 | 3
3 | (India) S Mirza (Russia) E Vesnina | 7 | 4 | [6]
(Australia) J Gajdošová (Australia) S Stosur | 5 | 6 | [10]
(Spain) MJ Martínez Sánchez (Spain) A Medina Garrigues | 6 | 6
(United States) J Craybas (Russia) V Dushevina | 1 | 4
WC | (United Kingdom) A Keothavong (United Kingdom) H Watson | 0 | 2
(China) S Peng (China) J Zheng | 6 | 6
(Poland) K Jans (Poland) A Rosolska | 1 | 6 | [5]
4 | (United States) B Mattek-Sands (United States) M Shaughnessy | 6 | 1 | [10]
(Zimbabwe) C Black (Israel) S Pe'er | 6 | 6
(Russia) N Petrova (Australia) A Rodionova | 2 | 3
(Czech Republic) A Hlaváčková (Czech Republic) L Hradecká | 4 | 6^{6}
2 | (United States) L Huber (United States) L Raymond | 6 | 7^{8}

Quarterfinals
1 | (Czech Republic) K Peschke (Slovenia) K Srebotnik | 6 | 6
(South Africa) N Grandin (Czech Republic) V Uhlířová | 1 | 3
(Australia) J Gajdošová (Australia) S Stosur | 6 | 1 | [4]
(Spain) MJ Martínez Sánchez (Spain) A Medina Garrigues | 1 | 6 | [10]
(China) S Peng (China) J Zheng | 3 | 6^{7}
4 | (United States) B Mattek-Sands (United States) M Shaughnessy | 6 | 7^{9}
(Zimbabwe) C Black (Israel) S Pe'er | 6^{5} | 0
2 | (United States) L Huber (United States) L Raymond | 7^{7} | 6

Semifinals
1 | (Czech Republic) K Peschke (Slovenia) K Srebotnik | 6 | 6
(Spain) MJ Martínez Sánchez (Spain) A Medina Garrigues | 4 | 3
4 | (United States) B Mattek-Sands (United States) M Shaughnessy | 1 | 2
2 | (United States) L Huber (United States) L Raymond | 6 | 6

Final
1 | (Czech Republic) K Peschke (Slovenia) K Srebotnik | 6 | 6
2 | (United States) L Huber (United States) L Raymond | 3 | 0
