= 2011 Aegon International – Men's singles =

Men's singles
- 2011 Aegon International

Final
- Champion: (Italy) Andreas Seppi
- Runner-up: (Serbia) Janko Tipsarević
- Score: 7–6^{(7–5)}, 3–6, 5–3 ret.

Events
| Singles | men | women |
| Doubles | men | women |
- Aegon International

Michaël Llodra was the defending champion, but chose not to compete.

Andreas Seppi won the title, defeating Janko Tipsarević in the final after Tipsarević retired with Seppi leading 7–6^{(7–5)}, 3–6, 5–3. It was his first ATP Tour singles title.

== Seeds ==
1. (France) Jo-Wilfried Tsonga (second round)
2. (Ukraine) Alexandr Dolgopolov (first round)
3. (Serbia) Janko Tipsarević (final, retired due to a right hip injury)
4. (Spain) Guillermo García-López (first round)
5. (Ukraine) Sergiy Stakhovsky (first round)
6. (South Africa) Kevin Anderson (second round)
7. (Spain) Pablo Andújar (first round)
8. (Germany) Philipp Kohlschreiber (withdrew)

== Draw ==
Key

- Q = Qualifier
- WC = Wild card
- LL = Lucky loser
- Alt = Alternate
- ITF = ITF entry
- PR = Protected ranking
- SR = Special ranking
- SE = Special exempt
- JE = Junior exempt
- JR = Junior Accelerator Programme entrant
- CO = College Accelerator Programme entrant
- NG = Next Gen Accelerator Program entrant
- w/o = Walkover
- r = Retired
- d = Defaulted

=== Finals ===
Semifinals
(Japan) Kei Nishikori | 2 | 4
3 | (Serbia) Janko Tipsarević | 6 | 6
(Russia) Igor Kunitsyn | 4 | 6 | 4
(Italy) Andreas Seppi | 6 | 2 | 6

Final
3 | (Serbia) Janko Tipsarević | 6^{5} | 6 | 3^{r}
(Italy) Andreas Seppi | 7^{7} | 3 | 5

=== Top half ===
First round
1 | (France) J-W Tsonga | 6 | 7
(Uzbekistan) D Istomin | 2 | 5
(Czech Republic) R Štěpánek | 6 | 6
WC | (United Kingdom) C Fleming | 3 | 4
(Japan) K Nishikori | 7 | 6
Q | (Russia) E Kirillov | 5 | 1
Q | (Germany) R Schüttler | 6 | 6
5 | (Ukraine) S Stakhovsky | 3 | 2
3 | (Serbia) J Tipsarević | 6 | 4 | 6
SE | (United Kingdom) J Ward | 3 | 6 | 2
(Kazakhstan) M Kukushkin | 6 | 6
(Chinese Taipei) Y-h Lu | 3 | 3
(Bulgaria) G Dimitrov | 2 | 7^{7} | 6
WC | (United Kingdom) D Evans | 6 | 6^{5} | 4
Q | (United Kingdom) A Slabinsky | 5 | 3
6 | (South Africa) K Anderson | 7 | 6

Second round
1 | (France) J-W Tsonga | 2 | 3
(Czech Republic) R Štěpánek | 6 | 6
(Japan) K Nishikori | 6 | 4 | 6
Q | (Germany) R Schüttler | 4 | 6 | 2
3 | (Serbia) J Tipsarević | 6 | 7^{7}
(Kazakhstan) M Kukushkin | 3 | 6^{2}
(Bulgaria) G Dimitrov | 6 | 6
6 | (South Africa) K Anderson | 3 | 2

Quarterfinals
(Czech Republic) R Štěpánek | 2 | 3
(Japan) K Nishikori | 6 | 6
3 | (Serbia) J Tipsarević | 6 | 7^{7}
(Bulgaria) G Dimitrov | 3 | 6^{2}

Semifinals
(Japan) K Nishikori | 2 | 4
3 | (Serbia) J Tipsarević | 6 | 6

=== Bottom half ===
First round
7 | (Spain) P Andújar | 5 | 1
(Russia) I Kunitsyn | 7 | 6
LL | (Ukraine) I Marchenko | 6 | 6
(Portugal) F Gil | 1 | 3
(France) J Benneteau | 6 | 7^{7}
(United States) R Sweeting | 2 | 6^{4}
(India) S Devvarman | 6 | 6
4 | (Spain) G García-López | 3 | 4
Q | (United States) D Young | 6 | 7
WC | (United Kingdom) D Cox | 1 | 5
(Italy) A Seppi | 3 | 6 | 6
(Germany) T Kamke | 6 | 1 | 4
(Australia) L Hewitt | 2 | 0^{r}
(Belgium) O Rochus | 6 | 3
(Argentina) C Berlocq | 7 | 6
2 | (Ukraine) A Dolgopolov | 5 | 2

Second round
(Russia) I Kunitsyn | 6 | 1 | 6
LL | (Ukraine) I Marchenko | 3 | 6 | 2
(France) J Benneteau | 7^{7} | 6^{6} | 6
(India) S Devvarman | 6^{1} | 7^{8} | 3
Q | (United States) D Young | 6^{1} | 3
(Italy) A Seppi | 7^{7} | 6
(Belgium) O Rochus | 3 | 7^{7} | 7^{7}
(Argentina) C Berlocq | 6 | 6^{5} | 6^{3}

Quarterfinals
(Russia) I Kunitsyn | 6 | 6
(France) J Benneteau | 3 | 2
(Italy) A Seppi | 6 | 6^{5} | 6
(Belgium) O Rochus | 2 | 7^{7} | 3

Semifinals
(Russia) I Kunitsyn | 4 | 6 | 4
(Italy) A Seppi | 6 | 2 | 6
