= 2010 Aegon International =

- Date: 12–19 June
- Edition: 2nd (men); 36th (women)
- Category: ATP World Tour 250; WTA Premier
- Surface: Grass
- Location: Eastbourne, United Kingdom
- Venue: Devonshire Park LTC

Champions

Men's singles
- (France) Michaël Llodra

Women's singles
- (Russia) Ekaterina Makarova

Men's doubles
- (Poland) Mariusz Fyrstenberg / (Poland) Marcin Matkowski

Women's doubles
- (United States) Lisa Raymond / (Australia) Rennae Stubbs
- Eastbourne International

The 2010 Aegon International was a combined men's and women's tennis tournament played on outdoor grass courts. It was the 36th edition of the event for the women and the 2nd edition for the men. It was classified as a WTA Premier tournament on the 2010 WTA Tour and as an ATP World Tour 250 series on the 2010 ATP World Tour. The event took place at the Devonshire Park Lawn Tennis Club in Eastbourne, United Kingdom from 13 June until 19 June 2010.

== Finals ==
=== Men's singles ===
(France) Michaël Llodra defeated (Spain) Guillermo García-López, 7–5, 6–2

- It was Llodra's 2nd title of the year and 5th of his career.

=== Women's singles ===
(Russia) Ekaterina Makarova defeated (Belarus) Victoria Azarenka 7–6^{(7–5)}, 6–4

- It was Makarova's first career title.

=== Men's doubles ===
(Poland) Mariusz Fyrstenberg / (Poland) Marcin Matkowski defeated (United Kingdom) Colin Fleming / (United Kingdom) Ken Skupski 6–3, 5–7, [10–8]

=== Women's doubles ===
(United States) Lisa Raymond / (Australia) Rennae Stubbs defeated (Czech Republic) Květa Peschke / (Slovenia) Katarina Srebotnik, 6–2, 2–6, [13–11]

== ATP entrants ==
=== Seeds ===
Athlete	Nationality	Ranking*	Seeding
Nicolás Almagro	Spain	18	1
Feliciano López	Spain	31	2
Gilles Simon	France	33	3
Julien Benneteau	France	38	4
Guillermo García-López	Spain	40	5
Horacio Zeballos	Argentina	42	6
Alexandr Dolgopolov	Ukraine	46	7
Michaël Llodra	France	47	8

- Seedings are based on the rankings as of June 7, 2010.

=== Other entrants ===
The following players received wildcards into the main draw:

- (United Kingdom) Jamie Baker
- (France) Gilles Simon
- (United Kingdom) James Ward

The following qualified for the main draw:

- (Germany) Martin Emmrich
- (Russia) Andrey Kuznetsov
- (Ecuador) Giovanni Lapentti
- (Japan) Kei Nishikori

== WTA entrants ==
=== Seeds ===
Athlete	Nationality	Ranking*	Seeding
Caroline Wozniacki	Denmark	3	1
Francesca Schiavone	Italy	6	2
Samantha Stosur	Australia	7	3
Agnieszka Radwańska	Poland	8	4
Kim Clijsters	Belgium	9	5
Flavia Pennetta	Italy	10	6
Li Na	China	11	7
Marion Bartoli	France	12	8

- Seedings are based on the rankings as of June 7, 2010.

=== Other entrants ===
The following players received wildcards into the main draw:

- (United Kingdom) Elena Baltacha
- (United Kingdom) Anne Keothavong
- (Russia) Svetlana Kuznetsova

The following players qualified for the main draw:

- (Russia) Ekaterina Makarova
- (Croatia) Karolina Šprem
- (United Kingdom) Heather Watson
- (Canada) Aleksandra Wozniak
