= 2011 Aegon International – Men's doubles =

Men's doubles
- 2011 Aegon International

Final
- Champions: (Israel) Jonathan Erlich (Israel) Andy Ram
- Runners-up: (Bulgaria) Grigor Dimitrov (Italy) Andreas Seppi
- Score: 6–3, 6–3

Events
Singles	men	women
Doubles	men	women
← 2010 ·	Aegon International	· 2012 →

Mariusz Fyrstenberg and Marcin Matkowski were the defending champions, but were eliminated in the first round by Jonathan Erlich and Andy Ram who won the tournament.

The final was first abandoned due to rain, but eventually played with Erlich and Ram defeating Grigor Dimitrov and Andreas Seppi in the final, 6–3, 6–3.

== Seeds ==
1. (India) Rohan Bopanna / (Pakistan) Aisam-ul-Haq Qureshi (quarterfinals)
2. (Poland) Mariusz Fyrstenberg / (Poland) Marcin Matkowski (first round)
3. (Brazil) Marcelo Melo / (Brazil) Bruno Soares (semifinals)
4. (Mexico) Santiago González / (United States) Scott Lipsky (first round)

== Draw ==
=== Key ===
- Q = Qualifier
- WC = Wild card
- LL = Lucky loser
- Alt = Alternate
- SE = Special exempt
- PR = Protected ranking
- ITF = ITF entry
- JE = Junior exempt
- w/o = Walkover
- r = Retired
- d = Defaulted
- SR = Special ranking

=== Draw ===
First round
1	(India) R Bopanna (Pakistan) A-u-H Qureshi	6	6
(Spain) P Andújar (Spain) G García-López	3	4
(Bulgaria) G Dimitrov (Italy) A Seppi	4	6	[10]
(Argentina) C Berlocq (Brazil) F Ferreiro	6	1	[6]
4	(Mexico) S González (United States) S Lipsky	5	7^{8}	[7]
(Austria) J Knowle (Brazil) A Sá	7	6^{6}	[10]
WC	(United Kingdom) C Fleming (United Kingdom) R Hutchins	7^{7}	1	[12]
(Sweden) S Aspelin (Australia) P Hanley	6^{5}	6	[10]
(India) S Devvarman (The Bahamas) M Knowles	3	4
(Chinese Taipei) Y-h Lu (Austria) O Marach	6	6
WC	(United Kingdom) J Delgado (United Kingdom) J Ward	7^{8}	4	[6]
3	(Brazil) M Melo (Brazil) B Soares	6^{6}	6	[10]
(United Kingdom) J Murray (Ukraine) S Stakhovsky	3	6	[11]
(France) J Benneteau (France) J-W Tsonga	6	2	[13]
(Israel) J Erlich (Israel) A Ram	6	6
2	(Poland) M Fyrstenberg (Poland) M Matkowski	4	4

Quarterfinals
1	(India) R Bopanna (Pakistan) A-u-H Qureshi	5	3
(Bulgaria) G Dimitrov (Italy) A Seppi	7	6
(Austria) J Knowle (Brazil) A Sá	6	5	[10]
WC	(United Kingdom) C Fleming (United Kingdom) R Hutchins	4	7	[12]
(Chinese Taipei) Y-h Lu (Austria) O Marach	6^{5}	6	[6]
3	(Brazil) M Melo (Brazil) B Soares	7^{7}	4	[10]
(France) J Benneteau (France) J-W Tsonga
(Israel) J Erlich (Israel) A Ram	w/o

Semifinals
(Bulgaria) G Dimitrov (Italy) A Seppi	7	7^{7}
WC	(United Kingdom) C Fleming (United Kingdom) R Hutchins	5	6^{5}
3	(Brazil) M Melo (Brazil) B Soares	3	7^{9}	[11]
(Israel) J Erlich (Israel) A Ram	6	6^{7}	[13]

Final
(Bulgaria) G Dimitrov (Italy) A Seppi	3	3
(Israel) J Erlich (Israel) A Ram	6	6
