= 2010 Aegon International – Men's doubles =

Men's doubles
- 2010 Aegon International

Final
- Champions: (Poland) Mariusz Fyrstenberg (Poland) Marcin Matkowski
- Runners-up: (United Kingdom) Colin Fleming (United Kingdom) Ken Skupski
- Score: 6–3, 5–7, [10–8]

Events
Singles	men	women
Doubles	men	women
← 2009 ·	Aegon International	· 2011 →

Mariusz Fyrstenberg and Marcin Matkowski were the defending champions and they won in the final 6–3, 5–7, [10–8] Colin Fleming and Ken Skupski.

== Seeds ==
1. (Poland) Łukasz Kubot / (Austria) Oliver Marach (first round)
2. (Poland) Mariusz Fyrstenberg / (Poland) Marcin Matkowski (champions)
3. (Austria) Julian Knowle / (Israel) Andy Ram (first round)
4. (Sweden) Simon Aspelin / (Australia) Paul Hanley (semifinals)

== Main draw ==
=== Key ===
- Q = Qualifier
- WC = Wild card
- LL = Lucky loser
- Alt = Alternate
- SE = Special exempt
- PR = Protected ranking
- ITF = ITF entry
- JE = Junior exempt
- w/o = Walkover
- r = Retired
- d = Defaulted
- SR = Special ranking

=== Draw ===
First round
1	(Poland) Ł Kubot (Austria) O Marach	1	3
(Brazil) M Melo (Brazil) B Soares	6	6
WC	(United Kingdom) J Delgado (United Kingdom) D Inglot	2	2
(France) J Benneteau (France) M Llodra	6	6
3	(Austria) J Knowle (Israel) A Ram	4	6^{5}
(United Kingdom) C Fleming (United Kingdom) K Skupski	6	7
(Spain) N Almagro (Argentina) E Schwank	2	6^{4}
WC	(United Kingdom) J Baker (United Kingdom) J Ward	6	7
(United Kingdom) J Marray (United Kingdom) J Murray	4	7	[2]
(Kazakhstan) A Golubev (Italy) A Seppi	6	5	[10]
(United Kingdom) R Hutchins (Australia) J Kerr	3	3
4	(Sweden) S Aspelin (Australia) P Hanley	6	6
(Germany) M Emmrich (Sweden) A Siljeström	6	3	[8]
(Argentina) L Mayer (Argentina) H Zeballos	3	6	[10]
(Czech Republic) L Friedl (Serbia) D Vemić	6^{4}	2
2	(Poland) M Fyrstenberg (Poland) M Matkowski	7	6

Quarterfinals
(Brazil) M Melo (Brazil) B Soares
(France) J Benneteau (France) M Llodra	w/o
(United Kingdom) C Fleming (United Kingdom) K Skupski	6	6
WC	(United Kingdom) J Baker (United Kingdom) J Ward	4	2
(Kazakhstan) A Golubev (Italy) A Seppi	1	4
4	(Sweden) S Aspelin (Australia) P Hanley	6	6
(Argentina) L Mayer (Argentina) H Zeballos	2	4
2	(Poland) M Fyrstenberg (Poland) M Matkowski	6	6

Semifinals
(Brazil) M Melo (Brazil) B Soares	4	4
(United Kingdom) C Fleming (United Kingdom) K Skupski	6	6
4	(Sweden) S Aspelin (Australia) P Hanley	6	3	[9]
2	(Poland) M Fyrstenberg (Poland) M Matkowski	4	6	[11]

Finals
(United Kingdom) C Fleming (United Kingdom) K Skupski	3	7	[8]
2	(Poland) M Fyrstenberg (Poland) M Matkowski	6	5	[10]
