= 2010 Aegon International – Men's singles =

Men's singles
- 2010 Aegon International

Final
- Champion: (France) Michaël Llodra
- Runner-up: (Spain) Guillermo García-López
- Score: 7–5, 6–2

Events
| Singles | men | women |
| Doubles | men | women |
- Aegon International

Dmitry Tursunov was the defending champion, however he chose to not participate this year. Michaël Llodra won in the final 7–5, 6–2 against Guillermo García-López.

== Seeds ==
1. (Spain) Nicolás Almagro (second round, retired injured groin)
2. (Spain) Feliciano López (first round, retired injured shoulder)
3. (France) Gilles Simon (quarterfinals)
4. (France) Julien Benneteau (quarterfinals)
5. (Spain) Guillermo García-López (final)
6. (Argentina) Horacio Zeballos (second round)
7. (Ukraine) Alexandr Dolgopolov (semifinals)
8. (France) Michaël Llodra (champion)

== Draw ==
Key

- Q = Qualifier
- WC = Wild card
- LL = Lucky loser
- Alt = Alternate
- ITF = ITF entry
- PR = Protected ranking
- SR = Special ranking
- SE = Special exempt
- JE = Junior exempt
- JR = Junior Accelerator Programme entrant
- CO = College Accelerator Programme entrant
- NG = Next Gen Accelerator Program entrant
- w/o = Walkover
- r = Retired
- d = Defaulted

=== Finals ===
Semifinals
(Uzbekistan) Denis Istomin | 6 | 3 | 4
5 | (Spain) Guillermo García-López | 3 | 6 | 6
8 | (France) Michaël Llodra | 6 | 7
7 | (Ukraine) Alexandr Dolgopolov | 3 | 5

Final
5 | (Spain) Guillermo García-López | 5 | 2
8 | (France) Michaël Llodra | 7 | 6

=== Top half ===
First round
1 | (Spain) N Almagro | 7 | 7
(Poland) Ł Kubot | 5 | 6^{3}
(Argentina) E Schwank | 0 | 3
(Uzbekistan) D Istomin | 6 | 6
(Ukraine) I Marchenko | 6 | 6
(Italy) A Seppi | 4 | 4
(Slovakia) L Lacko | 4 | 6 | 5
6 | (Argentina) H Zeballos | 6 | 4 | 7
4 | (France) J Benneteau | 7 | 7
(United States) J Blake | 6^{3} | 5
(South Africa) K Anderson | 7 | 3 | r
(Israel) D Sela | 5 | 6
Q | (Ecuador) G Lapentti | 6^{11} | 7 | 3
(Italy) F Fognini | 7 | 6^{3} | 6
(France) M Gicquel | 4 | 7 | 6^{3}
5 | (Spain) G García-López | 6 | 6^{4} | 7

Second round
1 | (Spain) N Almagro | 4 | 0 | r
(Uzbekistan) D Istomin | 6 | 1
(Ukraine) I Marchenko | 7 | 6
6 | (Argentina) H Zeballos | 6^{2} | 3
4 | (France) J Benneteau | 7 | 7
(Israel) D Sela | 6^{8} | 5
(Italy) F Fognini | 2 | 2
5 | (Spain) G García-López | 6 | 6

Quarterfinals
(Uzbekistan) D Istomin | 6 | 6
(Ukraine) I Marchenko | 1 | 4
4 | (France) J Benneteau | 6 | 3 | 6^{2}
5 | (Spain) G García-López | 4 | 6 | 7

Semifinals
(Uzbekistan) D Istomin | 6 | 3 | 4
5 | (Spain) G García-López | 3 | 6 | 6

=== Bottom half ===
First round
8 | (France) M Llodra | 6 | 6
Q | (Germany) M Emmrich | 0 | 3
(France) S Robert | 7 | 6
(Argentina) L Mayer | 6^{4} | 4
Q | (Russia) A Kuznetsov | 6 | 3
Q | (Japan) K Nishikori | 4 | 1 | r
(Kazakhstan) E Korolev | 3 | 7 | 4
3/WC | (France) G Simon | 6 | 6^{6} | 6
7 | (Ukraine) A Dolgopolov | 6 | 3 | 6
WC | (United Kingdom) J Baker | 4 | 6 | 1
(Chinese Taipei) Y-h Lu | 6 | 6
(Slovakia) K Beck | 4 | 4
(Germany) R Schüttler | 6 | 6
(Kazakhstan) A Golubev | 2 | 3
WC | (United Kingdom) J Ward | 6 | 5
2 | (Spain) F López | 3 | 4 | r

Second round
8 | (France) M Llodra | 6 | 6^{2} | 6
(France) S Robert | 1 | 7 | 4
Q | (Russia) A Kuznetsov | 1 | 7 | 6^{2}
3/WC | (France) G Simon | 6 | 6^{3} | 7
7 | (Ukraine) A Dolgopolov | 6^{1} | 6 | 6
(Chinese Taipei) Y-h Lu | 7 | 1 | 2
(Germany) R Schüttler | 3 | 6^{5}
WC | (United Kingdom) J Ward | 6 | 7

Quarterfinals
8 | (France) M Llodra | 6 | 6
3/WC | (France) G Simon | 1 | 3
7 | (Ukraine) A Dolgopolov | 6 | 6
WC | (United Kingdom) J Ward | 3 | 4

Semifinals
8 | (France) M Llodra | 6 | 7
7 | (Ukraine) A Dolgopolov | 3 | 5
