= 2009 Aegon International – Men's doubles =

Men's doubles
- 2009 Aegon International

Final
- Champions: (Poland) Mariusz Fyrstenberg (Poland) Marcin Matkowski
- Runners-up: (United States) Travis Parrott (Slovakia) Filip Polášek
- Score: 6–4, 6–4

Events
Singles	men	women
Doubles	men	women
← 2008 ·	Aegon International	· 2010 →

This was the first edition of the men's doubles event at Eastbourne. Mariusz Fyrstenberg and Marcin Matkowski defeated Travis Parrott and Filip Polášek 6–4, 6-4

== Seeds ==
1. (Czech Republic) Lukáš Dlouhý / (India) Leander Paes (first round)
2. (India) Mahesh Bhupathi / (The Bahamas) Mark Knowles (second round)
3. (Brazil) Bruno Soares / (Zimbabwe) Kevin Ullyett (semifinals)
4. (Belarus) Max Mirnyi / (Israel) Andy Ram (second round)

== Draw ==
=== Key ===
- Q = Qualifier
- WC = Wild card
- LL = Lucky loser
- Alt = Alternate
- SE = Special exempt
- PR = Protected ranking
- ITF = ITF entry
- JE = Junior exempt
- w/o = Walkover
- r = Retired
- d = Defaulted
- SR = Special ranking

=== Draw ===
First round
1	(Czech Republic) L Dlouhý (India) L Paes	1	6^{3}
(Poland) M Fyrstenberg (Poland) M Matkowski	6	7
(Argentina) L Arnold Ker (Germany) M Kohlmann	6	3	[10]
(Italy) A Seppi (Croatia) L Zovko	4	6	[6]
3	(Brazil) B Soares (Zimbabwe) K Ullyett	4	7	[10]
WC	(Israel) J Erlich (United Kingdom) J Murray	6	6^{6}	[7]
WC	(United Kingdom) C Fleming (United Kingdom) K Skupski	6	4	[10]
(Brazil) M Melo (Brazil) A Sá	4	6	[8]
(France) J Benneteau (France) F Santoro	2	1
(South Africa) J Coetzee (Australia) J Kerr	6	6
(United States) J Cerretani (Austria) J Knowle	5	3
4	(Belarus) M Mirnyi (Israel) A Ram	7	6
(United States) T Parrott (Slovakia) F Polášek	4	6	[10]
(Russia) T Gabashvili (Russia) D Tursunov	6	3	[4]
(Australia) S Huss (United Kingdom) R Hutchins	6	6^{4}	[3]
2	(India) M Bhupathi (The Bahamas) M Knowles	4	7	[10]

Quarterfinals
(Poland) M Fyrstenberg (Poland) M Matkowski	6	6
(Argentina) L Arnold Ker (Germany) M Kohlmann	3	4
3	(Brazil) B Soares (Zimbabwe) K Ullyett	6	6^{5}	[10]
WC	(United Kingdom) C Fleming (United Kingdom) K Skupski	3	7	[7]
(South Africa) J Coetzee (Australia) J Kerr	6	6
4	(Belarus) M Mirnyi (Israel) A Ram	3	4
(United States) T Parrott (Slovakia) F Polášek	7	6
2	(India) M Bhupathi (The Bahamas) M Knowles	6^{5}	4

Semifinals
(Poland) M Fyrstenberg (Poland) M Matkowski	2	7	[11]
3	(Brazil) B Soares (Zimbabwe) K Ullyett	6	6^{5}	[9]
(South Africa) J Coetzee (Australia) J Kerr	2	4
(United States) T Parrott (Slovakia) F Polášek	6	6

Final
(Poland) M Fyrstenberg (Poland) M Matkowski	6	6
(United States) T Parrott (Slovakia) F Polášek	4	4
