= 2009 Aegon International – Women's singles =

Women's singles
- 2009 Aegon International

Final
- Champion: (Denmark) Caroline Wozniacki
- Runner-up: (France) Virginie Razzano
- Score: 7–6^{(7–5)}, 7–5

Details
- Draw: 32
- Seeds: 8

Events
Singles	men	women
Doubles	men	women
- Aegon International

Agnieszka Radwańska was the defending champion, but lost in the quarterfinals to Virginie Razzano.

Caroline Wozniacki won the title, defeating Razzano in the final 7–6^{(7–5)}, 7–5.

== Seeds ==
1. (Russia) Elena Dementieva (second round)
2. (Russia) Svetlana Kuznetsova (first round)
3. (Serbia) Jelena Janković (first round)
4. (Russia) Vera Zvonareva (first round)
5. (Belarus) Victoria Azarenka (withdrew due to a hip injury)
6. (Denmark) Caroline Wozniacki (champion)
7. (Russia) Nadia Petrova (second round, retired due to right low back injury)
8. (Poland) Agnieszka Radwańska (quarterfinals)

== Draw ==
Key

- Q = Qualifier
- WC = Wild card
- LL = Lucky loser
- Alt = Alternate
- ITF = ITF entry
- PR = Protected ranking
- SR = Special ranking
- SE = Special exempt
- JE = Junior exempt
- JR = Junior Accelerator Programme entrant
- CO = College Accelerator Programme entrant
- NG = Next Gen Accelerator Program entrant
- w/o = Walkover
- r = Retired
- d = Defaulted

=== Finals ===
Semifinals
(France) Virginie Razzano	6	1
(France) Marion Bartoli	4	0^{r}
6	(Denmark) Caroline Wozniacki	3	6	6
(Canada) Aleksandra Wozniak	6	4	4

Final
(France) Virginie Razzano	6^{5}	5
6	(Denmark) Caroline Wozniacki	7^{7}	7

=== Top half ===
First round
1	(Russia) E Dementieva	6	6
(Russia) M Kirilenko	2	2
(France) A Cornet	6^{3}	2
(France) V Razzano	7^{7}	6
WC	(United Kingdom) E Baltacha	2	5
(China) N Li	6	7
Q	(Poland) U Radwańska	1	1
8	(Poland) A Radwańska	6	6
3	(Serbia) J Janković	7^{7}	3	2
(Russia) A Chakvetadze	6^{5}	6	6
(Argentina) G Dulko	3	1
(France) M Bartoli	6	6
(Austria) S Bammer	6	6
WC	(United Kingdom) A Keothavong	3	2
(Spain) A Medina Garrigues	6	6^{4}	6
LL	(Spain) MJ Martínez Sánchez	3	7^{7}	1

Second round
1	(Russia) E Dementieva	0	6	6^{4}
(France) V Razzano	6	3	7^{7}
(China) N Li	1^{r}
8	(Poland) A Radwańska	3
(Russia) A Chakvetadze	5	3
(France) M Bartoli	7	6
(Austria) S Bammer	1	5
(Spain) A Medina Garrigues	6	7

Quarterfinals
(France) V Razzano	7^{7}	7
8	(Poland) A Radwańska	6^{5}	5
(France) M Bartoli	6	6
(Spain) A Medina Garrigues	1	4

Semifinals
(France) V Razzano	6	1
(France) M Bartoli	4	0^{r}

=== Bottom half ===
First round
6	(Denmark) C Wozniacki	6	6
(Russia) A Kleybanova	3	2
(Australia) S Stosur	6	6
(Germany) S Lisicki	2	1
Q	(Slovakia) J Groth	6^{7}	1
Q	(Russia) E Makarova	7^{9}	6
(France) A Mauresmo	6	1	6
4	(Russia) V Zvonareva	3	6	3
7	(Russia) N Petrova	6	4	6
(Serbia) A Ivanovic	1	6	4
(Japan) A Sugiyama	7^{8}	5	4
Q	(Russia) V Dushevina	6^{6}	7	6
(Spain) C Suárez Navarro	2	2
(China) J Zheng	6	6
(Canada) A Wozniak	6	6
2/WC	(Russia) S Kuznetsova	0	3

Second round
6	(Denmark) C Wozniacki	6	5	6
(Australia) S Stosur	1	7	1
Q	(Russia) E Makarova	7^{10}	7^{15}
(France) A Mauresmo	6^{8}	6^{13}
7	(Russia) N Petrova	7	0^{r}
Q	(Russia) V Dushevina	5	1
(China) J Zheng	6^{3}	3
(Canada) A Wozniak	7^{7}	6

Quarterfinals
6	(Denmark) C Wozniacki	6	6
Q	(Russia) E Makarova	3	2
Q	(Russia) V Dushevina	1	0
(Canada) A Wozniak	6	6

Semifinals
6	(Denmark) C Wozniacki	3	6	6
(Canada) A Wozniak	6	4	4
