= Ekaterina Makarova =

Russian tennis player (born 1988)

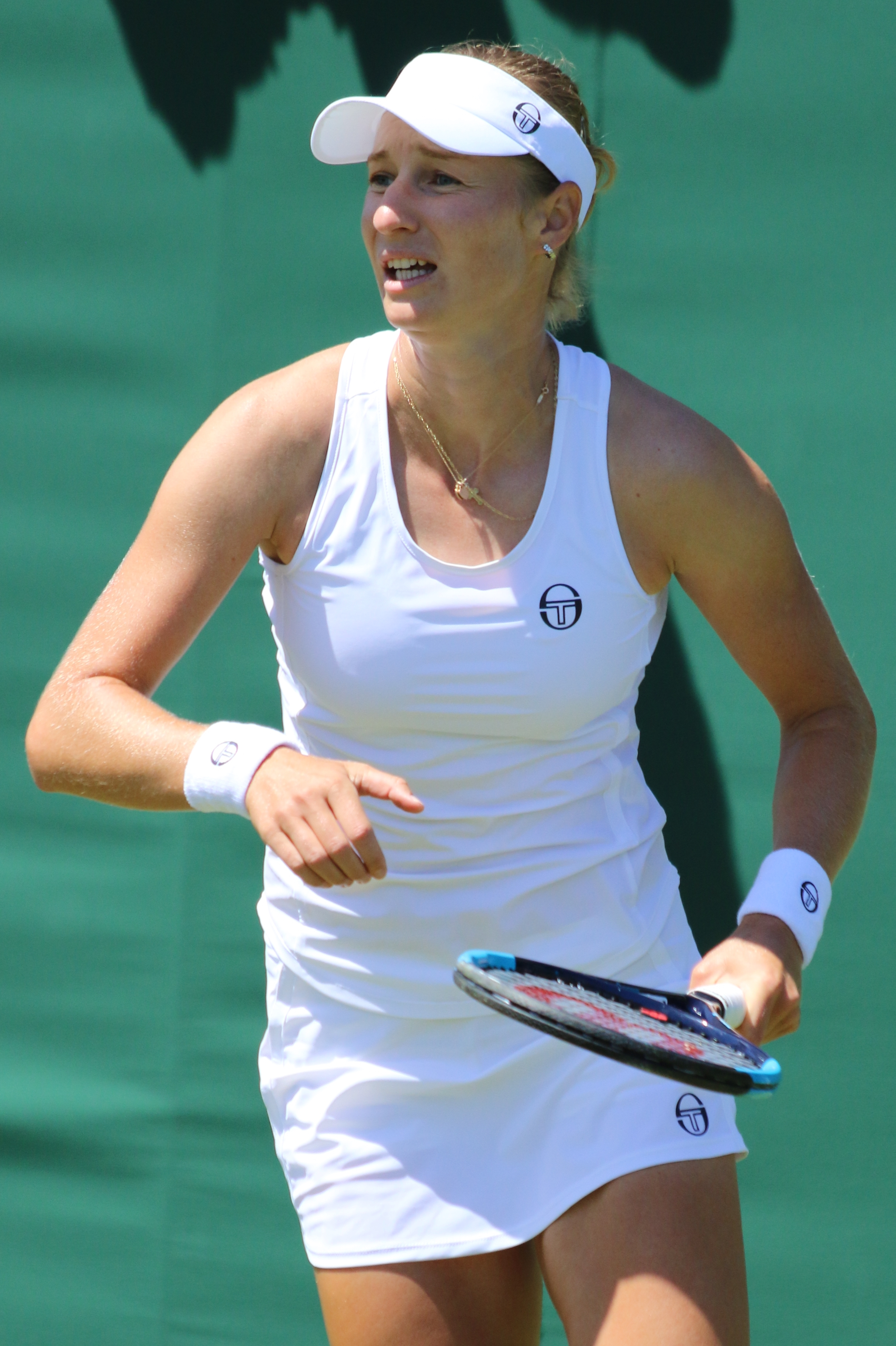
- Makarova at the 2018 Wimbledon Championships
- Native name: Екатерина Макарова
- Country (sports): Russia
- Residence: Moscow, Russia
- Born: 7 June 1988 (age 38) Moscow, Russian SFSR, Soviet Union
- Height: 1.80 m (5 ft 11 in)
- Turned pro: October 2004
- Retired: 28 January 2020
- Plays: Left-handed (two-handed backhand)
- Coach: Evgenia Manyukova (2007–2017); Nigel Sears (2017–2018)
- Prize money: US$ 13,229,362

Singles
- Career record: 436–307
- Career titles: 3
- Highest ranking: No. 8 (6 April 2015)

Grand Slam singles results
- Australian Open: SF (2015)
- French Open: 4R (2011, 2015)
- Wimbledon: QF (2014)
- US Open: SF (2014)

Other tournaments
- Olympic Games: 3R (2016)

Doubles
- Career record: 376–180
- Career titles: 15
- Highest ranking: No. 1 (11 June 2018)

Grand Slam doubles results
- Australian Open: F (2014, 2018)
- French Open: W (2013)
- Wimbledon: W (2017)
- US Open: W (2014)

Other doubles tournaments
- Tour Finals: W (2016)
- Olympic Games: W (2016)

Grand Slam mixed doubles results
- Australian Open: F (2010)
- French Open: QF (2011)
- Wimbledon: QF (2018)
- US Open: W (2012)

Team competitions
- Fed Cup: W (2008)
Medal record
Women's tennis
Representing Russia
Olympic Games
Gold medal – first place	2016 Rio de Janeiro	Doubles
Summer Universiade
Gold medal – first place	2013 Kazan	Doubles
Gold medal – first place	2009 Belgrade	Doubles
Gold medal – first place	2009 Belgrade	Team

Ekaterina Valeryevna Makarova (Russian: Екатери́на Вале́рьевна Мака́рова; Russian pronunciation: [jɪkətʲɪˈrʲinə mɐˈkarəvə]; born 7 June 1988) is a Russian former professional tennis player who was ranked world No. 1 in doubles, and world No. 8 in singles.

She is a four-time Grand Slam champion, having won the 2013 French Open, 2014 US Open and 2017 Wimbledon Championships in women's doubles, all alongside compatriot Elena Vesnina, as well as the 2012 US Open in mixed doubles with Bruno Soares. Makarova and Vesnina also finished runners-up at the 2014 and 2018 Australian Opens, 2015 Wimbledon Championships and 2016 French Open. She and Jaroslav Levinský reached the mixed doubles final at the 2010 Australian Open. In singles, Makarova achieved her best Grand Slam results at the 2014 US Open and 2015 Australian Open, where she reached the semifinals.

She became world No. 1 in doubles on 11 June 2018, and won 15 titles on the WTA Tour, including the 2016 WTA Finals and seven at Premier Mandatory/Premier 5 level. Makarova and Vesnina also won Olympic gold in 2016. She reached her career-high singles ranking of world No. 8 on 6 April 2015, and won three WTA titles, most notably at the 2010 Eastbourne International. Makarova was also part of the Russian team which won the 2008 Fed Cup.

== Early life ==
Ekaterina Valeryevna Makarova was born to Valery and Olga in Moscow, Soviet Union. Her father is a banker and her mother a housewife. At age five or six she was sent by her parents to the Luzhniki per the recommendation of friends.

== Career ==
=== 2003–2005 ===
In her first professional tournament in Elektrostal as a wildcard, she reached the quarterfinals losing to Olga Savchuk. At her last tournament of 2003 in Zhukovsky, Russia, she lost in the first round. She then played in Cairo, Egypt, reaching the second round as a qualifier. At Antalya, Turkey, she won her career first title over Kateryna Avdiyenko. Appearing at Felixstowe, Great Britain, she lost in the first round. At Târgu Mureş, Romania, Makarova claimed her second $10k title without dropping a set, defeating Simona Matei in the finals. In Moscow as a wildcard in the qualifier, she earned her first top 100 victory over Tatiana Perebiynis and Marta Domachowska, but lost to compatriot Anna Chakvetadze.

At Redbridge, Makarova lost to Baltacha in the semifinals. In the next tournament at St. Petersburg, she again reached semifinals, in which she lost to compatriot Ekaterina Bychkova. Bychkova beat her in the semifinal at the tournament in Cagnes-sur-Mer, France. In the second round of qualifying for the US Open she lost to Indian Shikha Uberoi. In her next tournaments, she was often reaching first rounds or losing in qualifying.

=== 2006–2007 ===
Her first tournament in 2006 was at Ortesei, in which as a qualifier she lost to Eva Birnerová in the first round. At Torrent, Spain, she reached the final, eventually losing to Romina Oprandi. At an ITF event in Moscow, she reached the final defeating Vesna Manasieva in the quarterfinals and Anna Lapushchenkova in the semifinals, before falling to Evgeniya Rodina.

Makarova began 2007 season losing to Olga Blahotová, at Tampa, Florida. In Moscow, she won the title with victories over Evgenia Grenbenyuk, and Evgeniya Rodina in the final. Makarova entered the qualifying draw for the French Open defeating Erika Takao but was defeated again by Raluca Olaru. Then, in Zagreb, she reached the semifinals, before losing to Kyra Nagy. Makarova then lost in qualifying for the Wimbledon Championships to Barbora Záhlavová-Strýcová after defeating Lilia Osterloh. Makarova qualified for her first Grand Slam main draw at the US Open; in the main draw she defeated Julia Schruff and Ai Sugiyama, but lost to reigning world No. 1 and eventual champion, Justine Henin in straight sets. In her last tournament of the year in Minsk, she reached the second round, losing to Ekaterina Dzehalevich.

=== 2008 ===
Makarova began the year by losing in the qualifying round of the Sydney International. She earned her first win over a top 20 at the Australian Open, where she overcame No. 19 Ágnes Szávay. 14th seed Nadia Petrova hindered her way to the fourth round. In the opening season Makarova had a number of second round achievements, such as at the French Open. Makarova suffered consecutive first round losses at Wimbledon, the Slovenia Open, Nordic Light Open and Cincinnati Open. At the US Open she earned her first top-10 win over world No. 9, Anna Chakvetadze, until falling to Li Na.

=== 2009 ===
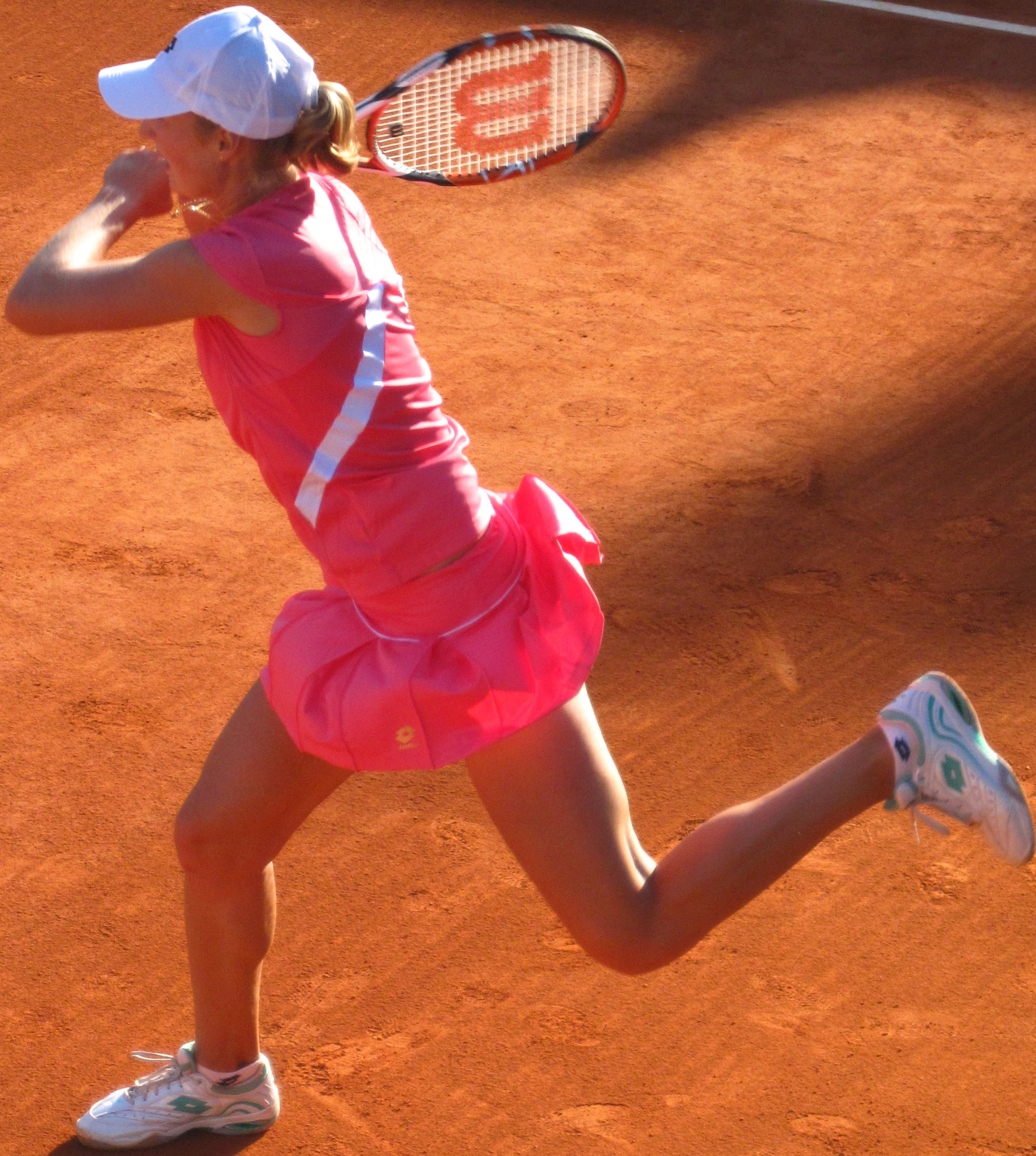
Makarova at the 2009 French Open

Makarova started the 2009 season at Sydney where she lost in the first round to third seed and eventual champion, Elena Dementieva. At the Australian Open, she was defeated in the second round by third seed, compatriot, and eventual finalist Dinara Safina.

At the Open GdF Suez, Makarova lost in the first round to Daniela Hantuchová. In Dubai, she was defeated in the first round by Sania Mirza. At the Indian Wells Open, she lost in the second round to 19th seed Anna Chakvetadze. Competing at the Miami Open, she reached the fourth round where she was defeated by Li Na.

Seeded sixth at the Morocco Open, Makarova reached her first WTA Tour singles final; she lost in a one-sided match to top seed Anabel Medina Garrigues. In doubles, she and Alisa Kleybanova made it to the final where they were defeated by Sorana Cîrstea and Maria Kirilenko. Seeded sixth at the Estoril Open, she made her second singles final where she lost to Yanina Wickmayer. At the French Open, she was defeated in the first round by 18th seed Anabel Medina Garrigues.

Seeded sixth in Birmingham, Makarova lost in the first round to Stefanie Vögele. Getting past qualifying at the Aegon International, she reached the quarterfinals where she was defeated by sixth seed and eventual champion, Caroline Wozniacki. At Wimbledon, she lost in round two to Carla Suárez Navarro. Seeded sixth in Palermo, Makarova was defeated in the second round by Olga Govortsova. Starting her US Open Series at the LA Women's Championships, Makarova lost in the second round to 17th seed Sabine Lisicki. In Cincinnati, she fell in the first round to qualifier Olga Govortsova. At the Rogers Cup, she was defeated in round one by Virginie Razzano. Playing at the Connecticut Open, she lost in the first round to compatriot Anastasia Pavlyuchenkova. At the US Open, she was defeated in her opener by Gisela Dulko.

At the Korea Open, Makarova lost in the first round to eighth seed Sybille Bammer. In Tokyo, she was defeated in round one by 11th seed Agnieszka Radwańska. At the China Open, she made it to the second round where she lost to second seed Serena Williams. In doubles, she and Alla Kudryavtseva reached the final where they were defeated by Hsieh Su-wei/Peng Shuai. Her final tournament of the season was at home in Moscow where she suffered another first-round loss from Lucie Šafářová.

=== 2010: WTA Tour title ===
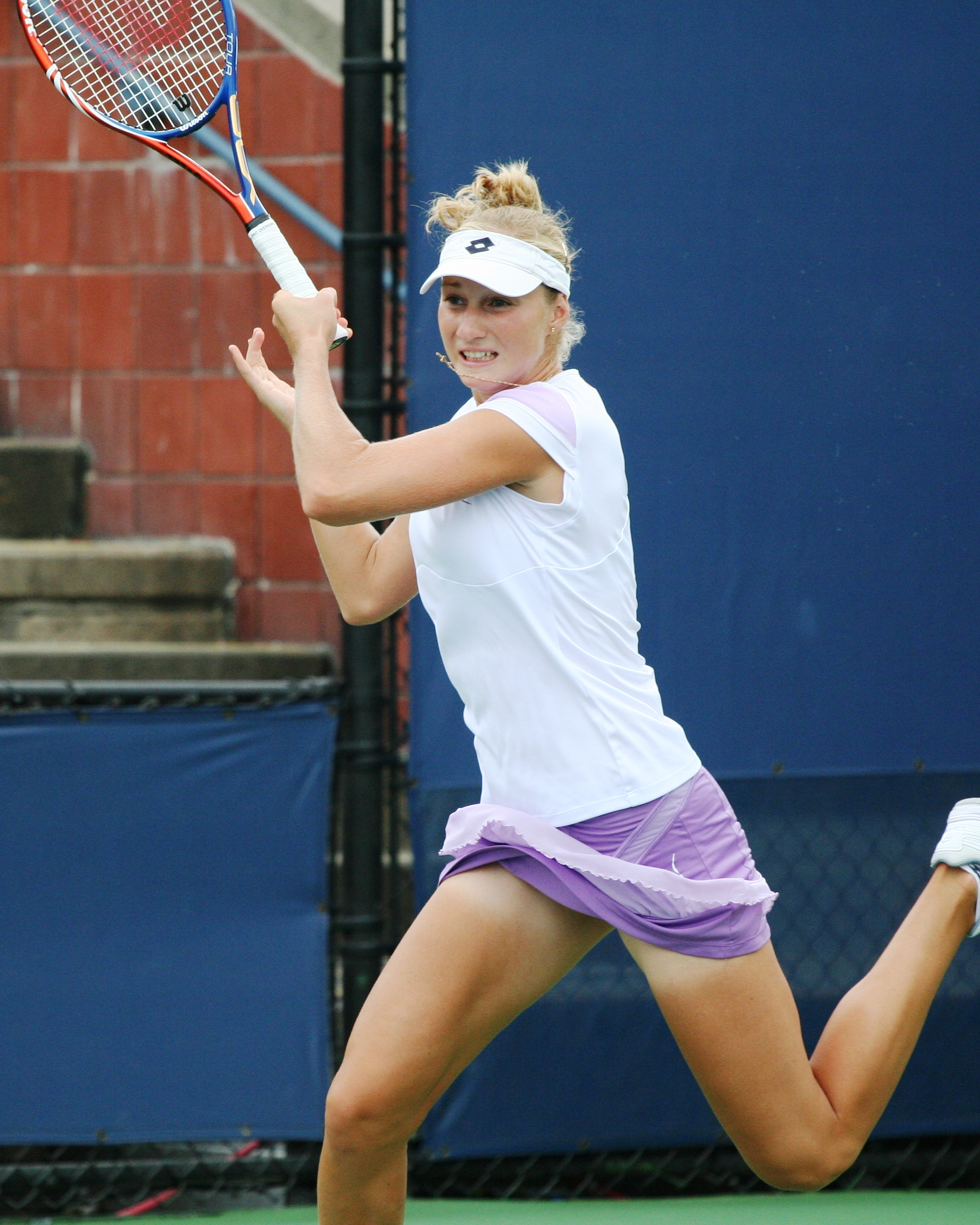
Makarova at the 2010 US Open

Makarova started season at the Brisbane International where she lost in the first round to Alicia Molik. In Hobart, she was defeated in the first round by qualifier Alla Kudryavtseva without winning a single game. At the Australian Open, she lost in the second round to Sara Errani.

At the Eastbourne International, qualifier Makarova made it to the final without dropping a set. She triumphed over Victoria Azarenka in the final to earn her first WTA Tour title. Makarova defeated five top-20 players in the tournament, emerging victorious over No. 11 Flavia Pennetta, No. 13 Nadia Petrova, No. 20 Svetlana Kuznetsova, No. 7 Samantha Stosur, and No. 15 Victoria Azarenka. Makarova then made it to the second round at Wimbledon, but was beaten by second seed Venus Williams. In the US Open, she was defeated by Ana Ivanovic in the first round.

=== 2011 ===
Makarova caused an upset in the first round of the Australian Open when she defeated 19th seed Ana Ivanovic. It took three sets and 2 hours and 47 minutes. She then went on to defeat qualifier Lesia Tsurenko, and caused another upset by beating 13th seed Nadia Petrova. Makarova's career-best run at a Grand Slam tournament was ended in the fourth round by third seed and champion Kim Clijsters. At the Italian Open, Makarova upset defending champion María José Martínez Sánchez in the first round, but lost to eventual champion Maria Sharapova. Makarova would reach the fourth round of the French Open, before losing to fourth seed Victoria Azarenka. She lost her openers at Wimbledon and the US Open to Christina McHale and Maria Kirilenko, respectively.

=== 2012: Breakthrough ===
Makarova started at the Sydney International where she qualified, faced Li Na in the first round and lost. Then at the Australian Open in the second round, she defeated 25th seed Kaia Kanepi. In the third round, she defeated seventh seed Vera Zvonareva. In the round of 16, she defeated 13-time Grand Slam champion Serena Williams to advance to her first Grand Slam quarterfinal of her career. There she faced fourth seed and former champion Maria Sharapova and was defeated by the eventual finalist. Makarova lost in the second round at Indian Wells to Caroline Wozniacki after defeating American Bethanie Mattek-Sands in the opening round. She did well at Miami by reaching the fourth round where she lost to Sharapova again.

Makarova defeated 16th seed Maria Kirilenko at the Madrid Open in the second round, before losing to Lucie Hradecká in the third. At Rome, she defeated Francesca Schiavone before losing to Venus Williams in the second round. At the French Open, she lost her first match against Sloane Stephens.

The following week, she reached the semifinals of the Birmingham Classic, losing to Melanie Oudin. She reached the quarterfinals at Eastbourne but lost to Angelique Kerber. At Wimbledon, she defeated Alberta Brianti in the first round, before she was beaten again by Kerber.

Makarova reached the third round at the Cincinnati Open recording victories over Nadia Petrova and Anna Tatishvili, before losing to Samantha Stosur. At the US Open, Makarova lost to Serena Williams in the third round. She partnered with Brazilian Bruno Soares to win the mixed-doubles competition, defeating Květa Peschke and Marcin Matkowski in three sets in the final. It was her first Grand Slam title of any kind. After that, she reached the semifinals at Seoul where she lost to eventual champion Caroline Wozniacki.

At the China Open, Makarova defeated Kirilenko again in the first round but lost to Polona Hercog next. In the doubles event, she teamed up with Elena Vesnina and won defeating Nuria Llagostera Vives and Sania Mirza in the final. She lost to Dominika Cibulková in the first round at the Kremlin Cup.

=== 2013: Doubles success ===
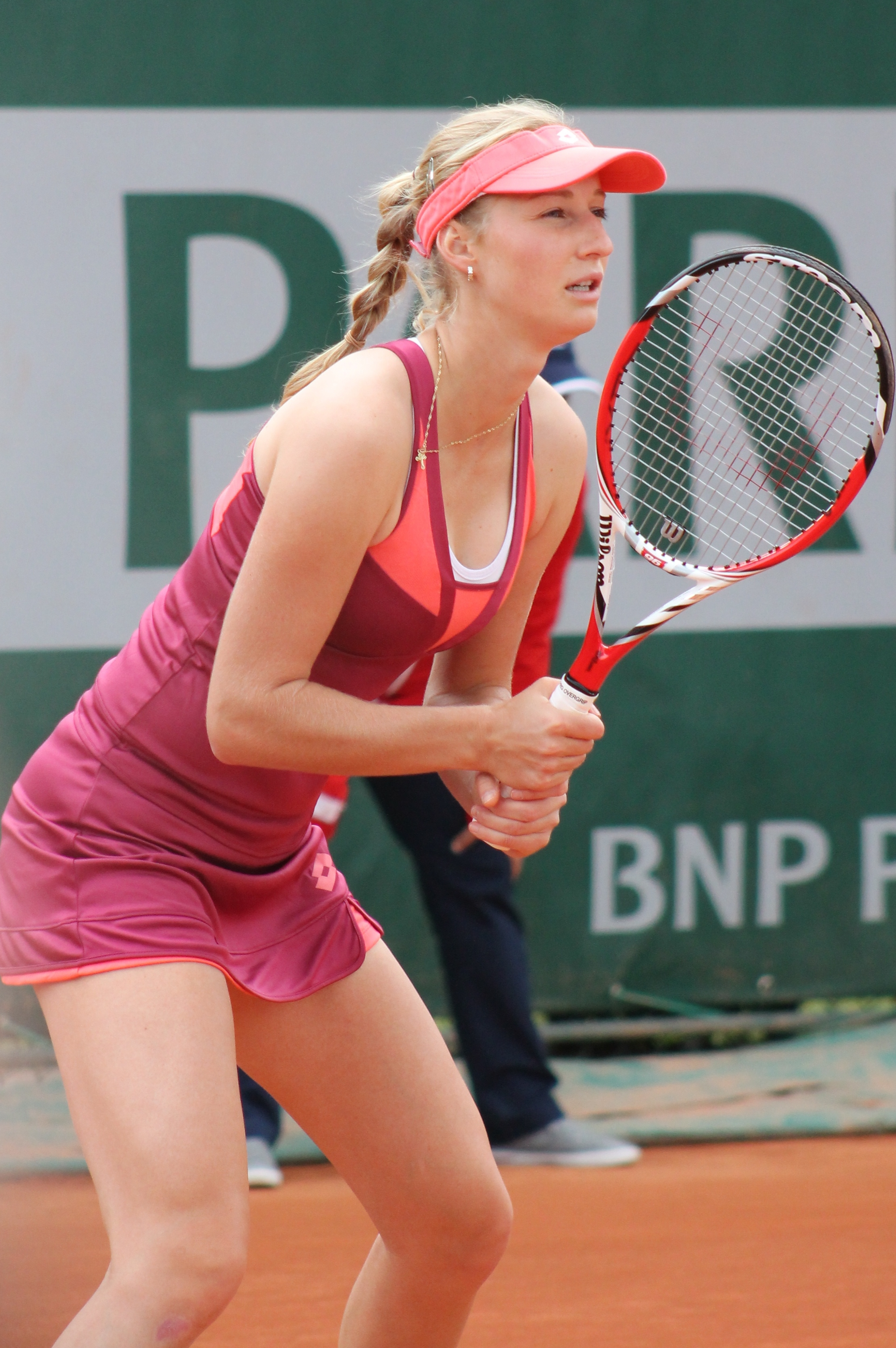
Makarova at the 2013 French Open

At Sydney, she defeated Varvara Lepchenko in the first round before succumbing to Dominika Cibulková. She reached her second consecutive quarterfinal at the Australian Open, recording victories over Marion Bartoli and Angelique Kerber. She then lost to Maria Sharapova again. At Doha, Makarova retired against Petra Kvitová in the second round.

Makarova lost her openers in Indian Wells and Miami receiving first-round byes to Garbiñe Muguruza and Svetlana Kuznetsova, respectively. She partnered Elena Vesnina in the doubles event at Indian Wells and won, defeating Nadia Petrova and Katarina Srebotnik in the final. She fell to Anastasia Pavlyuchenkova in the first round at Porsche Tennis Grand Prix as well. At the Madrid Open, Makarova caused an upset in the second round when she defeated world No. 3, Victoria Azarenka (after winning only one game in the first set), ending the Belarusian's 18-match winning streak to start the season in the process. She had reached the quarterfinals after defeating Marion Bartoli but then lost to seventh seed Sara Errani, in straight sets. At the French Open, she lost her opening match to fellow Russian Svetlana Kuznetsova. She teamed up with Vesnina in doubles, winning the French Open doubles title.

Makarova lost her opener at Birmingham to Marina Erakovic, after having a first-round bye but reached the quarterfinals at Eastbourne where she lost to Wozniacki. At Wimbledon, Makarova reached the third round; she lost to Petra Kvitová in three sets.

During the US Open Series, she reached semifinals at the Washington Open bot lost to eventual champion Magdaléna Rybáriková. She reached the second round at Toronto and Cincinnati, losing to Roberta Vinci and Jelena Janković, respectively. The week before the US Open, she reached the quarterfinals at New Haven, losing to eventual champion Simona Halep. At the US Open, she defeated third seed Agnieszka Radwańska in the fourth round to reach her third career Grand Slam quarterfinal, and first at the US Open. She subsequently lost to fifth seed Li Na in three sets.

=== 2014: Second career singles title and Grand Slam semifinal ===
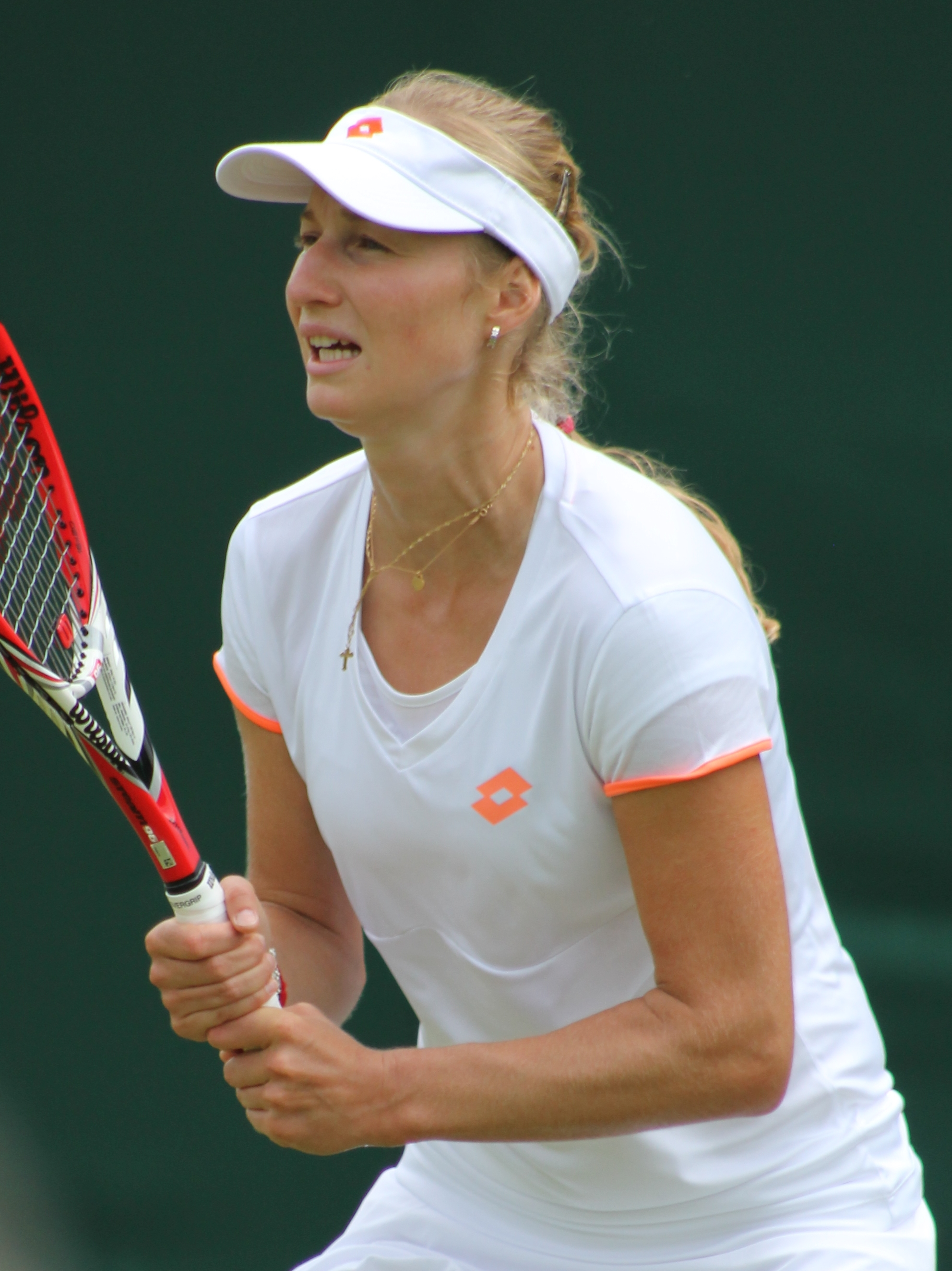
Makarova at the 2014 Wimbledon Championships

Makarova began 2014 at the Sydney International, where she caused an upset by defeating fourth seed Jelena Janković in the first round. She lost to Carla Suárez Navarro in the next round. Then, she reached the fourth round of the Australian Open for the third consecutive time but lost to eventual champion Li Na. In the doubles event, she and Elena Vesnina reached the final, where they lost to Errani and Vinci. Makarova won her second title at the Pattaya Open by defeating Karolína Plíšková. In Dubai, she beat Alisa Kleybanova in the opening round. She then lost to world No. 1, Serena Williams.

She reached the third round at Indian Wells Open where she lost to Dominika Cibulková. In Miami, she defeated Sara Errani in the third round but lost to Angelique Kerber in three sets in the fourth. Makarova lost her openers at Stuttgart and Madrid to Suarez Navarro and Caroline Wozniacki, respectively. In Rome, she defeated Roberta Vinci in the first round but lost to Errani in the following round. Makarova reached the third round at Roland Garros where she lost to Sloane Stephens.

During the grass court swing, Makarova defeated Francesca Schiavone and Anastasia Pavlyuchenkova to book her place in the quarterfinals at the Eastbourne International. She then lost to Angelique Kerber. Makarova's good form continued at Wimbledon, where she reached her fourth Grand Slam quarterfinal by defeating Agnieszka Radwańska in the fourth round. Then, she succumbed to Lucie Šafářová in straight sets.

Makarova reached the semifinals in singles for the first time at a Premier 5 tournament, the Rogers Cup. On the way, she beat her doubles partner Vesnina in the second round and second seed Petra Kvitová. She was stopped by Agnieszka Radwańska in a close match, losing two tiebreaks. In doubles, she and Vesnina were beaten with difficulty in the quarterfinals by Hsieh and Peng.

Makarova reached her first Grand Slam singles semifinal at the US Open. Following a win over Eugenie Bouchard in the fourth round, she defeated Victoria Azarenka in the quarterfinal, but was defeated by top seed Serena Williams; this was the only match in the tournament in which she lost at least one set. However, she and Elena Vesnina won the doubles championship, marking her third Grand Slam doubles title.

In the Asian season, Makarova reached the second and third rounds in Wuhan and Beijing, respectively. As a result, she obtained a new highest ranking of 13.

Her successful season in doubles qualified her for the WTA Championships. She was also an alternate player in singles, but did not participate in the round-robin stages.

=== 2015: Second major semifinal and top 10 debut in singles ===
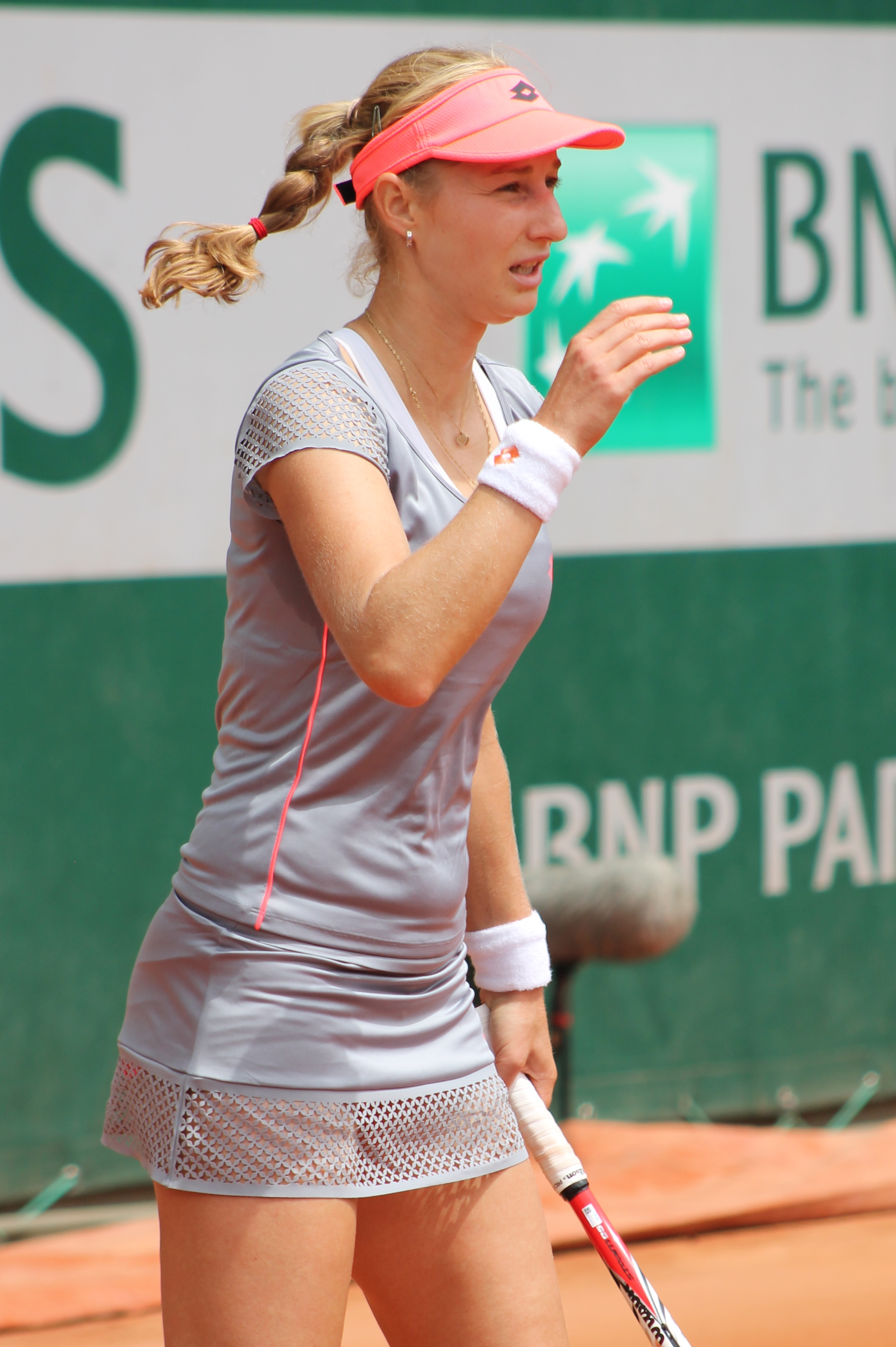
Makarova at the 2015 French Open

In the Pacific season, Makarova first concentrated in singles. Her first appearance was at the Sydney International, where she lost in the second round. At the Australian Open, she reached a Grand Slam semifinal second times in a row, crushing the third-ranked Simona Halep in two sets in the quarterfinal. Her safe streak without a lost set was broken after facing her compatriot Maria Sharapova. In doubles, Makarova and Vesnina made it into the quarterfinals, where they played against future champions Bethanie Mattek-Sands and Lucie Šafářová, and lost in three sets. As a result of her singles success, Makarova reached a new career-high ranking of No. 9.

Sixth-seeded Makarova reached the quarterfinals of the Dubai Championships, where she was defeated by Simona Halep. In doubles, she and Vesnina also reached the quarterfinals. The duo reached two finals in a row at the Indian Wells Open and the Miami Open, but always lost to Sania Mirza and Martina Hingis. In singles, she repeated her last year's result in reaching the third and fourth rounds at these tournaments, respectively.

At the 2015 French Open, Makarova matched her best result at the tournament when she reached the fourth round, as she did in 2011. With a chance to complete her set of having reached at least the quarterfinals at all four majors, she lost to former champion Ivanovic in three sets, and thus failed to reach her first French Open quarterfinal.

Makarova and Vesnina became runners-up at Wimbledon, losing to Hingis and Mirza in three sets, after leading 5–3 in the last set. In singles, Makarova lost to Magdaléna Rybáriková in the second round.

=== 2016: Olympic champion, WTA Finals doubles champion ===
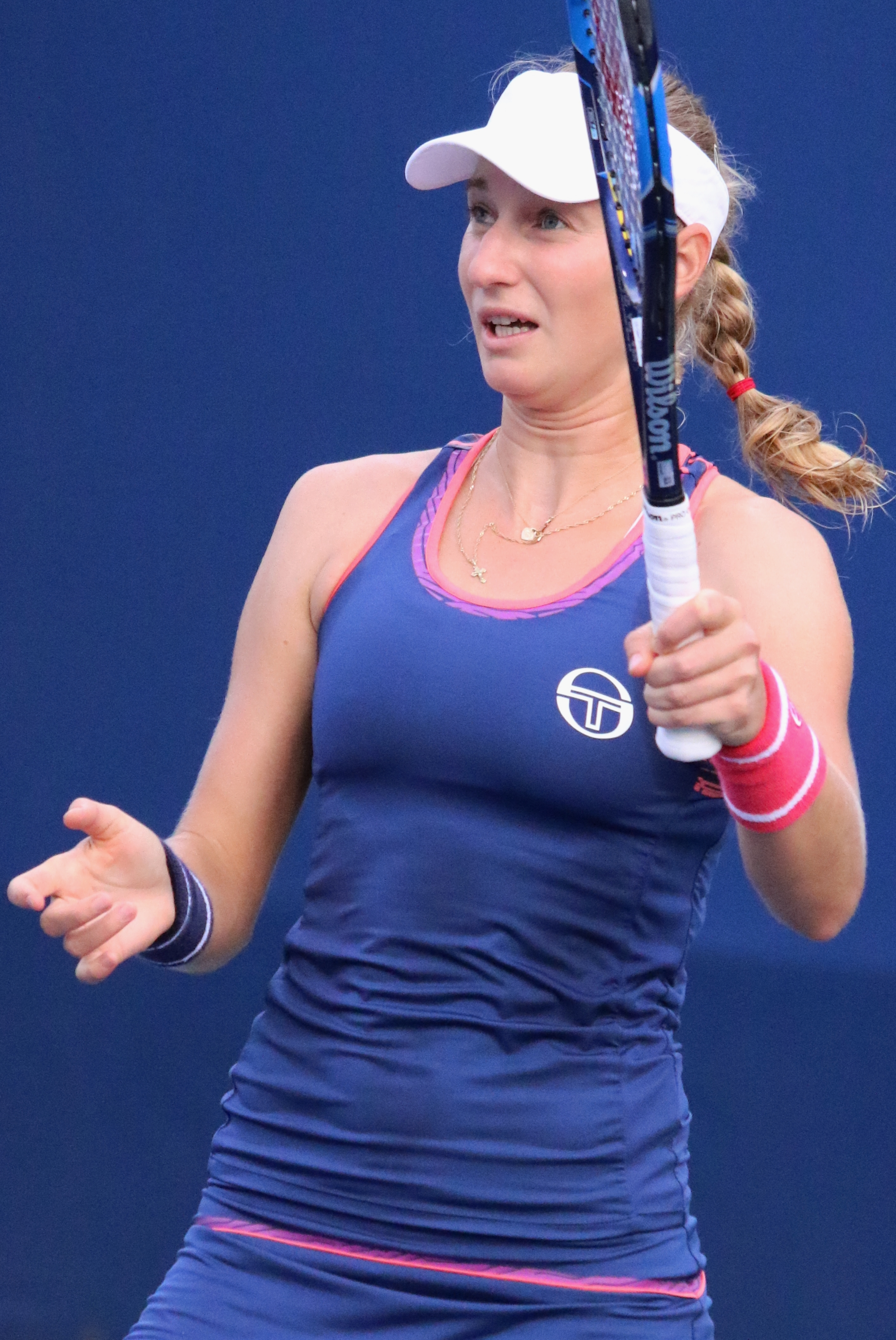
Makarova at the 2016 US Open

In January, Makarova took a break in doubles and started the 2016 season in the Premier tournaments Brisbane and Sydney, reaching the second round and quarterfinals, respectively. In the Australian Open, she reached the fourth round and lost there to Johanna Konta.

Makarova reached the quarterfinals in both singles and doubles at the Miami Open. In doubles, she paired with Barbora Strýcová. She reunited with Vesnina in doubles in Madrid, reaching the semifinals. In the next tournaments, the duo reached two finals in a row; in Rome they lost to Martina Hingis and Sania Mirza, while at the French Open they lost to Caroline Garcia and Kristina Mladenovic. At Wimbledon, the pair lost in the quarterfinals to the Williams sisters. Makarova also progressed in grass court in singles, winning six out of eight matches, only to lose against doubles partner Elena Vesnina in the fourth round.

The duo finally won their first tournament title at the Rogers Cup and won the gold medal at the Summer Olympics for Russia.

Makarova made it to the third round of the Connecticut Open, but lost to Petra Kvitová in the third round. Ekaterina had the worst possible luck at the US Open by drawing the number-one-player in the world, Serena Williams in singles to whom she lost in straight sets. Makarova and Vesnina had a good showing in doubles. They made it to the semifinals, but lost to eventual champions, Mattek-Sands and Šafářová.

Makarova defeated her doubles partner Vesnina in the first round of the China Open. However, she lost to Agnieszka Radwańska in the second round. In doubles, Makarova and Vesnina were stunned in the second round by Peng Shuai and Christina McHale. Her next tournament was the Kremlin Cup. In her home country, she beat qualifier Nicole Gibbs in the first round, but lost to fellow Russian Daria Kasatkina in the second. As the top-seeded alongside Elena Vesnina, they were beaten in the first round by Daria Gavrilova and the same woman she lost to in singles, Daria Kasatkina.

Makarova and Vesnina qualified for their third joint WTA Finals, defeating Hlavacková/Hradecká, Hingis/Mirza, and Mattek-Sands/Šafářová en route to win their first WTA Finals title.

=== 2017: Wimbledon doubles champion, third singles title ===
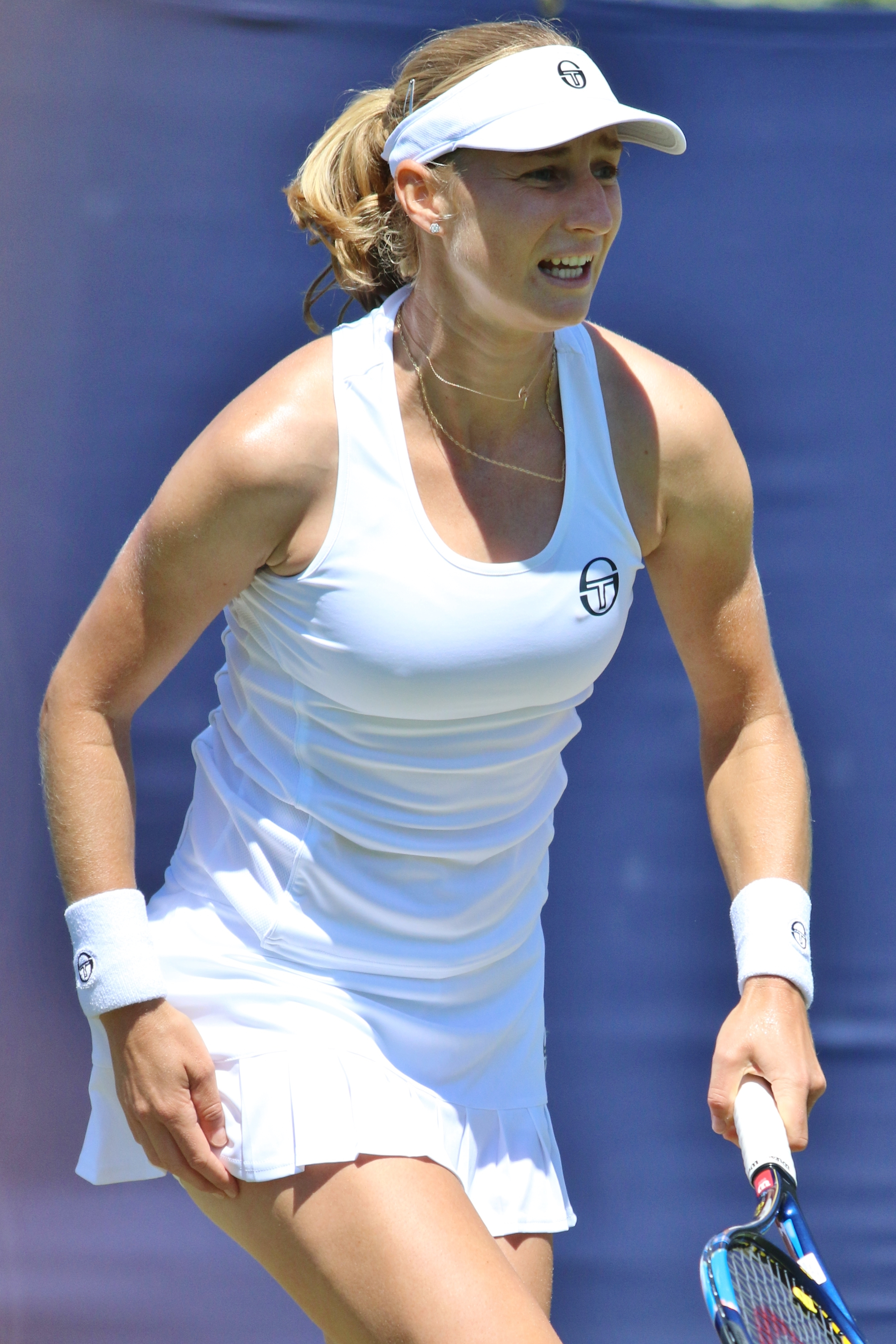
Makarova at the 2017 Eastbourne International

Makarova began her season at the Brisbane International. She lost in the first round to Misaki Doi 6–7, 4–6. However, in doubles, she and Vesnina reached the final, losing the match to Bethanie Mattek-Sands/Sania Mirza in straight sets. In Melbourne, the Russians reached the quarterfinals. At St. Petersburg, she lost in the first round to doubles partner Vesnina. In Dubai, she reached the third round before losing to Lauren Davis. The doubles team, however, won the trophy by defeating Hlaváčková/Peng in three sets. After reaching the semifinals of the Indian Wells Open, the duo had the chance to become the new number-one ranked doubles players if they had won the title, but they only reached the quarterfinals, suffering there an unpredictable loss to Gabriela Dabrowski and Xu Yifan, the eventual champions.

Makarova faced top-ranked Kerber in the first round of the French Open, beating her in two sets; this was the first time in the French Open history and the first time in the Open Era tennis history since 2001 that a number-one ranked player failed to reach the second round. According to WTA Insider, Makarova after her win over Kerber was ranked fourth among active players by number of top-ten wins at Grand Slam tournaments, with 10.

She and Vesnina won their third joint and individual Grand Slam doubles title in Wimbledon, crushing runners-up Chan Hao-ching /Monica Niculescu, 6–0, 6–0. This was the first "double bagel" in the women's doubles tournament final since 1953. The Russian went on winning the Washington Open in singles, beating players as Olympic champion Monica Puig and world No. 2, Simona Halep. In the finals, she prevailed over Julia Görges, winning her third WTA singles title.

Makarova got into the third round of the Rogers Cup, defeating seventh-seeded Johanna Konta en-route but eventually losing to Lucie Šafářová. She again reached third round at the Cincinnati Open, crushing third-seeded Kerber en-route but losing to Sloane Stephens. Makarova thrice in a row defeated a top-10 in the second round of the US Open, fifth-seeded Caroline Wozniacki, for the first time in her career after seven losses in a row against her.

=== 2018: World No. 1 doubles player ===
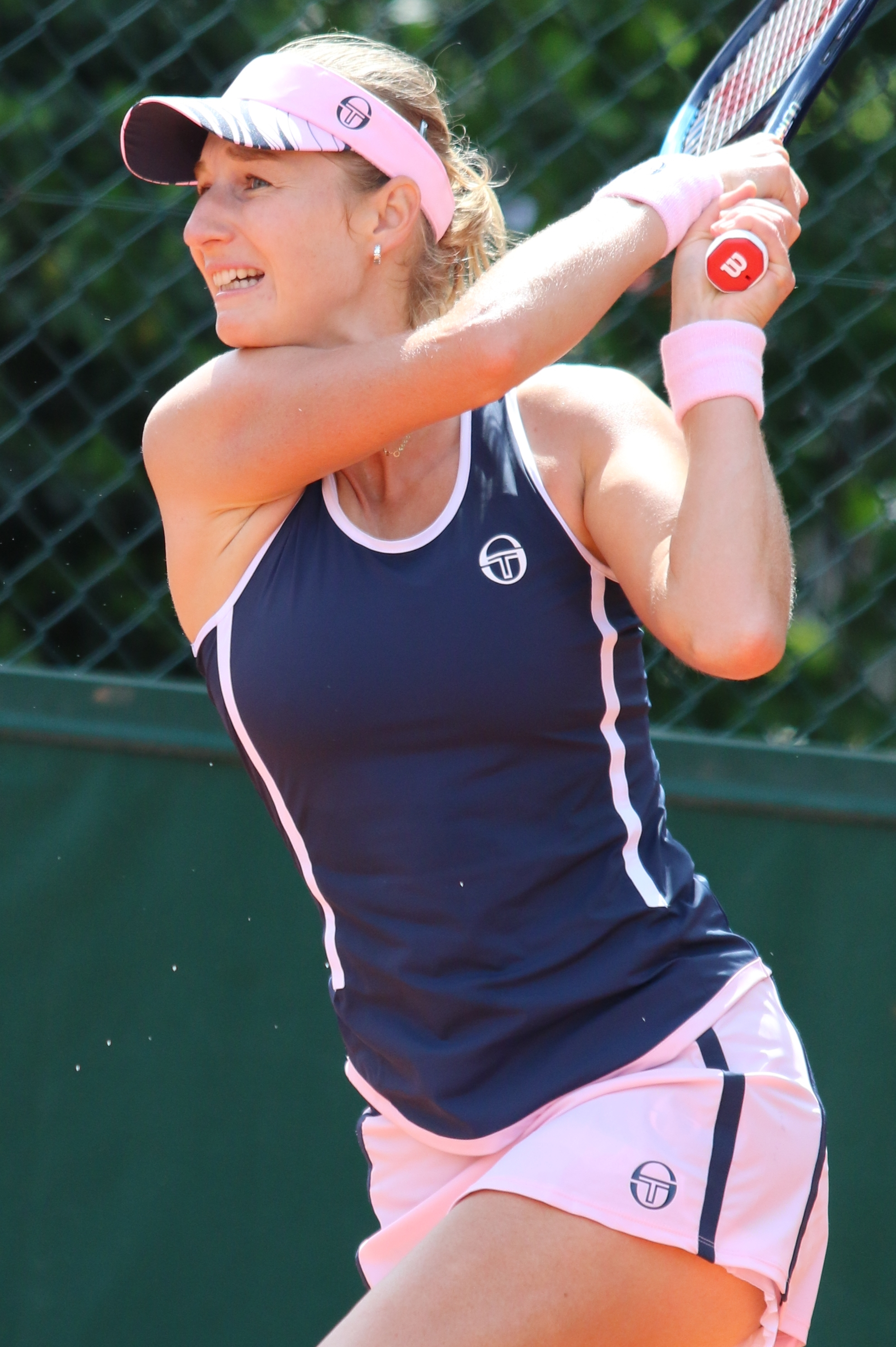
Makarova at the 2018 French Open

Makarova started her 2018 season in January at the Sydney International. She upset third seed Jeļena Ostapenko in the first round. She lost in the second round to Barbora Strýcová. Seeded 31st at the Australian Open, she was defeated in the first round by Irina-Camelia Begu. In doubles, she and Vesnina reached the final where they lost to Tímea Babos/Kristina Mladenovic.

After the Australian Open, Makarova competed at the St. Petersburg Ladies' Trophy. She lost in the second round to Kateřina Siniaková. In Qatar, she was defeated in the second round by second seed and 2014 champion, Simona Halep. At the Dubai Championships, she lost in her second-round match to fifth seed Caroline Garcia. At the Indian Wells Open, she was defeated in the second round by tenth seed Angelique Kerber. In doubles, she and Vesnina made it to the final where they lost to Hsieh Su-Wei/Barbora Strýcová. Playing in Miami, she was defeated in the second round by fifth seed Karolína Plíšková.

Seeded fifth at the İstanbul Cup, Makarova lost in the first round to Aleksandra Krunić. At the Madrid Open, she was defeated in the first round by top seed and two-time defending champion, Simona Halep. However, in doubles, she and Vesnina won the title beating Tímea Babos/Kristina Mladenovic in the final. She lost in the second round of the French Open to 26th seed Barbora Strýcová. Following the French Open, she and Vesnina became the new world No. 1, even though both did not get beyond the first round there (both played with other partners).

In Birmingham, Makarova was defeated in the first round by Alizé Cornet. At the Eastbourne International, she lost in the first round to 2016 champion Dominika Cibulková. At Wimbledon, she stunned second seed Caroline Wozniacki in the second round but was defeated in the fourth round by Camila Giorgi.

Seeded fourth and last year champion at Washington, Makarova lost in the first round to Ana Bogdan. In Montreal, she was defeated in the first round by Anett Kontaveit. In doubles, she and Latisha Chan reached the final where they lost to Ashleigh Barty/Demi Schuurs. At the Cincinnati Open, she made it to the third round where she was defeated by Lesia Tsurenko. In doubles, she and Lucie Hradecká won the title beating Elise Mertens/Demi Schuurs in the final. Competing in one more tournament before the final major of the year, she reached the quarterfinals at the Connecticut Open and lost to fifth seed Julia Görges. At the US Open, she was defeated in the third round by 19th seed Anastasija Sevastova.

Playing in Wuhan, Makarova lost in the first round of qualifying to Lizette Cabrera. At the China Open, she was defeated in the first round by 14th seed and 2015 champion, Garbiñe Muguruza. She played her final tournament of the season at the Kremlin Cup. She lost in the first round to qualifier and eventual finalist, Ons Jabeur.

Makarova ended the year ranked 59 in singles and 6 in doubles.

=== 2019 ===
Makarova began her 2019 season at the Australian Open. She lost in the first round to Katie Boulter. This match was the first match decided by a 10-point final set tie-break at the Australian Open.

At St. Petersburg, Makarova was defeated in the first round by Vera Zvonareva. In doubles, she and Margarita Gasparyan won the title beating Anna Kalinskaya/Viktória Kužmová in the final. In Dubai, she lost in the first round to Aliaksandra Sasnovich. In doubles, she and Lucie Hradecká reached the final where they were defeated by Hsieh Su-wei/Barbora Strýcová.

=== 2020 ===
On 28 January 2020, Makarova announced her retirement from professional tennis.

== Playing style ==
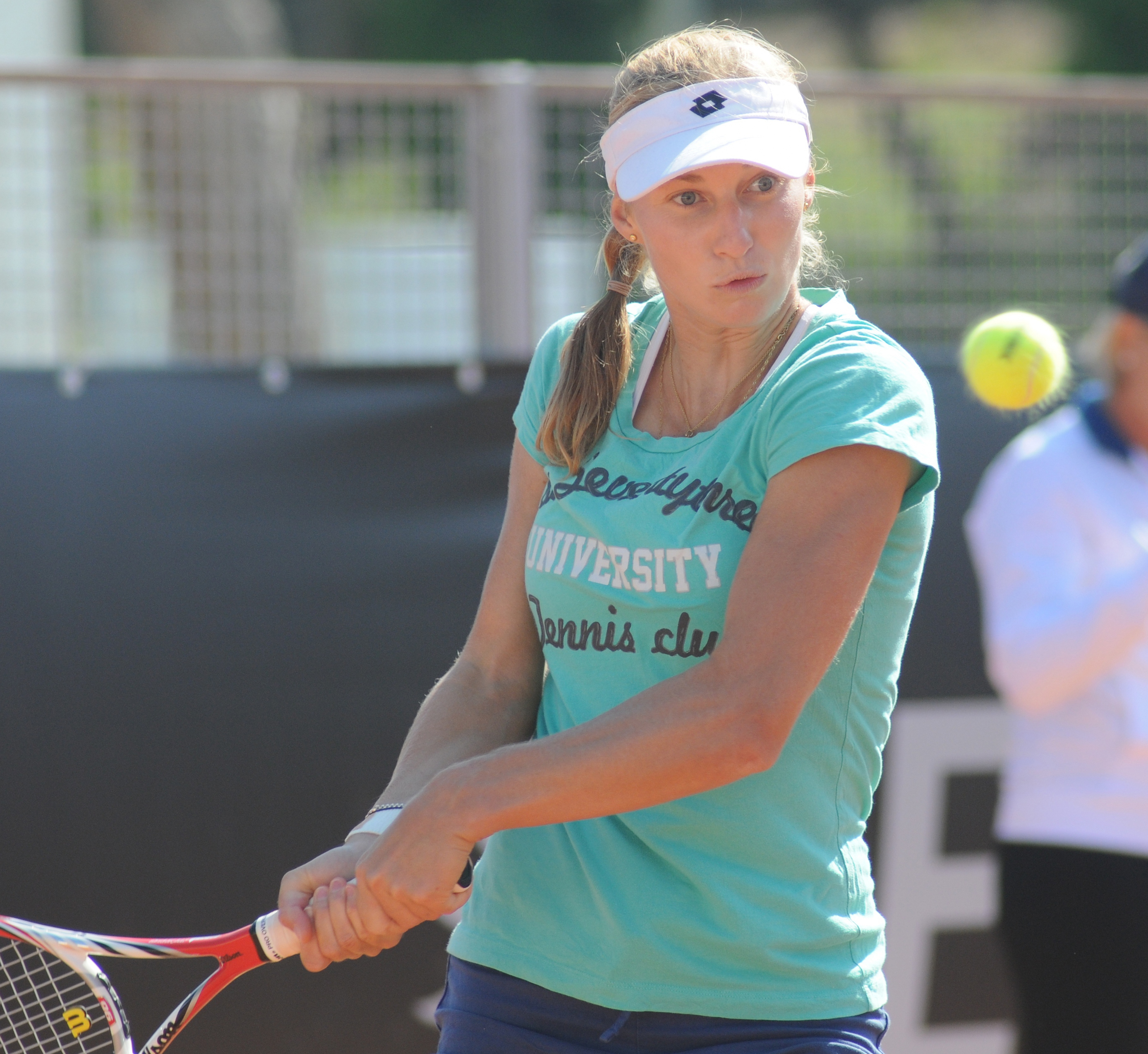
Makarova practicing at Rome, 2014

Makarova was an all-court player who uses power and angles to set up passing shots.

She was noted for her left-handed slice serve, often used to stretch opponents into uncomfortable positions. She attacked the return by shifting her wrist to disguise the direction of her forehand, or by hitting deep and aggressively with her backhand. She will usually seek to end the rally by maneuvering an opponent around the court and hitting a winner near the sidelines. Makarova hit powerfully on both wings, and is largely known for her aggressive groundstrokes. Journalists have noted her cross-court forehand, describing it as a powerful finishing shot. In an article from WTATennis.com, her backhand was labeled "devastatingly good". Similarly, Richard Pagliaro of Tennis.com has noted her "bold" backhand as a primary strength.

Being a left-handed player, she was particularly comfortable hitting backhands in the deuce court, with several of her winners coming from that side. During the 2014 Rogers Cup, Agnieszka Radwańska repeatedly targeted Makarova's forehand in the ad court, occasionally exposing it as a vulnerability. When returning first serves, Makarova often made a series of quick stomps in place before blocking the shot back across the net; she attacks second serves by moving inside the baseline and hitting the ball at an angle.

As of August 2017, Makarova was one of just two left-handed players (the other being Angelique Kerber) to have ever beaten Serena Williams in a Grand Slam match, doing so at the 2012 Australian Open.

== Career statistics ==
=== Performance timelines ===
Key
W	F	SF	QF	#R	RR	Q#	P#	DNQ	A	Z#	PO	G	S	B	NMS	NTI	P	NH

(W) winner; (F) finalist; (SF) semifinalist; (QF) quarterfinalist; (#R) rounds 4, 3, 2, 1; (RR) round-robin stage; (Q#) qualification round; (P#) preliminary round; (DNQ) did not qualify; (A) absent; (Z#) Davis/Fed Cup Zonal Group (with number indication) or (PO) play-off; (G) gold, (S) silver or (B) bronze Olympic/Paralympic medal; (NMS) not a Masters tournament; (NTI) not a Tier I tournament; (P) postponed; (NH) not held; (SR) strike rate (events won / competed); (W–L) win–loss record.

Only main-draw results in WTA Tour, Grand Slam tournaments, Fed Cup and Olympic Games are included in win–loss records.

==== Singles ====
Tournament	2005	2006	2007	2008	2009	2010	2011	2012	2013	2014	2015	2016	2017	2018	2019	SR	W–L
Grand Slam tournaments
Australian Open	A	A	A	3R	2R	2R	4R	QF	QF	4R	SF	4R	4R	1R	1R	0 / 12	29–12
French Open	A	A	Q2	2R	1R	1R	4R	1R	1R	3R	4R	2R	2R	2R	A	0 / 11	12–11
Wimbledon	A	A	Q3	1R	2R	2R	1R	2R	3R	QF	2R	4R	2R	4R	A	0 / 11	17–11
US Open	Q2	A	3R	3R	1R	1R	1R	3R	QF	SF	4R	1R	3R	3R	A	0 / 12	22–12
Win–loss	0–0	0–0	2–1	5–4	2–4	2–4	6–4	7–4	10–4	14–4	12–4	7–4	7–4	6–4	0–1	0 / 46	80–46

==== Doubles ====
Tournament	2007	2008	2009	2010	2011	2012	2013	2014	2015	2016	2017	2018	2019	SR	W–L
Grand Slam tournaments
Australian Open	A	A	2R	2R	1R	QF	SF	F	QF	A	QF	F	2R	0 / 10	26–10
French Open	A	2R	2R	2R	1R	QF	W	2R	SF	F	QF	1R	A	1 / 11	25–10
Wimbledon	A	QF	QF	2R	3R	QF	3R	3R	F	QF	W	2R	A	1 / 11	31–10
US Open	A	2R	SF	2R	3R	3R	QF	W	A	SF	3R	QF		1 / 10	28–9
Win–loss	0–0	5–3	9–4	4–4	3–4	11–4	15–3	14–3	12–3	12–3	14–3	9–4	1–1	3 / 42	110–39
Olympic Games
Summer Olympics	NH	A	Not Held			QF	Not Held			G	NH			1 / 2	7–1
Year-end championships
WTA Finals	Did not qualify						F	QF	A	W	SF	A		1 / 4	5–3
Career statistics
Titles	0	0	1	0	0	2	2	1	0	3	3	2	1	15	
Overall Win–loss	0–2	14–11	27–18	7–17	13–14	35–13	30–11	24–14	26–10	34–10	38–12	37–12	8–2	369–176	
Year-end ranking	151	62	20	72	57	11	7	7	10	8	3	6		No. 1	

=== Grand Slam tournament finals ===
==== Doubles: 7 (3 titles, 4 runner-ups) ====
Result	Year	Championship	Surface	Partner	Opponents	Score
Win	2013	French Open	Clay	(Russia) Elena Vesnina	(Italy) Sara Errani (Italy) Roberta Vinci	7–5, 6–2
Loss	2014	Australian Open	Hard	(Russia) Elena Vesnina	(Italy) Sara Errani (Italy) Roberta Vinci	4–6, 6–3, 5–7
Win	2014	US Open	Hard	(Russia) Elena Vesnina	(Switzerland) Martina Hingis (Italy) Flavia Pennetta	2–6, 6–3, 6–2
Loss	2015	Wimbledon	Grass	(Russia) Elena Vesnina	(Switzerland) Martina Hingis (India) Sania Mirza	7–5, 6–7^{(4–7)}, 5–7
Loss	2016	French Open	Clay	(Russia) Elena Vesnina	(France) Caroline Garcia (France) Kristina Mladenovic	3–6, 6–2, 4–6
Win	2017	Wimbledon	Grass	(Russia) Elena Vesnina	(Chinese Taipei) Chan Hao-ching (Romania) Monica Niculescu	6–0, 6–0
Loss	2018	Australian Open	Hard	(Russia) Elena Vesnina	(Hungary) Tímea Babos (France) Kristina Mladenovic	4–6, 3–6

==== Mixed doubles: 2 (1 title, 1 runner-up) ====
Result	Year	Championship	Surface	Partner	Opponents	Score
Loss	2010	Australian Open	Hard	(Czech Republic) Jaroslav Levinský	(Zimbabwe) Cara Black (India) Leander Paes	5–7, 3–6
Win	2012	US Open	Hard	(Brazil) Bruno Soares	(Czech Republic) Květa Peschke (Poland) Marcin Matkowski	6–7^{(8–10)}, 6–1, [12–10]

=== WTA Tour Championships finals ===
==== Doubles: 2 (1 title, 1 runner-up) ====
Result	Year	Tournament	Surface	Partner	Opponents	Score
Loss	2013	WTA Championships, Istanbul	Hard (i)	(Russia) Elena Vesnina	(Chinese Taipei) Hsieh Su-wei (China) Peng Shuai	4–6, 5–7
Win	2016	WTA Finals, Singapore	Hard (i)	(Russia) Elena Vesnina	(United States) Bethanie Mattek-Sands (Czech Republic) Lucie Šafářová	7–6^{(7–5)}, 6–3

=== Olympic finals ===
==== Doubles: 1 (gold medal) ====
Result	Year	Tournament	Surface	Partner	Opponents	Score
Gold	2016	Rio Summer Olympics	Hard	(Russia) Elena Vesnina	(Switzerland) Timea Bacsinszky (Switzerland) Martina Hingis	6–4, 6–4

== Awards ==
2005

- The Russian Cup in the nomination Girls Under-18 Team of the Year

2008

- The Russian Cup in the nomination Team of the Year

2009

- The Russian Cup in the nomination Team of the Year

2012

- The Russian Cup in the nomination Female Players of the Year

2013

- The Russian Cup in the nomination Pair of the Year (with Elena Vesnina)
- WTA Fan Favorite Doubles Team of the Year

2014

- The Russian Cup in the nomination Pair of the Year (with Elena Vesnina)

2016

- The Russian Cup in the nomination Pair of the Year (with Elena Vesnina)

Awards
Preceded by (United States) Serena Williams & (United States) Venus Williams	WTA Fan Favorite Doubles Team of the Year (with (Russia) Elena Vesnina); 2013	Succeeded by (Italy) Sara Errani & (Italy) Roberta Vinci
