= 2018 Generali Open Kitzbühel – Singles =

Singles
- 2018 Generali Open Kitzbühel

Final
- Champion: (Slovakia) Martin Kližan
- Runner-up: (Uzbekistan) Denis Istomin
- Score: 6–2, 6–2

Details
- Draw: 28 (4 Q / 3 WC )
- Seeds: 8

Events
Singles	Doubles
← 2017 ·	Generali Open Kitzbühel	· 2019 →

Martin Kližan won the title, defeating Denis Istomin in the final, 6–2, 6–2. This was the second final in ATP history to be contested between two qualifiers, the first occurring at the 2015 Apia International Sydney.

Philipp Kohlschreiber was the defending champion, but lost in the second round to Istomin.

== Seeds ==
The top four seeds receive a bye into the second round.

1. (Austria) Dominic Thiem (second round)
2. (Germany) Philipp Kohlschreiber (second round)
3. (Spain) Fernando Verdasco (second round)
4. (Netherlands) Robin Haase (second round)
5. (France) Gilles Simon (first round)
6. (Germany) Maximilian Marterer (quarterfinals)
7. (Germany) Jan-Lennard Struff (first round)
8. (Serbia) Dušan Lajović (quarterfinals)

== Draw ==
=== Key ===
- Q = Qualifier
- WC = Wild card
- LL = Lucky loser
- Alt = Alternate
- SE = Special exempt
- PR = Protected ranking
- ITF = ITF entry
- JE = Junior exempt
- w/o = Walkover
- r = Retired
- d = Defaulted
- SR = Special ranking

=== Finals ===
Semifinals
Q	(Slovakia) Martin Kližan	7^{7}	6
(Spain) Jaume Munar	6^{3}	3
(Chile) Nicolás Jarry	5	7^{7}	4
Q	(Uzbekistan) Denis Istomin	7	6^{4}	6

Final
Q	(Slovakia) Martin Kližan	6	6
Q	(Uzbekistan) Denis Istomin	2	2

=== Top half ===
First round
WC	(Austria) S Ofner	2	4
Q	(Slovakia) M Kližan	6	6
Q	(Austria) J Rodionov	4	6	1
WC	(Austria) D Novak	6	0	6
(Spain) G García López	4	2
8	(Serbia) D Lajović	6	6
(Spain) J Munar	2	7^{7}	6
Q	(Germany) Y Hanfmann	6	6^{5}	1
(Serbia) L Đere	6	6
(Georgia (country)) N Basilashvili	3	3
(Japan) T Daniel	7^{7}	6
7	(Germany) J-L Struff	6^{3}	1

Second round
1	(Austria) D Thiem	1	6	5
Q	(Slovakia) M Kližan	6	1	7
WC	(Austria) D Novak	2	4
8	(Serbia) D Lajović	6	6
4	(Netherlands) R Haase	6^{5}	4
(Spain) J Munar	7^{7}	6
(Serbia) L Đere	3	2
(Japan) T Daniel	6	6

Quarterfinals
Q	(Slovakia) M Kližan	4	7^{8}	6
8	(Serbia) D Lajović	6	6^{6}	2
(Spain) J Munar	7^{7}	6
(Japan) T Daniel	6^{3}	3

Semifinals
Q	(Slovakia) M Kližan	7^{7}	6
(Spain) J Munar	6^{3}	3

=== Bottom half ===
First round
5	(France) G Simon	6	3	4
(Italy) M Berrettini	1	6	6
SE	(Slovakia) J Kovalík	1	3
(Moldova) R Albot	6	6
(Spain) R Carballés Baena	6^{3}	7^{7}	4
(Chile) N Jarry	7^{7}	6^{5}	6
6	(Germany) M Marterer	6	3	6
SE	(Estonia) J Zopp	4	6	3
WC	(France) C Moutet	6	3	4
(Kazakhstan) M Kukushkin	4	6	6
Q	(Uzbekistan) D Istomin	7^{7}	6
(Argentina) F Delbonis	6^{5}	2

Second round
(Italy) M Berrettini	6	6^{3}	6
(Moldova) R Albot	3	7^{7}	1
(Chile) N Jarry	6^{6}	7	6
3	(Spain) F Verdasco	7^{8}	5	3
6	(Germany) M Marterer	6	6
(Kazakhstan) M Kukushkin	3	4
Q	(Uzbekistan) D Istomin	5	6	6
2	(Germany) P Kohlschreiber	7	3	1

Quarterfinals
(Italy) M Berrettini	5	3
(Chile) N Jarry	7	6
6	(Germany) M Marterer	3	3
Q	(Uzbekistan) D Istomin	6	6

Semifinals
(Chile) N Jarry	5	7^{7}	4
Q	(Uzbekistan) D Istomin	7	6^{4}	6

== Qualifying ==
=== Seeds ===
1. (Uzbekistan) Denis Istomin (qualified)
2. (Germany) Yannick Hanfmann (qualified)
3. (Austria) Gerald Melzer (qualifying competition)
4. (Latvia) Ernests Gulbis (first round)
5. (Slovakia) Martin Kližan (qualified)
6. (Argentina) Guido Andreozzi (first round)
7. (Germany) Yannick Maden (qualifying competition)
8. (Italy) Lorenzo Sonego (qualifying competition)

=== Qualifiers ===
1. (Uzbekistan) Denis Istomin
2. (Germany) Yannick Hanfmann
3. (Slovakia) Martin Kližan
4. (Austria) Jurij Rodionov

=== Qualifying draw ===
==== First qualifier ====
First round
1	(Uzbekistan) Denis Istomin	6	6
(France) Elliot Benchetrit	3	2
(Brazil) Thiago Monteiro	3	6	7
6	(Argentina) Guido Andreozzi	6	4	5

Qualifying competition
1	(Uzbekistan) Denis Istomin	6	6^{7}	7
(Brazil) Thiago Monteiro	1	7^{9}	5

==== Second qualifier ====
First round
2	(Germany) Yannick Hanfmann	6	7
WC	(Brazil) Thiago Seyboth Wild	2	5
(Croatia) Viktor Galović	4	4
7	(Germany) Yannick Maden	6	6

Qualifying competition
2	(Germany) Yannick Hanfmann	6	6
7	(Germany) Yannick Maden	4	4

==== Third qualifier ====
First round
3	(Austria) Gerald Melzer	6	0
(Slovenia) Blaž Rola	4	1^{r}
(Argentina) Facundo Bagnis	6	4	6^{0}
5	(Slovakia) Martin Kližan	4	6	7^{7}

Qualifying competition
3	(Austria) Gerald Melzer	1	3
5	(Slovakia) Martin Kližan	6	6

==== Fourth qualifier ====
First round
4	(Latvia) Ernests Gulbis	2	4
(Austria) Jurij Rodionov	6	6
WC	(Austria) Matthias Haim	7^{7}	3	4
8	(Italy) Lorenzo Sonego	6^{5}	6	6

Qualifying competition
(Austria) Jurij Rodionov	6	6
8	(Italy) Lorenzo Sonego	1	4

== Sources ==
- Main draw
- Qualifying draw
