= 2016 Generali Open Kitzbühel – Singles =

Singles
- 2016 Generali Open Kitzbühel

Final
- Champion: (Italy) Paolo Lorenzi
- Runner-up: (Georgia (country)) Nikoloz Basilashvili
- Score: 6–3, 6–4

Events
Singles	Doubles
← 2015 ·	Generali Open Kitzbühel	· 2017 →

Paolo Lorenzi won the title, defeating Nikoloz Basilashvili in the final, 6–3, 6–4. At the age of 34 years and seven months, Lorenzi became the oldest first-time champion in ATP history.

Philipp Kohlschreiber was the defending champion, but lost in the second round to Karen Khachanov.

== Seeds ==
The top four seeds receive a bye into the second round.

1. (Austria) Dominic Thiem (second round)
2. (Germany) Philipp Kohlschreiber (second round)
3. (Spain) Marcel Granollers (second round)
4. (Italy) Paolo Lorenzi (champion)
5. (Czech Republic) Lukáš Rosol (first round)
6. (Serbia) Dušan Lajović (semifinals)
7. (Spain) Íñigo Cervantes (first round)
8. (Germany) Jan-Lennard Struff (quarterfinals)

== Draw ==
=== Key ===
- Q = Qualifier
- WC = Wild card
- LL = Lucky loser
- Alt = Alternate
- SE = Special exempt
- PR = Protected ranking
- ITF = ITF entry
- JE = Junior exempt
- w/o = Walkover
- r = Retired
- d = Defaulted
- SR = Special ranking

=== Finals ===
Semifinals
(Austria) Gerald Melzer	6^{4}	6^{13}
4	(Italy) Paolo Lorenzi	7^{7}	7^{15}
(Georgia (country)) Nikoloz Basilashvili	6	6
6	(Serbia) Dušan Lajović	3	1

Final
4	(Italy) Paolo Lorenzi	6	6
(Georgia (country)) Nikoloz Basilashvili	3	4

=== Top half ===
First round
WC	(Austria) J Melzer	6	7^{7}
(Japan) T Daniel	4	6^{4}
(Spain) A Montañés	7	5	4
(Austria) G Melzer	5	7	6
Q	(Spain) D Gimeno Traver	6	6
7	(Spain) Í Cervantes	4	4
(Spain) R Carballés Baena	6	6
WC	(Austria) D Novak	0	2
(Germany) M Berrer	3	3
(Spain) D Muñoz de la Nava	6	6
WC	(Japan) A Santillan	2	2
8	(Germany) J-L Struff	6	6

Second round
1	(Austria) D Thiem	3	5
WC	(Austria) J Melzer	6	7
(Austria) G Melzer	6	6
Q	(Spain) D Gimeno Traver	3	1
4	(Italy) P Lorenzi	6	6
(Spain) R Carballés Baena	2	2
(Spain) D Muñoz de la Nava	5	5
8	(Germany) J-L Struff	7	7

Quarterfinals
WC	(Austria) J Melzer	6	3	1
(Austria) G Melzer	3	6	6
4	(Italy) P Lorenzi	6	6^{5}	7
8	(Germany) J-L Struff	2	7^{7}	5

Semifinals
(Austria) G Melzer	6^{4}	6^{13}
4	(Italy) P Lorenzi	7^{7}	7^{15}

=== Bottom half ===
First round
5	(Czech Republic) L Rosol	4	6^{4}
(Georgia (country)) N Basilashvili	6	7^{7}
(Netherlands) I Sijsling	7	6
Q	(France) K de Schepper	5	2
(Czech Republic) A Pavlásek	6	6
Q	(Argentina) M González	3	4
6	(Serbia) D Lajović	7^{9}	6
(Brazil) R Dutra Silva	6^{7}	1
(Germany) M Zverev	7^{7}	7^{7}
(Argentina) F Bagnis	6^{5}	6^{5}
(Russia) K Khachanov	6	6
Q	(Italy) F Volandri	2	4

Second round
(Georgia (country)) N Basilashvili	6	4	6
(Netherlands) I Sijsling	4	6	2
(Czech Republic) A Pavlásek	6	6
3	(Spain) M Granollers	2	4
6	(Serbia) D Lajović	6	6
(Germany) M Zverev	4	4
(Russia) K Khachanov	6	6
2	(Germany) P Kohlschreiber	4	4

Quarterfinals
(Georgia (country)) N Basilashvili	5	7^{7}	6
(Czech Republic) A Pavlásek	7	6^{2}	3
6	(Serbia) D Lajović	6	6
(Russia) K Khachanov	3	2

Semifinals
(Georgia (country)) N Basilashvili	6	6
6	(Serbia) D Lajović	3	1

== Qualifying ==
=== Seeds ===
1. (Argentina) Guido Andreozzi (qualifying competition)
2. (Argentina) Máximo González (qualified)
3. (Spain) Daniel Gimeno Traver (qualified)
4. (France) Kenny de Schepper (qualified)
5. (Canada) Steven Diez (qualifying competition)
6. (Italy) Filippo Volandri (qualified)
7. (Kazakhstan) Dmitry Popko (qualifying competition)
8. (Italy) Matteo Donati (qualifying competition)

=== Qualifiers ===
1. (Italy) Filippo Volandri
2. (Argentina) Máximo González
3. (Spain) Daniel Gimeno Traver
4. (France) Kenny de Schepper

=== Qualifying draw ===
==== First qualifier ====
First round
1	(Argentina) Guido Andreozzi	3	7	6
(Italy) Lorenzo Sonego	6	5	4
(Germany) Nils Langer	1	6	6^{4}
6	(Italy) Filippo Volandri	6	2	7^{7}

Qualifying competition
1	(Argentina) Guido Andreozzi	6	2	3
6	(Italy) Filippo Volandri	0	6	6

==== Second qualifier ====
First round
2	(Argentina) Máximo González	6	6
(France) Maxime Teixeira	0	2
WC	(Austria) Lenny Hampel	6	3	4
7	(Kazakhstan) Dmitry Popko	4	6	6

Qualifying competition
2	(Argentina) Máximo González	6	6
7	(Kazakhstan) Dmitry Popko	1	3

==== Third qualifier ====
First round
3	(Spain) Daniel Gimeno Traver	6	7^{7}
WC	(Austria) Lucas Miedler	4	6^{3}
PR	(Germany) Matthias Bachinger	7^{8}	2	2
8	(Italy) Matteo Donati	6^{6}	6	6

Qualifying competition
3	(Spain) Daniel Gimeno Traver	6	3	6
8	(Italy) Matteo Donati	2	6	3

==== Fourth qualifier ====
First round
4	(France) Kenny de Schepper	6	6
(Austria) Pascal Brunner	3	2
(Argentina) Juan Ignacio Galarza	5	2
5	(Canada) Steven Diez	7	6

Qualifying competition
4	(France) Kenny de Schepper	6	1	7^{8}
5	(Canada) Steven Diez	3	6	6^{6}
