= 2017 Generali Open Kitzbühel – Doubles =

Doubles
- 2017 Generali Open Kitzbühel

Final
- Champions: (Uruguay) Pablo Cuevas (Argentina) Guillermo Durán
- Runners-up: (Chile) Hans Podlipnik-Castillo (Belarus) Andrei Vasilevski
- Score: 6–4, 4–6, [12–10]

Events
Singles	Doubles
← 2016 ·	Generali Open Kitzbühel	· 2018 →

Wesley Koolhof and Matwé Middelkoop were the defending champions, but Koolhof chose to compete in Los Cabos instead. Middelkoop played alongside Julian Knowle, but lost in the semifinals to Hans Podlipnik-Castillo and Andrei Vasilevski.

Pablo Cuevas and Guillermo Durán won the title, defeating Podlipnik-Castillo and Vasilevski in the final, 6–4, 4–6, [12–10].

== Seeds ==
1. (Poland) Marcin Matkowski / (Serbia) Nenad Zimonjić (quarterfinals)
2. (Chile) Julio Peralta / (Argentina) Horacio Zeballos (quarterfinals)
3. (New Zealand) Marcus Daniell / (Brazil) Marcelo Demoliner (quarterfinals)
4. (Uruguay) Pablo Cuevas / (Argentina) Guillermo Durán (champions)

== Draw ==
=== Key ===
- Q = Qualifier
- WC = Wild card
- LL = Lucky loser
- Alt = Alternate
- SE = Special exempt
- PR = Protected ranking
- ITF = ITF entry
- JE = Junior exempt
- w/o = Walkover
- r = Retired
- d = Defaulted
- SR = Special ranking

First round
1	(Poland) M Matkowski (Serbia) N Zimonjić	7^{7}	7^{7}
(Czech Republic) R Jebavý (Czech Republic) J Veselý	6^{5}	6^{4}
WC	(Austria) G Melzer (Austria) T-S Weissborn	5	3
(Belarus) M Mirnyi (Austria) P Oswald	7	6
4	(Uruguay) P Cuevas (Argentina) G Durán	6	3	[10]
(Netherlands) R Haase (United Kingdom) D Inglot	4	6	[5]
(Germany) A Begemann (Germany) J-L Struff	6	6
(Argentina) C Berlocq (Russia) A Kuznetsov	3	4
WC	(Germany) T Haas (Austria) S Ofner	1	4
(Austria) J Knowle (Netherlands) M Middelkoop	6	6
(Brazil) T Bellucci (Brazil) A Sá	4	4
3	(New Zealand) M Daniell (Brazil) M Demoliner	6	6
(Brazil) R Dutra Silva (Italy) P Lorenzi	3	2
(Chile) H Podlipnik-Castillo (Belarus) A Vasilevski	6	6
Alt	(Georgia (country)) N Basilashvili (Belarus) A Bury	1	0
2	(Chile) J Peralta (Argentina) H Zeballos	6	6

Quarterfinals
1	(Poland) M Matkowski (Serbia) N Zimonjić	6	6^{3}	[6]
(Belarus) M Mirnyi (Austria) P Oswald	4	7^{7}	[10]
4	(Uruguay) P Cuevas (Argentina) G Durán	7^{7}	6
(Germany) A Begemann (Germany) J-L Struff	6^{5}	0
(Austria) J Knowle (Netherlands) M Middelkoop	6	6
3	(New Zealand) M Daniell (Brazil) M Demoliner	4	4
(Chile) H Podlipnik-Castillo (Belarus) A Vasilevski	3	6	[10]
2	(Chile) J Peralta (Argentina) H Zeballos	6	3	[8]

Semifinals
(Belarus) M Mirnyi (Austria) P Oswald	2	6	[8]
4	(Uruguay) P Cuevas (Argentina) G Durán	6	3	[10]
(Austria) J Knowle (Netherlands) M Middelkoop	5	6	[7]
(Chile) H Podlipnik-Castillo (Belarus) A Vasilevski	7	3	[10]

Final
4	(Uruguay) P Cuevas (Argentina) G Durán	6	4	[12]
(Chile) H Podlipnik-Castillo (Belarus) A Vasilevski	4	6	[10]
