= 2015 Apia International Sydney – Men's doubles =

Men's doubles
- 2015 Apia International Sydney

Final
- Champions: (India) Rohan Bopanna (Canada) Daniel Nestor
- Runners-up: (Netherlands) Jean-Julien Rojer (Romania) Horia Tecău
- Score: 6–4, 7–6^{(7–5)}

Events
Singles	men	women
Doubles	men	women
← 2014 ·	Sydney International	· 2016 →

Daniel Nestor and Nenad Zimonjić were the defending champions, but chose not to participate together. Nestor plays alongside Rohan Bopanna. Zimonjić teamed up with Aisam-ul-Haq Qureshi, but lost in the quarterfinals to Robert Lindstedt and Marcin Matkowski.

Rohan Bopanna and Daniel Nestor won the title.

== Seeds ==
1. (France) Julien Benneteau / (France) Édouard Roger-Vasselin (semifinals)
2. (Netherlands) Jean-Julien Rojer / (Romania) Horia Tecău (final)
3. (India) Rohan Bopanna / (Canada) Daniel Nestor (champions)
4. (Pakistan) Aisam-ul-Haq Qureshi / (Serbia) Nenad Zimonjić (quarterfinals)

== Draw ==
Key

- Q = Qualifier
- WC = Wild card
- LL = Lucky loser
- Alt = Alternate
- ITF = ITF entry
- PR = Protected ranking
- SR = Special ranking
- SE = Special exempt
- JE = Junior exempt
- JR = Junior Accelerator Programme entrant
- CO = College Accelerator Programme entrant
- NG = Next Gen Accelerator Program entrant
- w/o = Walkover
- r = Retired
- d = Defaulted

=== Finals ===
First round
1	(France) J Benneteau (France) É Roger-Vasselin	6	6
(Austria) J Knowle (Austria) P Oswald	4	2
(United States) E Butorac (Australia) S Groth	4	6	[4]
(Russia) T Gabashvili (Ukraine) S Stakhovsky	6	4	[10]
3	(India) R Bopanna (Canada) D Nestor	6^{11}	7	[10]
(Uruguay) P Cuevas (Spain) D Marrero	7^{13}	5	[6]
(Italy) S Bolelli (Italy) F Fognini	6	7
(Spain) P Andújar (Argentina) L Mayer	4	5
WC	(Australia) N Kyrgios (Australia) M Matosevic
(Sweden) R Lindstedt (Poland) M Matkowski	w/o
(Kazakhstan) A Golubev (Uzbekistan) D Istomin	4	4
4	(Pakistan) A-u-H Qureshi (Serbia) N Zimonjić	6	6
(Croatia) M Draganja (Finland) H Kontinen	4	6^{9}
(Germany) B Becker (United States) N Monroe	6	7^{11}
WC	(Australia) J Duckworth (Australia) C Guccione	2	6^{7}
2	(Netherlands) J-J Rojer (Romania) H Tecău	6	7^{9}

Quarterfinals
1	(France) J Benneteau (France) É Roger-Vasselin	7^{7}	3	[10]
(Russia) T Gabashvili (Ukraine) S Stakhovsky	6^{1}	6	[5]
3	(India) R Bopanna (Canada) D Nestor	7	6
(Italy) S Bolelli (Italy) F Fognini	5	3
(Sweden) R Lindstedt (Poland) M Matkowski	6	6
4	(Pakistan) A-u-H Qureshi (Serbia) N Zimonjić	4	3
(Germany) B Becker (United States) N Monroe	2	3
2	(Netherlands) J-J Rojer (Romania) H Tecău	6	6

Semifinals
1	(France) J Benneteau (France) É Roger-Vasselin	6	3	[3]
3	(India) R Bopanna (Canada) D Nestor	2	6	[10]
(Sweden) R Lindstedt (Poland) M Matkowski	3	6	[8]
2	(Netherlands) J-J Rojer (Romania) H Tecău	6	3	[10]

Final
3	(India) R Bopanna (Canada) D Nestor	6	7^{7}
2	(Netherlands) J-J Rojer (Romania) H Tecău	4	6^{5}
