= 2020 Generali Open Kitzbühel =

- Date: 6 – 13 September
- Edition: 76th
- Category: ATP Tour 250 series
- Surface: Clay / Outdoor
- Location: Kitzbühel, Austria
- Venue: Tennis stadium Kitzbühel

Champions

Singles
- (Serbia) Miomir Kecmanović

Doubles
- (United States) Austin Krajicek / (Croatia) Franko Škugor
← 2019 ·	Generali Open Kitzbühel	· 2021 →

The 2020 Generali Open Kitzbühel was a tennis tournament played on outdoor clay courts. It is the 76th edition of the Austrian Open Kitzbühel, and part of the ATP Tour 250 series of the 2020 ATP Tour. It will take place at the Tennis stadium Kitzbühel in Kitzbühel, Austria, from 6 to 13 September.

== Singles main draw entrants ==
=== Seeds ===
Country	Player	Rank^{1}	Seed
ITA	Fabio Fognini	12	1
ARG	Diego Schwartzman	13	2
SRB	Dušan Lajović	24	3
GEO	Nikoloz Basilashvili	30	4
POL	Hubert Hurkacz	33	5
JPN	Kei Nishikori	34	6
ARG	Guido Pella	36	7
ESP	Albert Ramos Viñolas	41	8

- ^{1} Rankings as of August 31, 2020.

=== Other entrants ===
The following players received wildcards into the singles main draw:

- (Germany) Philipp Kohlschreiber
- (Austria) Dennis Novak
- (Austria) Sebastian Ofner
- (Finland) Emil Ruusuvuori
- (Italy) Jannik Sinner

The following players received entry from the qualifying draw:

- (Argentina) Federico Delbonis
- (Serbia) Laslo Đere
- (Germany) Yannick Hanfmann
- (France) Pierre-Hugues Herbert
- (Switzerland) Marc-Andrea Hüsler
- (Germany) Maximilian Marterer

=== Withdrawals ===
- (Canada) Félix Auger-Aliassime → replaced by (Kazakhstan) Alexander Bublik
- (Spain) Roberto Bautista Agut → replaced by (Argentina) Guido Pella
- (Italy) Matteo Berrettini → replaced by (Serbia) Miomir Kecmanović
- (Spain) Pablo Carreño Busta → replaced by (Moldova) Radu Albot
- (Australia) Alex de Minaur → replaced by (Spain) Feliciano López
- (United States) Taylor Fritz → replaced by (Portugal) João Sousa
- (Chile) Cristian Garín → replaced by (Spain) Albert Ramos Viñolas
- (Russia) Andrey Rublev → replaced by (Japan) Yoshihito Nishioka
- (Canada) Denis Shapovalov → replaced by (Australia) Jordan Thompson
- (Austria) Dominic Thiem → replaced by (Argentina) Juan Ignacio Londero
- (Germany) Alexander Zverev → replaced by (Australia) John Millman

== Doubles main draw entrants ==
=== Seeds ===
Country	Player	Country	Player	Rank^{1}	Seed
ESP	Marcel Granollers	ARG	Horacio Zeballos	19	1
CRO	Ivan Dodig	SVK	Filip Polášek	19	2
AUT	Oliver Marach	AUT	Jürgen Melzer	57	3
USA	Austin Krajicek	CRO	Franko Škugor	72	4

- ^{1} Rankings as of August 31, 2020.

=== Other entrants ===
The following pairs received wildcards into the doubles main draw:

- (Austria) Lucas Miedler / (Austria) Dennis Novak
- (Austria) Sebastian Ofner / (Austria) Jurij Rodionov

== Champions ==
=== Singles ===
- (Serbia) Miomir Kecmanović def. (Germany) Yannick Hanfmann, 6–4, 6–4.

=== Doubles ===
- (United States) Austin Krajicek / (Croatia) Franko Škugor def. (Spain) Marcel Granollers / (Argentina) Horacio Zeballos, 7–6^{(7–5)}, 7–5.
