= 2019 Generali Open Kitzbühel – Doubles =

Doubles
- 2019 Generali Open Kitzbühel

Final
- Champions: (Austria) Philipp Oswald (Slovakia) Filip Polášek
- Runners-up: (Belgium) Sander Gillé (Belgium) Joran Vliegen
- Score: 6–4, 6–4

Events
Singles	Doubles
← 2018 ·	Generali Open Kitzbühel	· 2020 →

Roman Jebavý and Andrés Molteni were the defending champions, but chose not to participate together. Jebavý played alongside Matwé Middelkoop but lost in the semifinals to Philipp Oswald and Filip Polášek. Molteni partnered Leonardo Mayer but lost in the first round to Oliver Marach and Jürgen Melzer.

Oswald and Polášek went on to win the title, defeating Sander Gillé and Joran Vliegen in the final, 6–4, 6–4.

== Seeds ==
1. (Austria) Oliver Marach / (Austria) Jürgen Melzer (quarterfinals)
2. (Austria) Philipp Oswald / (Slovakia) Filip Polášek (champions)
3. (Czech Republic) Roman Jebavý / (Netherlands) Matwé Middelkoop (semifinals)
4. (Belgium) Sander Gillé / (Belgium) Joran Vliegen (final)

== Draw ==
=== Key ===
- Q = Qualifier
- WC = Wild card
- LL = Lucky loser
- Alt = Alternate
- ITF = ITF entry
- PR = Protected ranking
- SR = Special ranking
- SE = Special exempt
- JE = Junior exempt
- JR = Junior Accelerator Programme entrant
- CO = College Accelerator Programme entrant
- NG = Next Gen Accelerator Program entrant
- w/o = Walkover
- r = Retired
- d = Defaulted

=== Draw ===
First round
1	(Austria) O Marach (Austria) J Melzer	7^{11}	2	[10]
(Argentina) L Mayer (Argentina) A Molteni	6^{9}	6	[3]
(Chinese Taipei) C-p Hsieh (Indonesia) C Rungkat	7^{7}	2	[13]
(Denmark) F Nielsen (Germany) T Pütz	6^{3}	6	[15]
4	(Belgium) S Gillé (Belgium) J Vliegen	4	7^{7}	[10]
PR	(Slovakia) M Kližan (Serbia) N Zimonjić	6	6^{5}	[7]
WC	(Chile) N Massú (Austria) M Thiem	3	2
(Bolivia) H Dellien (Spain) D Vega Hernández	6	6
(Italy) T Fabbiano (Chile) H Podlipnik Castillo	4	7^{8}	[10]
(Italy) S Bolelli (Italy) L Sonego	6	6^{6}	[5]
(Ukraine) D Molchanov (Slovakia) I Zelenay	4	3
3	(Czech Republic) R Jebavý (Netherlands) M Middelkoop	6	6
(Uruguay) P Cuevas (Argentina) G Durán	6	7^{9}
WC	(Austria) L Miedler (Austria) S Ofner	4	6^{7}
(Spain) R Carballés Baena (Spain) J Munar	6^{3}	5
2	(Austria) P Oswald (Slovakia) F Polášek	7^{7}	7

Quarterfinals
1	(Austria) O Marach (Austria) J Melzer	3	6^{3}
(Denmark) F Nielsen (Germany) T Pütz	6	7^{7}
4	(Belgium) S Gillé (Belgium) J Vliegen	5	6	[10]
(Bolivia) H Dellien (Spain) D Vega Hernández	7	1	[7]
(Italy) T Fabbiano (Chile) H Podlipnik Castillo	4	1
3	(Czech Republic) R Jebavý (Netherlands) M Middelkoop	6	6
(Uruguay) P Cuevas (Argentina) G Durán	3	6	[2]
2	(Austria) P Oswald (Slovakia) F Polášek	6	4	[10]

Semifinals
(Denmark) F Nielsen (Germany) T Pütz	1	3
4	(Belgium) S Gillé (Belgium) J Vliegen	6	6
3	(Czech Republic) R Jebavý (Netherlands) M Middelkoop	2	6	[3]
2	(Austria) P Oswald (Slovakia) F Polášek	6	3	[10]

Final
4	(Belgium) S Gillé (Belgium) J Vliegen	4	4
2	(Austria) P Oswald (Slovakia) F Polášek	6	6
