= 2021 Generali Open Kitzbühel – Doubles =

Doubles
- 2021 Generali Open Kitzbühel

Final
- Champions: (Austria) Alexander Erler (Austria) Lucas Miedler
- Runners-up: (Czech Republic) Roman Jebavý (Netherlands) Matwé Middelkoop
- Score: 7–5, 7–6^{(7–5)}

Events
Singles	Doubles
← 2020 ·	Generali Open Kitzbühel	· 2022 →

Austin Krajicek and Franko Škugor were the defending champions, but Krajicek chose to compete at the Summer Olympics and Škugor chose not to defend his title.

Alexander Erler and Lucas Miedler won the title, defeating Roman Jebavý and Matwé Middelkoop in the final, 7–5, 7–6^{(7–5)}.

== Seeds ==
1. (Bosnia and Herzegovina) Tomislav Brkić / (Serbia) Nikola Ćaćić (semifinals)
2. (Monaco) Hugo Nys / (Italy) Andrea Vavassori (quarterfinals)
3. (Czech Republic) Roman Jebavý / (Netherlands) Matwé Middelkoop (final)
4. (Uruguay) Ariel Behar / (Argentina) Guillermo Durán (quarterfinals)

== Draw ==
=== Key ===
- Q = Qualifier
- WC = Wild card
- LL = Lucky loser
- Alt = Alternate
- SE = Special exempt
- PR = Protected ranking
- ITF = ITF entry
- JE = Junior exempt
- w/o = Walkover
- r = Retired
- d = Defaulted
- SR = Special ranking

First round
1	(Bosnia and Herzegovina) T Brkić (Serbia) N Ćaćić	6	6
(Netherlands) D Pel (France) A Rinderknech	2	3
(Brazil) R Matos (Belarus) A Vasilevski	6	7
(Italy) M Cecchinato (Italy) S Travaglia	3	5
4	(Uruguay) A Behar (Argentina) G Durán	6	6^{4}	[13]
(Moldova) R Albot (Ukraine) D Molchanov	1	7^{7}	[11]
WC	(Austria) A Erler (Austria) L Miedler	7^{7}	6
(Uruguay) P Cuevas (Brazil) T Seyboth Wild	6^{4}	3
(Monaco) R Arneodo (Kazakhstan) A Nedovyesov	3	6^{5}
(Germany) A Begemann (Slovakia) I Zelenay	6	7^{7}
(Venezuela) LD Martínez (New Zealand) A Sitak	7^{7}	4	[1]
3	(Czech Republic) R Jebavý (Netherlands) M Middelkoop	6^{5}	6	[10]
(Spain) P Martínez (Australia) M Polmans	6	6
PR	(Spain) M López (Spain) J Munar	4	0
WC	(Austria) N Oberleitner (Austria) T-S Weissborn	6^{6}	2
2	(Monaco) H Nys (Italy) A Vavassori	7^{8}	6

Quarterfinals
1	(Bosnia and Herzegovina) T Brkić (Serbia) N Ćaćić	7^{8}	2	[10]
(Brazil) R Matos (Belarus) A Vasilevski	6^{6}	6	[8]
4	(Uruguay) A Behar (Argentina) G Durán	7^{9}	4	[9]
WC	(Austria) A Erler (Austria) L Miedler	6^{7}	6	[11]
(Germany) A Begemann (Slovakia) I Zelenay	7^{7}	3	[9]
3	(Czech Republic) R Jebavý (Netherlands) M Middelkoop	6^{4}	6	[11]
(Spain) P Martínez (Australia) M Polmans	6^{5}	6	[10]
2	(Monaco) H Nys (Italy) A Vavassori	7^{7}	3	[8]

Semifinals
1	(Bosnia and Herzegovina) T Brkić (Serbia) N Ćaćić	6	1	[10]
WC	(Austria) A Erler (Austria) L Miedler	1	6	[12]
3	(Czech Republic) R Jebavý (Netherlands) M Middelkoop	6	1	[10]
(Spain) P Martínez (Australia) M Polmans	3	6	[7]

Final
WC	(Austria) A Erler (Austria) L Miedler	7	7^{7}
3	(Czech Republic) R Jebavý (Netherlands) M Middelkoop	5	6^{5}
