= 2019 Generali Open Kitzbühel =

- Date: 29 July – 4 August
- Edition: 75th
- Category: ATP 250 series
- Surface: Clay / Outdoor
- Location: Kitzbühel, Austria
- Venue: Tennis stadium Kitzbühel

Champions

Singles
- (Austria) Dominic Thiem

Doubles
- (Austria) Philipp Oswald / (Slovakia) Filip Polášek
← 2018 ·	Generali Open Kitzbühel	· 2020 →

The 2019 Generali Open Kitzbühel was a tennis tournament played on outdoor clay courts. It was the 75th edition of the Austrian Open Kitzbühel, and part of the ATP Tour 250 series of the 2019 ATP Tour. It took place at the Tennis stadium Kitzbühel in Kitzbühel, Austria, from July 29 through August 4.

== Singles main draw entrants ==
=== Seeds ===
Country	Player	Rank^{1}	Seed
AUT	Dominic Thiem	4	1
SRB	Dušan Lajović	26	2
ESP	Fernando Verdasco	30	3
URU	Pablo Cuevas	47	4
HUN	Márton Fucsovics	50	5
ARG	Leonardo Mayer	51	6
ITA	Lorenzo Sonego	52	7
ESP	Pablo Carreño Busta	59	8

- ^{1} Rankings are as of July 22, 2019

=== Other entrants ===
The following players received wildcards into the singles main draw:

- (Austria) Dennis Novak
- (Austria) Sebastian Ofner
- (Austria) Jurij Rodionov

The following player received entry using a protected ranking into the singles main draw:

- (Slovakia) Jozef Kovalík

The following players received entry as special exempt:

- (Italy) Thomas Fabbiano
- (Spain) Albert Ramos Viñolas

The following players received entry from the qualifying draw:

- (Germany) Matthias Bachinger
- (Bolivia) Hugo Dellien
- (Spain) Guillermo García López
- (Austria) Lucas Miedler

=== Withdrawals ===
- (Serbia) Filip Krajinović → replaced by (Spain) Jaume Munar
- (Portugal) João Sousa → replaced by (Slovakia) Jozef Kovalík

== Doubles main draw entrants ==
=== Seeds ===
Country	Player	Country	Player	Rank^{1}	Seed
AUT	Oliver Marach	AUT	Jürgen Melzer	59	1
AUT	Philipp Oswald	SVK	Filip Polášek	94	2
CZE	Roman Jebavý	NED	Matwé Middelkoop	102	3
BEL	Sander Gillé	BEL	Joran Vliegen	105	4

- Rankings are as of July 22, 2019

=== Other entrants ===
The following pairs received wildcards into the doubles main draw:

- (Chile) Nicolás Massú / (Austria) Moritz Thiem
- (Austria) Lucas Miedler / (Austria) Sebastian Ofner

The following pair received entry using a protected ranking into the doubles main draw:

- (Slovakia) Martin Kližan / (Serbia) Nenad Zimonjić

== Finals ==
=== Singles ===
- (Austria) Dominic Thiem defeated (Spain) Albert Ramos Viñolas, 7–6^{(7–0)}, 6–1

=== Doubles ===
- (Austria) Philipp Oswald / (Slovakia) Filip Polášek defeated (Belgium) Sander Gillé / (Belgium) Joran Vliegen, 6–4, 6–4
