= 2020 Generali Open Kitzbühel – Singles =

Singles
- 2020 Generali Open Kitzbühel

Final
- Champion: (Serbia) Miomir Kecmanović
- Runner-up: (Germany) Yannick Hanfmann
- Score: 6–4, 6–4

Events
Singles	Doubles
- Generali Open Kitzbühel

Miomir Kecmanović defeated Yannick Hanfmann in the final, 6–4, 6–4 to win the singles tennis title at the 2020 Austrian Open Kitzbühel. It was his first ATP Tour title.

Dominic Thiem was the reigning champion, but did not compete as he was still competing at the 2020 US Open.

== Seeds ==
1. (Italy) Fabio Fognini (second round)
2. (Argentina) Diego Schwartzman (quarterfinals)
3. (Serbia) Dušan Lajović (second round)
4. (Georgia (country)) Nikoloz Basilashvili (second round)
5. (Poland) Hubert Hurkacz (second round)
6. (Japan) Kei Nishikori (first round)
7. (Argentina) Guido Pella (second round)
8. (Spain) Albert Ramos Viñolas (first round)

== Draw ==
Key

- Q = Qualifier
- WC = Wild card
- LL = Lucky loser
- Alt = Alternate
- ITF = ITF entry
- PR = Protected ranking
- SR = Special ranking
- SE = Special exempt
- JE = Junior exempt
- JR = Junior Accelerator Programme entrant
- CO = College Accelerator Programme entrant
- NG = Next Gen Accelerator Program entrant
- w/o = Walkover
- r = Retired
- d = Defaulted

=== Finals ===
Semifinals
Q	(Switzerland) Marc-Andrea Hüsler	2	7	3
(Serbia) Miomir Kecmanović	6	5	6
Q	(Germany) Yannick Hanfmann	4	6	7^{7}
Q	(Serbia) Laslo Đere	6	3	6^{5}

Final
(Serbia) Miomir Kecmanović	6	6
Q	(Germany) Yannick Hanfmann	4	4

=== Top half ===
First round
Q	(Switzerland) M-A Hüsler	3	6	7^{7}
WC	(Finland) E Ruusuvuori	6	4	6^{2}
(Spain) F López	6	6
Q	(France) P-H Herbert	4	3
(Japan) Y Nishioka	3	0
7	(Argentina) G Pella	6	6
Q	(Argentina) F Delbonis	6	6
(Argentina) JI Londero	4	0
(Australia) J Thompson	6	4	7^{7}
(Australia) J Millman	3	6	6^{2}
(Serbia) M Kecmanović	4	6	6
6	(Japan) K Nishikori	6	4	2

Second round
1	(Italy) F Fognini	1	2
Q	(Switzerland) M-A Hüsler	6	6
(Spain) F López	7	6^{4}	7^{7}
7	(Argentina) G Pella	5	7^{7}	6^{3}
4	(Georgia (country)) N Basilashvili	5	3
Q	(Argentina) F Delbonis	7	6
(Australia) J Thompson	2	2
(Serbia) M Kecmanović	6	6

Quarterfinals
Q	(Switzerland) M-A Hüsler	6	6
(Spain) F López	4	3
Q	(Argentina) F Delbonis	4	7^{7}	5
(Serbia) M Kecmanović	6	6^{5}	7

Semifinals
Q	(Switzerland) M-A Hüsler	2	7	3
(Serbia) M Kecmanović	6	5	6

=== Bottom half ===
First round
5	(Poland) H Hurkacz	6	7
(Portugal) J Sousa	3	5
WC	(Austria) D Novak	6^{6}	4
Q	(Germany) M Marterer	7^{8}	6
(Kazakhstan) A Bublik	5	2
Q	(Germany) Y Hanfmann	7	6
8	(Spain) A Ramos Viñolas	1	6	6^{2}
Q	(Serbia) L Đere	6	3	7^{7}
WC	(Italy) J Sinner	6	6
WC	(Germany) P Kohlschreiber	3	2
WC	(Austria) S Ofner	6^{5}	6	7^{7}
(Moldova) R Albot	7^{7}	4	6^{4}

Second round
5	(Poland) H Hurkacz	1	4
Q	(Germany) M Marterer	6	6
Q	(Germany) Y Hanfmann	4	6	6
3	(Serbia) D Lajović	6	3	4
Q	(Serbia) L Đere	6	6
WC	(Italy) J Sinner	4	4
WC	(Austria) S Ofner	2	6	5
2	(Argentina) D Schwartzman	6	2	7

Quarterfinals
Q	(Germany) M Marterer	2	5
Q	(Germany) Y Hanfmann	6	7
Q	(Serbia) L Đere	7^{7}	6
2	(Argentina) D Schwartzman	6^{2}	3

Semifinals
Q	(Germany) Y Hanfmann	4	6	7^{7}
Q	(Serbia) L Đere	6	3	6^{5}

== Qualifying ==
=== Seeds ===
1. (France) Pierre-Hugues Herbert (qualified)
2. (Belarus) Egor Gerasimov (qualifying competition)
3. (Hungary) Attila Balázs (first round)
4. (Argentina) Federico Delbonis (qualified)
5. (Serbia) Laslo Đere (qualified)
6. (Brazil) Thiago Monteiro (qualifying competition)
7. (Australia) ~~James Duckworth~~ (withdrew)
8. (Italy) Andreas Seppi (qualifying competition)
9. (Germany) Dominik Koepfer (first round)
10. (Slovakia) Andrej Martin (first round)
11. (Germany) Yannick Hanfmann (qualified)
12. (India) Prajnesh Gunneswaran (qualifying competition)

=== Qualifiers ===
1. (France) Pierre-Hugues Herbert
2. (Germany) Maximilian Marterer
3. (Switzerland) Marc-Andrea Hüsler
4. (Argentina) Federico Delbonis
5. (Serbia) Laslo Đere
6. (Germany) Yannick Hanfmann

=== Qualifying draw ===
==== First qualifier ====
First round
1	(France) Pierre-Hugues Herbert	6	6
(United States) Maxime Cressy	1	3
WC	(Switzerland) Leandro Riedi	4	6	7^{7}
10	(Slovakia) Andrej Martin	6	4	6^{4}

Qualifying competition
1	(France) Pierre-Hugues Herbert	6	6
WC	(Switzerland) Leandro Riedi	3	4

==== Second qualifier ====
First round
2	(Belarus) Egor Gerasimov	7^{7}	6
WC	(Austria) Alexander Erler	6^{2}	3
Alt	(Germany) Maximilian Marterer	6^{1}	6	6
9	(Germany) Dominik Koepfer	7^{7}	3	2

Qualifying competition
2	(Belarus) Egor Gerasimov	4	4
Alt	(Germany) Maximilian Marterer	6	6

==== Third qualifier ====
First round
3	(Hungary) Attila Balázs	4	0
Alt	(Switzerland) Marc-Andrea Hüsler	6	6
WC	(Austria) Sandro Kopp	4	6	4
12	(India) Prajnesh Gunneswaran	6	1	6

Qualifying competition
Alt	(Switzerland) Marc-Andrea Hüsler	6	6
12	(India) Prajnesh Gunneswaran	3	3

==== Fourth qualifier ====
First round
4	(Argentina) Federico Delbonis	7^{7}	6
Alt	(Germany) Matthias Bachinger	6^{2}	4
(Austria) Jurij Rodionov	6	6
Alt	(Australia) Luke Saville	4	2

Qualifying competition
4	(Argentina) Federico Delbonis	6	6
(Austria) Jurij Rodionov	4	2

==== Fifth qualifier ====
First round
5	(Serbia) Laslo Đere	6	7
Alt	(Croatia) Viktor Galović	3	5
Alt	(Australia) Max Purcell	6	2	4
8	(Italy) Andreas Seppi	1	6	6

Qualifying competition
5	(Serbia) Laslo Đere	6	6
8	(Italy) Andreas Seppi	3	4

==== Sixth qualifier ====
First round
6	(Brazil) Thiago Monteiro	6	6^{5}	7
Alt	(Austria) Lucas Miedler	2	7^{7}	5
(Latvia) Ernests Gulbis	6^{3}	1
11	(Germany) Yannick Hanfmann	7^{7}	6

Qualifying competition
6	(Brazil) Thiago Monteiro	1	6	3
11	(Germany) Yannick Hanfmann	6	2	6
