= 2016 Apia International Sydney =

Coordinates: 33°51′18″S 151°4′20″E

- Date: 10–16 January 2016
- Edition: 124th
- Category: ATP World Tour 250 series / WTA Premier
- Draw: 32S / 16D
- Prize money: $461,330 (men) $753,000 (women)
- Surface: Hard
- Location: Sydney, Australia
- Venue: NSW Tennis Centre

Champions

Men's singles
- (Serbia) Viktor Troicki

Women's singles
- (Russia) Svetlana Kuznetsova

Men's doubles
- (United Kingdom) Jamie Murray / (Brazil) Bruno Soares

Women's doubles
- (Switzerland) Martina Hingis / (India) Sania Mirza
- Sydney International

The 2016 Apia International Sydney was a joint 2016 ATP World Tour and 2016 WTA Tour tennis tournament, played on outdoor hard courts in Sydney, New South Wales. It was the 123rd edition of the tournament and took place at the NSW Tennis Centre in Sydney, Australia. It was held from 10 January through 16 January 2016 as part of the Australian Open Series in preparation for the first Grand Slam of the year.

== Point distribution ==
Event	W	F	SF	QF	Round of 16	Round of 32	Q	Q3	Q2	Q1
Men's singles	250	150	90	45	20	0	12	6	0	0
Men's doubles	250	150	90	45	0	—N/a	—N/a	—N/a	—N/a	—N/a
Women's singles	470	305	185	100	55	1	25	18	13	1
Women's doubles	470	305	185	100	1	—N/a	—N/a	—N/a	—N/a	—N/a

== Prize money ==
Event	W	F	SF	QF	Round of 16	Round of 32^{1}	Q3	Q2	Q1
Men's singles	$72,000	$37,900	$20,545	$11,705	$6,900	$4,085	$1,840	$920	—N/a
Men's doubles*	$21,850	$11,500	$6,230	$3,570	$2,090	—N/a	—N/a	—N/a	—N/a
Women's singles	$128,800	$68,585	$36,600	$19,660	$10,540	$5,750	$3,010	$1,600	$885
Women's doubles*	$40,200	$21,465	$11,735	$5,970	$3,230	—N/a	—N/a	—N/a	—N/a

_{^{1}Qualifiers prize money is also the Round of 32 prize money.}
_{*per team}

== ATP singles main-draw entrants ==
=== Seeds ===
Country	Player	Rank^{1}	Seed
AUS	Bernard Tomic	18	1
AUT	Dominic Thiem	20	2
SRB	Viktor Troicki	22	3
BUL	Grigor Dimitrov	28	4
ITA	Andreas Seppi	29	5
FRA	Jérémy Chardy	31	6
ARG	Leonardo Mayer	35	7
UKR	Alexandr Dolgopolov	36	8

- ^{1} Rankings as of January 4, 2016

=== Other entrants ===
The following players received wildcards into the singles main draw:

- (Australia) James Duckworth
- (Australia) John Millman
- (Australia) Jordan Thompson

The following players received entry from the qualifying draw:

- (Kazakhstan) Mikhail Kukushkin
- (France) Nicolas Mahut
- (Germany) Maximilian Marterer
- (United States) Alexander Sarkissian

The following player received entry as a lucky loser:

- (Spain) Íñigo Cervantes

=== Withdrawals ===
Before the tournament

- (Serbia) Janko Tipsarević → replaced by (Italy) Simone Bolelli
- (France) Julien Benneteau (groin injury, late withdrawal) → replaced by (Spain) Íñigo Cervantes

=== Retirements ===
- (Slovakia) Martin Kližan (left shoulder injury)
- (Austria) Dominic Thiem (blisters)
- (Australia) Bernard Tomic

== ATP doubles main-draw entrants ==
=== Seeds ===
Country	Player	Country	Player	Rank^{1}	Seed
NED	Jean-Julien Rojer	ROU	Horia Tecău	5	1
USA	Bob Bryan	USA	Mike Bryan	9	2
BRA	Marcelo Melo	CAN	Daniel Nestor	19	3
IND	Rohan Bopanna	ROU	Florin Mergea	20	4

- ^{1} Rankings as of January 4, 2016

=== Other entrants ===
The following pairs received wildcards into the doubles main draw:

- (Australia) James Duckworth / (Australia) John Millman
- (Australia) Matt Reid / (Australia) Jordan Thompson

The following pair received entry as alternates:

- (Russia) Teymuraz Gabashvili / (Kazakhstan) Mikhail Kukushkin

=== Withdrawals ===
Before the tournament

- (United Kingdom) Dominic Inglot (abdominal pain)

== WTA singles main-draw entrants ==
=== Seeds ===
Country	Player	Rank^{1}	Seed
ROU	Simona Halep	2	1
~~POL~~	~~Agnieszka Radwańska~~	~~5~~	~~2~~
~~CZE~~	~~Petra Kvitová~~	~~6~~	~~3~~
GER	Angelique Kerber	10	4
CZE	Karolína Plíšková	11	5
SUI	Timea Bacsinszky	12	6
ESP	Carla Suárez Navarro	13	7
SUI	Belinda Bencic	14	8

- ^{1} Rankings as of January 4, 2016.

=== Other entrants ===
The following players received wildcards into the singles main draw:

- (Serbia) Ana Ivanovic
- (Australia) Tammi Patterson
- (Bulgaria) Tsvetana Pironkova

The following players received entry from the qualifying draw:

- (Spain) Lara Arruabarrena
- (Slovakia) Daniela Hantuchová
- (Croatia) Mirjana Lučić-Baroni
- (Puerto Rico) Monica Puig

The following players received entry as lucky losers:

- (Slovenia) Polona Hercog
- (Czech Republic) Lucie Hradecká
- (Slovakia) Magdaléna Rybáriková

=== Withdrawals ===
Before the tournament

- (Romania) Irina-Camelia Begu → replaced by (United States) CoCo Vandeweghe
- (Australia) Daria Gavrilova (left abdominal muscle injury) → replaced by (Slovakia) Magdaléna Rybáriková
- (United States) Madison Keys → replaced by (France) Caroline Garcia
- (Czech Republic) Petra Kvitová (gastrointestinal illness) → replaced by (Czech Republic) Lucie Hradecká
- (Poland) Agnieszka Radwańska (left leg injury) → replaced by (Slovenia) Polona Hercog
- (Czech Republic) Lucie Šafářová → replaced by (Ukraine) Lesia Tsurenko

During the tournament

- (Germany) Angelique Kerber (gastrointestinal illness)

=== Retirements ===
- (Switzerland) Belinda Bencic (Gastrointestinal illness)

== WTA doubles main-draw entrants ==
=== Seeds ===
Country	Player	Country	Player	Rank^{1}	Seed
SUI	Martina Hingis	IND	Sania Mirza	3	1
TPE	Chan Hao-ching	TPE	Chan Yung-jan	19	2
FRA	Caroline Garcia	FRA	Kristina Mladenovic	23	3
HUN	Tímea Babos	SLO	Katarina Srebotnik	25	4

- ^{1} Rankings as of January 4, 2016.

=== Withdrawals ===
Before the tournament

- (Germany) Julia Görges (left abdominal muscle injury)

== Champions ==
=== Men's singles ===
- (Serbia) Viktor Troicki def. (Bulgaria) Grigor Dimitrov 2–6, 6–1, 7–6^{(9–7)}

=== Women's singles ===
- (Russia) Svetlana Kuznetsova def. (Puerto Rico) Monica Puig, 6–0, 6–2.

=== Men's doubles ===
- (United Kingdom) Jamie Murray / (Brazil) Bruno Soares def. (India) Rohan Bopanna / (Romania) Florin Mergea, 6–3, 7–6^{(8–6)}.

=== Women's doubles ===
- (Switzerland) Martina Hingis / (India) Sania Mirza def. (France) Caroline Garcia / (France) Kristina Mladenovic, 1–6, 7–5, [10–5].

== Broadcast ==
Selected matches aired in Australia on 7Two, with live coverage of both day and night sessions. Every match was also available to be streamed live through a free 7Tennis mobile app.
