= 2020 Generali Open Kitzbühel – Doubles =

Doubles
- 2020 Generali Open Kitzbühel

Final
- Champions: (United States) Austin Krajicek (Croatia) Franko Škugor
- Runners-up: (Spain) Marcel Granollers (Argentina) Horacio Zeballos
- Score: 7–6^{(7–5)}, 7–5

Events
Singles	Doubles
← 2019 ·	Austrian Open Kitzbühel	· 2021 →

Philipp Oswald and Filip Polášek were the defending champions, but chose to participate with different partners. Oswald partnered Marcus Daniell and lost in the quarterfinals to Marcel Granollers and Horacio Zeballos. Polášek partnered Ivan Dodig and lost in the semifinals to Austin Krajicek and Franko Škugor.

Krajicek and Škugor went on to win the title, defeating Granollers and Zeballos in the final, 7–6^{(7–5)}, 7–5.

== Seeds ==
1. (Spain) Marcel Granollers / (Argentina) Horacio Zeballos (final)
2. (Croatia) Ivan Dodig / (Slovakia) Filip Polášek (semifinals)
3. (Austria) Oliver Marach / (Austria) Jürgen Melzer (semifinals)
4. (United States) Austin Krajicek / (Croatia) Franko Škugor (champions)

== Draw ==
=== Key ===
- Q = Qualifier
- WC = Wild card
- LL = Lucky loser
- Alt = Alternate
- SE = Special exempt
- PR = Protected ranking
- ITF = ITF entry
- JE = Junior exempt
- w/o = Walkover
- r = Retired
- d = Defaulted
- SR = Special ranking

=== Draw ===
First round
1	(Spain) M Granollers (Argentina) H Zeballos	6	6
(Japan) K Nishikori (Japan) Y Nishioka	2	3
(Moldova) R Albot (Georgia (country)) N Basilashvili	1	4
(New Zealand) M Daniell (Austria) P Oswald	6	6
3	(Austria) O Marach (Austria) J Melzer	6	6
(Argentina) JI Londero (Spain) A Ramos Viñolas	2	2
(Brazil) M Demoliner (Netherlands) M Middelkoop	7	6
WC	(Austria) S Ofner (Austria) J Rodionov	5	4
(Australia) M Purcell (Australia) L Saville	6	6
(Kazakhstan) A Bublik (Poland) H Hurkacz	2	4
(Serbia) N Ćaćić (Serbia) D Lajović	7	3	[7]
4	(United States) A Krajicek (Croatia) F Škugor	5	6	[10]
(Italy) F Fognini (Sweden) R Lindstedt	3	2
(United Kingdom) L Bambridge (Japan) B McLachlan	6	6
WC	(Austria) L Miedler (Austria) D Novak	1	2
2	(Croatia) I Dodig (Slovakia) F Polášek	6	6

Quarterfinals
1	(Spain) M Granollers (Argentina) H Zeballos	6	6
(New Zealand) M Daniell (Austria) P Oswald	2	4
3	(Austria) O Marach (Austria) J Melzer	7	6^{4}	[11]
(Brazil) M Demoliner (Netherlands) M Middelkoop	5	7^{7}	[9]
(Australia) M Purcell (Australia) L Saville	2	7^{7}	[8]
4	(United States) A Krajicek (Croatia) F Škugor	6	6^{3}	[10]
(United Kingdom) L Bambridge (Japan) B McLachlan	1	6	[4]
2	(Croatia) I Dodig (Slovakia) F Polášek	6	1	[10]

Semifinals
1	(Spain) M Granollers (Argentina) H Zeballos	6	6
3	(Austria) O Marach (Austria) J Melzer	1	4
4	(United States) A Krajicek (Croatia) F Škugor	6^{4}	7^{7}	[10]
2	(Croatia) I Dodig (Slovakia) F Polášek	7^{7}	6^{1}	[7]

Final
1	(Spain) M Granollers (Argentina) H Zeballos	6^{5}	5
4	(United States) A Krajicek (Croatia) F Škugor	7^{7}	7
