= 2015 Apia International Sydney – Men's singles =

Men's singles
- 2015 Apia International Sydney

Final
- Champion: (Serbia) Viktor Troicki
- Runner-up: (Kazakhstan) Mikhail Kukushkin
- Score: 6–2, 6–3

Details
- Draw: 28
- Seeds: 8

Events
Singles	men	women
Doubles	men	women
← 2014 ·	Sydney International	· 2016 →

Viktor Troicki won the title, defeating Mikhail Kukushkin in the final, 6–2, 6–3. It was the first time in ATP history that two qualifiers contested a final.

Juan Martín del Potro was the defending champion, but lost to Kukushkin in the quarterfinals.

== Seeds ==
The top four seeds receive a bye into the second round.

1. (Italy) Fabio Fognini (second round)
2. (Belgium) David Goffin (second round)
3. (Germany) Philipp Kohlschreiber (second round)
4. (France) Julien Benneteau (quarterfinals)
5. (Argentina) Leonardo Mayer (semifinals)
6. (Uruguay) Pablo Cuevas (second round)
7. (France) Jérémy Chardy (second round)
8. (Slovakia) Martin Kližan (first round)

== Draw ==
=== Key ===
- Q = Qualifier
- WC = Wild card
- LL = Lucky loser
- Alt = Alternate
- SE = Special exempt
- PR = Protected ranking
- ITF = ITF entry
- JE = Junior exempt
- w/o = Walkover
- r = Retired
- d = Defaulted
- SR = Special ranking

=== Finals ===
Semifinals
Q	(Kazakhstan) Mikhail Kukushkin	6	6
5	(Argentina) Leonardo Mayer	4	4
(Luxembourg) Gilles Müller	2	4
Q	(Serbia) Viktor Troicki	6	6

Final
Q	(Kazakhstan) Mikhail Kukushkin	2	3
Q	(Serbia) Viktor Troicki	6	6

=== Top half ===
First round
WC	(Argentina) J M del Potro	6	7^{7}
(Ukraine) S Stakhovsky	3	6^{4}
(Uzbekistan) D Istomin	3	6^{1}
Q	(Kazakhstan) M Kukushkin	6	7^{7}
PR	(Spain) N Almagro	6^{5}	4
6	(Uruguay) P Cuevas	7^{7}	6
(Italy) A Seppi	3	6^{4}
(Canada) V Pospisil	6	7^{7}
(Australia) N Kyrgios	1	7^{8}	6^{5}
(Poland) J Janowicz	6	6^{6}	7^{7}
(Germany) B Becker	6^{3}	2
5	(Argentina) L Mayer	7^{7}	6

Second round
1	(Italy) F Fognini	6	2	2
WC	(Argentina) JM del Potro	4	6	6
Q	(Kazakhstan) M Kukushkin	7	7
6	(Uruguay) P Cuevas	5	5
4	(France) J Benneteau	7^{7}	6
(Canada) V Pospisil	6^{3}	3
(Poland) J Janowicz	6	1	6^{3}
5	(Argentina) L Mayer	4	6	7^{7}

Quarterfinals
WC	(Argentina) JM del Potro	6^{5}	6^{3}
Q	(Kazakhstan) M Kukushkin	7^{7}	7^{7}
4	(France) J Benneteau	3	6^{4}
5	(Argentina) L Mayer	6	7^{7}

Semifinals
Q	(Kazakhstan) M Kukushkin	6	6
5	(Argentina) L Mayer	4	4

=== Bottom half ===
First round
7	(France) J Chardy	6	6
(United States) S Querrey	4	4
WC	(Australia) S Groth	6	3	6^{6}
(Luxembourg) G Müller	3	6	7^{8}
(Australia) B Tomic	6	6
Q	(Netherlands) I Sijsling	1	2
8	(Slovakia) M Kližan	2	3
Q	(Serbia) V Troicki	6	6
(Spain) P Andújar	6	6
Q	(Finland) J Nieminen	2	2
WC	(Australia) M Matosevic	3	2
(Italy) S Bolelli	6	6

Second round
7	(France) J Chardy	6	6^{1}	4
(Luxembourg) G Müller	2	7^{7}	6
(Australia) B Tomic	6	6
3	(Germany) P Kohlschreiber	3	4
Q	(Serbia) V Troicki	4	6	6
(Spain) P Andújar	6	3	3
(Italy) S Bolelli	6	6
2	(Belgium) D Goffin	3	3

Quarterfinals
(Luxembourg) G Müller	7^{7}	7^{15}
(Australia) B Tomic	6^{3}	6^{13}
Q	(Serbia) V Troicki	6	3	7
(Italy) S Bolelli	3	6	5

Semifinals
(Luxembourg) G Müller	2	4
Q	(Serbia) V Troicki	6	6

== Qualifying ==
=== Seeds ===
1. (Ukraine) Sergiy Stakhovsky (moved to main draw)
2. (Russia) Teymuraz Gabashvili (qualifying competition)
3. (Kazakhstan) Mikhail Kukushkin (qualified)
4. (Argentina) Carlos Berlocq (withdrew)
5. (Kazakhstan) Andrey Golubev (second round)
6. (Finland) Jarkko Nieminen (qualified)
7. (Netherlands) Igor Sijsling (qualified)
8. (France) Paul-Henri Mathieu (first round, retired)

=== Qualifiers ===
1. (Netherlands) Igor Sijsling
2. (Finland) Jarkko Nieminen
3. (Kazakhstan) Mikhail Kukushkin
4. (Serbia) Viktor Troicki

=== Qualifying draw ===
==== First qualifier ====
First round
Alt	(France) Jonathan Eysseric	3	4
(Brazil) João Souza	6	6
(France) Édouard Roger-Vasselin	6	5	6
(Australia) Luke Saville	3	7	3
(Germany) Tobias Kamke	6	6
(Italy) Roberto Marcora	2	4
(Chile) Gonzalo Lama	2	4
7	(Netherlands) Igor Sijsling	6	6

Second round
(Brazil) João Souza	4	6	6
(France) Édouard Roger-Vasselin	6	4	3
(Germany) Tobias Kamke	2	5
7	(Netherlands) Igor Sijsling	6	7

Qualifying competition
(Brazil) João Souza	6	6^{6}	4
7	(Netherlands) Igor Sijsling	4	7^{8}	6

==== Second qualifier ====
First round
2	(Russia) Teymuraz Gabashvili	6^{4}	6	6
(Chile) Hans Podlipnik Castillo	7^{7}	1	3
(Argentina) Horacio Zeballos	4	4
(Republic of Ireland) James McGee	6	6
WC	(Australia) Jacob Grills	5	1
(China) Zhang Ze	7	6
WC	(Australia) Matt Reid	6	1	5
6	(Finland) Jarkko Nieminen	4	6	7

Second round
2	(Russia) Teymuraz Gabashvili	6	6
(Republic of Ireland) James McGee	3	4
(China) Zhang Ze	7	3	4
6	(Finland) Jarkko Nieminen	5	6	6

Qualifying competition
2	(Russia) Teymuraz Gabashvili	2	6	4
6	(Finland) Jarkko Nieminen	6	1	6

==== Third qualifier ====
First round
3	(Kazakhstan) Mikhail Kukushkin	6	6
WC	(Australia) Christopher O'Connell	3	3
(United States) Denis Kudla	6	4
(Slovenia) Blaž Kavčič	2	4^{r}
(Italy) Andrea Arnaboldi	6	2	4
(Australia) John-Patrick Smith	4	6	6
(Belgium) Niels Desein	4	6^{5}
5	(Kazakhstan) Andrey Golubev	6	7^{7}

Second round
3	(Kazakhstan) Mikhail Kukushkin	6	6
(United States) Denis Kudla	4	3
(Australia) John-Patrick Smith	6	6^{7}	7^{7}
5	(Kazakhstan) Andrey Golubev	3	7^{9}	6^{5}

Qualifying competition
3	(Kazakhstan) Mikhail Kukushkin	7^{7}	6
(Australia) John-Patrick Smith	6^{4}	3

==== Fourth qualifier ====
First round
Alt	(Australia) Simon Ede	0	4
(Italy) Stefano Travaglia	6	6
(Japan) Yūichi Sugita	3	6	6
WC	(Australia) Blake Mott	6	2	2
(Spain) Enrique López Pérez	3	4
(Serbia) Viktor Troicki	6	6
(Chile) Nicolás Jarry	3	7^{7}	1
8	(France) Paul-Henri Mathieu	6	6^{3}	0^{r}

Second round
(Italy) Stefano Travaglia	6	7
(Japan) Yūichi Sugita	3	5
(Serbia) Viktor Troicki	4	6	6
(Chile) Nicolás Jarry	6	1	4

Qualifying competition
(Italy) Stefano Travaglia	5	3
(Serbia) Viktor Troicki	7	6
