= 2017 Generali Open Kitzbühel =

- Date: 31 July – 6 August
- Edition: 73rd
- Category: World Tour 250 series
- Surface: Clay / outdoor
- Location: Kitzbühel, Austria
- Venue: Tennis stadium Kitzbühel

Champions

Singles
- (Germany) Philipp Kohlschreiber

Doubles
- (Uruguay) Pablo Cuevas / (Argentina) Guillermo Durán
← 2016 ·	Generali Open Kitzbühel	· 2018 →

The 2017 Generali Open Kitzbühel was a men's tennis tournament played on outdoor clay courts. It was the 73rd edition of the Austrian Open Kitzbühel, and part of the World Tour 250 series of the 2017 ATP World Tour. It took place at the Tennis stadium Kitzbühel in Kitzbühel, Austria, from 31 July until 6 August 2017. Unseeded Philipp Kohlschreiber won the singles title.

== Singles main draw entrants ==
=== Seeds ===
Country	Player	Rank^{1}	Seed
URU	Pablo Cuevas	26	1
ITA	Fabio Fognini	31	2
ITA	Paolo Lorenzi	36	3
FRA	Gilles Simon	39	4
NED	Robin Haase	50	5
GER	Jan-Lennard Struff	54	6
CZE	Jiří Veselý	55	7
ARG	Horacio Zeballos	57	8

- ^{1} Rankings are as of July 24, 2017

=== Other entrants ===
The following players received wildcards into the singles main draw:

- (Germany) Tommy Haas
- (Austria) Gerald Melzer
- (Austria) Sebastian Ofner

The following player received entry as a special exempt:

- (Germany) Yannick Hanfmann

The following players received entry from the qualifying draw:

- (Colombia) Santiago Giraldo
- (Argentina) Facundo Bagnis
- (Germany) Maximilian Marterer
- (Serbia) Miljan Zekić

The following player entered as a lucky loser:

- (Brazil) Thiago Monteiro

=== Withdrawals ===
Before the tournament

- (Spain) Nicolás Almagro →replaced by (Argentina) Carlos Berlocq
- (Argentina) Federico Delbonis →replaced by (Brazil) Thiago Monteiro
- (Spain) David Ferrer →replaced by (Russia) Mikhail Youzhny
- (Uzbekistan) Denis Istomin →replaced by (Argentina) Renzo Olivo
- (Slovakia) Martin Kližan →replaced by (Serbia) Dušan Lajović
- (Serbia) Viktor Troicki →replaced by (Russia) Andrey Kuznetsov

== Doubles main draw entrants ==
=== Seeds ===
Country	Player	Country	Player	Rank^{1}	Seed
POL	Marcin Matkowski	SRB	Nenad Zimonjić	77	1
CHI	Julio Peralta	ARG	Horacio Zeballos	78	2
NZL	Marcus Daniell	BRA	Marcelo Demoliner	95	3
URU	Pablo Cuevas	ARG	Guillermo Durán	115	4

- Rankings are as of July 24, 2017

=== Other entrants ===
The following pairs received wildcards into the doubles main draw:

- (Germany) Tommy Haas / (Austria) Sebastian Ofner
- (Austria) Gerald Melzer / (Austria) Tristan-Samuel Weissborn

=== Withdrawals ===
During the tournament

- (Italy) Alessandro Giannessi

== Finals ==
=== Singles ===
- (Germany) Philipp Kohlschreiber defeated (Portugal) João Sousa, 6–3, 6–4

=== Doubles ===
- (Uruguay) Pablo Cuevas / (Argentina) Guillermo Durán defeated (Chile) Hans Podlipnik-Castillo / (Belarus) Andrei Vasilevski 6–4, 4–6, [12–10]
