= 2015 Apia International Sydney – Women's singles =

Women's singles
- 2015 Apia International Sydney

Final
- Champion: (Czech Republic) Petra Kvitová
- Runner-up: (Czech Republic) Karolína Plíšková
- Score: 7–6 ^{(7–5)}, 7–6 ^{(8–6)}

Details
- Draw: 28 (4 Q / 2 WC )
- Seeds: 8

Events
Singles	men	women
Doubles	men	women
- Sydney International

The 2015 Apia International Sydney women's singles was a joint 2015 ATP World Tour and 2015 WTA Tour tennis tournament, played on outdoor hard courts in Sydney, New South Wales, Australia.

Tsvetana Pironkova was the defending champion, but lost in the semifinals to Petra Kvitová. Kvitová won the title by defeating compatriot Karolína Plíšková in the final, 7–6 ^{(7–5)}, 7–6 ^{(8–6)}.

== Seeds ==
The top two seeds received a bye into the second round.

1. (Romania) Simona Halep (withdrew because of gastrointestinal illness)
2. (Czech Republic) Petra Kvitová (champion)
3. (Poland) Agnieszka Radwańska (second round)
4. (Denmark) Caroline Wozniacki (first round, retired because of a left wrist injury)
5. (Germany) Angelique Kerber (semifinals)
6. (Russia) Ekaterina Makarova (second round)
7. (Slovakia) Dominika Cibulková (second round)
8. (Italy) Flavia Pennetta (first round)

== Draw ==
Key

- Q = Qualifier
- WC = Wild card
- LL = Lucky loser
- Alt = Alternate
- ITF = ITF entry
- PR = Protected ranking
- SR = Special ranking
- SE = Special exempt
- JE = Junior exempt
- JR = Junior Accelerator Programme entrant
- CO = College Accelerator Programme entrant
- NG = Next Gen Accelerator Program entrant
- w/o = Walkover
- r = Retired
- d = Defaulted

=== Finals ===
Semifinals
(Czech Republic) Karolína Plíšková	6	6
5	(Germany) Angelique Kerber	3	2
Q	(Bulgaria) Tsvetana Pironkova	5	1
2	(Czech Republic) Petra Kvitová	7	6

Final
(Czech Republic) Karolína Plíšková	6^{5}	6^{6}
2	(Czech Republic) Petra Kvitová	7^{7}	7^{8}

=== Top half ===
First round
Q	(Slovenia) P Hercog	4	4
(Czech Republic) Ka Plíšková	6	6
(Germany) S Lisicki	3	6	6^{4}
(Spain) C Suárez Navarro	6	3	7^{7}
(Ukraine) E Svitolina	6^{1}	2
6	(Russia) E Makarova	7^{7}	6
3	(Poland) A Radwańska	6	6
(France) A Cornet	3	2
(Spain) G Muguruza	6	7
(Italy) S Errani	0	5
WC	(Russia) D Gavrilova	6	6
(Switzerland) B Bencic	3	0
Q	(Ukraine) L Tsurenko	6	4	3
5	(Germany) A Kerber	1	6	6

Second round
LL	(United States) N Gibbs	0	0
(Czech Republic) Ka Plíšková	6	6
(Spain) C Suárez Navarro	4	6	6
6	(Russia) E Makarova	6	1	4
3	(Poland) A Radwańska	6	6^{4}	2
(Spain) G Muguruza	3	7^{7}	6
WC	(Russia) D Gavrilova	7^{8}	6^{2}	3
5	(Germany) A Kerber	6^{6}	7^{7}	6

Quarterfinals
(Czech Republic) Ka Plíšková	4	6	6
(Spain) C Suárez Navarro	6	4	0
(Spain) G Muguruza	6	1	4
5	(Germany) A Kerber	0	6	6

Semifinals
(Czech Republic) Ka Plíšková	6	6
5	(Germany) A Kerber	3	2

=== Bottom half ===
First round
8	(Italy) F Pennetta	3	6^{4}
Q	(Bulgaria) T Pironkova	6	7^{7}
(United States) M Keys	6	6
(Russia) S Kuznetsova	4	4
(Czech Republic) L Šafářová	6^{3}	7	3
(Australia) S Stosur	7^{7}	5	6
(Czech Republic) B Záhlavová-Strýcová	6	1
4	(Denmark) C Wozniacki	4	1^{r}
7	(Slovakia) D Cibulková	6	6
Q	(France) K Mladenovic	2	2
(Germany) A Petkovic	1	6^{5}
WC	(Australia) J Gajdošová	6	7^{7}
(Russia) A Pavlyuchenkova	6	6^{1}	4
(China) S Peng	1	7^{7}	6

Second round
Q	(Bulgaria) T Pironkova	4	4
(United States) M Keys	6	1^{r}
(Australia) S Stosur	6^{1}	2
(Czech Republic) B Záhlavová-Strýcová	7^{7}	6
7	(Slovakia) D Cibulková	6	3	4
WC	(Australia) J Gajdošová	1	6	6
(China) S Peng	1	5
2	(Czech Republic) P Kvitová	6	7

Quarterfinals
Q	(Bulgaria) T Pironkova	6	6
(Czech Republic) B Záhlavová-Strýcová	4	1
WC	(Australia) J Gajdošová	6	3	4
2	(Czech Republic) P Kvitová	4	6	6

Semifinals
Q	(Bulgaria) T Pironkova	5	1
2	(Czech Republic) P Kvitová	7	6

== Qualifying ==
=== Seeds ===
1. (Bulgaria) Tsvetana Pironkova (qualified)
2. (Romania) Irina-Camelia Begu (first round)
3. (Switzerland) Timea Bacsinszky (withdrew, still competing in Shenzhen)
4. (China) Zhang Shuai (first round)
5. (Kazakhstan) Yaroslava Shvedova (first round)
6. (France) Kristina Mladenovic (qualified)
7. (United States) Shelby Rogers (first round)
8. (Slovakia) Anna Schmiedlová (second round)
9. (Belgium) Yanina Wickmayer (first round)

=== Qualifiers ===
1. (Bulgaria) Tsvetana Pironkova
2. (Ukraine) Lesia Tsurenko
3. (Slovenia) Polona Hercog
4. (France) Kristina Mladenovic

=== Lucky loser ===
1. (United States) Nicole Gibbs

=== Draw ===
==== First qualifier ====
First round
1	(Bulgaria) Tsvetana Pironkova	7^{7}	4	6
(South Africa) Chanelle Scheepers	6^{5}	6	2
(Croatia) Donna Vekić	4	6	7^{7}
(Serbia) Jovana Jakšić	6	3	6^{4}
(Germany) Anna-Lena Friedsam	2^{r}
(United States) Nicole Gibbs	5
Alt	(Slovakia) Kristína Kučová	6	4	2
8	(Slovakia) Anna Schmiedlová	4	6	6

Second round
1	(Bulgaria) Tsvetana Pironkova	6	6
(Croatia) Donna Vekić	1	0
(United States) Nicole Gibbs	6	2	7^{8}
8	(Slovakia) Anna Schmiedlová	3	6	6^{6}

Qualifying competition
1	(Bulgaria) Tsvetana Pironkova	6	6
(United States) Nicole Gibbs	3	1

==== Second qualifier ====
First round
2	(Romania) Irina-Camelia Begu	6	4	2
(Japan) Kimiko Date-Krumm	1	6	6
(Italy) Francesca Schiavone	2	0
(Russia) Evgeniya Rodina	6	6
WC	(Australia) Arina Rodionova	2	3
(Switzerland) Stefanie Vögele	6	6
(Ukraine) Lesia Tsurenko	6	6
7	(United States) Shelby Rogers	1	4

Second round
(Japan) Kimiko Date-Krumm	2	3
(Russia) Evgeniya Rodina	6	6
(Switzerland) Stefanie Vögele	6^{6}	4
(Ukraine) Lesia Tsurenko	7^{8}	6

Qualifying competition
(Russia) Evgeniya Rodina	6	3	4
(Ukraine) Lesia Tsurenko	0	6	6

==== Third qualifier ====
First round
5	(Kazakhstan) Yaroslava Shvedova	4	6	6^{2}
(Czech Republic) Kateřina Siniaková	6	4	7^{7}
WC	(Australia) Jessica Moore	2	4
(Slovenia) Polona Hercog	6	6
(New Zealand) Marina Erakovic	6	3	6
WC	(Australia) Olivia Tjandramulia	3	6	0
(Hungary) Tímea Babos	3	6	6
9	(Belgium) Yanina Wickmayer	6	1	2

Second round
(Czech Republic) Kateřina Siniaková	3	3
(Slovenia) Polona Hercog	6	6
(New Zealand) Marina Erakovic	2	4
(Hungary) Tímea Babos	6	6

Qualifying competition
(Slovenia) Polona Hercog	3	7^{7}	6
(Hungary) Tímea Babos	6	6^{5}	2

==== Fourth qualifier ====
First round
4	(China) Zhang Shuai	5	3
(Tunisia) Ons Jabeur	7	6
(Brazil) Teliana Pereira	2	3
Alt	(United Kingdom) Johanna Konta	6	6
WC	(Australia) Sara Tomic	4	2
(Romania) Alexandra Dulgheru	6	6
(Chinese Taipei) Hsieh Su-wei	6	0	2
6	(France) Kristina Mladenovic	2	6	6

Second round
(Tunisia) Ons Jabeur	2	2
Alt	(United Kingdom) Johanna Konta	6	6
(Romania) Alexandra Dulgheru	3	2
6	(France) Kristina Mladenovic	6	6

Qualifying competition
Alt	(United Kingdom) Johanna Konta	3	6	3
6	(France) Kristina Mladenovic	6	3	6
