= 2018 Generali Open Kitzbühel =

- Date: 30 July – 5 August
- Edition: 74th
- Category: World Tour 250 series
- Surface: Clay / outdoor
- Location: Kitzbühel, Austria
- Venue: Tennis stadium Kitzbühel

Champions

Singles
- (Slovakia) Martin Kližan

Doubles
- (Czech Republic) Roman Jebavý / (Argentina) Andrés Molteni
← 2017 ·	Generali Open Kitzbühel	· 2019 →

The 2018 Generali Open Kitzbühel was a men's tennis tournament played on outdoor clay courts. It was the 74th edition of the Austrian Open Kitzbühel, and part of the World Tour 250 series of the 2018 ATP World Tour. It took place at the Tennis stadium Kitzbühel in Kitzbühel, Austria, from July 30 through August 5.

== Singles main draw entrants ==
=== Seeds ===
Country	Player	Rank^{1}	Seed
AUT	Dominic Thiem	8	1
GER	Philipp Kohlschreiber	25	2
ESP	Fernando Verdasco	33	3
NED	Robin Haase	38	4
FRA	Gilles Simon	39	5
GER	Maximilian Marterer	47	6
GER	Jan-Lennard Struff	51	7
SRB	Dušan Lajović	63	8

- ^{1} Rankings are as of July 23, 2018

=== Other entrants ===
The following players received wildcards into the singles main draw:

- (France) Corentin Moutet
- (Austria) Dennis Novak
- (Austria) Sebastian Ofner

The following players received entry into the singles main draw as special exempts:

- (Slovakia) Jozef Kovalík
- (Estonia) Jürgen Zopp

The following players received entry from the qualifying draw:

- (Germany) Yannick Hanfmann
- (Uzbekistan) Denis Istomin
- (Slovakia) Martin Kližan
- (Austria) Jurij Rodionov

=== Withdrawals ===
Before the tournament

- (Uruguay) Pablo Cuevas → replaced by (Moldova) Radu Albot
- (France) Richard Gasquet → replaced by (Japan) Taro Daniel
- (France) Gaël Monfils → replaced by (Spain) Jaume Munar
- (Argentina) Guido Pella → replaced by (Georgia (country)) Nikoloz Basilashvili
- (Spain) Albert Ramos Viñolas → replaced by (Kazakhstan) Mikhail Kukushkin
- (Portugal) João Sousa → replaced by (Serbia) Laslo Đere

== Doubles main draw entrants ==
=== Seeds ===
Country	Player	Country	Player	Rank^{1}	Seed
CHI	Julio Peralta	ARG	Horacio Zeballos	75	1
BLR	Max Mirnyi	AUT	Philipp Oswald	84	2
NZL	Marcus Daniell	NED	Wesley Koolhof	89	3
GER	Tim Pütz	GER	Jan-Lennard Struff	102	4

- Rankings are as of July 23, 2018

=== Other entrants ===
The following pairs received wildcards into the doubles main draw:

- (Austria) Jürgen Melzer / (Germany) Philipp Petzschner
- (Austria) Jurij Rodionov / (Austria) Tristan-Samuel Weissborn

=== Withdrawals ===
During the tournament

- (Austria) Dominic Thiem

=== Retirements ===
- (Germany) Philipp Petzschner

== Finals ==
=== Singles ===
- (Slovakia) Martin Kližan defeated (Uzbekistan) Denis Istomin, 6–2, 6–2

=== Doubles ===
- (Czech Republic) Roman Jebavý / (Argentina) Andrés Molteni defeated (Italy) Daniele Bracciali / (Argentina) Federico Delbonis, 6–2, 6–4
