= 2015 Apia International Sydney =

- Date: 11–17 January 2015
- Edition: 123rd
- Category: ATP World Tour 250 series / WTA Premier
- Draw: 32S / 16D
- Prize money: $494,310 (men) $731,000 (women)
- Surface: Hard
- Location: Sydney, Australia
- Venue: NSW Tennis Centre

Champions

Men's singles
- (Serbia) Viktor Troicki

Women's singles
- (Czech Republic) Petra Kvitová

Men's doubles
- (India) Rohan Bopanna / (Canada) Daniel Nestor

Women's doubles
- (United States) Bethanie Mattek-Sands / (India) Sania Mirza
- Sydney International

The 2015 Apia International Sydney was a joint 2015 ATP World Tour and 2015 WTA Tour tennis tournament, played on outdoor hard courts in Sydney, New South Wales. It was the 123rd edition of the tournament and took place at the NSW Tennis Centre in Sydney, Australia. It was held from 11 January through 17 January 2015 as part of the Australian Open Series in preparation for the first Grand Slam of the year.

== Finals ==
=== Men's singles ===
- (Serbia) Viktor Troicki defeated (Kazakhstan) Mikhail Kukushkin, 6–2, 6–3

=== Women's singles ===
- (Czech Republic) Petra Kvitová defeated (Czech Republic) Karolína Plíšková, 7–6^{(7–5)}, 7–6^{(8–6)}

=== Men's doubles ===
- (India) Rohan Bopanna / (Canada) Daniel Nestor defeated (Netherlands) Jean-Julien Rojer / (Romania) Horia Tecău, 6–4, 7–6^{(7–5)}

=== Women's doubles ===
- (United States) Bethanie Mattek-Sands / (India) Sania Mirza defeated (United States) Raquel Kops-Jones / (United States) Abigail Spears, 6–3, 6–3

== Point distribution ==
Event	W	F	SF	QF	Round of 16	Round of 32	Q	Q3	Q2	Q1
Men's singles	250	150	90	45	20	0	12	6	0	0
Men's doubles	250	150	90	45	0	—N/a	—N/a	—N/a	—N/a	—N/a
Women's singles	470	305	185	100	55	1	25	18	13	1
Women's doubles	470	305	185	100	1	—N/a	—N/a	—N/a	—N/a	—N/a

== Prize money ==
Event	W	F	SF	QF	Round of 16	Round of 32^{1}	Q3	Q2	Q1
Men's singles	$80,000	$42,100	$22,800	$12,990	$7,655	$4,535	$730	$350	—N/a
Men's doubles*	$24,280	$12,760	$6,920	$3,960	$2,320	—N/a	—N/a	—N/a	—N/a
Women's singles	$124,000	$66,000	$35,455	$19,050	$10,220	$5,580	$2,920	$1,555	$860
Women's doubles*	$39,000	$20,650	$11,360	$5,875	$3,140	—N/a	—N/a	—N/a	—N/a

_{^{1}Qualifiers prize money is also the Round of 32 prize money.}
_{*per team}

== ATP singles main-draw entrants ==
=== Seeds ===
Country	Player	Rank^{1}	Seed
ITA	Fabio Fognini	19	1
BEL	David Goffin	22	2
GER	Philipp Kohlschreiber	24	3
FRA	Julien Benneteau	25	4
ARG	Leonardo Mayer	28	5
URU	Pablo Cuevas	29	6
FRA	Jérémy Chardy	31	7
SVK	Martin Kližan	34	8

- ^{1} Rankings as of January 5, 2015

=== Other entrants ===
The following players received wildcards into the singles main draw:

- (Argentina) Juan Martín del Potro
- (Australia) Sam Groth
- (Australia) Marinko Matosevic

The following player received entry using a protected ranking into the singles main draw:

- (Spain) Nicolás Almagro

The following players received entry from the qualifying draw:

- (Kazakhstan) Mikhail Kukushkin
- (Finland) Jarkko Nieminen
- (Netherlands) Igor Sijsling
- (Serbia) Viktor Troicki

=== Withdrawals ===
Before the tournament

- (Spain) Marcel Granollers (knee injury) → replaced by (Italy) Simone Bolelli

== ATP doubles main-draw entrants ==
=== Seeds ===
Country	Player	Country	Player	Rank^{1}	Seed
FRA	Julien Benneteau	FRA	Édouard Roger-Vasselin	12	1
NED	Jean-Julien Rojer	ROU	Horia Tecău	32	2
IND	Rohan Bopanna	CAN	Daniel Nestor	34	3
PAK	Aisam-ul-Haq Qureshi	SRB	Nenad Zimonjić	37	4

- ^{1} Rankings as of January 5, 2015

=== Other entrants ===
The following pairs received wildcards into the doubles main draw:

- (Australia) James Duckworth / (Australia) Chris Guccione
- (Australia) Nick Kyrgios / (Australia) Marinko Matosevic

== WTA singles main-draw entrants ==
=== Seeds ===
Country	Player	Rank^{1}	Seed
~~ROU~~	~~Simona Halep~~	~~3~~	~~1~~
CZE	Petra Kvitová	4	2
POL	Agnieszka Radwańska	6	3
DEN	Caroline Wozniacki	8	4
GER	Angelique Kerber	9	5
RUS	Ekaterina Makarova	10	6
SVK	Dominika Cibulková	11	7
ITA	Flavia Pennetta	12	8

- ^{1} Rankings as of January 12, 2015.

=== Other entrants ===
The following players received wildcards into the singles main draw:

- (Australia) Jarmila Gajdošová
- (Russia) Daria Gavrilova

The following players received entry from the qualifying draw:

- (Slovenia) Polona Hercog
- (France) Kristina Mladenovic
- (Bulgaria) Tsvetana Pironkova
- (Ukraine) Lesia Tsurenko

The following player received entry as a lucky loser:

- (United States) Nicole Gibbs

=== Withdrawals ===
Before the tournament

- (Romania) Simona Halep (gastrointestinal illness) → replaced by Nicole Gibbs

=== Retirements ===
- (Denmark) Caroline Wozniacki (wrist injury)
- (United States) Madison Keys

== WTA doubles main-draw entrants ==
=== Seeds ===
Country	Player	Country	Player	Rank^{1}	Seed
SUI	Martina Hingis	ITA	Flavia Pennetta	23	1
USA	Raquel Kops-Jones	USA	Abigail Spears	24	2
~~ESP~~	~~Garbiñe Muguruza~~	~~ESP~~	~~Carla Suárez Navarro~~	~~33~~	~~3~~
TPE	Chan Hao-ching	CZE	Květa Peschke	37	4

- ^{1} Rankings as of January 12, 2015.

=== Other entrants ===
The following pairs received wildcards into the doubles main draw:

- (Switzerland) Belinda Bencic / (Czech Republic) Lucie Šafářová
- (Slovakia) Dominika Cibulková / (Australia) Jarmila Gajdošová
- (Australia) Arina Rodionova / (Ukraine) Olga Savchuk
