= 2016 Apia International Sydney – Women's singles =

Women's singles
- 2016 Apia International Sydney

Final
- Champion: (Russia) Svetlana Kuznetsova
- Runner-up: (Puerto Rico) Monica Puig
- Score: 6–0, 6–2

Details
- Draw: 28 (4 Q / 3 WC )
- Seeds: 8

Events
Singles	men	women
Doubles	men	women
- Sydney International

Petra Kvitová was the defending champion, but withdrew before her first match due to a gastrointestinal illness.

Svetlana Kuznetsova won the title, defeating Monica Puig in the final, 6–0, 6–2.

== Seeds ==
The top two seeds received a bye into the second round.

1. (Romania) Simona Halep (semifinals)
2. (Poland) Agnieszka Radwańska (withdrew due to left leg injury)
3. (Czech Republic) Petra Kvitová (withdrew due to gastrointestinal illness)
4. (Germany) Angelique Kerber (second round, withdrew)
5. (Czech Republic) Karolína Plíšková (quarterfinals)
6. (Switzerland) Timea Bacsinszky (first round)
7. (Spain) Carla Suárez Navarro (first round)
8. (Switzerland) Belinda Bencic (semifinals, retired)

== Draw ==
Key

- Q = Qualifier
- WC = Wild card
- LL = Lucky loser
- Alt = Alternate
- ITF = ITF entry
- PR = Protected ranking
- SR = Special ranking
- SE = Special exempt
- JE = Junior exempt
- JR = Junior Accelerator Programme entrant
- CO = College Accelerator Programme entrant
- NG = Next Gen Accelerator Program entrant
- w/o = Walkover
- r = Retired
- d = Defaulted

=== Finals ===
Semifinals
1	(Romania) Simona Halep	6^{5}	6	3
(Russia) Svetlana Kuznetsova	7^{7}	4	6
8	(Switzerland) Belinda Bencic	0	0^{r}
Q	(Puerto Rico) Monica Puig	6	0

Final
(Russia) Svetlana Kuznetsova	6	6
Q	(Puerto Rico) Monica Puig	0	2

=== Top half ===
First round
(France) K Mladenovic	6^{4}	4
(France) C Garcia	7^{7}	6
(Russia) A Pavlyuchenkova	6	7^{7}
Q	(Spain) L Arruabarrena	1	6^{1}
WC	(Serbia) A Ivanovic	4	2
5	(Czech Republic) K Plíšková	6	6
LL	(Slovenia) P Hercog	4	3
(Germany) S Lisicki	6	6
WC	(Australia) T Patterson	2	0
(Russia) S Kuznetsova	6	6
(United States) C Vandeweghe	3	4
(Serbia) J Janković	6	6
(Italy) S Errani	6	6
7	(Spain) C Suárez Navarro	3	3

Second round
1	(Romania) S Halep	6	2	6
(France) C Garcia	4	6	1
(Russia) A Pavlyuchenkova	3	0
5	(Czech Republic) K Plíšková	6	6
(Germany) S Lisicki	3	6	2
(Russia) S Kuznetsova	6	3	6
(Serbia) J Janković	6^{3}	6^{8}
(Italy) S Errani	7^{7}	7^{10}

Quarterfinals
1	(Romania) S Halep	6	7
5	(Czech Republic) K Plíšková	4	5
(Russia) S Kuznetsova	7^{7}	6
(Italy) S Errani	6^{1}	0

Semifinals
1	(Romania) S Halep	6^{5}	6	3
(Russia) S Kuznetsova	7^{7}	4	6

=== Bottom half ===
First round
8	(Switzerland) B Bencic	7^{8}	1	6
Q	(Croatia) M Lučić-Baroni	6^{6}	6	4
(Ukraine) L Tsurenko	6^{6}	2
WC	(Bulgaria) T Pironkova	7^{8}	6
LL	(Czech Republic) L Hradecká	2	1
(Russia) E Makarova	6	6
(Ukraine) E Svitolina	6	0	3
4	(Germany) A Kerber	4	6	6
6	(Switzerland) T Bacsinszky	6	1	3
(Slovakia) AK Schmiedlová	1	6	6
Q	(Puerto Rico) M Puig	6	3	6
LL	(Slovakia) M Rybáriková	2	6	4
(Italy) R Vinci	6	5	5
(Australia) S Stosur	4	7	7

Second round
8	(Switzerland) B Bencic	6	6
WC	(Bulgaria) T Pironkova	3	3
(Russia) E Makarova	w/o
4	(Germany) A Kerber
(Slovakia) AK Schmiedlová	1	0
Q	(Puerto Rico) M Puig	6	6
(Australia) S Stosur	6	6
Q	(Slovakia) D Hantuchová	4	2

Quarterfinals
8	(Switzerland) B Bencic	6	2	6
(Russia) E Makarova	0	6	4
Q	(Puerto Rico) M Puig	6	6
(Australia) S Stosur	4	4

Semifinals
8	(Switzerland) B Bencic	0	0^{r}
Q	(Puerto Rico) M Puig	6	0

== Qualifying ==
=== Seeds ===
1. (Belgium) Yanina Wickmayer (second round)
2. (United States) Varvara Lepchenko (withdrew)
3. (Czech Republic) Lucie Hradecká (qualifying competition, lucky loser)
4. (Kazakhstan) Yaroslava Shvedova (first round, retired)
5. (Croatia) Mirjana Lučić-Baroni (qualified)
6. (China) Zheng Saisai (withdrew, still playing in Shenzhen)
7. (Slovenia) Polona Hercog (qualifying competition, lucky loser)
8. (Russia) Daria Kasatkina (second round, retired)
9. (United States) Irina Falconi (second round)
10. (Kazakhstan) Yulia Putintseva (second round)

=== Qualifiers ===
1. (Slovakia) Daniela Hantuchová
2. (Puerto Rico) Monica Puig
3. (Croatia) Mirjana Lučić-Baroni
4. (Spain) Lara Arruabarrena

=== Lucky losers ===
1. (Czech Republic) Lucie Hradecká
2. (Slovenia) Polona Hercog
3. (Slovakia) Magdaléna Rybáriková

=== Draw ===
==== First qualifier ====
First round
1	(Belgium) Yanina Wickmayer	7	3	6
Alt	(Latvia) Anastasija Sevastova	5	6	4
(United States) Lauren Davis	2	6	7^{7}
Alt	(Switzerland) Stefanie Vögele	6	3	6^{4}
(Latvia) Jeļena Ostapenko	4	4
(Slovakia) Daniela Hantuchová	6	6
(United States) Anna Tatishvili	4	2
9	(United States) Irina Falconi	6	6

Second round
1	(Belgium) Yanina Wickmayer	3	6^{3}
(United States) Lauren Davis	6	7^{7}
(Slovakia) Daniela Hantuchová	7	6
9	(United States) Irina Falconi	5	1

Qualifying competition
(United States) Lauren Davis	3	2
(Slovakia) Daniela Hantuchová	6	6

==== Second qualifier ====
First round
10	(Kazakhstan) Yulia Putintseva	6	6
(Belarus) Aliaksandra Sasnovich	1	1
(Puerto Rico) Monica Puig	6	6
(Romania) Andreea Mitu	2	3
(Chinese Taipei) Hsieh Su-wei	4	6	6
(Russia) Elizaveta Kulichkova	6	4	2
WC	(Australia) Olivia Rogowska	3	4
7	(Slovenia) Polona Hercog	6	6

Second round
10	(Kazakhstan) Yulia Putintseva	5	1
(Puerto Rico) Monica Puig	7	6
(Chinese Taipei) Hsieh Su-wei	1	5
7	(Slovenia) Polona Hercog	6	7

Qualifying competition
(Puerto Rico) Monica Puig	2	6	6
7	(Slovenia) Polona Hercog	6	1	1

==== Third qualifier ====
First round
3	(Czech Republic) Lucie Hradecká	6	6
(Poland) Magda Linette	3	3
(Russia) Evgeniya Rodina	2	6	2
(Germany) Laura Siegemund	6	4	6
WC	(Australia) Storm Sanders	4	6	6
Alt	(Romania) Patricia Maria Țig	6	2	3
WC	(Australia) Arina Rodionova	1	4
5	(Croatia) Mirjana Lučić-Baroni	6	6

Second round
3	(Czech Republic) Lucie Hradecká	4	6	7^{7}
(Germany) Laura Siegemund	6	2	6^{3}
WC	(Australia) Storm Sanders	7	3	1
5	(Croatia) Mirjana Lučić-Baroni	5	6	6

Qualifying competition
3	(Czech Republic) Lucie Hradecká	3	3
5	(Croatia) Mirjana Lučić-Baroni	6	6

==== Fourth qualifier ====
First round
4	(Kazakhstan) Yaroslava Shvedova	1^{r}
(Bulgaria) Sesil Karatantcheva	4
(Slovakia) Magdaléna Rybáriková	6	6
(Croatia) Donna Vekić	2	0
WC	(Australia) Olivia Tjandramulia	3	3
(Spain) Lara Arruabarrena	6	6
(Colombia) Mariana Duque Mariño	3	4
8	(Russia) Daria Kasatkina	6	6

Second round
(Bulgaria) Sesil Karatantcheva	2	1
(Slovakia) Magdaléna Rybáriková	6	6
(Spain) Lara Arruabarrena	7	1
8	(Russia) Daria Kasatkina	5	0^{r}

Qualifying competition
(Slovakia) Magdaléna Rybáriková	1	6^{2}
(Spain) Lara Arruabarrena	6	7^{7}
