= 2015 Apia International Sydney – Women's doubles =

Women's doubles
- 2015 Apia International Sydney

Final
- Champions: (United States) Bethanie Mattek-Sands (India) Sania Mirza
- Runners-up: (United States) Raquel Kops-Jones (United States) Abigail Spears
- Score: 6–3, 6–3

Events
Singles	men	women
Doubles	men	women
← 2014 ·	Sydney International	· 2016 →

Tímea Babos and Lucie Šafářová were the defending champions, but chose not to participate together. Babos played alongside Kristina Mladenovic, but lost in the semifinals to Raquel Kops-Jones and Abigail Spears. Šafářová teamed up with Belinda Bencic, but lost in the first round to Kimiko Date-Krumm and Karolína Plíšková.
Bethanie Mattek-Sands and Sania Mirza won the title, defeating Kops-Jones and Spears in the final, 6–3, 6–3.

== Seeds ==
1. (United States) Raquel Kops-Jones / (United States) Abigail Spears (final)
2. (Switzerland) Martina Hingis / (Italy) Flavia Pennetta (quarterfinals)
3. (Spain) Garbiñe Muguruza / (Spain) Carla Suárez Navarro (withdrew)
4. (Chinese Taipei) Chan Hao-ching / (Czech Republic) Květa Peschke (quarterfinals)

== Draw ==
=== Key ===
- Q = Qualifier
- WC = Wild card
- LL = Lucky loser
- Alt = Alternate
- SE = Special exempt
- PR = Protected ranking
- ITF = ITF entry
- JE = Junior exempt
- w/o = Walkover
- r = Retired
- d = Defaulted
- SR = Special ranking

=== Draw ===
First round
1	(United States) R Kops-Jones (United States) A Spears	6	6
WC	(Slovakia) D Cibulková (Australia) J Gajdošová	4	4
WC	(Australia) Ar Rodionova (Ukraine) O Savchuk	4	7	[4]
(Spain) A Medina Garrigues (Kazakhstan) Y Shvedova	6	5	[10]
3	(Spain) G Muguruza (Spain) C Suárez Navarro
(France) C Garcia (Slovenia) K Srebotnik	w/o
(Netherlands) M Krajicek (Czech Republic) B Záhlavová-Strýcová	6	3	[4]
(Hungary) T Babos (France) K Mladenovic	4	6	[10]
(Japan) K Date-Krumm (Czech Republic) Ka Plíšková	6	7^{7}
WC	(Switzerland) B Bencic (Czech Republic) L Šafářová	0	6^{3}
(Russia) A Kudryavtseva (Russia) A Pavlyuchenkova	6	4	[5]
4	(Chinese Taipei) H-c Chan (Czech Republic) K Peschke	4	6	[10]
(New Zealand) M Erakovic (Spain) A Parra Santonja	3	2
(United States) B Mattek-Sands (India) S Mirza	6	6
(Germany) J Görges (Germany) A-L Grönefeld	0	2
2	(Switzerland) M Hingis (Italy) F Pennetta	6	6

Quarterfinals
1	(United States) R Kops-Jones (United States) A Spears	7^{7}	6^{4}	[10]
(Spain) A Medina Garrigues (Kazakhstan) Y Shvedova	6^{2}	7^{7}	[5]
(France) C Garcia (Slovenia) K Srebotnik	6	3	[8]
(Hungary) T Babos (France) K Mladenovic	3	6	[10]
(Japan) K Date-Krumm (Czech Republic) Ka Plíšková	7^{7}	6
4	(Chinese Taipei) H-c Chan (Czech Republic) K Peschke	6^{3}	2
(United States) B Mattek-Sands (India) S Mirza	6	6
2	(Switzerland) M Hingis (Italy) F Pennetta	3	3

Semifinals
1	(United States) R Kops-Jones (United States) A Spears	6^{3}	7^{7}	[10]
(Hungary) T Babos (France) K Mladenovic	7^{7}	6^{2}	[8]
(Japan) K Date-Krumm (Czech Republic) Ka Plíšková	2	1
(United States) B Mattek-Sands (India) S Mirza	6	6

Final
1	(United States) R Kops-Jones (United States) A Spears	3	3
(United States) B Mattek-Sands (India) S Mirza	6	6
