= 2016 Generali Open Kitzbühel – Doubles =

Doubles
- 2016 Generali Open Kitzbühel

Final
- Champions: (Netherlands) Wesley Koolhof (Netherlands) Matwé Middelkoop
- Runners-up: (Austria) Dennis Novak (Austria) Dominic Thiem
- Score: 2–6, 6–3, [11–9]

Events
Singles	Doubles
← 2015 ·	Generali Open Kitzbühel	· 2017 →

Nicolás Almagro and Carlos Berlocq were the defending champions, but Almagro chose not to participate this year and Berlocq chose to compete in Umag instead.

Wesley Koolhof and Matwé Middelkoop won the title, defeating Dennis Novak and Dominic Thiem in the final, 2–6, 6–3, [11–9].

== Seeds ==
1. (Netherlands) Wesley Koolhof / (Netherlands) Matwé Middelkoop (champions)
2. (Argentina) Guillermo Durán / (Argentina) Máximo González (quarterfinals)
3. (Israel) Jonathan Erlich / (Mexico) Santiago González (semifinals)
4. (Belarus) Aliaksandr Bury / (Slovakia) Igor Zelenay (first round)

== Draw ==
=== Key ===
- Q = Qualifier
- WC = Wild card
- LL = Lucky loser
- Alt = Alternate
- SE = Special exempt
- PR = Protected ranking
- ITF = ITF entry
- JE = Junior exempt
- w/o = Walkover
- r = Retired
- d = Defaulted
- SR = Special ranking

=== Draw ===
First round
1	(Netherlands) W Koolhof (Netherlands) M Middelkoop	6	6
Alt	(Japan) T Daniel (Spain) D Gimeno-Traver	3	2
(Germany) G Kretschmer (Germany) J-L Struff	6	6
PR	(Germany) P Marx (Mexico) MÁ Reyes-Varela	3	1
4	(Belarus) A Bury (Slovakia) I Zelenay	6^{12}	5
(Argentina) F Bagnis (Russia) K Khachanov	7^{14}	7
(Spain) Í Cervantes (Poland) M Kowalczyk	3	7^{7}	[6]
(United States) J Cerretani (Austria) P Oswald	6	6^{3}	[10]
(Spain) R Carballés Baena (Argentina) A Molteni	7	4	[10]
(Brazil) R Dutra Silva (Italy) P Lorenzi	5	6	[6]
WC	(Austria) L Miedler (Japan) A Santillan	3	1
3	(Israel) J Erlich (Mexico) S González	6	6
(Austria) J Knowle (Czech Republic) L Rosol	6	6^{3}	[8]
(Austria) D Novak (Austria) D Thiem	1	7^{7}	[10]
PR	(Uruguay) A Behar (United States) JP Fruttero	4	3
2	(Argentina) G Durán (Argentina) M González	6	6

Quarterfinals
1	(Netherlands) W Koolhof (Netherlands) M Middelkoop	7	1	[10]
(Germany) G Kretschmer (Germany) J-L Struff	5	6	[8]
(Argentina) F Bagnis (Russia) K Khachanov	6	6^{4}	[8]
(United States) J Cerretani (Austria) P Oswald	4	7^{7}	[10]
(Spain) R Carballés Baena (Argentina) A Molteni	3	2
3	(Israel) J Erlich (Mexico) S González	6	6
(Austria) D Novak (Austria) D Thiem	2	6	[10]
2	(Argentina) G Durán (Argentina) M González	6	3	[7]

Semifinals
1	(Netherlands) W Koolhof (Netherlands) M Middelkoop	6	6^{6}	[10]
(United States) J Cerretani (Austria) P Oswald	3	7^{8}	[3]
3	(Israel) J Erlich (Mexico) S González	6	6^{3}	[5]
(Austria) D Novak (Austria) D Thiem	1	7^{7}	[10]

Final
1	(Netherlands) W Koolhof (Netherlands) M Middelkoop	2	6	[11]
(Austria) D Novak (Austria) D Thiem	6	3	[9]
