= 2016 Generali Open Kitzbühel =

- Date: 18 – 24 July
- Edition: 72nd
- Category: World Tour 250 series
- Surface: Clay / outdoor
- Location: Kitzbühel, Austria
- Venue: Tennis stadium Kitzbühel

Champions

Singles
- (Italy) Paolo Lorenzi

Doubles
- (Netherlands) Wesley Koolhof / (Netherlands) Matwé Middelkoop
← 2015 ·	Generali Open Kitzbühel	· 2017 →

The 2016 Generali Open Kitzbühel was a men's tennis tournament played on outdoor clay courts. It was the 72nd edition of the Austrian Open Kitzbühel, and part of the World Tour 250 series of the 2016 ATP World Tour. It took place at the Tennis stadium Kitzbühel in Kitzbühel, Austria, from July 18 through July 24.

== Singles main draw entrants ==
=== Seeds ===
Country	Player	Rank^{1}	Seed
AUT	Dominic Thiem	9	1
GER	Philipp Kohlschreiber	22	2
ESP	Marcel Granollers	45	3
ITA	Paolo Lorenzi	48	4
CZE	Lukáš Rosol	78	5
SRB	Dušan Lajović	81	6
ESP	Íñigo Cervantes	82	7
GER	Jan-Lennard Struff	86	8

- ^{1} Rankings are as of July 11, 2016

=== Other entrants ===
The following players received wildcards into the singles main draw:

- (Austria) Jürgen Melzer
- (Austria) Dennis Novak
- (Japan) Akira Santillan

The following players received entry from the qualifying draw:

- (France) Kenny de Schepper
- (Spain) Daniel Gimeno-Traver
- (Argentina) Máximo González
- (Italy) Filippo Volandri

=== Withdrawals ===
Before the tournament

- (Argentina) Diego Schwartzman →replaced by (Germany) Michael Berrer

== Doubles main draw entrants ==
=== Seeds ===
Country	Player	Country	Player	Rank^{1}	Seed
NED	Wesley Koolhof	NED	Matwé Middelkoop	104	1
ARG	Guillermo Durán	ARG	Máximo González	106	2
ISR	Jonathan Erlich	MEX	Santiago González	116	3
BLR	Aliaksandr Bury	SVK	Igor Zelenay	150	4

- Rankings are as of July 11, 2016

=== Other entrants ===
The following pairs received wildcards into the doubles main draw:

- (Austria) Gerald Melzer / (Austria) Jürgen Melzer
- (Austria) Lucas Miedler / (Japan) Akira Santillan

The following pair received entry as alternates:

- (Japan) Taro Daniel / (Spain) Daniel Gimeno-Traver

=== Withdrawals ===
Before the tournament

- (Austria) Gerald Melzer

== Finals ==
=== Singles ===
- (Italy) Paolo Lorenzi defeated (Georgia (country)) Nikoloz Basilashvili, 6–3, 6–4

=== Doubles ===
- (Netherlands) Wesley Koolhof / (Netherlands) Matwé Middelkoop defeated (Austria) Dennis Novak / (Austria) Dominic Thiem, 2–6, 6–3, [11–9]
