= 2016 Apia International Sydney – Women's doubles =

Women's doubles
- 2016 Apia International Sydney

Final
- Champions: (Switzerland) Martina Hingis (India) Sania Mirza
- Runners-up: (France) Caroline Garcia (France) Kristina Mladenovic
- Score: 1–6, 7–5, [10–5]

Events
Singles	men	women
Doubles	men	women
← 2015 ·	Sydney International	· 2017 →

Bethanie Mattek-Sands and Sania Mirza were the defending champions, but Mattek-Sands chose not to participate this year. Mirza played alongside Martina Hingis and successfully defended her title, defeating Caroline Garcia and Kristina Mladenovic in the final, 1–6, 7–5, [10–5].

== Seeds ==
1. (Switzerland) Martina Hingis / (India) Sania Mirza (champions)
2. (Chinese Taipei) Chan Hao-ching / (Chinese Taipei) Chan Yung-jan (semifinals)
3. (France) Caroline Garcia / (France) Kristina Mladenovic (final)
4. (Hungary) Tímea Babos / (Slovenia) Katarina Srebotnik (second round)

== Draw ==
=== Key ===
- Q = Qualifier
- WC = Wild card
- LL = Lucky loser
- Alt = Alternate
- SE = Special exempt
- PR = Protected ranking
- ITF = ITF entry
- JE = Junior exempt
- w/o = Walkover
- r = Retired
- d = Defaulted
- SR = Special ranking

First round
1	(Switzerland) M Hingis (India) S Mirza	6	6
(Australia) An Rodionova (Australia) Ar Rodionova	2	3
(China) C Liang (China) S Peng	w/o
(Germany) J Görges (Czech Republic) L Hradecká
4	(Hungary) T Babos (Slovenia) K Srebotnik	7	6^{0}	[13]
(Canada) G Dabrowski (Poland) A Rosolska	5	7^{7}	[11]
(Romania) R Olaru (Kazakhstan) Y Shvedova	6	6
(Spain) L Arruabarrena (Slovenia) A Klepač	3	2
(Russia) S Kuznetsova (Italy) R Vinci	7^{7}	6
(Slovakia) D Hantuchová (Serbia) J Janković	6^{2}	3
(Chinese Taipei) S-w Hsieh (Georgia (country)) O Kalashnikova	3	7^{7}	[6]
3	(France) C Garcia (France) K Mladenovic	6	6^{3}	[10]
(China) Y Xu (China) S Zheng	7^{7}	2	[2]
(Poland) K Jans-Ignacik (Germany) L Siegemund	6^{4}	6	[10]
(United States) R Atawo (Germany) A-L Grönefeld	5	6	[7]
2	(Chinese Taipei) H-c Chan (Chinese Taipei) Y-j Chan	7	4	[10]

Quarterfinals
1	(Switzerland) M Hingis (India) S Mirza	6	6
(China) C Liang (China) S Peng	2	3
4	(Hungary) T Babos (Slovenia) K Srebotnik	3	2
(Romania) R Olaru (Kazakhstan) Y Shvedova	6	6
(Russia) S Kuznetsova (Italy) R Vinci	4	2
3	(France) C Garcia (France) K Mladenovic	6	6
(Poland) K Jans-Ignacik (Germany) L Siegemund	2	2
2	(Chinese Taipei) H-c Chan (Chinese Taipei) Y-j Chan	6	6

Semifinals
1	(Switzerland) M Hingis (India) S Mirza	4	6	[10]
(Romania) R Olaru (Kazakhstan) Y Shvedova	6	3	[8]
3	(France) C Garcia (France) K Mladenovic	6	6
2	(Chinese Taipei) H-c Chan (Chinese Taipei) Y-j Chan	2	4

Final
1	(Switzerland) M Hingis (India) S Mirza	1	7	[10]
3	(France) C Garcia (France) K Mladenovic	6	5	[5]
