= 2021 Generali Open Kitzbühel – Singles =

Singles
- 2021 Generali Open Kitzbühel

Final
- Champion: (Norway) Casper Ruud
- Runner-up: (Spain) Pedro Martínez
- Score: 6–1, 4–6, 6–3

Details
- Draw: 28
- Seeds: 8

Events
| Singles | Doubles |
- Generali Open Kitzbühel

Miomir Kecmanović was the defending champion, but chose to compete at the Summer Olympics instead.

Casper Ruud won his fifth ATP Tour title, defeating Pedro Martínez in the final, 6–1, 4–6, 6–3. It was Ruud's third consecutive title in as many weeks.

== Seeds ==
The top four seeds received a bye into the second round.

1. (Norway) Casper Ruud (champion)
2. (Spain) Roberto Bautista Agut (second round)
3. (Serbia) Filip Krajinović (quarterfinals)
4. (Spain) Albert Ramos Viñolas (second round)
5. (Argentina) Federico Delbonis (first round)
6. (Serbia) Laslo Đere (first round)
7. (Slovenia) Aljaž Bedene (withdrew)
8. (France) Richard Gasquet (withdrew)
9. (Spain) Jaume Munar (first round)
10. (Spain) Carlos Alcaraz (first round)

== Draw ==
Key

- Q = Qualifier
- WC = Wild card
- LL = Lucky loser
- Alt = Alternate
- ITF = ITF entry
- PR = Protected ranking
- SR = Special ranking
- SE = Special exempt
- JE = Junior exempt
- JR = Junior Accelerator Programme entrant
- CO = College Accelerator Programme entrant
- NG = Next Gen Accelerator Program entrant
- w/o = Walkover
- r = Retired
- d = Defaulted

=== Finals ===
Semifinals
1 | (Norway) Casper Ruud | 6 | 7^{9}
Alt | (France) Arthur Rinderknech | 3 | 6^{7}
SE | (Germany) Daniel Altmaier | 6 | 3 | 3
(Spain) Pedro Martínez | 4 | 6 | 6

Final
1 | (Norway) Casper Ruud | 6 | 4 | 6
(Spain) Pedro Martínez | 1 | 6 | 3

=== Top half ===
First round
LL | (Spain) M Vilella Martínez | 6^{4} | 7 | 6
Q | (Austria) L Neumayer | 7^{7} | 5 | 4
(Uruguay) P Cuevas | 3 | 5
(Sweden) M Ymer | 6 | 7
WC | (Austria) A Erler | 7 | 1 | 6
10 | (Spain) C Alcaraz | 5 | 6 | 2
WC | (Brazil) T Seyboth Wild | 6 | 3 | 2
LL | (Spain) C Taberner | 3 | 6 | 6
(Italy) S Travaglia | 3 | 4
Q | (Denmark) H Rune | 6 | 6
Alt | (France) A Rinderknech | 6 | 6
5 | (Argentina) F Delbonis | 2 | 4

Second round
1 | (Norway) C Ruud | 7 | 5 | 6
LL | (Spain) M Vilella Martínez | 5 | 7 | 4
(Sweden) M Ymer | 6 | 6
WC | (Austria) A Erler | 2 | 3
3 | (Serbia) F Krajinović | 6 | 2 | 6
LL | (Spain) C Taberner | 3 | 6 | 4
Q | (Denmark) H Rune | 4 | 6 | 6^{4}
Alt | (France) A Rinderknech | 6 | 3 | 7^{7}

Quarterfinals
1 | (Norway) C Ruud | 3 | 7^{7} | 6
(Sweden) M Ymer | 6 | 6^{5} | 1
3 | (Serbia) F Krajinović | 4 | 1
Alt | (France) A Rinderknech | 6 | 6

Semifinals
1 | (Norway) C Ruud | 6 | 7^{9}
Alt | (France) A Rinderknech | 3 | 6^{7}

=== Bottom half ===
First round
6 | (Serbia) L Đere | 6 | 3 | 3
SE | (Germany) D Altmaier | 4 | 6 | 6
(Moldova) R Albot | 3 | 6^{7}
(Italy) M Cecchinato | 6 | 7^{9}
(Italy) G Mager | 6 | 6
WC | (Austria) D Novak | 4 | 0
9 | (Spain) J Munar | 4 | 4
Q | (Slovakia) J Kovalík | 6 | 6
(Czech Republic) J Veselý | 6 | 6
Q | (Latvia) E Gulbis | 4 | 1
(France) L Pouille | 3 | 7^{7} | 4
(Spain) P Martínez | 6 | 6^{4} | 6

Second round
SE | (Germany) D Altmaier | 6 | 6
(Italy) M Cecchinato | 4 | 4
(Italy) G Mager | 7^{7} | 1 | 7
4 | (Spain) A Ramos Viñolas | 6^{3} | 6 | 5
Q | (Slovakia) J Kovalík | 2 | 6 | 6
(Czech Republic) J Veselý | 6 | 2 | 4
(Spain) P Martínez | 6 | 6^{5} | 7
2 | (Spain) R Bautista Agut | 4 | 7^{7} | 5

Quarterfinals
SE | (Germany) D Altmaier | 6 | 6^{5} | 6
(Italy) G Mager | 1 | 7^{7} | 3
Q | (Slovakia) J Kovalík | 2 | 2
(Spain) P Martínez | 6 | 6

Semifinals
SE | (Germany) D Altmaier | 6 | 3 | 3
(Spain) P Martínez | 4 | 6 | 6

== Qualifying ==
=== Seeds ===
1. (Spain) Carlos Taberner (qualifying competition, lucky loser)
2. (Slovakia) Andrej Martin (qualifying competition)
3. (Slovakia) Jozef Kovalík (qualified)
4. (Argentina) Juan Ignacio Londero (first round, retired)
5. (Argentina) Juan Manuel Cerúndolo (first round)
6. (Australia) Marc Polmans (first round)
7. (Serbia) Nikola Milojević (first round)
8. (Spain) Mario Vilella Martínez (qualifying competition, lucky loser)

=== Qualifiers ===
1. (Latvia) Ernests Gulbis
2. (Denmark) Holger Rune
3. (Slovakia) Jozef Kovalík
4. (Austria) Lukas Neumayer

=== Lucky losers ===
1. (Spain) Carlos Taberner
2. (Spain) Mario Vilella Martínez

=== Qualifying draw ===
==== First qualifier ====
First round
1 | (Spain) Carlos Taberner | 6 | 7^{7}
(Russia) Evgeny Karlovskiy | 4 | 6^{4}
(Latvia) Ernests Gulbis | 6 | 6
7 | (Serbia) Nikola Milojević | 3 | 4

Qualifying competition
1 | (Spain) Carlos Taberner | 3 | 6 | 3
(Latvia) Ernests Gulbis | 6 | 3 | 6

==== Second qualifier ====
First round
2 | (Slovakia) Andrej Martin | 6 | 6
(Belgium) Zizou Bergs | 4 | 3
(Denmark) Holger Rune | 7^{8} | 6
6 | (Australia) Marc Polmans | 6^{6} | 3

Qualifying competition
2 | (Slovakia) Andrej Martin | 5 | 5
(Denmark) Holger Rune | 7 | 7

==== Third qualifier ====
First round
3 | (Slovakia) Jozef Kovalík | 6 | 6
WC | (Switzerland) Leandro Riedi | 2 | 4
Alt | (Austria) Lucas Miedler | 3 | 4
8 | (Spain) Mario Vilella Martínez | 6 | 6

Qualifying competition
3 | (Slovakia) Jozef Kovalík | 7 | 7
8 | (Spain) Mario Vilella Martínez | 5 | 5

==== Fourth qualifier ====
First round
4 | (Argentina) Juan Ignacio Londero | 6^{7} | 0^{r}
WC | (Austria) Lukas Neumayer | 7^{9} | 0
(Czech Republic) Lukáš Rosol | 6 | 6^{10} | 6
5 | (Argentina) Juan Manuel Cerúndolo | 3 | 7^{12} | 1

Qualifying competition
WC | (Austria) Lukas Neumayer | 6 | 7^{7}
(Czech Republic) Lukáš Rosol | 4 | 6^{5}
