= 2021 Generali Open Kitzbühel =

- Date: 24 – 31 July
- Edition: 77th
- Category: World Tour 250 series
- Surface: Clay / Outdoor
- Location: Kitzbühel, Austria
- Venue: Tennis stadium Kitzbühel

Champions

Singles
- (Norway) Casper Ruud

Doubles
- (Austria) Alexander Erler / (Austria) Lucas Miedler
- Generali Open Kitzbühel

The 2021 Generali Open Kitzbühel is a tennis tournament played on outdoor clay courts. It is the 77th edition of the Austrian Open Kitzbühel, and part of the World Tour 250 series of the 2021 ATP Tour. It will take place at the Tennis stadium Kitzbühel in Kitzbühel, Austria, from 24 through 31 July 2021.

== Champions ==
=== Singles ===
- (Norway) Casper Ruud def. (Spain) Pedro Martínez, 6–1, 4–6, 6–3.

=== Doubles ===
- (Austria) Alexander Erler / (Austria) Lucas Miedler def. (Czech Republic) Roman Jebavý / (Netherlands) Matwé Middelkoop, 7–5, 7–6^{(7–5)}

== Points and prize money ==
=== Point distribution ===
Event	W	F	SF	QF	Round of 16	Round of 32	Q	Q2	Q1
Singles	250	150	90	45	20	0	12	6	0
Doubles	250	150	90	45	0	—N/a	—N/a	—N/a	—N/a

=== Prize money ===
Event	W	F	SF	QF	Round of 16	Round of 32	Q2	Q1
Singles	€41,145	€29,500	€21,000	€14,000	€9,000	€5,415	€2,645	€1,375
Doubles*	€15,360	€11,000	€7,250	€4,710	€2,760	—N/a	—N/a	—N/a

_{*per team}

== Singles main draw entrants ==
=== Seeds ===
Country	Player	Rank^{1}	Seed
NOR	Casper Ruud	14	1
ESP	Roberto Bautista Agut	16	2
SRB	Filip Krajinović	34	3
ESP	Albert Ramos Viñolas	43	4
ARG	Federico Delbonis	46	5
SRB	Laslo Đere	52	6
~~SLO~~	~~Aljaž Bedene~~	~~58~~	~~7~~
~~FRA~~	~~Richard Gasquet~~	~~59~~	~~8~~
ESP	Jaume Munar	67	9
ESP	Carlos Alcaraz	73	10

- ^{1} Rankings as of July 19, 2021.

=== Other entrants ===
The following players received wildcards into the singles main draw:

- (Austria) Alexander Erler
- (Austria) Dennis Novak
- (Brazil) Thiago Seyboth Wild

The following player received entry as an alternate:

- (France) Arthur Rinderknech

The following player received entry as a special exempt:

- (Germany) Daniel Altmaier

The following players received entry from the qualifying draw:

- (Latvia) Ernests Gulbis
- (Slovakia) Jozef Kovalík
- (Austria) Lukas Neumayer
- (Denmark) Holger Rune

The following players received entry as lucky losers:

- (Spain) Carlos Taberner
- (Spain) Mario Vilella Martínez

=== Withdrawals ===
Before the tournament

- (Slovenia) Aljaž Bedene → replaced by (Spain) Carlos Taberner
- (France) Richard Gasquet → replaced by (Spain) Mario Vilella Martínez
- (Serbia) Dušan Lajović → replaced by (France) Arthur Rinderknech
- (France) Corentin Moutet → replaced by (Sweden) Mikael Ymer
- (Italy) Lorenzo Musetti → replaced by (Moldova) Radu Albot
- (France) Jo-Wilfried Tsonga → replaced by (France) Lucas Pouille

== Doubles main draw entrants ==
=== Seeds ===
Country	Player	Country	Player	Rank^{1}	Seed
BIH	Tomislav Brkić	SRB	Nikola Ćaćić	99	1
MON	Hugo Nys	ITA	Andrea Vavassori	131	2
CZE	Roman Jebavý	NED	Matwé Middelkoop	147	3
URU	Ariel Behar	ARG	Guillermo Durán	166	4

- ^{1} Rankings as of July 19, 2021.

=== Other entrants ===
The following pairs received wildcards into the doubles main draw:

- (Austria) Alexander Erler / (Austria) Lucas Miedler
- (Austria) Neil Oberleitner / (Austria) Tristan-Samuel Weissborn

The following pair received entry using a protected ranking:

- (Spain) Marc López / (Spain) Jaume Munar

=== Withdrawals ===
Before the tournament

- (Netherlands) Sander Arends / (Netherlands) David Pel → replaced by (Netherlands) David Pel / (France) Arthur Rinderknech
- (Uruguay) Ariel Behar / (Ecuador) Gonzalo Escobar → replaced by (Uruguay) Ariel Behar / (Argentina) Guillermo Durán
- (Uruguay) Pablo Cuevas / (France) Fabrice Martin → replaced by (Uruguay) Pablo Cuevas / (Brazil) Thiago Seyboth Wild
