= 2019 Generali Open Kitzbühel – Singles =

Singles
- 2019 Generali Open Kitzbühel

Final
- Champion: (Austria) Dominic Thiem
- Runner-up: (Spain) Albert Ramos Viñolas
- Score: 7–6^{(7–0)}, 6–1

Details
- Draw: 28 (4 Q / 3 WC )
- Seeds: 8

Events
Singles	Doubles
- Generali Open Kitzbühel

Martin Kližan was the defending champion but lost in the first round to Matthias Bachinger.

Dominic Thiem won the title, defeating Albert Ramos Viñolas in the final, 7–6^{(7–0)}, 6–1. Thiem was the first local champion of the tournament since Thomas Muster in 1993.

== Seeds ==
The top four seeds receive a bye into the second round.

1. (Austria) Dominic Thiem (champion)
2. (Serbia) Dušan Lajović (second round)
3. (Spain) Fernando Verdasco (quarterfinals)
4. (Uruguay) Pablo Cuevas (quarterfinals)
5. (Hungary) Márton Fucsovics (first round)
6. (Argentina) Leonardo Mayer (first round)
7. (Italy) Lorenzo Sonego (semifinals)
8. (Spain) Pablo Carreño Busta (first round)

== Draw ==
Key

- Q = Qualifier
- WC = Wild card
- LL = Lucky loser
- Alt = Alternate
- ITF = ITF entry
- PR = Protected ranking
- SR = Special ranking
- SE = Special exempt
- JE = Junior exempt
- JR = Junior Accelerator Programme entrant
- CO = College Accelerator Programme entrant
- NG = Next Gen Accelerator Program entrant
- w/o = Walkover
- r = Retired
- d = Defaulted

=== Finals ===
Semifinals
1	(Austria) Dominic Thiem	6	7^{8}
7	(Italy) Lorenzo Sonego	3	6^{6}
(Norway) Casper Ruud	5	4
SE	(Spain) Albert Ramos Viñolas	7	6

Final
1	(Austria) Dominic Thiem	7^{7}	6
SE	(Spain) Albert Ramos Viñolas	6^{0}	1

=== Top half ===
First round
WC	(Austria) S Ofner	7^{7}	7^{7}
Q	(Austria) L Miedler	6^{1}	6^{5}
(Germany) P Kohlschreiber	6	6
(France) R Gasquet	3	2
(Spain) P Andújar	3	6	6
6	(Argentina) L Mayer	6	3	2
PR	(Slovakia) J Kovalík	6^{1}	6	6
Q	(Spain) G García López	7^{7}	2	3
(Spain) R Carballés Baena	3	6	6
Q	(Bolivia) H Dellien	6	3	2
(Argentina) F Delbonis	6^{4}	7^{7}	6^{4}
7	(Italy) L Sonego	7^{7}	6^{4}	7^{7}

Second round
1	(Austria) D Thiem	6	6
WC	(Austria) S Ofner	3	2
(Germany) P Kohlschreiber	4	4
(Spain) P Andújar	6	6
3	(Spain) F Verdasco	6	7^{9}
PR	(Slovakia) J Kovalík	4	6^{7}
(Spain) R Carballés Baena	6	6^{4}	6^{1}
7	(Italy) L Sonego	2	7^{7}	7^{7}

Quarterfinals
1	(Austria) D Thiem	7^{7}	6
(Spain) P Andújar	6^{4}	4
3	(Spain) F Verdasco	4	4
7	(Italy) L Sonego	6	6

Semifinals
1	(Austria) D Thiem	6	7^{8}
7	(Italy) L Sonego	3	6^{6}

=== Bottom half ===
First round
8	(Spain) P Carreño Busta	1	6	1
(Norway) C Ruud	6	3	6
(Slovakia) M Kližan	6^{5}	7^{7}	6^{4}
Q	(Germany) M Bachinger	7^{7}	6^{5}	7^{7}
WC	(Austria) D Novak	6	6
WC	(Austria) J Rodionov	3	4
5	(Hungary) M Fucsovics	7^{8}	4	4
SE	(Spain) A Ramos Viñolas	6^{6}	6	6
SE	(Italy) T Fabbiano	6^{7}	6	1
(Spain) J Munar	7^{9}	1	6
(France) J Chardy	7^{10}	7
(Italy) M Cecchinato	6^{8}	5

Second round
(Norway) C Ruud	6	7^{7}
Q	(Germany) M Bachinger	4	6^{3}
WC	(Austria) D Novak	7^{7}	0	2
4	(Uruguay) P Cuevas	6^{1}	6	6
SE	(Spain) A Ramos Viñolas	6	6
(Spain) J Munar	2	3
(France) J Chardy	3	6	6
2	(Serbia) D Lajović	6	4	3

Quarterfinals
(Norway) C Ruud	6	7^{7}
4	(Uruguay) P Cuevas	3	6^{4}
SE	(Spain) A Ramos Viñolas	6	6
(France) J Chardy	3	4

Semifinals
(Norway) C Ruud	5	4
SE	(Spain) A Ramos Viñolas	7	6

== Qualifying ==
=== Seeds ===
1. (Bolivia) Hugo Dellien (qualified)
2. (Uzbekistan) Denis Istomin (first round)
3. (Germany) Matthias Bachinger (qualified)
4. (Spain) Guillermo García López (qualified)
5. (Croatia) Viktor Galović (first round)
6. (Argentina) Carlos Berlocq (qualifying competition)
7. (France) Elliot Benchetrit (qualifying competition)
8. (Germany) Yannick Hanfmann (qualifying competition)

=== Qualifiers ===
1. (Bolivia) Hugo Dellien
2. (Austria) Lucas Miedler
3. (Germany) Matthias Bachinger
4. (Spain) Guillermo García López

=== Qualifying draw ===
==== First qualifier ====
First round
1	(Bolivia) Hugo Dellien	6	7
(Serbia) Peđa Krstin	3	5
WC	(Austria) Sandro Kopp	7^{11}	4	7^{7}
5	(Croatia) Viktor Galović	6^{9}	6	6^{4}

Qualifying competition
1	(Bolivia) Hugo Dellien	4	6	6
WC	(Austria) Sandro Kopp	6	1	2

==== Second qualifier ====
First round
2	(Uzbekistan) Denis Istomin	1	3
(Austria) Lucas Miedler	6	6
(Serbia) Miljan Zekić	3	2
6	(Argentina) Carlos Berlocq	6	6

Qualifying competition
(Austria) Lucas Miedler	6^{1}	7	6
6	(Argentina) Carlos Berlocq	7^{7}	5	3

==== Third qualifier ====
First round
3	(Germany) Matthias Bachinger	6	6
(Switzerland) Marc-Andrea Hüsler	2	3
Alt	(Chinese Taipei) Hsieh Cheng-peng	1	2
8/PR	(Germany) Yannick Hanfmann	6	6

Qualifying competition
3	(Germany) Matthias Bachinger	6	6
8/PR	(Germany) Yannick Hanfmann	3	4

==== Fourth qualifier ====
First round
4	(Spain) Guillermo García López	6	6
Alt	(Slovakia) Igor Zelenay	3	4
WC	(Austria) Moritz Thiem	6^{4}	0
7	(France) Elliot Benchetrit	7^{7}	6

Qualifying competition
4	(Spain) Guillermo García López	6	7^{7}
7	(France) Elliot Benchetrit	4	6^{4}
