= 2016 Apia International Sydney – Men's doubles =

Men's doubles
- 2016 Apia International Sydney

Final
- Champions: (United Kingdom) Jamie Murray (Brazil) Bruno Soares
- Runners-up: (India) Rohan Bopanna (Romania) Florin Mergea
- Score: 6–3, 7–6^{(8–6)}

Events
Singles	men	women
Doubles	men	women
- Sydney International

Rohan Bopanna and Daniel Nestor were the defending champions, but chose not to compete together. Nestor teamed up with Marcelo Melo, but lost in the quarterfinals to Łukasz Kubot and Marcin Matkowski.

Bopanna played alongside Florin Mergea, but lost in the final to Jamie Murray and Bruno Soares, 3–6, 6–7^{(6–8)}.

== Seeds ==
1. (Netherlands) Jean-Julien Rojer / (Romania) Horia Tecău (first round)
2. (United States) Bob Bryan / (United States) Mike Bryan (first round)
3. (Brazil) Marcelo Melo / (Canada) Daniel Nestor (quarterfinals)
4. (India) Rohan Bopanna / (Romania) Florin Mergea (final)

== Draw ==
Key

- Q = Qualifier
- WC = Wild card
- LL = Lucky loser
- Alt = Alternate
- ITF = ITF entry
- PR = Protected ranking
- SR = Special ranking
- SE = Special exempt
- JE = Junior exempt
- JR = Junior Accelerator Programme entrant
- CO = College Accelerator Programme entrant
- NG = Next Gen Accelerator Program entrant
- w/o = Walkover
- r = Retired
- d = Defaulted

=== Draw ===
First round
1	(Netherlands) J-J Rojer (Romania) H Tecău	6	6^{9}	[4]
WC	(Australia) M Reid (Australia) J Thompson	4	7^{11}	[10]
(United Kingdom) J Murray (Brazil) B Soares	6	5	[11]
WC	(Australia) J Duckworth (Australia) J Millman	4	7	[9]
3	(Brazil) M Melo (Canada) D Nestor	6	6
(France) J Chardy (India) L Paes	4	4
(Poland) Ł Kubot (Poland) M Matkowski	6	7
(Spain) M López (Italy) A Seppi	3	5
(Italy) S Bolelli (Uruguay) P Cuevas	3	3
(Australia) S Groth (Australia) J Peers	6	6
(Uzbekistan) D Istomin (Finland) H Kontinen	7^{7}	3	[8]
4	(India) R Bopanna (Romania) F Mergea	6^{2}	6	[10]
(Brazil) T Bellucci (Argentina) L Mayer	6	3	[10]
Alt	(Russia) T Gabashvili (Kazakhstan) M Kukushkin	4	6	[8]
(Israel) J Erlich (United Kingdom) C Fleming	7	7
2	(United States) B Bryan (United States) M Bryan	5	5

Quarterfinals
WC	(Australia) M Reid (Australia) J Thompson	4	4
(United Kingdom) J Murray (Brazil) B Soares	6	6
3	(Brazil) M Melo (Canada) D Nestor	4	3
(Poland) Ł Kubot (Poland) M Matkowski	6	6
(Australia) S Groth (Australia) J Peers	2	4
4	(India) R Bopanna (Romania) F Mergea	6	6
(Brazil) T Bellucci (Argentina) L Mayer	7^{7}	4	[10]
(Israel) J Erlich (United Kingdom) C Fleming	6^{0}	6	[6]

Semifinals
(United Kingdom) J Murray (Brazil) B Soares	7	2	[10]
(Poland) Ł Kubot (Poland) M Matkowski	5	6	[3]
4	(India) R Bopanna (Romania) F Mergea	7^{10}	6
(Brazil) T Bellucci (Argentina) L Mayer	6^{8}	4

Final
(United Kingdom) J Murray (Brazil) B Soares	6	7^{8}
4	(India) R Bopanna (Romania) F Mergea	3	6^{6}
