= 2016 Apia International Sydney – Men's singles =

Men's singles
- 2016 Apia International Sydney

Final
- Champion: (Serbia) Viktor Troicki
- Runner-up: (Bulgaria) Grigor Dimitrov
- Score: 2–6, 6–1, 7–6^{(9–7)}

Details
- Draw: 28
- Seeds: 8

Events
Singles	men	women
Doubles	men	women
- Sydney International

Viktor Troicki was the defending champion and successfully defended his title, defeating Grigor Dimitrov in the final, 2–6, 6–1, 7–6^{(9–7)}. He saved a championship point in the third-set tiebreak.

== Seeds ==
The top four seeds received a bye into the second round.

1. (Australia) Bernard Tomic (quarterfinals, retired)
2. (Austria) Dominic Thiem (second round, retired)
3. (Serbia) Viktor Troicki (champion)
4. (Bulgaria) Grigor Dimitrov (final)
5. (Italy) Andreas Seppi (second round)
6. (France) Jérémy Chardy (quarterfinals)
7. (Argentina) Leonardo Mayer (first round)
8. (Ukraine) Alexandr Dolgopolov (quarterfinals)

== Draw ==
Key

- Q = Qualifier
- WC = Wild card
- LL = Lucky loser
- Alt = Alternate
- ITF = ITF entry
- PR = Protected ranking
- SR = Special ranking
- SE = Special exempt
- JE = Junior exempt
- JR = Junior Accelerator Programme entrant
- CO = College Accelerator Programme entrant
- NG = Next Gen Accelerator Program entrant
- w/o = Walkover
- r = Retired
- d = Defaulted

=== Finals ===
Semifinals
(Russia) Teymuraz Gabashvili	6	4	4
3	(Serbia) Viktor Troicki	3	6	6
4	(Bulgaria) Grigor Dimitrov	6	7^{7}
(Luxembourg) Gilles Müller	2	6^{4}

Final
3	(Serbia) Viktor Troicki	2	6	7^{9}
4	(Bulgaria) Grigor Dimitrov	6	1	6^{7}

=== Top half ===
First round
WC	(Australia) J Thompson	6	4
(Slovakia) M Kližan	2	0^{r}
(Australia) S Groth	6^{4}	6^{5}
(Argentina) F Delbonis	7^{7}	7^{7}
(Russia) T Gabashvili	6	6
7	(Argentina) L Mayer	4	3
WC	(Australia) J Millman	6^{3}	3
(Spain) T Robredo	7^{7}	6
Q	(France) N Mahut	6	7
(France) A Mannarino	4	5
(Uzbekistan) D Istomin	4	6	2
5	(Italy) A Seppi	6	4	6

Second round
1	(Australia) B Tomic	6	6
WC	(Australia) J Thompson	2	2
(Argentina) F Delbonis	3	3
(Russia) T Gabashvili	6	6
3	(Serbia) V Troicki	6	6
(Spain) T Robredo	1	4
Q	(France) N Mahut	6	1	6
5	(Italy) A Seppi	3	6	3

Quarterfinals
1	(Australia) B Tomic	3	0^{r}
(Russia) T Gabashvili	6	3
3	(Serbia) V Troicki	4	6	6
Q	(France) N Mahut	6	3	3

Semifinals
(Russia) T Gabashvili	6	4	4
3	(Serbia) V Troicki	3	6	6

=== Bottom half ===
First round
8	(Ukraine) A Dolgopolov	6	6
(Brazil) T Bellucci	1	4
Q	(United States) A Sarkissian	6	7^{7}
(Italy) S Bolelli	2	6^{5}
(Uruguay) P Cuevas	6	6
Q	(Germany) M Marterer	4	4
6	(France) J Chardy	6	6
Q	(Kazakhstan) M Kukushkin	2	3
LL	(Spain) I Cervantes	3	2
WC	(Australia) J Duckworth	6	6
(Croatia) B Ćorić	1	4
(Luxembourg) G Müller	6	6

Second round
8	(Ukraine) A Dolgopolov	7^{8}	6
Q	(United States) A Sarkissian	6^{6}	2
(Uruguay) P Cuevas	6^{2}	4
4	(Bulgaria) G Dimitrov	7^{7}	6
6	(France) J Chardy	7^{7}	6
WC	(Australia) J Duckworth	6^{5}	4
(Luxembourg) G Müller	7^{7}	2
2	(Austria) D Thiem	6^{2}	2^{r}

Quarterfinals
8	(Ukraine) A Dolgopolov	6	3	4
4	(Bulgaria) G Dimitrov	4	6	6
6	(France) J Chardy	6^{5}	3
(Luxembourg) G Müller	7^{7}	6

Semifinals
4	(Bulgaria) G Dimitrov	6	7^{7}
(Luxembourg) G Müller	2	6^{4}

== Qualifying ==
=== Seeds ===
1. (Uzbekistan) Denis Istomin (moved to main draw)
2. (Ukraine) Sergiy Stakhovsky (first round)
3. (Kazakhstan) Mikhail Kukushkin (qualified)
4. (France) Nicolas Mahut (qualified)
5. (Spain) Íñigo Cervantes (qualifying competition, lucky loser)
6. (Serbia) Dušan Lajović (qualifying competition)
7. (Latvia) Ernests Gulbis (first round)
8. (Bosnia and Herzegovina) Damir Džumhur (first round)

=== Qualifiers ===
1. (United States) Alexander Sarkissian
2. (Germany) Maximilian Marterer
3. (Kazakhstan) Mikhail Kukushkin
4. (France) Nicolas Mahut

=== Lucky losers ===
1. (Spain) Íñigo Cervantes

=== Draw ===
==== First qualifier ====
First round
Alt	(Australia) Blade Fong	1	2
(Poland) Łukasz Kubot	6	6
(United States) Alexander Sarkissian	6	7
7	(Latvia) Ernests Gulbis	3	5

Qualifying competition
(Poland) Łukasz Kubot	3	3
(United States) Alexander Sarkissian	6	6

==== Second qualifier ====
First round
2	(Ukraine) Sergiy Stakhovsky	6	3	4
WC	(Australia) Aleksandar Vukic	3	6	6
(Germany) Maximilian Marterer	7	1	7^{7}
8	(Bosnia and Herzegovina) Damir Džumhur	5	6	6^{2}

Qualifying competition
WC	(Australia) Aleksandar Vukic	1	6^{7}
(Germany) Maximilian Marterer	6	7^{9}

==== Third qualifier ====
First round
3	(Kazakhstan) Mikhail Kukushkin	6^{2}	6	7^{7}
(Australia) Matt Reid	7^{7}	4	6^{5}
(Australia) Luke Saville	4	4
5	(Spain) Íñigo Cervantes	6	6

Qualifying competition
3	(Kazakhstan) Mikhail Kukushkin	3	6	7^{8}
5	(Spain) Íñigo Cervantes	6	4	6^{6}

==== Fourth qualifier ====
First round
4	(France) Nicolas Mahut	6	6
(Italy) Marco Cecchinato	1	3
WC	(Australia) Mayez Elrich	2	1
6	(Serbia) Dušan Lajović	6	6

Qualifying competition
4	(France) Nicolas Mahut	7^{7}	3	6
6	(Serbia) Dušan Lajović	6^{4}	6	2
