= 2018 Generali Open Kitzbühel – Doubles =

Doubles
- 2018 Generali Open Kitzbühel

Final
- Champions: (Czech Republic) Roman Jebavý (Argentina) Andrés Molteni
- Runners-up: (Italy) Daniele Bracciali (Argentina) Federico Delbonis
- Score: 6–2, 6–4

Events
Singles	Doubles
- Generali Open Kitzbühel

Pablo Cuevas and Guillermo Durán were the defending champions, but chose not to participate this year.

Roman Jebavý and Andrés Molteni won the title, defeating Daniele Bracciali and Federico Delbonis in the final, 6–2, 6–4.

== Seeds ==
1. (Chile) Julio Peralta / (Argentina) Horacio Zeballos (quarterfinals)
2. (Belarus) Max Mirnyi / (Austria) Philipp Oswald (quarterfinals)
3. (New Zealand) Marcus Daniell / (Netherlands) Wesley Koolhof (first round)
4. (Germany) Tim Pütz / (Germany) Jan-Lennard Struff (semifinals)

== Draw ==
Key

- Q = Qualifier
- WC = Wild card
- LL = Lucky loser
- Alt = Alternate
- ITF = ITF entry
- PR = Protected ranking
- SR = Special ranking
- SE = Special exempt
- JE = Junior exempt
- JR = Junior Accelerator Programme entrant
- CO = College Accelerator Programme entrant
- NG = Next Gen Accelerator Program entrant
- w/o = Walkover
- r = Retired
- d = Defaulted

=== Draw ===
First round
1	(Chile) J Peralta (Argentina) H Zeballos	6	7
(Germany) K Krawietz (Chile) H Podlipnik-Castillo	3	5
(Netherlands) S Arends (Croatia) A Šančić	2	4
(Czech Republic) R Jebavý (Argentina) A Molteni	6	6
4	(Germany) T Pütz (Germany) J-L Struff	6	6
(France) H Nys (Belarus) A Vasilevski	4	4
(France) J Eysseric (Chile) N Jarry	6	6
(Uruguay) A Behar (Spain) G García López	3	4
(Spain) R Carballés Baena (Spain) J Munar	6	6^{4}	[7]
(Austria) D Novak (Austria) D Thiem	4	7^{7}	[10]
WC	(Austria) J Melzer (Germany) P Petzschner	7^{7}	6
3	(New Zealand) M Daniell (Netherlands) W Koolhof	6^{4}	4
WC	(Austria) J Rodionov (Austria) T-S Weissborn	5	3
PR	(Italy) D Bracciali (Argentina) F Delbonis	7	6
(Ukraine) D Molchanov (Slovakia) I Zelenay	6^{7}	6^{4}
2	(Belarus) M Mirnyi (Austria) P Oswald	7^{9}	7^{7}

Quarterfinals
1	(Chile) J Peralta (Argentina) H Zeballos	3	5
(Czech Republic) R Jebavý (Argentina) A Molteni	6	7
4	(Germany) T Pütz (Germany) J-L Struff	7	6
(France) J Eysseric (Chile) N Jarry	5	4
(Austria) D Novak (Austria) D Thiem
WC	(Austria) J Melzer (Germany) P Petzschner	w/o
PR	(Italy) D Bracciali (Argentina) F Delbonis	7	4	[10]
2	(Belarus) M Mirnyi (Austria) P Oswald	5	6	[8]

Semifinals
(Czech Republic) R Jebavý (Argentina) A Molteni	7^{7}	6
4	(Germany) T Pütz (Germany) J-L Struff	6^{4}	3
WC	(Austria) J Melzer (Germany) P Petzschner	2	0^{r}
PR	(Italy) D Bracciali (Argentina) F Delbonis	6	3

Final
(Czech Republic) R Jebavý (Argentina) A Molteni	6	6
PR	(Italy) D Bracciali (Argentina) F Delbonis	2	4
