= 2017 Generali Open Kitzbühel – Singles =

Singles
- 2017 Generali Open Kitzbühel

Final
- Champion: (Germany) Philipp Kohlschreiber
- Runner-up: (Portugal) João Sousa
- Score: 6–3, 6–4

Details
- Draw: 28 (4 Q / 3 WC )
- Seeds: 8

Events
Singles	Doubles
- Generali Open Kitzbühel

Paolo Lorenzi was the defending champion, but lost in the second round to João Sousa.

Philipp Kohlschreiber won the title, defeating Sousa in the final, 6–3, 6–4.

This tournament marked the final professional appearance of former world No. 2 Tommy Haas; he lost in the first round to Jan-Lennard Struff.

== Seeds ==
The top four seeds receive a bye into the second round.

1. (Uruguay) Pablo Cuevas (second round)
2. (Italy) Fabio Fognini (semifinals)
3. (Italy) Paolo Lorenzi (second round)
4. (France) Gilles Simon (second round)
5. (Netherlands) Robin Haase (first round)
6. (Germany) Jan-Lennard Struff (second round)
7. (Czech Republic) Jiří Veselý (second round)
8. (Argentina) Horacio Zeballos (second round)

== Draw ==
Key

- Q = Qualifier
- WC = Wild card
- LL = Lucky loser
- Alt = Alternate
- ITF = ITF entry
- PR = Protected ranking
- SR = Special ranking
- SE = Special exempt
- JE = Junior exempt
- JR = Junior Accelerator Programme entrant
- CO = College Accelerator Programme entrant
- NG = Next Gen Accelerator Program entrant
- w/o = Walkover
- r = Retired
- d = Defaulted

=== Finals ===
Semifinals
WC	(Austria) Sebastian Ofner	6^{4}	6^{4}
(Portugal) João Sousa	7^{7}	7^{7}
(Germany) Philipp Kohlschreiber	7	6
2	(Italy) Fabio Fognini	5	3

Final
(Portugal) João Sousa	3	4
(Germany) Philipp Kohlschreiber	6	6

=== Top half ===
First round
(Georgia (country)) N Basilashvili	5	0^{r}
WC	(Austria) S Ofner	7	3
(Argentina) R Olivo	7	6
LL	(Brazil) T Monteiro	5	2
(Brazil) R Dutra Silva	6	6^{11}	6^{4}
8	(Argentina) H Zeballos	2	7^{13}	7^{7}
(Portugal) J Sousa	6^{4}	7	6
(Russia) M Youzhny	7^{7}	5	3
(Argentina) C Berlocq	4	7	3
WC	(Austria) G Melzer	6	5	6
Q	(Colombia) S Giraldo	7^{8}	4	6
5	(Netherlands) R Haase	6^{6}	6	4

Second round
1	(Uruguay) P Cuevas	3	6	6^{3}
WC	(Austria) S Ofner	6	2	7^{7}
(Argentina) R Olivo	7^{7}	6
8	(Argentina) H Zeballos	6^{4}	2
3	(Italy) P Lorenzi	7^{7}	4	1
(Portugal) J Sousa	6^{5}	6	6
WC	(Austria) G Melzer	6	7^{7}
Q	(Colombia) S Giraldo	3	6^{1}

Quarterfinals
WC	(Austria) S Ofner	6	1	6
(Argentina) R Olivo	3	6	3
(Portugal) J Sousa	2	6	6
WC	(Austria) G Melzer	6	1	3

Semifinals
WC	(Austria) S Ofner	6^{4}	6^{4}
(Portugal) J Sousa	7^{7}	7^{7}

=== Bottom half ===
First round
7	(Czech Republic) J Veselý	6	6
SE	(Germany) Y Hanfmann	4	4
(Germany) P Kohlschreiber	7	3	6
Q	(Argentina) F Bagnis	5	6	3
Q	(Germany) M Marterer	5	6^{4}
(Serbia) D Lajović	7	7^{7}
6	(Germany) J-L Struff	6	7^{7}
WC	(Germany) T Haas	3	6^{4}
(Brazil) T Bellucci	6	5	6
(Ukraine) A Dolgopolov	2	7	4
(Russia) A Kuznetsov	6^{4}	6^{6}
Q	(Serbia) M Zekić	7^{7}	7^{8}

Second round
7	(Czech Republic) J Veselý	3	3
(Germany) P Kohlschreiber	6	6
(Serbia) D Lajović	6	6
4	(France) G Simon	4	4
6	(Germany) J-L Struff	4	6^{3}
(Brazil) T Bellucci	6	7^{7}
Q	(Serbia) M Zekić	4	4
2	(Italy) F Fognini	6	6

Quarterfinals
(Germany) P Kohlschreiber	4	6	7^{7}
(Serbia) D Lajović	6	4	6^{5}
(Brazil) T Bellucci	3	1
2	(Italy) F Fognini	6	6

Semifinals
(Germany) P Kohlschreiber	7	6
2	(Italy) F Fognini	5	3

== Qualifying ==
=== Seeds ===
1. (Italy) Alessandro Giannessi (first round)
2. (Colombia) Santiago Giraldo (qualified)
3. (Poland) Jerzy Janowicz (first round)
4. (Argentina) Facundo Bagnis (qualified)
5. (Brazil) Thiago Monteiro (qualifying competition, Lucky loser)
6. (Germany) Maximilian Marterer (qualified)
7. (Slovakia) Jozef Kovalík (qualifying competition)
8. (Greece) Stefanos Tsitsipas (qualifying competition)

=== Qualifiers ===
1. (Serbia) Miljan Zekić
2. (Colombia) Santiago Giraldo
3. (Germany) Maximilian Marterer
4. (Argentina) Facundo Bagnis

=== Lucky loser ===
1. (Brazil) Thiago Monteiro

==== First qualifier ====
First round
1	(Italy) Alessandro Giannessi	6	5	4
(Serbia) Miljan Zekić	3	7	6
(Egypt) Mohamed Safwat	3	6^{4}
8	(Greece) Stefanos Tsitsipas	6	7^{7}

Qualifying competition
(Serbia) Miljan Zekić	7^{7}	7^{7}
8	(Greece) Stefanos Tsitsipas	6^{4}	6^{3}

==== Second qualifier ====
First round
2	(Colombia) Santiago Giraldo	6	6
WC	(Austria) Lenny Hampel	1	2
(Portugal) Gastão Elias	1	7	4
7	(Slovakia) Jozef Kovalík	6	5	6

Qualifying competition
2	(Colombia) Santiago Giraldo	7	6
7	(Slovakia) Jozef Kovalík	5	4

==== Third qualifier ====
First round
3	(Poland) Jerzy Janowicz	1	4
(Austria) Michael Linzer	6	6
WC	(Austria) Jurij Rodionov	6^{5}	1
6	(Germany) Maximilian Marterer	7^{7}	6

Qualifying competition
(Austria) Michael Linzer	2	4
6	(Germany) Maximilian Marterer	6	6

==== Fourth qualifier ====
First round
4	(Argentina) Facundo Bagnis	6	2	6
(Poland) Hubert Hurkacz	3	6	1
(France) Paul-Henri Mathieu	2	1
5	(Brazil) Thiago Monteiro	6	6

Qualifying competition
4	(Argentina) Facundo Bagnis	3	6	6
5	(Brazil) Thiago Monteiro	6	4	3
