= 2014 Apia International Sydney =

- Date: 5–11 January 2014
- Edition: 122nd
- Location: Sydney
- Venue: NSW Tennis Centre

Champions

Men's singles
- (Argentina) Juan Martín del Potro

Women's singles
- (Bulgaria) Tsvetana Pironkova

Men's doubles
- (Canada) Daniel Nestor / (Serbia) Nenad Zimonjić

Women's doubles
- (Hungary) Tímea Babos / (Czech Republic) Lucie Šafářová
- Sydney International

The 2014 Apia International Sydney was a joint 2014 ATP World Tour and 2014 WTA Tour tennis tournament, played on outdoor hard courts in Sydney, New South Wales. It was the 122nd edition of the tournament and took place at the NSW Tennis Centre in Sydney, Australia. It was held from 5 to 11 January 2014. It was part of the Australian Open Series in preparation for the first Grand Slam of the year.

Women's singles defending champion, Agnieszka Radwańska and ATP players, Juan Martín del Potro, Jerzy Janowicz and Bernard Tomic announced their participation in the event.

== Point distribution ==
Event	W	F	SF	QF	Round of 16	Round of 32	Q	Q3	Q2	Q1
Men's singles	250	150	90	45	20	0	12	6	0	0
Men's doubles	250	150	90	45	0	—N/a	—N/a	—N/a	—N/a	—N/a
Women's singles	470	305	185	100	55	1	25	18	13	1
Women's doubles	470	305	185	100	1	—N/a	—N/a	—N/a	—N/a	—N/a

== Prize money ==
Event	W	F	SF	QF	Round of 16	Round of 32^{1}	Q3	Q2	Q1
Men's singles	$82,040	$43,210	$23,405	$13,335	$7,860	$4,655	$750	$360	—N/a
Men's doubles *	$24,920	$13,100	$7,100	$4,060	$2,380	—N/a	—N/a	—N/a	—N/a
Women's singles	$120,000	$64,000	$33,865	$18,220	$9,700	$5,385	$2,210	$1,010	$635
Women's doubles *	$38,000	$20,000	$11,000	$5,600	$3,035	—N/a	—N/a	—N/a	—N/a

_{^{1} Qualifiers prize money is also the Round of 32 prize money}
_{* per team}

== Broadcast ==
In Australia, all matches were broadcast live on 7Two. The men's final was also due to air on 7Two, however it was moved to Channel Seven (7Two's parent channel) when Australian Bernard Tomic made the final match. A movie which was due to air on Channel Seven was swapped to 7Two. Day coverage was hosted by Ryan Phelan while night coverage was hosted by Matt White.

== ATP singles main-draw entrants ==
=== Seeds ===
Country	Player	Rank^{1}	Seed
ARG	Juan Martín del Potro	5	1
POL	Jerzy Janowicz	21	2
ITA	Andreas Seppi	25	3
RUS	Dmitry Tursunov	29	4
FRA	Julien Benneteau	35	5
CRO	Marin Čilić	37	6
ESP	Marcel Granollers	38	7
FIN	Jarkko Nieminen	39	8

- ^{1} Rankings as of 30 December 2013.

=== Other entrants ===
The following players received wildcards into the singles main draw:

- (Australia) Marinko Matosevic
- (Australia) Matthew Ebden
- (Australia) Samuel Groth

The following players received entry from the qualifying draw:

- (Germany) Jan-Lennard Struff
- (Slovenia) Blaž Kavčič
- (United States) Ryan Harrison
- (Ukraine) Sergiy Stakhovsky

The following players received entry into a lucky loser spot:

- (Spain) Albert Ramos

=== Withdrawals ===
Before the tournament

- (Spain) Nicolás Almagro → replaced by (Australia) Bernard Tomic
- (Italy) Fabio Fognini (left leg strain) → replaced by (France) Nicolas Mahut
- (Canada) Vasek Pospisil (lower back injury) → replaced by (Spain) Albert Ramos

=== Retirements ===
- (France) Édouard Roger-Vasselin (fatigue)

== ATP doubles main-draw entrants ==
=== Seeds ===
Country	Player	Country	Player	Rank^{1}	Seed
USA	Bob Bryan	USA	Mike Bryan	1	1
IND	Leander Paes	CZE	Radek Štěpánek	19	2
IND	Rohan Bopanna	PAK	Aisam-ul-Haq Qureshi	28	3
POL	Mariusz Fyrstenberg	POL	Marcin Matkowski	38	4

- ^{1} Rankings as of 30 December 2013.

=== Other entrants ===
The following pairs received wildcards into the doubles main draw:

- (Australia) James Duckworth / (Australia) Samuel Groth

The following pair received entry as alternates:

- (Russia) Mikhail Elgin / (Uzbekistan) Denis Istomin

=== Withdrawals ===
Before the tournament

- (Australia) Matthew Ebden (left ankle injury)

== WTA singles main-draw entrants ==
=== Seeds ===
Country	Player	Rank^{1}	Seed
POL	Agnieszka Radwańska	5	1
CZE	Petra Kvitová	6	2
ITA	Sara Errani	7	3
SRB	Jelena Janković	8	4
GER	Angelique Kerber	9	5
DEN	Caroline Wozniacki	10	6
ROU	Simona Halep	11	7
USA	Sloane Stephens	12	8

- ^{1} Rankings as of 30 December 2013.

=== Other entrants ===
The following players received wildcards into the singles main draw:

- (Australia) Jarmila Gajdošová
- (Croatia) Ajla Tomljanović

The following players received entry from the qualifying draw:

- (United States) Lauren Davis
- (United States) Victoria Duval
- (United States) Bethanie Mattek-Sands
- (United States) Christina McHale
- (Argentina) Paula Ormaechea
- (Bulgaria) Tsvetana Pironkova

The following players received entry as lucky losers:

- (Germany) Julia Görges
- (United States) Varvara Lepchenko

=== Withdrawals ===
Before the tournament

- (United States) Jamie Hampton (hip injury) → replaced by (Germany) Julia Görges
- (United States) Sloane Stephens (wrist injury) → replaced by (United States) Varvara Lepchenko

=== Retirements ===
- (United States) Bethanie Mattek-Sands (lumbar spine injury)

== WTA doubles main-draw entrants ==
=== Seeds ===
Country	Player	Country	Player	Rank^{1}	Seed
ITA	Sara Errani	ITA	Roberta Vinci	2	1
CZE	Květa Peschke	SLO	Katarina Srebotnik	22	2
ZIM	Cara Black	IND	Sania Mirza	22	3
USA	Raquel Kops-Jones	USA	Abigail Spears	46	4

- ^{1} Rankings as of 30 December 2013.

=== Other entrants ===
The following pairs received wildcards into the doubles main draw:

- (Romania) Simona Halep / (Romania) Raluca Olaru
- (Australia) Jarmila Gajdošová / (Croatia) Ajla Tomljanović

== Finals ==
=== Men's singles ===
- (Argentina) Juan Martín del Potro defeated (Australia) Bernard Tomic 6–3, 6–1

=== Women's singles ===
- (Bulgaria) Tsvetana Pironkova defeated (Germany) Angelique Kerber, 6–4, 6–4

=== Men's doubles ===
- (Canada) Daniel Nestor / (Serbia) Nenad Zimonjić defeated (India) Rohan Bopanna / (Pakistan) Aisam-ul-Haq Qureshi 7–6^{(7–3)}, 7–6^{(7–3)}

=== Women's doubles ===
- (Hungary) Tímea Babos / (Czech Republic) Lucie Šafářová defeated (Italy) Sara Errani / (Italy) Roberta Vinci, 7–5, 3–6, [10–7]
