= 2014 Apia International Sydney – Women's doubles =

Women's doubles
- 2014 Apia International Sydney

Final
- Champions: (Hungary) Tímea Babos (Czech Republic) Lucie Šafářová
- Runners-up: (Italy) Sara Errani (Italy) Roberta Vinci
- Score: 7–5, 3–6, [10–7]

Events
Singles	men	women
Doubles	men	women
← 2013 ·	Sydney International	· 2015 →

Nadia Petrova and Katarina Srebotnik were the defending champions but Petrova chose not to participate. Srebotnik partnered up with Květa Peschke, but they lost in the quarterfinals to Tímea Babos and Lucie Šafářová.
Babos and Šafářová went on to win the title, defeating Sara Errani and Roberta Vinci in the final, 7–5, 3–6, [10–7].

== Seeds ==
1. (Italy) Sara Errani / (Italy) Roberta Vinci (final)
2. (Czech Republic) Květa Peschke / (Slovenia) Katarina Srebotnik (quarterfinals)
3. (Zimbabwe) Cara Black / (India) Sania Mirza (first round)
4. (United States) Raquel Kops-Jones / (United States) Abigail Spears (semifinals)

== Draw ==
=== Key ===
- Q = Qualifier
- WC = Wild card
- LL = Lucky loser
- Alt = Alternate
- SE = Special exempt
- PR = Protected ranking
- ITF = ITF entry
- JE = Junior exempt
- w/o = Walkover
- r = Retired
- d = Defaulted
- SR = Special ranking

=== Draw ===
First round
1	(Italy) S Errani (Italy) R Vinci	7	6
(Germany) A-L Grönefeld (Croatia) M Lučić-Baroni	5	2
(Chinese Taipei) H-c Chan (United States) L Huber	6	6
(United States) V Lepchenko (Kazakhstan) G Voskoboeva	3	4
4	(United States) R Kops-Jones (United States) A Spears	6	7
(Russia) S Kuznetsova (Russia) E Makarova	2	5
(Croatia) D Jurak (United States) M Moulton-Levy	6	6^{6}	1
(Slovakia) D Hantuchová (Spain) A Parra Santonja	2	7^{8}	10
(Germany) J Görges (Czech Republic) B Záhlavová-Strýcová	6	7
(Spain) A Medina Garrigues (Kazakhstan) Y Shvedova	4	5
WC	(Australia) J Gajdošová (Croatia) A Tomljanović	6	6
3	(Zimbabwe) C Black (India) S Mirza	3	2
WC	(Romania) S Halep (Romania) R Olaru	5	2
(Hungary) T Babos (Czech Republic) L Šafářová	7	6
(Japan) K Date-Krumm (Poland) A Rosolska	5	4
2	(Czech Republic) K Peschke (Slovenia) K Srebotnik	7	6

Quarterfinals
1	(Italy) S Errani (Italy) R Vinci	6	6
(Chinese Taipei) H-c Chan (United States) L Huber	3	2
4	(United States) R Kops-Jones (United States) A Spears	6	4	[10]
(Slovakia) D Hantuchová (Spain) A Parra Santonja	3	6	[7]
(Germany) J Görges (Czech Republic) B Záhlavová-Strýcová	3	6	[10]
WC	(Australia) J Gajdošová (Croatia) A Tomljanović	6	4	[1]
(Hungary) T Babos (Czech Republic) L Šafářová	7	6
2	(Czech Republic) K Peschke (Slovenia) K Srebotnik	5	4

Semifinals
1	(Italy) S Errani (Italy) R Vinci	6	4	[10]
4	(United States) R Kops-Jones (United States) A Spears	3	6	[7]
(Germany) J Görges (Czech Republic) B Záhlavová-Strýcová	2	5
(Hungary) T Babos (Czech Republic) L Šafářová	6	7

Finals
1	(Italy) S Errani (Italy) R Vinci	5	6	[7]
(Hungary) T Babos (Czech Republic) L Šafářová	7	3	[10]
