= 2013 Apia International Sydney =

Tennis tournament

- Date: 6–12 January 2013
- Edition: 121st
- Draw: 28S / 16D
- Prize money: €494,230
- Surface: Hard / outdoor
- Location: Sydney, Australia

Champions

Men's singles
- (Australia) Bernard Tomic

Women's singles
- (Poland) Agnieszka Radwańska

Men's doubles
- (United States) Bob Bryan / (United States) Mike Bryan

Women's doubles
- (Russia) Nadia Petrova / (Slovenia) Katarina Srebotnik
- Sydney International

The 2013 Apia International Sydney was a joint ATP and WTA tennis tournament, that was played on outdoor hard courts. It was the 121st edition of the Apia International Sydney, and was part of the ATP World Tour 250 series of the 2013 ATP World Tour, and of the WTA Premier tournaments of the 2013 WTA Tour. Both the men's and the women's events took place at the NSW Tennis Centre in Sydney, Australia, from 6 January to 12 January 2013.

== Points and prize money ==
=== Point distribution ===
Event	W	F	SF	QF	Round of 16	Round of 32	Q	Q3	Q2	Q1
Men's singles	250	150	90	45	20	0	12	6	0	0
Men's doubles	250	150	90	45	0	—N/a	—N/a	—N/a	—N/a	—N/a
Women's singles	470	320	200	120	60	1	20	12	8	1
Women's doubles	470	320	200	120	1	—N/a	—N/a	—N/a	—N/a	—N/a

=== Prize money ===
Event	W	F	SF	QF	Round of 16	Round of 32	Q3	Q2	Q1
Men's singles	$78,800	$41,540	$22,500	$12,810	$7,550	$4,470	$720	$345	—N/a
Men's doubles *	$23,950	$12,590	$6,820	$3,900	$2,290	—N/a	—N/a	—N/a	—N/a
Women's singles	$117,000	$62,300	$32,830	$17,650	$9,340	$5,200	$2,730	$1,450	$805
Women's doubles *	$36,500	$19,490	$10,650	$5,425	$2,940	—N/a	—N/a	—N/a	—N/a

_{* per team}

== ATP singles main-draw entrants ==
=== Seeds ===
Country	Player	Rank^{1}	Seed
USA	John Isner	14	1
ITA	Andreas Seppi	23	2
ESP	Fernando Verdasco	24	3
GER	Florian Mayer	28	4
CZE	Radek Štěpánek	31	5
FRA	Jérémy Chardy	32	6
ESP	Jérémy Chardy	34	7
FRA	Julien Benneteau	35	8

- ^{1} Rankings as of December 31, 2012.

=== Other entrants ===
The following players received wildcards into the singles main draw:

- (Australia) James Duckworth
- (Australia) Matthew Ebden
- (Australia) John Millman

The following players received entry from the qualifying draw:

- (Spain) Guillermo García López
- (United States) Ryan Harrison
- (Germany) Björn Phau
- (Portugal) João Sousa

The following player received entry as lucky loser:

- (Slovakia) Ivo Klec

=== Withdrawals ===
Before the tournament

- (France) Richard Gasquet (personal reasons)
- (France) Gilles Simon (neck injury)
- (France) Jo-Wilfried Tsonga (left hamstring injury)

=== Retirements ===
- (Spain) Roberto Bautista Agut (lower abdominal pain)
- (Czech Republic) Radek Štěpánek (intercostal muscle strain)

== ATP doubles main-draw entrants ==
=== Seeds ===
Country	Player	Country	Player	Rank^{1}	Seed
USA	Bob Bryan	USA	Mike Bryan	3	1
IND	Leander Paes	CZE	Radek Štěpánek	7	2
ESP	Marcel Granollers	ESP	Marc López	16	3
BLR	Max Mirnyi	ROU	Horia Tecău	16	4

- ^{1} Rankings as of December 31, 2012.

=== Other entrants ===
The following pairs received wildcards into the doubles main draw:

- (Australia) James Duckworth / (Australia) Chris Guccione
- (Australia) Matthew Ebden / (Australia) Marinko Matosevic

=== Retirements ===
During the tournament

- (Czech Republic) Radek Štěpánek (intercostal muscle strain)

== WTA singles main-draw entrants ==
=== Seeds ===
Country	Player	Rank^{1}	Seed
POL	Agnieszka Radwańska	4	1
GER	Angelique Kerber	5	2
ITA	Sara Errani	6	3
CHN	Li Na	7	4
CZE	Petra Kvitová	8	5
AUS	Samantha Stosur	9	6
DEN	Caroline Wozniacki	10	7
RUS	Nadia Petrova	12	8

- ^{1} Rankings as of December 31, 2012.

=== Other entrants ===
The following players received wildcards into the singles main draw:

- (Australia) Casey Dellacqua
- (Australia) Olivia Rogowska

The following players received entry from the qualifying draw:

- (Japan) Kimiko Date-Krumm
- (United States) Madison Keys
- (Russia) Svetlana Kuznetsova
- (Japan) Ayumi Morita
- (Czech Republic) Karolína Plíšková
- (Kazakhstan) Galina Voskoboeva

== WTA doubles main-draw entrants ==
=== Seeds ===
Country	Player	Country	Player	Rank^{1}	Seed
ITA	Sara Errani	ITA	Roberta Vinci	3	1
CZE	Andrea Hlaváčková	CZE	Lucie Hradecká	7	2
RUS	Maria Kirilenko	USA	Lisa Raymond	13	3
USA	Liezel Huber	IND	Sania Mirza	20	4

- ^{1} Rankings as of December 31, 2012.

=== Other entrants ===
The following pairs received wildcards into the doubles main draw:

- (Australia) Abbie Myers / (Australia) Storm Sanders

== Finals ==
=== Men's singles ===
- (Australia) Bernard Tomic defeated (South Africa) Kevin Anderson, 6–3, 6–7^{(2–7)}, 6–3.
- It was Bernard Tomic's first ATP Tour Title.

=== Women's singles ===
- (Poland) Agnieszka Radwańska defeated (Slovakia) Dominika Cibulková, 6–0, 6–0
- It was the 2nd title of the year for Radwańska, 12th overall.

=== Men's doubles ===
- (United States) Bob Bryan / (United States) Mike Bryan defeated (Belarus) Max Mirnyi / (Romania) Horia Tecău, 6–4, 6–4

=== Women's doubles ===
- (Russia) Nadia Petrova / (Slovenia) Katarina Srebotnik defeated (Italy) Sara Errani / (Italy) Roberta Vinci, 6–3, 6–4
