= 2014 Apia International Sydney – Men's singles =

Men's singles
- 2014 Apia International Sydney

Final
- Champion: (Argentina) Juan Martín del Potro
- Runner-up: (Australia) Bernard Tomic
- Score: 6-3, 6-1

Details
- Draw: 28
- Seeds: 8

Events
Singles	men	women
Doubles	men	women
← 2013 ·	Sydney International	· 2015 →

Bernard Tomic was the defending champion, but lost in the final to Juan Martín del Potro, 3–6, 1–6.

== Seeds ==
1. (Argentina) Juan Martín del Potro (champion)
2. (Poland) Jerzy Janowicz (second round)
3. (Italy) Andreas Seppi (second round)
4. (Russia) Dmitry Tursunov (semifinals)

5. (Canada) Vasek Pospisil (withdrew)
6. (France) Julien Benneteau (second round)
7. (Croatia) Marin Čilić (second round)
8. (Spain) Marcel Granollers (first round)

== Draw ==
=== Key ===
- Q = Qualifier
- WC = Wild card
- LL = Lucky loser
- Alt = Alternate
- ITF = ITF entry
- PR = Protected ranking
- SR = Special ranking
- SE = Special exempt
- JE = Junior exempt
- JR = Junior Accelerator Programme entrant
- CO = College Accelerator Programme entrant
- NG = Next Gen Accelerator Program entrant
- w/o = Walkover
- r = Retired
- d = Defaulted

=== Finals ===
Semifinals
1	(Argentina) Juan Martín del Potro	6	6
4	(Russia) Dmitry Tursunov	4	2
Q	(Ukraine) Sergiy Stakhovsky	7^{7}	5	3
(Australia) Bernard Tomic	6^{4}	7	6

Final
1	(Argentina) Juan Martín del Potro	6	6
(Australia) Bernard Tomic	3	1

=== Top half ===
First round
(France) N Mahut	7^{7}	7
Q	(United States) R Harrison	6^{2}	5
(Czech Republic) R Štěpánek	6^{6}	7^{7}	6
WC	(Australia) S Groth	7^{8}	6^{5}	2
(United States) S Querrey	6	3	4
LL	(Spain) A Ramos	4	6	6
(Portugal) J Sousa	6^{5}	6	6^{1}
(Czech Republic) L Rosol	7^{7}	4	7^{7}
(Uzbekistan) D Istomin	6	6
(Spain) P Andújar	1	2
Q	(Germany) J-L Struff	6	3	3
7	(Croatia) M Čilić	3	6	6

Second round
1	(Argentina) JM del Potro	1	6	6
(France) N Mahut	6	3	4
(Czech Republic) R Štěpánek	6	7^{7}
LL	(Spain) A Ramos	2	6^{5}
4	(Russia) D Tursunov	3	6	6
(Czech Republic) L Rosol	6	3	3
(Uzbekistan) D Istomin	6	6
7	(Croatia) M Čilić	3	4

Quarterfinals
1	(Argentina) JM del Potro	6	3	6
(Czech Republic) R Štěpánek	4	6	3
4	(Russia) D Tursunov	7^{7}	6
(Uzbekistan) D Istomin	6^{5}	2

Semifinals
1	(Argentina) JM del Potro	6	6
4	(Russia) D Tursunov	4	2

=== Bottom half ===
First round
6	(France) J Benneteau	6	6
WC	(Australia) M Ebden	2	2
(Argentina) C Berlocq	3	4
Q	(Ukraine) S Stakhovsky	6	6
(Germany) F Mayer	2	6	3
WC	(Australia) M Matosevic	6	4	6
8	(Spain) M Granollers	3	0
(Australia) B Tomic	6	6
Q	(Slovenia) B Kavčič	6	6
(Finland) J Nieminen	4	3
(France) É Roger-Vasselin	3	0^{r}
(Ukraine) A Dolgopolov	6	0

Second round
6	(France) J Benneteau	3	2
Q	(Ukraine) S Stakhovsky	6	6
WC	(Australia) M Matosevic	6	6
3	(Italy) A Seppi	3	4
(Australia) B Tomic	6	4	6
Q	(Slovenia) B Kavčič	3	6	4
(Ukraine) A Dolgopolov	6	6
2	(Poland) J Janowicz	2	2

Quarterfinals
Q	(Ukraine) S Stakhovsky	6	6
WC	(Australia) M Matosevic	4	3
(Australia) B Tomic	6	6
(Ukraine) A Dolgopolov	4	3

Semifinals
Q	(Ukraine) S Stakhovsky	7^{7}	5	3
(Australia) B Tomic	6^{4}	7	6

== Qualifying ==
=== Seeds ===
1. (Kazakhstan) Mikhail Kukushkin (first round)
2. (Russia) Teymuraz Gabashvili (first round)
3. (Germany) Benjamin Becker (first round)
4. (Kazakhstan) Andrey Golubev (second round)
5. (Spain) Albert Ramos (qualifying competition, lucky loser)
6. (France) Kenny de Schepper (first round)
7. (Czech Republic) Jiří Veselý (qualifying competition)
8. (Russia) Alex Bogomolov Jr. (qualifying competition)

=== Qualifiers ===
1. (Germany) Jan-Lennard Struff
2. (Slovenia) Blaž Kavčič
3. (United States) Ryan Harrison
4. (Ukraine) Sergiy Stakhovsky

=== Lucky loser ===
1. (Spain) Albert Ramos

=== Qualifying draw ===
==== First qualifier ====
First round
1	(Kazakhstan) Mikhail Kukushkin	6^{6}	2
(Germany) Jan-Lennard Struff	7^{8}	6
(Belgium) Niels Desein	2	6	4
(India) Somdev Devvarman	6	2	6
(China) Wu Di	5	3
WC	(Australia) Jordan Thompson	7	6
(Italy) Flavio Cipolla	6	2	1
7	(Czech Republic) Jiří Veselý	2	6	6

Second round
(Germany) Jan-Lennard Struff	2	6	6
(India) Somdev Devvarman	6	2	3
WC	(Australia) Jordan Thompson	7^{7}	3	1
7	(Czech Republic) Jiří Veselý	6^{4}	6	6

Qualifying competition
(Germany) Jan-Lennard Struff	7^{7}	7^{7}
7	(Czech Republic) Jiří Veselý	6^{5}	6^{4}

==== Second qualifier ====
First round
2	(Russia) Teymuraz Gabashvili	3	3
(Slovenia) Blaž Kavčič	6	6
(Spain) José Checa Calvo	5	1
(Japan) Go Soeda	7	6
(United States) Wayne Odesnik	6	7^{7}
WC	(Australia) Matthew Barton	2	6^{5}
WC	(Australia) Jacob Grills	6^{1}	2
5	(Spain) Albert Ramos	7^{7}	6

Second round
(Slovenia) Blaž Kavčič	6	7^{7}
(Japan) Go Soeda	1	6^{0}
(United States) Wayne Odesnik	4	0^{r}
5	(Spain) Albert Ramos	6	5

Qualifying competition
(Slovenia) Blaž Kavčič	4	6	6
5	(Spain) Albert Ramos	6	4	2

==== Third qualifier ====
First round
3	(Germany) Benjamin Becker	3	2
(United States) Ryan Harrison	6	6
(South Africa) Rik de Voest	5	4
(France) Stéphane Robert	7	6
(Australia) Matt Reid	6^{3}	2
(Australia) John-Patrick Smith	7^{7}	6
(Kazakhstan) Oleksandr Nedovyesov	3	2
8	(Russia) Alex Bogomolov Jr.	6	6

Second round
(United States) Ryan Harrison	6	6
(France) Stéphane Robert	3	2
(Australia) John-Patrick Smith	4	3
8	(Russia) Alex Bogomolov Jr.	6	6

Qualifying competition
(United States) Ryan Harrison	6	2	7^{7}
8	(Russia) Alex Bogomolov Jr.	3	6	6^{3}

==== Fourth qualifier ====
First round
4	(Kazakhstan) Andrey Golubev	7^{7}	6
WC	(Australia) Dane Propoggia	6^{4}	3
(Croatia) Kristijan Mesaroš	4	4
(Switzerland) Henri Laaksonen	6	6
(Canada) Frank Dancevic	6	4	6
(Egypt) Mohamed Safwat	2	6	3
(Ukraine) Sergiy Stakhovsky	7^{7}	6
6	(France) Kenny de Schepper	6^{3}	4

Second round
4	(Kazakhstan) Andrey Golubev	5	1
(Switzerland) Henri Laaksonen	7	6
(Canada) Frank Dancevic	3	2
(Ukraine) Sergiy Stakhovsky	6	6

Qualifying competition
(Switzerland) Henri Laaksonen	2	1
(Ukraine) Sergiy Stakhovsky	6	6
