= 2013 Apia International Sydney – Men's doubles =

Men's doubles
- 2013 Apia International Sydney

Final
- Champions: (United States) Bob Bryan (United States) Mike Bryan
- Runners-up: (Belarus) Max Mirnyi (Romania) Horia Tecău
- Score: 6–4, 6–4

Events
Singles	men	women
Doubles	men	women
← 2012 ·	Sydney International	· 2014 →

Bob Bryan and Mike Bryan successfully defended the title by beating Max Mirnyi and Horia Tecău 6–4, 6–4 in the final.

== Seeds ==
1. (United States) Bob Bryan / (United States) Mike Bryan (champions)
2. (India) Leander Paes / (Czech Republic) Radek Štěpánek (quarterfinals, withdrew due to Štěpánek's intercostal strain)
3. (Spain) Marcel Granollers / (Spain) Marc López (semifinals)
4. (Belarus) Max Mirnyi / (Romania) Horia Tecău (final)

== Draw ==
=== Key ===
- Q = Qualifier
- WC = Wild card
- LL = Lucky loser
- Alt = Alternate
- SE = Special exempt
- PR = Protected ranking
- ITF = ITF entry
- JE = Junior exempt
- w/o = Walkover
- r = Retired
- d = Defaulted
- SR = Special ranking

=== Draw ===
First round
1	(United States) B Bryan (United States) M Bryan	6	5	[11]
(Colombia) JS Cabal (Poland) M Matkowski	4	7	[9]
(France) J Benneteau (France) M Llodra	7^{7}	6
(Sweden) R Lindstedt (Serbia) N Zimonjić	6^{3}	3
3	(Spain) M Granollers (Spain) M López	6	6
(India) R Bopanna (Brazil) M Melo	4	2
WC	(Australia) J Duckworth (Australia) C Guccione	4	5
(France) J Chardy (Poland) Ł Kubot	6	7
(India) M Bhupathi (Canada) D Nestor	3	7^{7}	[10]
WC	(Australia) M Ebden (Australia) M Matosevic	6	6^{2}	[8]
(Germany) C Kas (Italy) A Seppi	1	4
4	(Belarus) M Mirnyi (Romania) H Tecău	6	6
(Spain) D Marrero (Spain) F Verdasco	6^{3}	6	[10]
(Pakistan) A-u-H Qureshi (Netherlands) J-J Rojer	7^{7}	3	[5]
(France) É Roger-Vasselin (France) G Simon	4	6	[5]
2	(India) L Paes (Czech Republic) R Štěpánek	6	4	[10]

Quarterfinals
1	(United States) B Bryan (United States) M Bryan	6	6
(France) J Benneteau (France) M Llodra	3	2
3	(Spain) M Granollers (Spain) M López	3	6	[13]
(France) J Chardy (Poland) Ł Kubot	6	4	[11]
(India) M Bhupathi (Canada) D Nestor	3	4
4	(Belarus) M Mirnyi (Romania) H Tecău	6	6
(Spain) D Marrero (Spain) F Verdasco	w/o
2	(India) L Paes (Czech Republic) R Štěpánek

Semifinals
1	(United States) B Bryan (United States) M Bryan	7	6
3	(Spain) M Granollers (Spain) M López	5	3
4	(Belarus) M Mirnyi (Romania) H Tecău	6	6
(Spain) D Marrero (Spain) F Verdasco	1	1

Final
1	(United States) B Bryan (United States) M Bryan	6	6
4	(Belarus) M Mirnyi (Romania) H Tecău	4	4
