= 2014 Apia International Sydney – Women's singles =

Women's singles
- 2014 Apia International Sydney

Final
- Champion: (Bulgaria) Tsvetana Pironkova
- Runner-up: (Germany) Angelique Kerber
- Score: 6–4, 6–4

Details
- Draw: 28 (6 Q / 2 WC )
- Seeds: 8

Events
Singles	men	women
Doubles	men	women
- Sydney International

Agnieszka Radwańska was the defending champion, but she lost in the second round to Bethanie Mattek-Sands.

Tsvetana Pironkova won her maiden WTA title, defeating Angelique Kerber in the final, 6–4, 6–4.

== Seeds ==
The top two seeds receive a bye into the second round.

1. (Poland) Agnieszka Radwańska (second round)
2. (Czech Republic) Petra Kvitová (semifinals)
3. (Italy) Sara Errani (quarterfinals)
4. (Serbia) Jelena Janković (first round)

5. (Germany) Angelique Kerber (final)
6. (Denmark) Caroline Wozniacki (second round)
7. (Romania) Simona Halep (first round)
8. (United States) Sloane Stephens (withdrew due to a wrist injury)

== Main draw ==
Key

- Q = Qualifier
- WC = Wild card
- LL = Lucky loser
- Alt = Alternate
- ITF = ITF entry
- PR = Protected ranking
- SR = Special ranking
- SE = Special exempt
- JE = Junior exempt
- JR = Junior Accelerator Programme entrant
- CO = College Accelerator Programme entrant
- NG = Next Gen Accelerator Program entrant
- w/o = Walkover
- r = Retired
- d = Defaulted

=== Finals ===
Semifinals
(United States) Madison Keys	4	2
5	(Germany) Angelique Kerber	6	6
Q	(Bulgaria) Tsvetana Pironkova	6	6
2	(Czech Republic) Petra Kvitová	4	3

Final
5	(Germany) Angelique Kerber	4	4
Q	(Bulgaria) Tsvetana Pironkova	6	6

=== Top half ===
First round
(Canada) E Bouchard	4	3
Q	(United States) B Mattek-Sands	6	6
(Slovakia) D Hantuchová	4	5
WC	(Croatia) A Tomljanović	6	7
(United States) M Keys	6	6
7	(Romania) S Halep	1	4
4	(Serbia) J Janković	4	2
(Russia) E Makarova	6	6
Q	(Argentina) P Ormaechea	6	6^{5}	2
(Spain) C Suárez Navarro	3	7^{7}	6
(Estonia) K Kanepi	6	6
Q	(United States) V Duval	1	3
(Slovakia) D Cibulková	6^{5}	5
5	(Germany) A Kerber	7^{7}	7

Second round
1	(Poland) A Radwańska	5	2
Q	(United States) B Mattek-Sands	7	6
WC	(Croatia) A Tomljanović	0	6	6^{3}
(United States) M Keys	6	3	7^{7}
(Russia) E Makarova	6^{4}	3
(Spain) C Suárez Navarro	7^{7}	6
(Estonia) K Kanepi	3	4
5	(Germany) A Kerber	6	6

Quarterfinals
Q	(United States) B Mattek-Sands	2^{r}
(United States) M Keys	3
(Spain) C Suárez Navarro	2	4
5	(Germany) A Kerber	6	6

Semifinals
(United States) M Keys	4	2
5	(Germany) A Kerber	6	6

=== Bottom half ===
First round
LL	(United States) V Lepchenko	6	3	7
(Russia) S Kuznetsova	3	6	5
(Romania) S Cîrstea	4	1
Q	(Bulgaria) T Pironkova	6	6
WC	(Australia) J Gajdošová	4	6^{8}
Q	(United States) L Davis	6	7
(Italy) R Vinci	4	2
3	(Italy) S Errani	6	6
6	(Denmark) C Wozniacki	3	6	6
LL	(Germany) J Görges	6	2	4
(Czech Republic) L Šafářová	6	6
(Italy) F Schiavone	4	4
Q	(United States) C McHale	6^{4}	6	7
(France) A Cornet	7^{7}	2	5

Second round
LL	(United States) V Lepchenko	3	2
Q	(Bulgaria) T Pironkova	6	6
Q	(United States) L Davis	5	2
3	(Italy) S Errani	7	6
6	(Denmark) C Wozniacki	4	6^{7}
(Czech Republic) L Šafářová	6	7^{9}
Q	(United States) C McHale	1	0
2	(Czech Republic) P Kvitová	6	6

Quarterfinals
Q	(Bulgaria) T Pironkova	7^{7}	6
3	(Italy) S Errani	6^{2}	3
(Czech Republic) L Šafářová	6^{4}	2
2	(Czech Republic) P Kvitová	7^{7}	6

Semifinals
Q	(Bulgaria) T Pironkova	6	6
2	(Czech Republic) P Kvitová	4	3

== Qualifying ==
=== Seeds ===
1. (United States) Bethanie Mattek-Sands (qualified)
2. (United States) Varvara Lepchenko (qualifying competition, lucky loser)
3. (Japan) Ayumi Morita (first round; retired)
4. (Argentina) Paula Ormaechea (qualified)
5. (United States) Christina McHale (qualified)
6. (Kazakhstan) Galina Voskoboeva (withdrew due to being in the Brisbane doubles final)
7. (Ukraine) Lesia Tsurenko (second round)
8. (United States) Lauren Davis (qualified)
9. (Germany) Julia Görges (qualifying competition, lucky loser)
10. (Japan) Kimiko Date-Krumm (first round)
11. (Israel) Shahar Pe'er (qualifying competition)
12. (Kazakhstan) Yaroslava Shvedova (qualifying competition)

=== Qualifiers ===
1. (United States) Bethanie Mattek-Sands
2. (United States) Victoria Duval
3. (Bulgaria) Tsvetana Pironkova
4. (Argentina) Paula Ormaechea
5. (United States) Christina McHale
6. (United States) Lauren Davis

=== Lucky loser ===
1. (United States) Varvara Lepchenko
2. (Germany) Julia Görges

=== Draw ===
==== First qualifier ====
First round
1	(United States) Bethanie Mattek-Sands	7	6
(Thailand) Luksika Kumkhum	5	4
(United Kingdom) Heather Watson	4	6	6
(Sweden) Johanna Larsson	6	0	1
(Romania) Irina-Camelia Begu	6	6
WC	(Australia) Jessica Moore	1	3
WC	(Australia) Zoe Hives	2	0
9	(Germany) Julia Görges	6	6

Second round
1	(United States) Bethanie Mattek-Sands	6	6
(United Kingdom) Heather Watson	2	3
(Romania) Irina-Camelia Begu	1	6^{2}
9	(Germany) Julia Görges	6	7^{7}

Qualifying competition
1	(United States) Bethanie Mattek-Sands	3
9	(Germany) Julia Görges	2^{r}

==== Second qualifier ====
Quarterfinals
2	(United States) Varvara Lepchenko	6	6
(France) Claire Feuerstein	1	0
WC	(Australia) Sara Tomic	4	1
(Netherlands) Kiki Bertens	6	6
(United States) Victoria Duval	6	6
WC	(Australia) Isabella Holland	2	1
(Croatia) Mirjana Lučić-Baroni	2	6	6
10	(Japan) Kimiko Date-Krumm	6	3	2

Semifinals
2	(United States) Varvara Lepchenko	6	6
(Netherlands) Kiki Bertens	4	4
(United States) Victoria Duval	6	7
(Croatia) Mirjana Lučić-Baroni	4	5

Finals
2	(United States) Varvara Lepchenko	5	5
(United States) Victoria Duval	7	7

==== Third qualifier ====
First round
3	(Japan) Ayumi Morita	3	0^{r}
(Bulgaria) Tsvetana Pironkova	6	2
(Australia) Tammi Patterson	4	5
(Ukraine) Maryna Zanevska	6	7
(Poland) Katarzyna Piter	3	6	7
(Serbia) Vesna Dolonc	6	1	5
(Canada) Stéphanie Dubois	1	3
11	(Israel) Shahar Pe'er	6	6

Second round
(Bulgaria) Tsvetana Pironkova	6	6
(Ukraine) Maryna Zanevska	1	3
(Poland) Katarzyna Piter	1	6	5
11	(Israel) Shahar Pe'er	6	3	7

Qualifying competition
(Bulgaria) Tsvetana Pironkova	6	6^{4}	6
11	(Israel) Shahar Pe'er	3	7^{7}	3

==== Fourth qualifier ====
First round
4	(Argentina) Paula Ormaechea	6	5	7^{7}
(Poland) Alicja Rosolska	3	7	6^{4}
(United States) Abigail Spears	6	6
(United States) Coco Vandeweghe	4	2
WC	(Australia) Viktorija Rajicic	1	4
(Slovakia) Anna Schmiedlová	6	6
(Luxembourg) Mandy Minella	4	2
7	(Ukraine) Lesia Tsurenko	6	6

Second round
4	(Argentina) Paula Ormaechea	7	3	6
(United States) Abigail Spears	5	6	2
(Slovakia) Anna Schmiedlová	6	1	6
7	(Ukraine) Lesia Tsurenko	4	6	3

Qualifying competition
4	(Argentina) Paula Ormaechea	7^{7}	6
(Slovakia) Anna Schmiedlová	6^{2}	1

==== Fifth qualifier ====
First round
5	(United States) Christina McHale	5	7	6
(Italy) Camila Giorgi	7	5	3
(Spain) Arantxa Parra Santonja	6	6
WC	(Australia) Sally Peers	2	3
(Australia) Monique Adamczak	2	4
(Chinese Taipei) Hsieh Su-wei	6	6
(France) Virginie Razzano	6	2	2
12	(Kazakhstan) Yaroslava Shvedova	3	6	6

Second round
5	(United States) Christina McHale	6	6
(Spain) Arantxa Parra Santonja	3	0
(Chinese Taipei) Hsieh Su-wei	7^{7}	3	4
12	(Kazakhstan) Yaroslava Shvedova	6^{0}	6	6

Qualifying competition
5	(United States) Christina McHale	6	6
12	(Kazakhstan) Yaroslava Shvedova	3	4

==== Sixth qualifier ====
First round
Alt	(United States) Raquel Kops-Jones	2	2
(Kazakhstan) Yulia Putintseva	6	6
(Russia) Arina Rodionova	1	0
(South Africa) Chanelle Scheepers	6	6
(Slovakia) Kristína Kučová	4	3
(Japan) Misaki Doi	6	6
(Hungary) Tímea Babos	4	3
8	(United States) Lauren Davis	6	6

Second round
(Kazakhstan) Yulia Putintseva	2	1
(South Africa) Chanelle Scheepers	6	6
(Japan) Misaki Doi	0	6	5
8	(United States) Lauren Davis	6	4	7

Qualifying competition
(South Africa) Chanelle Scheepers	6^{6}	3
8	(United States) Lauren Davis	7^{8}	6
