= 2013 Apia International Sydney – Men's singles =

Men's singles
- 2013 Apia International Sydney

Final
- Champion: (Australia) Bernard Tomic
- Runner-up: (South Africa) Kevin Anderson
- Score: 6–3, 6–7^{(2–7)}, 6–3

Details
- Draw: 28
- Seeds: 8

Events
| Singles | men | women |
| Doubles | men | women |
| ← 2012 · | Sydney International | · 2014 → |

Bernard Tomic defeated Kevin Anderson in the final, 6–3, 6–7^{(2–7)}, 6–3 to win the men's singles tennis title at the 2013 Apia International Sydney. It was his first ATP Tour title.

Jarkko Nieminen was the defending champion, but lost to Tomic in the quarterfinals.

== Seeds ==
1. (United States) John Isner (second round)
2. (France) Gilles Simon (withdrew due to a neck injury)
3. (Italy) Andreas Seppi (semifinals)
4. (Spain) Fernando Verdasco (second round)
5. (Germany) Florian Mayer (second round)
6. (Czech Republic) Radek Štěpánek (second round, retired due to an intercostal muscle strain)
7. (France) Jérémy Chardy (first round)
8. (Spain) Marcel Granollers (quarterfinals)

== Draw ==
=== Key ===
- Q = Qualifier
- WC = Wild card
- LL = Lucky loser
- Alt = Alternate
- SE = Special exempt
- PR = Protected ranking
- ITF = ITF entry
- JE = Junior exempt
- w/o = Walkover
- r = Retired
- d = Defaulted
- SR = Special ranking

=== Finals ===
Semifinals
(France) Julien Benneteau | 6 | 4 | 6^{8}
(South Africa) Kevin Anderson | 3 | 6 | 7^{10}
3 | (Italy) Andreas Seppi | 6^{10} | 4
(Australia) Bernard Tomic | 7^{12} | 6

Final
(South Africa) Kevin Anderson | 3 | 7^{7} | 3
(Australia) Bernard Tomic | 6 | 6^{2} | 6

=== Top half ===
First round
SE | (Spain) R Bautista-Agut | 1^{r}
Q | (United States) R Harrison | 2
(France) J Benneteau | 6 | 5 | 6
(Spain) P Andújar | 3 | 7 | 2
Q | (Spain) G García-López | 2 | 3
6 | (Czech Republic) R Štěpánek | 6 | 6
(Uzbekistan) D Istomin | 6^{4} | 6 | 7^{7}
WC | (Australia) J Duckworth | 7^{7} | 4 | 6^{3}
SE | (Slovenia) A Bedene | 3 | 6 | 3
(South Africa) K Anderson | 6 | 3 | 6
(Spain) F López | 6^{2} | 7 | 6
7 | (France) J Chardy | 7^{7} | 5 | 3

Second round
1 | (United States) J Isner | 4 | 4
Q | (United States) R Harrison | 6 | 6
(France) J Benneteau | 0
6 | (Czech Republic) R Štěpánek | 0^{r}
4 | (Spain) F Verdasco | 3 | 3
(Uzbekistan) D Istomin | 6 | 6
(South Africa) K Anderson | 6 | 6
(Spain) F López | 3 | 4

Quarterfinals
Q | (United States) R Harrison | 4 | 2
(France) J Benneteau | 6 | 6
(Uzbekistan) D Istomin | 4 | 3
(South Africa) K Anderson | 6 | 6

Semifinals
(France) J Benneteau | 6 | 4 | 6^{8}
(South Africa) K Anderson | 3 | 6 | 7^{10}

=== Bottom half ===
First round
8 | (Spain) M Granollers | 5 | 7 | 6
WC | (Australia) M Ebden | 7 | 5 | 1
(Bulgaria) G Dimitrov | 3 | 1
(Italy) F Fognini | 6 | 6
PR | (Spain) T Robredo | 3 | 4
WC | (Australia) J Millman | 6 | 6
5 | (Germany) F Mayer | 6 | 6
Q | (Portugal) J Sousa | 1 | 2
(Australia) B Tomic | 6 | 6
(Australia) M Matosevic | 3 | 4
(Finland) J Nieminen | 6 | 6
Q | (Germany) B Phau | 0 | 1

Second round
8 | (Spain) M Granollers | 6 | 7^{7}
(Italy) F Fognini | 2 | 6^{4}
WC | (Australia) J Millman | 2 | 6 | 3
3 | (Italy) A Seppi | 6 | 3 | 6
5 | (Germany) F Mayer | 6^{4} | 2
(Australia) B Tomic | 7^{7} | 6
(Finland) J Nieminen | 6 | 6
LL | (Slovakia) I Klec | 3 | 1

Quarterfinals
8 | (Spain) M Granollers | 4 | 5
3 | (Italy) A Seppi | 6 | 7
(Australia) B Tomic | 6^{6} | 6 | 6
(Finland) J Nieminen | 7^{8} | 4 | 2

Semifinals
3 | (Italy) A Seppi | 6^{10} | 4
(Australia) B Tomic | 7^{12} | 6

== Qualifying ==
=== Seeds ===
1. (France) Michaël Llodra (withdrew due to desynchronosis)
2. (United States) Ryan Harrison (qualified)
3. (Germany) Björn Phau (qualified)
4. (Spain) Guillermo García-López (qualified)
5. (Japan) Tatsuma Ito (second round)
6. (Russia) Evgeny Donskoy (second round)
7. (France) Guillaume Rufin (first round)
8. (Slovenia) Blaž Kavčič (qualifying competition)

=== Qualifiers ===
1. (Portugal) João Sousa
2. (United States) Ryan Harrison
3. (Germany) Björn Phau
4. (Spain) Guillermo García-López

=== Draw ===
==== First qualifier ====
First round
Alt | (Australia) Simon Ede | 2 | 6^{7}
(Australia) John-Patrick Smith | 6 | 7^{9}
(Austria) Andreas Haider-Maurer | 2
(Germany) Simon Greul | 0^{r}
(Chinese Taipei) Jimmy Wang | 4 | 3
(Australia) Adam Feeney | 6 | 6
(Portugal) João Sousa | 6 | 6
7 | (France) Guillaume Rufin | 2 | 1

Second round
(Australia) John-Patrick Smith | 6 | 7
(Austria) Andreas Haider-Maurer | 2 | 5
(Australia) Adam Feeney | 4 | 6 | 2
(Portugal) João Sousa | 6 | 3 | 6

Qualifying competition
(Australia) John-Patrick Smith | 2 | 6 | 2
(Portugal) João Sousa | 6 | 3 | 6

==== Second qualifier ====
First round
2 | (United States) Ryan Harrison | 6 | 7
(Australia) Matt Reid | 1 | 5
WC | (Australia) Jay Andrijic | 6 | 2
(United States) Michael Yani | 3 | 2^{r}
WC | (Australia) John Peers | 6^{2} | 1
(China) Wu Di | 7^{7} | 6
(Czech Republic) Jan Hájek | 6^{3} | 6^{4}
8 | (Slovenia) Blaž Kavčič | 7^{7} | 7^{7}

Second round
2 | (United States) Ryan Harrison | 6 | 6
WC | (Australia) Jay Andrijic | 1 | 2
(China) Wu Di | 6 | 4 | 4
8 | (Slovenia) Blaž Kavčič | 4 | 6 | 6

Qualifying competition
2 | (United States) Ryan Harrison | 7 | 6
8 | (Slovenia) Blaž Kavčič | 5 | 3

==== Third qualifier ====
First round
3 | (Germany) Björn Phau | 6 | 6
(France) Pierre-Hugues Herbert | 3 | 4
(France) Kenny de Schepper | 6^{6} | 6^{4}
Alt | (Slovakia) Ivo Klec | 7^{8} | 7^{7}
WC | (Australia) Matthew Barton | 6^{0} | 7^{7} | 7^{7}
(Croatia) Ivo Karlović | 7^{7} | 6^{5} | 6^{5}
(Australia) Luke Saville | 4 | 2
5 | (Japan) Tatsuma Ito | 6 | 6

Second round
3 | (Germany) Björn Phau | 6 | 6
Alt | (Slovakia) Ivo Klec | 4 | 1
WC | (Australia) Matthew Barton | 7 | 6
5 | (Japan) Tatsuma Ito | 5 | 1

Qualifying competition
3 | (Germany) Björn Phau | 6 | 6
WC | (Australia) Matthew Barton | 4 | 2

==== Fourth qualifier ====
First round
4 | (Spain) Guillermo García-López | 7^{7} | 6
WC | (Australia) Jordan Thompson | 6^{5} | 1
(Australia) Alex Bolt | 6 | 6
(Australia) Benjamin Mitchell | 3 | 4
(Poland) Michał Przysiężny | 6^{4} | 1
(United States) Rhyne Williams | 7^{7} | 6
(Italy) Matteo Viola | 5 | 4
6 | (Russia) Evgeny Donskoy | 7 | 6

Second round
4 | (Spain) Guillermo García-López | 6 | 6
(Australia) Alex Bolt | 4 | 4
(United States) Rhyne Williams | 6 | 6
6 | (Russia) Evgeny Donskoy | 4 | 1

Qualifying competition
4 | (Spain) Guillermo García-López | 7^{7} | 6
(United States) Rhyne Williams | 6^{5} | 3
