= 2013 Apia International Sydney – Women's singles =

Women's singles
- 2013 Apia International Sydney

Final
- Champion: (Poland) Agnieszka Radwańska
- Runner-up: (Slovakia) Dominika Cibulková
- Score: 6–0, 6–0

Details
- Draw: 28 (6 Q / 2 WC )
- Seeds: 8

Events
Singles	men	women
Doubles	men	women
- Sydney International

Victoria Azarenka was the defending champion, but chose not to participate this year.

Agnieszka Radwańska won the title, defeating Dominika Cibulková in the final, 6–0, 6–0. This was only the eighth WTA singles final to be won with a 6–0, 6–0 (a "double bagel") scoreline in history, and the first since Marion Bartoli won the 2006 Challenge Bell.

== Seeds ==
1. (Poland) Agnieszka Radwańska (champion)
2. (Germany) Angelique Kerber (semifinals)
3. (Italy) Sara Errani (quarterfinals)
4. (China) Li Na (semifinals)
5. (Czech Republic) Petra Kvitová (first round)
6. (Australia) Samantha Stosur (first round)
7. (Denmark) Caroline Wozniacki (second round)
8. (Russia) Nadia Petrova (first round)

== Draw ==
=== Finals ===
Semifinals
1	(Poland) Agnieszka Radwańska	6	6
4	(China) Li Na	3	4
(Slovakia) Dominika Cibulková	6	4	6
2	(Germany) Angelique Kerber	2	6	3

Final
1	(Poland) Agnieszka Radwańska	6	6
(Slovakia) Dominika Cibulková	0	0

=== Top half ===
First round
WC	(Australia) C Dellacqua	4	1
Q	(Japan) K Date-Krumm	6	6
(Austria) T Paszek	2	6^{5}
(Serbia) J Janković	6	7^{7}
(Italy) R Vinci	7	7
8	(Russia) N Petrova	5	5
4	(China) N Li	7^{7}	7
(United States) C McHale	6^{2}	5
Q	(Japan) A Morita	1	6	6
(Slovakia) D Hantuchová	6	3	3
(Czech Republic) L Šafářová	2	1
Q	(United States) M Keys	6	6
(China) J Zheng	6	6^{7}	6
6	(Australia) S Stosur	3	7^{9}	4

Second round
1	(Poland) A Radwańska	6	6
Q	(Japan) K Date-Krumm	4	3
(Serbia) J Janković	6	4	6^{4}
(Italy) R Vinci	3	6	7^{7}
4	(China) N Li	6	6
Q	(Japan) A Morita	1	0
Q	(United States) M Keys	6	6
(China) J Zheng	0	4

Quarterfinals
1	(Poland) A Radwańska	6	7
(Italy) R Vinci	4	5
4	(China) N Li	4	7^{7}	6
Q	(United States) M Keys	6	6^{2}	2

Semifinals
1	(Poland) A Radwańska	6	6
4	(China) N Li	3	4

=== Bottom half ===
First round
5	(Czech Republic) P Kvitová	1	1
(Slovakia) D Cibulková	6	6
(United States) V Lepchenko	4	6	1
(Russia) E Makarova	6	4	6
WC	(Australia) O Rogowska	5	2
(Russia) M Kirilenko	7	6
Q	(Czech Republic) Ka Plíšková	1	3
3	(Italy) S Errani	6	6
7	(Denmark) C Wozniacki	6	6
(Poland) U Radwańska	1	2
Q	(Russia) S Kuznetsova	3	6	6
(Germany) J Görges	6	3	3
Q	(Kazakhstan) G Voskoboeva	3	7^{7}	6
(Belgium) Y Wickmayer	6	6^{5}	2

Second round
(Slovakia) D Cibulková	7^{7}	1	7^{7}
(Russia) E Makarova	6^{3}	6	6^{1}
(Russia) M Kirilenko	1	1
3	(Italy) S Errani	6	6
7	(Denmark) C Wozniacki	6^{4}	6	2
Q	(Russia) S Kuznetsova	7^{7}	1	6
Q	(Kazakhstan) G Voskoboeva	2	5
2	(Germany) A Kerber	6	7

Quarterfinals
(Slovakia) D Cibulková	6	6
3	(Italy) S Errani	2	1
Q	(Russia) S Kuznetsova	3	5
2	(Germany) A Kerber	6	7

Semifinals
(Slovakia) D Cibulková	6	4	6
2	(Germany) A Kerber	2	6	3

== Qualifying ==
=== Seeds ===
1. (Germany) Sabine Lisicki (withdrew because of a virus)
2. (Sweden) Sofia Arvidsson (qualifying competition)
3. (Czech Republic) Lucie Hradecká (second round)
4. (Georgia (country)) Anna Tatishvili (qualifying competition)
5. (Netherlands) Kiki Bertens (first round)
6. (Czech Republic) Andrea Hlaváčková (second round)
7. (France) Pauline Parmentier (first round)
8. (New Zealand) Marina Erakovic (qualifying competition)
9. (United States) Vania King (second round)
10. (United States) Jamie Hampton (withdrew; was still competing in Auckland)
11. (Russia) Svetlana Kuznetsova (qualified)
12. (Netherlands) Arantxa Rus (first round)
13. (Sweden) Johanna Larsson (second round)

=== Qualifiers ===
1. (Czech Republic) Karolína Plíšková
2. (Kazakhstan) Galina Voskoboeva
3. (Japan) Ayumi Morita
4. (Japan) Kimiko Date-Krumm
5. (United States) Madison Keys
6. (Russia) Svetlana Kuznetsova

=== Draw ===
==== First qualifier ====
First round
Alt	(Italy) Nastassja Burnett	6	3	3
(Spain) Estrella Cabeza Candela	2	6	6
(Argentina) Paula Ormaechea	1	6	4
(United States) Melanie Oudin	6	3	6
(Czech Republic) Karolína Plíšková	6	6
(Russia) Alexandra Panova	3	2
Alt	(United States) Irina Falconi	6	2	6
7	(France) Pauline Parmentier	4	6	4

Second round
(Spain) Estrella Cabeza Candela	6	6
(United States) Melanie Oudin	2	2
(Czech Republic) Karolína Plíšková	7^{7}	6
Alt	(United States) Irina Falconi	6^{5}	3

Qualifying competition
(Spain) Estrella Cabeza Candela	6^{3}	2
(Czech Republic) Karolína Plíšková	7^{7}	6

==== Second qualifier ====
First round
2	(Sweden) Sofia Arvidsson	6	6
WC	(Australia) Monique Adamczak	4	2
(Russia) Olga Puchkova	6	6
(Romania) Alexandra Cadanțu	2	4
WC	(Australia) Azra Hadzic	2	4
(United States) Coco Vandeweghe	6	6
(Kazakhstan) Galina Voskoboeva	6	6
12	(Netherlands) Arantxa Rus	2	1

Second round
2	(Sweden) Sofia Arvidsson	6	6
(Russia) Olga Puchkova	2	3
(United States) Coco Vandeweghe	3	4
(Kazakhstan) Galina Voskoboeva	6	6

Qualifying competition
2	(Sweden) Sofia Arvidsson	6^{5}	6^{4}
(Kazakhstan) Galina Voskoboeva	7^{7}	7^{7}

==== Third qualifier ====
First round
3	(Czech Republic) Lucie Hradecká	3	6	6
WC	(Australia) Abbie Myers	6	2	0
(Japan) Ayumi Morita	6	6
WC	(Australia) Naiktha Bains	2	2
(Israel) Shahar Pe'er	0	4
(Hungary) Gréta Arn	6	6
Alt	(France) Caroline Garcia	7	4	4
8	(New Zealand) Marina Erakovic	5	6	6

Second round
3	(Czech Republic) Lucie Hradecká	2	2
(Japan) Ayumi Morita	6	6
(Hungary) Gréta Arn	5	6	4
8	(New Zealand) Marina Erakovic	7	4	6

Qualifying competition
(Japan) Ayumi Morita	6	6
8	(New Zealand) Marina Erakovic	3	0

==== Fourth qualifier ====
First round
4	(Georgia (country)) Anna Tatishvili	6	1	7^{7}
WC	(Russia) Arina Rodionova	0	6	6^{3}
(United States) Julia Cohen	3	3
(France) Claire Feuerstein	6	6
(United States) Mallory Burdette	1	3
(Japan) Kimiko Date-Krumm	6	6
(United States) Maria Sanchez	1	7^{7}	4
9	(United States) Vania King	6	6^{2}	6

Second round
4	(Georgia (country)) Anna Tatishvili	6	6
(France) Claire Feuerstein	2	3
(Japan) Kimiko Date-Krumm	2	6	6
9	(United States) Vania King	6	4	2

Qualifying competition
4	(Georgia (country)) Anna Tatishvili	3	0
(Japan) Kimiko Date-Krumm	6	6

==== Fifth qualifier ====
First round
5	(Netherlands) Kiki Bertens	3	0
(Japan) Misaki Doi	6	6
(Canada) Eugenie Bouchard	6^{6}	6^{6}
WC	(Australia) Storm Sanders	7^{8}	7^{8}
(Hungary) Melinda Czink	2	2
(United States) Madison Keys	6	6
(Italy) Camila Giorgi	2	3
13	(Sweden) Johanna Larsson	6	6

Second round
(Japan) Misaki Doi	6	6
WC	(Australia) Storm Sanders	2	4
(United States) Madison Keys	6	6
13	(Sweden) Johanna Larsson	2	2

Qualifying competition
(Japan) Misaki Doi	3	4
(United States) Madison Keys	6	6

==== Sixth qualifier ====
First round
6	(Czech Republic) Andrea Hlaváčková	6^{5}	6	6
(Czech Republic) Kristýna Plíšková	7^{7}	3	2
(Croatia) Mirjana Lučić-Baroni	5	6	6^{4}
(Slovakia) Jana Čepelová	7	3	7^{7}
(Italy) Karin Knapp	6	2	1
(United States) Alexa Glatch	3	6	6
(France) Stéphanie Foretz Gacon	1	6	2
11	(Russia) Svetlana Kuznetsova	6	2	6

Second round
6	(Czech Republic) Andrea Hlaváčková	6	1	4
(Slovakia) Jana Čepelová	3	6	6
(United States) Alexa Glatch	1	1
11	(Russia) Svetlana Kuznetsova	6	6

Qualifying competition
(Slovakia) Jana Čepelová	7	0	2
11	(Russia) Svetlana Kuznetsova	5	6	6
