= 2014 Apia International Sydney – Men's doubles =

Men's doubles
- 2014 Apia International Sydney

Final
- Champions: (Canada) Daniel Nestor (Serbia) Nenad Zimonjić
- Runners-up: (India) Rohan Bopanna (Pakistan) Aisam-ul-Haq Qureshi
- Score: 7–6^{(7–3)}, 7–6^{(7–3)}

Events
Singles	men	women
Doubles	men	women
← 2013 ·	Sydney International	· 2015 →

Bob Bryan and Mike Bryan were the defending champions, but lost in the quarterfinals to Lukáš Rosol and João Sousa.
Daniel Nestor and Nenad Zimonjić won the title, defeating Rohan Bopanna and Aisam-ul-Haq Qureshi in the final, 7–6^{(7–3)}, 7–6^{(7–3)}.

== Seeds ==
1. (United States) Bob Bryan / (United States) Mike Bryan (quarterfinals)
2. (India) Leander Paes / (Czech Republic) Radek Štěpánek (first round)
3. (India) Rohan Bopanna / (Pakistan) Aisam-ul-Haq Qureshi (final)
4. (Poland) Mariusz Fyrstenberg / (Poland) Marcin Matkowski (quarterfinals)

== Draw ==
=== Key ===
- Q = Qualifier
- WC = Wild card
- LL = Lucky loser
- Alt = Alternate
- SE = Special exempt
- PR = Protected ranking
- ITF = ITF entry
- JE = Junior exempt
- w/o = Walkover
- r = Retired
- d = Defaulted
- SR = Special ranking

=== Draw ===
First round
1	(United States) B Bryan (United States) M Bryan	6	7^{7}
(Poland) Ł Kubot (Sweden) R Lindstedt	3	6^{5}
(Poland) J Janowicz (Belarus) M Mirnyi	6	6^{7}	[9]
(Czech Republic) L Rosol (Portugal) J Sousa	4	7^{9}	[11]
3	(India) R Bopanna (Pakistan) A-U-H Qureshi	7^{7}	6^{2}	[10]
(Netherlands) J-J Rojer (Romania) H Tecău	6^{5}	7^{7}	[3]
(Spain) P Andújar (Spain) D Marrero	4	3
(Philippines) TC Huey (United Kingdom) D Inglot	6	6
(France) M Llodra (France) N Mahut	6	4	[9]
(Canada) D Nestor (Serbia) N Zimonjić	2	6	[11]
(Argentina) C Berlocq (Italy) A Seppi	5	7^{7}	[5]
4	(Poland) M Fyrstenberg (Poland) M Matkowski	7	6^{2}	[10]
WC	(Australia) J Duckworth (Australia) S Groth	7^{7}	6
Alt	(Russia) M Elgin (Uzbekistan) D Istomin	6^{5}	4
(France) J Benneteau (France) É Roger-Vasselin	6	6
2	(India) L Paes (Czech Republic) R Štěpánek	4	4

Quarterfinals
1	(United States) B Bryan (United States) M Bryan	6	3	[12]
(Czech Republic) L Rosol (Portugal) J Sousa	3	6	[14]
3	(India) R Bopanna (Pakistan) A-U-H Qureshi	6^{3}	7^{7}	[10]
(Philippines) TC Huey (United Kingdom) D Inglot	7^{7}	6^{5}	[3]
(Canada) D Nestor (Serbia) N Zimonjić	6	3	[10]
4	(Poland) M Fyrstenberg (Poland) M Matkowski	4	6	[8]
WC	(Australia) J Duckworth (Australia) S Groth	4	6	[6]
(France) J Benneteau (France) É Roger-Vasselin	6	1	[10]

Semifinals
(Czech Republic) L Rosol (Portugal) J Sousa	1	2
3	(India) R Bopanna (Pakistan) A-U-H Qureshi	6	6
(Canada) D Nestor (Serbia) N Zimonjić	4	7^{7}	[10]
(France) J Benneteau (France) É Roger-Vasselin	6	6^{5}	[5]

Finals
3	(India) R Bopanna (Pakistan) A-U-H Qureshi	6^{3}	6^{3}
(Canada) D Nestor (Serbia) N Zimonjić	7^{7}	7^{7}
