= Bernard Tomic =

Australian tennis player (born 1992)

- Tomic at the 2026 Wimbledon Championships
- Country (sports): Australia
- Residence: Monte Carlo, Monaco
- Born: 21 October 1992 (age 34) Stuttgart, Germany
- Height: 1.96 m (6 ft 5 in)
- Turned pro: 2008
- Plays: Right-handed (two-handed backhand)
- Coach: Sara Tomic
- Prize money: US $6,915,094

Singles
- Career record: 189–185
- Career titles: 4
- Highest ranking: No. 17 (11 January 2016)
- Current ranking: No. 185 (5 October 2026)

Grand Slam singles results
- Australian Open: 4R (2012, 2015, 2016)
- French Open: 2R (2012, 2015, 2016)
- Wimbledon: QF (2011)
- US Open: 3R (2015)

Other tournaments
- Olympic Games: 1R (2012)

Doubles
- Career record: 20–54
- Career titles: 0
- Highest ranking: No. 114 (24 July 2017)

Grand Slam doubles results
- Australian Open: 1R (2010)
- French Open: 1R (2012, 2016, 2017)
- Wimbledon: 1R (2013)
- US Open: 2R (2012, 2013)

Mixed doubles
- Career record: 2–8

Grand Slam mixed doubles results
- Australian Open: 2R (2012)

Team competitions
- Davis Cup: SF (2015)
- Hopman Cup: RR (2013, 2014)
- Last updated on: 15 October 2026.

Bernard Tomic (/ˈtɒmɪk/; Croatian: Bernard Tomić, pronounced [běrnard tômitɕ, – tǒː-]; born 21 October 1992) is an Australian professional tennis player. He has been ranked as high as world No. 17 in men's singles by the Association of Tennis Professionals (ATP). Tomic has won four singles titles on the ATP Tour.

As a junior, Tomic enjoyed a successful career in which he won an Orange Bowl title and two junior Grand Slam singles titles, the 2008 Australian Open and 2009 US Open.

As a professional, Tomic has won the 2013 Sydney International, 2014 and 2015 Colombia Open, as well as the 2018 Chengdu Open. He made a final appearance at the 2016 Mexican Open and quarterfinal appearances at the 2011 Wimbledon Championships, the 2015 Indian Wells Open, the 2015 Shanghai Masters and the 2016 Western & Southern Open.

In January 2018, Tomic was revealed as a celebrity contestant on the fourth season of the Australian version of I'm a Celebrity...Get Me Out of Here! On 30 January 2018, Tomic withdrew from the competition after three days, owing to feeling uncomfortable and depressed, thus making him one of the shortest-tenured contestants on the show globally.

Throughout his career, Tomic has been known for his controversial behaviour, including legal issues, altercations with officials and fans, and accusations of tanking during events.

== Early and personal life ==
Tomic was born in Stuttgart, Germany, on 21 October 1992. Tomic's parents, Bosnian Croat father (from Tuzla), John (Ivica) and Bosniak mother, Adisa (from Brčko), left Socialist Yugoslavia several years before his birth.

In an interview, Tomic stated that his parents "have a Croatian background". They had both been working in Germany when Tomic was born. The family migrated to Gold Coast, Queensland, Australia in 1996 when Tomic was three years old.

His younger sister Sara was a professional tennis player. Tomic was educated at Southport State School during his primary school years before taking up a sports scholarship at The Southport School for high school. In 2018 he became vegan.

Tomic has a daughter, born in April 2026, with his partner Keely Hannah.

== Career ==
=== Juniors ===
Before Tomic began competing on the ITF junior tour he stated that he would become the number one tennis player in the world, win all the majors and become Australia's youngest Davis Cup player. He also claimed he would achieve these goals by attaining the serve of Goran Ivanišević, the mind of Pete Sampras, the groundstrokes of Roger Federer and the heart of Lleyton Hewitt. In 2004, 2006 and 2007, respectively, Tomic won the 12s, 14s and 16s Orange Bowl titles —one of the most prestigious events on the junior tour.

Playing his first singles event on the ITF Junior Circuit in 2006, he qualified for the Sunsmart 18 and Under Canterbury Championships in New Zealand and went on to win the title at 13 years of age, defeating Oh Dae-soung of Korea in the final. His success continued in the following weeks, winning the next three tournaments he played in, giving him a 25-match winning streak. He was able to extend this streak to 26 at the Riad 21 junior tournament in Morocco, before falling in the round of 16 to future junior world number 1 and ATP top 50 player Ričardas Berankis.

Tomic gained direct acceptance into his first junior Grand Slam at the 2007 Australian Open boys tournament at 14 years of age, the youngest player to ever gain direct entry. He came out victorious in round one against the sixth seed José-Roberto Velasco. In the second round, he was defeated by Kevin Botti 6–3, 3–6, 6–3. In attendance for the match were Australian tennis greats Tony Roche, John Newcombe and Pat Rafter. In his second junior Grand Slam tournament at the 2007 French Open, he made his way through qualifying to reach the main draw where he triumphed in the first round. In the second round, he would lose to Ričardas Berankis 6–2, 6–3.

Tomic did not play in another tournament until August 2007, where he won the Oceania Closed Junior Championships without dropping a set. He was unable to continue his dominance at the Junior US Open, falling in the round of 16 to future top 15 ATP player, Jerzy Janowicz. Following the US Open, Tomic picked up a second title in 2007 by winning the G1 in Kentucky. He would then travel to Italy where he compiled an undefeated record in the Junior Davis Cup and lead Australia to victory in the final against Argentina with teammates Mark Verryth and Alex Sanders. Tomic finished 2007 with a junior world ranking of 23.

Tomic began 2008 by winning Nottinghill, an Australian ITF Junior event in Melbourne without dropping a set. Two days later he started his campaign for the Australian Open Juniors title as the fifth seed. He went on to win the event, defeating the 25th, 11th, eighth and top seed, before beating tenth seed Yang Tsung-hua of Taiwan in the final. His win at the age of 15 made him the youngest winner of the Australian Open Junior Boys' Championships in the Open Era.

Four months later, at Roland Garros, Tomic, the number one seed, fell in the quarterfinals to Guido Pella of Argentina, losing in two sets. At Wimbledon, Tomic was again the top seed, but fell in the semifinals to Henri Kontinen. In a notable quarterfinal match, he played another rising star, Henrique Cunha of Brazil, and came through victorious in three sets. He also finished runner-up in the Wimbledon boys' doubles with fellow Australian Matt Reid. At the 2008 US Open, Tomic lost in the first round of the boys' singles to qualifier Devin Britton of the United States in three sets, who would go on to lose in the final.

Tomic returned to junior competition at the 2009 French Open where he reached the round of 16 in the boys' singles tournament and a month later once again reached the semifinals at Wimbledon. At the 2009 US Open, however, Tomic won the junior Grand Slam title, defeating Chase Buchanan of the United States. The 2009 US Open was his last junior tournament. Despite winning two junior majors Tomic's highest junior ranking was No. 2 in the world.

Junior Grand Slam performance – Singles:

Australian Open: W (2008)
French Open: QF (2008)
Wimbledon: SF (2008, 2009)
US Open: W (2009)

=== 2008–2009: Professional debut ===
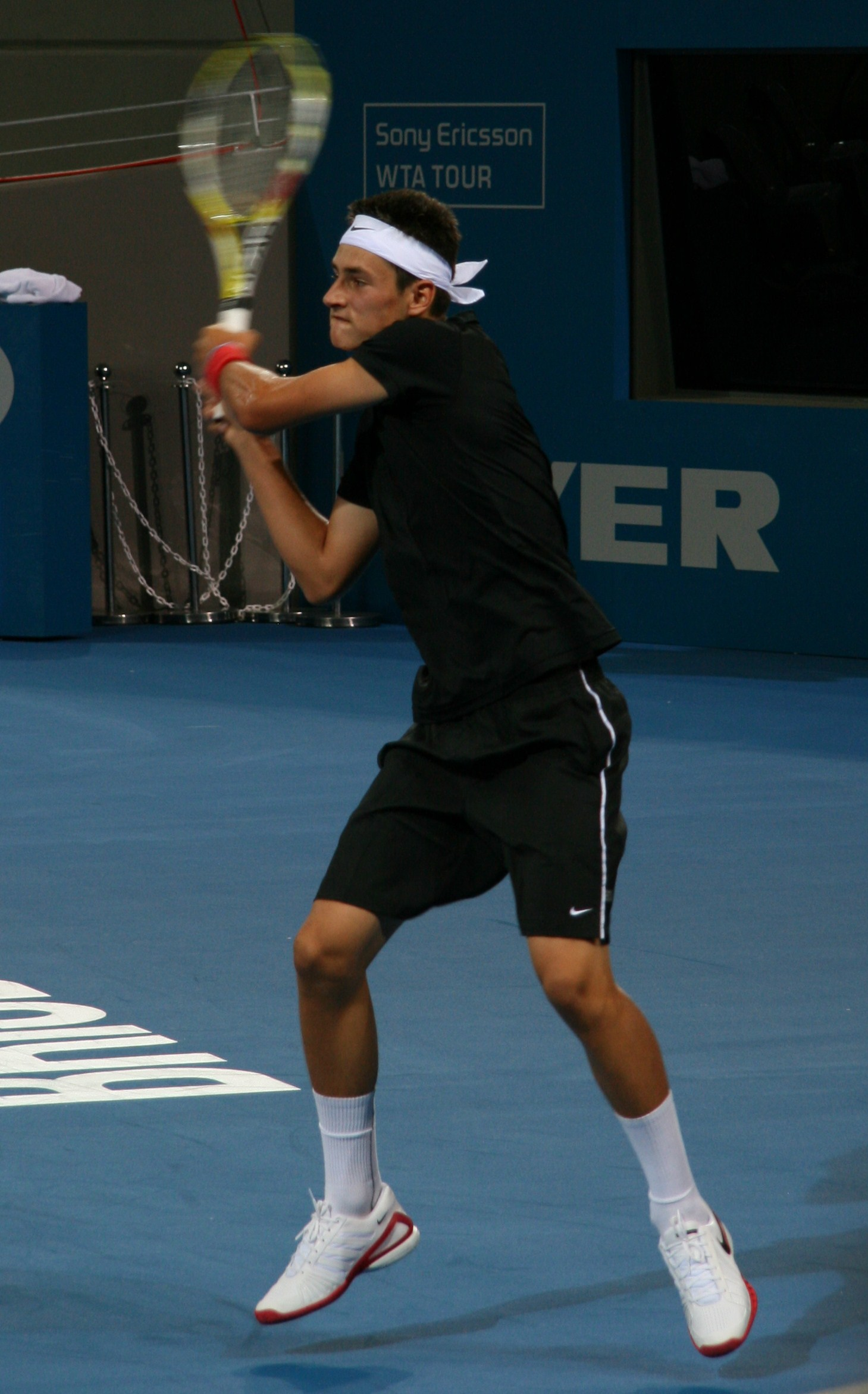
Tomic at the 2009 Brisbane International

At the age of 15, Tomic began competing in professional events. Tomic began 2008 at the Australian Open where he was given a place in the qualifying draw. He defeated Wang Yeu-tzuoo of Taiwan in the first round in three sets, after saving five match points but lost to Prakash Amritraj in the next round.

In August, Tomic reached the first professional final of his career at an F2 tournament in Indonesia. He defeated Kittipong Wachiramanowong, Peng Hsien-yin, Peerakiat Siriluethaiwattana and Kento Takeuchi en route to the final without dropping a set, before losing to Yūichi Sugita in three sets. In December, Tomic competed at a F12 tournament in Australia where he defeated fellow Australian James O'Brien in the first round before controversially walking off court whilst down a set and 3–1 against Marinko Matosevic in his next match. Towards the end of 2008, Tomic stated that he would no longer compete in junior tournaments and instead focus solely on senior tournaments. In March 2009, the ITF suspended Tomic from playing professional tournaments for a month.

In January 2009, Tomic was granted a wildcard into his first ATP Tour event, the Brisbane International, where he lost to Fernando Verdasco in the first round. He was also granted a wildcard into the 2009 Australian Open, drawing Potito Starace in the first round. He won the match, after saving two set points in the fourth-set tie-break and thus became the youngest-ever male tennis player to win a senior Australian Open Grand Slam tournament match. In the second round, he lost to Gilles Müller in four sets. Tomic also contested the mixed doubles event with fellow 16-year-old Australian Monika Wejnert but the pair lost to the Canadian pairing of Aleksandra Wozniak and Daniel Nestor in the first round.

Tomic received wildcards into Australian Challenger tournaments in Burnie and Melbourne held in February. He reached the quarterfinals in Burnie before winning his first Challenger title in Melbourne at the age of 16. He later received a wildcard into the 2009 French Open but was easily beaten by Philipp Kohlschreiber in the first round.

Following the defeat, Tomic decided to return to the junior tour to contest the Grand Slam tournaments and reached the quarterfinals of the French Open. At Wimbledon, Tomic lost in the final round of qualifying to Édouard Roger-Vasselin. He contested the junior tournament and reached the semifinals before losing to the eventual champion, Andrey Kuznetsov. In September, Tomic won the 2009 US Open junior singles title by defeating Chase Buchanan in the final. In December 2009, Tomic lost in the final of the Australian Open Wildcard Playoff to Nick Lindahl. He finished the year as the world No. 286.

=== 2010 ===
Tomic began the season by competing in the 2010 Brisbane International where he lost in the first round to qualifier Alexandr Dolgopolov. He won the World Tennis Challenge for the Australasia team, defeating Gilles Simon of team Europe, Radek Štěpánek of the Internationals team and Robby Ginepri of the Americas team. At Kooyong Classic, Tomic defeated world No. 3, Novak Djokovic, in three sets. Despite losing in the wildcard playoff, Tomic was granted a main-draw wildcard for the Australian Open where he defeated Guillaume Rufin in the first round in straight sets before losing to 14th seed Marin Čilić in the second round in five sets.

In February, Tomic qualified for the Burnie Challenger tournament in Tasmania and went on to win the event by defeating Greg Jones in the final. In March, Tomic was selected to play singles for the Australian Davis Cup Team. He won both of his matches in the tie against Chinese Taipei, defeating Yang Tsung-hua and Lee Hsin-han. He then competed at the 2010 Tennis Napoli Cup as a wildcard but lost to Paolo Lorenzi in the first round in straight sets. Tomic's next tournament was the Monte-Carlo Masters where he lost in the first round to the unseeded German Benjamin Becker. He then received a wildcard to compete in the 2010 Zagreb Open but lost to Michael Yani in the first round.

Tomic was awarded a wildcard for the Queen's Club Championships where he upset 15th seed Andreas Seppi in the first round before losing to Belgian Xavier Malisse in the second round. At Wimbledon, Tomic qualified for the main draw but lost in the first round to Mardy Fish. He then entered the qualifying draw of the US Open but lost in the second round to Noam Okun. His final ATP event of the year was the Malaysian Open where he competed as a wildcard. He lost to David Ferrer in the first round. In December 2010, Tomic withdrew from the Australian Open Wildcard Playoffs. He finished the year at a career-high singles ranking of 208.

=== 2011: Grand Slam quarterfinal ===
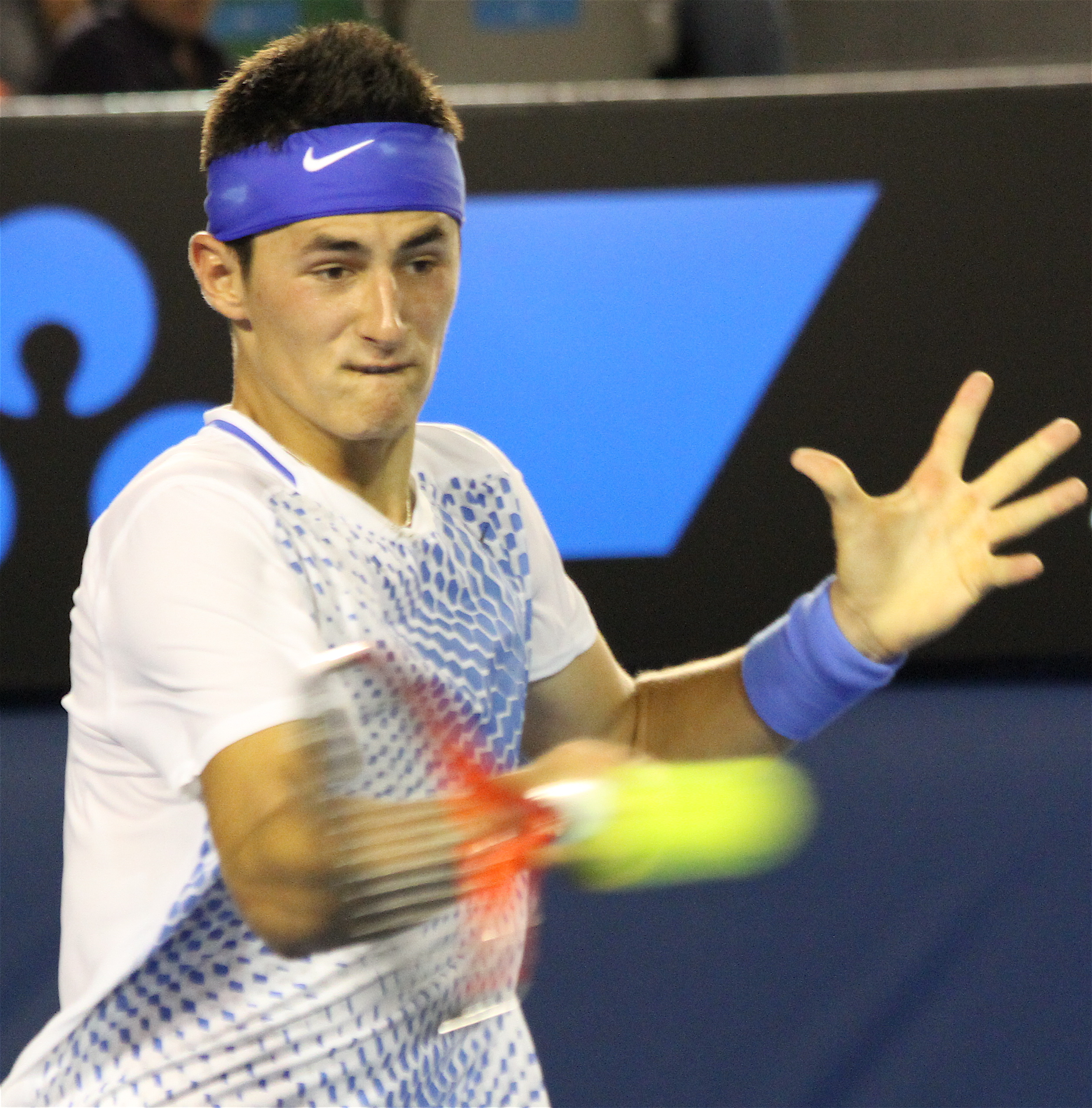
Tomic at the 2011 Australian Open

Tomic began his 2011 season at the Brisbane International, where he was given a main-draw wild card but lost to Florian Mayer in the first round. At the Sydney International, Tomic lost to Ukrainian Alexandr Dolgopolov in the first round despite taking the first set. His performance in Sydney earned him the final discretionary wildcard into the main draw of the Australian Open.

In Melbourne, Tomic matched his two prior Open performances when he defeated Jérémy Chardy in the first round. He then recorded back-to-back main-draw wins for the first time in his career when he defeated the 31st seed Feliciano López. In a much anticipated night match, Tomic lost to world No. 1, Rafael Nadal, in the third round despite having led 4–0 in the second set.

In February, Tomic competed at Indian Wells where he was given a main-draw wildcard. Tomic defeated Indian qualifier Rohan Bopanna in three sets to reach the second round of an ATP Masters 1000 tournament for the first time. He faced 16th-seeded Serbian Viktor Troicki in the second round to whom he lost in straight sets. Tomic was granted a main-draw wildcard for Miami where he lost in the first round to Pablo Andújar. At the French Open, he lost in the first round to Carlos Berlocq, in straight sets.

At the 2011 Wimbledon Championships as a qualifier, Tomic defeated 28th seed Nikolay Davydenko, Igor Andreev, fifth seed Robin Söderling and Xavier Malisse to reach his first Grand Slam singles quarterfinal, thus becoming the youngest player since Boris Becker in 1986 to reach the quarterfinals at Wimbledon. There, he lost to the eventual champion Novak Djokovic in four sets. With this showing, Tomic moved 87 places up in the ATP rankings, to No. 71 in the world.

At the Rogers Cup, Tomic won his first-round match against Lu Yen-hsun before losing to Jo-Wilfried Tsonga in the second round. He earned direct entry into the US Open, and defeated Michael Yani before losing to Marin Čilić in the second round.

Tomic then returned home to Australia to compete in the 2011 Davis Cup World Group play-offs against Switzerland. He defeated Stanislas Wawrinka in the opening match but lost his second match to world No. 3, Roger Federer. Tomic then competed at the Malaysian Open but lost in the first round to Flavio Cipolla. Tomic's next event was the Japan Open. He upset the fifth seed Victor Troicki in straight sets in the first round, and defeated Japanese wildcard Tatsuma Ito in the second, before losing to fourth seed Mardy Fish in the quarterfinals. Tomic achieved a new career-high singles ranking of 49 following the event. Tomic then entered the Shanghai Masters where despite being unseeded, he reached the third round. He defeated Kevin Anderson and fifth seed Mardy Fish before losing to Alexandr Dolgopolov. He then competed at the Stockholm Open. He defeated qualifier, Jürgen Zopp in the first round but lost to Gaël Monfils in the second round. Tomic finished the year ranked world No. 42.

=== 2012: First ATP Tour semifinal ===
Tomic began his 2012 season at the Brisbane International. He defeated Julien Benneteau, Japanese qualifier Tatsuma Ito and Denis Istomin to reach his first ATP semifinal where he lost in straight sets to world No. 4 and eventual champion, Andy Murray. He then won the 2012 Kooyong Classic, defeating Tomáš Berdych, Gaël Monfils and Mardy Fish in the final.

In the first round of the Australian Open, Tomic rallied from two sets to love down to defeat Fernando Verdasco in 4 hours and 11 minutes. He defeated Sam Querrey and Alexandr Dolgopolov in the next two rounds to reach the fourth round for the first time where he lost to Roger Federer in straight sets.

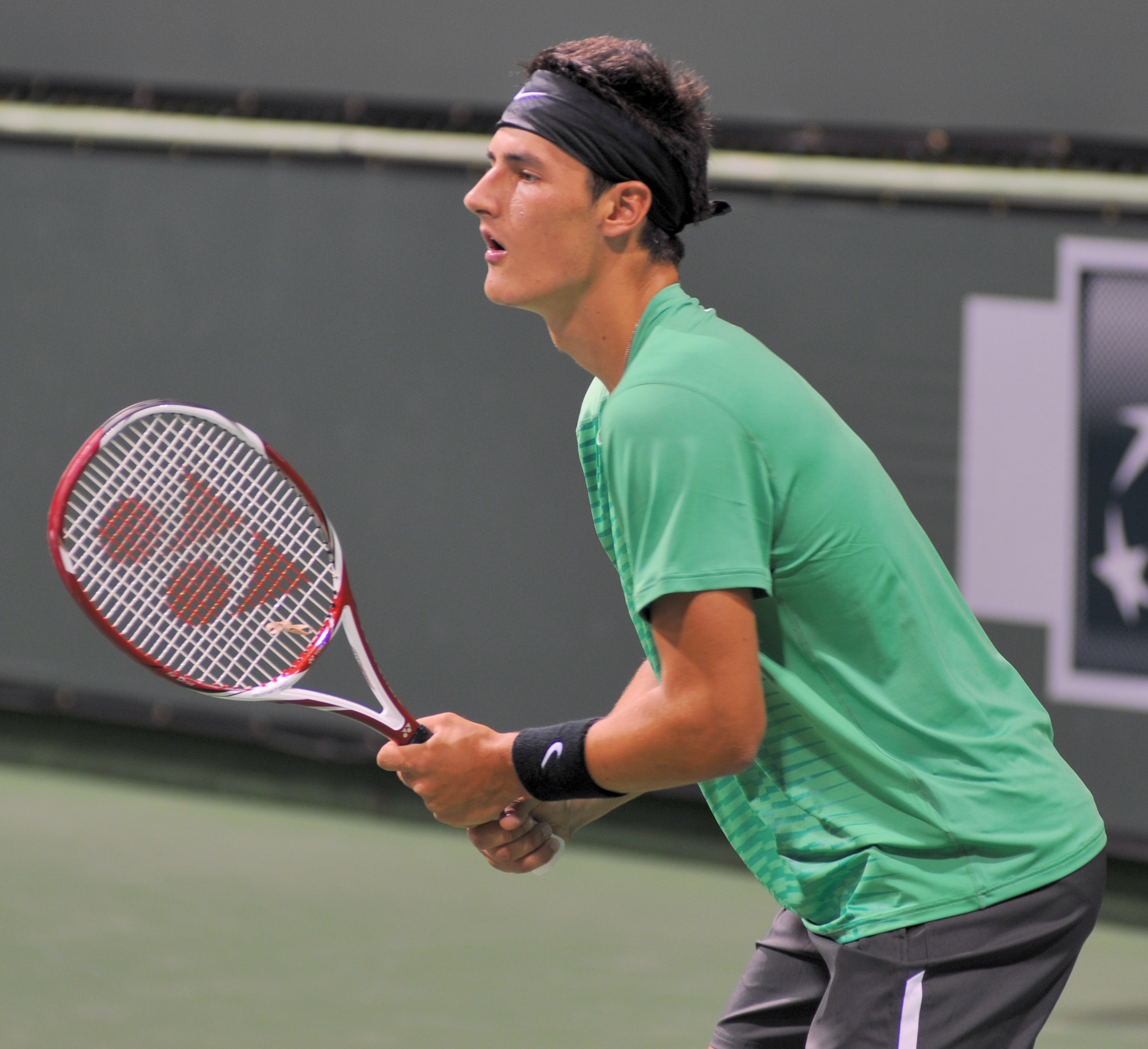
Tomic competing at the 2012 Indian Wells Open

Tomic was seeded eighth at the U.S. National Indoor Championships in Memphis, but lost to Ivan Dodig in the first round, despite having two match points. At the 2012 Delray Beach International Tennis Championships, Tomic was seeded eighth. He reached the quarterfinals but lost to the top seed John Isner. In his next event, the Indian Wells Open, Tomic suffered a first-round loss to Gilles Müller. At Miami, Tomic defeated Sergiy Stakhovsky, before losing to world No. 5 David Ferrer in the second round.

Tomic began his clay-court season at the Monte-Carlo Masters, where he advanced to the second round of a clay-court event for the first time, defeating Denis Istomin in straight sets, before losing to Alexandr Dolgopolov in three sets. At the Barcelona Open, Tomic defeated Ernests Gulbis before losing to Albert Montañés in the second round. Tomic's next event was the BMW Open where he reached the quarterfinals of a clay-court event for the first time in his career after wins over Olivier Rochus and Potito Starace. He later lost to Feliciano López. In his first-ever match at the Madrid Open, Tomic lost to Radek Štěpánek in the first round. At the Italian Open, Tomic defeated qualifier Santiago Giraldo in the first round, before losing to world No. 1 and defending champion Novak Djokovic in the second.

Tomic was seeded 25th at the French Open, marking his first appearance as a seeded player in a major tournament. He defeated qualifier Andreas Haider-Maurer in the first round but lost to Santiago Giraldo in the second round.

Tomic began his grass-court season at the 2012 Gerry Weber Open where he retired against wildcard and eventual champion Tommy Haas in the first round whilst down 5–2. Tomic was seeded fourth in his next event at Eastbourne but lost in three sets to Fabio Fognini, after receiving a first-round bye. At Wimbledon, Tomic suffered a four-set, first-round loss to David Goffin. Tomic's losing streak continued after Wimbledon as he lost to Thomaz Bellucci in the second round of the 2012 MercedesCup after a first-round bye. In his next two events, Tomic lost to Benoît Paire of France in the first round of the Suisse Open Gstaad and Kei Nishikori in the first round of the 2012 London Olympics.

Tomic snapped his seven-match losing streak at the 2012 Rogers Cup, defeating Michael Berrer in three sets, before losing to the eventual champion Novak Djokovic in the second round. The following week, Tomic reached the third round of the Cincinnati Masters, defeating Americans Ryan Harrison and Brian Baker en route, before losing to the world No. 1 and eventual champion, Roger Federer. At the US Open, Tomic progressed to the second round for the second consecutive year defeating Carlos Berlocq in four sets, before losing to former world No. 1 and 20th seed Andy Roddick in straight sets. In his first event following the US Open, Tomic advanced to the quarterfinals of the 2012 PTT Thailand Open defeating Guillermo García-López and Dudi Sela en route, before losing to second seed and eventual champion Richard Gasquet. However, Tomic did not win another match for the rest of the season, losing his opening matches in Tokyo, Shanghai and Basel. He finished the year ranked world No. 52.

=== 2013: First ATP title ===
At the 2013 Hopman Cup, Tomic defeated Tommy Haas, world No. 1 Djokovic and Andreas Seppi. Tomic's first official tournament for the year was the Sydney International. He defeated compatriot Marinko Matosevic, fifth seed Florian Mayer, defending champion Jarkko Nieminen and Andreas Seppi in the semifinals to reach his first career singles final where he defeated Kevin Anderson in three sets to win his maiden ATP title. At the Australian Open, Tomic defeated Leonardo Mayer and Daniel Brands to reach the third round where he lost to world No. 2, Roger Federer, in straight sets.

In his first match since the Australian Open, Tomic suffered a three-set loss to Grigor Dimitrov in the first round at Rotterdam. He rebounded by reaching the quarterfinals of the Open 13, defeating eighth seed Martin Kližan in the first round, after saving a match point in the deciding-set tie-break and Somdev Devvarman in the second round before losing to third seed, Jo-Wilfried Tsonga in three sets. At the Dubai Championships, Tomic retired from his first-round match against Victor Hănescu whilst trailing 3–2.

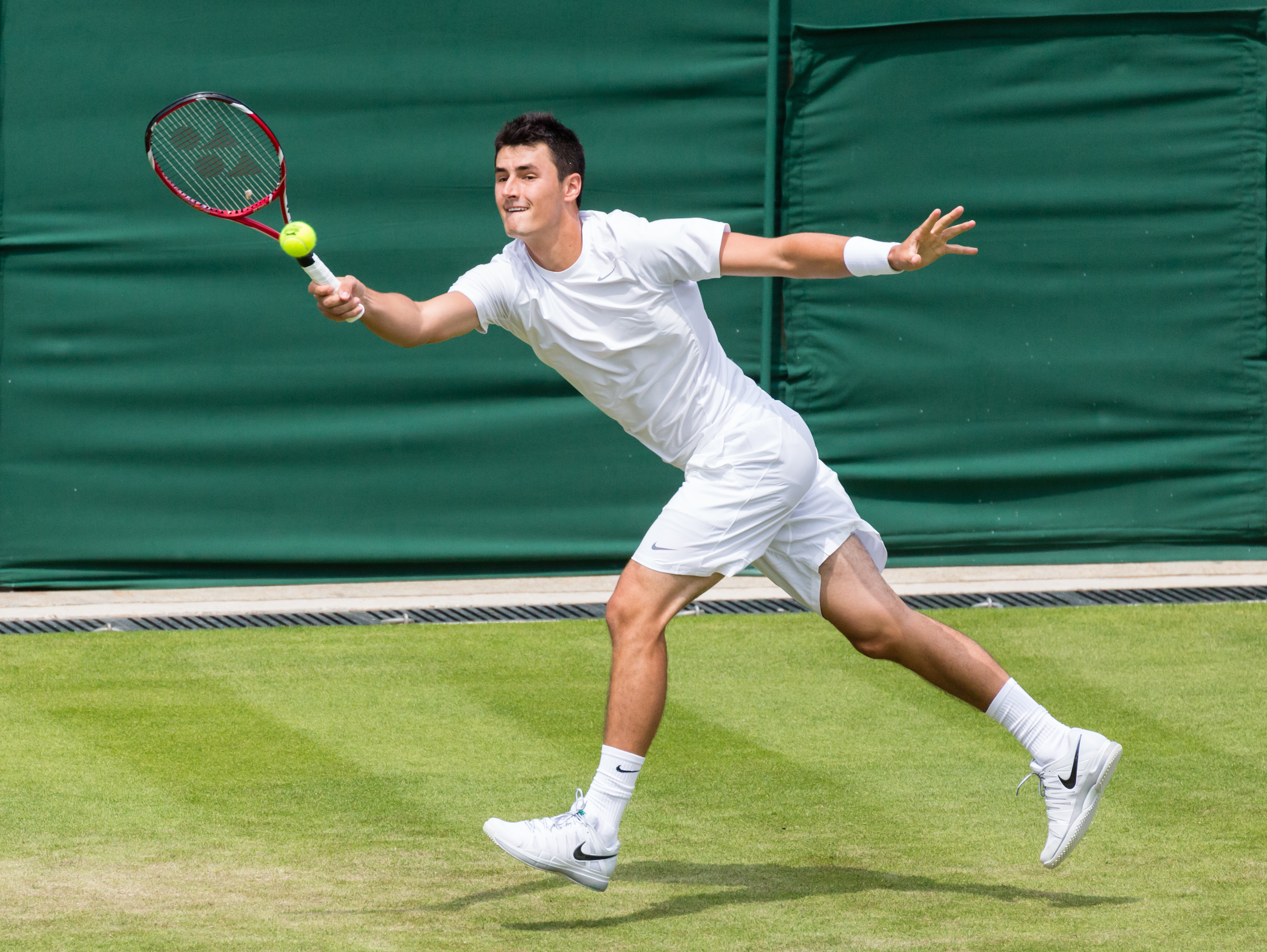
Tomic at the 2013 Wimbledon Championships

At the Indian Wells Open, Tomic defeated Thomaz Bellucci before losing to tenth seed Richard Gasquet in the second round. The following fortnight, Tomic reached the second round of the Miami Tennis, defeating Marc Gicquel in the first round before losing to world No. 3 and eventual champion, Andy Murray, in straight sets.

Tomic's first clay court tournament of the year was in Monte Carlo where he fell to Alexandr Dolgopolov in the first round. Tomic then reached the second round in Barcelona defeating Kenny de Schepper before losing to Juan Mónaco. In his next tournament, Tomic suffered a round one defeat in Madrid against Radek Štěpánek, At the French Open, his first-round match was against Victor Hănescu; however, Tomic was forced to retire at the beginning of the third set, citing a hamstring injury.

At the Eastbourne International, Tomic defeated James Ward and Julien Benneteau en route to the quarterfinals where he lost to Gilles Simon in straight sets. At Wimbledon, Tomic beat Sam Querrey in five tough sets and James Blake in straight sets before recording a huge win over ninth-seeded Richard Gasquet in the third round. In the fourth round, he lost to Tomáš Berdych in four sets.

To begin his North American hard-court season, he played in Washington. As a seeded player, he received bye through to the second round where he demolished David Goffin. In the third round, he lost to top seed and eventual champion Juan Martín del Potro. At the Rogers Cup he lost in the first round to Florian Mayer in three sets after winning the first set. At the US Open, he defeated Albert Ramos in five sets before losing to Dan Evans in the second round.

Tomic's first tournament following the US Open was in Bangkok where he defeated Ivo Karlović to reached the second round before losing to Gilles Simon. Then Tomic took part in the 2013 China Open; he defeated Zhang Ze before losing to fifth seed Richard Gasquet in the second round. This was the first of five consecutive main-draw losses, which included losing to Jérémy Chardy in Shanghai, Jack Sock in Stockholm, Mikhail Youzhny in Valencia and Feliciano López in Paris to close out his 2013 season. He finished the year ranked world No. 51.

=== 2014: Injuries, rankings slip and second ATP title ===
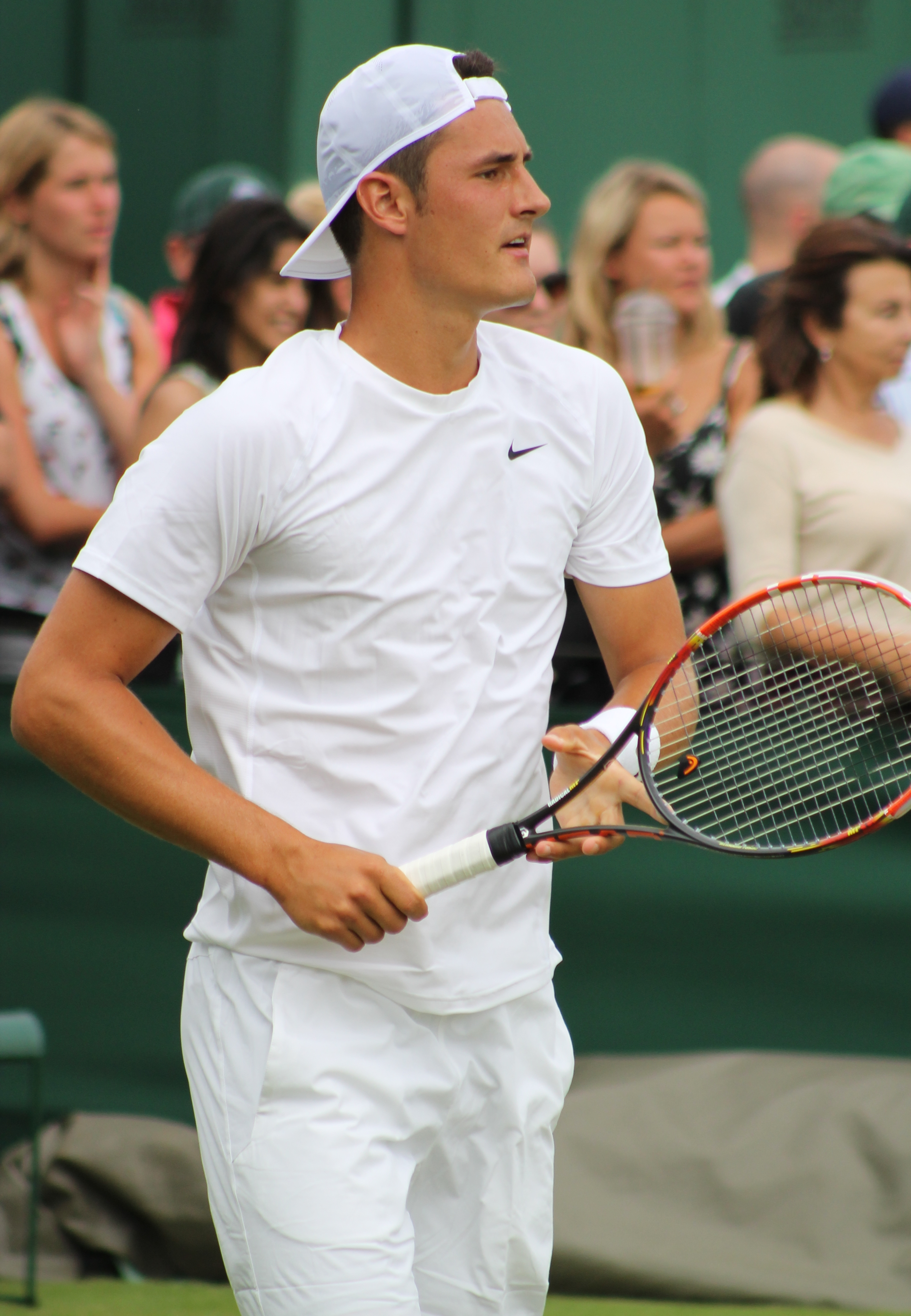
Tomic at the 2014 Wimbledon Championships

At the 2014 Hopman Cup Tomic lost to Milos Raonic but then he defeated Andreas Seppi and Grzegorz Panfil. Tomic started off his 2014 season attempting to defend his Sydney International crown. In the first round, he crushed eighth seed Marcel Granollers, dropping just three games. He then defeated to Blaž Kavčič in the three sets to reach the quarterfinals where he had a straight-sets win over Alexandr Dolgopolov. In the semifinals he faced Sergiy Stakhovsky, coming from a set down to advance to the final. In the final, he was defeated easily by world No. 6, Juan Martín del Potro. His next tournament was the 2014 Australian Open, where he retired in the first round against Rafael Nadal with a groin injury.

After undergoing two hip surgeries, Tomic returned to the tour to play at Miami, where he lost in the first round against Jarkko Nieminen in 28 minutes, winning just one game. This match was the shortest recorded professional tennis match in 'Open era' history.

Still recovering from surgery, Tomic failed to making it through qualifying in both Madrid and Rome. His next tournament was in Nice where he lost in the first round to Martin Kližan, in three sets. Tomic then played at the French Open where he lost to Richard Gasquet in straight sets.

Tomic began his grass-court season at Eastbourne where he defeated Tim Smyczek in the first round before losing to Radek Štěpánek in straight-set tie-breaks. He then competed in Eastbourne. In the first round, he had a comfortable win over Andrey Golubev to reach the second round where he fell to top seed Richard Gasquet in three sets. Tomic's next tournament was Wimbledon. In the first round he defeated Evgeny Donskoy in straight sets to set up a second-round clash with Tomáš Berdych who defeated him in four sets. As a result of the early exit, Tomic fell out of top 100 for the first time since 2011.

Due to his rankings slide, Tomic needed a wildcard to gain entry into the Colombian Open. Tomic cruised through the opening rounds, defeating Farrukh Dustov and fifth seed Alejandro Falla in straight sets. In the quarterfinals, he defeated fourth seed Vasek Pospisil in straight sets, to advance to the semifinals where he emerged victorious in a tight three-set clash over Víctor Estrella Burgos. In the final, Tomic defeated defending champion and second seed Ivo Karlović in three sets to claim his second ATP title. His successful run catapulted him back into the top 70 for the first time since February.

At the 2014 Stockholm Open, Tomic defeated Patrik Rosenholm, Kevin Anderson and Fernando Verdasco; in the semifinal, he lost to Grigor Dimitrov.

He finished the year ranked world No. 56.

=== 2015: Third ATP title and top 20 ===
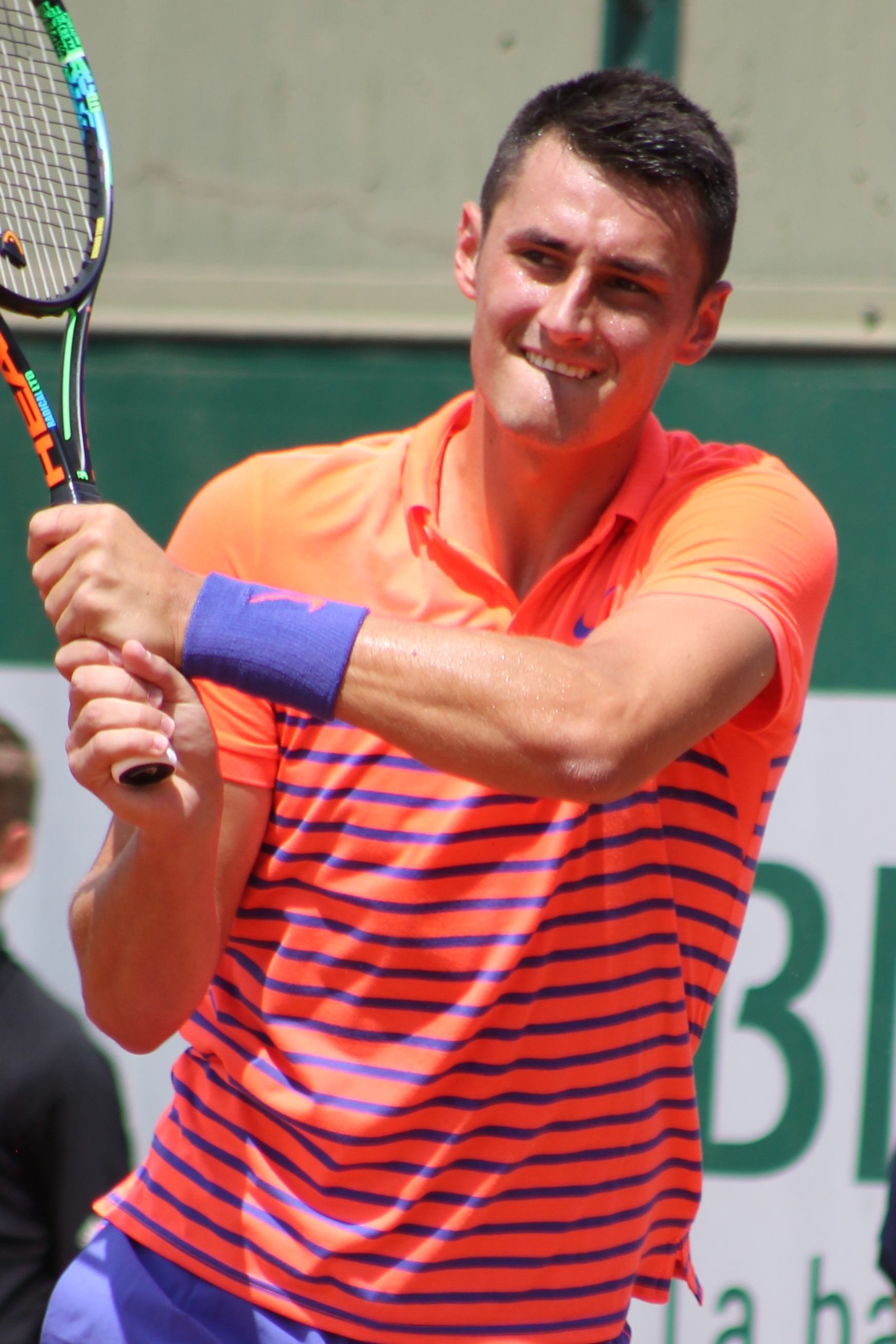
Tomic at the 2015 French Open

Tomic started the year with quarterfinal appearances in Brisbane and Sydney before falling in the fourth round of the Australian Open to Tomáš Berdych. He backed this up with quarterfinal appearances in Memphis and Acapulco and a semifinal appearance in Delray Beach in February. These included wins over seeded players including Alexandr Dolgopolov, Philipp Kohlschreiber, Viktor Troicki and Benjamin Becker. He finished the month by securing Australia a quarterfinal berth in the Davis Cup for the first time since 2006 with wins against Jiří Veselý and Lukáš Rosol.

In March, Tomic was seeded 32nd at Indian Wells where he reached his first ATP Masters 1000 quarterfinal after defeating qualifier Borna Ćorić, eighth seed David Ferrer for the first time in his career and compatriot and wildcard Thanasi Kokkinakis. However, he withdrew from his match against defending champion Djokovic due to a back injury. He then played at the Miami Open as the 25th seed. He defeated Austin Krajicek in straight sets before losing to eighth seed Tomáš Berdych in the third round despite having four match points in the second set. He then played at the Monte-Carlo Masters where he defeated Lukáš Rosol in the first round. He then faced Andreas Haider-Maurer but lost in three tight sets. Tomic next played at the BMW Open where he was the sixth seed. He lost in three sets to former world No. 8, Janko Tipsarević. Tomic then played at the Masters 1000 Madrid Open where he played Luca Vanni in round one and lost in three sets. Following this tournament he will play at the Internazionali BNL d'Italia where he lost to Viktor Troicki in three tight sets. He then played at the Nice Open where he retired against Gianni Mina after losing the first set 6–2. Tomic snapped his five match losing streak at the 2015 French Open where he was the 27th seed. He defeated Luca Vanni in four sets who he lost to in Madrid a month earlier. He then faced compatriot Thanasi Kokkinakis and despite storming to a two-set lead and having three match points in the final set, he lost the match.

Tomic began his grass-court season at the 2015 MercedesCup where he defeated Jan-Lennard Struff and Tommy Haas to reach the quarterfinals where he lost to former world No. 1, Rafael Nadal, in three tight sets. His next tournament was the 2015 Gerry Weber Open where he lost to Steve Johnson in the first round. Tomic then played at Wimbledon as the 27th seed. He opened against Jan-Lennard Struff and defeated him in five sets. He then defeated Pierre-Hugues Herbert in straight sets to reach the third round where he lost to defending champion, world No. 1, and eventual champion Novak Djokovic, in straight sets. Tomic then contested the 2015 Hall of Fame Tennis Championships as the third seed. He lost against fellow Australian and eventual semifinalist John-Patrick Smith in straight sets. He then played in Bogotá where he was the defending champion and second seed. He played Adrián Menéndez-Maceiras following a first-round bye and won in three sets to reach his 8th quarterfinal of 2015. He then defeated Tatsuma Ito in straight sets to set up a semifinal clash with Michael Berrer. He defeated Berrer in three sets to reach the final for the second straight year. He then defeated third seed Adrian Mannarino in three sets to win his third career title.

Tomic was unable to capitalize on his success, losing in the first round at the Washington Open to eventual semifinalist Steve Johnson.Tomic next played at the Canadian Masters where he defeated João Sousa, Tomic backed this up by defeating world number 8 and reigning US Open champion Marin Čilić. He then lost to defending champion and 10th seed Jo-Wilfried Tsonga. Tomic then played at the 2015 Western & Southern Open where he defeated Sergiy Stakhovsky in the first round, he then lost to eventual semifinalist Alexandr Dolgopolov. Tomic next played at the 2015 US Open as the 24th seed where he defeated Damir Džumhur in four sets. He then defeated compatriot and former champion Lleyton Hewitt in a thrilling five-set match. Tomic emerged victorious after trailing 3–5 in the final set and saving two match points to take out the match in 3 hours and 30 minutes. Tomic then played against world No. 12 Richard Gasquet and lost in straight sets. His third-round performance was his best result at the US Open to date.

Tomic then competed for Australia at the Davis Cup Semifinals and defeated Daniel Evans which saw him crack the top 20 in the rankings for the first time. Following his win he lost in straight sets to world No. 3, Andy Murray. His next tournament was the Japan Open where he retired whilst down a set against Steve Johnson. Tomic then entered the Shanghai Masters where despite being unseeded, he reached the quarterfinals. Tomic defeated Fernando Verdasco, No. 7 seed David Ferrer and Richard Gasquet, before losing to Djokovic. This was the most games any player had won against Djokovic in eight matches. The tournament scored Tomic his third top 10 win in 2015 (over David Ferrer) and was also his second Masters quarterfinal of his career. As a result of his performance, he propelled to world number 18 for the first time. Tomic next played at Stockholm as the fourth seed where he lost to Marcos Baghdatis in the second round after a first-round bye. His final tournament of the year was the Paris Masters where he defeated Fabio Fognini before losing to eventual semifinalist Stan Wawrinka in the second round. He finished the year ranked world No. 18.

=== 2016: First ATP 500 final, Masters 1000 quarterfinal ===
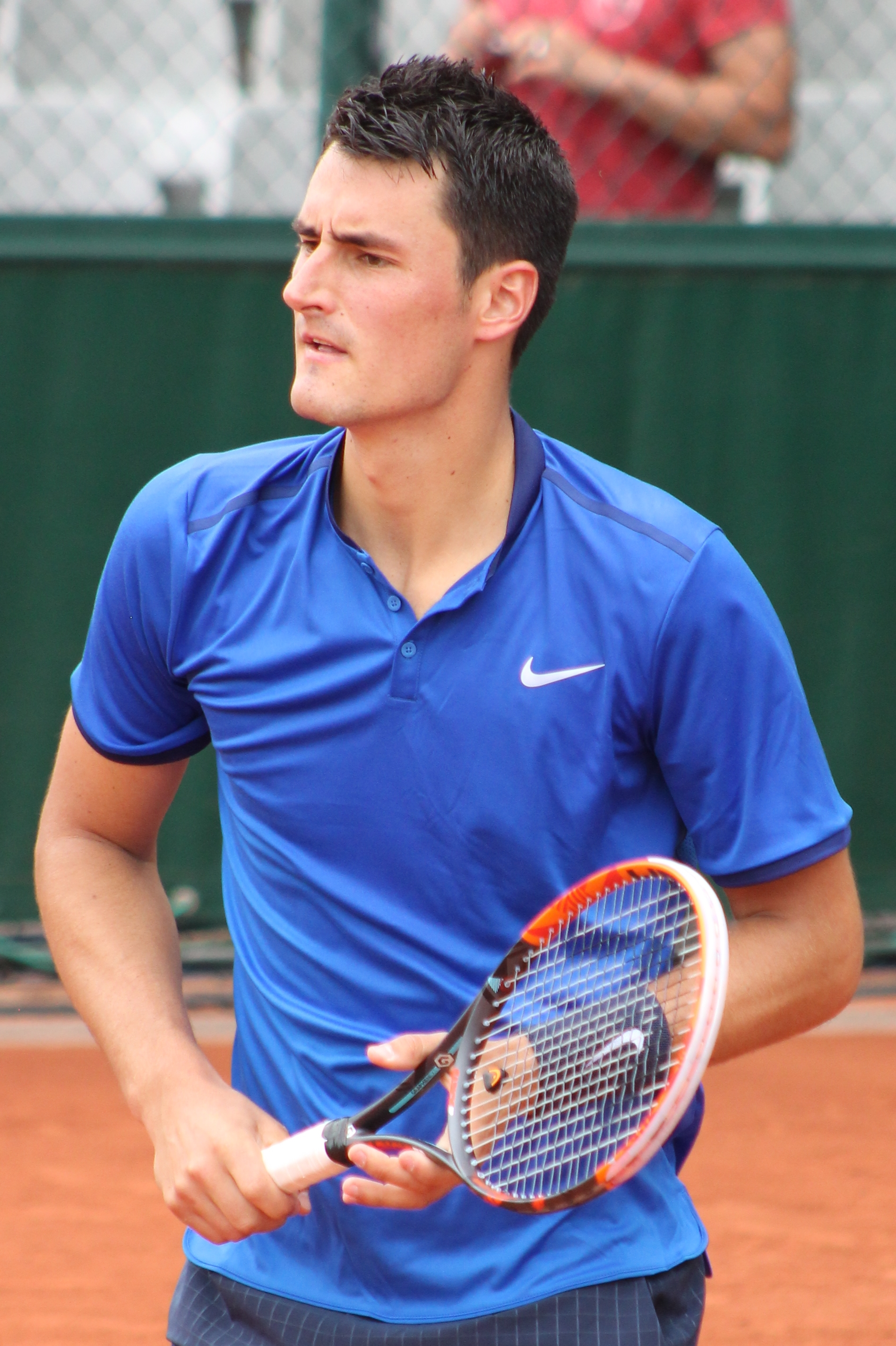
Tomic in 2016

Tomic begun his season in Brisbane as the seventh seed. He won his opening round against Nicolas Mahut before defeating Radek Štěpánek and second seed Kei Nishikori in subsequent rounds. Tomic was eliminated in the semifinals by eventual champion Milos Raonic in two tight sets. This semifinal appearance saw the Australian move up to his career-high ranking of 17th in the world. Tomic next contested the Sydney International as the top seed. He defeated Aussie wildcard Jordan Thompson in the second round (following a first-round bye). He then faced Teymuraz Gabashvili in the quarterfinals where he controversially retired while down a set and 3–0 in the second.

Tomic then participated at the 2016 Australian Open as the 16th seed. He breezed through to the fourth round with defeats over Denis Istomin, Simone Bolelli and John Millman before losing in straight sets to eventual runner-up and second seed Andy Murray. Tomic next participated at the Ecuador Open as the top seed. He defeated Roberto Carballés Baena in the second round after a first-round bye. He then lost to Paolo Lorenzi in the quarterfinals in three tight sets. Tomic next contested the Delray Beach International where he was the second seed. He lost in the first round to eventual runner-up Rajeev Ram in straight sets. The following week Tomic played at the ATP 500 tournament in Acapulco where he was the fifth seed. He was drawn against Rajeev Ram in the first round but avenged his loss from the previous week and defeated him in straight sets. He then defeated Adrian Mannarino and Illya Marchenko both in straight sets to set up a semifinal clash with Alexandr Dolgopolov. Tomic lost the first set 1–6 yet rallied back to win the match in a thrilling three-set match. He then contested his first ATP 500 final against Dominic Thiem where he lost in three sets, despite having led 5–2 in the first set. Tomic then played for Australia at the 2016 Davis Cup where they faced the United States. He won his first match against Jack Sock in four sets. However, he lost the reverse singles to John Isner which meant Australia lost in round one and therefore will face the World Group Playoffs in September.

Tomic stated before his next tournament at Indian Wells that he would miss the 2016 Miami Masters due to a wrist injury. He still played at Indian Wells as the 17th seed. For the third straight tournament he faced Rajeev Ram, again winning in straight sets. He then lost to eventual finalist Milos Raonic in the third round.

Tomic missed the Miami Masters and Monte-Carlo Masters due to his wrist injury. He then began his clay-court season at the Bucharest Open where he was the top seed. He lost in the first round to Robin Haase. His next tournament is the 2016 Istanbul Open where again he's the top seed. He lost to eventual champion Diego Schwartzman in the second round following a first-round bye. Tomic competed at the Madrid Open, but lost in straight sets to Fabio Fognini. He was criticised for giving up on match point. He turned his racket the other way around, with the handle facing forward as Fognini served for the point. He then competed at the Italian Open, but was forced to retire ten minutes in because of illness. Tomic next tournament was the French Open where he was seeded 20th. He beat Brian Baker in the first round in straight sets. However, he would lose to Borna Ćorić in the second round in four sets.

Tomic began his grass-court season at the 2016 Ricoh Open as the second seed. He beat Aljaž Bedene to reach the quarterfinals before losing to the defending and eventual champion Nicolas Mahut. He next competed at the 2016 Queen's Championships. He opened against the 2015 Queens finalist Kevin Anderson who he defeated in straight sets. He then beat Fernando Verdasco who defeated second seed Stan Wawrinka in the previous round. In the quarterfinals he defeated Gilles Müller to set up a semifinal clash with Milos Raonic where he lost to the third seed in straight sets. At the 2016 Wimbledon Championships, in the first round, Tomic beat Fernando Verdasco in five tough sets. Then he beat Radu Albot in four sets in the second round. In the third round, he beat world No. 15, Roberto Bautista Agut, in straight sets. But in the fourth round, he lost to Lucas Pouille in five sets.

To begin his North American hard-court season, he played in Washington as the No. 3 seed. He received a bye through to the second round where he defeated Donald Young. In the third round, he lost to No. 13 seed and eventual runner-up Ivo Karlović. Tomic next played at the Canadian Masters where he defeated Alejandro González and Steven Diez but then lost to Kevin Anderson in the third round. He reached the quarterfinal of the 2016 Western & Southern Open by beating former world No. 28, João Sousa, he then caused consecutive upsets by defeating the 11th seed David Goffin and the fifth seed Kei Nishikori. He then lost to world No. 2 and eventual finalist, Andy Murray, in straight sets. Then Tomic played at the US Open as the 17th seed where he lost to Damir Džumhur in four sets in the first round.

Tomic began the Asian swing at the Shenzhen Open as the fourth seed. He beat Ryan Harrison to reach the quarterfinals before losing to Thomaz Bellucci. He next participated at the 2016 China Open where he lost to Pablo Carreno Busta in the first round. Tomic also played the men's doubles, partnering Jack Sock. Despite his early singles exit, Tomic reached his first tour doubles final which included a win over the second seeds and world No. 3 Marcelo Melo who partnered Łukasz Kubot. Tomic/Sock lost in the final in a tight three-set match to the partnership of Pablo Carreño Busta/Rafael Nadal. Tomic next contests the Shanghai Masters, he lost to the 15th seed Bautista Agut in the first round.

He finished the year ranked world No. 26.

=== 2017: Rapid decline ===
Tomic commenced the year at the Brisbane International. He lost in round one to David Ferrer. At the Australian Open, Tomic defeated Thomaz Bellucci and Víctor Estrella Burgos to reach the third round where he lost to Dan Evans in straight sets. Tomic then lost in the first round at five consecutive tournaments, before defeating Dustin Brown at the Barcelona Open. At the French Open, Tomic lost in the first round in a straight-sets thumping against world No. 7 Dominic Thiem. In the lead up to Wimbledon, Tomic achieved his best result of the season when he made the quarterfinals of the Eastbourne International. At Wimbledon, Tomic was fined $15,000 (£11,500) after his first round exit against Mischa Zverev. The fine was handed out due to Tomic's comments in the press conference where he admitted that he was bored with the tournament and faked an injury. Tomic's racquet provider Head subsequently dropped him. Tomic did not play any tournaments between Wimbledon and the US Open. At the US Open, Tomic was beaten by Gilles Müller in four sets. With three consecutive first-round exits at Grand Slams and a string of poor results, Tomic's ranking dipped outside the world's top 140, his worst world ranking since 2011. In late September, Tomic returned at the Chengdu Open where he was easily beaten by Kyle Edmund in the first round. At the Japan Open in Tokyo, Tomic scored his first win on tour in three months after defeating João Sousa in the opening round. He was then beaten handily by eighth seed Diego Schwartzman.

He finished the year ranked world No. 140, a decline of 114 places from the end of 2016.

=== 2018: Rankings downfall, reality television stint and fourth ATP title ===
Following his ranking slide, Tomic entered the qualifying tournament at the Australian Open as the 29th seed. He advanced to the final round before losing to unheralded Italian Lorenzo Sonego. This marked the first time since 2008 that Tomic had failed to appear in the main draw of the Australian Open. Following his loss in qualifying, Tomic entered reality television show I'm a Celebrity...Get Me Out of Here! Tomic quit the competition after three days, proclaiming a desire to return to tennis as the primary reason, in turn having one of the shortest times on the show globally. After this, Tomic was awarded a wildcard into the 2018 Istanbul Open where he served for the match against sixth seed Viktor Troicki in the first round; however, he went on to lose the match. Tomic's hiatus coupled with poor results blew his ranking out to 243 in the world, his worst ranking since 2010. Tomic then entered a Challenger tournament in France where he scored three consecutive wins for the first time since Cincinnati in 2016. He made the final but was defeated by compatriot and top seed John Millman. The result improved his ranking to 191. Tomic then qualified for the French Open and was expected to face compatriot Nick Kyrgios in a hotly anticipated first-round match-up. Kyrgios, however, withdrew before the tournament from an elbow injury, leaving Tomic to face lucky loser Marco Trungelliti. Tomic went on to lose the match in four sets.

Following the French Open, Tomic qualified for the Rosmalen Grass Court Championships in the Netherlands, where he made a surprise run to the semifinals, losing to eventual champion Richard Gasquet in three sets. This was Tomic's first appearance in an ATP Tour semifinal in more than two years. The result moved Tomic back inside the world's top 150. Tomic then attempted to qualify for Wimbledon, but lost in the final round of qualification to second seed Ruben Bemelmans. He gained entry into the main draw as a lucky loser, however, after Roberto Bautista Agut withdrew from the tournament. Tomic defeated fellow lucky loser Hubert Hurkacz in the first round to earn his first Grand Slam main-draw win since the 2017 Australian Open. He went on to lose to the 24th seed Kei Nishikori in four sets in the second round. Tomic then suffered a string of poor results in his next four tournaments, failing to win a main-draw match at any event. His poor form carried over to the US Open, where he lost in the first round of qualifying to fellow Australian Thanasi Kokkinakis and was accused of tanking. Tomic then returned to the Challenger Tour at the inaugural Rafa Nadal Open, where he won the tournament as the sixth seed. This was Tomic's first title of any kind in three years and first Challenger title in eight years. In late September, Tomic qualified for and won the Chengdu Open, defeating top-seeded Fabio Fognini in the final. Tomic saved four match points against Fognini in what was his first ATP World Tour tournament victory in three years. The win moved Tomic back inside the top 100 at world No. 76, his best ranking since July 2017.

Tomic then attempted to qualify for the Stockholm Open, but was forced to retire due to an injury in the first round of qualifying against Oscar Otte. Tomic played no further tournaments in 2018 and finished the year ranked world No. 83.

=== 2019: Severe downfall in form and ranking ===
Tomic started off his 2019 season with a first-round loss at the Australian Open to world No. 7, Marin Čilić. Two months later at the Miami Masters, he played world No. 1 Novak Djokovic in the second round and lost in straight sets.

Tomic made no ATP final or semifinal appearances during the year and only made two ATP quarterfinal appearances. The first one came at the Antalya Open where he defeated seventh seed Andreas Seppi in the first round but lost to fourth seed Pablo Carreño Busta in three sets. The second one came at the Atlanta Open where he defeated 5th seed Frances Tiafoe in the first round but lost to third seed and eventual champion Alex de Minaur after retiring in the second set.

At the Chengdu Open, Tomic entered the qualifying draw as the defending champion of the tournament but lost in first round of qualifying to 2017 champion Denis Istomin, after retiring in the second set. Because of his failure to defend all 250 ranking points from the previous edition, Tomic's ranking dropped significantly from 109 to 191.

Tomic finished the year with a year-end ranking of 185, a significant drop from his ranking of 83 at the beginning of the year.

=== 2020: Inactivity due to COVID-19 ===
After starting off the year with a first-round loss at the Australian Open qualifying to seventh seed Denis Kudla, Tomic only played one ATP tournament in 2020 at the Delray Beach Open where he lost in the qualifying competition to Ernests Gulbis but received a lucky loser spot and lost in the first round to Cedrik-Marcel Stebe in straight sets.

After the COVID-19 pandemic suspended tennis in March, Tomic decided to stay inactive for the rest of the year even when tennis returned in August.

=== 2021: Australian Open second round ===
Tomic returned to playing tennis at the Australian Open qualifying. There, he defeated 14th seed Jozef Kovalík, Tristan Schoolkate and John-Patrick Smith to qualify for his first Grand Slam tournament in close to two years at the Australian Open. There, he played Yūichi Sugita and won after Sugita retired in the third set to mark his first grand slam match win in close to three years. In the second round, he played 11th seed Denis Shapovalov and lost in straight sets. He finished 2021 ranked world No. 260.

=== 2022: First match win since 2021 Wimbledon qualifying ===
Tomic lost in the first round of the Australian Open qualifying to Roman Safiullin. Tomic complained to the umpire about the lack of COVID-19 testing at the Australian Open, and tested positive for the virus two days after the loss.

Tomic's next tournament was the Monterrey Challenger in March, where he recorded his first match win at any level since the qualifying rounds at 2021 Wimbledon by beating fourth seed Cedrik-Marcel Stebe in straight sets.

=== 2023–2026: Lincoln Challenger title; Top 175 return; first ATP quarter-final since 2019 ===
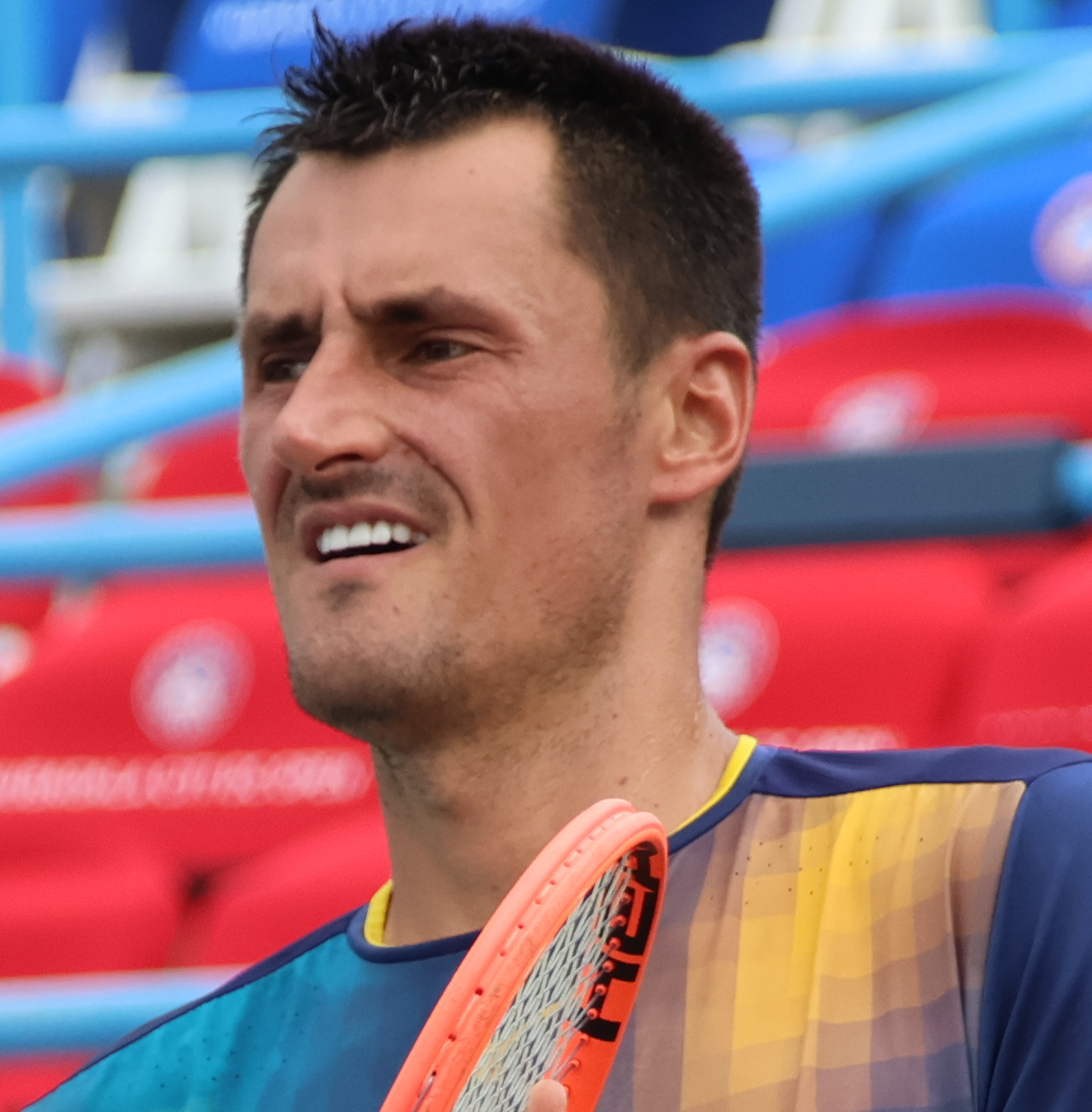
Tomic at the 2025 Washington Open

In 2023, after losing in the final of a Futures tournament in Doha, Tomic qualified for the Monterrey Challenger. There, he reached his first Challenger quarterfinal since 2018 after defeating Juan Pablo Ficovich and upsetting second seed Emilio Gómez while saving two match points. He eventually lost to Mitchell Krueger in the quarterfinals, losing 6–4 in the first set before retiring a break down in the second. He returned to top 300, for the first time in nearly two years, with a title at the M15 Futures tournament in Las Vegas where he beat Thai-Son Kwiatkowski in the final.

In July 2026, Tomic won 2026 Lincoln Challenger by defeating Estonian Mark Lajal in three sets in the final. Consequently, he returned to the No. 171 spot in the singles rankings on July 27, 2026.

Playing in the first round as a lucky loser at the 2026 Los Cabos Open, Tomic recorded his first tour-level hard-court win since 2021, defeating Mexican Alex Hernández 6–1, 6–0 in just 46 minutes. In the second round Tomic upset No. 4 seed Karen Khachanov in straight sets to reach his first tour-level quarter-final since 2019. He lost his quarter-final match against fifth-seeded Cameron Norrie in straight sets in just 50 minutes, winning the opening game of the match before losing the next 12 in a row.

In October, Tomic qualified for the 2026 Shanghai Masters, making his first main-draw appearance at the tournament since 2016 and his first at an ATP Masters 1000 event since the Canadian Open in 2019. He lost to Matteo Arnaldi in straight sets in the first round.

== National representation ==
=== Davis Cup (17–4) ===
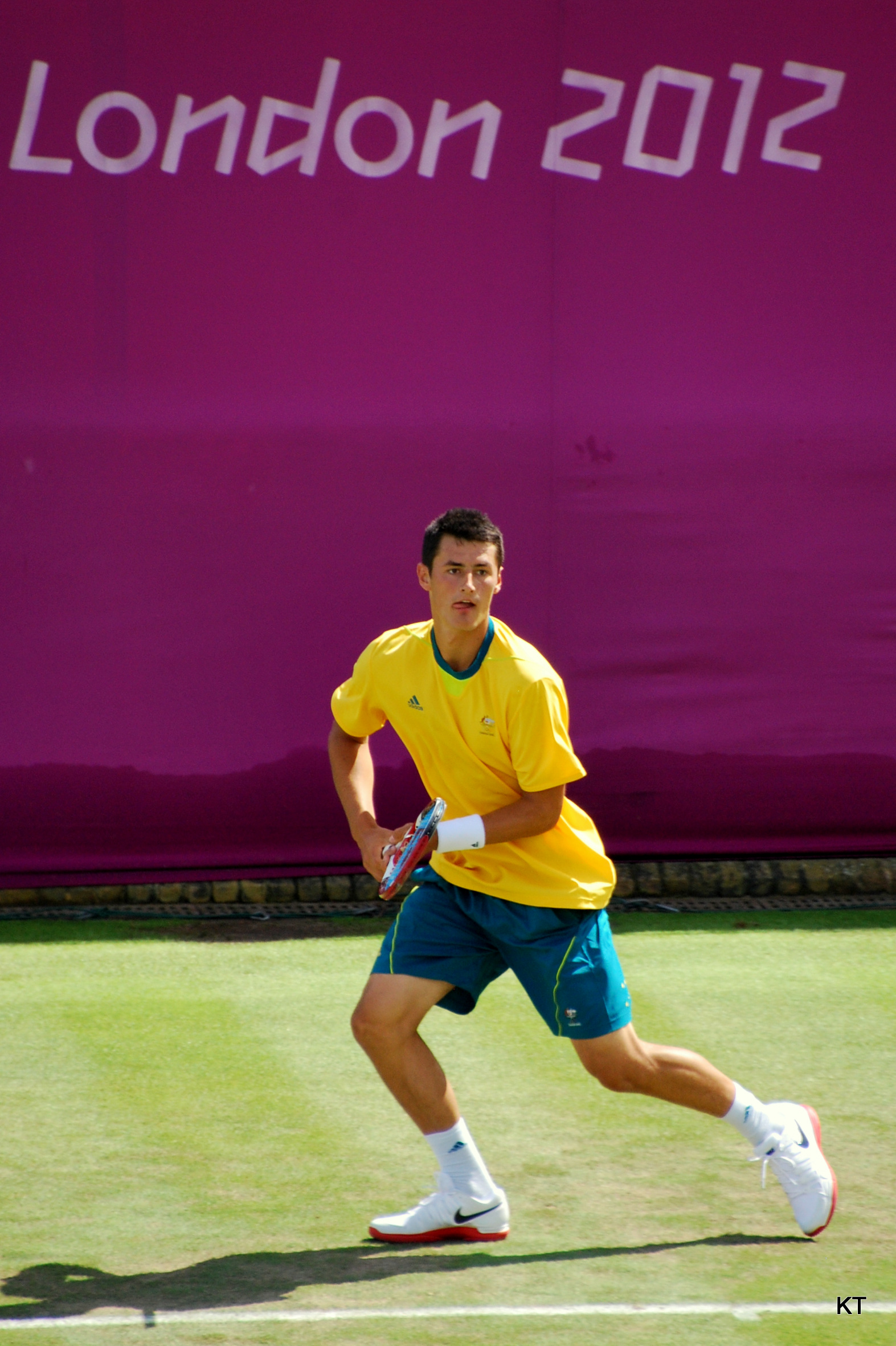
Tomic competing for Australia at the 2012 Olympics

Tomic made his Davis Cup debut for Australia in Melbourne against Chinese Taipei in 2010 at the age of 17 years and 135 days, the youngest-ever player for Australia. In the first rubber of the tie Tomic defeated Yang Tsung-hua. In the fifth rubber he picked up another victory over Lee Hsin-han.

Tomic was called back into the team in July 2011 for the tie against China. Following a shock loss in the first match, Tomic drew Australia level in the second rubber of the tie against Zhang Ze. Tomic's reverse singles match was cancelled due to Australia winning the tie 3–1. In September 2011 at the Davis Cup World Group Playoffs Tomic pulled off the biggest scalp of his Davis Cup career by defeating world No. 19, Stanislas Wawrinka, in four sets. In the reverse rubber, Tomic faced his childhood hero Roger Federer, losing in four sets.

Prior to the commencement of the 2012 ATP season, Tomic and Lleyton Hewitt both committed to the Davis Cup team for all ties in a bid to re-enter the world group. In the second rubber of the first zonal tie against China, Tomic was victorious against Wu Di. In the second zonal tie of 2012, he recorded two straight-sets victories in a 5–0 rout of South Korea. In the 2012 Davis Cup World Group Playoffs, Tomic was victorious in his first rubber against Cedrik-Marcel Stebe in four sets but fell to Florian Mayer in straight sets which would see Australia lose to Germany 3–2 overall.

Following poor off court behaviour in late 2012, Tomic was suspended from playing for Australia in the first round of the 2013 Davis Cup competition. After serving a one-tie ban, Tomic returned to the Australian Davis Cup team in their 2013 zonal semifinal against Uzbekistan and later that year was instrumental in Australia's return to the World Group after an away playoff victory over Poland. Injuries prevented Tomic from competing in the Davis Cup competition in 2014 but he returned for Australia's first round of the 2015 Davis Cup against the Czech Republic. Despite facing the two-time defending champions away, Tomic secured two crucial singles victories and led Australia to a 3–2 victory over the Czech Republic. It was the first time Australia had reached the second round of the Davis Cup world group since 2006. Tomic was then once again suspended from the Australian Davis Cup team for an outburst during a Wimbledon press conference. Tomic returned to the team once again in the 2015 semifinal against Great Britain and scored a crucial four-set victory over Dan Evans in the second rubber. Tomic played for Australia at the 2016 Davis Cup where they faced the United States. He won his first match against Jack Sock in four sets. However, he lost the reverse singles to John Isner which meant Australia lost in the first round.

=== Olympics (0–1) ===
Tomic represented Australia in his maiden Olympics at London 2012. He competed in the singles competition against Japan's 15th seed Kei Nishikori in the first round, but fell in two straight tie-breaks.

=== Hopman Cup (5–1) ===
At the 2013 Hopman Cup Tomic defeated Tommy Haas (7–6, 3–6, 7–5), World No. 1 Novak Djokovic (6–4, 6–4) and Andreas Seppi (6–3, 7–5). Australia finished in 2nd place in the group.

At the 2014 Hopman Cup Tomic lost to Milos Raonic (6–7, 1–6) but then he defeated Andreas Seppi (4–6, 6–3, 6–2) and Grzegorz Panfil (6–1, 6–4). Australia team finished in last place in the group.

=== World Tennis Challenge (3–0) ===
In 2010, Tomic won the World Tennis Challenge for the Australasia team. Tomic won all three singles matches, defeating Gilles Simon, Radek Štěpánek and Robby Ginepri.

=== Fast 4 Tennis Showdown (1–0) ===
On 9 January 2017, Bernard Tomic defeated Dominic Thiem 3–4, 4–2, 4–3, 3–4, 5–3 to win the event. Before this match, Nick Kyrgios defeated Rafael Nadal 4–3, 2–4, 4–3 4–3. With Australia leading 2–0, the doubles were not played.

== Coaching ==
Tomic was first coached by Gold Coast tennis instructor Neil Guiney at age 7. As a child Tomic was officially coached by his father, John, at Queens Park Tennis Centre on the Gold Coast. Despite his father never having played tennis, he continues to coach Tomic. In November 2012 it was revealed that Tomic had approached Australian tennis legend Pat Cash to coach him on a full-time basis. Cash declined the offer. As of 2016, Tomic was training out of Koza World of sports tennis academy with Australian coach Gavin Hopper. According to his ATP profile page, he is currently coached by his sister, Sara Tomic.

== Equipment and sponsors ==
In March 2006, a 13-year-old Tomic signed a six-figure deal with sports marketing and management giant IMG. Prior to joining the ITF juniors tour in 2007, Tomic played with Wilson racquets but switched to Head when he debuted on the junior tour. At the beginning of the 2012 ATP season Tomic signed a deal to use Yonex racquets. Bernard again switched to Head racquets, but was later dropped by the racquet manufacturer following a post-match press conference at the 2017 Wimbledon.

He previously held a long-standing sponsorship deal with Nike, before switching to Lacoste in 2018. Tomic wore Lotto clothing during the 2018 French Open qualifying, but was wearing Lacoste by the main draw. Tomic wore Mizuno clothing for the first time at the start of the 2019 season.

== Controversies ==
At the 2009 Wimbledon Championships, at which Tomic was contesting the junior event, Lleyton Hewitt contacted the Tomic camp inviting Bernard to practice. Hewitt's physiotherapist Iván Gutiérrez was told by Tomic's agent: "No, he's not hitting with Lleyton; Lleyton's not good enough."

In January 2012, he was fined by the police on the Gold Coast three times in one day. Later that day he also ran from the police and locked himself in his house. In November 2012, Tomic pleaded guilty in court to failing to stop for police in his orange BMW M3 and was fined $750, as well as being put on a 12-month good-behaviour bond. Tomic accused a police officer of trying to hit him. He was also found guilty of three other traffic offences committed in January and was fined a further $1,000.

While competing at the 2012 Miami Masters, Tomic was overheard making a request to the chair umpire for his father to be ejected from the stands. He was heard saying: "He's annoying. I know he's my father but he's annoying me. I want him to leave but how's that possible?"

At the same event, qualifier Dan Evans had booked to practise with Tomic, but was told by Tomic's father that he was not good enough. Evans went on to win the pair's first career meeting the following year.

In 2013, Bernard's father John Tomic was sentenced to eight months in prison and banned from the ATP World Tour for 12 months for headbutting and breaking the nose of Bernard's hitting partner, Thomas Drouet. However, he did not serve the jail term, as under Spanish law, there was a discount for his first conviction if the sentence is less than two years.

During his third-round press conference, following his loss to top seed Novak Djokovic at the 2015 Wimbledon Championships, Tomic ranted against Tennis Australia, namely Craig Tiley, Pat Rafter and Steve Healy. Tomic was angry from what he perceived as a lack of support, respect and funding for both him and his sister, Sara. As a result, Tennis Australia dropped Tomic from Australia's Davis Cup team for their quarterfinal tie against Kazakhstan.

In July 2015, Tomic was arrested in Miami and charged with resisting arrest and trespassing. In October, all charges were dropped against Tomic.

In his first-round match at the 2016 Madrid Masters, Tomic reversed his racquet on return of serve whilst defending match point. This also brought up past tanking allegations against Tomic from matches at the 2016 Sydney International and 2012 US Open.

In the 2016 US Open, during his first-round loss to Damir Džumhur, he verbally abused a spectator after apparently being taunted.

In an interview with Channel 7's Sunday Night program, Tomic admitted that he never loved tennis and says that he has built his career on 50% effort.

After Tomic failed to qualify for the 2018 Australian Open, losing to Lorenzo Sonego, Tomic was asked about the impact of the loss on his career, to which he replied "I just count money, that's all I do. I count my millions". His comments drew criticism from former players and the public, with Andy Roddick tweeting "Maybe stop for a second and think of the millions you've left on the table."

After losing his opening match of the 2019 Wimbledon Championships to Jo-Wilfried Tsonga in 58 minutes, Tomic was fined his full prize money of £45,000 for not meeting the "required professional standard" according to the match referee. The requirement to "perform to a professional standard" is specified in the Grand Slam Rulebook, Article III section G, and provides for a greater fine than "Best Efforts" in section C. The incident has revived news reports of Tomic's old nickname "Tomic the Tank Engine." ("Tanking" usually referring to the refusal to use one's best efforts to win).

After competing in Mexico and travelling to Miami during March 2020, Tomic reportedly experienced symptoms of COVID-19, and subsequently entered self-isolation. However, Andrea Petkovic later claimed that Tomic had lied about his health.

At the Santo Domingo Challenger in August 2024, Tomic was removed from the stands at the final between Andres Andrade and Damir Džumhur after heckling Andrade who defeated him in the quarterfinals earlier in the week.

=== Match fixing investigation ===
In January 2025, it was revealed that Tomic had been investigated by NSW police strike force Whyman for suspected match fixing in connection with two matches taking place in late 2021 and early 2022. The investigations by police and the International Tennis Integrity Agency were closed due to lack of evidence.

== Career statistics ==
=== Grand Slam performance timeline ===
Key
W	F	SF	QF	#R	RR	Q#	DNQ	A	NH

(W) winner; (F) finalist; (SF) semifinalist; (QF) quarterfinalist; (#R) rounds 4, 3, 2, 1; (RR) round-robin stage; (Q#) qualification round; (DNQ) did not qualify; (A) absent; (NH) not held; (SR) strike rate (events won / competed); (W–L) win–loss record.
To avoid confusion and double counting, these charts are updated at the conclusion of a tournament or when the player's participation has ended.

Tournament	2008	2009	2010	2011	2012	2013	2014	2015	2016	2017	2018	2019	2020	2021	2022	2023	2024	2025	2026	SR	W–L	Win%
Australian Open	Q2	2R	2R	3R	4R	3R	1R	4R	4R	3R	Q3	1R	Q1	2R	Q1	A	A	Q1	Q2	0 / 11	18–11	62%
French Open	A	1R	A	1R	2R	1R	1R	2R	2R	1R	1R	1R	A	Q1	A	A	A	Q2	Q2	0 / 10	3–10	23%
Wimbledon	A	Q3	1R	QF	1R	4R	2R	3R	4R	1R	2R	1R	NH	Q2	A	A	A	A	Q2	0 / 10	14–10	58%
US Open	A	A	Q2	2R	2R	2R	2R	3R	1R	1R	Q1	A	A	A	A	A	A	Q2	Q1	0 / 7	6–6	50%
Win–loss	0–0	1–2	1–2	7–4	5–4	6–4	2–3	8–4	7–4	2–4	1–2	0–3	0–0	1–1	0–0	0–0	0–0	0–0	0–0	0 / 38	41–37	53%
