= 2013 Apia International Sydney – Women's doubles =

Women's doubles
- 2013 Apia International Sydney

Final
- Champions: (Russia) Nadia Petrova (Slovenia) Katarina Srebotnik
- Runners-up: (Italy) Sara Errani (Italy) Roberta Vinci
- Score: 6–3, 6–4

Events
Singles	men	women
Doubles	men	women
- Sydney International

Květa Peschke and Katarina Srebotnik were the defending champions, but decided not to participate together.
Peschke played alongside Anna-Lena Grönefeld, but lost to Sara Errani and Roberta Vinci in the quarterfinals, while Srebotnik partnered up with Nadia Petrova.
Srebotnik successfully defended her title, defeating Errani and Vinci in the final, 6–3, 6–4.

== Seeds ==
1. (Italy) Sara Errani / (Italy) Roberta Vinci (final)
2. (Czech Republic) Andrea Hlaváčková / (Czech Republic) Lucie Hradecká (semifinals)
3. (Russia) Maria Kirilenko / (United States) Lisa Raymond (quarterfinals)
4. (United States) Liezel Huber / (India) Sania Mirza (quarterfinals)

== Draw ==
Key

- Q = Qualifier
- WC = Wild card
- LL = Lucky loser
- Alt = Alternate
- ITF = ITF entry
- PR = Protected ranking
- SR = Special ranking
- SE = Special exempt
- JE = Junior exempt
- JR = Junior Accelerator Programme entrant
- CO = College Accelerator Programme entrant
- NG = Next Gen Accelerator Program entrant
- w/o = Walkover
- r = Retired
- d = Defaulted

=== Draw ===
First round
1	(Italy) S Errani (Italy) R Vinci	6	6
(South Africa) N Grandin (Czech Republic) V Uhlířová	2	1
(Spain) N Llagostera Vives (China) J Zheng	6	4	[2]
(Germany) A-L Grönefeld (Czech Republic) K Peschke	4	6	[10]
3	(Russia) M Kirilenko (United States) L Raymond	7	6
(New Zealand) M Erakovic (Russia) E Makarova	5	4
(Croatia) D Jurak (Hungary) K Marosi	2	6	[10]
WC	(Australia) A Myers (Australia) S Sanders	6	4	[4]
(Germany) J Görges (Slovakia) D Hantuchová	1	3
(Russia) N Petrova (Slovenia) K Srebotnik	6	6
(Slovakia) D Cibulková (Czech Republic) L Šafářová	6	0	[9]
4	(United States) L Huber (India) S Mirza	1	6	[11]
(Chinese Taipei) H-c Chan (Poland) A Rosolska	2	6^{6}
(Russia) A Panova (Kazakhstan) G Voskoboeva	6	7^{8}
(United States) R Kops-Jones (United States) A Spears	6^{4}	5
2	(Czech Republic) A Hlaváčková (Czech Republic) L Hradecká	7^{7}	7

Quarterfinals
1	(Italy) S Errani (Italy) R Vinci	7	2	[18]
(Germany) A-L Grönefeld (Czech Republic) K Peschke	5	6	[16]
3	(Russia) M Kirilenko (United States) L Raymond	4	2
(Croatia) D Jurak (Hungary) K Marosi	6	6
(Russia) N Petrova (Slovenia) K Srebotnik	6	7
4	(United States) L Huber (India) S Mirza	2	5
(Russia) A Panova (Kazakhstan) G Voskoboeva	2	4
2	(Czech Republic) A Hlaváčková (Czech Republic) L Hradecká	6	6

Semifinals
1	(Italy) S Errani (Italy) R Vinci	7	6
(Croatia) D Jurak (Hungary) K Marosi	5	4
(Russia) N Petrova (Slovenia) K Srebotnik	6	6
2	(Czech Republic) A Hlaváčková (Czech Republic) L Hradecká	4	3

Final
1	(Italy) S Errani (Italy) R Vinci	3	4
(Russia) N Petrova (Slovenia) K Srebotnik	6	6
