= 2011 Medibank International Sydney – Women's singles qualifying =

Women's singles qualifying
- 2011 Medibank International Sydney

Events
Singles	men	women
Doubles	men	women
← 2010 ·	Medibank International Sydney	· 2012 →

== Players ==
=== Seeds ===
1. (Czech Republic) Petra Kvitová (withdrew due to playing in the final match in Brisbane)
2. (Slovenia) Polona Hercog (first round)
3. (Argentina) Gisela Dulko (first round)
4. (Russia) Ekaterina Makarova (qualifier)
5. (Switzerland) Timea Bacsinszky (first round)
6. (Russia) Vera Dushevina (second round)
7. (Czech Republic) Iveta Benešová (second round)
8. (Czech Republic) Barbora Záhlavová-Strýcová (qualifier)
9. (Austria) Sybille Bammer (qualifying competition, lucky loser)
10. (Spain) Anabel Medina Garrigues (second round)
11. (United States) Varvara Lepchenko (first round)
12. (Serbia) Bojana Jovanovski (qualifier)

=== Qualifiers ===
1. (Czech Republic) Barbora Záhlavová-Strýcová
2. (France) Virginie Razzano
3. (Czech Republic) Lucie Hradecká
4. (Russia) Ekaterina Makarova
5. (Czech Republic) Sandra Záhlavová
6. (Serbia) Bojana Jovanovski

=== Lucky losers ===
1. (Austria) Sybille Bammer

== Qualifying draw ==
=== First qualifier ===
First round
1	(Czech Republic) Petra Kvitová
(Ukraine) Olga Savchuk	w/o
WC	(Australia) Tammi Patterson	1	4
(Croatia) Petra Martić	6	6
WC	(Australia) Alison Bai	2	1
(Romania) Monica Niculescu	6	6
(South Africa) Chanelle Scheepers	6^{5}	4
8	(Czech Republic) Barbora Záhlavová-Strýcová	7	6

Second round
(Ukraine) Olga Savchuk	1	4
(Croatia) Petra Martić	6	6
(Romania) Monica Niculescu	3	5
8	(Czech Republic) Barbora Záhlavová-Strýcová	6	7

Qualifying competition
(Croatia) Petra Martić	4	3
8	(Czech Republic) Barbora Záhlavová-Strýcová	6	6

=== Second qualifier ===
First round
2	(Slovenia) Polona Hercog	5	1
(United States) Jill Craybas	7	6
(Czech Republic) Andrea Hlaváčková	6	6
WC	(Australia) Marija Mirkovic	0	1
(France) Virginie Razzano	6	7
Alt	(Germany) Anna-Lena Grönefeld	3	5
(Russia) Evgeniya Rodina	6^{4}	7	3
7	(Czech Republic) Iveta Benešová	7	6^{7}	6

Second round
(United States) Jill Craybas	1	6	3
(Czech Republic) Andrea Hlaváčková	6	3	6
(France) Virginie Razzano	6	3
7	(Czech Republic) Iveta Benešová	1	2r

Qualifying competition
(Czech Republic) Andrea Hlaváčková	3	4
(France) Virginie Razzano	6	6

=== Third qualifier ===
First round
3	(Argentina) Gisela Dulko	4	4
(Czech Republic) Lucie Hradecká	6	6
(France) Mathilde Johansson	3	0
(United States) Vania King	6	6
(France) Pauline Parmentier	1	2
(Belarus) Anastasiya Yakimova	6	6
WC	(Australia) Sophie Letcher	7	6^{4}	6
11	(United States) Varvara Lepchenko	6^{2}	7	3

Second round
(Czech Republic) Lucie Hradecká	0	6	6
(United States) Vania King	6	4	4
(Belarus) Anastasiya Yakimova	6	6
WC	(Australia) Sophie Letcher	0	0

Qualifying competition
(Czech Republic) Lucie Hradecká	6	6
(Belarus) Anastasiya Yakimova	4	4

=== Fourth qualifier ===
First round
4	(Russia) Ekaterina Makarova	6	6^{5}	6
(United States) Coco Vandeweghe	1	7	4
(Croatia) Karolina Šprem	6	3	6
(United States) Christina McHale	4	6	3
Alt	(Romania) Liana Ungur	5	3
(Switzerland) Stefanie Vögele	7	6
WC	(Australia) Viktorija Rajicic	3	1
10	(Spain) Anabel Medina Garrigues	6	6

Second round
4	(Russia) Ekaterina Makarova	7	6
(Croatia) Karolina Šprem	6^{3}	3
(Switzerland) Stefanie Vögele	6	6
10	(Spain) Anabel Medina Garrigues	3	4

Qualifying competition
4	(Russia) Ekaterina Makarova	6	6
(Switzerland) Stefanie Vögele	3	4

=== Fifth qualifier ===
First round
5	(Switzerland) Timea Bacsinszky	6^{4}	3
(Canada) Rebecca Marino	7	6
(Czech Republic) Sandra Záhlavová	6	7
(Italy) Maria Elena Camerin	1	5
WC	(Australia) Jade Hopper	1	4
(Czech Republic) Renata Voráčová	6	6
(Russia) Regina Kulikova	6	6^{6}	2
9	(Austria) Sybille Bammer	3	7	6

Second round
(Canada) Rebecca Marino	4	6	0
(Czech Republic) Sandra Záhlavová	6	4	6
(Czech Republic) Renata Voráčová	2	4
9	(Austria) Sybille Bammer	6	6

Qualifying competition
(Czech Republic) Sandra Záhlavová	6	6
9	(Austria) Sybille Bammer	4	4

=== Sixth qualifier ===
First round
6	(Russia) Vera Dushevina	6	6
(Czech Republic) Zuzana Ondrášková	1	2
(Germany) Kristina Barrois	2	3
(Romania) Sorana Cîrstea	6	6
(Croatia) Mirjana Lučić	4	2
(Netherlands) Arantxa Rus	6	6
(Spain) Lourdes Domínguez Lino	6	5	0
12	(Serbia) Bojana Jovanovski	1	7	6

Second round
6	(Russia) Vera Dushevina	5	3
(Romania) Sorana Cîrstea	7	6
(Netherlands) Arantxa Rus	2	7	5
12	(Serbia) Bojana Jovanovski	6	5	7

Qualifying competition
(Romania) Sorana Cîrstea	4	2
12	(Serbia) Bojana Jovanovski	6	6
