= 2011 Medibank International Sydney – Men's singles qualifying =

Men's singles qualifying
- 2011 Medibank International Sydney

Events
Singles	men	women
Doubles	men	women
← 2010 ·	Medibank International Sydney	· 2012 →

== Players ==
=== Seeds ===
1. (Germany) ~~Benjamin Becker~~ (moved to the main draw)
2. (Germany) Michael Berrer (second round)
3. (Kazakhstan) Mikhail Kukushkin (second round)
4. (Germany) ~~Tobias Kamke~~ (withdrew)
5. (Poland) Łukasz Kubot (qualifying round, lucky loser)
6. (Argentina) Eduardo Schwank (first round)
7. (Israel) Dudi Sela (first round)
8. (Russia) Igor Andreev (qualifier)

=== Qualifiers ===
1. (Australia) Chris Guccione
2. (Australia) Bernard Tomic
3. (Portugal) Frederico Gil
4. (Russia) Igor Andreev

=== Lucky losers ===
1. (Poland) Łukasz Kubot

== Qualifying draw ==
=== First qualifier ===
First round
(Colombia) Robert Farah	6^{5}	4
(United States) Donald Young	7	6
(Australia) Carsten Ball	6^{5}	7	6^{1}
(Poland) Michał Przysiężny	7	6^{5}	7
(Colombia) Alejandro Falla	4	6	6
(Portugal) Rui Machado	6	3	2
WC	(Australia) Chris Guccione	4	6	7
6	(Argentina) Eduardo Schwank	6	4	6^{4}

Second round
(United States) Donald Young	1	6	3
(Poland) Michał Przysiężny	6	2	6
(Colombia) Alejandro Falla	4	6	3
WC	(Australia) Chris Guccione	6	4	6

Qualifying competition
(Poland) Michał Przysiężny	2	6	6^{2}
WC	(Australia) Chris Guccione	6	3	7

=== Second qualifier ===
First round
2	(Germany) Michael Berrer	6	4	6
(Ukraine) Illya Marchenko	4	6	3
WC	(Australia) Bernard Tomic	6	6
(Russia) Igor Kunitsyn	4	0
WC	(Australia) Greg Jones	2	6	0
(Australia) Peter Luczak	6	4	6
(Slovenia) Grega Žemlja	3	4
5	(Poland) Łukasz Kubot	6	6

Second round
2	(Germany) Michael Berrer	6^{2}	4
WC	(Australia) Bernard Tomic	7	6
(Australia) Peter Luczak	2	5
5	(Poland) Łukasz Kubot	6	7

Qualifying competition
WC	(Australia) Bernard Tomic	6	6
5	(Poland) Łukasz Kubot	3	2

=== Third qualifier ===
First round
3	(Kazakhstan) Mikhail Kukushkin	6	7
ALT	(Czech Republic) Lukáš Rosol	1	5
(Germany) Simon Greul	6	6
(Germany) Daniel Brands	4	3
(Czech Republic) Jaroslav Pospíšil	6	4	5
(Australia) Marinko Matosevic	2	6	7
(Portugal) Frederico Gil	6	4	6
7	(Israel) Dudi Sela	4	6	1

Second round
3	(Kazakhstan) Mikhail Kukushkin	1	2
(Germany) Simon Greul	6	6
(Australia) Marinko Matosevic	6	3	3
(Portugal) Frederico Gil	3	6	6

Qualifying competition
(Germany) Simon Greul	6	3	2
(Portugal) Frederico Gil	3	6	6

=== Fourth qualifier ===
First round
ALT	(Slovakia) Andrej Martin	3	6	7
(Kazakhstan) Evgeny Korolev	6	0	6^{3}
WC	(Australia) John Millman	7	7
(Turkey) Marsel İlhan	6^{5}	5
(Lithuania) Ričardas Berankis	6	6
(Italy) Filippo Volandri	1	0
(Slovakia) Karol Beck	6^{3}	5
8	(Russia) Igor Andreev	7	7

Second round
ALT	(Slovakia) Andrej Martin	7	6^{2}	6
WC	(Australia) John Millman	6^{3}	7	2
(Lithuania) Ričardas Berankis	4	6^{6}
8	(Russia) Igor Andreev	6	7

Qualifying competition
ALT	(Slovakia) Andrej Martin	2	1
8	(Russia) Igor Andreev	6	6
