= Dominika Cibulková career statistics =

Career finals
Discipline	Type	Won	Lost	Total	WR (Note: Winning rate)
Singles	Grand Slam	0	1	1	0.00
Singles	Summer Olympics	–	–	–	–
Singles	WTA Finals (Note: Formerly known as: Virginia Slims Championships (until 1995); WTA Tour Championships (until 2014))	1	0	1	1.00
Singles	WTA Elite (Note: Elite tier: WTA Tournament of Champions (2009–14); WTA Elite Trophy (2015–present))	–	–	–	–
Singles	WTA 1000 (Note: Formerly known as: Category 4 & 5 & 6 (until 1990); Tier I (until 2009); WTA Premier Mandatory and 5 (until 2021))	0	3	3	0.00
Singles	WTA 500 (Note: Formerly known as: Category 3 (until 1990); Tier II (until 2009); WTA Premier (until 2021))	4	3	7	0.57
Singles	WTA 250 (Note: Formerly known as: Category 1 & 2 (until 1990); Tier III & IV & V (until 2009); WTA International (until 2021))	3	6	9	0.33
Singles	Total	8	13	21	0.38
Doubles	Grand Slam	–	–	–	–
Doubles	Summer Olympics	–	–	–	–
Doubles	WTA Finals	–	–	–	–
Doubles	WTA Elite	–	–	–	–
Doubles	WTA 1000	–	–	–	–
Doubles	WTA 500	–	–	–	–
Doubles	WTA 250	1	2	3	0.33
Doubles	Total	1	2	3	0.33
Total		9	15	24	0.38

This is a list of the main career statistics of the professional Slovak tennis player Dominika Cibulková.

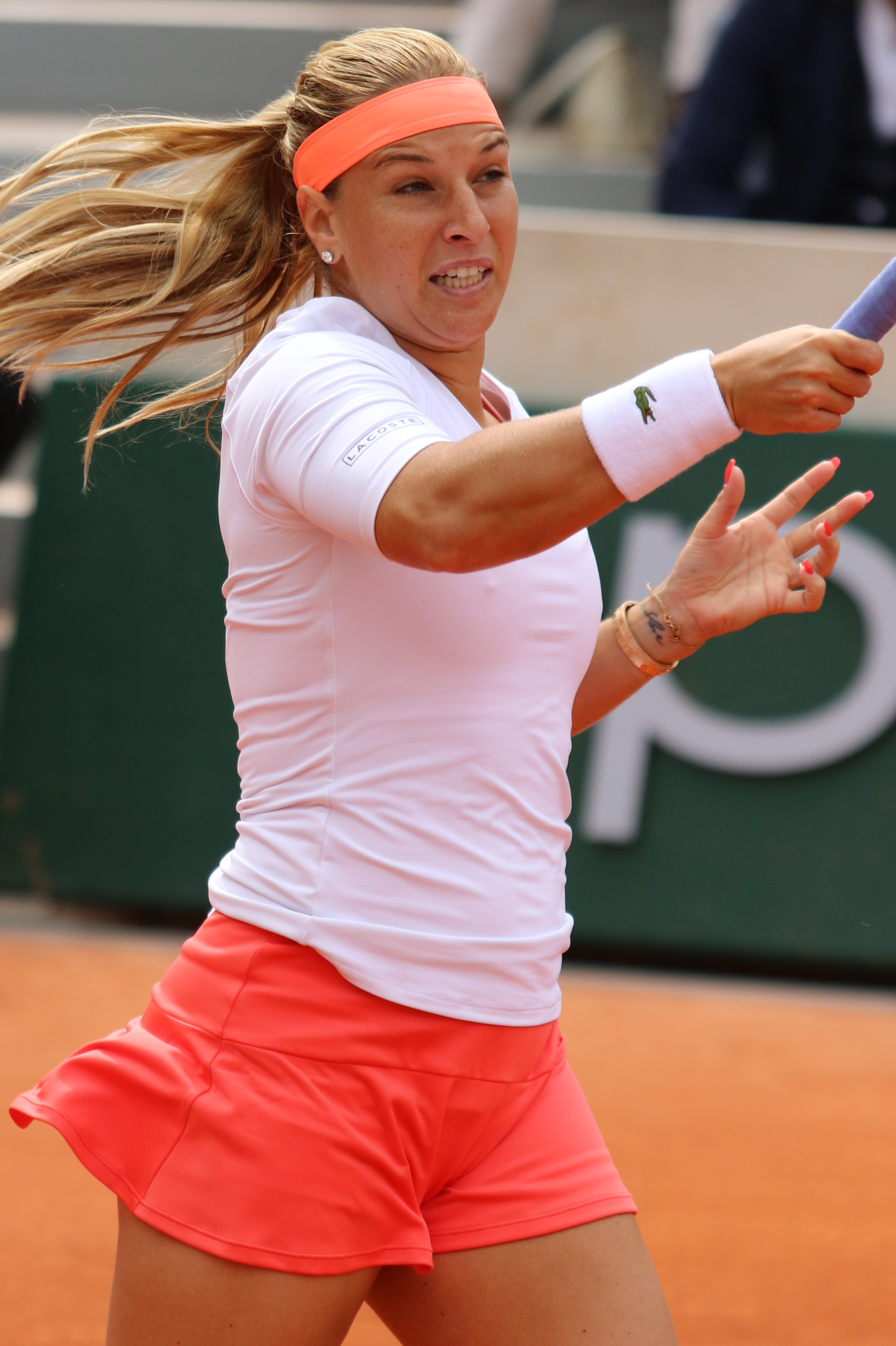
Cibulková at the 2019 French Open.

== Performance timelines ==
Key
W	F	SF	QF	#R	RR	Q#	P#	DNQ	A	Z#	PO	G	S	B	NMS	NTI	P	NH

(W) winner; (F) finalist; (SF) semifinalist; (QF) quarterfinalist; (#R) rounds 4, 3, 2, 1; (RR) round-robin stage; (Q#) qualification round; (P#) preliminary round; (DNQ) did not qualify; (A) absent; (Z#) Davis/Fed Cup Zonal Group (with number indication) or (PO) play-off; (G) gold, (S) silver or (B) bronze Olympic/Paralympic medal; (NMS) not a Masters tournament; (NTI) not a Tier I tournament; (P) postponed; (NH) not held; (SR) strike rate (events won / competed); (W–L) win–loss record.

Only main-draw results in WTA Tour, Grand Slam tournaments, Billie Jean King Cup (Fed Cup), Hopman Cup and Olympic Games are included in win–loss records.

=== Singles ===
Tournament	2005	2006	2007	2008	2009	2010	2011	2012	2013	2014	2015	2016	2017	2018	2019	SR	W–L	Win%
Grand Slam tournaments
Australian Open	A	A	Q1	1R	4R	1R	3R	2R	2R	F	QF	1R	3R	1R	1R	0 / 12	20–12	63%
French Open	A	A	3R	3R	SF	3R	1R	QF	2R	3R	A	3R	2R	1R	1R	0 / 12	21–12	64%
Wimbledon	A	A	Q1	1R	3R	3R	QF	1R	3R	3R	1R	QF	3R	QF	A	0 / 11	22–11	67%
US Open	A	A	2R	3R	A	QF	2R	3R	1R	1R	3R	3R	2R	4R	A	0 / 11	18–11	62%
Win–loss	0–0	0–0	3–2	4–4	10–3	8–4	7–4	7–4	4–4	10–4	6–3	8–4	6–4	7–4	0–2	0 / 46	81–46	64%
Year-end championships
WTA Finals	DNQ											W	DNQ			1 / 1	3–2	60%
WTA Elite Trophy	NH				DNQ					RR	DNQ	A	A	DNQ		0 / 1	2–1	67%
National representation
Summer Olympics	NH			3R	NH			1R	NH			A	NH			0 / 2	2–1	67%
Fed Cup	PO	PO	PO	PO	PO	PO	PO	PO	SF	QF	A	PO	A	A	PO	0 / 2	22–11	67%
WTA 1000 + former^{†} tournaments
Dubai / Qatar Open (Note: The first Premier 5 event of the year has switched back and forth between the Dubai Tennis Championships and the Qatar Ladies Open since 2009. Dubai was classified as a Premier 5 event from 2009 to 2011 before being succeeded by Doha for the 2012–2014 period. In 2015, Dubai regained its Premier 5 status while Doha was demoted to Premier status. The Premier 5 tournaments were reclassified as WTA 1000 tournaments in 2021.)	NMS			QF	3R	2R	1R	1R	A	1R	A	A	2R	2R	2R	0 / 9	8–9	47%
Indian Wells Open	A	A	A	3R	2R	2R	4R	3R	3R	QF	A	2R	4R	2R	2R	0 / 11	11–11	50%
Miami Open	A	A	1R	3R	3R	3R	3R	4R	4R	SF	A	2R	4R	A	1R	0 / 11	16–11	59%
German / Madrid Open (Note: In 2009, the German Open was replaced by the Madrid Open. The Premier Mandatory tournaments were reclassified as WTA 1000 tournaments in 2021.)	A	A	A	1R	A	2R	QF	1R	2R	1R	A	F	2R	1R	1R	0 / 10	10–10	50%
Italian Open	A	A	A	2R	A	3R	A	QF	3R	1R	A	A	2R	2R	2R	0 / 8	9–8	53%
Canadian Open	A	A	2R	F	2R	1R	1R	2R	QF	2R	2R	2R	2R	A	A	0 / 11	14–11	56%
Cincinnati Open	NMS				1R	1R	A	2R	1R	1R	1R	3R	3R	A	A	0 / 8	4–8	33%
Pan Pacific / Wuhan Open (Note: In 2014, the Toray Pan Pacific Open was downgraded to a Premier event and replaced by the Wuhan Open. The Premier 5 tournaments were reclassified as WTA 1000 tournaments in 2021.)	A	A	A	2R	A	1R	2R	3R	3R	1R	1R	F	3R	QF	A	0 / 10	15–10	60%
China Open	NMS				A	2R	3R	1R	1R	A	2R	2R	1R	QF	A	0 / 8	7–8	47%
Charleston Open^{†}	A	A	1R	1R	NMS											0 / 2	0–2	0%
Kremlin Cup^{†}	A	A	A	QF	NMS											0 / 1	2–1	67%
Win–loss	0–0	0–0	1–3	15–9	4–5	6–9	8–7	8–9	11–8	8–8	2–4	14–7	9–9	8–6	2–5	0 / 89	96–89	52%
Career statistics
	2005	2006	2007	2008	2009	2010	2011	2012	2013	2014	2015	2016	2017	2018	2019	SR	W–L	Win%
Tournaments	0 (Note: During the season, she did not play in the main-draw of any WTA Tour-level tournaments. However, she played at the Billie Jean King Cup that is not counted as a played tournament but matches counted.)	2	17	26	17	24	22	27	24	23	16	23	22	19	9	Career total: 271		
Titles	0	0	0	0	0	0	1	1	1	1	0	4	0	0	0	Career total: 8		
Finals	0	0	0	2	0	0	2	2	2	3	0	7	1	2	0	Career total: 21		
Hard win–loss	0–1	2–1	11–13	27–18	9–10	20–18	29–15	20–18	19–16	29–19	17–14	37–17	22–15	18–11	1–5	7 / 190	271–191	59%
Clay win–loss	0–0	2–1	7–6	10–6	12–6	8–4	10–4	14–6	5–6	2–3	0–0	9–3	2–3	5–5	3–4	0 / 53	89–57	61%
Grass win–loss	0–0	0–0	0–0	0–1	2–2	4–2	7–2	2–3	4–2	2–2	2–2	9–1	2–4	5–3	0–0	1 / 25	39–24	62%
Carpet win–loss	0–0	0–0	0–0	2–2	0–0	0–0	2–1	0–0	0–1	0–0	0–0	0–0	0–0	0–0	0–0	0 / 3	4–4	50%
Overall win–loss	0–1	4–2	18–19	39–27	23–18	32–24	48–22	36–27	28–25	33–24	19–16	55–21	26–22	28–19	4–9	8 / 271	403–276	59%
Win (%)	0%	67%	49%	59%	56%	57%	69%	57%	53%	58%	54%	72%	54%	60%	31%	Career total: 59%		
Year-end ranking	555	156	52	19	30	31	18	15	23	11	38	5	26	25	316	$13,725,520		

=== Doubles ===
Tournament	2005	2006	2007	2008	2009	2010	2011	2012	2013	2014	2015	2016	2017	2018	2019	SR	W–L	Win%
Grand Slam tournaments
Australian Open	A	A	A	A	1R	1R	1R	2R	2R	1R	2R	3R	A	A	A	0 / 8	5–8	38%
French Open	A	A	A	1R	1R	2R	A	2R	1R	2R (Note: Withdraw during the tournament. Not counted as a loss.)	A	2R	A	A	1R	0 / 8	4–7	36%
Wimbledon	A	A	A	1R	1R	3R	1R	2R	1R	1R	A	A	A	A	A	0 / 7	3–7	30%
US Open	A	A	1R	QF	A	2R	2R	1R	1R	1R	2R	A	A	A	A	0 / 8	6–6	50%
Win–loss	0–0	0–0	0–1	3–3	0–3	4–3	1–2	3–4	1–4	1–3	2–2	3–2	0–0	0–0	0–1	0 / 31	18–28	39%
National representation
Summer Olympics	NH			A	NH			1R	NH			A	NH			0 / 1	0–1	0%
WTA 1000 + former^{†} tournaments
Dubai / Qatar Open	A	A	A	A	2R	A	A	A	A	A	A	A	A	1R	A	0 / 1	1–1	50%
Indian Wells Open	A	A	A	A	A	A	A	A	1R	A	A	A	A	A	A	0 / 1	0–1	0%
Miami Open	A	A	A	A	A	A	A	1R	A	A	A	A	A	A	A	0 / 1	0–1	0%
German / Madrid Open	A	A	A	A	A	A	A	QF	1R	A	A	A	A	A	A	0 / 2	2–2	50%
Italian Open	A	A	A	A	A	A	A	QF	QF	A	A	A	A	A	A	0 / 1	4–1	80%
Canadian Open	A	A	A	A	A	A	A	2R	1R	A	2R	A	1R	A	A	0 / 4	2–4	33%
Cincinnati Open	A	A	A	A	A	2R	A	2R	A	A	A	A	A	A	A	0 / 1	2–1	67%
Pan Pacific / Wuhan Open	A	A	A	A	A	A	A	A	1R	A	A	A	A	A	A	0 / 1	0–1	0%
China Open	A	A	A	A	A	A	A	1R	A	A	A	A	A	A	A	0 / 1	0–1	0%
Charleston Open^{†}	A	A	A	1R	A	A	A	A	A	A	A	A	A	A	A	0 / 1	0–1	0%
Kremlin Cup^{†}	A	A	A	1R	A	A	A	A	A	A	A	A	A	A	A	0 / 1	0–1	0%
Win–loss	0–0	0–0	0–0	0–2	1–0	1–1	0–0	6–4	2–5	0–0	1–1	0–0	0–1	0–1	0–0	0 / 15	11–15	42%
Career statistics
Tournaments	0	0	1	9	5	7	5	16	14	6	6	3	3	2	1	Career total: 78		
Titles	0	0	0	0	0	0	0	0	0	0	0	0	1	0	0	Career total: 1		
Finals	0	0	0	0	0	0	1	0	1	0	0	0	1	0	0	Career total: 3		
Overall win–loss	0–1	1–2	0–2	4–8	1–5	7–7	5–4	13–14	6–15	2–5	4–5	3–3	5–2	0–2	0–1	1 / 78	51–76	40%
Year-end ranking	n/a	598	457	141	847	108	157	62	125	346	171	181	196	n/a	1207			

== Grand Slam tournament finals ==
=== Singles: 1 (runner-up) ===
Result	Year	Championship	Surface	Opponent	Score
Loss	2014	Australian Open	Hard	(China) Li Na	6–7^{(3–7)}, 0–6

== Other significant finals ==
=== WTA Finals ===
==== Singles: 1 (title) ====
Result	Year	Championship	Surface	Opponent	Score
Win	2016	WTA Finals, Singapore	Hard (i)	(Germany) Angelique Kerber	6–3, 6–4

=== WTA 1000 ===
==== Singles: 3 (3 runner-ups) ====
Result	Year	Tournament	Surface	Opponent	Score
Loss	2008	Canadian Open	Hard	(Russia) Dinara Safina	2–6, 1–6
Loss	2016	Madrid Open	Clay	(Romania) Simona Halep	2–6, 4–6
Loss	2016	Wuhan Open	Hard	(Czech Republic) Petra Kvitová	1–6, 1–6

== WTA Tour finals ==
=== Singles: 21 (8 titles, 13 runner-ups) ===
Legend Grand Slam tournaments (0–1) WTA Finals (1–0) WTA 1000 (Tier I / Premier 5 / Premier M) (0–3) WTA 500 (Tier II / Premier) (4–3) WTA 250 (International) (3–6)	Finals by surface Hard (7–9) Clay (0–4) Grass (1–0) Carpet (0–0)

Result	W–L	Date	Tournament	Tier	Surface	Opponent	Score
Loss	0–1	Apr 2008	Amelia Island Championships, United States	Tier II	Clay	(Russia) Maria Sharapova	6–7^{(7–9)}, 3–6
Loss	0–2	Aug 2008	Canadian Open, Canada	Tier I	Hard	(Russia) Dinara Safina	2–6, 1–6
Loss	0–3	Oct 2011	Linz Open, Austria	International	Hard (i)	(Czech Republic) Petra Kvitová	4–6, 1–6
Win	1–3	Oct 2011	Kremlin Cup, Russia	Premier	Hard (i)	(Estonia) Kaia Kanepi	3–6, 7–6^{(7–1)}, 7–5
Loss	1–4	Apr 2012	Barcelona Ladies Open, Spain	International	Clay	(Italy) Sara Errani	2–6, 2–6
Win	2–4	Jul 2012	Southern California Open, United States	Premier	Hard	(France) Marion Bartoli	6–1, 7–5
Loss	2–5	Jan 2013	Sydney International, Australia	Premier	Hard	(Poland) Agnieszka Radwańska	0–6, 0–6
Win	3–5	Jul 2013	Bank of the West Classic, United States	Premier	Hard	(Poland) Agnieszka Radwańska	3–6, 6–4, 6–4
Loss	3–6	Jan 2014	Australian Open, Australia	Grand Slam	Hard	(China) Li Na	6–7^{(3–7)}, 0–6
Win	4–6	Mar 2014	Mexican Open, Mexico	International	Hard	(United States) Christina McHale	7–6^{(7–3)}, 4–6, 6–4
Loss	4–7	Apr 2014	Malaysian Open, Malaysia	International	Hard	(Croatia) Donna Vekić	7–5, 5–7, 6–7^{(4–7)}
Loss	4–8	Feb 2016	Mexican Open, Mexico	International	Hard	(United States) Sloane Stephens	4–6, 6–4, 6–7^{(5–7)}
Win	5–8	Apr 2016	Katowice Open, Poland	International	Hard (i)	(Italy) Camila Giorgi	6–4, 6–0
Loss	5–9	May 2016	Madrid Open, Spain	Premier M	Clay	(Romania) Simona Halep	2–6, 4–6
Win	6–9	Jun 2016	Eastbourne International, United Kingdom	Premier	Grass	(Czech Republic) Karolína Plíšková	7–5, 6–3
Loss	6–10	Oct 2016	Wuhan Open, China	Premier 5	Hard	(Czech Republic) Petra Kvitová	1–6, 1–6
Win	7–10	Oct 2016	Linz Open, Austria	International	Hard (i)	(Switzerland) Viktorija Golubic	6–3, 7–5
Win	8–10	Oct 2016	WTA Finals, Singapore	Finals	Hard (i)	(Germany) Angelique Kerber	6–3, 6–4
Loss	8–11	Aug 2017	Connecticut Open, United States	Premier	Hard	(Australia) Daria Gavrilova	6–4, 3–6, 4–6
Loss	8–12	Feb 2018	Hungarian Ladies Open, Hungary	International	Hard (i)	(Belgium) Alison Van Uytvanck	3–6, 6–3, 5–7
Loss	8–13	May 2018	Internationaux de Strasbourg, France	International	Clay	(Russia) Anastasia Pavlyuchenkova	7–6^{(7–5)}, 6–7^{(3–7)}, 6–7^{(6–8)}

=== Doubles: 3 (1 title, 2 runner-ups) ===
Legend WTA 250 (International) (1–2)	Finals by surface Grass (1–2)

Result	W–L	Date	Tournament	Tier	Surface	Partner	Opponents	Score
Loss	0–1	Jun 2011	Rosmalen Championships, Netherlands	International	Grass	(Italy) Flavia Pennetta	(Czech Republic) Barbora Záhlavová-Strýcová (Czech Republic) Klára Zakopalová	6–1, 4–6, [7–10]
Loss	0–2	Jun 2013	Rosmalen Championships, Netherlands	International	Grass	(Spain) Arantxa Parra Santonja	(Romania) Irina-Camelia Begu (Spain) Anabel Medina Garrigues	6–4, 6–7^{(3–7)}, [9–11]
Win	1–2	Jun 2017	Rosmalen Championships, Netherlands	International	Grass	(Belgium) Kirsten Flipkens	(Netherlands) Kiki Bertens (Netherlands) Demi Schuurs	4–6, 6–4, [10–6]

== ITF Circuit finals ==
=== Singles: 6 (2 titles, 4 runner-ups) ===
Legend
$75,000 tournaments (1–0)
$50,000 tournaments (0–2)
$25,000 tournaments (0–1)
$10,000 tournaments (1–1)

Result	W–L	Date	Tournament	Tier	Surface	Opponent	Score
Loss	0–1	Apr 2005	ITF Rabat, Morocco	10,000	Clay	(Slovenia) Andreja Klepač	1–6, 6–3, 4–6
Win	1–1	Aug 2005	ITF Amarante, Portugal	10,000	Hard	(Spain) Paula Fondevila Castro	6–0, 6–2
Loss	1–2	Feb 2006	ITF Saint-Georges, Canada	25,000	Hard (i)	(Italy) Alberta Brianti	4–6, 2–6
Loss	1–3	May 2006	Boyd Tinsley Clay Court Classic, United States	50,000	Clay	(United States) Laura Granville	walkover
Loss	1–4	Aug 2006	ITF Rimini, Italy	50,000	Clay	(Croatia) Sanja Ančić	6–7^{(6–8)}, 6–3, 3–6
Win	2–4	Oct 2006	Slovak Open, Slovakia	75,000	Hard (i)	(Germany) Kristina Barrois	7–5, 6–1

=== Doubles: 1 (runner–up) ===
Legend
$25,000 tournaments (0–1)

Result	W–L	Date	Tournament	Tier	Surface	Partner	Opponents	Score
Loss	0–1	Feb 2006	ITF Saint-Georges, Canada	25,000	Hard (i)	(Czech Republic) Veronika Chvojková	(Italy) Alberta Brianti (Italy) Giulia Casoni	2–6, 6–3, 1–6

== WTA Tour career earnings ==
Cibulková earned more than 13 million dollars during her career.

Year	Grand Slam titles (Note: Includes singles, doubles and mixed doubles titles.)	WTA titles	Total titles	Earnings ($)	Money list rank
2007	0	0	0	151,999	99
2008	0	0	0	562,624	28
2009	0	0	0	629,599	31
2010	0	0	0	565,859	36
2011	0	1	1	771,902	25
2012	0	1	1	801,587	21
2013	0	1	1	747,299	32
2014	0	1	1	1,998,734	14
2015	0	0	0	671,511	48
2016	0	4	4	3,940,433	6
2017	0	1	1	1,409,663	27
2018	0	0	0	1,175,376	34
2019	0	0	0	265,557	136
Career	0	9	9	13,725,520	37

== Career Grand Slam statistics ==
=== Seedings ===
The tournaments won by Cibulková are in boldface, and advanced into finals by Cibulková are in italics.

==== Singles ====
Legend (slams won / times seeded) seeded No. 4–10 (0 / 5) seeded No. 11–32 (0 / 30) unseeded (0 / 11)	Longest streak 3 13 3

Year	Australian Open	French Open	Wimbledon	US Open
2007	did not qualify	unseeded	did not qualify	unseeded
2008	unseeded	28th	30th	18th
2009	18th	20th	14th	absent
2010	23rd	26th	unseeded	unseeded
2011	29th	22nd	24th	14th
2012	17th	15th	13th	13th
2013	15th	16th	18th	17th
2014	20th	9th	10th	12th
2015	11th	absent	unseeded	unseeded
2016	unseeded	22nd	19th	12th
2017	6th	6th	8th	11th
2018	24th	unseeded	unseeded	29th
2019	26th	unseeded	absent	absent

=== Best Grand Slam results details ===
Australian Open
2014 Australian Open (20th seed)
Round	Opponent	Score
1R	(Italy) Francesca Schiavone	6–3, 6–4
2R	(Switzerland) Stefanie Vögele	6–0, 6–1
3R	(Spain) Carla Suárez Navarro (16)	6–1, 6–0
4R	(Russia) Maria Sharapova (3)	3–6, 6–4, 6–1
QF	(Romania) Simona Halep (11)	6–3, 6–0
SF	(Poland) Agnieszka Radwańska (5)	6–1, 6–2
F	(China) Li Na (4)	6–7^{(3–7)}, 0–6

Wimbledon Championships
2011 Wimbledon (24th seed)
Round	Opponent	Score
1R	(Croatia) Mirjana Lučić	3–6, 6–3, 8–6
2R	(Slovenia) Polona Hercog	6–1, 6–2
3R	(Germany) Julia Görges (16)	6–4, 1–6, 6–3
4R	(Denmark) Caroline Wozniacki (1)	1–6, 7–6^{(7–5)}, 7–5
QF	(Russia) Maria Sharapova (5)	1–6, 1–6
2016 Wimbledon (19th seed)
Round	Opponent	Score
1R	(Croatia) Mirjana Lučić-Baroni	7–5, 6–3
2R	(Australia) Daria Gavrilova	6–3, 6–2
3R	(Canada) Eugenie Bouchard	6–4, 6–3
4R	(Poland) Agnieszka Radwańska (3)	6–3, 5–7, 9–7
QF	(Russia) Elena Vesnina	2–6, 2–6
2018 Wimbledon (not seeded)
Round	Opponent	Score
1R	(France) Alizé Cornet	7–6^{(7–3)}, 6–1
2R	(United Kingdom) Johanna Konta (22)	6–3, 6–4
3R	(Belgium) Elise Mertens (15)	6–2, 6–2
4R	(Chinese Taipei) Hsieh Su-wei	6–4, 6–1
QF	(Latvia) Jeļena Ostapenko (12)	5–7, 4–6

French Open
2009 French Open (20th seed)
Round	Opponent	Score
1R	(Ukraine) Alona Bondarenko	6–4, 2–6, 6–4
2R	(Belgium) Kirsten Flipkens	6–1, 6–0
3R	(Argentina) Gisela Dulko	6–4, 6–2
4R	(Hungary) Ágnes Szávay (29)	6–2, 6–4
QF	(Russia) Maria Sharapova	6–0, 6–2
SF	(Russia) Dinara Safina (1)	3–6, 3–6

US Open
2010 US Open (not seeded)
Round	Opponent	Score
1R	(Switzerland) Stefanie Vögele	6–2, 4–6, 7–5
2R	(Ukraine) Kateryna Bondarenko	6–2, 5–7, 7–6^{(9–7)}
3R	(Spain) Lourdes Domínguez Lino	6–0, 6–1
4R	(Russia) Svetlana Kuznetsova (11)	7–5, 7–6^{(7–4)}
QF	(Denmark) Caroline Wozniacki (1)	2–6, 5–7

== Billie Jean King Cup ==
=== Finals ===
Result	Date	Tournament	Surface	Partner/team	Opponents	Score
Win	Jan 2009	Hopman Cup, Australia	Hard (i)	(Slovakia) Dominik Hrbatý	(Russia) Dinara Safina (Russia) Marat Safin	2–0

=== Participations ===
This table shows Cibulková's participation for Slovakia Fed Cup team.

Source: fedcup.com

Legend
WG SF
WG QF
PO / WG2 / PO2 / Z1 RR

==== Singles (20–11) ====
Edition	Round	Date	Venue	Against	Surface	Opponent	W/L	Result
2005	PO2	Jul 2005	Pathum Thani, Thailand	Thailand	Hard	Suchanun Viratprasert	L	4–6, 4–6
2006	Z1 RR	Apr 2006	Plovdiv, Bulgaria	Finland	Clay	Katariina Tuohimaa	W	6–2, 6–1
2006	PO2	Jul 2006	Bratislava, Slovakia	Thailand	Hard (i)	Montinee Tangphong	W	6–3, 6–1
2007	WG2	Apr 2007	Bratislava, Slovakia	Czech Republic	Clay	Nicole Vaidišová	L	6–3, 4–6, 5–7
2007	PO2	Jul 2007	Košice, Slovakia	Serbia	Hard (i)	Jelena Janković	L	5–7, 6–1, 7–9
2007	PO2	Jul 2007	Košice, Slovakia	Serbia	Hard (i)	Ana Jovanović	W	6–4, 6–2
2008	WG2	Feb 2008	Brno, Czech Republic	Czech Republic	Carpet (i)	Petra Cetkovská	W	7–5, 6–3
2008	WG2	Feb 2008	Brno, Czech Republic	Czech Republic	Carpet (i)	Nicole Vaidišová	L	6–3, 3–6, 1–6
2008	PO2	Apr 2008	Bratislava, Slovakia	Uzbekistan	Clay (i)	Iroda Tulyaganova	W	7–6^{(7–4)}, 7–5
2008	PO2	Apr 2008	Bratislava, Slovakia	Uzbekistan	Clay (i)	Akgul Amanmuradova	W	7–6^{(11–9)}, 6–4
2009	WG2	Feb 2009	Bratislava, Slovakia	Belgium	Hard (i)	Kirsten Flipkens	W	7–6^{(7–4)}, 6–1
2009	WG2	Feb 2009	Bratislava, Slovakia	Belgium	Hard (i)	Yanina Wickmayer	W	6–0, 6–3
2009	PO	Apr 2009	Limoges, France	France	Clay (i)	Amélie Mauresmo	L	6–4, 2–6, 3–6
2009	PO	Apr 2009	Limoges, France	France	Clay (i)	Alizé Cornet	W	6–2, 5–7, 6–4
2010	WG2	Feb 2010	Bratislava, Slovakia	China	Hard (i)	Han Xinyun	W	6–1, 6–4
2010	WG2	Feb 2010	Bratislava, Slovakia	China	Hard (i)	Zhang Shuai	W	6–4, 6–1
2011	WG QF	Feb 2011	Bratislava, Slovakia	Czech Republic	Hard (i)	Petra Kvitová	L	2–6, 3–6
2011	PO	Apr 2011	Bratislava, Slovakia	Serbia	Clay (i)	Bojana Jovanovski	W	4–6, 6–3, 6–1
2011	PO	Apr 2011	Bratislava, Slovakia	Serbia	Clay (i)	Ana Ivanovic	W	6–4, 3–3 ret.
2012	WG2	Feb 2012	Bratislava, Slovakia	France	Hard (i)	Virginie Razzano	L	4–6, 4–6
2012	WG2	Feb 2012	Bratislava, Slovakia	France	Hard (i)	Pauline Parmentier	W	6–4, 6–3
2012	PO	Apr 2012	Marbella, Spain	Spain	Clay	Lourdes Domínguez Lino	W	6–3, 6–0
2012	PO	Apr 2012	Marbella, Spain	Spain	Clay	Sílvia Soler Espinosa	W	6–4, 6–4
2013	WG QF	Feb 2013	Niš, Serbia	Serbia	Hard (i)	Vesna Dolonc	L	6–4, 5–4 ret.
2013	WG SF	Apr 2013	Moscow, Russia	Russia	Clay (i)	Anastasia Pavlyuchenkova	W	5–7, 6–1, 6–4
2013	WG SF	Apr 2013	Moscow, Russia	Russia	Clay (i)	Maria Kirilenko	L	5–7, 1–6
2014	WG QF	Feb 2014	Bratislava, Slovakia	Germany	Hard (i)	Andrea Petkovic	L	6–2, 6–7^{(7–9)}, 2–6
2014	WG QF	Feb 2014	Bratislava, Slovakia	Germany	Hard (i)	Angelique Kerber	L	3–6, 6–7^{(5–7)}
2016	WG2	Feb 2016	Bratislava, Slovakia	Australia	Hard (i)	Kimberly Birrell	W	6–3, 6–1
2016	PO2	Apr 2016	Bratislava, Slovakia	Canada	Clay (i)	Françoise Abanda	W	4–6, 6–3, 6–1
2016	PO2	Apr 2016	Bratislava, Slovakia	Canada	Clay (i)	Aleksandra Wozniak	W	6–2, 6–0

==== Doubles (1–8) ====
Edition	Round	Date	Against	Venue	Surface	Partner	Opponents	W/L	Result
2005	PO2	Jul 2005	Thailand	Pathum Thani, Thailand	Hard	Magdaléna Rybáriková	Montinee Tangphong; Napaporn Tongsalee	L	6–3, 1–6, 5–7
2006	Z1 RR	Apr 2006	Netherlands	Plovdiv, Bulgaria	Clay	Janette Husárová	Marrit Boonstra; Brenda Schultz-McCarthy	L	6–1, 0–6, 4–6
2006	Z1 RR	Apr 2006	Finland	Plovdiv, Bulgaria	Clay	Magdaléna Rybáriková	Piia Suomalainen; Katariina Tuohimaa	W	6–3, 6–2
2006	Z1 RR	Apr 2006	Great Britain	Plovdiv, Bulgaria	Clay	Janette Husárová	Elena Baltacha; Claire Curran	L	4–6, 3–6
2007	WG2	Apr 2007	Czech Republic	Bratislava, Slovakia	Clay	Janette Husárová	Iveta Melzer; Barbora Záhlavová-Strýcová	L	3–6, 3–6
2008	WG2	Feb 2008	Czech Republic	Brno, Czech Republic	Carpet (i)	Janette Husárová	Nicole Vaidišová; Květa Peschke	L	1–6, 6–2, 4–6
2009	PO	Apr 2009	France	Limoges, France	Clay (i)	Daniela Hantuchová	Nathalie Dechy; Amélie Mauresmo	L	6–4, 1–6, 4–6
2010	WG2	Feb 2010	China	Bratislava, Slovakia	Hard (i)	Kristína Kučová	Lu Jingjing; Zhang Shuai	L	3–2 ret.
2013	WG SF	Apr 2013	Russia	Moscow, Russia	Clay (i)	Daniela Hantuchová	Ekaterina Makarova; Elena Vesnina	L	6–4, 3–6, 1–6

== Record against other players ==
=== No. 1 wins ===
No.	Player	Event	Surface	Round	Score	Result
1.	(Denmark) Caroline Wozniacki	2011 Sydney International, Australia	Hard	2R	6–3, 6–3	QF
2.	(Denmark) Caroline Wozniacki	2011 Wimbledon Championships, United Kingdom	Grass	4R	1–6, 7–6^{(7–5)}, 7–5	QF
3.	(Belarus) Victoria Azarenka	2012 French Open, France	Clay	4R	6–2, 7–6^{(7–4)}	QF
4.	(Germany) Angelique Kerber	2016 WTA Finals, Singapore	Hard (i)	F	6–3, 6–4	W
5.	(Romania) Simona Halep	2018 Wuhan Open, China	Hard	2R	6–0, 7–5	3R

=== Top 10 wins ===
Season	2008	2009	2010	2011	2012	2013	2014	2015	2016	2017	2018	Total
Wins	5	0	1	6	2	5	4	3	8	0	3	37

#	Player	vsRank	Event	Surface	Round	Score	Rank
2008
1.	(United States) Venus Williams	8	Qatar Open, Qatar	Hard	3R	6–3, 6–3	45
2.	(Russia) Anna Chakvetadze	7	Amelia Island Championships, United States	Clay	3R	6–2, 3–6, 6–1	34
3.	(Russia) Elena Dementieva	6	Canadian Open, Canada	Hard	2R	6–4, 6–2	31
4.	(Serbia) Jelena Janković	2	Canadian Open, Canada	Hard	QF	7–5, 6–2	31
5.	(Serbia) Ana Ivanovic	5	Kremlin Cup, Russia	Hard (i)	2R	3–6, 6–2, 7–6^{(7–3)}	20
2010
6.	(Russia) Svetlana Kuznetsova	3	Sydney International, Australia	Hard	2R	7–5, 6–2	24
2011
7.	(Denmark) Caroline Wozniacki	1	Sydney International, Australia	Hard	2R	6–3, 6–3	31
8.	(Russia) Vera Zvonareva	3	Indian Wells Open, United States	Hard	3R	4–6, 7–6^{(7–4)}, 6–4	27
9.	(Russia) Maria Sharapova	6	Madrid Open, Spain	Hard	3R	7–5, 6–4	28
10.	(Denmark) Caroline Wozniacki	1	Wimbledon, United Kingdom	Grass	4R	1–6, 7–6^{(7–5)}, 7–5	24
11.	(Italy) Francesca Schiavone	9	China Open, China	Hard	2R	6–2, 6–2	22
12.	(Russia) Vera Zvonareva	5	Kremlin Cup, Russia	Hard (i)	QF	4–6, 6–4, 6–4	20
2012
13.	(Belarus) Victoria Azarenka	1	French Open, France	Clay	4R	6–2, 7–6^{(7–4)}	16
14.	(France) Marion Bartoli	10	San Diego Open, United States	Hard	F	6–1, 7–5	14
2013
15.	(Czech Republic) Petra Kvitová	8	Sydney International, Australia	Hard	1R	6–1, 6–1	15
16.	(Italy) Sara Errani	7	Sydney International, Australia	Hard	QF	6–2, 6–1	15
17.	(Germany) Angelique Kerber	5	Sydney International, Australia	Hard	SF	6–2, 4–6, 6–3	15
18.	(Poland) Agnieszka Radwańska	4	Bank of the West Classic, United States	Hard	F	3–6, 6–4, 6–4	25
19.	(Germany) Angelique Kerber	9	Canadian Open, Canada	Hard	2R	6–7^{(0–7)}, 6–2, 7–5	20
2014
20.	(Russia) Maria Sharapova	3	Australian Open, Australia	Hard	4R	3–6, 6–4, 6–1	24
21.	(Poland) Agnieszka Radwańska	5	Australian Open, Australia	Hard	SF	6–1, 6–2	24
22.	(Czech Republic) Petra Kvitová	9	Indian Wells Open, United States	Hard	4R	6–3, 6–2	11
23.	(Poland) Agnieszka Radwańska	3	Miami Open, United States	Hard	QF	3–6, 7–6^{(7–5)}, 6–3	11
2015
24.	(Czech Republic) Lucie Šafářová	6	Eastbourne International, United Kingdom	Grass	2R	7–6^{(9–7)}, 6–4	49
25.	(Serbia) Ana Ivanovic	7	US Open, United States	Hard	1R	6–3, 3–6, 6–3	50
26.	(Spain) Carla Suárez Navarro	10	Pan Pacific Open, Japan	Hard	2R	6–4, 6–4	48
2016
27.	(Poland) Agnieszka Radwańska	2	Madrid Open, Spain	Clay	1R	6–4, 6–7^{(3–7)}, 6–3	38
28.	(Poland) Agnieszka Radwańska	3	Eastbourne International, United Kingdom	Grass	QF	4–6, 7–6^{(7–2)}, 6–3	21
29.	(Poland) Agnieszka Radwańska	3	Wimbledon, United Kingdom	Grass	4R	6–3, 5–7, 9–7	18
30.	(Czech Republic) Karolína Plíšková	6	Wuhan Open, China	Hard	3R	6–2, 6–2	12
31.	(Russia) Svetlana Kuznetsova	10	Wuhan Open, China	Hard	SF	3–6, 6–3, 6–4	12
32.	(Romania) Simona Halep	4	WTA Finals, Singapore	Hard (i)	RR	6–3, 7–6^{(7–5)}	8
33.	(Russia) Svetlana Kuznetsova	9	WTA Finals, Singapore	Hard (i)	SF	1–6, 7–6^{(7–2)}, 6–4	8
34.	(Germany) Angelique Kerber	1	WTA Finals, Singapore	Hard (i)	F	6–3, 6–4	8
2018
35.	(Germany) Angelique Kerber	4	US Open, United States	Hard	3R	3–6, 6–3, 6–3	35
36.	(Romania) Simona Halep	1	Wuhan Open, China	Hard	2R	6–0, 7–5	31
37.	(United States) Sloane Stephens	9	China Open, China	Hard	3R	4–6, 6–2, 6–3	30

== Longest winning streaks ==
=== 9–match singles winning streak (2016) ===
#	Tournament	Tier	Start date	Surface	Rd	Opponent	vsRank	Score	Rank
–	French Open, France	Grand Slam	23 May 2016	Clay	3R	(Spain) Carla Suárez Navarro (12)	14	4–6, 6–3, 1–6	25
–	Eastbourne International, United Kingdom	WTA Premier	20 June 2016	Grass	1R	bye			21
1	Eastbourne International, United Kingdom	WTA Premier	20 June 2016	Grass	2R	(Latvia) Jeļena Ostapenko	36	6–3, 6–3	21
2	Eastbourne International, United Kingdom	WTA Premier	20 June 2016	Grass	3R	(Ukraine) Kateryna Bondarenko (Q)	65	7–6^{(7–3)}, 6–3	21
3	Eastbourne International, United Kingdom	WTA Premier	20 June 2016	Grass	QF	(Poland) Agnieszka Radwańska (1)	3	4–6, 7–6^{(7–2)}, 6–3	21
4	Eastbourne International, United Kingdom	WTA Premier	20 June 2016	Grass	SF	(Puerto Rico) Monica Puig (Q)	43	6–2, 6–1	21
5	Eastbourne International, United Kingdom	WTA Premier	20 June 2016	Grass	F	(Czech Republic) Karolína Plíšková (10)	17	7–5, 6–3	21
6	Wimbledon, United Kingdom	Grand Slam	27 June 2016	Grass	1R	(Croatia) Mirjana Lučić-Baroni	53	7–5, 6–3	18
7	Wimbledon, United Kingdom	Grand Slam	27 June 2016	Grass	2R	(Australia) Daria Gavrilova	56	6–3, 6–2	18
8	Wimbledon, United Kingdom	Grand Slam	27 June 2016	Grass	3R	(Canada) Eugenie Bouchard	48	6–4, 6–3	18
9	Wimbledon, United Kingdom	Grand Slam	27 June 2016	Grass	4R	(Poland) Agnieszka Radwańska (3)	3	6–3, 5–7, 9–7	18
–	Wimbledon, United Kingdom	Grand Slam	27 June 2016	Grass	QF	(Russia) Elena Vesnina	50	2–6, 2–6	18
