= 2012 Mercury Insurance Open =

- Date: July 16–22
- Edition: 32nd
- Category: WTA Premier
- Draw: 28S / 16D
- Prize money: $740,000
- Surface: Hard / outdoor
- Location: Carlsbad, California, United States

Champions

Singles
- (Slovakia) Dominika Cibulková

Doubles
- (United States) Raquel Kops-Jones / (United States) Abigail Spears
- Southern California Open

The 2012 Mercury Insurance Open was a women's tennis tournament played on outdoor hard courts. It was the 3rd edition of the Southern California Open since the tournament left the tour in 2007. It was classified as one of the WTA Premier tournaments of the 2012 WTA Tour. It took place in Carlsbad, California, United States from July 16 through July 22, 2012. Second-seeded Dominika Cibulková won the singles title.

== Finals ==
=== Singles ===
(Slovakia) Dominika Cibulková defeated (France) Marion Bartoli, 6–1, 7–5

- It was Cibulková's only singles title of the year and the 2nd of her career.

=== Doubles ===
(United States) Raquel Kops-Jones / (United States) Abigail Spears defeated (United States) Vania King / (Russia) Nadia Petrova, 6–2, 6–4

== Singles main-draw entrants ==
=== Seeds ===
Country	Player	Rank^{1}	Seed
FRA	Marion Bartoli	10	1
SVK	Dominika Cibulková	15	2
SRB	Jelena Janković	20	3
RUS	Nadia Petrova	21	4
USA	Christina McHale	28	5
SVK	Daniela Hantuchová	33	6
BEL	Yanina Wickmayer	37	7
RSA	Chanelle Scheepers	42	8

- ^{1} Rankings are as of July 9, 2012

=== Other entrants ===
The following players received wildcards into the singles main draw:

- (United States) Lauren Davis
- (United States) Nicole Gibbs
- (Slovakia) Daniela Hantuchová
- (United States) CoCo Vandeweghe

The following players received entry from the qualifying draw:

- (Chinese Taipei) Chan Yung-jan
- (United States) Alexa Glatch
- (Kazakhstan) Sesil Karatantcheva
- (Portugal) Michelle Larcher de Brito

The following players received entry as lucky loser:

- (United States) Melanie Oudin

=== Withdrawals ===
- (Romania) Sorana Cîrstea (right adductor strain)
- (Germany) Angelique Kerber (low back injury)
- (Russia) Svetlana Kuznetsova (right knee injury)
- (Germany) Sabine Lisicki (abdominal Injury)
- (Romania) Monica Niculescu (left hand injury)
- (Austria) Tamira Paszek (left thigh injury)

=== Retirements ===
- (Belgium) Yanina Wickmayer (low-back injury)

== Doubles main-draw entrants ==
=== Seeds ===
Country	Player	Country	Player	Rank^{1}	Seed
USA	Liezel Huber	USA	Lisa Raymond	2	1
USA	Vania King	RUS	Nadia Petrova	19	2
USA	Raquel Kops-Jones	USA	Abigail Spears	39	3
RSA	Natalie Grandin	CZE	Vladimíra Uhlířová	47	4

- ^{1} Rankings are as of July 9, 2012

=== Other entrants ===
The following pair received wildcard into the doubles main draw:

- (Croatia) Mirjana Lučić / (United States) CoCo Vandeweghe
