= 2010 Medibank International Sydney – Men's doubles =

Men's doubles
- 2010 Medibank International Sydney

Final
- Champions: (Canada) Daniel Nestor (Serbia) Nenad Zimonjić
- Runners-up: (United Kingdom) Ross Hutchins (Australia) Jordan Kerr
- Score: 6–3, 7–6^{(7–5)}

Events
Singles	men	women
Doubles	men	women
← 2009 ·	Medibank International Sydney	· 2011 →

Bob Bryan and Mike Bryan were the defending champions in 2010, but chose not to participate.

Daniel Nestor and Nenad Zimonjić won in the final, 6–3, 7–6^{(7–5)}, against Ross Hutchins and Jordan Kerr.

== Seeds ==
1. (Canada) Daniel Nestor / (Serbia) Nenad Zimonjić (champions)
2. (United States) Mardy Fish / (The Bahamas) Mark Knowles (first round, retired)
3. (Poland) Łukasz Kubot / (Austria) Oliver Marach (quarterfinals)
4. (Czech Republic) František Čermák / (Slovakia) Michal Mertiňák (first round)

== Main draw ==
=== Key ===
- Q = Qualifier
- WC = Wild card
- LL = Lucky loser
- Alt = Alternate
- SE = Special exempt
- PR = Protected ranking
- ITF = ITF entry
- JE = Junior exempt
- w/o = Walkover
- r = Retired
- d = Defaulted
- SR = Special ranking

=== Draw ===
First round
1	(Canada) D Nestor (Serbia) N Zimonjić	6	6
(Poland) M Fyrstenberg (Poland) M Matkowski	2	4
(Germany) C Kas (Belgium) D Norman	6	6
(Uruguay) P Cuevas (Italy) A Seppi	3	3
4	(Czech Republic) F Čermák (Slovakia) M Mertiňák	3	6^{4}
ALT	(Germany) B Becker (United States) S Lipsky	6	7
(Russia) I Andreev (Kazakhstan) E Korolev	6	5	[10]
(France) J Benneteau (France) R Gasquet	3	7	[3]
(United Kingdom) R Hutchins (Australia) J Kerr	6	2	[10]
(United States) E Butorac (United States) R Ram	3	6	[6]
(France) M Llodra (Israel) A Ram	4	6^{4}
3	(Poland) Ł Kubot (Austria) O Marach	6	7
WC	(Australia) P Luczak (Finland) J Nieminen	6^{11}	6	[8]
(Sweden) S Aspelin (Australia) P Hanley	7	4	[10]
WC	(Australia) C Ball (Australia) S Huss	0
2	(United States) M Fish (The Bahamas) M Knowles	1	r

Quarterfinals
1	(Canada) D Nestor (Serbia) N Zimonjić	6	4	[10]
(Germany) C Kas (Belgium) D Norman	2	6	[5]
ALT	(Germany) B Becker (United States) S Lipsky	5	0	r
(Russia) I Andreev (Kazakhstan) E Korolev	7	1
(United Kingdom) R Hutchins (Australia) J Kerr	7	6
3	(Poland) Ł Kubot (Austria) O Marach	6^{3}	1
(Sweden) S Aspelin (Australia) P Hanley	3	7	[10]
WC	(Australia) C Ball (Australia) S Huss	6	6^{5}	[8]

Semifinals
1	(Canada) D Nestor (Serbia) N Zimonjić	6	7
(Russia) I Andreev (Kazakhstan) E Korolev	0	6^{4}
(United Kingdom) R Hutchins (Australia) J Kerr	7	6
(Sweden) S Aspelin (Australia) P Hanley	5	3

Final
1	(Canada) D Nestor (Serbia) N Zimonjić	6	7
(United Kingdom) R Hutchins (Australia) J Kerr	3	6^{5}
