= 2012 Apia International Sydney – Women's doubles =

Women's doubles
- 2012 Apia International Sydney

Final
- Champions: (Czech Republic) Květa Peschke (Slovenia) Katarina Srebotnik
- Runners-up: (United States) Liezel Huber (United States) Lisa Raymond
- Score: 6–1, 4–6, [13–11]

Events
Singles	men	women
Doubles	men	women
← 2011 ·	Sydney International	· 2013 →

Iveta Benešová and Barbora Záhlavová-Strýcová were the defending champions but were eliminated in the first round.

Květa Peschke and Katarina Srebotnik defeated American duo Liezel Huber and Lisa Raymond in the final, 6–1, 4–6, [13–11] to claim the title.

== Seeds ==
1. (Czech Republic) Květa Peschke / (Slovenia) Katarina Srebotnik (champions)
2. (United States) Liezel Huber / (United States) Lisa Raymond (final)
3. (Argentina) Gisela Dulko / (Italy) Flavia Pennetta (first round)
4. (Russia) Maria Kirilenko / (Russia) Nadia Petrova (semifinals)

== Draw ==
=== Key ===
- Q = Qualifier
- WC = Wild card
- LL = Lucky loser
- Alt = Alternate
- SE = Special exempt
- PR = Protected ranking
- ITF = ITF entry
- JE = Junior exempt
- w/o = Walkover
- r = Retired
- d = Defaulted
- SR = Special ranking

=== Draw ===
First round
1	(Czech Republic) K Peschke (Slovenia) K Srebotnik	6	1	[10]
(Czech Republic) I Benešová (Czech Republic) B Záhlavová-Strýcová	4	6	[4]
(India) S Mirza (Italy) R Vinci	3	6	[8]
(Russia) A Kudryavtseva (Russia) E Makarova	6	4	[10]
3	(Argentina) G Dulko (Italy) F Pennetta	4	5
(United States) R Kops-Jones (United States) A Spears	6	7
WC	(Sweden) S Arvidsson (Australia) J Dokić	6	6
(Romania) A Dulgheru (Netherlands) M Krajicek	1	3
Alt	(Greece) E Daniilidou (Thailand) T Tanasugarn	6^{7}	2
(South Africa) N Grandin (Czech Republic) V Uhlířová	7^{9}	6
Alt	(Australia) S Bengson (Australia) T Calderwood	6^{2}	4
4	(Russia) M Kirilenko (Russia) N Petrova	7^{7}	6
WC	(Czech Republic) L Šafářová (Russia) V Zvonareva	6	6
(Russia) V Dushevina (Spain) N Llagostera Vives	3	4
(Slovenia) A Klepač (Poland) A Rosolska	3	1
2	(United States) L Huber (United States) L Raymond	6	6

Quarterfinals
1	(Czech Republic) K Peschke (Slovenia) K Srebotnik	6	7
(Russia) A Kudryavtseva (Russia) E Makarova	1	5
(United States) R Kops-Jones (United States) A Spears	6	6
WC	(Sweden) S Arvidsson (Australia) J Dokić	2	3
(South Africa) N Grandin (Czech Republic) V Uhlířová	4	6	[6]
4	(Russia) M Kirilenko (Russia) N Petrova	6	4	[10]
WC	(Czech Republic) L Šafářová (Russia) V Zvonareva	7	4	[8]
2	(United States) L Huber (United States) L Raymond	5	6	[10]

Semifinals
1	(Czech Republic) K Peschke (Slovenia) K Srebotnik	6^{2}	6	[10]
(United States) R Kops-Jones (United States) A Spears	7^{7}	3	[5]
4	(Russia) M Kirilenko (Russia) N Petrova	6^{6}	4
2	(United States) L Huber (United States) L Raymond	7^{8}	6

Final
1	(Czech Republic) K Peschke (Slovenia) K Srebotnik	6	4	[13]
2	(United States) L Huber (United States) L Raymond	1	6	[11]
