= 2012 Mercury Insurance Open – Doubles =

Doubles
- 2012 Mercury Insurance Open

Final
- Champions: (United States) Raquel Kops-Jones (United States) Abigail Spears
- Runners-up: (United States) Vania King (Russia) Nadia Petrova
- Score: 6–2, 6–4

Details
- Draw: 16
- Seeds: 4

Events
Singles	Doubles
- San Diego Open

Květa Peschke and Katarina Srebotnik were the defending champions but chose not to participate.
Raquel Kops-Jones and Abigail Spears won the final 6–2, 6–4 against Vania King and Nadia Petrova.

== Seeds ==
1. (United States) Liezel Huber / (United States) Lisa Raymond (semifinals)
2. (United States) Vania King / (Russia) Nadia Petrova (final)
3. (United States) Raquel Kops-Jones / (United States) Abigail Spears (champions)
4. (South Africa) Natalie Grandin / (Czech Republic) Vladimíra Uhlířová (first round)

== Draw ==
Key

- Q = Qualifier
- WC = Wild card
- LL = Lucky loser
- Alt = Alternate
- ITF = ITF entry
- PR = Protected ranking
- SR = Special ranking
- SE = Special exempt
- JE = Junior exempt
- JR = Junior Accelerator Programme entrant
- CO = College Accelerator Programme entrant
- NG = Next Gen Accelerator Program entrant
- w/o = Walkover
- r = Retired
- d = Defaulted

=== Draw ===
First round
1	(United States) L Huber (United States) L Raymond	6	6
WC	(Croatia) M Lučić (United States) C Vandeweghe	4	3
(United States) B Mattek-Sands (India) S Mirza	7	4	[5]
(Chinese Taipei) H-c Chan (Chinese Taipei) Y-j Chan	5	6	[10]
3	(United States) R Kops-Jones (United States) A Spears	7^{7}	6
(Greece) E Daniilidou (Australia) J Gajdošová	6^{5}	4
(Japan) R Fujiwara (China) S Zheng	0	4
(United States) L Lee-Waters (United States) M Moulton-Levy	6	6
(Chinese Taipei) K-c Chang (Thailand) N Lertcheewakarn	6	1	[10]
(United Kingdom) A Keothavong (United States) J Pegula	2	6	[8]
(Slovakia) J Husárová (United Kingdom) H Watson	6	7
4	(South Africa) N Grandin (Czech Republic) V Uhlířová	4	5
(Slovakia) D Cibulková (Slovakia) D Hantuchová	3	6	[10]
(Latvia) L Dekmeijere (United States) V Lepchenko	6	3	[5]
(United States) A Glatch (United States) M Oudin	5	2
2	(United States) V King (Russia) N Petrova	7	6

Quarterfinals
1	(United States) L Huber (United States) L Raymond	6	7^{7}
(Chinese Taipei) H-c Chan (Chinese Taipei) Y-j Chan	2	6^{3}
3	(United States) R Kops-Jones (United States) A Spears	6	4	[10]
(United States) L Lee-Waters (United States) M Moulton-Levy	3	6	[3]
(Chinese Taipei) K-c Chang (Thailand) N Lertcheewakarn	6	2	[10]
(Slovakia) J Husárová (United Kingdom) H Watson	4	6	[8]
(Slovakia) D Cibulková (Slovakia) D Hantuchová	4	2
2	(United States) V King (Russia) N Petrova	6	6

Semifinals
1	(United States) L Huber (United States) L Raymond	5	6	[12]
3	(United States) R Kops-Jones (United States) A Spears	7	4	[14]
(Chinese Taipei) K-c Chang (Thailand) N Lertcheewakarn	2	5
2	(United States) V King (Russia) N Petrova	6	7

Final
3	(United States) R Kops-Jones (United States) A Spears	6	6
2	(United States) V King (Russia) N Petrova	2	4
