= 2010 Medibank International Sydney – Women's singles =

Women's singles
- 2010 Medibank International Sydney

Final
- Champion: (Russia) Elena Dementieva
- Runner-up: (United States) Serena Williams
- Score: 6–3, 6–2

Details
- Draw: 30
- Seeds: 8

Events
| Singles | men | women |
| Doubles | men | women |
- Sydney International

In a rematch of last year's semifinal, Elena Dementieva successfully defended her title, beating world No. 1 Serena Williams in the final 6–3, 6–2.

== Seeds ==
The top two seeds receive a bye to the second round.

1. (United States) Serena Williams (final)
2. (Russia) Dinara Safina (quarterfinals)
3. (Russia) Svetlana Kuznetsova (second round)
4. (Denmark) Caroline Wozniacki (first round)
5. (Russia) Elena Dementieva (champion)
6. (Belarus) Victoria Azarenka (semifinals)
7. (Serbia) Jelena Janković (first round)
8. (Russia) Vera Zvonareva (first round, retired due to right ankle injury)

== Draw ==
Key

- Q = Qualifier
- WC = Wild card
- LL = Lucky loser
- Alt = Alternate
- ITF = ITF entry
- PR = Protected ranking
- SR = Special ranking
- SE = Special exempt
- JE = Junior exempt
- JR = Junior Accelerator Programme entrant
- CO = College Accelerator Programme entrant
- NG = Next Gen Accelerator Program entrant
- w/o = Walkover
- r = Retired
- d = Defaulted

=== Finals ===
Semifinals
1 | (United States) Serena Williams | 3 | 7 | 6
(France) Aravane Rezaï | 6 | 5 | 4
6 | (Belarus) Victoria Azarenka | 3 | 1
5 | (Russia) Elena Dementieva | 6 | 6

Final
1 | (United States) Serena Williams | 3 | 2
5 | (Russia) Elena Dementieva | 6 | 6

=== Top half ===
First round
(Spain) MJ Martínez Sánchez | 6 | 6
Q | (United States) V Lepchenko | 3 | 3
Q | (Russia) V Dushevina | 6 | 6
WC | (Australia) C Dellacqua | 2 | 2
(Russia) E Vesnina | 3
8 | (Russia) V Zvonareva | 3 | r
4 | (Denmark) C Wozniacki | 6 | 3 | 2
(China) N Li | 2 | 6 | 6
(Australia) S Stosur | 3 | 1
(Italy) F Pennetta | 6 | 6
(France) A Rezaï | 6^{3} | 6 | 6
Q | (Germany) A Grönefeld | 7 | 2 | 2
Q | (Hungary) Á Szávay | 5 | 6 | 7
7 | (Serbia) J Janković | 7 | 1 | 5

Second round
1 | (United States) S Williams | 6 | 6
(Spain) MJ Martínez Sánchez | 1 | 2
Q | (Russia) V Dushevina | 6 | 6
(Russia) E Vesnina | 3 | 4
(China) N Li | 2 | 6^{4}
(Italy) F Pennetta | 6 | 7
(France) A Rezaï | 6 | 7
Q | (Hungary) Á Szávay | 3 | 6^{5}

Quarterfinals
1 | (United States) S Williams | 6 | 6
Q | (Russia) V Dushevina | 2 | 2
(Italy) F Pennetta | 3 | 0
(France) A Rezaï | 6 | 6

Semifinals
1 | (United States) S Williams | 3 | 7 | 6
(France) A Rezaï | 6 | 5 | 4

=== Bottom half ===
First round
6 | (Belarus) V Azarenka | 3 | 6 | 7
(Germany) S Lisicki | 6 | 2 | 5
(Russia) N Petrova | 3 | 7 | 4
Q | (Japan) K Date-Krumm | 6 | 5 | 6
LL | (Switzerland) T Bacsinszky | 6^{2} | 1
(Slovakia) D Cibulková | 7 | 6
(Russia) A Kleybanova | 2 | 7 | 5
3 | (Russia) S Kuznetsova | 6 | 6^{3} | 7
5 | (Russia) E Dementieva | 6 | 7
(Italy) F Schiavone | 2 | 5
(France) V Razzano | 3 | 0
(Slovakia) D Hantuchová | 6 | 6
Q | (United States) J Craybas | 0 | 4
(Poland) A Radwańska | 6 | 6

Second round
6 | (Belarus) V Azarenka | 6 | 5 | 7
Q | (Japan) K Date-Krumm | 1 | 7 | 5
(Slovakia) D Cibulková | 7 | 6
3 | (Russia) S Kuznetsova | 5 | 2
5 | (Russia) E Dementieva | 6 | 4 | 6
(Slovakia) D Hantuchová | 2 | 6 | 2
(Poland) A Radwańska | 5 | 4
2 | (Russia) D Safina | 7 | 6

Quarterfinals
6 | (Belarus) V Azarenka | 2 | 6 | 7
(Slovakia) D Cibulková | 6 | 2 | 5
5 | (Russia) E Dementieva | 6 | 6
2 | (Russia) D Safina | 2 | 3

Semifinals
6 | (Belarus) V Azarenka | 3 | 1
5 | (Russia) E Dementieva | 6 | 6
