= 2012 Apia International Sydney – Men's doubles =

Men's doubles
- 2012 Apia International Sydney

Final
- Champions: (United States) Bob Bryan (United States) Mike Bryan
- Runners-up: (Australia) Matthew Ebden (Finland) Jarkko Nieminen
- Score: 6–1, 6–4

Events
Singles	men	women
Doubles	men	women
← 2011 ·	Sydney International	· 2013 →

Lukáš Dlouhý and Paul Hanley were the defending champions but decided not to participate. Bob and Mike Bryan won in the final against Matthew Ebden and Jarkko Nieminen, 6–1, 6–4

== Seeds ==
1. (United States) Bob Bryan / (United States) Mike Bryan (champions)
2. (Belarus) Max Mirnyi / (Canada) Daniel Nestor (quarterfinals)
3. (Poland) Mariusz Fyrstenberg / (Poland) Marcin Matkowski (first round)
4. (Sweden) Robert Lindstedt / (Romania) Horia Tecău (first round)

== Draw ==
=== Key ===
- Q = Qualifier
- WC = Wild card
- LL = Lucky loser
- Alt = Alternate
- SE = Special exempt
- PR = Protected ranking
- ITF = ITF entry
- JE = Junior exempt
- w/o = Walkover
- r = Retired
- d = Defaulted
- SR = Special ranking

=== Draw ===
First round
1	(United States) B Bryan (United States) M Bryan	7	6
(Pakistan) A-u-H Qureshi (Curaçao) J-J Rojer	5	4
(India) L Paes (Czech Republic) R Štěpánek	7^{7}	6
(Italy) F Fognini (Russia) D Tursunov	6^{3}	3
4	(Sweden) R Lindstedt (Romania) H Tecău	1	7^{7}	[3]
(Croatia) I Dodig (Ukraine) S Stakhovsky	6	6^{2}	[10]
(United Kingdom) C Fleming (United Kingdom) R Hutchins	6	6
(Spain) M Granollers (Poland) Ł Kubot	3	3
(Germany) M Kohlmann (Germany) P Petzschner	3	4
(Belgium) X Malisse (Belgium) D Norman	6	6
WC	(Australia) C Ebelthite (Australia) M Matosevic	7^{7}	7^{7}
3	(Poland) M Fyrstenberg (Poland) M Matkowski	6^{4}	6^{3}
WC	(Australia) M Ebden (Finland) J Nieminen	6	6^{6}	[10]
(Spain) P Andújar (Spain) M López	1	7^{8}	[3]
(United States) J Isner (United States) R Sweeting	4	2
2	(Belarus) M Mirnyi (Canada) D Nestor	6	6

Quarterfinals
1	(United States) B Bryan (United States) M Bryan	7^{7}	7^{9}
(India) L Paes (Czech Republic) R Štěpánek	6^{5}	6^{7}
(Croatia) I Dodig (Ukraine) S Stakhovsky	1	2
(United Kingdom) C Fleming (United Kingdom) R Hutchins	6	6
(Belgium) X Malisse (Belgium) D Norman	7	4	[9]
WC	(Australia) C Ebelthite (Australia) M Matosevic	5	6	[11]
WC	(Australia) M Ebden (Finland) J Nieminen	0	6	[10]
2	(Belarus) M Mirnyi (Canada) D Nestor	6	4	[4]

Semifinals
1	(United States) B Bryan (United States) M Bryan	6	6
(United Kingdom) C Fleming (United Kingdom) R Hutchins	4	2
WC	(Australia) C Ebelthite (Australia) M Matosevic	3	6^{4}
WC	(Australia) M Ebden (Finland) J Nieminen	6	7^{7}

Final
1	(United States) B Bryan (United States) M Bryan	6	6
WC	(Australia) M Ebden (Finland) J Nieminen	1	4
