= 2012 Apia International Sydney – Women's singles =

Women's singles
- 2012 Apia International Sydney

Final
- Champion: (Belarus) Victoria Azarenka
- Runner-up: (China) Li Na
- Score: 6–2, 1–6, 6–3

Details
- Draw: 30 (6 Q / 2 WC )
- Seeds: 8

Events
Singles	men	women
Doubles	men	women
- Sydney International

Li Na was the defending champion, but lost the final against Victoria Azarenka, 6–2, 1–6, 6–3.

== Seeds ==
The top two seeds received a bye into the second round.

1. (Denmark) Caroline Wozniacki (quarterfinals)
2. (Czech Republic) Petra Kvitová (semifinals)
3. (Belarus) Victoria Azarenka (champion)
4. (China) Li Na (final)
5. (Australia) Samantha Stosur (first round)
6. (Russia) Vera Zvonareva (first round)
7. (Poland) Agnieszka Radwańska (semifinals)
8. (France) Marion Bartoli (quarterfinals)

== Draw ==
Key

- Q = Qualifier
- WC = Wild card
- LL = Lucky loser
- Alt = Alternate
- ITF = ITF entry
- PR = Protected ranking
- SR = Special ranking
- SE = Special exempt
- JE = Junior exempt
- JR = Junior Accelerator Programme entrant
- CO = College Accelerator Programme entrant
- NG = Next Gen Accelerator Program entrant
- w/o = Walkover
- r = Retired
- d = Defaulted

=== Finals ===
Semifinals
7	(Poland) Agnieszka Radwańska	6	3	2
3	(Belarus) Victoria Azarenka	1	6	6
4	(China) Li Na	1	7	6
2	(Czech Republic) Petra Kvitová	6	5	2

Final
3	(Belarus) Victoria Azarenka	6	1	6
4	(China) Li Na	2	6	3

=== Top half ===
First round
(Slovakia) D Cibulková	6	4	6
(China) S Peng	2	6	4
(Russia) A Pavlyuchenkova	2	3
(Germany) A Petkovic	6	6
Q	(Poland) U Radwańska	1	1
7	(Poland) A Radwańska	6	6
3	(Belarus) V Azarenka	6	6
Q	(Switzerland) S Vögele	2	1
(Serbia) J Janković	6	3
(Germany) J Görges	1	1^{r}
WC	(Australia) J Dokić	6	6
WC	(Australia) I Holland	0	0
LL	(Slovenia) P Hercog	3	3
8	(France) M Bartoli	6	6

Second round
1	(Denmark) C Wozniacki	7	2	6
(Slovakia) D Cibulková	5	6	4
(Germany) A Petkovic	5	4
7	(Poland) A Radwańska	7	6
3	(Belarus) V Azarenka	6	6
(Serbia) J Janković	4	2
WC	(Australia) J Dokić	0	3
8	(France) M Bartoli	6	6

Quarterfinals
1	(Denmark) C Wozniacki	6	5	2
7	(Poland) A Radwańska	3	7	6
3	(Belarus) V Azarenka	7	6
8	(France) M Bartoli	5	4

Semifinals
7	(Poland) A Radwańska	6	3	2
3	(Belarus) V Azarenka	1	6	6

=== Bottom half ===
First round
6	(Russia) V Zvonareva	1	2
(Russia) S Kuznetsova	6	6
(Czech Republic) L Šafářová	7^{7}	6
(Serbia) A Ivanovic	6^{5}	2
Q	(Hungary) M Czink	4	2
Q	(South Africa) C Scheepers	6	6
Q	(Russia) E Makarova	0	3
4	(China) N Li	6	6
5	(Australia) S Stosur	2	4
(Italy) F Schiavone	6	6
(Italy) R Vinci	5	2
(Slovakia) D Hantuchová	7	6
LL	(Romania) A Dulgheru	6	6
Q	(Sweden) S Arvidsson	1	1

Second round
(Russia) S Kuznetsova	1	0^{r}
(Czech Republic) L Šafářová	6	2
Q	(South Africa) C Scheepers	6	4	1
4	(China) N Li	2	6	6
(Italy) F Schiavone	5	1
(Slovakia) D Hantuchová	7	6
LL	(Romania) A Dulgheru	5	6	4
2	(Czech Republic) P Kvitová	7	3	6

Quarterfinals
(Czech Republic) L Šafářová	2	6^{3}
4	(China) N Li	6	7^{7}
(Slovakia) D Hantuchová	0	4
2	(Czech Republic) P Kvitová	6	6

Semifinals
4	(China) N Li	1	7	6
2	(Czech Republic) P Kvitová	6	5	2

== Qualifying ==
=== Seeds ===
1. (Russia) Maria Kirilenko (second round)
2. (Estonia) ~~Kaia Kanepi~~ (withdrew due to winning Brisbane)
3. (Slovenia) Polona Hercog (qualifying competition, lucky loser)
4. (South Africa) Chanelle Scheepers (qualified)
5. (Austria) Tamira Paszek (first round)
6. (Czech Republic) Barbora Záhlavová Strýcová (second round)
7. (Russia) Ekaterina Makarova (qualified)
8. (Czech Republic) Iveta Benešová (second round)
9. (Belarus) Anastasiya Yakimova (first round)
10. (Romania) Alexandra Dulgheru (qualifying competition, lucky loser)
11. (United Kingdom) Anne Keothavong (first round)
12. (France) Pauline Parmentier (first round)
13. (United States) Vania King (qualifying competition, withdrew)

=== Qualifiers ===
1. (Sweden) Sofia Arvidsson
2. (Poland) Urszula Radwańska
3. (Russia) Ekaterina Makarova
4. (South Africa) Chanelle Scheepers
5. (Switzerland) Stefanie Vögele
6. (Hungary) Melinda Czink

=== Lucky losers ===
1. (Romania) Alexandra Dulgheru
2. (Slovenia) Polona Hercog

=== Qualifying draw ===
==== First qualifier ====
First round
1/WC	(Russia) Maria Kirilenko	1	6	7^{7}
(United States) Varvara Lepchenko	6	2	6^{5}
(Japan) Erika Sema	3	7^{7}	3
(Sweden) Sofia Arvidsson	6	6^{4}	6
(France) Iryna Brémond	2	2
Alt	(Slovenia) Andreja Klepač	6	6
(Australia) Monique Adamczak	4	1
10	(Romania) Alexandra Dulgheru	6	6

Second round
1/WC	(Russia) Maria Kirilenko	3	0
(Sweden) Sofia Arvidsson	6	6
Alt	(Slovenia) Andreja Klepač	4	4
10	(Romania) Alexandra Dulgheru	6	6

Qualifying competition
(Sweden) Sofia Arvidsson	6^{6}	7^{7}	7
10	(Romania) Alexandra Dulgheru	7^{8}	6^{2}	5

==== Second qualifier ====
First round
13	(United States) Vania King	5	6	6
(Netherlands) Arantxa Rus	7	3	1
(Austria) Patricia Mayr-Achleitner	0	1^{r}
(Argentina) Paula Ormaechea	6	3
WC	(Australia) Sally Peers	2	2
(Poland) Urszula Radwańska	6	6
(Spain) Lourdes Domínguez Lino	6^{0}	2
8	(Czech Republic) Iveta Benešová	7^{7}	6

Second round
13	(United States) Vania King	6	7^{7}
(Argentina) Paula Ormaechea	1	6^{3}
(Poland) Urszula Radwańska	6	6
8	(Czech Republic) Iveta Benešová	4	1

Qualifying competition
13	(United States) Vania King
(Poland) Urszula Radwańska	w/o

==== Third qualifier ====
First round
3	(Slovenia) Polona Hercog	7^{7}	6
Alt	(Romania) Elena Bogdan	6^{3}	3
(Georgia (country)) Anna Tatishvili	3	6	4
WC	(Australia) Viktorija Rajicic	6	4	6
(France) Kristina Mladenovic	6	3	6
(Russia) Vera Dushevina	2	6	2
(France) Aravane Rezaï	2	0^{r}
7	(Russia) Ekaterina Makarova	6	0

Second round
3	(Slovenia) Polona Hercog	7	6
WC	(Australia) Viktorija Rajicic	5	4
(France) Kristina Mladenovic	6	2	3
7	(Russia) Ekaterina Makarova	4	6	6

Qualifying competition
3	(Slovenia) Polona Hercog	1	3
7	(Russia) Ekaterina Makarova	6	6

==== Fourth qualifier ====
First round
4	(South Africa) Chanelle Scheepers	6	6
WC	(Australia) Azra Hadzic	3	0
WC	(Russia) Arina Rodionova	7^{7}	6
WC	(Australia) Tammi Patterson	6^{3}	3
(France) Alizé Cornet	6	4
(Russia) Anastasia Pivovarova	2	1^{r}
(Croatia) Mirjana Lučić	6	6
9	(Belarus) Anastasiya Yakimova	2	1

Second round
4	(South Africa) Chanelle Scheepers	6	6
WC	(Russia) Arina Rodionova	2	1
(France) Alizé Cornet	6	1	6
(Croatia) Mirjana Lučić	4	6	1

Qualifying competition
4	(South Africa) Chanelle Scheepers	6	6
(France) Alizé Cornet	4	4

==== Fifth qualifier ====
First round
5	(Austria) Tamira Paszek	0	6^{7}
(Serbia) Bojana Jovanovski	6	7^{9}
(France) Virginie Razzano	6	6
(Thailand) Tamarine Tanasugarn	2	3
Alt	(France) Victoria Larrière	3	3
(Switzerland) Stefanie Vögele	6	6
(Netherlands) Michaëlla Krajicek	2	6	7
11	(United Kingdom) Anne Keothavong	6	2	5

Second round
(Serbia) Bojana Jovanovski	6^{6}	7	7
(France) Virginie Razzano	7^{8}	5	5
(Switzerland) Stefanie Vögele	6	6
(Netherlands) Michaëlla Krajicek	2	4

Qualifying competition
(Serbia) Bojana Jovanovski	6	4	2
(Switzerland) Stefanie Vögele	3	6	6

==== Sixth qualifier ====
First round
6	(Czech Republic) Barbora Záhlavová Strýcová	6	5	7^{7}
(Luxembourg) Mandy Minella	3	7	6^{4}
(Spain) Sílvia Soler Espinosa	2	1
(Hungary) Melinda Czink	6	6
(Russia) Alla Kudryavtseva	5	6	4
(France) Stéphanie Foretz Gacon	7	3	6
(Greece) Eleni Daniilidou	6	6
12	(France) Pauline Parmentier	4	3

Second round
6	(Czech Republic) Barbora Záhlavová Strýcová	6^{3}	7	4
(Hungary) Melinda Czink	7^{7}	5	6
(France) Stéphanie Foretz Gacon	6^{4}	2
(Greece) Eleni Daniilidou	7^{7}	6

Qualifying competition
(Hungary) Melinda Czink	6^{5}	6	6
(Greece) Eleni Daniilidou	7^{7}	4	4
