= 2012 Apia International Sydney =

- Date: 8–15 January
- Edition: 120th
- Surface: Hard / outdoor
- Location: Sydney, Australia

Champions

Men's singles
- (Finland) Jarkko Nieminen

Women's singles
- (Belarus) Victoria Azarenka

Men's doubles
- (United States) Bob Bryan / (United States) Mike Bryan

Women's doubles
- (Czech Republic) Květa Peschke / (Slovenia) Katarina Srebotnik
- Sydney International

The 2012 Apia International Sydney was a joint ATP and WTA tennis tournament, that was played on outdoor hard courts. It was the 120th edition of the Apia International Sydney and was a part of the ATP World Tour 250 series of the 2012 ATP World Tour, and of the WTA Premier tournaments of the 2012 WTA Tour. Both the men's and the women's events took place at the NSW Tennis Centre in Sydney, Australia, from 8 to 15 January 2012. Due to rain, the men's singles and doubles finals had to be rescheduled from the evening of 14 January to the morning of 15 January, the day before the Australian Open was due to begin. Jarkko Nieminen and Victoria Azarenka won the singles titles.

== ATP singles main-draw entrants ==
=== Seeds ===
Country	Player	Rank^{1}	Seed
ARG	Juan Martín del Potro	11	1
USA	John Isner	18	2
FRA	Richard Gasquet	19	3
ESP	Feliciano López	20	4
SRB	Viktor Troicki	22	5
GER	Florian Mayer	23	6
ESP	Marcel Granollers	27	7
CZE	Radek Štěpánek	28	8
RUS	Alex Bogomolov Jr.	34	9

|-

- ^{1} Rankings as of 26 December 2011.

=== Other entrants ===
The following players received wildcards into the singles main draw:

- (Australia) James Duckworth
- (Australia) Matthew Ebden
- (Australia) Lleyton Hewitt

The following players received entry from the qualifying draw:

- (Uzbekistan) Denis Istomin
- (Finland) Jarkko Nieminen
- (United States) Bobby Reynolds
- (United States) Michael Russell

The following players received entry from a lucky loser spot:

- (United States) Ryan Sweeting

=== Withdrawals ===
- (Germany) Florian Mayer (right hip injury)

== ATP doubles main-draw entrants ==
=== Seeds ===
Country	Player	Country	Player	Rank^{1}	Seed
USA	Bob Bryan	USA	Mike Bryan	2	1
BLR	Max Mirnyi	CAN	Daniel Nestor	6	2
POL	Mariusz Fyrstenberg	POL	Marcin Matkowski	28	3
SWE	Robert Lindstedt	ROU	Horia Tecău	28	4

- ^{1} Rankings are as of 26 December 2011

=== Other entrants ===
The following pairs received wildcards into the doubles main draw:

- (Australia) Matthew Ebden / (Finland) Jarkko Nieminen
- (Australia) Colin Ebelthite / (Australia) Marinko Matosevic

== WTA singles main-draw entrants ==
=== Seeds ===
Country	Player	Rank^{1}	Seed
DEN	Caroline Wozniacki	1	1
CZE	Petra Kvitová	2	2
BLR	Victoria Azarenka	3	3
CHN	Li Na	5	4
AUS	Samantha Stosur	6	5
RUS	Vera Zvonareva	7	6
POL	Agnieszka Radwańska	8	7
FRA	Marion Bartoli	9	8

- ^{1} Rankings as of 26 December 2011

=== Other entrants ===
The following players received wildcards into the singles main draw:

- (Australia) Jelena Dokić
- (Australia) Isabella Holland

The following players received entry from the qualifying draw:

- (Sweden) Sofia Arvidsson
- (Hungary) Melinda Czink
- (Russia) Ekaterina Makarova
- (Poland) Urszula Radwańska
- (South Africa) Chanelle Scheepers
- (Switzerland) Stefanie Vögele

The following players received entry from a lucky loser spot:

- (Romania) Alexandra Dulgheru
- (Slovenia) Polona Hercog

=== Withdrawals ===
- (Germany) Sabine Lisicki (abdominal strain)
- (Italy) Flavia Pennetta (back injury)

=== Retirements ===
- (Germany) Julia Görges (viral illness)
- (Russia) Svetlana Kuznetsova (heat illness)

== WTA doubles main-draw entrants ==
=== Seeds ===
Country	Player	Country	Player	Rank^{1}	Seed
CZE	Květa Peschke	SLO	Katarina Srebotnik	4	1
USA	Liezel Huber	USA	Lisa Raymond	5	2
ARG	Gisela Dulko	ITA	Flavia Pennetta	17	3
RUS	Maria Kirilenko	RUS	Nadia Petrova	20	4

- ^{1} Rankings are as of 26 December 2011

=== Other entrants ===
The following pairs received wildcards into the doubles main draw:

- (Sweden) Sofia Arvidsson / (Australia) Jelena Dokić
- (Czech Republic) Lucie Šafářová / (Russia) Vera Zvonareva

The following pairs received entry as alternates:

- (Australia) Stephanie Bengson / (Australia) Tyra Calderwood
- (Greece) Eleni Daniilidou / (Thailand) Tamarine Tanasugarn

=== Withdrawals ===
- (Germany) Julia Görges (viral illness)
- (Poland) Agnieszka Radwańska

== Finals ==
=== Men's singles ===
(Finland) Jarkko Nieminen defeated (France) Julien Benneteau, 6–2, 7–5

- It was Nieminen's 1st title of the year and 2nd title of his career.

=== Women's singles ===
(Belarus) Victoria Azarenka defeated (China) Li Na, 6–2, 1–6, 6–3

- It was Azarenka's 1st title of the year and 9th of her career. It was her 1st Premier-level title of the year and 3rd of her career.

=== Men's doubles ===
(United States) Bob Bryan / (United States) Mike Bryan defeated (Australia) Matthew Ebden / (Finland) Jarkko Nieminen, 6–1, 6–4

=== Women's doubles ===
(Czech Republic) Květa Peschke / (Slovenia) Katarina Srebotnik defeated (United States) Liezel Huber / (United States) Lisa Raymond, 6–1, 4–6, [13–11]
