= 2011 Medibank International Sydney – Men's singles =

Men's singles
- 2011 Medibank International Sydney

Final
- Champion: (France) Gilles Simon
- Runner-up: (Serbia) Viktor Troicki
- Score: 7–5, 7–6^{(7–4)}

Details
- Draw: 28
- Seeds: 8

Events
Singles	men	women
Doubles	men	women
← 2010 ·	Sydney International	· 2012 →

Marcos Baghdatis was the defending champion after defeating Richard Gasquet in the 2010 final but had to withdraw from the tournament in 2011.
Gilles Simon won the championships by beating 4th seed Viktor Troicki 7–5, 7–6^{(7–4)} in the final.

== Seeds ==
The top four seeds receive a bye to the second round.

1. (United States) Sam Querrey (second round)
2. (Cyprus) Marcos Baghdatis (withdrew due to a groin injury)
3. (Latvia) Ernests Gulbis (semifinals)
4. (Serbia) Viktor Troicki (final)
5. (France) Richard Gasquet (quarterfinals)
6. (Spain) Feliciano López (first round)
7. (Spain) Guillermo García López (second round)
8. (Chinese Taipei) Lu Yen-hsun (first round)

== Draw ==
=== Key ===
- Q = Qualifier
- WC = Wild card
- LL = Lucky loser
- Alt = Alternate
- SE = Special exempt
- PR = Protected ranking
- ITF = ITF entry
- JE = Junior exempt
- w/o = Walkover
- r = Retired
- d = Defaulted
- SR = Special ranking

=== Finals ===
Semifinals
(France) Gilles Simon	7	6
3	(Latvia) Ernests Gulbis	6^{1}	0
4	(Serbia) Viktor Troicki	6	7
(Germany) Florian Mayer	4	6^{4}

Final
(France) Gilles Simon	7	7
4	(Serbia) Viktor Troicki	5	6^{4}

=== Top half ===
First round
(Ukraine) A Dolgopolov	6^{3}	6	6
Q	(Australia) B Tomic	7	1	2
Q	(Portugal) F Gil	6
(Finland) J Nieminen	2	r
(France) G Simon	6	6
8	(Chinese Taipei) Y-h Lu	0	3
Q	(Russia) I Andreev	6	6
(France) J Chardy	2	4
(Germany) B Becker	6^{3}	6^{6}
(Ukraine) S Stakhovsky	7	7
Q	(Australia) C Guccione	6^{5}	5
7	(Spain) G García López	7	7

Second round
1	(United States) S Querrey	4	3
(Ukraine) A Dolgopolov	6	6
Q	(Portugal) F Gil	1	3
(France) G Simon	6	6
3	(Latvia) E Gulbis	2	6	6
Q	(Russia) I Andreev	6	4	3
(Ukraine) S Stakhovsky	6	6
7	(Spain) G García López	3	4

Quarterfinals
(Ukraine) A Dolgopolov	4	3
(France) G Simon	6	6
3	(Latvia) E Gulbis	6	6
(Ukraine) S Stakhovsky	4	4

Semifinals
(France) G Simon	7	6
3	(Latvia) E Gulbis	6^{1}	0

=== Bottom half ===
First round
5	(France) R Gasquet	6	6
WC	(Australia) M Ebden	4	3
(Italy) A Seppi	6	6
(Uzbekistan) D Istomin	1	0
(Argentina) JI Chela	4	6	6
SE	(Czech Republic) R Štěpánek	6	0	3
6	(Spain) F López	7	6^{9}	6^{3}
WC	(Argentina) JM del Potro	6^{5}	7	7
(Germany) F Mayer	7	6
WC	(United Kingdom) J Ward	5	0
(Italy) P Starace	6^{6}	6	6
(France) J Benneteau	7	3	4

Second round
5	(France) R Gasquet	3	7	6
(Italy) A Seppi	6	5	4
(Argentina) JI Chela	2	3
4	(Serbia) V Troicki	6	6
WC	(Argentina) JM del Potro	2	5
(Germany) F Mayer	6	7
(Italy) P Starace	7	2	6
LL	(Poland) Ł Kubot	6^{5}	6	3

Quarterfinals
5	(France) R Gasquet	4	4
4	(Serbia) V Troicki	6	6
(Germany) F Mayer	6	6
(Italy) P Starace	4	1

Semifinals
4	(Serbia) V Troicki	6	7
(Germany) F Mayer	4	6^{4}
