= Viktorija Rajicic =

Australian tennis player

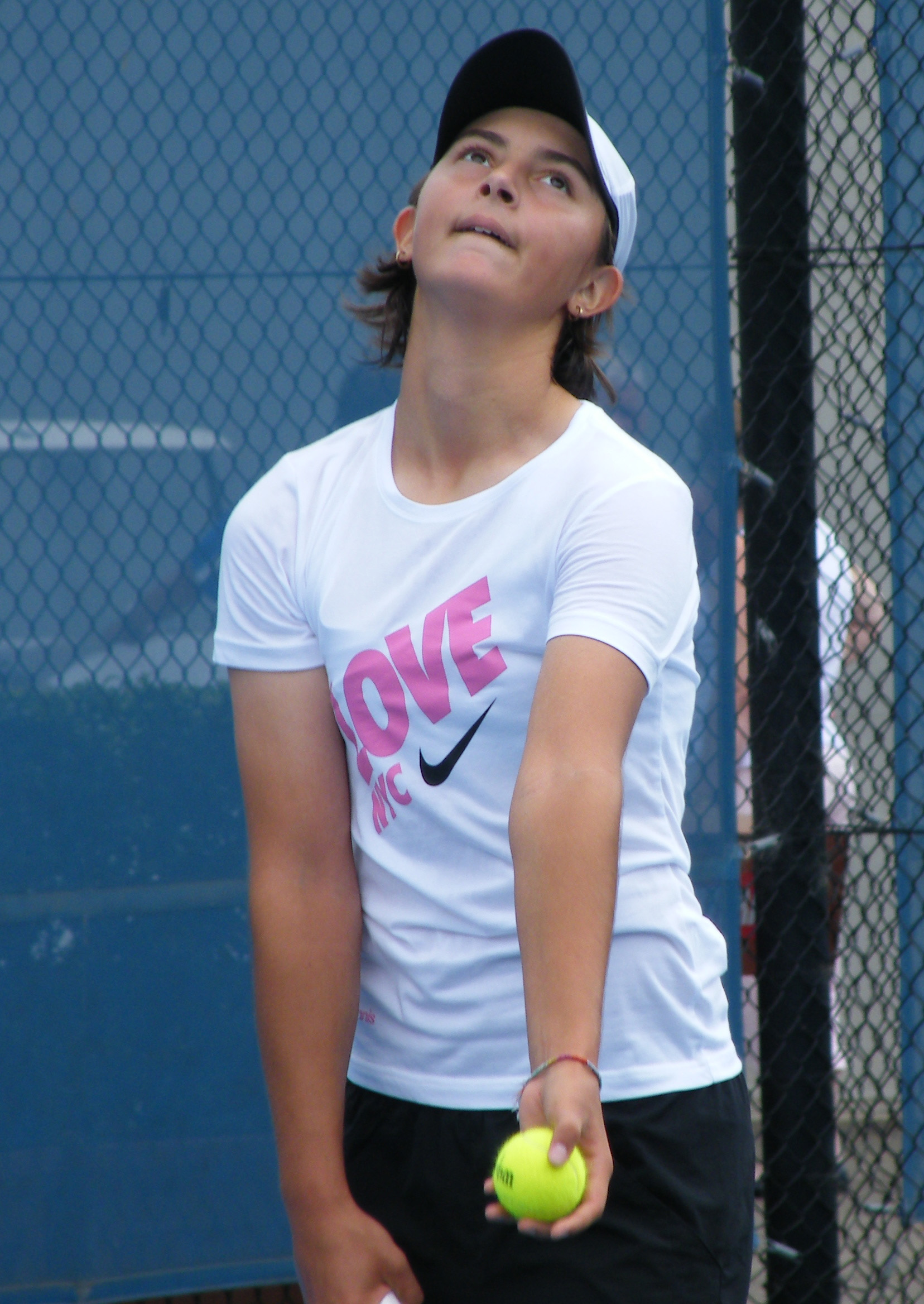
- Country (sports): Australia
- Residence: Melbourne, Australia
- Born: 7 April 1994 (age 31); Melbourne
- Height: 1.70 m (5 ft 7 in)
- Turned pro: 2011
- Plays: Right (two-handed backhand)
- Prize money: $83,151

Singles
- Career record: 114–90
- Career titles: 2 ITF
- Highest ranking: No. 279 (28 October 2013)

Grand Slam singles results
- Australian Open: Q1 (2010, 2011, 2012, 2013)

Doubles
- Career record: 53–60
- Career titles: 2 ITF
- Highest ranking: No. 299 (10 February 2014)

Grand Slam doubles results
- Australian Open: 1R (2011, 2012, 2013)

Viktorija Rajicic (Serbian: Викторија Рајичић, Viktorija Rajičić, pronounced [ʋǐktoːrija rǎjitʃitɕ]; born 7 April 1994) is an Australian former tennis player.

She turned professional, after playing in the first round of the WTA Tour doubles event at the Sydney International on 9 January 2011. In October 2013, she achieved a career-high ranking of world No. 279.

== Career summary ==
Rajicic who resides in Melbourne was coached by Geoff Guy and Chris Mahony.

She received a wildcard into the girls' singles main draw of the 2009 Australian Open. Later in April, she made it to the final of the Optus 16s Autumn Nationals held at the Valley Recreation Club in Glen Iris, Victoria. In October, she represented Australia in the Junior Fed Cup held at San Luis Potosí, Mexico.

In 2011, Rajicic fell in the first singles qualifying rounds at Sydney and the Australian Open. She played doubles at the Sydney International and the Australian Open but both times lost in the first round of the main draw.

Rajicic started the new season by playing in the qualifying draw of the Sydney International. She defeated Anna Tatishvili in the first round but was beaten by Polona Hercog in the second.

In March 2013, Rajicic won her first title defeating Yurika Sema in the final of Bundaberg in straight sets. In October, she jumped 18 spots to a career-high mark of 290, after reaching the quarterfinals of a $25k event in Perth.

Four years later, in October 2017, she played her last match on the professional circuit.

== ITF finals ==
=== Singles (2–1) ===
Legend $50,000 tournaments $25,000 tournaments $10,000 tournaments	Finals by surface Hard (1–0) Clay (1–0) Grass (0–1)

Result	No.	Date	Location	Surface	Opponent	Score
Loss	1.	26 February 2012	Mildura, Australia	Grass	(Australia) Ashleigh Barty	1–6, 6–7^{(8)}
Winr	1.	10 March 2013	Sydney, Australia	Hard	(Australia) Jessica Moore	5–7, 6–3, 6–2
Win	2.	31 March 2013	Bundaberg, Australia	Clay	(Japan) Yurika Sema	6–4, 6–3

=== Doubles (2–3) ===
Legend $25,000 tournaments $10,000 tournaments	Finals by surface Hard (0–1) Clay (2–2)

Result	No.	Date	Location	Surface	Partner	Opponents	Score
Loss	1.	May 2010	Bundaberg, Australia	Clay	(Australia) Emelyn Starr	(Australia) Marija Mirkovic (Australia) Jessica Moore	3–6, 6–1, [7–10]
Loss	2.	Mar 2013	Ipswich, Australia	Hard	(Australia) Storm Sanders	(Thailand) Noppawan Lertcheewakarn (Thailand) Varatchaya Wongteanchai	6–4, 1–6, [8–10]
Win	1.	Jun 2013	Niš, Serbia	Clay	(Bulgaria) Viktoriya Tomova	(Bosnia and Herzegovina) Nerma Čaluk (Slovenia) Tjaša Šrimpf	6–1, 6–2
Win	2.	Jun 2013	Prokuplje, Serbia	Clay	(Bulgaria) Viktoriya Tomova	(Croatia) Ema Mikulčić (Germany) Dejana Raickovic	6–2, 7–5
Loss	3.	Jul 2013	Prokuplje, Serbia	Clay	(Bulgaria) Viktoriya Tomova	(North Macedonia) Lina Gjorcheska (Bulgaria) Dalia Zafirova	3–6, 0–6

== Grand Slam doubles performance timeline ==
Key
W	F	SF	QF	#R	RR	Q#	DNQ	A	NH

(W) winner; (F) finalist; (SF) semifinalist; (QF) quarterfinalist; (#R) rounds 4, 3, 2, 1; (RR) round-robin stage; (Q#) qualification round; (DNQ) did not qualify; (A) absent; (NH) not held; (SR) strike rate (events won / competed); (W–L) win–loss record.

Tournament	2011	2012	2013	W–L
Australian Open	1R	1R	1R	0–3
French Open	A	A	A	0–0
Wimbledon	A	A	A	0–0
US Open	A	A	A	0–0
Win–loss	0–1	0–1	0–1	0–3
