= 2010 Medibank International Sydney – Women's doubles =

Women's doubles
- 2010 Medibank International Sydney

Final
- Champions: (Zimbabwe) Cara Black (United States) Liezel Huber
- Runners-up: (Italy) Tathiana Garbin (Russia) Nadia Petrova
- Score: 6–1, 3–6, 10–3

Events
Singles	men	women
Doubles	men	women
← 2009 ·	Sydney International	· 2011 →

Hsieh Su-wei and Peng Shuai were the defending champions, but chose not to compete.

Cara Black and Liezel Huber won in the final, 6–1, 3–6, 10–3, against Tathiana Garbin and Nadia Petrova.

== Seeds ==
1. (Zimbabwe) Cara Black / (United States) Liezel Huber (champions)
2. (United States) Lisa Raymond / (Australia) Rennae Stubbs (first round)
3. (Russia) Alisa Kleybanova / (Italy) Francesca Schiavone (second round)
4. (Germany) Anna-Lena Grönefeld / (United States) Vania King (semifinals)

== Main draw ==
=== Key ===
- Q = Qualifier
- WC = Wild card
- LL = Lucky loser
- Alt = Alternate
- SE = Special exempt
- PR = Protected ranking
- ITF = ITF entry
- JE = Junior exempt
- w/o = Walkover
- r = Retired
- d = Defaulted
- SR = Special ranking

=== Draw ===
First round
1	(Zimbabwe) C Black (United States) L Huber	6	6
WC	(Russia) M Kirilenko (Russia) D Safina	2	3
(United Kingdom) S Borwell (United States) R Kops-Jones	6	3	[2]
(Russia) V Dushevina (Australia) A Rodionova	4	6	[10]
3	(Russia) A Kleybanova (Italy) F Schiavone	6	2	[10]
(Italy) F Pennetta (Czech Republic) B Záhlavová-Strýcová	4	6	[7]
(Russia) E Vesnina (Kazakhstan) G Voskoboeva	3	2
(United States) L Granville (United States) A Spears	6	6
(Uzbekistan) A Amanmuradova (France) J Coin	6	6
(Poland) K Jans (Poland) A Rosolska	3	4
(Czech Republic) V Uhlířová (Czech Republic) R Voráčová	5	4
4	(Germany) A-L Grönefeld (United States) V King	7	6
(Italy) T Garbin (Russia) N Petrova	7	7
(Spain) MJ Martínez Sánchez (Spain) A Parra Santonja	5	5
(Australia) C Dellacqua (France) A Rezaï	7	4	[10]
2	(United States) L Raymond (Australia) R Stubbs	5	6	[6]

Quarterfinals
1	(Zimbabwe) C Black (United States) L Huber	6	4	[10]
(Russia) V Dushevina (Australia) A Rodionova	3	6	[8]
3	(Russia) A Kleybanova (Italy) F Schiavone	3	2
(United States) L Granville (United States) A Spears	6	6
(Uzbekistan) A Amanmuradova (France) J Coin	4	2
4	(Germany) A-L Grönefeld (United States) V King	6	6
(Italy) T Garbin (Russia) N Petrova	6	6
(Australia) C Dellacqua (France) A Rezaï	1	4

Semifinals
1	(Zimbabwe) C Black (United States) L Huber	6	6
(United States) L Granville (United States) A Spears	1	1
4	(Germany) A-L Grönefeld (United States) V King	3	5
(Italy) T Garbin (Russia) N Petrova	6	7

Final
1	(Zimbabwe) C Black (United States) L Huber	6	3	[10]
(Italy) T Garbin (Russia) N Petrova	1	6	[3]
