= 2010 Medibank International Sydney – Men's singles =

Men's singles
- 2010 Medibank International Sydney

Final
- Champion: (Cyprus) Marcos Baghdatis
- Runner-up: (France) Richard Gasquet
- Score: 6–4, 7–6^{(7–2)}

Details
- Draw: 28
- Seeds: 8

Events
Singles	men	women
Doubles	men	women
- Sydney International

David Nalbandian was the defending champion, but chose not to participate this year.

In the final, Marcos Baghdatis defeated Richard Gasquet, 6–4, 7–6^{(7–2)}.

== Seeds ==
The top four seeds receive a bye to the second round.

1. (France) Gaël Monfils (withdrew due to a shoulder injury)
2. (Czech Republic) Tomáš Berdych (second round)
3. (Switzerland) Stanislas Wawrinka (withdrew due to a neck injury)
4. (Australia) Lleyton Hewitt (quarterfinals)
5. (United States) Sam Querrey (first round)
6. (Serbia) Viktor Troicki (second round)
7. (Russia) Igor Andreev (first round)
8. (Germany) Benjamin Becker (second round)

== Draw ==
Key

- Q = Qualifier
- WC = Wild card
- LL = Lucky loser
- Alt = Alternate
- ITF = ITF entry
- PR = Protected ranking
- SR = Special ranking
- SE = Special exempt
- JE = Junior exempt
- JR = Junior Accelerator Programme entrant
- CO = College Accelerator Programme entrant
- NG = Next Gen Accelerator Program entrant
- w/o = Walkover
- r = Retired
- d = Defaulted

=== Finals ===
Semifinals
(France) Richard Gasquet	6	7
(France) Julien Benneteau	4	5
(Cyprus) Marcos Baghdatis	6	6^{7}	7
(United States) Mardy Fish	4	7	6^{5}

Final
(France) Richard Gasquet	4	6^{2}
(Cyprus) Marcos Baghdatis	6	7

=== Top half ===
First round
(Italy) P Starace	6	6
Q	(Portugal) F Gil	1	4
(Spain) F López	1	4
(France) R Gasquet	6	6
Q	(Argentina) JI Chela	3	3
8	(Germany) B Becker	6	6
(France) J Benneteau	6	6
(Israel) D Sela	3	1
(France) M Llodra	2	6^{1}
(Uruguay) P Cuevas	6	7
Q	(Argentina) L Mayer	6^{7}	6	7
7	(Russia) I Andreev	7	3	6^{4}

Second round
LL	(Spain) D Gimeno Traver	3	2	r
(Italy) P Starace	6	3
(France) R Gasquet	6	7
8	(Germany) B Becker	2	6^{4}
LL	(United States) T Dent	3	7	6^{2}
(France) J Benneteau	6	5	7
(Uruguay) P Cuevas	4	2
Q	(Argentina) L Mayer	6	6

Quarterfinals
(Italy) P Starace	3	6^{7}
(France) R Gasquet	6	7
(France) J Benneteau	6	6^{5}	6
Q	(Argentina) L Mayer	4	7	0

Semifinals
(France) R Gasquet	6	7
(France) J Benneteau	4	5

=== Bottom half ===
First round
6	(Serbia) V Troicki	7	6
(France) F Serra	6^{5}	4
WC	(Australia) N Lindahl	2	5
(Cyprus) M Baghdatis	6	7
Q	(Australia) M Matosevic	4	4
(Italy) A Seppi	6	6
5	(United States) S Querrey	2	7	4
(Kazakhstan) E Korolev	6	5	6
WC	(Australia) C Ball	4	6^{4}
(United States) M Fish	6	7
WC	(Australia) P Luczak	7	6
(Argentina) J Acasuso	6^{1}	4

Second round
6	(Serbia) V Troicki	5	3
(Cyprus) M Baghdatis	7	6
(Italy) A Seppi	0	2
4	(Australia) L Hewitt	6	6
(Kazakhstan) E Korolev	1	2
(United States) M Fish	6	6
WC	(Australia) P Luczak	1	6	6
2	(Czech Republic) T Berdych	6	4	2

Quarterfinals
(Cyprus) M Baghdatis	4	6	6
4	(Australia) L Hewitt	6	2	3
(United States) M Fish	7	6
WC	(Australia) P Luczak	6^{5}	2

Semifinals
(Cyprus) M Baghdatis	6	6^{7}	7
(United States) M Fish	4	7	6^{5}

== Qualifying draw ==
=== Seeds ===
1. (France) ~~Arnaud Clément~~ (withdrew)
2. (France) ~~Florent Serra~~ (moved into main draw)
3. (France) ~~Michaël Llodra~~ (moved into main draw)
4. (Portugal) Fred Gil (qualified)
5. (Spain) Daniel Gimeno Traver (qualifying competition, lucky loser)
6. (Argentina) Juan Ignacio Chela (qualified)
7. (Argentina) Leonardo Mayer (qualified)
8. (United States) Taylor Dent (qualifying competition, lucky loser)

=== Qualifiers ===
1. (Argentina) Juan Ignacio Chela
2. (Australia) Marinko Matosevic
3. (Argentina) Leonardo Mayer
4. (Portugal) Fred Gil

=== Lucky loser ===
1. (Spain) Daniel Gimeno Traver
2. (United States) Taylor Dent

=== First qualifier ===
First round
Alt	(Ukraine) Ivan Sergeyev	3	2
(Spain) Albert Ramos Viñolas	6	6
(Slovakia) Karol Beck	6	2	1
(United States) Ryan Sweeting	2	6	6
(Argentina) Martín Vassallo Argüello	6	6
(United States) Robert Kendrick	3	4
(Colombia) Alejandro Falla	6	4	3
6	(Argentina) Juan Ignacio Chela	2	6	6

Second round
(Spain) Albert Ramos Viñolas	4	0
(United States) Ryan Sweeting	6	6
(Argentina) Martín Vassallo Argüello	5	6^{4}
6	(Argentina) Juan Ignacio Chela	7	7^{7}

Qualifying competition
(United States) Ryan Sweeting	6	4	4
(Argentina) Juan Ignacio Chela	3	6	6

=== Second qualifier ===
First round
Alt	(Ukraine) Sergei Bubka	6	1	6
Alt	(Monaco) Benjamin Balleret	3	6	4
(Australia) Marinko Matosevic	6	6
WC	(Australia) James Duckworth	1	3
Alt	(Austria) Philipp Oswald	6	6
(Germany) Mischa Zverev	3	4
(South Korea) Im Kyu-tae	1	6^{8}
5	(Spain) Daniel Gimeno Traver	6	7^{10}

Second round
Alt	(Ukraine) Sergei Bubka	4	4
(Australia) Marinko Matosevic	6	6
Alt	(Austria) Philipp Oswald	7^{7}	5	2
5	(Spain) Daniel Gimeno Traver	6^{2}	7	6

Qualifying competition
(Australia) Marinko Matosevic	6	6
5	(Spain) Daniel Gimeno Traver	1	4

=== Third qualifier ===
First round
Alt	(United Kingdom) Brydan Klein	6	4	5
(Russia) Alex Bogomolov Jr.	3	6	7
(Belgium) Christophe Rochus	3	7	6^{4}
(Austria) Martin Fischer	6	5	7^{7}
WC	(Australia) Jason Kubler	4	6	3
(United States) Rajeev Ram	6	3	6
(Argentina) Federico Delbonis	6^{3}	3
7	(Argentina) Leonardo Mayer	7^{7}	6

Second round
(Russia) Alex Bogomolov Jr.	6	6
(Austria) Martin Fischer	3	3
(United States) Rajeev Ram	1	2
7	(Argentina) Leonardo Mayer	6	6

Qualifying competition
(Russia) Alex Bogomolov Jr.	6^{7}	6	3
7	(Argentina) Leonardo Mayer	7^{9}	2	6

=== Fourth qualifier ===
First round
4	(Portugal) Fred Gil	6	6
(France) Sébastien de Chaunac	4	2
WC	(Australia) Matthew Ebden	6	5	3
(Germany) Julian Reister	4	7	6
(France) Guillaume Rufin	2	7^{9}	3
(Finland) Jarkko Nieminen	6	6^{7}	6
WC	(Australia) Greg Jones	6^{3}	3
8	(United States) Taylor Dent	7^{7}	6

Second round
4	(Portugal) Fred Gil	7^{8}	6
(Germany) Julian Reister	6^{6}	1
(Finland) Jarkko Nieminen	6	3	2
8	(United States) Taylor Dent	4	6	6

Qualifying competition
4	(Portugal) Fred Gil	6	6
8	(United States) Taylor Dent	3	3
