= 2012 Apia International Sydney – Men's singles =

Men's singles
- 2012 Apia International Sydney

Final
- Champion: (Finland) Jarkko Nieminen
- Runner-up: (France) Julien Benneteau
- Score: 6–2, 7–5

Details
- Draw: 8
- Seeds: 8

Events
Singles	men	women
Doubles	men	women
- Sydney International

Gilles Simon was the defending champion, but chose not to participate. Jarkko Nieminen won in the final against Julien Benneteau 6–2, 7–5.

== Seeds ==
The top four seeds received a bye into the second round.

1. (Argentina) Juan Martín del Potro (quarterfinals)
2. (United States) John Isner (second round)
3. (France) Richard Gasquet (quarterfinals)
4. (Spain) Feliciano López (second round)
5. (Serbia) Viktor Troicki (second round)
6. (Germany) Florian Mayer (withdrew due to a right hip injury)
7. (Spain) Marcel Granollers (first round)
8. (Czech Republic) Radek Štěpánek (second round)

== Draw ==
Key

- Q = Qualifier
- WC = Wild card
- LL = Lucky loser
- Alt = Alternate
- ITF = ITF entry
- PR = Protected ranking
- SR = Special ranking
- SE = Special exempt
- JE = Junior exempt
- JR = Junior Accelerator Programme entrant
- CO = College Accelerator Programme entrant
- NG = Next Gen Accelerator Program entrant
- w/o = Walkover
- r = Retired
- d = Defaulted

=== Finals ===
Semifinals
(Cyprus) Marcos Baghdatis	4	4
(France) Julien Benneteau	6	6
Q	(Uzbekistan) Denis Istomin	6^{12}	3
Q	(Finland) Jarkko Nieminen	7^{14}	6

Final
(France) Julien Benneteau	2	5
Q	(Finland) Jarkko Nieminen	6	7

=== Top half ===
First round
(Croatia) I Dodig	6^{4}	5
(Poland) Ł Kubot	7^{7}	7
(Russia) D Tursunov	4	4
(Cyprus) M Baghdatis	6	6
WC	(Australia) M Ebden	6	3	6
7	(Spain) M Granollers	1	6	3
(Italy) A Seppi	3	4
(France) J Benneteau	6	6
(Russia) A Bogomolov Jr.	6	1	6
(Netherlands) R Haase	4	6	4
WC	(Australia) L Hewitt	6	3	2
5	(Serbia) V Troicki	4	6	6

Second round
1	(Argentina) JM del Potro	6	6
(Poland) Ł Kubot	4	2
(Cyprus) M Baghdatis	3	7	7^{7}
WC	(Australia) M Ebden	6	5	6^{3}
4	(Spain) F López	3	4
(France) J Benneteau	6	6
(Russia) A Bogomolov Jr.	7^{7}	6
5	(Serbia) V Troicki	6^{5}	4

Quarterfinals
1	(Argentina) JM del Potro	6^{7}	4
(Cyprus) M Baghdatis	7^{9}	6
(France) J Benneteau	6	6
(Russia) A Bogomolov Jr.	2	4

Semifinals
(Cyprus) M Baghdatis	4	4
(France) J Benneteau	6	6

=== Bottom half ===
First round
LL	(United States) R Sweeting	3	7^{7}	7
(Luxembourg) G Müller	6	6^{2}	5
(Spain) P Andújar	3	6	3
Q	(Uzbekistan) D Istomin	6	2	6
Q	(United States) M Russell	6	2	0
(Italy) F Fognini	2	6	6
8	(Czech Republic) R Štěpánek	6^{4}	6	6
(Belgium) X Malisse	7^{7}	4	4
Q	(Finland) J Nieminen	6	6
WC	(Australia) J Duckworth	2	2
(Ukraine) S Stakhovsky	5	3
Q	(United States) B Reynolds	7	6

Second round
LL	(United States) R Sweeting	2	1
Q	(Uzbekistan) D Istomin	6	6
(Italy) F Fognini	2	1
3	(France) R Gasquet	6	6
8	(Czech Republic) R Štěpánek	6^{5}	7	1
Q	(Finland) J Nieminen	7^{7}	5	6
Q	(United States) B Reynolds	3	6	6
2	(United States) J Isner	6	4	3

Quarterfinals
Q	(Uzbekistan) D Istomin	6	7^{7}
3	(France) R Gasquet	4	6^{4}
Q	(Finland) J Nieminen	6	6
Q	(United States) B Reynolds	3	3

Semifinals
Q	(Uzbekistan) D Istomin	6^{12}	3
Q	(Finland) J Nieminen	7^{14}	6

== Qualifying draw ==
=== Seeds ===
1. (Poland) ~~Łukasz Kubot~~ (moved into main draw)
2. (Ukraine) ~~Sergiy Stakhovsky~~ (moved into main draw)
3. (United States) Ryan Sweeting (qualifying competition, lucky loser)
4. (Uzbekistan) Denis Istomin (qualified)
5. (Bulgaria) Grigor Dimitrov (second round, retired due to fatigue)
6. (Finland) Jarkko Nieminen (qualified)
7. (Argentina) Leonardo Mayer (first round)
8. (France) Nicolas Mahut (first round)

=== Qualifiers ===
1. (United States) Bobby Reynolds
2. (Finland) Jarkko Nieminen
3. (United States) Michael Russell
4. (Uzbekistan) Denis Istomin

=== Lucky loser ===
1. (United States) Ryan Sweeting

=== First qualifier ===
First round
Alt	(Sweden) Andreas Siljeström	3	0
(United States) Alex Kuznetsov	6	6
(United States) Bobby Reynolds	6	6
(Germany) Cedrik-Marcel Stebe	4	3
(Australia) Marinko Matosevic	6	6^{5}	2
(Kazakhstan) Mikhail Kukushkin	1	7	6
(Australia) Benjamin Mitchell	6	6
7	(Argentina) Leonardo Mayer	4	3

Second round
(United States) Alex Kuznetsov	4	1
(United States) Bobby Reynolds	6	6
(Kazakhstan) Mikhail Kukushkin	3	1
(Australia) Benjamin Mitchell	6	6

Qualifying competition
(United States) Bobby Reynolds	4	6	6
(Australia) Benjamin Mitchell	6	4	3

=== Second qualifier ===
First round
Alt	(Australia) Sadik Kadir	4	4
(Portugal) Frederico Gil	6	6
(France) Stéphane Robert	6	6^{4}	6
WC	(Australia) Matthew Barton	2	7^{7}	3
(Germany) Andre Begemann	6	6
(Australia) Luke Saville	4	4
(Bosnia and Herzegovina) Amer Delić	1	0^{r}
6	(Finland) Jarkko Nieminen	6	1

Second round
(Portugal) Frederico Gil	4	1
(France) Stéphane Robert	6	6
(Germany) Andre Begemann	2	3
6	(Finland) Jarkko Nieminen	6	6

Qualifying competition
(France) Stéphane Robert	2	2
6	(Finland) Jarkko Nieminen	6	6

=== Third qualifier ===
First round
3	(United States) Ryan Sweeting	6	7
(Brazil) João Souza	1	5
(Australia) Greg Jones	7	6
(Germany) Daniel Brands	5	3
(United States) Michael Russell	7^{7}	6
(Germany) Simon Greul	6^{2}	1
(Romania) Victor Hănescu	6	7
8	(France) Nicolas Mahut	4	5

Second round
3	(United States) Ryan Sweeting	6	7
(Australia) Greg Jones	2	5
(United States) Michael Russell	6	5	6
(Romania) Victor Hănescu	2	7	4

Qualifying competition
3	(United States) Ryan Sweeting	6	3	4
(United States) Michael Russell	4	6	6

=== Fourth qualifier ===
First round
4	(Uzbekistan) Denis Istomin	7	7^{7}
WC	(Australia) Matt Reid	5	6^{5}
(Moldova) Roman Borvanov	6	4	1
(Czech Republic) Jan Hájek	4	6	6
WC	(Australia) Adam Feeney	6	1	6
(Slovakia) Karol Beck	2	6	4
(Estonia) Jürgen Zopp	1	7^{8}	2
5	(Bulgaria) Grigor Dimitrov	6	6^{6}	6

Second round
4	(Uzbekistan) Denis Istomin	6	6
(Czech Republic) Jan Hájek	1	2
WC	(Australia) Adam Feeney	3
5	(Bulgaria) Grigor Dimitrov	0^{r}

Qualifying competition
4	(Uzbekistan) Denis Istomin	6	7^{7}
WC	(Australia) Adam Feeney	3	6^{0}
