= 2012 Mercury Insurance Open – Singles =

Singles
- 2012 Mercury Insurance Open

Final
- Champion: (Slovakia) Dominika Cibulková
- Runner-up: (France) Marion Bartoli
- Score: 6–1, 7–5

Details
- Draw: 28
- Seeds: 8

Events
Singles	Doubles
- San Diego Open

Agnieszka Radwańska was the defending champion but chose not to compete.
Dominika Cibulková defeated her close friend Marion Bartoli 6–1, 7–5 in the final to win the tournament.

== Seeds ==
The top four seeds receive a bye into the second round.

1. (France) Marion Bartoli (final)
2. (Slovakia) Dominika Cibulková (champion)
3. (Serbia) Jelena Janković (quarterfinals)
4. (Russia) Nadia Petrova (semifinals)
5. (United States) Christina McHale (quarterfinals)
6. (Slovakia) Daniela Hantuchová (first round)
7. (Belgium) Yanina Wickmayer (first round, retired because of a lower back injury)
8. (South Africa) Chanelle Scheepers (second round)

== Draw ==
Key

- Q = Qualifier
- WC = Wild card
- LL = Lucky loser
- Alt = Alternate
- ITF = ITF entry
- PR = Protected ranking
- SR = Special ranking
- SE = Special exempt
- JE = Junior exempt
- JR = Junior Accelerator Programme entrant
- CO = College Accelerator Programme entrant
- NG = Next Gen Accelerator Program entrant
- w/o = Walkover
- r = Retired
- d = Defaulted

=== Finals ===
Semifinals
1	(France) Marion Bartoli	1	6	6
Q	(Chinese Taipei) Chan Yung-jan	6	3	3
4	(Russia) Nadia Petrova	6^{8}	1
2	(Slovakia) Dominika Cibulková	7^{10}	6

Final
1	(France) Marion Bartoli	1	5
2	(Slovakia) Dominika Cibulková	6	7

=== Top half ===
First round
(Chinese Taipei) K-c Chang	1	4
(United States) V King	6	6
Q	(Portugal) M Larcher de Brito	7^{8}	1	3
(Japan) M Doi	6^{6}	6	6
(Australia) J Gajdošová	6^{5}	5
5	(United States) C McHale	7^{7}	7
Q	(Kazakhstan) S Karatantcheva	2	6	5
(Hungary) M Czink	6	4	7
(Greece) E Daniilidou	3	3
(United Kingdom) H Watson	6	6
Q	(Chinese Taipei) Y-j Chan	7^{8}
7	(Belgium) Y Wickmayer	6^{6}	r

Second round
1	(France) M Bartoli	6	5	6
(United States) V King	4	7	4
(Japan) M Doi	6	4	4
5	(United States) C McHale	4	6	6
3	(Serbia) J Janković	2	6	6
(Hungary) M Czink	6	4	4
(United Kingdom) H Watson	3	6^{2}
Q	(Chinese Taipei) Y-j Chan	6	7^{7}

Quarterfinals
1	(France) M Bartoli	7	4	6
5	(United States) C McHale	5	6	4
3	(Serbia) J Janković	7^{7}	6^{8}	5
Q	(Chinese Taipei) Y-j Chan	6^{4}	7^{10}	7

Semifinals
1	(France) M Bartoli	1	6	6
Q	(Chinese Taipei) Y-j Chan	6	3	3

=== Bottom half ===
First round
8	(South Africa) C Scheepers	6	7^{7}
WC	(United States) C Vandeweghe	2	6^{4}
(United States) V Lepchenko	6	6
WC	(United States) N Gibbs	3	1
WC	(United States) L Davis	3	2
Q	(United States) A Glatch	6	6
6/WC	(Slovakia) D Hantuchová	4	5
(Poland) U Radwańska	6	7
LL	(United States) M Oudin	1	7^{8}	6
(United States) S Stephens	6	6^{6}	0
(New Zealand) M Erakovic	6	6
(United Kingdom) A Keothavong	4	0

Second round
8	(South Africa) C Scheepers	4	2
(United States) V Lepchenko	6	6
Q	(United States) A Glatch	4	3
4	(Russia) N Petrova	6	6
(Poland) U Radwańska	6	6
LL	(United States) M Oudin	2	1
(New Zealand) M Erakovic	2	4
2	(Slovakia) D Cibulková	6	6

Quarterfinals
(United States) V Lepchenko	4	6	6^{5}
4	(Russia) N Petrova	6	2	7^{7}
(Poland) U Radwańska	4	4
2	(Slovakia) D Cibulková	6	6

Semifinals
4	(Russia) N Petrova	6^{8}	1
2	(Slovakia) D Cibulková	7^{10}	6

== Qualifying ==
=== Seeds ===
1. (Italy) Camila Giorgi (first round)
2. (Kazakhstan) Sesil Karatantcheva (qualified)
3. (United States) Melanie Oudin (qualifying competition, lucky loser)
4. (Japan) Erika Sema (first round)
5. (Portugal) Michelle Larcher de Brito (qualified)
6. (France) Irena Pavlovic (qualifying competition)
7. (United States) Alexa Glatch (qualified)
8. (United States) Madison Brengle (qualifying competition)

=== Qualifiers ===
1. (United States) Alexa Glatch
2. (Kazakhstan) Sesil Karatantcheva
3. (Portugal) Michelle Larcher de Brito
4. (Chinese Taipei) Chan Yung-jan

=== Lucky loser ===
1. (United States) Melanie Oudin

=== Draw ===
==== First qualifier ====
First round
1	(Italy) Camila Giorgi	4	1
(Thailand) Noppawan Lertcheewakarn	6	6
(Canada) Heidi El Tabakh	1	3
7	(United States) Alexa Glatch	6	6

Qualifying competition
(Thailand) Noppawan Lertcheewakarn	5	1
7	(United States) Alexa Glatch	7	6

==== Second qualifier ====
First round
2	(Kazakhstan) Sesil Karatantcheva	6	0	6
(United States) Grace Min	0	6	2
WC	(United States) Zoë Gwen Scandalis	2	4
8	(United States) Madison Brengle	6	6

Qualifying competition
2	(Kazakhstan) Sesil Karatantcheva	7	7
8	(United States) Madison Brengle	5	5

==== Third qualifier ====
First round
3	(United States) Melanie Oudin	7^{7}	6
(United States) Jessica Pegula	6^{2}	2
(United States) Julia Boserup	3	2
5	(Portugal) Michelle Larcher de Brito	6	6

Qualifying competition
3	(United States) Melanie Oudin	4	2
5	(Portugal) Michelle Larcher de Brito	6	6

==== Fourth qualifier ====
First round
4	(Japan) Erika Sema	4	6	5
(Chinese Taipei) Chan Yung-jan	6	4	7
WC	(Slovenia) Jelena Durišič	4	0
6	(France) Irena Pavlovic	6	6

Qualifying competition
(Chinese Taipei) Chan Yung-jan	6	6
6	(France) Irena Pavlovic	3	4
