= 2011 Medibank International Sydney – Men's doubles =

Men's doubles
- 2011 Medibank International Sydney

Final
- Champions: (Czech Republic) Lukáš Dlouhý (Australia) Paul Hanley
- Runners-up: (United States) Bob Bryan (United States) Mike Bryan
- Score: 6–7^{(6–8)}, 6–3, [10–5]

Events
Singles	men	women
Doubles	men	women
← 2010 ·	Sydney International	· 2012 →

Daniel Nestor and Nenad Zimonjić were the defending champions after defeating Ross Hutchins and Jordan Kerr in the 2010 final. However, they chose to not defend the title as a team as the split at the end of the 2010 season. Nestor tried to defend his title with new partner Max Mirnyi, but they lost to Julien Benneteau and Richard Gasquet in the first round.
Unseeded Lukáš Dlouhý and Paul Hanley won this tournament. Their triumph in the final was surprising, because they defeated 1st seeds Bob and Mike Bryan 6–7^{(6–8)}, 6–3, [10–5].

== Seeds ==
1. (United States) Bob Bryan / (United States) Mike Bryan (final)
2. (Belarus) Max Mirnyi / (Canada) Daniel Nestor (first round)
3. (Poland) Łukasz Kubot / (Austria) Oliver Marach (quarterfinals)
4. (Poland) Mariusz Fyrstenberg / (Poland) Marcin Matkowski (first round)

== Draw ==
=== Key ===
- Q = Qualifier
- WC = Wild card
- LL = Lucky loser
- Alt = Alternate
- SE = Special exempt
- PR = Protected ranking
- ITF = ITF entry
- JE = Junior exempt
- w/o = Walkover
- r = Retired
- d = Defaulted
- SR = Special ranking

=== Draw ===
First round
1	(United States) B Bryan (United States) M Bryan	6	6
(Belgium) D Norman (Slovakia) F Polášek	4	4
(France) J Chardy (France) G Simon	6	3	[6]
(The Bahamas) M Knowles (Slovakia) M Mertiňák	4	6	[10]
4	(Poland) M Fyrstenberg (Poland) M Matkowski	4	4
(Argentina) JI Chela (Spain) G García-López	6	6
(Russia) I Andreev (Russia) D Tursunov	7	6
(Israel) J Erlich (Israel) A Ram	5	0
(Czech Republic) L Dlouhý (Australia) P Hanley	6	6
(Uzbekistan) D Istomin (Argentina) E Schwank	4	2
WC	(Australia) M Ebden (Australia) P Luczak	5	4
3	(Poland) Ł Kubot (Austria) O Marach	7	6
(India) R Bopanna (Pakistan) A-u-H Qureshi	6	6
WC	(Australia) C Ball (Australia) M Matosevic	2	3
(France) J Benneteau (France) R Gasquet	1	7	[10]
2	(Belarus) M Mirnyi (Canada) D Nestor	6	6^{9}	[6]

Quarterfinals
1	(United States) B Bryan (United States) M Bryan	6	6
(The Bahamas) M Knowles (Slovakia) M Mertiňák	3	2
(Argentina) JI Chela (Spain) G García-López	6	6
(Russia) I Andreev (Russia) D Tursunov	4	3
(Czech Republic) L Dlouhý (Australia) P Hanley	3	6	[11]
3	(Poland) Ł Kubot (Austria) O Marach	6	2	[9]
(India) R Bopanna (Pakistan) A-u-H Qureshi	w/o
(France) J Benneteau (France) R Gasquet

Semifinals
1	(United States) B Bryan (United States) M Bryan	6	6
(Argentina) JI Chela (Spain) G García-López	3	3
(Czech Republic) L Dlouhý (Australia) P Hanley	7	4	[10]
(India) R Bopanna (Pakistan) A-u-H Qureshi	5	6	[8]

Final
1	(United States) B Bryan (United States) M Bryan	7	3	[5]
(Czech Republic) L Dlouhý (Australia) P Hanley	6^{6}	6	[10]
