= 2011 Medibank International Sydney – Women's doubles =

Women's doubles
- 2011 Medibank International Sydney

Final
- Champions: (Czech Republic) Iveta Benešová (Czech Republic) Barbora Záhlavová-Strýcová
- Runners-up: (Czech Republic) Květa Peschke (Slovenia) Katarina Srebotnik
- Score: 4–6, 6–4, [10–7]

Events
Singles	men	women
Doubles	men	women
← 2010 ·	Sydney International	· 2012 →

Cara Black and Liezel Huber were the defending champions after defeating Tathiana Garbin and Nadia Petrova in the 2010 final. However they did not defend the title together, after splitting halfway through the 2010 season.
Black partnered with Anastasia Rodionova as the fourth seed, but they were eliminated in the first round, by Chuang Chia-jung and Hsieh Su-wei.
Huber played with Petrova as the second seed. They lost to Iveta Benešová and Barbora Záhlavová-Strýcová in the semifinals. This pair reached the final and won this tournament, by defeating 3rd seeds Květa Peschke and Katarina Srebotnik 4–6, 6–4, [10–7].

== Seeds ==
1. (Argentina) Gisela Dulko / (Italy) Flavia Pennetta (first round)
2. (United States) Liezel Huber / (Russia) Nadia Petrova (semifinals)
3. (Czech Republic) Květa Peschke / (Slovenia) Katarina Srebotnik (final)
4. (Zimbabwe) Cara Black / (Australia) Anastasia Rodionova (first round)

== Draw ==
=== Key ===
- Q = Qualifier
- WC = Wild card
- LL = Lucky loser
- Alt = Alternate
- SE = Special exempt
- PR = Protected ranking
- ITF = ITF entry
- JE = Junior exempt
- w/o = Walkover
- r = Retired
- d = Defaulted
- SR = Special ranking

=== Draw ===
First round
1	(Argentina) G Dulko (Italy) F Pennetta	6	4	[7]
(Poland) K Jans (Poland) A Rosolska	3	6	[10]
(Belarus) V Azarenka (Russia) M Kirilenko	6	6
(United States) J Craybas (Australia) R Stubbs	1	2
3	(Czech Republic) K Peschke (Slovenia) K Srebotnik	6	1	[10]
(Switzerland) T Bacsinszky (Czech Republic) R Voráčová	1	6	[7]
(Germany) J Görges (United States) L Raymond	6	6
(Czech Republic) A Hlaváčková (Czech Republic) L Hradecká	1	4
(Czech Republic) I Benešová (Czech Republic) B Záhlavová-Strýcová	6	5	[10]
(Romania) M Niculescu (China) Z Yan	2	7	[3]
(Chinese Taipei) C-j Chuang (Chinese Taipei) S-w Hsieh	5	7	[10]
4	(Zimbabwe) C Black (Australia) A Rodionova	7	5	[7]
(Spain) MJ Martínez Sánchez (Spain) A Medina Garrigues	6	6
(Russia) V Dushevina (United States) V King	3	4
WC	(Australia) T Patterson (Australia) V Rajicic	3	3
2	(United States) L Huber (Russia) N Petrova	6	6

Quarterfinals
(Poland) K Jans (Poland) A Rosolska	w/o
(Belarus) V Azarenka (Russia) M Kirilenko
3	(Czech Republic) K Peschke (Slovenia) K Srebotnik	7	6
(Germany) J Görges (United States) L Raymond	5	2
(Czech Republic) I Benešová (Czech Republic) B Záhlavová-Strýcová	7	1	[10]
(Chinese Taipei) C-j Chuang (Chinese Taipei) S-w Hsieh	6^{8}	6	[5]
(Spain) MJ Martínez Sánchez (Spain) A Medina Garrigues	3	6	[7]
2	(United States) L Huber (Russia) N Petrova	6	1	[10]

Semifinals
(Poland) K Jans (Poland) A Rosolska	3	1
3	(Czech Republic) K Peschke (Slovenia) K Srebotnik	6	6
(Czech Republic) I Benešová (Czech Republic) B Záhlavová-Strýcová	5	7	[10]
2	(United States) L Huber (Russia) N Petrova	7	6^{1}	[6]

Final
3	(Czech Republic) K Peschke (Slovenia) K Srebotnik	6	4	[7]
(Czech Republic) I Benešová (Czech Republic) B Záhlavová-Strýcová	4	6	[10]
