= 2011 Medibank International Sydney – Women's singles =

Women's singles
- 2011 Medibank International Sydney

Final
- Champion: (China) Li Na
- Runner-up: (Belgium) Kim Clijsters
- Score: 7–6^{(7–3)}, 6–3

Details
- Draw: 30
- Seeds: 8

Events
Singles	men	women
Doubles	men	women
- Sydney International

Elena Dementieva was the defending champion, but retired from the sport at the end of the 2010 season.

Li Na won the title, defeating Kim Clijsters in the final 7–6^{(7–3)}, 6–3.

== Seeds ==
The top two seeds receive a bye to the second round.

1. (Denmark) Caroline Wozniacki (second round)
2. (Russia) Vera Zvonareva (second round)
3. (Belgium) Kim Clijsters (final)
4. (Australia) Samantha Stosur (second round)
5. (Italy) Francesca Schiavone (first round)
6. (Serbia) Jelena Janković (first round)
7. (Belarus) Victoria Azarenka (quarterfinals)
8. (China) Li Na (champion)

== Draw ==
Key

- Q = Qualifier
- WC = Wild card
- LL = Lucky loser
- Alt = Alternate
- ITF = ITF entry
- PR = Protected ranking
- SR = Special ranking
- SE = Special exempt
- JE = Junior exempt
- JR = Junior Accelerator Programme entrant
- CO = College Accelerator Programme entrant
- NG = Next Gen Accelerator Program entrant
- w/o = Walkover
- r = Retired
- d = Defaulted

=== Finals ===
Semifinals
(Russia) Alisa Kleybanova	6	3	6^{1}
3	(Belgium) Kim Clijsters	4	6	7
8	(China) Li Na	7	6
Q	(Serbia) Bojana Jovanovski	6^{5}	3

Final
3	(Belgium) Kim Clijsters	6^{3}	3
8	(China) Li Na	7	6

=== Top half ===
First round
(Russia) M Kirilenko	3	3
(Slovakia) D Cibulková	6	6
(Spain) MJ Martínez Sánchez	6	6
(Slovakia) D Hantuchová	2	4
(Russia) A Kleybanova	6^{5}	6	6
5	(Italy) F Schiavone	7	1	2
3	(Belgium) K Clijsters	6	6
(Romania) A Dulgheru	1	2
Q	(Czech Republic) B Záhlavová-Strýcová	6	6
(Russia) N Petrova	2	2
LL	(Austria) S Bammer	3	7	1
(Israel) S Pe'er	6	5	6
Q	(Russia) E Makarova	6	2	4
7	(Belarus) V Azarenka	2	6	6

Second round
1	(Denmark) C Wozniacki	3	3
(Slovakia) D Cibulková	6	6
(Spain) MJ Martínez Sánchez	2	4
(Russia) A Kleybanova	6	6
3	(Belgium) K Clijsters	6	6
Q	(Czech Republic) B Záhlavová-Strýcová	1	4
(Israel) S Pe'er	5	3
7	(Belarus) V Azarenka	7	6

Quarterfinals
(Slovakia) D Cibulková	3	7	2
(Russia) A Kleybanova	6	5	6
3	(Belgium) K Clijsters	6	6
7	(Belarus) V Azarenka	3	2

Semifinals
(Russia) A Kleybanova	6	3	6^{1}
3	(Belgium) K Clijsters	4	6	7

=== Bottom half ===
First round
8	(China) N Li	6	6
WC	(Australia) A Rodionova	1	2
Q	(Czech Republic) S Záhlavová	6^{4}	2
Q	(France) V Razzano	7	6
(Russia) S Kuznetsova	6	6
WC	(Australia) J Dokić	2	2
(Belgium) Y Wickmayer	5	4
4	(Australia) S Stosur	7	6
6	(Serbia) J Janković	5	6	3
(France) A Rezaï	7	2	6
(Estonia) K Kanepi	4	4
Q	(Serbia) B Jovanovski	6	6
(Italy) F Pennetta	6	6
Q	(Czech Republic) L Hradecká	4	3

Second round
8	(China) N Li	6	1	6
Q	(France) V Razzano	4	6	4
(Russia) S Kuznetsova	3	6	6
4	(Australia) S Stosur	6	3	4
(France) A Rezaï	6^{4}	6^{4}
Q	(Serbia) B Jovanovski	7	7
(Italy) F Pennetta	7	7
2	(Russia) V Zvonareva	5	5

Quarterfinals
8	(China) N Li	3	7	6
(Russia) S Kuznetsova	6	6^{4}	3
Q	(Serbia) B Jovanovski	6	6
(Italy) F Pennetta	4	1

Semifinals
8	(China) N Li	7	6
Q	(Serbia) B Jovanovski	6^{5}	3
