= 2011 Medibank International Sydney =

- Date: 9–15 January 2011
- Edition: 119th

Champions

Men's singles
- (France) Gilles Simon

Women's singles
- (China) Li Na

Men's doubles
- (Czech Republic) Lukáš Dlouhý / (Australia) Paul Hanley

Women's doubles
- (Czech Republic) Iveta Benešová / (Czech Republic) Barbora Záhlavová-Strýcová
- Medibank International Sydney

The 2011 Medibank International Sydney was a tennis tournament played on outdoor hard courts. It was the 119th edition of the Medibank International Sydney, and part of the ATP World Tour 250 series of the 2011 ATP World Tour, and of the WTA Premier tournaments of the 2011 WTA Tour. Both the men's and the women's events took place at the NSW Tennis Centre in Sydney, Australia, from 9 to 15 January 2011.

== WTA entrants ==
=== Seeds ===
Country	Player	Rank*	Seed
DEN	Caroline Wozniacki	1	1
RUS	Vera Zvonareva	2	2
BEL	Kim Clijsters	3	3
AUS	Samantha Stosur	6	4
ITA	Francesca Schiavone	7	5
SRB	Jelena Janković	8	6
BLR	Victoria Azarenka	10	7
CHN	Li Na	11	8

* As of 3 January 2011

=== Other entrants ===
The following players received wildcards into the singles main draw:

- (Australia) Jelena Dokić
- (Australia) Anastasia Rodionova

The following players received entry into the singles main draw through qualifying:

- (Czech Republic) Lucie Hradecká
- (Serbia) Bojana Jovanovski
- (Russia) Ekaterina Makarova
- (France) Virginie Razzano
- (Czech Republic) Sandra Záhlavová
- (Czech Republic) Barbora Záhlavová-Strýcová

The following player received entry into the singles main draw via a lucky loser spot:

- (Austria) Sybille Bammer

== ATP entrants ==
=== Seeds ===
Country	Player	Rank*	Seed
USA	Sam Querrey	18	1
CYP	Marcos Baghdatis	20	2
LAT	Ernests Gulbis	24	3
SRB	Viktor Troicki	28	4
FRA	Richard Gasquet	30	5
ESP	Feliciano López	32	6
ESP	Guillermo García López	33	7
TPE	Lu Yen-hsun	35	8

* Rankings are as of 3 January 2011.

=== Other entrants ===
The following players received wildcards into the singles main draw:

- (Argentina) Juan Martín del Potro
- (Australia) Matthew Ebden
- (United Kingdom) James Ward

The following players received entry into the singles main draw through qualifying:

- (Russia) Igor Andreev
- (Portugal) Frederico Gil
- (Australia) Chris Guccione
- (Australia) Bernard Tomic

== Finals ==
=== Men's singles ===
(France) Gilles Simon defeated (Serbia) Viktor Troicki, 7–5, 7–6^{(7–4)}

- It was Simon's first title of the year and 8th of his career.

=== Women's singles ===
(China) Li Na defeated (Belgium) Kim Clijsters, 7–6^{(7–3)}, 6–3

- It was Li's 1st title of the year and 4th of her career.

=== Men's doubles ===
(Czech Republic) Lukáš Dlouhý / (Australia) Paul Hanley defeated (United States) Bob Bryan / (United States) Mike Bryan, 6–7^{(6–8)}, 6–3, [10–5]

=== Women's doubles ===
(Czech Republic) Iveta Benešová / (Czech Republic) Barbora Záhlavová-Strýcová defeated (Czech Republic) Květa Peschke / (Slovenia) Katarina Srebotnik, 4–6, 6–4, [10–7].
