= 2010 Medibank International Sydney =

- Date: 10–16 January 2010
- Edition: 118th
- Category: ATP World Tour 250; WTA Premier
- Location: Sydney, Australia
- Venue: NSW Tennis Centre

Champions

Men's singles
- (Cyprus) Marcos Baghdatis

Women's singles
- (Russia) Elena Dementieva

Men's doubles
- (Canada) Daniel Nestor / (Serbia) Nenad Zimonjić

Women's doubles
- (Zimbabwe) Cara Black / (United States) Liezel Huber
- Sydney International

The 2010 Medibank International Sydney was a tennis tournament played on outdoor hard courts. It was the 118th edition of the event known that year as the Medibank International Sydney, and was part of the ATP World Tour 250 series of the 2010 ATP World Tour, and of the WTA Premier tournaments of the 2010 WTA Tour. Both the men's and the women's events took place at the NSW Tennis Centre in Sydney, Australia, from 10 through 16 January 2010.

Coverage of the event was on Channel Seven, with live coverage of the day sessions and delayed coverage of the night sessions.

== Finals ==
=== Men's singles ===
(Cyprus) Marcos Baghdatis defeated (France) Richard Gasquet, 6–4, 7–6^{(7–2)}

- It was Baghdatis' only singles title of the year and the fourth and last of his career.

=== Women's singles ===
(Russia) Elena Dementieva defeated (United States) Serena Williams, 6–3, 6–2

- It was Dementieva's first title of the year, 15th of her career, and her second consecutive title at the event.

=== Men's doubles ===
(Canada) Daniel Nestor / (Serbia) Nenad Zimonjić defeated (United Kingdom) Ross Hutchins / (Australia) Jordan Kerr, 6–3, 7–6^{(7–5)}.

=== Women's doubles ===
(Zimbabwe) Cara Black / (United States) Liezel Huber defeated (Italy) Tathiana Garbin / (Russia) Nadia Petrova, 6–1, 3–6, [10–3]

== WTA entrants ==
=== Seeds ===
Country	Player	Rank*	Seed
USA	Serena Williams	1	1
RUS	Dinara Safina	2	2
RUS	Svetlana Kuznetsova	3	3
DEN	Caroline Wozniacki	4	4
RUS	Elena Dementieva	5	5
BLR	Victoria Azarenka	7	6
SRB	Jelena Janković	8	7
RUS	Vera Zvonareva	9	8

- As of 4 January 2010

=== Other entrants ===
The following players received wildcards into the singles main draw:

- (Australia) Casey Dellacqua
- (Belgium) Justine Henin (withdrew due to left gluteal strain)

The following players received entry into the singles main draw through qualifying:

- (United States) Jill Craybas
- (Japan) Kimiko Date-Krumm
- (Russia) Vera Dushevina
- (Germany) Anna-Lena Grönefeld
- (United States) Varvara Lepchenko
- (Hungary) Ágnes Szávay

The following players received entry into the singles main draw through the virtue of being a lucky loser:

- (Switzerland) Timea Bacsinszky

== ATP entrants ==
=== Seeds ===
Country	Player	Rank^{1}	Seed
FRA	Gaël Monfils	13	1
CZE	Tomáš Berdych	20	2
SUI	Stanislas Wawrinka	21	3
AUS	Lleyton Hewitt	22	4
USA	Sam Querrey	25	5
SRB	Victor Troicki	29	6
RUS	Igor Andreev	35	7
GER	Benjamin Becker	40	8

=== Other entrants ===
The following players received wildcards into the singles main draw:

- (Australia) Carsten Ball
- (Australia) Nick Lindahl
- (Australia) Peter Luczak

The following players received entry into the singles main draw through qualifying:

- (Argentina) Juan Ignacio Chela
- (Portugal) Frederico Gil
- (Australia) Marinko Matosevic
- (Argentina) Leonardo Mayer

The following players received the lucky loser spot:

- (United States) Taylor Dent
- (Spain) Daniel Gimeno Traver
