= 1985 Head Cup =

- Date: 5–11 August
- Edition: 15th
- Category: Grand Prix
- Draw: 64S / 32D
- Prize money: $150,000
- Surface: Clay / outdoor
- Location: Kitzbühel Austria
- Venue: Tennis stadium Kitzbühel

Champions

Singles
- (Czechoslovakia) Pavel Složil

Doubles
- (Spain) Sergio Casal / (Spain) Emilio Sánchez
← 1984 ·	Austrian Open Kitzbühel	· 1986 →

The 1985 Austrian Open (also known as the 1985 Head Cup for sponsorship reasons) was a men's tennis tournament played on outdoor clay courts. It was part of the 1985 Nabisco Grand Prix. It took place at the Tennis stadium Kitzbühel in Kitzbühel, Austria, from 5 August through 11 August 1985. Pavel Složil won the singles title.

== Finals ==
=== Singles ===
(Czechoslovakia) Pavel Složil defeated (West Germany) Michael Westphal, 7–5, 6–2

- It was Složil's only singles title of the year and the 2nd and last of his career.

=== Doubles ===
(Spain) Sergio Casal / (Spain) Emilio Sánchez defeated (Italy) Paolo Canè / (Italy) Claudio Panatta, 6–4, 7–6
