= 2022 Generali Open Kitzbühel =

- Date: 25 – 31 July
- Edition: 78th
- Category: World Tour 250 series
- Surface: Clay / Outdoor
- Location: Kitzbühel, Austria
- Venue: Tennis stadium Kitzbühel

Champions

Singles
- (Spain) Roberto Bautista Agut

Doubles
- (Spain) Pedro Martínez / (Italy) Lorenzo Sonego
← 2021 ·	Generali Open Kitzbühel	· 2023 →

The 2022 Generali Open Kitzbühel was a tennis tournament played on outdoor clay courts. It was the 78th edition of the Austrian Open Kitzbühel, and part of the World Tour 250 series of the 2022 ATP Tour. It took place at the Tennis stadium Kitzbühel in Kitzbühel, Austria, from 25 through 31 July 2022.

== Champions ==
=== Singles ===
- (Spain) Roberto Bautista Agut def. (Austria) Filip Misolic, 6–2, 6–2

=== Doubles ===
- (Spain) Pedro Martínez / (Italy) Lorenzo Sonego def. (Germany) Tim Pütz / (New Zealand) Michael Venus, 5–7, 6–4, [10–8]

== Points and prize money ==
=== Point distribution ===
Event	W	F	SF	QF	Round of 16	Round of 32	Q	Q2	Q1
Singles	250	150	90	45	20	0	12	6	0
Doubles	250	150	90	45	0	—	—	—	—

=== Prize money ===
Event	W	F	SF	QF	Round of 16	Round of 32	Q2	Q1
Singles	€81,310	€47,430	€27,885	€16,160	€9,380	€5,730	€2,870	€1,565
Doubles*	€28,250	€15,110	€8,860	€4,950	€2,920	—	—	—

_{*per team}

== Singles main draw entrants ==
=== Seeds ===
Country	Player	Rank^{1}	Seed
~~NOR~~	~~Casper Ruud~~	~~5~~	~~1~~
~~ITA~~	~~Matteo Berrettini~~	~~15~~	~~2~~
ESP	Roberto Bautista Agut	19	3
	Aslan Karatsev	37	4
ESP	Albert Ramos Viñolas	40	5
~~NED~~	~~Tallon Griekspoor~~	~~47~~	~~6~~
ESP	Pedro Martínez	52	7
POR	João Sousa	58	8
ITA	Lorenzo Sonego	60	9
FRA	Richard Gasquet	64	10

- ^{1} Rankings are as of 18 July 2022.

=== Other entrants ===
The following players received wildcards into the main draw:

- (Chile) Nicolás Jarry
- (Austria) Filip Misolic
- (Austria) Jurij Rodionov

The following player received entry with a protected ranking:

- (Austria) Dominic Thiem

The following players received entry from the qualifying draw:

- (Argentina) Hernán Casanova
- (Czech Republic) Vít Kopřiva
- (Austria) Gerald Melzer
- (Austria) Sebastian Ofner

The following players received entry as lucky losers:

- (Brazil) Daniel Dutra da Silva
- Ivan Gakhov
- (Ukraine) Vitaliy Sachko
- Alexander Shevchenko

=== Withdrawals ===
- (Italy) Matteo Berrettini → replaced by Alexander Shevchenko
- (Spain) Alejandro Davidovich Fokina → replaced by (Peru) Juan Pablo Varillas
- (Hungary) Márton Fucsovics → replaced by (Brazil) Daniel Dutra da Silva
- (Netherlands) Tallon Griekspoor → replaced by Ivan Gakhov
- (France) Gaël Monfils → replaced by (Czech Republic) Jiří Lehečka
- (Germany) Oscar Otte → replaced by (Spain) Carlos Taberner
- (France) Arthur Rinderknech → replaced by (Brazil) Thiago Monteiro
- (Norway) Casper Ruud → replaced by (Ukraine) Vitaliy Sachko

== Doubles main draw entrants ==
=== Seeds ===
Country	Player	Country	Player	Rank^{1}	Seed
GER	Tim Pütz	NZL	Michael Venus	26	1
~~IND~~	~~Rohan Bopanna~~	~~NED~~	~~Matwé Middelkoop~~	~~44~~	~~2~~
GER	Kevin Krawietz	GER	Andreas Mies	60	3
BEL	Sander Gillé	BEL	Joran Vliegen	100	4

- ^{1} Rankings as of 18 July 2022.

=== Other entrants ===
The following pairs received wildcards into the doubles main draw:

- (Austria) Lukas Neumayer / (Austria) Sebastian Ofner
- (Austria) Neil Oberleitner / (Austria) Jurij Rodionov

The following pair received entry as alternates:

- (Israel) Jonathan Erlich / (Portugal) João Sousa

=== Withdrawals ===
- (India) Rohan Bopanna / (Netherlands) Matwé Middelkoop → replaced by (Israel) Jonathan Erlich / (Portugal) João Sousa
- (Serbia) Nikola Ćaćić / (Serbia) Dušan Lajović → replaced by (Serbia) Nikola Ćaćić / (Philippines) Treat Huey
- (Spain) Marcel Granollers / (Spain) Pedro Martínez → replaced by (Spain) Pedro Martínez / (Italy) Lorenzo Sonego
