= 2022 Generali Open Kitzbühel – Doubles =

Doubles
- 2022 Generali Open Kitzbühel

Final
- Champions: (Spain) Pedro Martínez (Italy) Lorenzo Sonego
- Runners-up: (Germany) Tim Pütz (New Zealand) Michael Venus
- Score: 5–7, 6–4, [10–8]

Events
Singles	Doubles
← 2021 ·	Generali Open Kitzbühel	· 2023 →

Pedro Martínez and Lorenzo Sonego defeated Tim Pütz and Michael Venus in the final, 5–7, 6–4, [10–8] to win the doubles tennis title at the 2022 Generali Open Kitzbühel.

Alexander Erler and Lucas Miedler were the defending champions, but lost in the first round to Tallon Griekspoor and Bart Stevens.

== Seeds ==
1. (Germany) Tim Pütz / (New Zealand) Michael Venus (final)
2. (India) Rohan Bopanna / (Netherlands) Matwé Middelkoop (withdrew)
3. (Germany) Kevin Krawietz / (Germany) Andreas Mies (semifinals)
4. (Belgium) Sander Gillé / (Belgium) Joran Vliegen (first round)

== Draw ==
=== Key ===
- Q = Qualifier
- WC = Wild card
- LL = Lucky loser
- Alt = Alternate
- SE = Special exempt
- PR = Protected ranking
- ITF = ITF entry
- JE = Junior exempt
- w/o = Walkover
- r = Retired
- d = Defaulted
- SR = Special ranking

=== Draw ===
First round
1	(Germany) T Pütz (New Zealand) M Venus	6	6
WC	(Austria) L Neumayer (Austria) S Ofner	2	3
(Netherlands) T Griekspoor (Netherlands) B Stevens	6	1	[10]
(Austria) A Erler (Austria) L Miedler	3	6	[4]
3	(Germany) K Krawietz (Germany) A Mies	6	6
(Spain) A Ramos Viñolas (Spain) C Taberner	3	3
(Monaco) H Nys (Poland) J Zieliński	6	7^{9}
(Kazakhstan) A Nedovyesov (Pakistan) A-u-H Qureshi	4	6^{7}
(Serbia) N Ćaćić (Philippines) T Huey	6^{3}	6^{5}
(Spain) P Martínez (Italy) L Sonego	7^{7}	7^{7}
WC	(Austria) N Oberleitner (Austria) J Rodionov	6	3	[11]
4	(Belgium) S Gillé (Belgium) J Vliegen	4	6	[9]
(France) S Doumbia (France) F Reboul	1	7^{8}	[10]
(France) F Martin (United Kingdom) J O'Mara	6	6^{6}	[6]
(Netherlands) R Haase (Austria) P Oswald	6	6
Alt	(Israel) J Erlich (Portugal) J Sousa	4	4

Quarterfinals
1	(Germany) T Pütz (New Zealand) M Venus	w/o
(Netherlands) T Griekspoor (Netherlands) B Stevens
3	(Germany) K Krawietz (Germany) A Mies	6	6
(Monaco) H Nys (Poland) J Zieliński	4	1
(Spain) P Martínez (Italy) L Sonego	4	6	[10]
WC	(Austria) N Oberleitner (Austria) J Rodionov	6	4	[8]
(France) S Doumbia (France) F Reboul	4	3
(Netherlands) R Haase (Austria) P Oswald	6	6

Semifinals
1	(Germany) T Pütz (New Zealand) M Venus	7^{8}	7^{7}
3	(Germany) K Krawietz (Germany) A Mies	6^{6}	6^{0}
(Spain) P Martínez (Italy) L Sonego	7^{11}	7^{7}
(Netherlands) R Haase (Austria) P Oswald	6^{9}	6^{2}

Final
1	(Germany) T Pütz (New Zealand) M Venus	7	4	[8]
(Spain) P Martínez (Italy) L Sonego	5	6	[10]
