= 2022 Generali Open Kitzbühel – Singles =

Singles
- 2022 Generali Open Kitzbühel

Final
- Champion: (Spain) Roberto Bautista Agut
- Runner-up: (Austria) Filip Misolic
- Score: 6–2, 6–2

Details
- Draw: 28
- Seeds: 10

Events
Singles	Doubles
← 2021 ·	Generali Open Kitzbühel	· 2023 →

Roberto Bautista Agut defeated Filip Misolic in the final, 6–2, 6–2 to win the singles tennis title at the 2022 Generali Open Kitzbühel.

Casper Ruud was the reigning champion, but withdrew before the tournament.

== Seeds ==
The top four seeds receive a bye into the second round.

1. (Norway) Casper Ruud (withdrew)
2. (Italy) Matteo Berrettini (withdrew)
3. (Spain) Roberto Bautista Agut (champion)
4. Aslan Karatsev (second round)
5. (Spain) Albert Ramos Viñolas (semifinals)
6. (Netherlands) Tallon Griekspoor (withdrew)
7. (Spain) Pedro Martínez (quarterfinals)
8. (Portugal) João Sousa (second round)
9. (Italy) Lorenzo Sonego (first round)
10. (France) Richard Gasquet (first round)

== Draw ==
=== Key ===
- Q = Qualifier
- WC = Wild card
- LL = Lucky loser
- Alt = Alternate
- SE = Special exempt
- PR = Protected ranking
- ITF = ITF entry
- JE = Junior exempt
- w/o = Walkover
- r = Retired
- d = Defaulted
- SR = Special ranking

=== Finals ===
Semifinals
5	(Spain) Albert Ramos Viñolas	3	6^{3}
3	(Spain) Roberto Bautista Agut	6	7^{7}
WC	(Austria) Filip Misolic	6	2	7^{7}
(Germany) Yannick Hanfmann	2	6	6^{4}

Final
3	(Spain) Roberto Bautista Agut	6	6
WC	(Austria) Filip Misolic	2	2

=== Top half ===
First round
(Peru) JP Varillas	6	6
(Spain) C Taberner	4	3
(Argentina) F Coria	6	7
(Chile) C Garín	4	5
WC	(Chile) N Jarry	6^{4}	3
7	(Spain) P Martínez	7^{7}	6
Q	(Argentina) H Casanova	4	2
WC	(Austria) J Rodionov	6	6
(Czech Republic) J Lehečka	7^{8}	6
(Brazil) T Monteiro	6^{6}	4
Q	(Czech Republic) V Kopřiva	1	5
8	(Portugal) J Sousa	6	7

Second round
5	(Spain) A Ramos Viñolas	6	6
(Peru) JP Varillas	3	4
(Argentina) F Coria	4	3
7	(Spain) P Martínez	6	6
3	(Spain) R Bautista Agut	6	6
WC	(Austria) J Rodionov	1	4
(Czech Republic) J Lehečka	7^{8}	1	6
8	(Portugal) J Sousa	6^{6}	6	3

Quarterfinals
5	(Spain) A Ramos Viñolas	6	6
7	(Spain) P Martínez	4	2
3	(Spain) R Bautista Agut	4	7	7
(Czech Republic) J Lehečka	6	5	5

Semifinals
5	(Spain) A Ramos Viñolas	3	6^{3}
3	(Spain) R Bautista Agut	6	7^{7}

=== Bottom half ===
First round
9	(Italy) L Sonego	4	6	6^{4}
(Spain) P Andújar	6	3	7^{7}
LL	(Brazil) D Dutra da Silva	2	6^{6}
WC	(Austria) F Misolic	6	7^{8}
LL	(Ukraine) V Sachko	4	6^{5}
(Serbia) D Lajović	6	7^{7}
10	(France) R Gasquet	6	5	5
Q	(Austria) S Ofner	1	7	7
LL	A Shevchenko	4	2
PR	(Austria) D Thiem	6	6
Q	(Austria) G Melzer	4	1^{r}
(Germany) Y Hanfmann	6	1

Second round
(Spain) P Andújar	4	0
WC	(Austria) F Misolic	6	6
(Serbia) D Lajović	7	6
4	A Karatsev	5	3
Q	(Austria) S Ofner	2	6	3
PR	(Austria) D Thiem	6	3	6
(Germany) Y Hanfmann	6	6^{5}	6
LL	I Gakhov	3	7^{7}	4

Quarterfinals
WC	(Austria) F Misolic	2	7^{7}	6
(Serbia) D Lajović	6	6^{5}	3
PR	(Austria) D Thiem	4	6	4
(Germany) Y Hanfmann	6	3	6

Semifinals
WC	(Austria) F Misolic	6	2	7^{7}
(Germany) Y Hanfmann	2	6	6^{4}

== Qualifying ==
=== Seeds ===
1. Pavel Kotov (first round)
2. (Czech Republic) Vít Kopřiva (qualified)
3. (Belgium) Zizou Bergs (first round)
4. (France) Manuel Guinard (first round)
5. Alexander Shevchenko (qualifying competition, lucky loser)
6. (Austria) Gerald Melzer (qualified)
7. (France) Evan Furness (first round)
8. (Brazil) Daniel Dutra da Silva (qualifying competition, lucky loser)

=== Qualifiers ===
1. (Austria) Sebastian Ofner
2. (Czech Republic) Vít Kopřiva
3. (Austria) Gerald Melzer
4. (Argentina) Hernán Casanova

=== Lucky losers ===
1. (Brazil) Daniel Dutra da Silva
2. (Ukraine) Vitaliy Sachko
3. Alexander Shevchenko
4. Ivan Gakhov

=== Qualifying draw ===
==== First qualifier ====
First round
1	Pavel Kotov	6^{5}	5
(Austria) Sebastian Ofner	7^{7}	7
(Ukraine) Vitaliy Sachko	7	6
7	(France) Evan Furness	5	3

Qualifying competition
(Austria) Sebastian Ofner	6	6
(Ukraine) Vitaliy Sachko	4	4

==== Second qualifier ====
First round
2	(Czech Republic) Vít Kopřiva	3	6	6
WC	(Austria) Lukas Neumayer	6	4	1
(Slovakia) Lukáš Klein	4	3
5	Alexander Shevchenko	6	6

Qualifying competition
2	(Czech Republic) Vít Kopřiva	1	6	6
5	Alexander Shevchenko	6	4	4

==== Third qualifier ====
First round
3	(Belgium) Zizou Bergs	4	3
Alt	Ivan Gakhov	6	6
WC	(Serbia) Hamad Međedović	6	2	2
6	(Austria) Gerald Melzer	2	6	6

Qualifying competition
Alt	Ivan Gakhov	3	6	3
6	(Austria) Gerald Melzer	6	3	6

==== Fourth qualifier ====
First round
4	(France) Manuel Guinard	3	5
Alt	(Argentina) Hernán Casanova	6	7
Alt	(Tunisia) Malek Jaziri	5	6	2
8	(Brazil) Daniel Dutra da Silva	7	4	6

Qualifying competition
Alt	(Argentina) Hernán Casanova	1	7^{7}	6
8	(Brazil) Daniel Dutra da Silva	6	6^{3}	1
