= 1980 Austrian Open (tennis) =

- Date: 21–27 July
- Edition: 10th
- Category: Grand Prix circuit (m); Colgate Series (w)
- Draw: 32S / 16D
- Prize money: $75,000
- Surface: Clay / outdoor
- Location: Kitzbühel, Austria
- Venue: Tennis stadium Kitzbühel

Champions

Men's singles
- (Argentina) Guillermo Vilas

Women's singles
- (Romania) Virginia Ruzici

Men's doubles
- (West Germany) Ulrich Marten / (West Germany) Klaus Eberhard

Women's doubles
- (West Germany) Claudia Kohde / (West Germany) Eva Pfaff
- Austrian Open

The 1980 Austrian Open , also known as the 1980 Head Cup for sponsorship reasons, was a combined men's and women's tennis tournament played on outdoor clay courts. It was categorized as a two-star tournament and was part of the men's 1980 Volvo Grand Prix circuit and of the Colgate Series of the women's 1980 WTA Tour. It took place at the Tennis Stadium Kitzbühel in Kitzbühel, Austria and was held from 21 July through 27 July 1980. First-seeded Guillermo Vilas won the men's singles title and the accompanying $13,000 first-prize money while Virginia Ruzici won the women's singles event.

== Finals ==
=== Men's singles ===
(Argentina) Guillermo Vilas defeated (Czechoslovakia) Ivan Lendl 6–3, 6–2, 6–2

=== Women's singles ===
(Romania) Virginia Ruzici defeated (Czechoslovakia) Hana Mandlíková 3–5, 6–1, ret.

=== Men's doubles ===
(West Germany) Ulrich Marten / (West Germany) Klaus Eberhard defeated (Brazil) Carlos Kirmayr / (Australia) Chris Lewis 6–4, 3–6, 6–4

=== Women's doubles ===
(West Germany) Claudia Kohde / (West Germany) Eva Pfaff defeated (Czechoslovakia) Hana Mandlíková / (Czechoslovakia) Renáta Tomanová w.o.
