= 2023 Generali Open Kitzbühel – Singles =

Singles
- 2023 Generali Open Kitzbühel

Final
- Champion: (Argentina) Sebastián Báez
- Runner-up: (Austria) Dominic Thiem
- Score: 6–3, 6–1

Details
- Draw: 28
- Seeds: 8

Events
Singles	Doubles
← 2022 ·	Generali Open Kitzbühel	· 2024 →

Sebastián Báez defeated Dominic Thiem in the final, 6–3, 6–1 to win the singles tennis title at the 2023 Austrian Open Kitzbühel. It was his third ATP Tour singles title. This was Thiem's first appearance in an ATP Tour final since the 2020 ATP Finals, and his last before retiring from professional tennis the following year. Thiem was also the second consecutive Austrian wildcard to reach the final, after Filip Misolic the previous year.

Roberto Bautista Agut was the reigning champion, but withdrew before the tournament began.

== Seeds ==
The top four seeds received a bye into the second round.

1. (Argentina) Tomás Martín Etcheverry (semifinals)
2. (Germany) Yannick Hanfmann (second round)
3. (Argentina) Pedro Cachin (quarterfinals)
4. (Austria) Sebastian Ofner (second round)
5. (Serbia) Laslo Djere (semifinals)
6. (Spain) Roberto Carballés Baena (second round)
7. (Serbia) Dušan Lajović (first round)
8. (Germany) Daniel Altmaier (second round)

== Draw ==
=== Key ===
- Q = Qualifier
- WC = Wild card
- LL = Lucky loser
- Alt = Alternate
- SE = Special exempt
- PR = Protected ranking
- ITF = ITF entry
- JE = Junior exempt
- w/o = Walkover
- r = Retired
- d = Defaulted
- SR = Special ranking

=== Finals ===
Semifinals
1	(Argentina) Tomás Martín Etcheverry	6^{5}	6	4
(Argentina) Sebastián Báez	7^{7}	3	6
5	(Serbia) Laslo Djere	7^{7}	5	6^{8}
WC	(Austria) Dominic Thiem	6^{3}	7	7^{10}

Final
(Argentina) Sebastián Báez	6	6
WC	(Austria) Dominic Thiem	3	1

=== Top half ===
First round
Q	(Argentina) G Andreozzi	5	6	6
WC	(Austria) F Misolic	7	4	2
(Italy) M Cecchinato	2	2
(Colombia) DE Galán	6	6
(Switzerland) M-A Hüsler	7^{7}	2	4
8	(Germany) D Altmaier	6^{5}	6	6
(France) L Van Assche	4	3
(Slovakia) A Molčan	6	6
Q	(Serbia) H Medjedovic	4	2
(Argentina) S Báez	6	6
PR	(Argentina) G Pella	2	4
6	(Spain) R Carballés Baena	6	6

Second round
1	(Argentina) TM Etcheverry	6	6
Q	(Argentina) G Andreozzi	2	2
(Colombia) DE Galán	3	6	7^{10}
8	(Germany) D Altmaier	6	2	6^{8}
4	(Austria) S Ofner	6	5	6^{5}
(Slovakia) A Molčan	4	7	7^{7}
(Argentina) S Báez	6	6
6	(Spain) R Carballés Baena	1	2

Quarterfinals
1	(Argentina) TM Etcheverry	6^{6}	6	6
(Colombia) DE Galán	7^{8}	3	4
(Slovakia) A Molčan	4	3
(Argentina) S Báez	6	6

Semifinals
1	(Argentina) TM Etcheverry	6^{5}	6	4
(Argentina) S Báez	7^{7}	3	6

=== Bottom half ===
First round
5	(Serbia) L Djere	6	7^{7}
(Australia) C O'Connell	4	6^{4}
WC	(Brazil) T Seyboth Wild	6	6
Q	(Austria) D Novak	3	4
(Spain) A Ramos Viñolas	6	7
(Peru) JP Varillas	1	5
7	(Serbia) D Lajović	3	2
(China) Z Zhang	6	6
Q	(Argentina) F Bagnis	6^{3}	6^{6}
WC	(Austria) D Thiem	7^{7}	7^{8}
LL	(Argentina) JM Cerúndolo	7^{7}	4	2
(France) A Rinderknech	6^{3}	6	6

Second round
5	(Serbia) L Djere	7^{7}	6
WC	(Brazil) T Seyboth Wild	6^{5}	3
(Spain) A Ramos Viñolas	5	3
3	(Argentina) P Cachin	7	6
(China) Z Zhang	6	3	2
WC	(Austria) D Thiem	1	6	6
(France) A Rinderknech	7^{7}	6
2	(Germany) Y Hanfmann	6^{3}	3

Quarterfinals
5	(Serbia) L Djere	6	6
3	(Argentina) P Cachin	4	2
WC	(Austria) D Thiem	4	6	6
(France) A Rinderknech	6	3	4

Semifinals
5	(Serbia) L Djere	7^{7}	5	6^{8}
WC	(Austria) D Thiem	6^{3}	7	7^{10}

== Qualifying ==
=== Seeds ===
1. (Argentina) Federico Coria (first round)
2. (Argentina) Juan Manuel Cerúndolo (qualifying competition, lucky loser)
3. (Brazil) Thiago Monteiro (qualifying competition)
4. (Argentina) Facundo Bagnis (qualified)
5. (Serbia) Hamad Medjedovic (qualified)
6. Ivan Gakhov (qualifying competition)
7. (Austria) Dennis Novak (qualified)
8. (Netherlands) Jesper de Jong (first round)

=== Qualifiers ===
1. (Serbia) Hamad Medjedovic
2. (Argentina) Guido Andreozzi
3. (Austria) Dennis Novak
4. (Argentina) Facundo Bagnis

=== Lucky loser ===
1. (Argentina) Juan Manuel Cerúndolo

=== Qualifying draw ===
==== First qualifier ====
First round
1	(Argentina) Federico Coria	1	2
(Austria) Lukas Neumayer	6	6
Alt	(Austria) Lucas Miedler	4	6^{4}
5	(Serbia) Hamad Medjedovic	6	7^{7}

Qualifying competition
(Austria) Lukas Neumayer	3	1
5	(Serbia) Hamad Medjedovic	6	6

==== Second qualifier ====
First round
2	(Argentina) Juan Manuel Cerúndolo	6	6
(Italy) Francesco Maestrelli	3	2
(Argentina) Guido Andreozzi	7^{7}	6
8	(Netherlands) Jesper de Jong	6^{4}	2

Qualifying competition
2	(Argentina) Juan Manuel Cerúndolo	2	4
(Argentina) Guido Andreozzi	6	6

==== Third qualifier ====
First round
3	(Brazil) Thiago Monteiro	7	6
Alt	(Czech Republic) Lukáš Rosol	5	0
WC	(Austria) Joel Schwärzler	4	1
7	(Austria) Dennis Novak	6	6

Qualifying competition
3	(Brazil) Thiago Monteiro	4	3
7	(Austria) Dennis Novak	6	6

==== Fourth qualifier ====
First round
4	(Argentina) Facundo Bagnis	6^{6}	6	6
(Austria) Maximilian Neuchrist	7^{8}	2	1
WC	(Switzerland) Kilian Feldbausch	4	6^{0}
6	Ivan Gakhov	6	7^{7}

Qualifying competition
4	(Argentina) Facundo Bagnis	4	6	6
6	Ivan Gakhov	6	3	4
