= 1976 Austrian Open (tennis) =

- Date: 12–19 July
- Edition: 6th
- Category: Grand Prix circuit
- Draw: 64S / 32D
- Prize money: $75,000
- Surface: Clay / outdoor
- Location: Kitzbühel, Austria
- Venue: Tennis Stadium Kitzbühel

Champions

Singles
- (Spain) Manuel Orantes

Doubles
- (Czechoslovakia) Jiří Hřebec / (Czechoslovakia) Jan Kodeš
- Austrian Open

The 1976 Austrian Open , also known as the 1976 Head Cup for sponsorship reasons, was a tennis tournament played on outdoor clay courts. It was categorized as a two-star tournament and was part of the 1976 Commercial Union Assurance Grand Prix circuit. It took place at the Tennis Stadium Kitzbühel in Kitzbühel Austria and was held from 12 July until 19 July 1976. Manuel Orantes won the singles title.

== Finals ==
=== Singles ===
(Spain) Manuel Orantes defeated (Czechoslovakia) Jan Kodeš 7–6, 6–2, 7–6

- It was Orantes 3rd singles title of the year and the 25th open era title of his career.

=== Doubles ===
(Czechoslovakia) Jiří Hřebec / (Czechoslovakia) Jan Kodeš defeated (West Germany) Jürgen Fassbender / (West Germany) Hans-Jürgen Pohmann 6–7, 6–2, 6–4
