= 1977 Austrian Open (tennis) =

- Date: 11–17 July
- Edition: 7th
- Category: Grand Prix (Two Star)
- Draw: 32S / 16D
- Prize money: $75,000
- Surface: Clay / outdoor
- Location: Kitzbühel, Austria
- Venue: Tennis Stadium Kitzbühel

Champions

Singles
- (Argentina) Guillermo Vilas

Doubles
- (United Kingdom) Buster Mottram / (United Kingdom) Roger Taylor
- Austrian Open

The 1977 Austrian Open , also known as the Head Cup for sponsorship reasons, was a men's tennis tournament played on outdoor clay courts. The tournament was categorized as a two-star tournament and was part of the Colgate-Palmolive Grand Prix circuit. It took place at the Tennis Stadium Kitzbühel in Kitzbühel, Austria and was held from 11 July through 17 July 1977. Guillermo Vilas won the singles title after a final that lasted 4 hours and 45 minutes.

== Finals ==
=== Singles ===
(Argentina) Guillermo Vilas defeated (Czechoslovakia) Jan Kodeš 5–7, 6–2, 4–6, 6–3, 6–2

=== Doubles ===
(United Kingdom) Buster Mottram / (United Kingdom) Roger Taylor defeated (Rhodesia) Colin Dowdeswell / (Australia) Chris Kachel 7–6, 6–4
