= 1975 Austrian Open (tennis) =

- Date: 7–13 July
- Edition: 5th
- Category: Grand Prix circuit (Grade B)
- Draw: 32S / 16D
- Prize money: $75,000
- Surface: Clay / outdoor
- Location: Kitzbühel, Austria
- Venue: Tennis stadium Kitzbühel

Champions

Men's singles
- (Italy) Adriano Panatta

Women's singles
- (United Kingdom) Sue Barker

Men's doubles
- (Italy) Paolo Bertolucci / (Italy) Adriano Panatta

Women's doubles
- (United Kingdom) Sue Barker / (United States) Pam Teeguarden
- Austrian Open

The 1975 Austrian Open was a combined men's and women's tennis tournament played on outdoor clay courts. It was categorized as Grade B tournament and was part of the 1975 Commercial Union Assurance Grand Prix circuit. It took place at the Tennis stadium Kitzbühel in Kitzbühel, Austria and was held from 7 July through 13 July 1975. Adriano Panatta and Sue Barker won the singles titles.

== Finals ==
=== Men's singles ===
(Italy) Adriano Panatta defeated (Czechoslovakia) Jan Kodeš 2–6, 6–2, 7–5, 6–4

=== Women's singles ===
(United Kingdom) Sue Barker defeated (United States) Pam Teeguarden 6–4, 6–4

=== Men's doubles ===
(Italy) Paolo Bertolucci / (Italy) Adriano Panatta defeated (France) Patrice Dominguez / (France) François Jauffret 6–2, 6–2, 7–6

=== Women's doubles ===
(United Kingdom) Sue Barker / (United States) Pam Teeguarden defeated (Uruguay) Fiorella Bonicelli / (Argentina) Raquel Giscafré 6–4, 6–3
