= 1986 Head Cup =

- Date: 4–10 August
- Edition: 16th
- Category: Grand Prix
- Draw: 64S / 32D
- Prize money: $150,000
- Surface: Clay / outdoor
- Location: Kitzbühel Austria
- Venue: Tennis stadium Kitzbühel

Champions

Singles
- (Czechoslovakia) Miloslav Mečíř

Doubles
- (Switzerland) Heinz Günthardt / (Czechoslovakia) Tomáš Šmíd
- Austrian Open Kitzbühel

The 1986 Head Cup, also known as the 1986 Austrian Open Kitzbühel, was a men's tennis tournament played on outdoor clay courts that was part of the 1986 Nabisco Grand Prix. It was the 16th edition of the tournament and took place at the Tennis stadium Kitzbühel in Kitzbühel, Austria, from 4 August until 10 August 1986. Sixth-seeded Miloslav Mečíř, who entered the main draw on a wildcard, won the singles title.

== Finals ==
=== Singles ===
(Czechoslovakia) Miloslav Mečíř defeated (Ecuador) Andrés Gómez, 6–4, 4–6, 6–1, 2–6, 6–3

- It was Mečíř's only singles title of the year and the 3rd of his career.

=== Doubles ===
(Switzerland) Heinz Günthardt / (Czechoslovakia) Tomáš Šmíd defeated (Chile) Hans Gildemeister / (Ecuador) Andrés Gómez, 4–6, 6–3, 7–6
