= 2023 Generali Open Kitzbühel – Doubles =

Doubles
- 2023 Generali Open Kitzbühel

Final
- Champions: (Austria) Alexander Erler (Austria) Lucas Miedler
- Runners-up: (Ecuador) Gonzalo Escobar (Kazakhstan) Aleksandr Nedovyesov
- Score: 6–4, 6–4

Events
Singles	Doubles
- Generali Open Kitzbühel

Alexander Erler and Lucas Miedler defeated Gonzalo Escobar and Aleksandr Nedovyesov in the final, 6–4, 6–4 to win the doubles tennis title at the 2023 Generali Open Kitzbühel. It was their second title at the event, after 2021.

Pedro Martínez and Lorenzo Sonego were the reigning champions, but chose not to defend their title.

== Seeds ==
1. (Austria) Alexander Erler / (Austria) Lucas Miedler (champions)
2. (Italy) Simone Bolelli / (Italy) Andrea Vavassori (quarterfinals)
3. (France) Sadio Doumbia / (France) Fabien Reboul (semifinals)
4. (Ecuador) Gonzalo Escobar / (Kazakhstan) Aleksandr Nedovyesov (final)

== Draw ==
Key

- Q = Qualifier
- WC = Wild card
- LL = Lucky loser
- Alt = Alternate
- ITF = ITF entry
- PR = Protected ranking
- SR = Special ranking
- SE = Special exempt
- JE = Junior exempt
- JR = Junior Accelerator Programme entrant
- CO = College Accelerator Programme entrant
- NG = Next Gen Accelerator Program entrant
- w/o = Walkover
- r = Retired
- d = Defaulted

=== Draw ===
First round
1	(Austria) A Erler (Austria) L Miedler	6	6
(Serbia) N Ćaćić (Romania) VV Cornea	2	4
(Uruguay) A Behar (Czech Republic) A Pavlásek	6	6^{6}	[10]
(Kazakhstan) A Golubev (Ukraine) D Molchanov	3	7^{8}	[7]
3	(France) S Doumbia (France) F Reboul	7^{8}	4	[11]
(France) A Olivetti (Spain) D Vega Hernández	6^{6}	6	[9]
WC	(Austria) S Ofner (Austria) D Thiem	6	6^{5}	[7]
(Argentina) G Andreozzi (Argentina) G Durán	4	7^{7}	[10]
(Monaco) R Arneodo (Austria) S Weissborn	6	6
(Argentina) P Cachin (Argentina) TM Etcheverry	4	2
(Brazil) M Demoliner (Austria) P Oswald	3	4
4	(Ecuador) G Escobar (Kazakhstan) A Nedovyesov	6	6
(Netherlands) M Middelkoop (Netherlands) D Pel	6^{5}	3
(Portugal) F Cabral (Brazil) R Matos	7^{7}	6
WC	(Austria) F Misolic (Austria) JJ Schwärzler	5	3
2	(Italy) S Bolelli (Italy) A Vavassori	7	6

Quarterfinals
1	(Austria) A Erler (Austria) L Miedler	7^{11}	6
(Uruguay) A Behar (Czech Republic) A Pavlásek	6^{9}	4
3	(France) S Doumbia (France) F Reboul	7^{7}	7^{7}
(Argentina) G Andreozzi (Argentina) G Durán	6^{5}	6^{3}
(Monaco) R Arneodo (Austria) S Weissborn	3	2
4	(Ecuador) G Escobar (Kazakhstan) A Nedovyesov	6	6
(Portugal) F Cabral (Brazil) R Matos	7^{7}	7^{7}
2	(Italy) S Bolelli (Italy) A Vavassori	6^{3}	6^{5}

Semifinals
1	(Austria) A Erler (Austria) L Miedler	7	7^{13}
3	(France) S Doumbia (France) F Reboul	5	6^{11}
4	(Ecuador) G Escobar (Kazakhstan) A Nedovyesov	4	6	[10]
(Portugal) F Cabral (Brazil) R Matos	6	3	[7]

Final
1	(Austria) A Erler (Austria) L Miedler	6	6
4	(Ecuador) G Escobar (Kazakhstan) A Nedovyesov	4	4
