= 2023 Generali Open Kitzbühel =

- Date: 31 July – 5 August
- Edition: 79th
- Category: World Tour 250 series
- Surface: Clay / Outdoor
- Location: Kitzbühel, Austria
- Venue: Tennis stadium Kitzbühel

Champions

Singles
- (Argentina) Sebastián Báez

Doubles
- (Austria) Alexander Erler / (Austria) Lucas Miedler
- Generali Open Kitzbühel

The 2023 Generali Open Kitzbühel was a tennis tournament played on outdoor clay courts. It was the 79th edition of the Austrian Open Kitzbühel, and part of the World Tour 250 series of the 2023 ATP Tour. It took place at the Tennis stadium Kitzbühel in Kitzbühel, Austria, from 31 July through 5 August 2023.

== Champions ==
=== Singles ===
- (Argentina) Sebastián Báez def. (Austria) Dominic Thiem, 6–3, 6–1

=== Doubles ===
- (Austria) Alexander Erler / (Austria) Lucas Miedler def. (Ecuador) Gonzalo Escobar / (Kazakhstan) Aleksandr Nedovyesov, 6–4, 6–4

== Points and prize money ==
=== Point distribution ===
Event	W	F	SF	QF	Round of 16	Round of 32	Q	Q2	Q1
Singles	250	150	90	45	20	0	12	6	0
Doubles	250	150	90	45	0	—N/a	—N/a	—N/a	—N/a

=== Prize money ===
Event	W	F	SF	QF	Round of 16	Round of 32	Q2	Q1
Singles	€85,605	€49,940	€29,355	€17,010	€9,880	€6,035	€3,020	€1,645
Doubles*	€29,740	€15,910	€9,330	€5,220	€3,070	—N/a	—N/a	—N/a

_{*per team}

== Singles main draw entrants ==
=== Seeds ===
Country	Player	Rank^{1}	Seed
ARG	Tomás Martín Etcheverry	34	1
GER	Yannick Hanfmann	45	2
ARG	Pedro Cachin	49	3
AUT	Sebastian Ofner	52	4
SRB	Laslo Djere	57	5
ESP	Roberto Carballés Baena	59	6
SRB	Dušan Lajović	60	7
GER	Daniel Altmaier	61	8

- ^{1} Rankings are as of 24 July 2023.

=== Other entrants ===
The following players received wildcards into the main draw:

- (Austria) Filip Misolic
- (Brazil) Thiago Seyboth Wild
- (Austria) Dominic Thiem

The following player received entry with a protected ranking:

- (Argentina) Guido Pella

The following player received entry as a special exempt:

- ~~(Australia) Alexei Popyrin~~

The following players received entry from the qualifying draw:

- (Argentina) Guido Andreozzi
- (Argentina) Facundo Bagnis
- (Serbia) Hamad Medjedovic
- (Austria) Dennis Novak

The following player received entry as a lucky loser:

- (Argentina) Juan Manuel Cerúndolo

=== Withdrawals ===
- (Spain) Roberto Bautista Agut → replaced by (France) Arthur Rinderknech
- (Serbia) Miomir Kecmanović → replaced by (Slovakia) Alex Molčan
- (Australia) Alexei Popyrin → replaced by (Argentina) Juan Manuel Cerúndolo
- (Italy) Lorenzo Sonego → replaced by (Colombia) Daniel Elahi Galán
- (Netherlands) Botic van de Zandschulp → replaced by (Switzerland) Marc-Andrea Hüsler

== Doubles main draw entrants ==
=== Seeds ===
Country	Player	Country	Player	Rank^{1}	Seed
AUT	Alexander Erler	AUT	Lucas Miedler	77	1
ITA	Simone Bolelli	ITA	Andrea Vavassori	84	2
FRA	Sadio Doumbia	FRA	Fabien Reboul	90	3
ECU	Gonzalo Escobar	KAZ	Aleksandr Nedovyesov	96	4

- ^{1} Rankings as of 24 July 2023.

=== Other entrants ===
The following pairs received wildcards into the doubles main draw:

- (Austria) Filip Misolic / (Austria) Joel Schwärzler
- (Austria) Sebastian Ofner / (Austria) Dominic Thiem
