= Herbert Dering =

British diplomat

Sir Herbert Guy Dering, KCMG, KCIE, MVO (13 November 1867 – 29 May 1933) was a British diplomat.

The second son of the British diplomat Sir Henry Dering, 9th Baronet, Dering was educated at Eton College. He entered HM Diplomatic Service in 1892 and served in Berlin, Constantinople, Peking (where he received the China War Medal with the Defence of Legations clasp), Washington, Stockholm, and Rome.

He was British Minister to Siam from 1915 to 1919, British High Commissioner to Bulgaria from 1919 to 1920, and British Minister to Romania from 1920 to 1926.

Dering was appointed MVO in 1908, KCMG in 1917, and KCIE in 1919. He received the third class of Swedish Order of the Polar Star in 1908 and the Grand Cross of the Order of the Star of Roumania in 1922.

== Family ==
Dering married in 1920 Edith Ann Mountjoy Sanders, previously married to James Ross Middleton Smith (died 1918), daughter of James Sanders of South Molton. Her first husband was chief manager of HSBC from 1902 to 1910.
