= Dominic Thiem =

Austrian tennis player (born 1993)

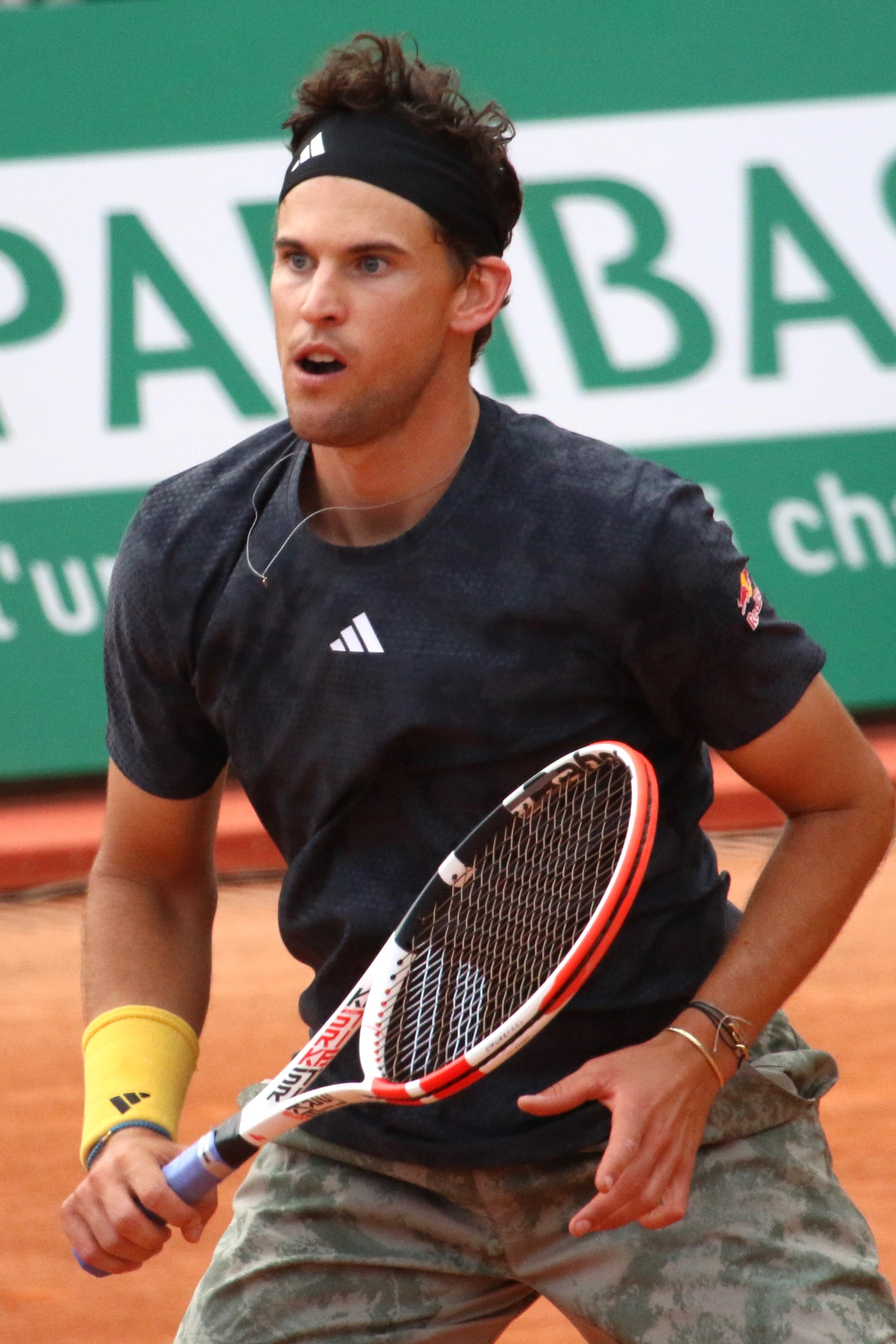
- Thiem at the 2023 Monte-Carlo Masters
- Country (sports): Austria
- Residence: Lichtenwörth, Austria
- Born: 3 September 1993 (age 33) Wiener Neustadt, Austria
- Height: 1.85 m (6 ft 1 in)
- Turned pro: 2011
- Retired: 2024
- Plays: Right-handed (one-handed backhand)
- Coach: Günter Bresnik (2002–2019); Nicolás Massú (2019–2023); Benjamin Ebrahimzadeh (2023–2024); Mate Delić (2024)
- Prize money: US$30,387,561: 17th all-time in earnings
- Official website: dominicthiem.at

Singles
- Career record: 348–215 (61.8%) (Note: in ATP Tour and Grand Slam main draw matches, and in Davis Cup)
- Career titles: 17
- Highest ranking: No. 3 (2 March 2020)

Grand Slam singles results
- Australian Open: F (2020)
- French Open: F (2018, 2019)
- Wimbledon: 4R (2017)
- US Open: W (2020)

Other tournaments
- Tour Finals: F (2019, 2020)

Doubles
- Career record: 40–78 (33.9%)
- Career titles: 0
- Highest ranking: No. 67 (7 October 2019)

Grand Slam doubles results
- Australian Open: 2R (2016)
- French Open: 1R (2014, 2015, 2016)
- Wimbledon: 2R (2014)
- US Open: 2R (2014, 2016)

Team competitions
- Davis Cup: 10–6

Dominic Thiem (German pronunciation: [ˈdɔmɪnɪk ˈtiːm]; born 3 September 1993) is an Austrian former professional tennis player. He was ranked world No. 3 in singles by the Association of Tennis Professionals, achieved in March 2020. Thiem won 17 ATP Tour-level singles titles, including a major at the 2020 US Open. He was also runner-up at three other majors (the 2018 and 2019 French Opens, and at the 2020 Australian Open), and at the 2019 and 2020 ATP Finals.

As a junior, Thiem was ranked as high as world No. 2, achieved by finishing runner-up at the 2011 French Open boys tournament and winning the 2011 Orange Bowl. As a professional, he broke into the top 100 for the first time in 2014. In 2015, he won his first ATP title at the 2015 Open de Nice Côte d'Azur. Thiem reached his first major semifinal at the 2016 French Open. In doing so, he first entered the top ten in the ATP rankings. He went on to reach his first Masters 1000 final in 2017 at the Madrid Open, then reaching his first major final the next year.

Thiem won a Masters 1000 title at the 2019 Indian Wells Masters, beating Roger Federer in the final, before going on to reach three more major finals, winning the last at the 2020 US Open. With that win, Thiem became the first man born in the 1990s to claim a major singles title, as well as only the second Austrian to a singles major. In 2021, Thiem suffered a wrist injury from which he never fully recovered, ultimately retiring from the sport following the 2024 Vienna Open.

Thiem had some of the heaviest groundstrokes of the tour, consistently hitting big with both his forehand and single-handed backhand. Generally thought of as a baseliner, he added more variety with the use of a sliced backhand and more netplay after adding coach Nicolás Massú to his team in March 2019. At 1.85 m (6 ft 1 in), he possessed a serve reaching up to 145 miles per hour (233 km/h), which he often used to set up effective one-two punches. Thiem remains the last one-handed backhand player to win a singles major. Thiem won the 2020 Austrian Sportsman of the Year award, the fourth time a tennis player has won the award since its creation in 1949.

== Early life and background ==
Thiem was born in Wiener Neustadt, Austria, on 3 September 1993 to Wolfgang and Karin Thiem, both of whom are tennis coaches. He has a younger brother, Moritz Thiem, who is also a professional tennis player. Thiem grew up in Lichtenwörth and began playing tennis when he was six years old.

Thiem's father, Wolfgang, began working as a coach at Günter Bresnik's academy in Vienna in 1997, when Thiem was just three years old. Bresnik became Thiem's coach formally from age nine. It was Bresnik who advised the change of Thiem's two-handed backhand to a one-handed backhand when he was 12 years old. Bresnik has said that Thiem's junior results took a dip for about a year while the stroke developed. Thiem struggled with health issues when he was 17 years old, which he attributed to a large growth spurt of 16 centimetres (6 in) he had that year.

== Junior career ==
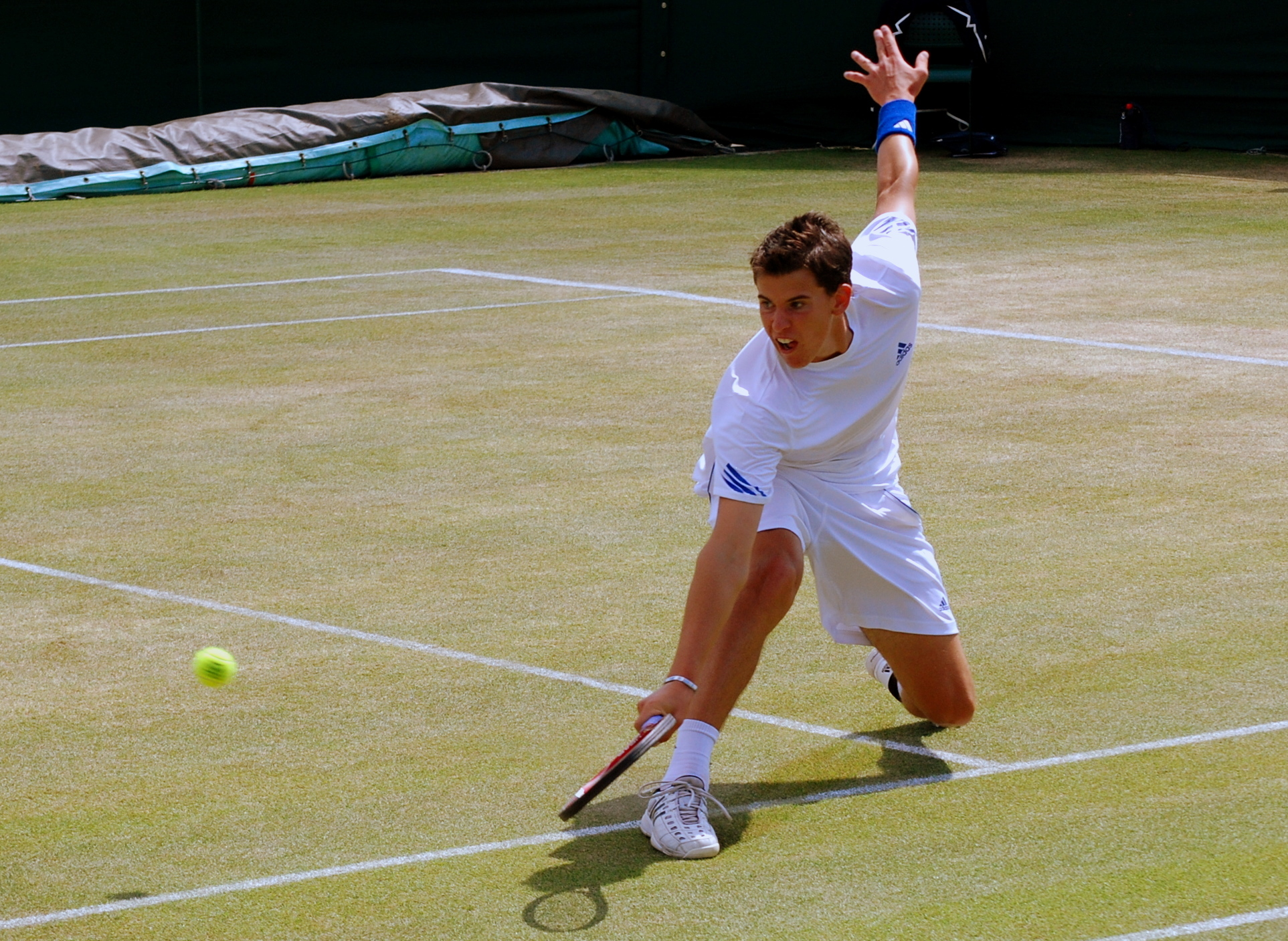
Thiem at the 2011 Wimbledon Championships

Thiem entered his first event on the International Tennis Federation (ITF) junior circuit in early 2008 when he was 14. Thiem reached an ITF Junior Circuit ranking of world No. 2 (combined singles and doubles) on 3 January 2011. He did not play many events in 2008, returning with a fuller schedule in 2009. He won his first junior title at the Preveza Cup, a Grade 5 tournament held on hard court in Greece. Thiem followed this with another title in 2009 at the Grawe Junior Cup, a slightly higher level Grade 4 tournament, on clay in Croatia.

In 2010 Thiem won his first Grade 1 tournament on clay at the Country Club Barranquilla Open, in Colombia, without dropping a set. He followed this with a title in Peru at the Grade 2 Inka Bowl and another Grade 1 title at the 32nd Torneo Internazionale "Citta' Di Santa Croce" Mauro Sabatini in Italy. He was seeded eighth at the 2010 French Open Junior Championships but lost in the first round to Ashley Hewitt. He also lost in the first round of the US Open Junior Championships before winning the XXIV Yucatán World Cup 2010 and the Eddie Herr International Junior Tennis Championships back to back.

Thiem reached the second round at the Australian Open Junior Championships in early 2011. In May he reached the final of the 2011 French Open boys' event losing a close final to Bjorn Fratangelo, in three sets. He won the next tournament he played, the 12th Gerry Weber Junior Open, a Grade 2 tournament held on grass. He lost in the third round of the Junior Championships, Wimbledon, and in the first round at the 2011 US Open Junior Championships. Thiem completed his junior career by winning his last three singles tournaments, the XXV Yucatán Cup, the Eddie Herr International Junior Tennis Championships and culminating in taking the title at the Orange Bowl International Tennis Championship in Plantation, Florida, United States.

Thiem finished his junior career with a 115–33 win–loss record in singles and 49–32 win–loss record in doubles. He recorded victories over many future stars such as Lucas Pouille and Kyle Edmund.

== Career ==
=== 2011–13: ATP debut and first ATP win ===
Thiem turned pro in 2011, mainly competing in ITF Futures events and making his ATP main draw debut after he received wild cards to the main draw of Kitzbühel, Bangkok and Vienna. In Vienna, Thiem recorded his first ATP win over compatriot Thomas Muster, a former world No. 1 who had come back from retirement in 2010 after an 11-year break, before losing to Steve Darcis in the second round. As of February 2026 it is the largest age gap matchup in ATP Tour history (25 years and 11 months). In 2012, Thiem continued to compete mainly at Futures level, going 34–15 in matches with three titles. He received a wild card to Vienna for a second time, defeating Lukáš Lacko, before losing to Marinko Matosevic in the second round.

In 2013 Thiem competed in Futures and ATP Challengers, while also receiving wild cards at ATP Tour level to his home events in Kitzbühel and Vienna. In Kitzbühel he made it through to the quarterfinals by defeating the fourth seed Jürgen Melzer in the second round. He lost in the quarterfinals to Albert Montañés in straight sets. At the Vienna Open, Thiem reached his second quarterfinal of the year losing to the top seed, Jo-Wilfried Tsonga, in a close three-set match.

=== 2014: First ATP final ===
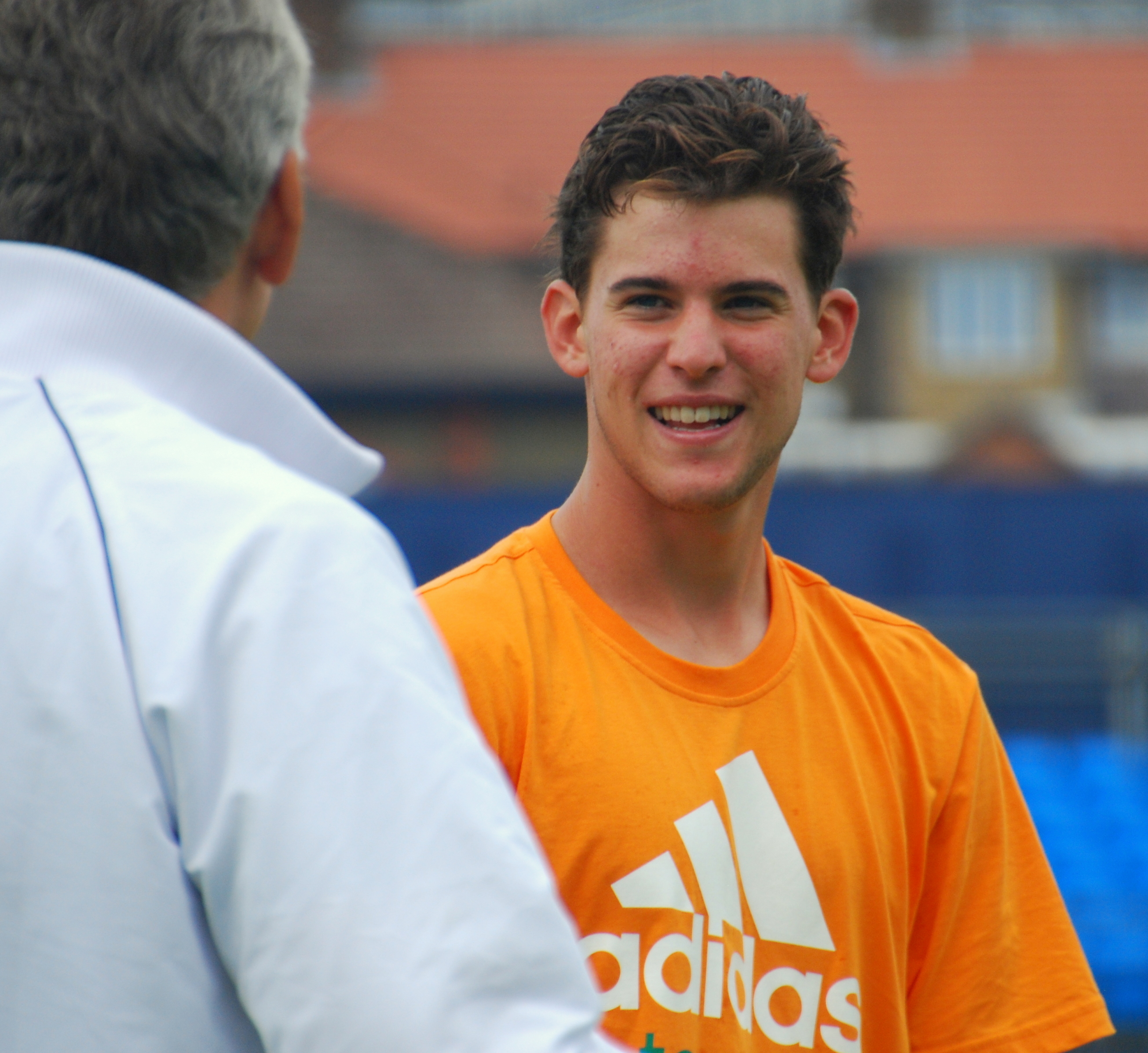
Thiem in 2014

Thiem entered the top 100 for the first time in 2014, and was the youngest player to end the year in the top 50, ranked 39, having started the year ranked 137. He spent the first half of the year entering qualifying for ATP Tour events, and was successful seven out of eight times. Thiem began the year at the Qatar Open by qualifying for the main draw, but lost to Peter Gojowczyk in the first round. At the Australian Open, Thiem qualified for a place in the main draw. He defeated João Sousa in four sets for his first main-draw victory at a Grand Slam tournament. He then lost to 19th seed Kevin Anderson in the second round. In February Thiem qualified for the Rotterdam Open, and in the second round of the main draw, he pushed Andy Murray to three sets, losing out in the third. At Indian Wells Thiem qualified for the main draw and defeated American Daniel Kosakowski in the first round at his first Masters 1000. He recorded his highest ranked win to date in the second round against the 21st seed, Gilles Simon, in straight sets. He lost in the next round to Julien Benneteau. The next week he succeeded in qualifying for the main draw at the Miami Open but lost to Tommy Robredo in the second round in a tight two setter. Thiem received a wild card for the main draw of the Monte-Carlo Masters. But he was defeated in the first round by Nicolas Mahut in three sets. The next week he went through qualifying for the main draw at the Barcelona Open. He beat Radek Štěpánek and Marcel Granollers, before losing to Santiago Giraldo in the third round.

At the Madrid Open, Thiem qualified for a main tour event for the seventh time in 2014. In the second round he had the biggest win of his career when he defeated the world No. 3, Stan Wawrinka, in three sets. Thiem started his campaign at the French Open by beating Frenchman Paul-Henri Mathieu in straight sets. In the second round he faced world No. 1 and the defending champion, Rafael Nadal, but was defeated in straight sets, only winning seven games in the process. Thiem suffered consecutive first-round losses on grass at the Queen's Club Championships in London, to David Goffin, and at the Wimbledon Championships to Australian qualifier Luke Saville.

After Wimbledon, Thiem played at the International German Open where he reached the third round before being defeated by Leonardo Mayer. Thiem was seeded at an ATP tournament for the first time in his career at the Swiss Open Gstaad. Seeded eighth, he lost in the first round to wild card Viktor Troicki. At the Austrian Open Kitzbühel Thiem was seeded fifth. In the semifinal he beat Juan Mónaco to reach his first ATP Tour 250 final at the age of 20. In the final, he fell to David Goffin despite being a set up. Competing in his first ever US Open in 2014, Thiem reached the fourth round defeating 11th seed Ernests Gulbis, and 19th seed Feliciano López, before losing to sixth seed Tomáš Berdych. At the end of the 2014 season Thiem completed four weeks of mandatory national service with the Austrian military.

=== 2015: Three ATP titles ===
Thiem had a slow start to the year, going 3–6 in matches before he reached his first Masters 1000 quarterfinals at the Miami Open. Thiem was defeated in the first round of the Australian Open to Roberto Bautista Agut. At Rotterdam he beat Ernests Gulbis but fell to Sergiy Stakhovsky in the second round. At the Open 13 in Marseille, he defeated João Sousa and David Goffin to reach the quarterfinals, where he was beaten by Bautista Agut. The Austrian reached the quarterfinals at the Miami Open losing to Andy Murray in three sets. At the Rome Masters he won over Gilles Simon to reach the third round, where he was defeated by Stan Wawrinka. Thiem won his first career ATP Tour title in Nice, France, defeating Nick Kyrgios, Ernests Gulbis and John Isner en route, winning a close three-setter against Argentina's Leonardo Mayer in the final. At the French Open, Thiem defeated Aljaž Bedene to progress to the second round, where he was defeated by 21st seed Pablo Cuevas in four close sets.

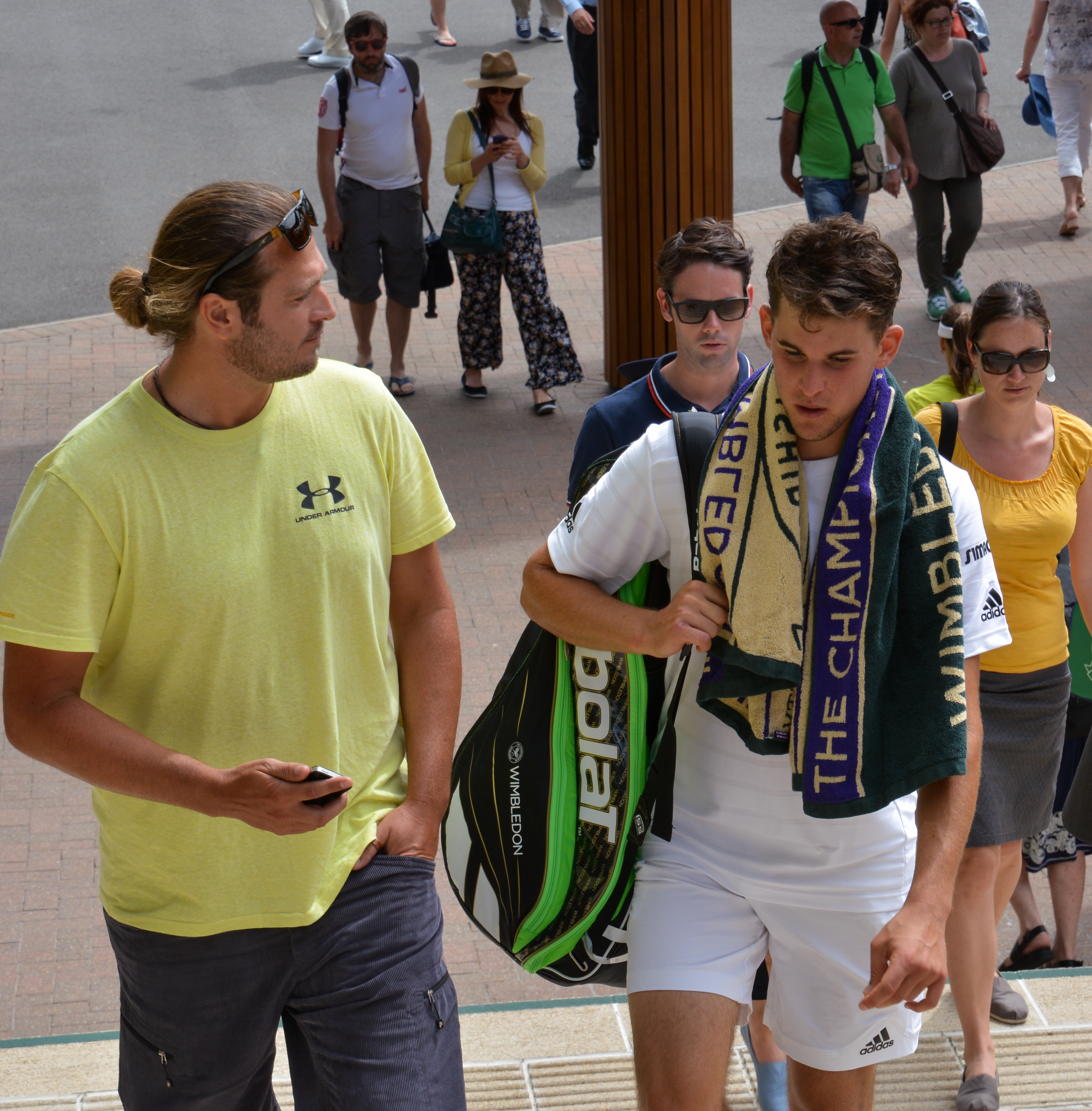
Thiem at the 2015 Wimbledon Championships

Thiem entered the Nottingham Open as the seventh seed, he defeated Malek Jaziri to claim his first win on grass in 2015, but was knocked out in the third round by Alexandr Dolgopolov. Thiem competed at the third Grand Slam of the year, the Wimbledon Championships as the 32nd seed, marking the first time he had been seeded at a Grand Slam tournament. He defeated Israel's Dudi Sela in four sets, marking his first ever win at Wimbledon. In the second round, Thiem lost a close five-setter against Fernando Verdasco, despite being 2–1 up in sets. After Wimbledon, he participated at the Croatia Open Umag as the fourth seed, which gave him a bye into the second round. After wins over Dušan Lajović and compatriot Andreas Haider-Maurer (after both players retired), Thiem advanced to the semifinals, where he defeated Gaël Monfils and earned himself a place in his third career final. In the final, he defeated Portugal's João Sousa in straight sets to claim his second career ATP Tour title. A week later Thiem won his third title at the Swiss Open Gstaad, beating David Goffin in the final, winning back to back tournaments for the first time.

Thiem next played at his home tournament, the Generali Open Kitzbühel, as the first seed which marked the first time he entered an ATP tournament as the top seeded player. After receiving a bye, he managed to avoid an early exit, as he gained a close three set win against Andreas Haider-Maurer. He defeated Albert Montañés in the quarterfinals, after Montañés retired five games into the second set. In the semifinals he was denied a place in his third consecutive final when he lost to German Philipp Kohlschreiber, which ended his winning streak of ten matches. After the tournament ended, Thiem entered the top 20 for the first time, reaching a new career high of world No. 18.

=== 2016: First Grand Slam semifinal and top 10 debut ===
Thiem won four titles in 2016, including a first at the ATP 500 level at Acapulco, and reached the French Open semifinals, the first time he had progressed past the fourth round at the Grand Slam level. Thiem started the year with a semifinal run in Brisbane on outdoor hard courts, beating world No. 13 Marin Čilić, but losing to Roger Federer in straight sets. Thiem reached the third round of the Australian Open, losing to world No. 16, David Goffin, in four sets. Thiem next competed at the Argentina Open, where he was seeded fifth. In the semifinals he upset world No. 5 and defending champion Rafael Nadal in three sets. Thiem went on to win his fourth ATP title by defeating Nicolás Almagro in three sets.

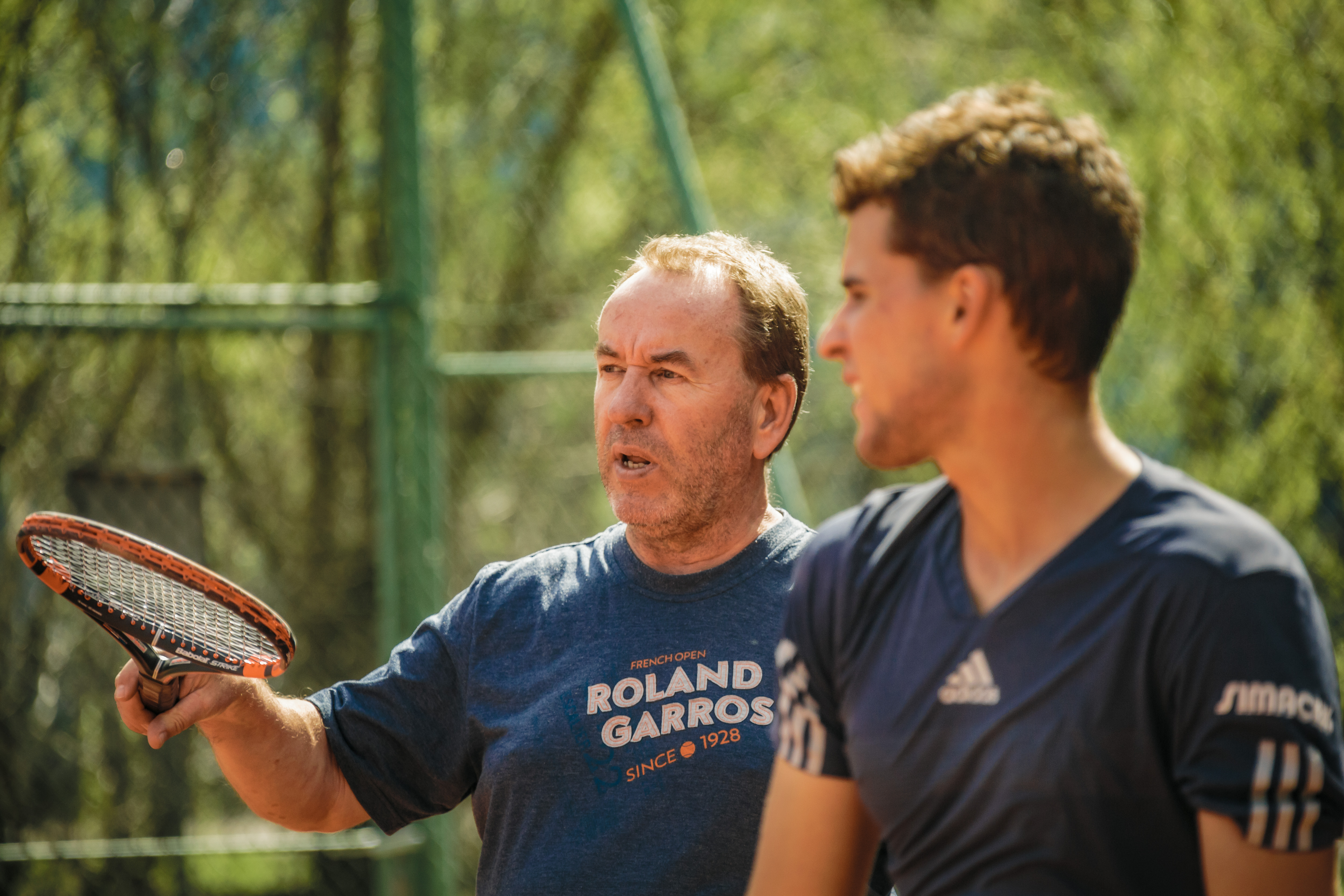
Dominic Thiem with coach Günter Bresnik, 2016

His next tournament was the Rio Open. Thiem reached the quarterfinals where he defeated David Ferrer, his second top-ten win in two weeks. He was defeated by Guido Pella in the semifinals, displaying signs of fatigue during the match. In February, Thiem won the Mexican Open in Acapulco, his first hard court title. He defeated Bernard Tomic in the final. With this win, Thiem attained a career-high ranking of 14 on 29 February, also rising to No. 3 in the Race to London. In early March, Thiem participated in Austria's Davis Cup Group I first-round tie versus Portugal on indoor hard courts. In singles, he defeated Gastão Elias in a fifth set tiebreak. Partnering Alexander Peya, he also beat Elias and João Sousa in doubles. In reverse singles, Thiem defeated Sousa to give Austria a 3–1 lead, and the team went on to win the tie by 4 rubbers to 1.

Thiem competed at Indian Wells where he reached the fourth round before falling to world No. 9, Jo-Wilfried Tsonga. In March, at the Miami Open he reached the fourth round succumbing to world No. 1 Novak Djokovic. Thiem then played at the Monte-Carlo Masters losing to Rafael Nadal in the third round. In late April, Thiem reached the ATP 250 final in Munich on outdoor clay, he played Philipp Kohlschreiber ultimately losing in three sets. Thiem lost in the first round of the Madrid Open before he competed in the Italian Open. He defeated Roger Federer, who was suffering from a back injury, in straight sets. In the quarterfinals, Thiem lost to sixth seed Kei Nishikori. In Nice, Thiem successfully defended his title, beating Alexander Zverev in the final. At the French Open, Thiem reached the semifinals of a major for the first time by defeating David Goffin in the quarterfinals. He lost to No. 1 and eventual champion Novak Djokovic in the semifinals. By reaching this semifinal he also made his debut inside the top ten of ATP rankings as world No. 7.

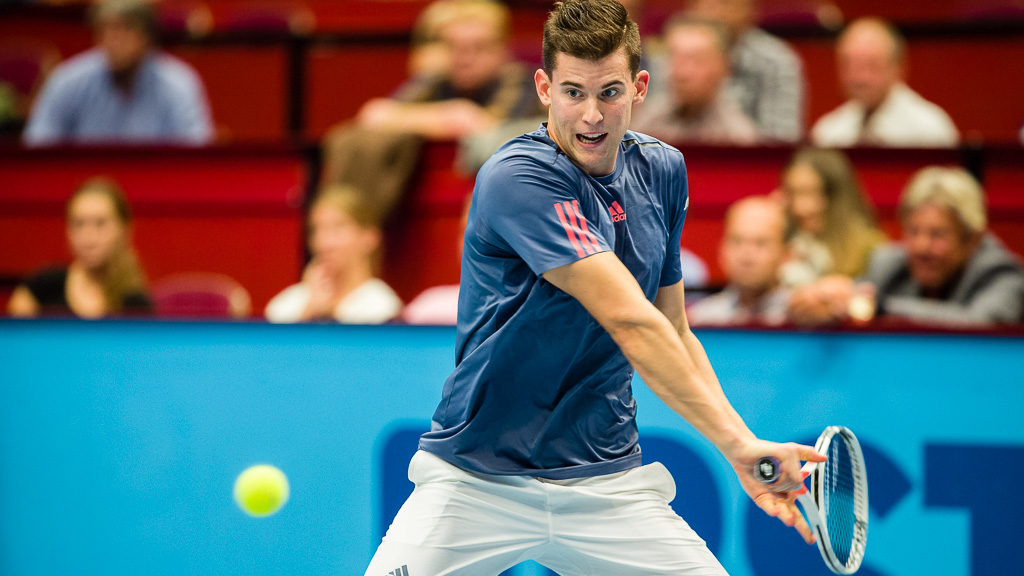
Thiem at 2016 Erste Bank Open

In early June, Thiem competed at the Stuttgart Open as the third seed. He defeated first seed Roger Federer in the semifinal. In the final, he defeated Philipp Kohlschreiber over two days to win his first grass court tournament. With the win he became the 29th player in Open Era history (since May 1968) to win ATP titles on three different surfaces in the same year. Thiem next competed at the Halle Open where he lost to Florian Mayer in the semifinal. At Wimbledon, in the first round Thiem again encountered Florian Mayer, but this time he won. In the second round, Thiem was defeated by Jiří Veselý. At the US Open, Thiem beat Pablo Carreño Busta to reach the fourth round, where he retired against Juan Martín del Potro due to right knee injury. After the US Open, Thiem reached the final at the Moselle Open but lost to Lucas Pouille. Thiem qualified for the ATP Finals for the first time losing his opening match to Novak Djokovic before he scored a win against Gaël Monfils. He was eliminated in the round robin stage following a loss to Milos Raonic. He ended the year ranked No. 8, his first time finishing inside the top ten.

=== 2017: First Masters 1000 final and world No. 4 ===
Thiem improved his Grand Slam results in 2017, reaching the fourth round in all four, and a second consecutive semifinal at the French Open. Thiem began the year by playing at the Brisbane International, losing in the quarterfinals against eventual winner Grigor Dimitrov. Thiem then played at the Sydney International as the top seed. Thiem overcame Gastao Elias but lost in the quarterfinals to Dan Evans. At the Australian Open, Thiem advanced to the fourth round for the first time, but lost to Goffin for the second year in a row. Thiem went to the Rotterdam Open for the first ATP 500 event of the year. After defeating Alexander Zverev and Gilles Simon, Thiem lost in the quarterfinals to Pierre-Hugues Herbert. The following week, Thiem was again the second seed at an ATP 500 event, this time at the Rio Open. Thiem claimed his first title since June, defeating Pablo Carreño Busta in the final. This was Thiem's eighth ATP Tour title, his sixth on clay, and his second at the 500 level. Thiem played in his third consecutive ATP 500 event at the Mexican Open in Acapulco, where he was the defending champion. Seeded fourth, Thiem lost in the quarterfinals to Sam Querrey, who eventually won the tournament.

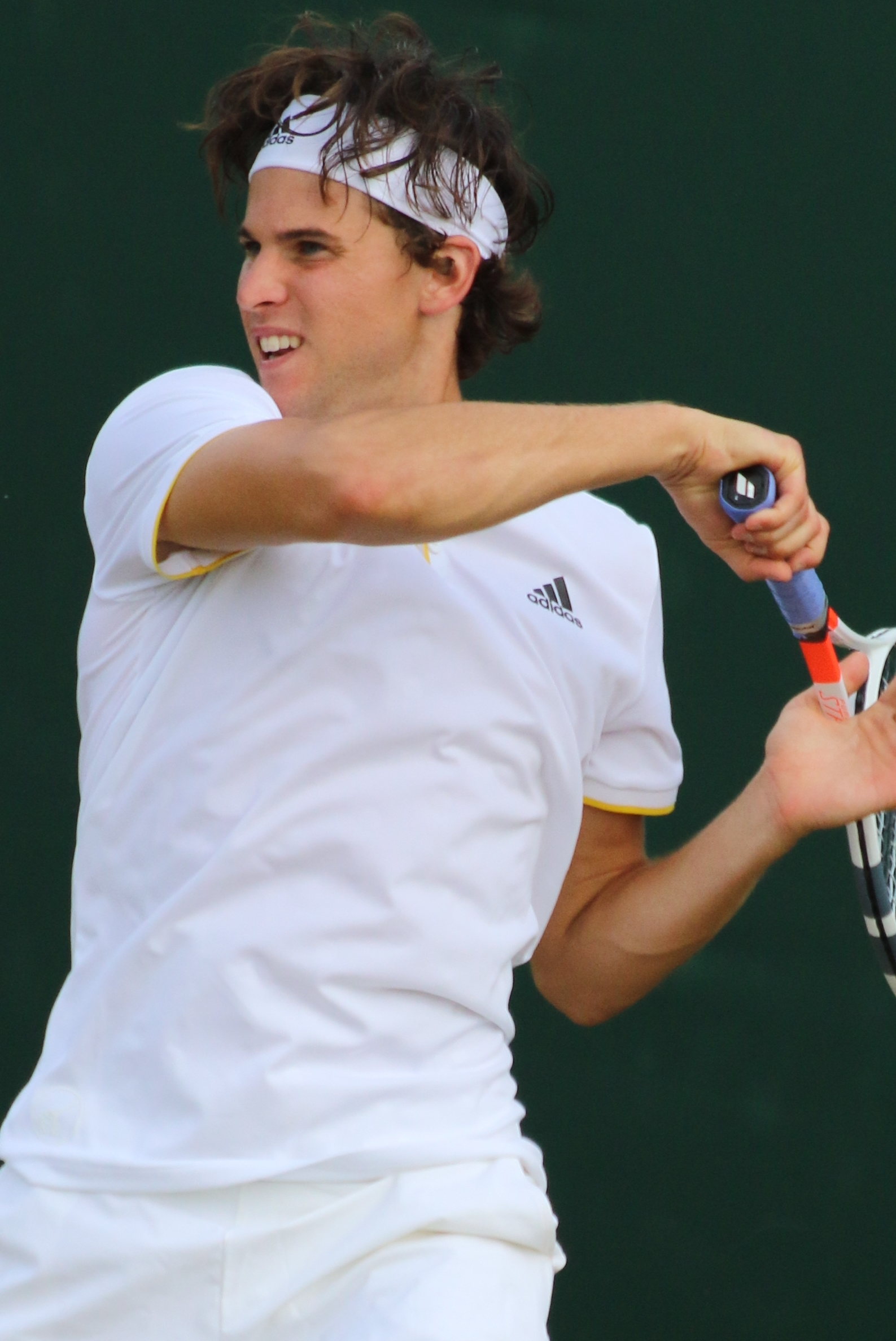
Thiem at the 2017 Wimbledon Championships

At the quarterfinals of the Indian Wells Masters he met Stan Wawrinka, losing a final set tiebreak. After losing his opening round match in Miami to Borna Ćorić, and a second round exit in Monte Carlo to David Goffin, he made his 12th ATP Tour final in Barcelona losing to Rafael Nadal in two sets. En route he scored his first win over a current world No. 1, beating Andy Murray in the semifinals. At the Madrid Open, Thiem reached his first Masters 1000 final against Rafael Nadal. Thiem lost but showed an improvement over his Barcelona Open scores against Nadal. Thiem defeated Nadal in the quarterfinals of the Rome Masters 1000 tournament in two straight sets, before falling to Novak Djokovic in the semifinals. At the French Open, Thiem did not drop a set in his first five matches including defeating defending champion Novak Djokovic before losing in the semifinal to eventual champion Rafael Nadal in straight sets.

At the beginning of the grass court season, Thiem reached the second round of the Halle Open, losing to Robin Haase. Then, in the second round of the Antalya Open, he was upset by qualifier Ramkumar Ramanathan, then ranked 222 in the world. At Wimbledon, he reached the fourth round for the first time in his career, losing out to eventual semifinalist Tomáš Berdych in five sets. Thiem then participated in the Washington Open, where he lost to Kevin Anderson in the third round. At the Canadian Open in Montreal, he received a bye into the second round, but lost to Diego Schwartzman. He then reached the quarterfinals of Cincinnati, where he lost to David Ferrer. At the US Open, Thiem made it to the fourth round against 2009 US Open champion Juan Martín del Potro, he eventually lost in five sets, after failing to capitalize on two match points in the fourth set. Thiem again struggled with form following the US Open, losing three straight matches in Chengdu, Tokyo and Shanghai. Nonetheless, he qualified for the ATP Finals for the second straight year. Thiem then lost his second match in both Vienna and Paris to Richard Gasquet and Fernando Verdasco successively. Thiem broke into the top five in the rankings for the first time in his career, rising to world No. 4. During the round robin stage of the ATP Finals, Thiem defeated Pablo Carreño Busta in three sets, but lost to David Goffin and Grigor Dimitrov. He did not advance to the semifinals.

=== 2018: First major final ===
Thiem reached a first Grand Slam final at the French Open, and a first US Open quarterfinal in 2018, along with a second Masters 1000 final in Madrid. In late December 2017, coach Galo Blanco was added to Thiem's team and they worked together until the end of the tennis season. Thiem began his season at the Qatar Open as the top seed. He reached the semifinals where he withdrew from his match against Gaël Monfils due to illness. At the Australian Open, Thiem lost in the fourth round against Tennys Sandgren. This was equal to his result of the previous year at the Australian Open. Thiem's next tournament in mid-February saw him win his ninth ATP Tour title at the Argentina Open, his second in Buenos Aires. This was his first title in nearly a year. In Indian Wells, he won his second round match against Stefanos Tsitsipas. In his third-round match against Pablo Cuevas, he rolled his ankle in winning in the first set, later retiring from the match. He skipped Miami because of the hairline fracture ankle injury.

Thiem next played in Monte Carlo, losing to Rafael Nadal in the quarterfinals. In Barcelona, he again advanced to the quarterfinals, before falling to Stefanos Tsitsipas. In Madrid, he faced Nadal in the quarterfinals. This time, he came through to win, ending Nadal's 21-match and record 50-set winning streak on clay. Thiem had been the last man to win against Nadal on clay the previous year in Rome. Thiem then defeated Kevin Anderson to reach the final where he lost to Alexander Zverev in straight sets. Thiem was the sixth seed at Rome, but lost his first match to Fabio Fognini in three sets. Thiem then played in Lyon, where he came back from a set and a break down against Gilles Simon to win his 10th ATP title. At the French Open, Thiem faced Alexander Zverev in the quarterfinals, defeating him in straight sets. In his third consecutive French Open semifinal, Thiem defeated unseeded Marco Cecchinato to advance to his first Grand Slam final. He then lost in straight sets in the final to Rafael Nadal.

Thiem lost to Stefanos Tsitsipas in his first match at the Canadian Open, and was forced to withdraw from Cincinnati due to illness. At the US Open, he reached the fourth round for the third consecutive year. There, he faced 2017 finalist Kevin Anderson, defeating him in straight sets to reach his first Grand Slam quarterfinal on hard court, where he faced top seed Nadal. This was their first meeting on a surface other than clay. In a surprising one-sided start to the match, Thiem won the first set, yielding only seven points. Nadal took control and won the second and third sets. Thiem then won the fourth set in a tiebreak. Nadal won the fifth set tiebreak to bring the match to an end at 2:04 AM local time, after 4 hours and 49 minutes of play. Later that month, Thiem claimed a title at the St Petersburg Open. He defeated Martin Kližan to secure his ninth ATP 250 title. At the Shanghai Masters, Thiem was upset by unseeded Matthew Ebden in his first match. Thiem was the top seed at the Vienna Open, advancing to the quarterfinals where he lost to Kei Nishikori. Then at the Paris Masters, Thiem was seeded sixth, reaching the semifinals before losing to eventual champion Karen Khachanov. At the ATP Finals, Thiem was eliminated in the group stage after winning one match, against Kei Nishikori, and losing his two others, against Kevin Anderson and Roger Federer. He ended the 2018 season ranked world No. 8.

=== 2019: Masters 1000 title, Major final, ATP Finals runner-up ===
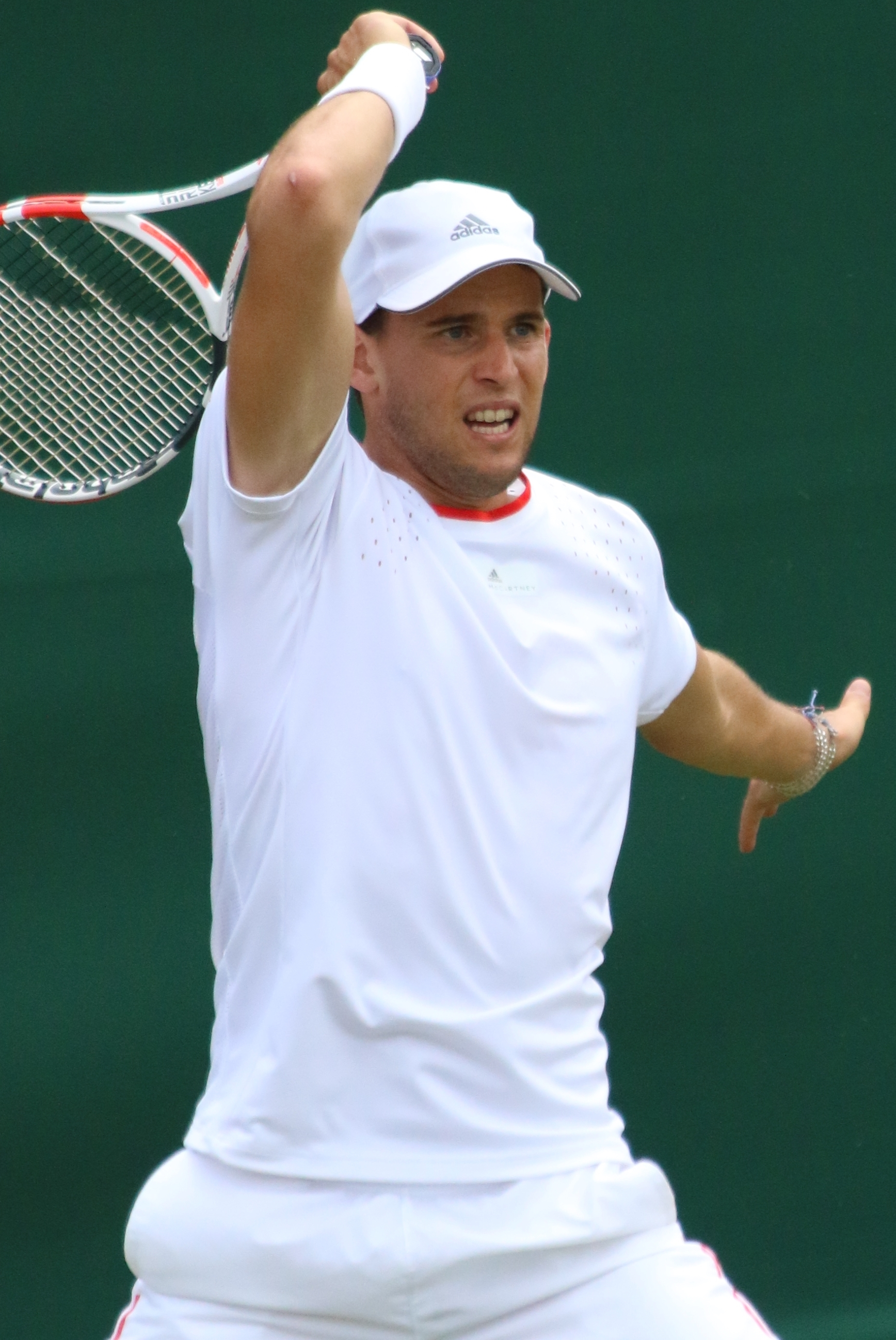
Thiem at the 2019 Wimbledon Championships

Thiem won five titles in 2019, tying with Novak Djokovic for the Tour lead. Thiem started his season at the Qatar Open, but was upset in the first round by Pierre-Hugues Herbert. At the Australian Open, he defeated Benoît Paire in five sets before retiring to Alexei Popyrin in the second round. He failed to defend his title in Buenos Aires and was knocked out of the Rio Open by Laslo Djere. At the Indian Wells Masters, he defeated Ivo Karlovic, got a walkover through Gael Monfils, and beat Milos Raonic en route to the final, where he defeated Roger Federer in three sets to claim his first ATP Masters 1000 title. As a result, he returned to his career-best ranking of world No. 4. Nicolás Massú was a new addition to Thiem's coaching team a month before the Indian Wells tournament.

At the Monte Carlo Masters he lost to eventual finalist Dušan Lajović in the third round. Thiem next went to Barcelona, where he captured his third career ATP 500 title. En route to the title, Thiem did not drop a set, including in his win over eleven-time champion Rafael Nadal in the semifinal, his fourth win on clay over the Spaniard. Thiem defeated Daniil Medvedev in straight sets in the final. Just prior to the French Open Thiem parted with long time coach and manager Günter Bresnik, who he had been working with for 15 years. Thiem was seeded fourth at the French Open and reached his fourth consecutive semifinal at the tournament where he faced world No. 1, Novak Djokovic. In a four-hour match stretching over two days, Thiem defeated Djokovic in five sets, advancing to his second major final. In the final, he again faced Rafael Nadal. After splitting the competitive first two sets, Nadal won the third and fourth sets to take the match.

At Wimbledon, Thiem lost in the first round to Sam Querrey. Thiem played in Hamburg, losing in the quarterfinals to Andrey Rublev. The following week he won the 14th title of his career in Kitzbühel defeating Albert Ramos Viñolas in the final. At the US Open he lost to Thomas Fabbiano in the first round in four sets, his second first-round Grand Slam loss in a row. At the China Open, Thiem defeated Andy Murray in straight sets to progress to the semifinals, where he defeated Karen Khachanov after being down a set and a break and coming back to win in three sets. With this win he qualified for the ATP Finals. In the final Thiem defeated Stefanos Tsitsipas to win his first title in Asia, fourth title in 2019 and 15th career title. At the Shanghai Masters Thiem reached the quarterfinals before being bested by Matteo Berrettini. For the first time in ten attempts, Thiem made past the quarterfinal stage at his home tournament in Vienna. He reached the final where he triumphed over Diego Schwartzman to claim the Vienna Open trophy, for his 16th career title.

At the ATP Finals, Thiem defeated Roger Federer and Novak Djokovic in consecutive matches, and became the first player to qualify for the semifinals. It was Thiem's first win over Djokovic on hard court. Thiem then defeated Alexander Zverev in straight sets to reach the final where he lost to Stefanos Tsitsipas in three sets.

=== 2020: Major title at the US Open, World No. 3, 300th win ===
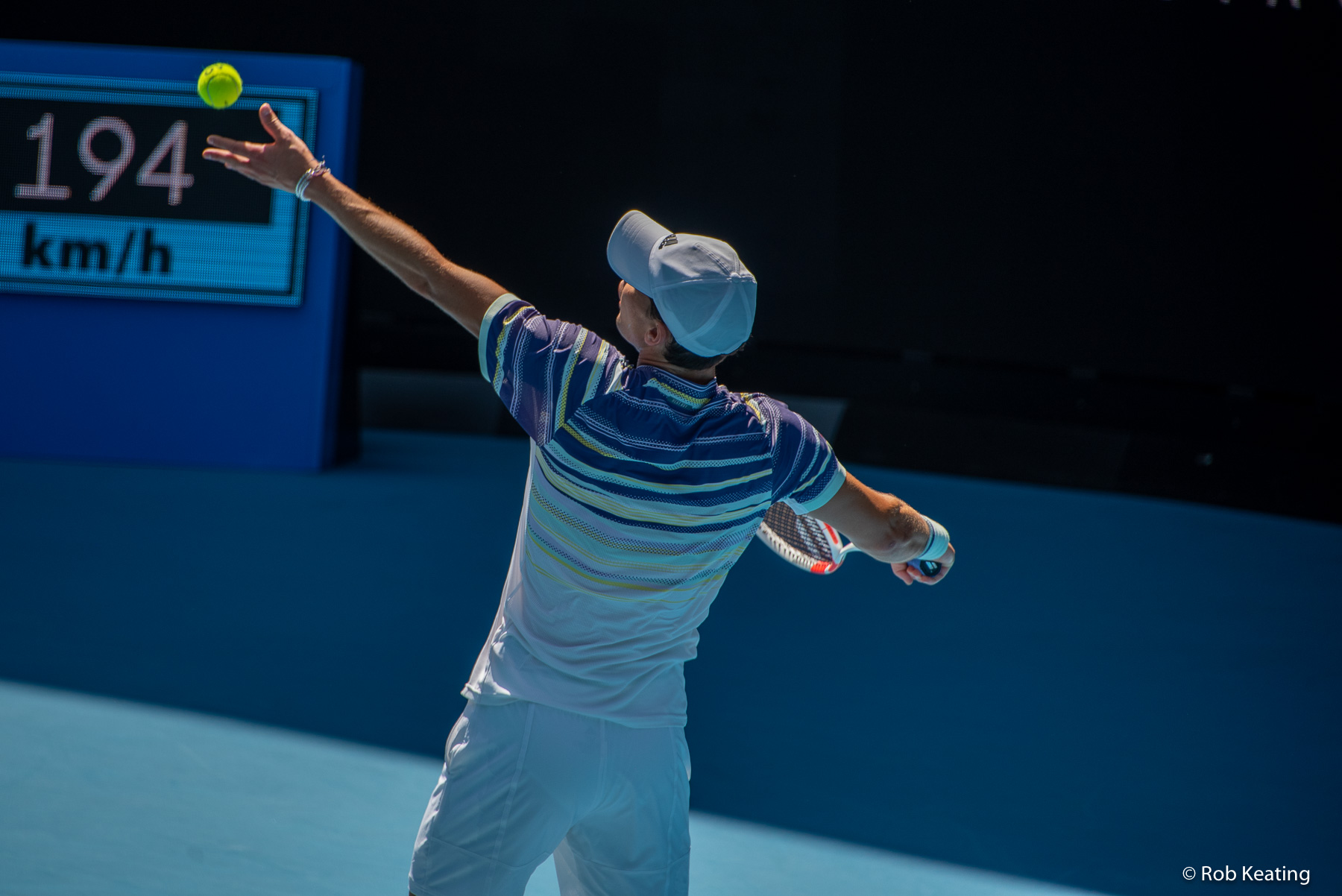
Thiem at the 2020 Australian Open

In a curtailed season due to the COVID-19 pandemic, Thiem posted his best results at Grand Slam tournaments. He began his 2020 season at the inaugural ATP Cup, where Austria was defeated in the group stage. He played three matches, defeating Diego Schwartzman but losing to Borna Ćorić and Hubert Hurkacz. Seeded fifth at the Australian Open, Thiem reached his first quarterfinals there where he faced world No. 1 and top seed Rafael Nadal in just their second match on hard court. He defeated Nadal in four sets, winning three tiebreaks, proceeding to the semifinals. He then defeated seventh seed Alexander Zverev in four sets to make his first Grand Slam final on hard courts. In the final, Thiem lost to defending champion Novak Djokovic in five sets despite holding a two sets to one lead.

On March 2, Thiem rose to a new career high ranking of world No. 3, passing Roger Federer in the ATP rankings. Thiem arrived early at Indian Wells to defend his 2019 title. However, amid the rising threat of COVID-19, the BNP Paribas Open was postponed. Shortly afterward the ATP Tour was suspended until July. During the ATP Tour's suspension Thiem competed in several exhibition events. He won the first leg of the Adria Tour exhibition event in Belgrade, the Bett1 Aces event in Berlin, the Austrian Pro Series event and reached the final of his own exhibition event, Thiem's 7. Upon the tour's resumption in August, at the Cincinnati Masters in New York, Thiem lost his opening match to Filip Krajinović.

Thiem was the second seed in the men's singles draw at the 2020 US Open. In the third round, he defeated 2014 champion Marin Čilić in four sets. He went on to beat Félix Auger-Aliassime in the fourth round in straight sets. He beat Alex de Minaur in the quarterfinals in straight sets, following which he defeated third seed Daniil Medvedev in three sets in the semifinals to reach his first US Open final. He defeated Alexander Zverev in the final to win his first major title, the first time since the 2004 French Open that a player had come back from losing the first two sets in a Grand Slam final to win the title. This was the fifth time a player has come back from two sets down in the open era. Thiem became the first male tennis player born in the 1990s to win a major title. Thiem additionally became the first new Grand Slam champion in the men's singles since Marin Čilić won the 2014 US Open.

Thiem was seeded third at the French Open. He reached the quarterfinals where he was defeated by Diego Schwartzman in a five-set match which took five hours and eight minutes to complete. Thiem then played as the defending champion at the Vienna Open but lost in the quarterfinals to Andrey Rublev in straight sets.

At the ATP Finals, Thiem was drawn with Stefanos Tsitsipas, Rafael Nadal, and Andrey Rublev. He beat Tsitsipas in a rematch of the previous year's final. He then defeated Nadal in two tiebreaks guaranteeing him passage to the semifinals. He beat Novak Djokovic in the semifinals, recording his 300th match win and his fifth against a world No. 1, but lost the finals to Daniil Medvedev in three sets. After a breakthrough year and winning his a Grand Slam, Thiem was awarded the Austrian Sportsman of the Year award which was presented at the Lottery Sports Aid Gala. Sports Illustrated (SI) declared Dominic Thiem as Winner of Tennis MVP award for the year 2020.

=== 2021: Form struggles and wrist injury ===
Thiem began the 2021 season at the ATP Cup, where Austria was defeated in the group stage. Thiem lost his opener to Matteo Berrettini, and was a set up when Benoit Paire had to retire due to injury in his second match. At the Australian Open Thiem reached the fourth round by defeating Nick Kyrgios, coming back from two sets down to win in five sets. In the fourth round he was defeated by Grigor Dimitrov in straight sets. Thiem's next tournament was Doha, where he beat Aslan Karatsev in three sets before losing to Roberto Bautista Agut. He then lost in the first round of Dubai to Lloyd Harris.

Following these losses Thiem took a break to "recharge" and recover from a knee injury. His first tournament back was the Madrid Open, where he reached the semifinals by defeating Marcos Giron, Alex de Minaur and John Isner before losing to Alexander Zverev in straight sets. At the Italian Open, Thiem beat Marton Fucsovics before falling to Lorenzo Sonego in the third round. In Lyon, Thiem lost his opening match to Cameron Norrie. At the French Open, Thiem lost in the first round to Pablo Andújar in five sets, despite being 2 sets up.

On June 17, due to his struggling form, Thiem announced his withdrawal from the Tokyo Olympics. Up (5–2) against Adrian Mannarino in the Mallorca Championships, Thiem suffered a right wrist injury, forcing him to retire, which also led him to withdraw from the 2021 Wimbledon Championships. On August 18, Thiem announced he was withdrawing for the remainder of the 2021 season due to his wrist injury.

=== 2022: Out of Top 300, comeback wins, back to top 100 ===
Thiem was due to play in the Mubadala World Tennis Championship, but withdrew for recovery purposes. He also withdrew from the Australian Open citing recovery reasons. He was then set to make his return to the tour at the Córdoba Open in February, but withdrew due to a right finger injury. Thiem announced that he planned to return to the tour in March. Despite this, he withdrew from both the Indian Wells and Miami Open, citing recovery once again. He announced plans to return for the European clay court swing.

At the Marbella Challenger in March, Thiem returned to professional tennis. However, in the first round, he lost in straight sets to Argentine Pedro Cachin in his first match back after 7 months. After this match, Thiem tested positive for COVID-19. As a result, on April 7, his spokesperson confirmed that Thiem had pulled out of the upcoming ATP Masters tournament in Monte Carlo and would return home to Austria.

Unable to defend his semifinal points from 2021 at the Mutua Madrid Open following a first round loss to Andy Murray, he fell out of the top 150 in the rankings. At the French Open, Thiem lost in straight sets in the first round to Hugo Dellien, and subsequently fell out of the top 300.

Thiem recorded his first victory at any level in 14 months by beating Filip Misolic at the Salzburg Open, a challenger in Austria. He recorded his first ATP win a week later at the Swedish Open defeating Emil Ruusuvuori in the first round. He then defeated Roberto Bautista Agut, before losing to Sebastián Báez in the quarterfinals. The following week, Thiem made his first ATP Tour level semifinal at the Swiss Open Gstaad since the 2021 Madrid Open by beating 7th seed Hugo Gaston, Federico Delbonis and Juan Pablo Varillas before losing to second seed Matteo Berrettini in the semifinals. At his home tournament in Kitzbühel Thiem reached the quarterfinals for the third week in a row defeating Alexander Shevchenko and Sebastian Ofner before losing to Yannick Hanfmann.

After withdrawing from the Western & Southern Open due to illness, Thiem played at the Winston-Salem Open reaching the third round defeating J. J. Wolf and Grigor Dimitrov before losing to Jack Draper. At the US Open as a wildcard, he lost in the first round to Pablo Carreño Busta of Spain in four sets. Following the US Open, he made the final at the Challenger in Rennes, France, beating Gilles Simon, Ryan Peniston, Adrian Andreev, and Hugo Gaston, losing to former top 25 player Ugo Humbert. At the Gijón Open he reached the semifinals of an ATP tournament for the second time in the season (after Gstaad) defeating fourth seed Francisco Cerundolo. He lost to top seed Andrey Rublev in straight sets. As a result, he climbed more than 30 positions up into the top 150 in the singles rankings to No. 132. He also reached the semifinals at the European Open in Antwerp defeating Hubert Hurkacz. He lost to Sebastian Korda in three tight sets. He improved close to 20 positions in the rankings to No. 113 becoming Austrian No. 1 again. At his home tournament, the Erste Bank Open in Vienna he defeated Tommy Paul in a tight three-set match with two tiebreaks saving two match points in the process. He lost to top seed Daniil Medvedev in straight sets. He returned to the top 100 on 31 October 2022, ending his 2022 season.

=== 2023: First ATP final in three years ===
Thiem started his season at the Adelaide International in Australia, where he lost to top qualifying seed Kwon Soon-woo in the qualifier stage. At the Australian Open, he fell to fifth seed Andrey Rublev in straight sets in the first round. During the South American clay court swing, he earned his first win of the season in the Argentina Open over Alex Molcan, but fell to Juan Pablo Varillas in the second round. At the Rio Open and Chile Open, he suffered successive first round exits. In the US Sunshine double, he battled Adrian Mannarino at the Indian Wells Masters, losing in three sets. At the Miami Open, he fell to Lorenzo Sonego in straight sets, marking a five match losing streak.

Thiem started off the European clay court season at the Estoril Open, reaching just a second quarterfinal in six months. He defeated Sebastian Ofner and Ben Shelton before losing to Quentin Halys. At the Bavarian International Tennis Championships, Thiem defeated Constant Lestienne and Marc-Andrea Hüsler to reach the second quarterfinal of the season, where he lost to Taylor Fritz in straight sets. In the Challenger tournament in Mauthausen, Thiem was the favourite to win the title and reached his third quarterfinal of the season. After defeating Dino Prizmic, he fell to the young Serbian Hamad Medjedovic in straight sets in the semifinals. In the next Challenger in Bordeaux where he entered as an alternate, he defeated Benoît Paire. Thiem began his grass season at the Halle Open, but fell to Alexander Zverev in straight sets. Next, at the Wimbledon Championships, he faced Stefanos Tsitsipas in the first round, but lost in five close sets.

At the Austrian Open in Kitzbühel on home soil, Thiem defeated Facundo Bagnis, Zhang Zhizhen, and Arthur Rinderknech to set up a semifinal clash with Laslo Djere. He saved five match points en route to his first tour-level final since the 2020 ATP Finals. He lost in straight sets to Sebastian Baez. As a result of his performance, he moved back into the top 100. He retired in the second round at the US Open against Ben Shelton and lost in the first round at the Vienna Open where he received a wildcard. Ranked No. 108, he qualified for the last Masters of the season in Paris and defeated Stan Wawrinka in a match that finished close to 2:30AM, his first Masters win since Madrid before losing to Holger Rune. He finished 2023 in Metz, winning his opening match against Matteo Martineau, but losing his next match to 4th seed Ugo Humbert.

=== 2024: Final year ===
In 2024, Thiem muscled through his qualifying matches in Brisbane, narrowly defeating James McCabe and Giulio Zeppieri in three sets. In the main draw, he was matched against Rafael Nadal, who was making his comeback after a year's hiatus from the sport due to injury. In their 16th meeting, Thiem was defeated in straight sets by Nadal. He continued the Australian season by playing at the exhibition tournament in Kooyong, losing to Andy Murray but winning his match against Francisco Cerundolo, both in straight sets. He ended his Australian campaign in Melbourne, losing a 5-set, near 5-hour match against Felix Auger-Aliassime. At the end of January, Thiem separated from his coach, Benjamin Ebrahimzadeh.

In February, Thiem played for Austria at the World Group I play-offs in the Davis Cup, winning his singles match in straight sets against Michael Agwi. He then headed to Oslo for the UTS Tour, nicknamed 'Thieminho', appearing for the first time since 2020. He lost his matches against Alexander Bublik and Holger Rune, before withdrawing due to food poisoning. In March, he skipped the tournaments in the Sunshine Double and opted to compete at the ATP Challenger level instead, playing in Székesfehérvár and Zadar Challenger tournaments. In April, he was unable to qualify for Monte Carlo and Madrid, losing in the qualifying rounds to Roberto Bautista Agut and Thanasi Kokkinakis in the first and second qualifying rounds respectively. At the ATP 250 level, he scored his first ATP Tour-level win of the season in Estoril against Maximilian Marterer before losing in the second round to Richard Gasquet. In Munich, he lost in the first round to Alejandro Moro Cañas.

In May, Thiem announced his impending retirement after the Vienna Open in October. He made his final appearance in Roland Garros, losing in the second round of the qualifying tournament to Otto Virtanen. In the grass season, Thiem played in Mallorca for the second time, his first being the occasion on which he incurred his injury in 2021. He was defeated in the first round by Gaël Monfils, despite heading into the match with a 6–0 record against the Frenchman. Thiem skipped Wimbledon and entered at Gstaad where he lost in the first round to Juan Pablo Varillas. In Kitzbühel, where Thiem was defending finalist points from 2023, he lost in the first round to Thiago Agustín Tirante. He was later given a tribute celebration after the match.

At the US Open, Thiem was awarded a wildcard to make his final Grand Slam tournament appearance. He lost to Ben Shelton in straight sets in the first round. In his final match of his career, Thiem played Luciano Darderi in the first round of the Vienna Open, where he lost in straight sets.

== Rivalries ==
=== Thiem vs. Nadal ===
Thiem and Rafael Nadal met 16 times; Thiem trailed 6–10 (37%). The majority of their meetings were on clay. They first met in 2014 at Roland Garros with Nadal coming out the victor. Their next meeting was in 2016, this time in Buenos Aires and Thiem prevailed for his first win against Nadal. Thiem went on to beat Nadal once a year on clay for the next three years until 2019, joining Djokovic as one of two players to have defeated Nadal on clay four times or more. Thiem and Nadal have twice met in the French Open final in 2018 and 2019, both going Nadal's way, straight sets in 2018 and four sets the following year. Nadal said “He [was] the most difficult opponent,” of the 2019 championship.

Their hard court record was tied 2–2. Their first meeting on hard was one of their closest encounters, a four-hour 49 minute quarterfinal at the 2018 US Open. Thiem won the first set to love, before Nadal fought back to claim victory in a fifth set tiebreak, despite winning six fewer points during the match. The next meeting at the 2020 Australian Open quarterfinals went the other way, featuring 3 tiebreaks, Thiem defeating Nadal on hard court for the first time. In their first meeting on indoor hard court at the 2020 ATP Finals, Thiem won in two tight sets. In 2024, after narrowly winning his qualifying matches, Thiem drew Nadal in the first round of the Brisbane International, which marked Nadal's return to the sport after an almost year-long hiatus as well as the pair's first competitive match in 3 years. Thiem lost the match in straight sets.

=== Thiem vs. Djokovic ===
Thiem and Novak Djokovic met 12 times; Thiem trailed 5–7 (42%). Djokovic won their first five meetings from 2014 to 2017 before Thiem won his first match against him in the 2017 French Open quarterfinals. They split the next two matches they played, both at clay Masters in Monte Carlo and Madrid in 2018 and 2019 respectively. They met again at the French Open in 2019, this time in the semifinals. Thiem defeated Djokovic in a five set match over two days lasting four hours 13 minutes in very windy and showery conditions. Thiem also won their 2019 ATP Finals round robin match in a third set tiebreak, Djokovic praising him afterwards for his "courageous tennis". Meeting in the final of the 2020 Australian Open, they had another five set match, this time Djokovic prevailing for his eighth Australian Open title. Coming from 0–4 down in the final set tiebreak, Thiem won their semifinal meeting at the 2020 ATP Finals.

=== Thiem vs. Federer ===
Thiem and Roger Federer met 7 times, with Thiem winning 5 matches (71%). The pair split their first four meetings with Federer winning on hard court in Brisbane in 2016 and at the 2018 ATP Finals, and Thiem winning in 2016 on clay in Rome and on grass in Stuttgart. In 2019, the rivalry entered at two wins apiece and the pair played three times. First, in the Indian Wells championship match, Federer took the first set but Thiem came back to win in three sets for his first Masters 1000 title. Two months later, they played on clay at the Madrid Open, with Thiem winning again in three sets after losing the first, Thiem winning after saving two match points in the second set tiebreak. Their final match was contested at the 2019 ATP Finals round robin; Thiem again prevailed in two sets.

=== Thiem vs. Zverev ===
Thiem and Alexander Zverev met 12 times; Thiem leads 8–4 (66.67%). Thiem won their first three meetings, all in 2016 and on clay, including a first title fight in Nice before Zverev retaliated with a win on hard court in Beijing later in the year. In 2017, Thiem claimed their only meeting in Rotterdam. In 2018 they contested two matches, the first a Masters 1000 final at the Madrid Open, with Zverev taking his third Masters title in straight sets. The second was in the French Open quarterfinals, this time Thiem winning in straight sets. Thiem took their only encounter in 2019 at the Tour Finals, saving all four break point opportunities that Zverev created. In 2020 their rivalry took place on the biggest stages as they contested a Grand Slam semifinal at the Australian Open, and a final at the US Open. In Zverev's first semifinal and final appearances Thiem was the more experienced player and showed this in Melbourne, winning in four sets. In New York in September Zverev started the match confidently while Thiem was nervous, "I was so tight in the beginning," he said of the first two sets. However the dynamic changed, Thiem overcame his nerves to win the match in a fifth set tiebreak. At the 2021 Madrid Open, Zverev defeated Thiem in the semifinals in straight sets for the second time in Madrid. Their most recent encounter was at the 2023 Halle Open where Zverev defeated Thiem 6–3, 6–4 in straight sets.

== Playing style ==
Thiem was primarily an aggressive baseline player, adept at defending as well. His groundstrokes were solid on both wings, with a heavy forehand and a tenacious, powerful single-handed backhand. He was one of the few ATP players to use a single-handed backhand. According to Thiem, he changed to his single-handed backhand at the advice of his coach. His backhand effectively handled high bouncing balls, which are a big problem for many conventional single-handers. Thiem often used heavy, penetrating groundstrokes to construct points and outlast his opponents. He had a long take-back on both wings, and the top-spin he produces on his groundstrokes allowed him to both attack and defend well. Thiem also possesses a strong serve, capable of reaching 145 mph (233 km/h). He often returned serve from as far back as possible, which allowed him to take more time and prepare full swings at returns. Thiem improved his slice backhand, an important shot especially on low bouncing hard courts.

His deliberate yet aggressive playing style, particularly the long take-back on his groundstrokes, ability to sustain long baseline rallies and top-spin serves greatly benefited his clay game. The Roland Garros website described him as an "heir to the throne." He beat many high-ranked clay-court players on clay, recording four wins over Rafael Nadal on the surface. He defeated Nicolás Almagro and Nadal en route to his Argentina Open title, as well as Stan Wawrinka at the 2014 Madrid Open, Roger Federer at the 2016 Italian Open and the 2019 Madrid Open, and Novak Djokovic at the French Open both in 2017 and 2019. His mental game has also been praised, especially his tiebreak win percentage.

== Endorsements ==
Thiem has been represented by Herwig Straka since his split with former coach and manager Gunter Bresnik in May 2019. Thiem has been using Babolat rackets since 2014 and is the face of the Pure Strike line; he was involved in the testing and development of the 2019 version which he uses. Adidas is Thiem's apparel and footwear sponsor. Thiem is a Rolex Testimonee, and is sponsored by Kia, Sky Sport and Tecnogym.

Thiem has endorsed Red Bull since 2018, wearing a patch for them and often drinking the energy drink on court. He also participated in their 2020 charity Wings for Life World Run. Thiem is a brand ambassador for Bank Austria, and he has appeared in several advertising campaigns for the Austrian bank.

In August 2020, Thiem became a brand ambassador for Duravit, a bathroom manufacturer. In 2021 Thiem became a testimonee and partnered with Neoh, a low carbohydrate protein bar start up.

== Personal life ==
Thiem began dating fellow tennis player Kristina Mladenovic in 2017. They publicly confirmed their relationship in May 2018 and split up in November 2019. Thiem has been dating circus performer, socialite and Let's Dance winner Lili Paul-Roncalli since October 2020.

Thiem is a big fan of football and is a Chelsea supporter. He founded his own football club called 1.TFC Matzendorf in 2016, which consists of friends and fellow tennis players who come together a few times a year to play charity games. Thiem supports environmental causes, donating and raising awareness for 4ocean and the WWF. On ocean pollution he said "It's one of the biggest problems nowadays that we face, with all the plastic pollution. I love nature and I'm trying to support this whenever I can." Thiem was also part of his apparel sponsor Adidas' 2019 Parley tennis collection campaign, the clothing of the collection being made from recycled plastic waste collected from beaches and coastlines with the aim to raise awareness and help tackle marine pollution. In April 2021, Thiem appeared in a campaign for bee protection. The project, called Bio Bienen Apfel, aims to raise awareness about creating a habitat for bees in areas of Germany and Austria. Thiem founded another football team, Ecoballers FC, in Summer 2024.

== Career statistics ==
=== Singles performance timeline ===
Key
**W**	F	SF	QF	#R	RR	Q#	DNQ	A	NH

(W) winner; (F) finalist; (SF) semifinalist; (QF) quarterfinalist; (#R) rounds 4, 3, 2, 1; (RR) round-robin stage; (Q#) qualification round; (DNQ) did not qualify; (A) absent; (NH) not held; (SR) strike rate (events won / competed); (W–L) win–loss record.
To avoid confusion and double counting, these charts are updated at the conclusion of a tournament or when the player's participation has ended.

Tournament	2014	2015	2016	2017	2018	2019	2020	2021	2022	2023	2024	SR	W–L	Win %
Australian Open	2R	1R	3R	4R	4R	2R	F	4R	A	1R	1R	0 / 10	19–10	66%
French Open	2R	2R	SF	SF	F	F	QF	1R	1R	1R	Q2	0 / 10	28–10	74%
Wimbledon	1R	2R	2R	4R	1R	1R	NH	A	A	1R	A	0 / 7	5–7	42%
US Open	4R	3R	4R	4R	QF	1R	**W**	A	1R	2R	1R	1 / 10	23–9	72%
**Win–loss**	**5–4**	**4–4**	**11–4**	**14–4**	**13–4**	**7–4**	**17–2**	**3–2**	**0–2**	**1–4**	**0–2**	**1 / 37**	**75–36**	**68%**

=== Grand Slam tournament finals ===
==== Singles: 4 (1 title, 3 runners-up) ====
Result	Year	Tournament	Surface	Opponent	Score
Loss	2018	French Open	Clay	(Spain) Rafael Nadal	4–6, 3–6, 2–6
Loss	2019	French Open	Clay	(Spain) Rafael Nadal	3–6, 7–5, 1–6, 1–6
Loss	2020	Australian Open	Hard	(Serbia) Novak Djokovic	4–6, 6–4, 6–2, 3–6, 4–6
Win	2020	US Open	Hard	(Germany) Alexander Zverev	2–6, 4–6, 6–4, 6–3, 7–6^{(8–6)}

=== Year-end championship finals ===
==== Singles: 2 (2 runners-up) ====
Result	Year	Tournament	Surface	Opponent	Score
Loss	2019	ATP Finals, London	Hard (i)	(Greece) Stefanos Tsitsipas	7–6^{(8–6)}, 2–6, 6–7^{(4–7)}
Loss	2020	ATP Finals, London	Hard (i)	(Russia) Daniil Medvedev	6–4, 6–7^{(2–7)}, 4–6

Source(s): ITF Profile and ATP Profile

=== Records ===
==== Open Era records ====
- These records were attained in the Open Era of tennis.
- Records in **bold** indicate peer-less achievements.

Time span	Selected Grand Slam tournament records	Players matched
2011 Vienna Open	Largest age gap matchup in ATP Tour history	[[Thomas Muster]]
2020 US Open	First man born in the 1990s to win a slam.	**Stands alone**
2020 US Open	Won a US Open final from two sets down.	**Stands alone**
2020 US Open	Won a Grand Slam final from two sets down.	Björn Borg; Ivan Lendl; Andre Agassi; Gastón Gaudio; Novak Djokovic; Rafael Nadal; Jannik Sinner; Carlos Alcaraz

Awards
Preceded by (Canada) Félix Auger-Aliassime	Arthur Ashe Humanitarian of the Year; 2024	Succeeded by (Russia) Andrey Rublev
