= Austrian Open Kitzbühel =

Generali Open

ATP Tour
- Event name: Generali Open Kitzbühel
- Founded: 1894; 132 years ago
- Location: Kitzbühel; Austria
- Venue: Tennis Stadium Kitzbühel, Kitzbüheler Tennisclub (KTC)
- Category: ATP Tour 250 / ATP World Series (1990–1998, 2009, 2011–); ATP Challenger Tour (2010); ATP Championship Series / International Series Gold (1999–2008); Grand Prix Tour (1972–1989)
- Surface: Clay / outdoors
- Draw: 28S / 16D
- Prize money: €596,035 (2025)
- Website: generaliopen.com

Current champions (2026)
- Singles: (France) Quentin Halys
- Doubles: (Austria) Lucas Miedler (Australia) Marc Polmans

The Generali Open Kitzbühel and originally known as the Austrian International Championships, is an annual tennis tournament held in Kitzbühel, Austria since 1894, on clay courts.

== History ==
The men's tournament the Championships of Austria was established in 1894, and a women's event followed two years later in 1896, becoming a combined event. Following World War II it was known as the Austrian International Championships up to the Open Era in 1968.

The event was part of the ATP World Series from the creation of ATP World Tour in 1990 until 1998, International Series Gold from 1999 to 2008, and ATP World Tour 250 series in 2009. It was downgraded to the ATP Challenger Tour in 2010, replaced by the Open de Nice Côte d'Azur, before regaining top tour status in 2011 once again, as part of the ATP 250 series. It is the sixth oldest tennis tournament in the world. It was sponsored by Generali in 1994-2006 and sponsored again since 2015.

== Past finals ==
=== Singles ===
Year	Location	Champions	Runners-up	Score
1894	Prague	(United Kingdom) Harold Gandon	(German Empire) H. Voss	6–0, 6–1, 6–3
1895	Prague	(United Kingdom) Conway Price	(United Kingdom) Harold Gandon	6–1, 6–2, 6–4
1896	Prague	(United Kingdom) Herbert Dering	(United Kingdom) Maurice F. Day	6–3, 6–0 ret.
1897	Prague	(United Kingdom) Herbert Dering	(United Kingdom) Harold Gandon	6–3, 6–1 ret.
1898	Prague	(German Empire) Jorge André	(Austria-Hungary) Rolf Kinzl	6–1, 0–6, 6–3, 6–3
1899	Prague	(United Kingdom) Herbert Dering	(Austria-Hungary) Alfred Ringhoffer	1–6, 6–0, 7–5
1900	Prague	(United Kingdom) Major Ritchie	(United Kingdom) Herbert Dering	w.o.
1901	Prague	(United Kingdom) Major Ritchie	(Austria-Hungary) Kurt von Wessely	6–1, 6–2, 6–1
1902	Prague	(United Kingdom) Major Ritchie	(United Kingdom) Frederick W. Payn	6–3, 6–2, 6–4
1903	Prague	(United Kingdom) Major Ritchie	(Austria-Hungary) Kurt von Wessely	6–0, 6–0, 6–2
1904	Prague	(United Kingdom) Herbert Roper Barrett	(United Kingdom) Major Ritchie	1–6, 6–2, 3–0 ret.
1905	Prague	(United Kingdom) Major Ritchie	(Austria-Hungary) Kurt von Wessely	6–3, 8–6, 6–4
1906	Prague	(New Zealand) Anthony Wilding	(United Kingdom) Major Ritchie	7–5, 2–6, 7–5, 6–3
1907	Prague	(New Zealand) Anthony Wilding	(German Empire) Oscar Kreuzer	6–1, 6–1, 6–1
1908	Not held			
1909	Prague	(Austria-Hungary) Kurt von Wessely	(Austria-Hungary) Felix Pipes	8–6, 6–1, 7–5
1910	Prague	(German Empire) Heinrich Kleinschroth	(Bohemia) Jaroslav Just	6–2, 6–1, 6–1
1911	Prague	(German Empire) Heinrich Kleinschroth	(German Empire) Oscar Kreuzer	5–7, 3–6, 6–1 ret.
1912	Prague	(German Empire) Otto Froitzheim	(German Empire) Oscar Kreuzer	6–1, 6–1 ret.
1913	Prague	(German Empire) Oscar Kreuzer	(Austria-Hungary) Felix Pipes	8–6, 6–1, 7–5
1914	Prague	(German Empire) Oscar Kreuzer	(German Empire) Heinrich Kleinschroth	6–2, 7–5, 6–4
1915–1919	Not held			
1920	Vienna	(Austria) Ludwig von Salm-Hoogstraeten	(Austria) Rolf Kinzl	6–4, 6–4, 6–1
1921	Vienna	(Weimar Republic) Robert Kleinschroth	(Weimar Republic) Heinrich Kleinschroth	7–5, 8–6
1922	Vienna	(Hungary) Béla von Kehrling	(Austria) Paul Brick	6–1, 6–2, 6–2
1923	Vienna	(Weimar Republic) Oscar Kreuzer	(Czechoslovakia) Friedrich Röhrer	6–4, 6–1, 6–3
1924	Vienna	(Italy) Uberto de Morpurgo	(Hungary) Béla von Kehrling	4–6, 6–3, 6–1, 6–4
1925	Vienna	(Czechoslovakia) Jan Koželuh	(Czechoslovakia) Pavel Macenauer	w.o.
1926	Vienna	(Czechoslovakia) Jan Koželuh	(Austria) Willy Winterstein	6–2, 6–1, 6–3
1927	Vienna	(France) Roger George	(France) Antoine Gentien	6–4, 6–3, 2–6, 1–6, 6–0
1928	Vienna	(France) Henri Cochet	(Austria) Franz-Wilhelm Matejka	6–4, 6–2, 4–6, 6–4
1929	Vienna	(France) Henri Cochet	(Austria) Franz-Wilhelm Matejka	6–3, 7–5, 6–3
1930	Vienna	(United States) Bill Tilden	(Austria) Franz-Wilhelm Matejka	6–2, 8–6, 6–4
1931	Vienna	(France) Henri Cochet	(Czechoslovakia) Roderich Menzel	4–6, 6–1, 6–1, 6–4
1932	Vienna	(France) Emmanuel du Plaix	(Czechoslovakia) Roderich Menzel	w.o.
1933	Vienna	(Nazi Germany) Daniel Prenn	(Austria) Herbert Kinzl	6–1, 5–7, 6–3, 6–1
1934	Vienna	(Austria) Franz-Wilhelm Matejka	(Austria) Georg Felix von Metaxa	6–3, 4–6, 5–7, 6–3, 6–4
1935	Vienna	(Italy) Giovanni Palmieri	(Italy) Giorgio de Stefani	6–4, 4–6, 6–1, 7–5
1936	Vienna	(Austria) Adam Baworowski	(Austria) Georg Felix von Metaxa	3–6, 6–1, 1–6, 6–3, 6–1
1937	Vienna	(Hungary) Ottó Szigeti	(Austria) Hans Redl	8–6, 5–7, 6–0, 6–2
1938–1948	Not held			
1949	Vienna	(Socialist Federal Republic of Yugoslavia) Dragutin Mitić	(Socialist Federal Republic of Yugoslavia) Josip Palada	8–6, 7–5, 7–5
1950	Vienna	(United States) Fred Kovaleski	(United States) Irvin Dorfman	2–6, 5–7, 6–1, 6–4, 6–3
1951	Vienna	(Austria) Fred Huber	(Italy) Enzo Pautassi	6–3, 6–3, 6–4
1952	Salzburg	(Egypt) Jaroslav Drobný	(South Africa) Eric Sturgess	6–2, 4–6, 2–6, 6–4, 6–0
1953	Not held			
1954	Vienna	(Denmark) Kurt Nielsen	(United States) Malcolm Fox	6–3, 7–5, 6–1
1955	Vienna	(Poland) Władysław Skonecki	(Chile) Luis Ayala	6–3, 6–2, 4–6, 6–2
1956	Vienna	(Austria) Fred Huber	(Australia) Lew Hoad	6–2, 6–4, 8–6
1957	Vienna	(Australia) Lew Hoad	(Egypt) Jaroslav Drobný	6–3, 6–3, 6–3
1958	Pörtschach	(Egypt) Jaroslav Drobný	(India) Ramanathan Krishnan	6–3, 3–6, 6–3, 6–4
1959	Kitzbühel	(United States) Budge Patty	(Austria) Ladislav Legenstein	8–6, 6–1, 6–2
1960	Pörtschach	(United Kingdom) Billy Knight	(United States) Budge Patty	6–2, 6–3, 3–6, 6–3
1961	Kitzbühel	(Australia) Roy Emerson	(Australia) Rod Laver	6–3, 6–3, 3–6, 0–6, 6–2
1962	Graz	(West Germany) Ingo Buding	(Australia) Alan Lane	6–1, 6–2
1963	Pörtschach	(Australia) Fred Stolle	(Australia) Bob Hewitt	6–2, 7–5, 6–1
1964	Vienna	(Socialist Federal Republic of Yugoslavia) Boro Jovanović	(Italy) Giuseppe Merlo	4–6, 6–3, 6–3, 6–0
1965	Kitzbühel	(West Germany) Wilhelm Bungert	(South Africa) Bob Hewitt	5–7, 5–7, 6–4, 6–3, 6–3
1966	Pörtschach	(Romania) Ion Țiriac	(Hungary) István Gulyás	6–4, 10–8, 9–7
1967	Kitzbühel	(Australia) Martin Mulligan	(West Germany) Wilhelm Bungert	6–2, 6–2, 2–6, 6–4
1968	Pörtschach	(Australia) Martin Mulligan	(West Germany) Wilhelm Bungert	6–2, 6–2, 6–3
↓ Open Era ↓
1969	Kitzbühel	(Spain) Manuel Santana	(Spain) Manuel Orantes	6–4, 6–2, 6–3
1970	Kitzbühel	(Socialist Federal Republic of Yugoslavia) Željko Franulović	(Australia) John Alexander	6–4, 9–7, 6–4
1971	Kitzbühel	No winner	(United States) Clark Graebner (Spain) Manuel Orantes	6–1, 7–5, 6–7, 6–7, 4–4 (Note: Match suspended due to lack of light. Both players shared the prize)
↓ Grand Prix circuit ↓
1972	Kitzbühel	(Australia) Colin Dibley	(Australia) Dick Crealy	6–1, 6–3, 6–4
1973	Kitzbühel	No winner	(Mexico) Raúl Ramírez (Spain) Manuel Orantes	(Note: Match was suspended due to heavy rain before it started. Both players shared the prize)
1974	Kitzbühel	(Hungary) Balázs Taróczy	(New Zealand) Onny Parun	6–1, 6–4, 6–4
1975	Kitzbühel	(Italy) Adriano Panatta	(Czechoslovakia) Jan Kodeš	2–6, 6–2, 7–5, 6–4
1976	Kitzbühel	(Spain) Manuel Orantes	(Czechoslovakia) Jan Kodeš	7–6, 6–2, 7–6
1977	Kitzbühel	(Argentina) Guillermo Vilas	(Czechoslovakia) Jan Kodeš	5–7, 6–2, 4–6, 6–3, 6–2
1978	Kitzbühel	(New Zealand) Chris Lewis	(Czechoslovakia) Vladimír Zedník	6–1, 6–4, 6–0
1979	Kitzbühel	(United States) Vitas Gerulaitis	(Czechoslovakia) Pavel Složil	6–2, 6–2, 6–4
1980	Kitzbühel	(Argentina) Guillermo Vilas	(Czechoslovakia) Ivan Lendl	6–3, 6–2, 6–2
1981	Kitzbühel	(Australia) John Fitzgerald	(Argentina) Guillermo Vilas	3–6, 6–3, 7–5
1982	Kitzbühel	(Argentina) Guillermo Vilas	(Brazil) Marcos Hocevar	7–6, 6–1
1983	Kitzbühel	(Argentina) Guillermo Vilas	(France) Henri Leconte	7–6, 4–6, 6–4
1984	Kitzbühel	(Spain) José Higueras	(Paraguay) Víctor Pecci	7–5, 3–6, 6–1
1985	Kitzbühel	(Czechoslovakia) Pavel Složil	(Germany) Michael Westphal	7–5, 6–2
1986	Kitzbühel	(Czechoslovakia) Miloslav Mečíř	(Ecuador) Andrés Gómez	6–4, 4–6, 6–1, 2–6, 6–3
1987	Kitzbühel	(Spain) Emilio Sánchez	(Czechoslovakia) Miloslav Mečíř	6–4, 6–1, 4–6, 6–1
1988	Kitzbühel	(Sweden) Kent Carlsson	(Spain) Emilio Sánchez	6–1, 6–1, 4–6, 4–6, 6–3
1989	Kitzbühel	(Spain) Emilio Sánchez	(Argentina) Martín Jaite	7–6, 6–1, 2–6, 6–2
↓ ATP Tour 250 (Note: Known as World Series from 1990 till 1999.) ↓
1990	Kitzbühel	(Argentina) Horacio de la Peña	(Czechoslovakia) Karel Nováček	6–4, 7–6, 2–6, 6–2
1991	Kitzbühel	(Czechoslovakia) Karel Nováček	(Sweden) Magnus Gustafsson	7–6^{(7–2)}, 7–6^{(7–4)}, 6–2
1992	Kitzbühel	(United States) Pete Sampras	(Argentina) Alberto Mancini	6–3, 7–5, 6–3
1993	Kitzbühel	(Austria) Thomas Muster	(Spain) Javier Sánchez	6–3, 7–5, 6–4
1994	Kitzbühel	(Croatia) Goran Ivanišević	(France) Fabrice Santoro	6–2, 4–6, 4–6, 6–3, 6–2
1995	Kitzbühel	(Spain) Albert Costa	(Austria) Thomas Muster	4–6, 6–4, 7–6^{(7–3)}, 2–6, 6–4
1996	Kitzbühel	(Spain) Alberto Berasategui	(Spain) Àlex Corretja	6–2, 6–4, 6–4
1997	Kitzbühel	(Belgium) Filip Dewulf	(Spain) Julián Alonso	7–6^{(7–2)}, 6–4, 6–1
1998	Kitzbühel	(Spain) Albert Costa	(Italy) Andrea Gaudenzi	6–2, 1–6, 6–2, 3–6, 6–1
↓ ATP Tour 500 (Note: Known as Championship Series from 1990 till 1999 and International Series Gold from 2000 till 2008.) ↓
1999	Kitzbühel	(Spain) Albert Costa	(Spain) Fernando Vicente	7–5, 6–2, 6–7^{(5–7)}, 7–6^{(7–4)}
2000	Kitzbühel	(Spain) Àlex Corretja	(Spain) Emilio Benfele Álvarez	6–3, 6–1, 3–0, ret.
2001	Kitzbühel	(Ecuador) Nicolás Lapentti	(Spain) Albert Costa	1–6, 6–4, 7–5, 7–5
2002	Kitzbühel	(Spain) Àlex Corretja	(Spain) Juan Carlos Ferrero	6–4, 6–1, 6–3
2003	Kitzbühel	(Argentina) Guillermo Coria	(Chile) Nicolás Massú	6–1, 6–4, 6–2
2004	Kitzbühel	(Chile) Nicolás Massú	(Argentina) Gastón Gaudio	7–6^{(7–3)}, 6–4
2005	Kitzbühel	(Argentina) Gastón Gaudio	(Spain) Fernando Verdasco	2–6, 6–2, 6–4, 6–4
2006	Kitzbühel	(Argentina) Agustín Calleri	(Argentina) Juan Ignacio Chela	7–6^{(11–9)}, 6–2, 6–3
2007	Kitzbühel	(Argentina) Juan Mónaco	(Italy) Potito Starace	5–7, 6–3, 6–4
2008	Kitzbühel	(Argentina) Juan Martín del Potro	(Austria) Jürgen Melzer	6–2, 6–1
↓ ATP Tour 250 ↓
2009	Kitzbühel	(Spain) Guillermo García López	(France) Julien Benneteau	3–6, 7–6^{(7–1)}, 6–3
↓ ATP Challenger Tour ↓
2010	Kitzbühel	(Italy) Andreas Seppi	(Romania) Victor Crivoi	6–2, 6–1
↓ ATP Tour 250 ↓
2011	Kitzbühel	(Netherlands) Robin Haase	(Spain) Albert Montañés	6–4, 4–6, 6–1
2012	Kitzbühel	(Netherlands) Robin Haase	(Germany) Philipp Kohlschreiber	6–7^{(2–7)}, 6–3, 6–2
2013	Kitzbühel	(Spain) Marcel Granollers	(Argentina) Juan Mónaco	0–6, 7–6^{(7–3)}, 6–4
2014	Kitzbühel	(Belgium) David Goffin	(Austria) Dominic Thiem	4–6, 6–1, 6–3
2015	Kitzbühel	(Germany) Philipp Kohlschreiber	(France) Paul-Henri Mathieu	2–6, 6–2, 6–2
2016	Kitzbühel	(Italy) Paolo Lorenzi	(Georgia (country)) Nikoloz Basilashvili	6–3, 6–4
2017	Kitzbühel	(Germany) Philipp Kohlschreiber	(Portugal) João Sousa	6–3, 6–4
2018	Kitzbühel	(Slovakia) Martin Kližan	(Uzbekistan) Denis Istomin	6–2, 6–2
2019	Kitzbühel	(Austria) Dominic Thiem	(Spain) Albert Ramos Viñolas	7–6^{(7–0)}, 6–1
2020	Kitzbühel	(Serbia) Miomir Kecmanović	(Germany) Yannick Hanfmann	6–4, 6–4
2021	Kitzbühel	(Norway) Casper Ruud	(Spain) Pedro Martínez	6–1, 4–6, 6–3
2022	Kitzbühel	(Spain) Roberto Bautista Agut	(Austria) Filip Misolic	6–2, 6–2
2023	Kitzbühel	(Argentina) Sebastián Báez	(Austria) Dominic Thiem	6–3, 6–1
2024	Kitzbühel	(Italy) Matteo Berrettini	(France) Hugo Gaston	7–5, 6–3
2025	Kitzbühel	(Kazakhstan) Alexander Bublik	(France) Arthur Cazaux	6–4, 6–3
2026	Kitzbühel	(France) Quentin Halys	(Kazakhstan) Alexander Bublik	6–4, 7–6^{(8–6)}

=== Doubles ===
Year	Champions	Runners-up	Score
1995	(United States) Francisco Montana (United States) Greg Van Emburgh	(Spain) Jordi Arrese (Australia) Wayne Arthurs	6–7, 6–3, 7–6
1996	(Belgium) Libor Pimek (South Africa) Byron Talbot	(South Africa) David Adams (Netherlands) Menno Oosting	7–6^{(7–5)}, 6–3
1997	(Australia) Wayne Arthurs (Australia) Richard Fromberg	(Austria) Thomas Buchmayer (Austria) Thomas Strengberger	6–4, 6–3
1998	(Netherlands) Tom Kempers (Argentina) Daniel Orsanic	(Australia) Joshua Eagle (Australia) Andrew Kratzmann	6–3, 6–4
1999	(South Africa) Chris Haggard (Sweden) Peter Nyborg	(Spain) Álex Calatrava (Serbia) Dušan Vemić	6–3, 6–7^{(4–7)}, 7–6^{(7–4)}
2000	(Argentina) Pablo Albano (Czech Republic) Cyril Suk	(Australia) Joshua Eagle (Australia) Andrew Florent	6–3, 3–6, 6–3
2001	(Spain) Àlex Corretja (Argentina) Luis Lobo	(Sweden) Simon Aspelin (Australia) Andrew Kratzmann	6–1, 6–4
2002	(South Africa) Robbie Koenig (Japan) Thomas Shimada	(Argentina) Lucas Arnold Ker (Spain) Àlex Corretja	7–6^{(7–3)}, 6–4
2003	(Czech Republic) Martin Damm (Czech Republic) Cyril Suk	(Austria) Jürgen Melzer (Austria) Alexander Peya	6–4, 6–4
2004	(Czech Republic) Leoš Friedl (Czech Republic) František Čermák	(Argentina) Lucas Arnold Ker (Argentina) Martín García	6–3, 7–5
2005	(Romania) Andrei Pavel (Czech Republic) Leoš Friedl	(Belgium) Christophe Rochus (Belgium) Olivier Rochus	6–2, 6–7^{(5–7)}, 6–0
2006	(Germany) Philipp Kohlschreiber (Austria) Stefan Koubek	(Austria) Oliver Marach (Czech Republic) Cyril Suk	6–2, 6–3
2007	(Italy) Potito Starace (Peru) Luis Horna	(Germany) Tomas Behrend (Germany) Christopher Kas	7–6^{(7–4)}, 7–6^{(7–5)}
2008	(United States) James Cerretani (Romania) Victor Hănescu	(Argentina) Lucas Arnold Ker (Belgium) Olivier Rochus	6–3, 7–5
2009	(Brazil) André Sá (Brazil) Marcelo Melo	(Romania) Andrei Pavel (Romania) Horia Tecău	6–7^{(7–9)}, 6–2, [10–7]
2010	(Jamaica) Dustin Brown (Netherlands) Rogier Wassen	(Chile) Hans Podlipnik Castillo (Austria) Max Raditschnigg	3–6, 7–5, [10–7]
2011	(Italy) Daniele Bracciali (Mexico) Santiago González	(Brazil) Franco Ferreiro (Brazil) André Sá	7–6^{(7–1)}, 4–6, [11–9]
2012	(Czech Republic) František Čermák (Austria) Julian Knowle	(Germany) Dustin Brown (Australia) Paul Hanley	7–6^{(7–4)}, 3–6, [12–10]
2013	(Germany) Martin Emmrich (Germany) Christopher Kas	(Czech Republic) František Čermák (Czech Republic) Lukáš Dlouhý	6–4, 6–3
2014	(Finland) Henri Kontinen (Finland) Jarkko Nieminen	(Italy) Daniele Bracciali (Kazakhstan) Andrey Golubev	6–1, 6–4
2015	(Spain) Nicolás Almagro (Argentina) Carlos Berlocq	(Netherlands) Robin Haase (Finland) Henri Kontinen	5–7, 6–3, [11–9]
2016	(Netherlands) Wesley Koolhof (Netherlands) Matwé Middelkoop	(Austria) Dennis Novak (Austria) Dominic Thiem	2–6, 6–3, [11–9]
2017	(Uruguay) Pablo Cuevas (Argentina) Guillermo Durán	(Chile) Hans Podlipnik Castillo (Belarus) Andrei Vasilevski	6–4, 4–6, [12–10]
2018	(Czech Republic) Roman Jebavý (Argentina) Andrés Molteni	(Italy) Daniele Bracciali (Argentina) Federico Delbonis	6–2, 6–4
2019	(Austria) Philipp Oswald (Slovakia) Filip Polášek	(Belgium) Sander Gillé (Belgium) Joran Vliegen	6–4, 6–4
2020	(United States) Austin Krajicek (Croatia) Franko Škugor	(Spain) Marcel Granollers (Argentina) Horacio Zeballos	7–6^{(7–5)}, 7–5
2021	(Austria) Alexander Erler (Austria) Lucas Miedler	(Czech Republic) Roman Jebavý (Netherlands) Matwé Middelkoop	7–5, 7–6^{(7–5)}
2022	(Spain) Pedro Martínez (Italy) Lorenzo Sonego	(Germany) Tim Pütz (New Zealand) Michael Venus	5–7, 6–4, [10–8]
2023	(Austria) Alexander Erler (Austria) Lucas Miedler	(Ecuador) Gonzalo Escobar (Kazakhstan) Aleksandr Nedovyesov	6–4, 6–4
2024	(Austria) Alexander Erler (Germany) Andreas Mies	(Germany) Constantin Frantzen (Germany) Hendrik Jebens	6–3, 3–6, [10–6]
2025	(Czech Republic) Petr Nouza (Czech Republic) Patrik Rikl	(Austria) Neil Oberleitner (Austria) Joel Schwärzler	1–6, 7–6^{(7–3)}, [10–5]
2026	(Austria) Lucas Miedler (Australia) Marc Polmans	(Germany) Jakob Schnaitter (Germany) Mark Wallner	6–2, 6–2

Awards and achievements
Preceded by Indianapolis	ATP International Series Gold Tournament of the Year; 2002	Succeeded by Dubai
Preceded by Gstaad	ATP World Series Tournament of the Year; 1997	Succeeded by Dubai
