= Tennis Stadium Kitzbühel =

Tennis stadium in Kitzbühel, Austria

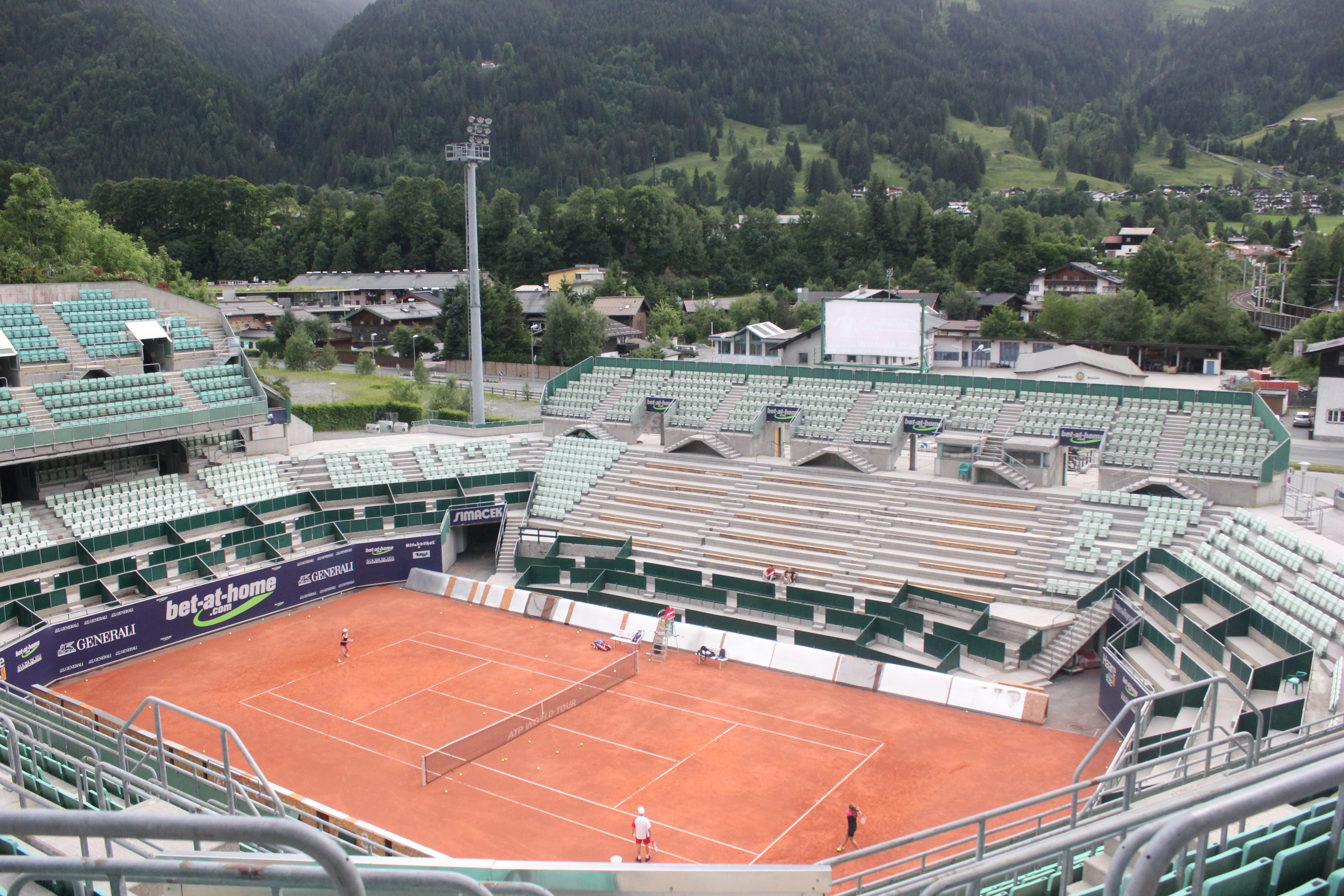
- Interactive map of Tennis Stadium Kitzbühel
- Location: Kitzbühel, Austria
- Coordinates: 47°26′29″N 12°24′2″E
- Capacity: 5.400
- Surface: Clay, Outdoors

Construction
- Groundbreaking: ?
- Opened: ?
- Cost: ?
- Architect: ?

The Tennis Stadium Kitzbühel is a tennis complex located at the Kitzbüheler Tennisclub (KTC) in Kitzbühel in Austria. The stadium has hosted the Austrian Open Kitzbühel since 1945.

== See also ==
- List of tennis stadiums by capacity
