= Sara Errani career statistics =

Career finals
Discipline	Type	Won	Lost	Total
Singles	Grand Slam	0	1	1
Singles	WTA Finals	-	-	-
Singles	WTA 1000	0	1	1
Singles	WTA 500	1	3	4
Singles	WTA 250	8	5	13
Singles	Olympics	-	-	-
Singles	Total	9	10	19
Doubles	Grand Slam	6	4	10
Doubles	WTA Finals	-	-	-
Doubles	WTA 1000	10	5	14
Doubles	WTA 500	4	6	10
Doubles	WTA 250	16	4	20
Doubles	Olympics	1	-	1
Doubles	Total	37	19	56
Mixed	Grand Slam	4	0	4
Mixed	Olympics	-	-	-
Mixed	Total	4	0	4

This is a list of the main career statistics of Italian professional tennis player Sara Errani.

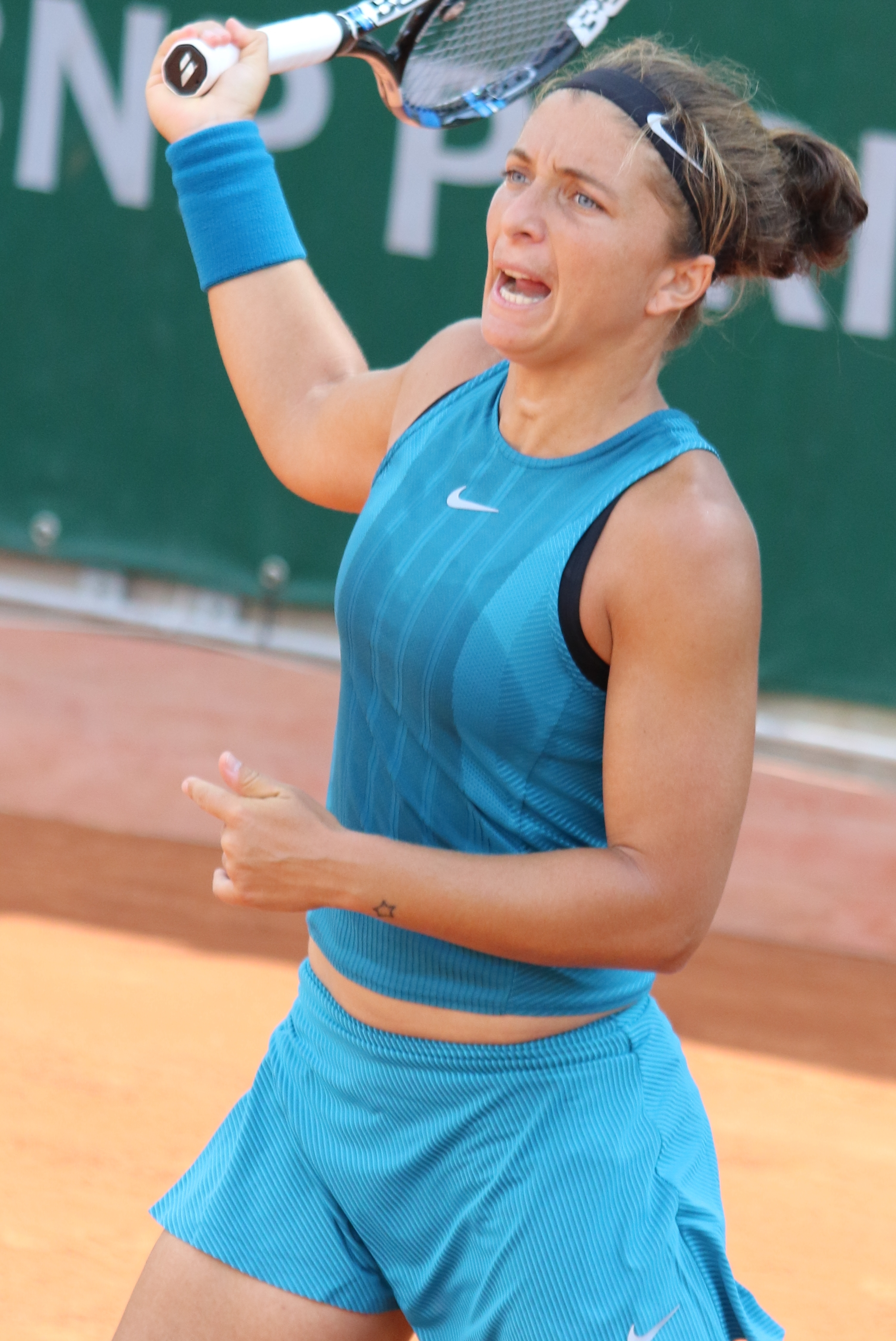
Errani at the 2018 French Open

== Performance timelines ==
Key
W	F	SF	QF	#R	RR	Q#	P#	DNQ	A	Z#	PO	G	S	B	NMS	NTI	P	NH

(W) winner; (F) finalist; (SF) semifinalist; (QF) quarterfinalist; (#R) rounds 4, 3, 2, 1; (RR) round-robin stage; (Q#) qualification round; (P#) preliminary round; (DNQ) did not qualify; (A) absent; (Z#) Davis/Fed Cup Zonal Group (with number indication) or (PO) play-off; (G) gold, (S) silver or (B) bronze Olympic/Paralympic medal; (NMS) not a Masters tournament; (NTI) not a Tier I tournament; (P) postponed; (NH) not held; (SR) strike rate (events won / competed); (W–L) win–loss record.
To avoid confusion and double counting, these charts are updated at the conclusion of a tournament or when the player's participation has ended.

Only main-draw results in WTA Tour, Grand Slam tournaments, Billie Jean King Cup, United Cup, Hopman Cup and Olympic Games are included in win–loss records.

=== Singles ===
Tournament	2004	2005	2006	2007	2008	2009	2010	2011	2012	2013	2014	2015	2016	2017	2018	2019	2020	2021	2022	2023	2024	2025	SR	W–L	Win %
Grand Slam tournaments
Australian Open	A	A	A	Q1	1R	3R	3R	1R	QF	1R	1R	3R	1R	2R	Q3	A	Q1	3R	Q1	Q1	1R	Q2	0 / 12	13–13	50%
French Open	A	A	A	Q1	1R	1R	1R	2R	F	SF	QF	QF	1R	2R	1R	A	2R	Q2	Q2	2R	2R	Q2	0 / 14	25–15	63%
Wimbledon	A	A	Q1	A	1R	2R	3R	2R	3R	1R	1R	2R	2R	1R	A	A	NH	Q1	Q1	1R	1R	A	0 / 12	8–12	40%
US Open	A	A	Q1	2R	2R	3R	3R	1R	SF	2R	QF	3R	1R	A	A	A	A	1R	Q1	Q1	3R	A	0 / 12	20–12	63%
Win–loss	0–0	0–0	0–0	1–1	1–4	5–4	6–4	2–4	17–4	6–4	8–4	9–4	1–4	2–2	0–1	0–0	1–1	2–2	0–0	1–2	3–4	1–2	0 / 50	65–52	56%
National representation
Summer Olympics	A	NH			1R	NH			1R	NH			3R	NH				1R	NH		1R	NH	0 / 5	2–5	29%
Year-end championship
WTA Finals	DNQ								RR	RR	DNQ												0 / 2	2–4	33%
WTA 1000 tournaments
Dubai / Qatar Open (Note: The first Premier 5 event of the year has switched back and forth between the Dubai Tennis Championships and the Qatar Total Open since 2009. Dubai was classified as a Premier 5 event from 2009 to 2011 before being succeeded by Doha for the 2012–2014 period. In 2015, Dubai regained its Premier 5 status while Doha was demoted to Premier status. The Premier 5 tournaments were reclassified as WTA 1000 tournaments in 2021.)	Not Tier I				A	2R	A	2R	A	QF	QF	A	2R	A	A	1R	A	A	Q1	Q1	A		0 / 6	7–6	54%
Indian Wells Open	A	A	A	A	1R	2R	3R	3R	1R	QF	3R	3R	2R	2R	A	Q2	NH	A	Q2	Q2	1R	Q1	0 / 12	10–12	45%
Miami Open	A	A	A	A	3R	2R	3R	1R	2R	QF	3R	4R	2R	2R	Q1	A	NH	Q1	A	Q1	Q1	Q1	0 / 11	11–11	50%
Madrid Open	Not Held					1R	1R	2R	2R	SF	3R	2R	1R	Q1	1R	A	NH	A	A	1R	2R	Q1	0 / 12	10–12	45%
Italian Open	Q1	Q1	1R	1R	3R	1R	1R	2R	2R	SF	F	2R	1R	1R	1R	A	Q1	Q2	A	1R	2R	1R	0 / 16	12–16	43%
Canadian Open	A	A	A	Q1	A	1R	1R	1R	3R	QF	1R	SF	1R	A	A	A	NH	A	A	A	A	A	0 / 8	7–8	47%
Cincinnati Open	Not Tier I					1R	2R	2R	3R	3R	2R	1R	1R	A	A	A	A	A	A	A	Q1	A	0 / 8	5–8	38%
China Open	Not Tier I					2R	2R	1R	1R	3R	1R	QF	A	A	A	A	Not Held			A	Q1	A	0 / 8	7–8	47%
Wuhan Open (Note: In 2014, the Toray Pan Pacific Open was downgraded to a Premier event and replaced by the Wuhan Open. The Premier 5 tournaments were reclassified as WTA 1000 tournaments in 2021.)	A	A	A	A	A	1R	2R	A	QF	2R	2R	1R	1R	A	A	A	Not Held				A	A	0 / 7	4–7	36%
Career statistics
	2004	2005	2006	2007	2008	2009	2010	2011	2012	2013	2014	2015	2016	2017	2018	2019	2020	2021	2022	2023	2024	2025			
Tournaments	0	0	3	7	24	27	29	26	23	22	23	25	24	15	8	6	3	9	5	9			Career total: 289		
Titles	0	0	0	0	2	0	0	0	4	1	0	1	1	0	0	0	0	0	0	0	0	0	Career total: 9		
Finals	0	0	0	0	2	2	0	1	5	4	2	2	1	0	0	0	0	0	0	0	0	0	Career total: 19		
Hard win–loss	0–0	0–0	0–0	4–3	15–10	17–15	21–16	14–18	24–15	25–16	16–16	22–17	13–15	7–6	1–2	0–3	1–1	2–5	0–1	0–2			2 / 153	182–161	53%
Clay win–loss	0–0	0–0	3–3	6–4	15–10	8–9	12–10	13–7	29–4	24–7	19–6	24–9	7–7	9–9	7–8	2–4	3–2	4–4	2–4	1–5			7 / 110	188–112	63%
Grass win–loss	0–0	0–0	0–0	0–0	1–2	1–3	4–3	3–3	2–3	0–1	0–2	2–2	1–2	0–2	0–0	0–0	0–0	0–0	0–0	1–2			0 / 25	15–25	38%
Overall win–loss	0–0	0–0	3–3	10–7	31–22	26–27	37–29	30–28	55–22	49–24	35–24	48–28	21–24	16–17	8–10	2–7	4–3	6–9	2–5	2–9			9 / 288	385–298	56%
Win %	–	–	50%	59%	58%	49%	56%	52%	71%	67%	59%	63%	47%	48%	44%	22%	57%	40%	29%	18%			Career total: 56%		
Year-end ranking	521	359	171	70	42	48	43	45	6	7	15	20	50	143	108	200	130	118	109	101			$13,895,331		

=== Doubles ===
Current through the 2024 Olympics.

Tournament	2005	2006	2007	2008	2009	2010	2011	2012	2013	2014	2015	2016	2017	2018	2019	2020	2021	2022	2023	2024	2025	2026	SR	W–L	Win %
Grand Slam tournaments
Australian Open	A	A	A	1R	1R	1R	1R	F	W	W	3R	1R	2R (Note: Errani withdrew before the second round of the 2017 French Open doubles, which does not officially count as a loss.)	A	A	A	A	A	A	3R	2R	2R	2 / 13	24–10	71%
French Open	A	A	A	2R	2R	2R	3R	W	F	F	A	1R	A	2R	A	A	A	A	1R	F	W	2R	2 / 13	34–11	76%
Wimbledon	A	A	A	2R	2R	3R	3R	QF	3R	W	A	1R	A	A	A	NH	A	A	1R	3R	2R	A	1 / 11	20–10	67%
US Open	A	A	A	1R	1R	1R	QF	W	QF	2R	SF	A	A	A	A	A	1R	A	A	2R	SF	2R	1 / 12	23–11	68%
Win–loss	0–0	0–0	0–0	2–4	2–4	3–4	7–4	19–2	16–3	18–2	6–2	0–3	1–0	1–1	0–0	0–0	0–1	0–0	0–2	10–4	12-3	3–3	6 / 49	102–43	70%
National representation
Summer Olympics	NH			A	NH			QF	NH			QF	NH				2R	NH		G	NH		1 / 4	10–3	77%
Year-end championship
WTA Finals	A							SF	SF	QF	DNQ					NH	DNQ			RR	RR		0 / 5	2-7	22%
WTA 1000 tournaments
Dubai / Qatar Open	Not Tier I				1R	A	1R	A	W	SF	A	F	A	A	A	A	A	A	A	1R	W	SF	2 / 8	16–6	73%
Indian Wells Open	A	A	A	A	A	1R	1R	QF	2R	1R	A	SF	2R	A	A	NH	A	A	A	1R	1R	SF	0 / 10	10–10	50%
Miami Open	A	A	A	A	A	1R	1R	F	SF	1R	A	2R	1R	A	A	NH	A	A	A	SF	2R	F	0 / 10	13-10	57%
Madrid Open	Not Held				A	1R	1R	W	A	W	A	2R	A	A	A	NH	A	A	A	1R	2R	2R	2 / 8	10–5	67%
Italian Open	1R	1R	2R	1R	1R	2R	A	W	F	F	A	2R	QF	2R	1R	A	SF	A	A	W	W	2R	3 / 16	30–12	71%
Canadian Open	A	A	A	A	A	QF	2R	2R	QF	W	QF	1R	A	A	A	NH	A	A	A	A	2R	F	1 / 8	13–7	65%
Cincinnati Open	Not Tier I				A	1R	QF	QF	QF	QF	QF	QF	A	A	A	A	A	A	A	QF	SF	2R	0 / 10	14–9	61%
China Open	Not Tier I				2R	2R	2R	A	SF	QF	2R	A	A	A	A	Not Held			A	W	W	QF	2 / 8	19–6	76%
Wuhan Open	A	A	A	A	A	1R	A	A	A	QF	1R	A	A	A	A	Not Held				2R	A	SF	0 / 5	4–5	44%
Career statistics
	2005	2006	2007	2008	2009	2010	2011	2012	2013	2014	2015	2016	2017	2018	2019	2020	2021	2022	2023	2024	2025	2026			
Tournaments	1	6	7	14	19	27	23	17	15	19	7	14	7	5	3	3	4	4	6	17			Career total: 218		
Titles	0	0	0	1	1	3	3	8	3	5	1	0	1	1	0	0	0	0	1	3			Career total: 31		
Finals	0	0	0	1	1	5	6	10	6	8	1	1	1	1	0	0	0	1	1	4			Career total: 47		
Hard win–loss	0–0	0–1	2–1	2–6	4–8	13–16	22–13	21–8	28–9	22–10	15–6	14–9	7–3	5–1	1–1	1–3	1–2	4–3	4–0	18–11			15 / 127	184–111	62%
Clay win–loss	0–1	1–5	2–3	8–7	6–8	19–5	10–4	23–0	9–2	16–2	1–1	2–3	2–1	3–2	0–3	0–0	6–2	0–1	4–3	10–3			13 / 69	122–56	69%
Grass win–loss	0–0	0–0	0–0	1–1	5–2	4–3	5–3	8–2	2–1	8–1	0–0	0–2	0–0	0–0	0–0	0–0	0–1	0–0	0–2	2–2			3 / 22	35–20	64%
Overall win–loss	0–1	1–6	4–4	11–14	15–18	36–24	37–20	52–10	39–12	46–13	16–7	16–14	9–4	8–3	1–4	1–3	7–5	4–4	8–5	30–16			31 / 218	341–187	65%
Year-end ranking	203	197	159	103	73	32	27	2	1	1	42	45	179	108	630	378	131	305	125	8	3				

== Grand Slam tournament finals ==
=== Singles: 1 (1 runner-up) ===
Result	Year	Tournament	Surface	Opponent	Score
Loss	2012	French Open	Clay	(Russia) Maria Sharapova	3–6, 2–6

=== Doubles: 10 (6 titles, 4 runner-ups) ===
Result	Year	Tournament	Surface	Partner	Opponents	Score
Loss	2012	Australian Open	Hard	(Italy) Roberta Vinci	(Russia) Svetlana Kuznetsova (Russia) Vera Zvonareva	7–5, 4–6, 3–6
Win	2012	French Open	Clay	(Italy) Roberta Vinci	(Russia) Maria Kirilenko (Russia) Nadia Petrova	4–6, 6–4, 6–2
Win	2012	US Open	Hard	(Italy) Roberta Vinci	(Czech Republic) Andrea Hlaváčková (Czech Republic) Lucie Hradecká	6–4, 6–2
Win	2013	Australian Open	Hard	(Italy) Roberta Vinci	(Australia) Ashleigh Barty (Australia) Casey Dellacqua	6–2, 3–6, 6–2
Loss	2013	French Open	Clay	(Italy) Roberta Vinci	(Russia) Ekaterina Makarova (Russia) Elena Vesnina	5–7, 2–6
Win	2014	Australian Open (2)	Hard	(Italy) Roberta Vinci	(Russia) Ekaterina Makarova (Russia) Elena Vesnina	6–4, 3–6, 7–5
Loss	2014	French Open	Clay	(Italy) Roberta Vinci	(Chinese Taipei) Hsieh Su-wei (China) Peng Shuai	4–6, 1–6
Win	2014	Wimbledon	Grass	(Italy) Roberta Vinci	(Hungary) Tímea Babos (France) Kristina Mladenovic	6–1, 6–3
Loss	2024	French Open	Clay	(Italy) Jasmine Paolini	(United States) Coco Gauff (Czech Republic) Kateřina Siniaková	6–7^{(5–7)}, 3–6
Win	2025	French Open	Clay	(Italy) Jasmine Paolini	(Kazakhstan) Anna Danilina (Serbia) Aleksandra Krunić	6–4, 2–6, 6–1

=== Mixed doubles: 4 (4 titles) ===
Result	Year	Tournament	Surface	Partner	Opponents	Score
Win	2024	US Open	Hard	(Italy) Andrea Vavassori	(United States) Donald Young (United States) Taylor Townsend	7–6^{(7–0)}, 7–5
Win	2025	French Open	Clay	(Italy) Andrea Vavassori	(United States) Evan King (United States) Taylor Townsend	6–4, 6–2
Win	2025	US Open	Hard	(Italy) Andrea Vavassori	(Norway) Casper Ruud (Poland) Iga Świątek	6–3, 5–7, [10–6]
Win	2026	French Open (2)	Clay	(Italy) Andrea Vavassori	(Canada) Gabriela Dabrowski (United States) Evan King	4–6, 6–3, [10–4]

== Other significant finals ==
=== WTA 1000 tournaments ===
==== Singles: 1 runner-up ====
Result	Year	Tournament	Surface	Opponent	Score
Loss	2014	Italian Open	Clay	(United States) Serena Williams	3–6, 0–6

==== Mixed doubles : 1 title ====
Result	Year	Tournament	Surface	Partner	Opponents	Score
Win	2025	Indian Wells	Hard	(Italy) Andrea Vavassori	(United States) Bethanie Mattek-Sands (Croatia) Mate Pavić	6–7^{(3–7)}, 6–3, [10–8]

==== Doubles: 15 (10 titles, 5 runner-ups) ====
Result	Year	Tournament	Surface	Partner	Opponent	Score
Loss	2012	Miami Open	Hard	(Italy) Roberta Vinci	(Russia) Maria Kirilenko (Russia) Nadia Petrova	6–7^{(0–7)}, 6–4, [4–10]
Win	2012	Madrid Open	Clay	(Italy) Roberta Vinci	(Russia) Ekaterina Makarova (Russia) Elena Vesnina	6–1, 3–6, [10–4]
Win	2012	Italian Open	Clay	(Italy) Roberta Vinci	(Russia) Ekaterina Makarova (Russia) Elena Vesnina	6–2, 7–5
Win	2013	Qatar Open	Hard	(Italy) Roberta Vinci	(Russia) Nadia Petrova (Slovenia) Katarina Srebotnik	2–6, 6–3, [10–6]
Loss	2013	Italian Open	Clay	(Italy) Roberta Vinci	(Chinese Taipei) Hsieh Su-wei (China) Peng Shuai	6–4, 3–6, [8–10]
Win	2014	Madrid Open (2)	Clay	(Italy) Roberta Vinci	(Spain) Garbiñe Muguruza (Spain) Carla Suárez Navarro	6–4, 6–3
Loss	2014	Italian Open	Clay	(Italy) Roberta Vinci	(Czech Republic) Květa Peschke (Slovenia) Katarina Srebotnik	0–4, retired
Win	2014	Canadian Open	Hard	(Italy) Roberta Vinci	(Zimbabwe) Cara Black (India) Sania Mirza	7–6^{(7–4)}, 6–3
Loss	2016	Qatar Open	Hard	(Spain) Carla Suárez Navarro	(Chinese Taipei) Chan Hao-ching (Chinese Taipei) Chan Yung-jan	3–6, 3–6
Win	2024	Italian Open (2)	Clay	(Italy) Jasmine Paolini	(United States) Coco Gauff (New Zealand) Erin Routliffe	6–3, 4–6, [10–8]
Win	2024	China Open	Hard	(Italy) Jasmine Paolini	(Chinese Taipei) Chan Hao-ching; Veronika Kudermetova	6–4, 6–4
Win	2025	Qatar Open (2)	Hard	(Italy) Jasmine Paolini	(China) Jiang Xinyu (Chinese Taipei) Wu Fang-hsien	7–5, 7–6^{(12–10)}
Win	2025	Italian Open (3)	Clay	(Italy) Jasmine Paolini	Veronika Kudermetova (Belgium) Elise Mertens	6–4, 7–5
Win	2025	China Open (2)	Hard	(Italy) Jasmine Paolini	(Japan) Miyu Kato (Hungary) Fanny Stollár	6–7^{(1–7)}, 6–3, [10–2]
Loss	2026	Miami Open	Hard	(Italy) Jasmine Paolini	(Czech Republic) Kateřina Siniaková (United States) Taylor Townsend	6–7^{(0–7)}, 1–6

=== Olympic finals ===
==== Doubles: 1 (1 Gold) ====
Result	Year	Tournament	Surface	Partner	Opponents	Score
Gold	2024	Paris Olympics	Clay	(Italy) Jasmine Paolini	Mirra Andreeva; Diana Shnaider	2–6, 6–1, [10–7]

== WTA Tour finals ==
=== Singles: 19 (9 titles, 10 runner-ups) ===
Legend Grand Slam (0–1) Premier 5 (0–1) Premier (1–3) Tier IV / International (8–5)	Finals by Surface Hard (2–5) Clay (7–5)

Result	W–L	Date	Tournament	Tier	Surface	Opponent	Score
Win	1–0	Jul 2008	Palermo Open, Italy	Tier IV	Clay	(Ukraine) Mariya Koryttseva	6–2, 6–3
Win	2–0	Jul 2008	Slovenia Open, Slovenia	Tier IV	Hard	(Spain) Anabel Medina Garrigues	6–3, 6–3
Loss	2–1	Jul 2009	Palermo Open, Italy	International	Clay	(Italy) Flavia Pennetta	1–6, 2–6
Loss	2–2	Jul 2009	Slovenia Open, Slovenia	International	Hard	(Russia) Dinara Safina	7–6^{(7–5)}, 1–6, 5–7
Loss	2–3	Feb 2011	Pattaya Open, Thailand	International	Hard	(Slovakia) Daniela Hantuchová	0–6, 2–6
Win	3–3	Mar 2012	Mexican Open, Mexico	International	Clay	(Italy) Flavia Pennetta	5–7, 7–6^{(7–2)}, 6–0
Win	4–3	Apr 2012	Barcelona Open, Spain	International	Clay	(Slovakia) Dominika Cibulková	6–2, 6–2
Win	5–3	May 2012	Budapest Grand Prix, Hungary	International	Clay	(Russia) Elena Vesnina	7–5, 6–4
Loss	5–4	Jun 2012	French Open, France	Grand Slam	Clay	(Russia) Maria Sharapova	3–6, 2–6
Win	6–4	Jul 2012	Palermo Open, Italy (2)	International	Clay	(Czech Republic) Barbora Strýcová	6–1, 6–3
Loss	6–5	Feb 2013	Open GDF Suez, France	Premier	Hard (i)	(Germany) Mona Barthel	5–7, 6–7^{(4–7)}
Loss	6–6	Feb 2013	Dubai Championships, UAE	Premier	Hard	(Czech Republic) Petra Kvitová	2–6, 6–1, 1–6
Win	7–6	Mar 2013	Mexican Open, Mexico (2)	International	Clay	(Spain) Carla Suárez Navarro	6–0, 6–4
Loss	7–7	Jul 2013	Palermo Open, Italy	International	Clay	(Italy) Roberta Vinci	3–6, 6–3, 3–6
Loss	7–8	Feb 2014	Open GDF Suez, France	Premier	Hard (i)	(Russia) Anastasia Pavlyuchenkova	6–3, 2–6, 3–6
Loss	7–9	May 2014	Italian Open, Italy	Premier 5	Clay	(United States) Serena Williams	3–6, 0–6
Win	8–9	Feb 2015	Rio Open, Brazil	International	Clay	(Slovakia) Anna Karolína Schmiedlová	7–6^{(7–2)}, 6–1
Loss	8–10	Jul 2015	Bucharest Open, Romania	International	Clay	(Slovakia) Anna Karolína Schmiedlová	6–7^{(3–7)}, 3–6
Win	9–10	Feb 2016	Dubai Championships, UAE	Premier	Hard	(Czech Republic) Barbora Strýcová	6–0, 6–2

=== Doubles: 57 (37 titles, 20 runner-ups) ===
Legend Grand Slam (6–4) Olympics (1–0) Premier M & Premier 5 / WTA 1000 (10–6) Premier / WTA 500 (4–6) Tier IV / International / WTA 250 (16–4)	Finals by Surface Hard (18–10) Grass (3–3) Clay (16–7)

Result	W–L	Date	Tournament	Tier	Surface	Partner	Opponents	Score
Win	1–0	Jul 2008	Palermo Open, Italy	Tier IV	Clay	(Spain) Nuria Llagostera Vives	(Russia) Alla Kudryavtseva (Russia) Anastasia Pavlyuchenkova	2–6, 7–6^{(7–1)}, [10–4]
Win	2–0	Jun 2009	Rosmalen Open, Netherlands	International	Grass	(Italy) Flavia Pennetta	(Netherlands) Michaëlla Krajicek (Belgium) Yanina Wickmayer	6–4, 5–7, [13–11]
Loss	2–1	Feb 2010	Mexican Open, Mexico	International	Clay	(Italy) Roberta Vinci	(Slovenia) Polona Hercog (Czech Republic) Barbora Strýcová	6–2, 1–6, [2–10]
Win	3–1	Apr 2010	Andalucia Tennis Experience, Spain	International	Clay	(Italy) Roberta Vinci	(Russia) Maria Kondratieva (Kazakhstan) Yaroslava Shvedova	6–4, 6–2
Win	4–1	Apr 2010	Barcelona Open, Spain	International	Clay	(Italy) Roberta Vinci	(Switzerland) Timea Bacsinszky (Italy) Tathiana Garbin	6–1, 3–6, [10–2]
Win	5–1	Jul 2010	Palermo Open, Italy (2)	International	Clay	(Italy) Alberta Brianti	(United States) Jill Craybas (Germany) Julia Görges	6–4, 6–1
Loss	5–2	Oct 2010	Kremlin Cup, Russia	Premier	Hard (i)	(Spain) María José; Martínez Sánchez	(Argentina) Gisela Dulko (Italy) Flavia Pennetta	3–6, 6–2, [6–10]
Win	6–2	Jan 2011	Hobart International, Australia	International	Hard	(Italy) Roberta Vinci	(Ukraine) Kateryna Bondarenko (Latvia) Līga Dekmeijere	6–3, 7–5
Win	7–2	Feb 2011	Pattaya Open, Thailand	International	Hard	(Italy) Roberta Vinci	(China) Sun Shengnan (China) Zheng Jie	3–6, 6–3, [10–5]
Loss	7–3	Apr 2011	Andalucia Tennis Experience, Spain	International	Clay	(Italy) Roberta Vinci	(Spain) Nuria Llagostera Vives (Spain) Arantxa Parra Santonja	6–3, 4–6, [5–10]
Loss	7–4	Jun 2011	Birmingham Classic, United Kingdom	International	Grass	(Italy) Roberta Vinci	(Belarus) Olga Govortsova (Russia) Alla Kudryavtseva	6–1, 1–6, [5–10]
Win	8–4	Jul 2011	Palermo Open, Italy (3)	International	Clay	(Italy) Roberta Vinci	(Czech Republic) Andrea Hlaváčková (Czech Republic) Klára Zakopalová	7–5, 6–1
Loss	8–5	Aug 2011	Connecticut Open, United States	Premier	Hard	(Italy) Roberta Vinci	(Chinese Taipei) Chuang Chia-jung (Belarus) Olga Govortsova	5–7, 2–6
Loss	8–6	Jan 2012	Australian Open, Australia	Grand Slam	Hard	(Italy) Roberta Vinci	(Russia) Svetlana Kuznetsova (Russia) Vera Zvonareva	7–5, 4–6, 3–6
Win	9–6	Feb 2012	Monterrey Open, Mexico	International	Hard	(Italy) Roberta Vinci	(Japan) Kimiko Date-Krumm (China) Zhang Shuai	6–2, 7–6^{(8–6)}
Win	10–6	Mar 2012	Mexican Open, Mexico	International	Clay	(Italy) Roberta Vinci	(Spain) Lourdes Domínguez Lino (Spain) Arantxa Parra Santonja	6–2, 6–1
Loss	10–7	Mar 2012	Miami Open, United States	Premier M	Hard	(Italy) Roberta Vinci	(Russia) Maria Kirilenko (Russia) Nadia Petrova	6–7^{(0–7)}, 6–4, [4–10]
Win	11–7	Apr 2012	Barcelona Open, Spain (2)	International	Clay	(Italy) Roberta Vinci	(Italy) Flavia Pennetta (Italy) Francesca Schiavone	6–0, 6–2
Win	12–7	May 2012	Madrid Open, Spain	Premier M	Clay (blue)	(Italy) Roberta Vinci	(Russia) Ekaterina Makarova (Russia) Elena Vesnina	6–1, 3–6, [10–4]
Win	13–7	May 2012	Italian Open, Italy	Premier 5	Clay	(Italy) Roberta Vinci	(Russia) Ekaterina Makarova (Russia) Elena Vesnina	6–2, 7–5
Win	14–7	Jun 2012	French Open, France	Grand Slam	Clay	(Italy) Roberta Vinci	(Russia) Maria Kirilenko (Russia) Nadia Petrova	4–6, 6–4, 6–2
Win	15–7	Jun 2012	Rosmalen Open, Netherlands (2)	International	Grass	(Italy) Roberta Vinci	(Russia) Maria Kirilenko (Russia) Nadia Petrova	6–4, 3–6, [11–9]
Win	16–7	Sep 2012	US Open, United States	Grand Slam	Hard	(Italy) Roberta Vinci	(Czech Republic) Andrea Hlaváčková (Czech Republic) Lucie Hradecká	6–4, 6–2
Loss	16–8	Jan 2013	Sydney International, Australia	Premier	Hard	(Italy) Roberta Vinci	(Russia) Nadia Petrova (Slovenia) Katarina Srebotnik	3–6, 4–6
Win	17–8	Jan 2013	Australian Open, Australia	Grand Slam	Hard	(Italy) Roberta Vinci	(Australia) Ashleigh Barty (Australia) Casey Dellacqua	6–2, 3–6, 6–2
Win	18–8	Feb 2013	Open GDF Suez, France	Premier	Hard (i)	(Italy) Roberta Vinci	(Czech Republic) Andrea Hlaváčková (United States) Liezel Huber	6–1, 6–1
Win	19–8	Feb 2013	Qatar Open, Qatar	Premier 5	Hard	(Italy) Roberta Vinci	(Russia) Nadia Petrova (Slovenia) Katarina Srebotnik	2–6, 6–3, [10–6]
Loss	19–9	May 2013	Italian Open, Italy	Premier 5	Clay	(Italy) Roberta Vinci	(Chinese Taipei) Hsieh Su-wei (China) Peng Shuai	6–4, 3–6, [8–10]
Loss	19–10	Jun 2013	French Open, France	Grand Slam	Clay	(Italy) Roberta Vinci	(Russia) Ekaterina Makarova (Russia) Elena Vesnina	5–7, 2–6
Loss	19–11	Jan 2014	Sydney International, Australia	Premier	Hard	(Italy) Roberta Vinci	(Hungary) Tímea Babos (Czech Republic) Lucie Šafářová	5–7, 6–3, [7–10]
Win	20–11	Jan 2014	Australian Open, Australia (2)	Grand Slam	Hard	(Italy) Roberta Vinci	(Russia) Ekaterina Makarova (Russia) Elena Vesnina	6–4, 3–6, 7–5
Win	21–11	Apr 2014	Stuttgart Grand Prix, Germany	Premier	Clay	(Italy) Roberta Vinci	(Zimbabwe) Cara Black (India) Sania Mirza	6–2, 6–3
Win	22–11	May 2014	Madrid Open, Spain (2)	Premier M	Clay	(Italy) Roberta Vinci	(Spain) Garbiñe Muguruza (Spain) Carla Suárez Navarro	6–4, 6–3
Loss	22–12	May 2014	Italian Open, Italy	Premier 5	Clay	(Italy) Roberta Vinci	(Czech Republic) Květa Peschke (Slovenia) Katarina Srebotnik	0–4, ret.
Loss	22–13	Jun 2014	French Open, France	Grand Slam	Clay	(Italy) Roberta Vinci	(Chinese Taipei) Hsieh Su-wei (China) Peng Shuai	4–6, 1–6
Win	23–13	Jul 2014	Wimbledon, United Kingdom	Grand Slam	Grass	(Italy) Roberta Vinci	(Hungary) Tímea Babos (France) Kristina Mladenovic	6–1, 6–3
Win	24–13	Aug 2014	Canadian Open, Canada	Premier 5	Hard	(Italy) Roberta Vinci	(Zimbabwe) Cara Black (India) Sania Mirza	7–6^{(7–4)}, 6–3
Win	25–13	Jan 2015	Auckland Classic, New Zealand	International	Hard	(Italy) Roberta Vinci	(Japan) Shuko Aoyama (Czech Republic) Renata Voráčová	6–2, 6–1
Loss	25–14	Feb 2016	Qatar Open, Qatar	Premier 5	Hard	(Spain) Carla Suárez Navarro	(Chinese Taipei) Chan Hao-ching (Chinese Taipei) Chan Yung-jan	3–6, 3–6
Win	26–14	Oct 2017	Tianjin Open, China	International	Hard	(Romania) Irina-Camelia Begu	(Slovenia) Dalila Jakupović (Serbia) Nina Stojanović	6–4, 6–3
Win	27–14	Jan 2018	Auckland Classic, New Zealand (2)	International	Hard	(Netherlands) Bibiane Schoofs	(Japan) Eri Hozumi (Japan) Miyu Kato	7–5, 6–1
Loss	27–15	Jan 2022	Melbourne Summer Set, Australia	WTA 250	Hard	(Italy) Jasmine Paolini	(United States) Asia Muhammad (United States) Jessica Pegula	3–6, 1–6
Win	28–15	Oct 2023	Jasmin Open, Tunisia	WTA 250	Hard	(Italy) Jasmine Paolini	(Japan) Mai Hontama (Serbia) Natalija Stevanović	2–6, 7–6^{(7–4)}, [10–6]
Win	29–15	Feb 2024	Ladies Linz, Austria	WTA 500	Hard (i)	(Italy) Jasmine Paolini	(United States) Nicole Melichar-Martinez (Australia) Ellen Perez	7–5, 4–6, [10–7]
Win	30–15	May 2024	Italian Open, Italy (2)	WTA 1000	Clay	(Italy) Jasmine Paolini	(United States) Coco Gauff (New Zealand) Erin Routliffe	6–3, 4–6, [10–8]
Loss	30–16	Jun 2024	French Open, France	Grand Slam	Clay	(Italy) Jasmine Paolini	(United States) Coco Gauff (Czech Republic) Kateřina Siniaková	6–7^{(5–7)}, 3–6
Win	31–16	Aug 2024	Summer Olympics, France	Olympics	Clay	(Italy) Jasmine Paolini	(Individual Neutral Athletes) Mirra Andreeva (Individual Neutral Athletes) Diana Shnaider	2–6, 6–1, [10–7]
Win	32–16	Oct 2024	China Open, China	WTA 1000	Hard	(Italy) Jasmine Paolini	(Chinese Taipei) Chan Hao-ching; Veronika Kudermetova	6–4, 6–4
Win	33–16	Feb 2025	Qatar Open, Qatar	WTA 1000	Hard	(Italy) Jasmine Paolini	(China) Jiang Xinyu (Chinese Taipei) Wu Fang-hsien	7–5, 7–6^{(12–10)}
Win	34–16	May 2025	Italian Open, Italy (3)	WTA 1000	Clay	(Italy) Jasmine Paolini	Veronika Kudermetova (Belgium) Elise Mertens	6–4, 7–5
Win	35–16	Jun 2025	French Open, France (2)	Grand Slam	Clay	(Italy) Jasmine Paolini	(Kazakhstan) Anna Danilina (Serbia) Aleksandra Krunić	6–4, 2–6, 6–1
Loss	35–17	Jun 2025	German Open, Germany	WTA 500	Grass	(Italy) Jasmine Paolini	(Slovakia) Tereza Mihalíková (United Kingdom) Olivia Nicholls	6−4, 2−6, [6−10]
Win	36–17	Oct 2025	China Open, China (2)	WTA 1000	Hard	(Italy) Jasmine Paolini	(Japan) Miyu Kato (Hungary) Fanny Stollár	6–7^{(1–7)}, 6–3, [10–2]
Loss	36–18	Mar 2026	Miami Open, USA	WTA 1000	Hard	(Italy) Jasmine Paolini	(Czech Republic) Kateřina Siniaková (United States) Taylor Townsend	6–7^{(0–7)}, 1–6
Loss	36–19	Jun 2026	German Open, Germany	WTA 500	Grass	(United States) Nicole Melichar-Martinez	Ekaterina Alexandrova (Czech Republic) Linda Nosková	2–6, 4–6
Loss	36–20	Aug 2026	Canadian Open, Canada	WTA 1000	Hard	(United States) Nicole Melichar-Martinez	(Czech Republic) Kateřina Siniaková (China) Zhang Shuai	3–6, 4–6
Win	37–20	Oct 2026	Pan Pacific Open, Japan	WTA 500	Hard	(Italy) Jasmine Paolini	(Canada) Gabriela Dabrowski (Brazil) Luisa Stefani	6–2, 6–2

== WTA 125 finals ==
=== Singles: 5 (2 titles, 3 runner-ups) ===
Result	W–L	Date	Tournament	Surface	Opponent	Score
Win	1–0	Mar 2018	WTA 125 Indian Wells, United States	Hard	(Ukraine) Kateryna Bondarenko	6–4, 6–2
Loss	1–1	Jun 2022	WTA 125 Gaiba, Italy	Grass	(Belgium) Alison Van Uytvanck	4–6, 3–6
Win	2–1	Jul 2022	WTA 125 Contrexéville, France	Clay	(Hungary) Dalma Gálfi	6–4, 1–6, 7–6^{(7–4)}
Loss	2–2	Apr 2023	WTA 125 San Luis Potosí, Mexico	Clay	(Italy) Elisabetta Cocciaretto	7–5, 4–6, 5–7
Loss	2–3	Sep 2023	WTA 125 Bucharest, Romania	Clay	(Australia) Astra Sharma	6–0, 5–7, 2–6

=== Doubles: 3 (2 titles, 1 runner-up) ===
Result	W–L	Date	Tournament	Surface	Partner	Opponents	Score
Win	1–0	Nov 2022	WTA 125 Buenos Aires, Argentina	Clay	(Romania) Irina Bara	(South Korea) Jang Su-jeong (China) You Xiaodi	6–1, 7–5
Win	2–0	Nov 2023	WTA 125 Florianópolis, Brazil	Clay	(France) Léolia Jeanjean	(Germany) Julia Lohoff (Switzerland) Conny Perrin	7–5, 3–6, [10–7]
Loss	2–1	Mar 2024	WTA 125 Charleston, United States	Hard	(Slovakia) Tereza Mihalíková	(Australia) Olivia Gadecki (United Kingdom) Olivia Nicholls	2–6, 1–6

== National team competition finals ==
=== Fed Cup: 4 (4 titles) ===
Result	W–L	Date	Tournament	Surface	Partners	Opponents	Opposing team	Score
Win	1–0	7–8 Nov 2009	Fed Cup, Reggio Calabria, Italy	Clay	(Italy) Flavia Pennetta (Italy) Francesca Schiavone (Italy) Roberta Vinci	United States	(United States) Melanie Oudin (United States) Alexa Glatch (United States) Liezel Huber (United States) Vania King	4–0
Win	2–0	6–7 Nov 2010	Fed Cup, San Diego, California, United States	Hard (i)	(Italy) Flavia Pennetta (Italy) Francesca Schiavone (Italy) Roberta Vinci	United States	(United States) Melanie Oudin (United States) CoCo Vandeweghe (United States) Bethanie Mattek-Sands (United States) Liezel Huber	3–1
Win	3–0	2–3 Nov 2013	Fed Cup, Cagliari, Italy	Clay	(Italy) Flavia Pennetta (Italy) Roberta Vinci (Italy) Karin Knapp	Russia	(Russia) Alexandra Panova (Russia) Alisa Kleybanova (Russia) Irina Khromacheva (Russia) Margarita Gasparyan	4–0
Win	4–0	14–20 Nov 2024	Billie Jean King Cup, Malaga, Spain	Hard (i)	(Italy) Jasmine Paolini (Italy) Martina Trevisan (Italy) Elisabetta Cocciaretto (Italy) Lucia Bronzetti	Slovakia	(Slovakia) Anna Karolína Schmiedlová (Slovakia) Rebecca Šramková (Slovakia) Viktória Hrunčáková (Slovakia) Renáta Jamrichová (Slovakia) Tereza Mihalíková	2–0

== ITF Circuit Finals ==
=== Singles: 8 (5 titles, 3 runner–ups) ===
Legend $100,000 tournaments (0–1) $50/60,000 tournaments (3–2) $25,000 tournaments (1–0) $10,000 tournaments (1–0)	Finals by surface Hard (3–1) Clay (2–2)

Result	W–L	Date	Tournament	Tier	Surface	Opponent	Score
Win	1–0	Feb 2005	ITF Melilla, Spain	10,000	Hard	(Spain) Lucia Jimenez-Almendros	6–1, 6–4
Win	2–0	Jun 2007	ITF Galatina, Italy	25,000	Clay	(Austria) Tina Schiechtl	6–1, 6–4
Loss	2–1	Jul 2007	ITF Cuneo, Italy	50,000	Clay	(Argentina) Maria-Emilia Salerni	6–3, 1–6, 6–7 ^{(6–8)}
Win	3–1	Oct 2017	ITF Suzhou, China	60,000	Hard	(China) Guo Hanyu	6–1, 6–0
Win	4–1	Jun 2019	ITF Rome, Italy	60,000	Clay	(Austria) Barbara Haas	6–1, 6–4
Loss	4–2	Nov 2019	ITF Asunción, Paraguay	60,000	Clay	(Italy) Elisabetta Cocciaretto	1–6, 6–4, 0–6
Win	5–2	Mar 2023	ITF Arcadia, United States	60,000	Hard	(Netherlands) Arantxa Rus	Walkover
Loss	5–3	Oct 2023	ITF Les Franqueses del Vallès, Spain	100,000	Hard	(Poland) Magdalena Fręch	5–7, 6–4, 4–6

=== Doubles: 11 (7 titles, 4 runner–ups) ===
Legend $50,000 tournaments (2–1) $25,000 tournaments (4–2) $10,000 tournaments (1–1)	Finals by surface Hard (2–0) Clay (4–4) Carpet (1–0)

Result	W–L	Date	Tournament	Tier	Surface	Partner	Opponents	Score
Loss	0–1	May 2003	ITF Lecce, Italy	10,000	Clay	(Italy) Nancy Rustignoli	(Romania) Oana Elena Golimbioschi (Czech Republic) Lenka Šnajdrová	3–6, ret.
Loss	0–2	Oct 2004	ITF Porto, Portugal	25,000	Clay	(Portugal) Joana Pangaio Pereira	(Ukraine) Yuliya Beygelzimer (Netherlands) Anousjka van Exel	5–7, 0–6
Win	1–2	Feb 2005	ITF Melilla, Spain	10,000	Hard	(Spain) María José Martínez Sánchez	(China) Sun Shengnan (China) Yang Shujing	6–7, 6–0, 7–5
Win	2–2	Apr 2005	ITF Torrent, Spain	25,000	Clay	(Italy) Paula García	(Spain) Núria Roig (Spain) Gabriela Velasco Andreu	6–7^{(5)}, 6–4, 6–2
Loss	2–3	Jul 2005	ITF Cuneo, Italy	50,000	Clay	(Italy) Giulia Gabba	(Ukraine) Mariya Koryttseva (Kazakhstan) Galina Voskoboeva	3–6, 5–7
Win	3–3	Oct 2005	ITF Sevilla, Spain	25,000	Clay	(Spain) María José Martínez Sánchez	(Romania) Gabriela Niculescu (Romania) Monica Niculescu	6–2, 7–6^{(5)}
Loss	3–4	Mar 2006	ITF Telde, Spain	25,000	Clay	(Italy) Giulia Gabba	(Russia) Nina Bratchikova (Russia) Alla Kudryavtseva	1–6, 1–6
Win	4–4	Jul 2006	ITF Cuneo, Italy	50,000	Clay	(Italy) Karin Knapp	(Italy) Giulia Gatto-Monticone (Belarus) Darya Kustova	6–3, 7–6^{(5)}
Win	5–4	Jan 2007	ITF Capriolo, Italy	25,000	Carpet (i)	(Italy) Giulia Gabba	(Ukraine) Mariya Koryttseva (Belarus) Darya Kustova	6–4, 7–5
Win	6–4	Mar 2007	ITF Latina, Italy	50,000	Hard	(Italy) Giulia Gabba	(France) Stéphanie Cohen-Aloro (Tunisia) Selima Sfar	6–3, 1–6, 7–6^{(2)}
Win	7–4	Oct 2019	ITF Riba-roja de Túria, Spain	25,000	Clay	(Spain) Lara Arruabarrena	(Belgium) Marie Benoît (Romania) Ioana Loredana Roșca	3–6, 6–4, [10–8]

== Wins against top 10 players ==
#	Player	Rank	Event	Surface	Rd	Score
2012
1.	(Germany) Angelique Kerber	10	French Open, France	Clay	QF	6–3, 7–6^{(7–2)}
2.	(Australia) Samantha Stosur	6	French Open, France	Clay	SF	7–5, 1–6, 6–3
3.	(Germany) Angelique Kerber	6	US Open, US	Hard	4R	7–6^{(7–5)}, 6–3
4.	(France) Marion Bartoli	10	Pan Pacific Open, Japan	Hard	3R	3–6, 6–2, 6–2
5.	(Australia) Samantha Stosur	9	WTA Tour Championships, Turkey	Hard (i)	RR	6–3, 2–6, 6–0
2013
6.	(Poland) Agnieszka Radwańska	4	French Open, France	Clay	QF	6–4, 7–6^{(8–6)}
7.	(Serbia) Jelena Janković	8	WTA Tour Championships, Turkey	Hard (i)	RR	6–4, 6–4
2014
8.	(China) Li Na	2	Italian Open, Italy	Clay	QF	6–3, 4–6, 6–2
9.	(Serbia) Jelena Janković	8	Italian Open, Italy	Clay	SF	6–3, 7–5
10.	(Serbia) Jelena Janković	7	French Open, France	Clay	4R	7–6^{(7–5)}, 6–2
2015
11.	(Poland) Agnieszka Radwańska	9	Stuttgart Open, Germany	Clay (i)	1R	7–6^{(10–8)}, 6–4
12.	(Germany) Andrea Petkovic	10	French Open, France	Clay	3R	6–3, 6–3
13.	(Czech Republic) Petra Kvitová	4	China Open, China	Hard	1R	7–5, 6–4

== Longest winning streaks ==
=== 21–match doubles winning streak (2012) ===
#	Tournament	Category	Start date	Surface	Partner	Rd	Opponent	Rank	Score
–	Fed Cup semifinal, Czech Republic	Fed Cup	21 Apr 2012	Hard (i)	(Italy) Flavia Pennetta	–	(Czech Republic) Andrea Hlaváčková (Czech Republic) Lucie Hradecká	8; 10	6–5 ret.
1	Madrid Open, Spain	Premier M	7 May 2012	Clay	(Italy) Roberta Vinci	1R	(Poland) Klaudia Jans-Ignacik (Russia) Alla Kudryavtseva	49; 35	6–4, 6–3
2	Madrid Open, Spain	Premier M	7 May 2012	Clay	(Italy) Roberta Vinci	2R	(Russia) Anastasia Pavlyuchenkova (WC) (Czech Republic) Lucie Šafářová (WC)	53; 60	6–1, 6–3
3	Madrid Open, Spain	Premier M	7 May 2012	Clay	(Italy) Roberta Vinci	QF	(Slovakia) Dominika Cibulková (WC) (Slovakia) Janette Husárová (WC)	119; 75	6–4, 7–5
4	Madrid Open, Spain	Premier M	7 May 2012	Clay	(Italy) Roberta Vinci	SF	(Russia) Maria Kirilenko (4) (Russia) Nadia Petrova (4)	11; 16	7–5, 6–7^{(4–7)}, [10–5]
5	Madrid Open, Spain	Premier M	7 May 2012	Clay	(Italy) Roberta Vinci	W	(Russia) Ekaterina Makarova (Russia) Elena Vesnina	41; 10	6–1, 3–6, [10–4]
–	Italian Open, Italy	Premier 5	14 May 2012	Clay	(Italy) Roberta Vinci	1R	bye		
6	Italian Open, Italy	Premier 5	14 May 2012	Clay	(Italy) Roberta Vinci	2R	(Argentina) Gisela Dulko (Argentina) Paola Suárez	14; 63	6–3, 6–4
7	Italian Open, Italy	Premier 5	14 May 2012	Clay	(Italy) Roberta Vinci	QF	(Russia) Maria Kirilenko (5) (Russia) Nadia Petrova (5)	13; 16	7–5, 6–2
8	Italian Open, Italy	Premier 5	14 May 2012	Clay	(Italy) Roberta Vinci	SF	(United States) Liezel Huber (1) (United States) Lisa Raymond (1)	1; 1	6–1, 6–3
9	Italian Open, Italy	Premier 5	14 May 2012	Clay	(Italy) Roberta Vinci	W	(Russia) Ekaterina Makarova (Russia) Elena Vesnina	25; 7	6–2, 7–5
10	French Open, France	Grand Slam	28 May 2012	Clay	(Italy) Roberta Vinci	1R	(Italy) Alberta Brianti (Austria) Patricia Mayr-Achleitner	73; NR	6–1, 6–3
11	French Open, France	Grand Slam	28 May 2012	Clay	(Italy) Roberta Vinci	2R	(Hungary) Tímea Babos (Chinese Taipei) Hsieh Su-wei	108; 52	6–4, 6–2
12	French Open, France	Grand Slam	28 May 2012	Clay	(Italy) Roberta Vinci	3R	(Russia) Nina Bratchikova (Alt) (Romania) Edina Gallovits-Hall (Alt)	75; 245	6–4, 6–2
13	French Open, France	Grand Slam	28 May 2012	Clay	(Italy) Roberta Vinci	QF	(Russia) Ekaterina Makarova (6) (Russia) Elena Vesnina (6)	17; 7	6–4, 5–7, 6–4
14	French Open, France	Grand Slam	28 May 2012	Clay	(Italy) Roberta Vinci	SF	(Spain) Nuria Llagostera Vives (12) (Spain) María José Martínez Sánchez (12)	18; 40	6–4, 6–2
15	French Open, France	Grand Slam	28 May 2012	Clay	(Italy) Roberta Vinci	W	(Russia) Maria Kirilenko (7) (Russia) Nadia Petrova (7)	12; 15	4–6, 6–4, 6–2
16	Rosmalen Championships, Netherlands	International	18 June 2012	Grass	(Italy) Roberta Vinci	1R	(Greece) Eleni Daniilidou (Japan) Rika Fujiwara	69; 65	6–1, 6–2
17	Rosmalen Championships, Netherlands	International	18 June 2012	Grass	(Italy) Roberta Vinci	QF	(Slovenia) Andreja Klepač (Australia) Anastasia Rodionova	63; 19	6–2, 6–4
18	Rosmalen Championships, Netherlands	International	18 June 2012	Grass	(Italy) Roberta Vinci	SF	(Slovakia) Dominika Cibulková (Czech Republic) Barbora Záhlavová-Strýcová	85; 20	3–6, 6–3, [10–6]
19	Rosmalen Championships, Netherlands	International	18 June 2012	Grass	(Italy) Roberta Vinci	W	(Russia) Maria Kirilenko (2) (Russia) Nadia Petrova (2)	7; 11	6–4, 3–6, [11–9]
20	Wimbledon, United Kingdom	Grand Slam	25 June 2012	Grass	(Italy) Roberta Vinci	1R	(Czech Republic) Eva Birnerová (Czech Republic) Petra Cetkovská	57; 131	6–2, 6–1
21	Wimbledon, United Kingdom	Grand Slam	25 June 2012	Grass	(Italy) Roberta Vinci	2R	(United States) Christina McHale (Austria) Tamira Paszek	113; 278	6–1, 6–3
–	Wimbledon, United Kingdom	Grand Slam	25 June 2012	Grass	(Italy) Roberta Vinci	3R	(Poland) Agnieszka Radwańska (Poland) Urszula Radwańska	43; 79	w/o
–	Wimbledon, United Kingdom	Grand Slam	25 June 2012	Grass	(Italy) Roberta Vinci	QF	(Czech Republic) Andrea Hlaváčková (6) (Czech Republic) Lucie Hradecká (6)	17; 13	3–6, 4–6

== See also ==
- Roberta Vinci career statistics
