= 2011 Barcelona Ladies Open – Doubles =

Doubles
- 2011 Barcelona Ladies Open

Final
- Champions: (Czech Republic) Iveta Benešová (Czech Republic) Barbora Záhlavová-Strýcová
- Runners-up: (South Africa) Natalie Grandin (Czech Republic) Vladimíra Uhlířová
- Score: 5–7, 6–4, [11–9]

Events
Singles	Doubles
← 2010 ·	Barcelona Ladies Open	· 2012 →

Sara Errani and Roberta Vinci were the defending champions, but Roberta Vinci chose not to continue her performance before the quarterfinals.
Czech pair Iveta Benešová and Barbora Záhlavová-Strýcová defeated Natalie Grandin and Vladimíra Uhlířová in the final 5–7, 6–4, [11–9] to claim the title.

== Seeds ==
The first seeds received a bye into the quarterfinals.

1. (Czech Republic) Iveta Benešová / (Czech Republic) Barbora Záhlavová-Strýcová (champions)
2. (Italy) Sara Errani / (Italy) Roberta Vinci (quarterfinals, retired Vinci right elbow injury)
3. (South Africa) Natalie Grandin / (Czech Republic) Vladimíra Uhlířová (final)
4. (Russia) Ekaterina Makarova / (Kazakhstan) Yaroslava Shvedova (quarterfinals, withdrew Makarova upper respiratory illness)

== Draw ==
=== Key ===
- Q = Qualifier
- WC = Wild card
- LL = Lucky loser
- Alt = Alternate
- SE = Special exempt
- PR = Protected ranking
- ITF = ITF entry
- JE = Junior exempt
- w/o = Walkover
- r = Retired
- d = Defaulted
- SR = Special ranking

=== Draw ===
First round
(Russia) N Bratchikova (Austria) S Klemenschits	6^{2}	6	[10]
(Russia) M Kondratieva (France) S Lefèvre	7	4	[6]
4	(Russia) E Makarova (Kazakhstan) Y Shvedova	6	4	[10]
(Russia) A Pivovarova (Spain) L Pous Tió	3	6	[7]
(United States) A Rolle (United States) M Washington	4	4
(Chinese Taipei) K-c Chang (United States) J Craybas	6	6
(Spain) E Cabeza Candela (Croatia) M Lučić	6	6
(Latvia) L Dekmeijere (United States) M Moulton-Levy	1	3
(Slovenia) A Klepač (Ukraine) O Savchuk	6^{5}	6	[8]
3	(South Africa) N Grandin (Czech Republic) V Uhlířová	7	1	[10]
(Australia) J Moore (Russia) E Rodina	2	0
(Uzbekistan) A Amanmuradova (Chinese Taipei) S-w Hsieh	6	6
(Italy) A Brianti (Italy) ME Camerin	1	2
2	(Italy) S Errani (Italy) R Vinci	6	6

Quarterfinals
1	(Czech Republic) I Benešová (Czech Republic) B Záhlavová-Strýcová	6	6
(Russia) N Bratchikova (Austria) S Klemenschits	3	1
4	(Russia) E Makarova (Kazakhstan) Y Shvedova
(Chinese Taipei) K-c Chang (United States) J Craybas	w/o
(Spain) E Cabeza Candela (Croatia) M Lučić	1	1
3	(South Africa) N Grandin (Czech Republic) V Uhlířová	6	6
(Uzbekistan) A Amanmuradova (Chinese Taipei) S-w Hsieh	2
2	(Italy) S Errani (Italy) R Vinci	3^{r}

Semifinals
1	(Czech Republic) I Benešová (Czech Republic) B Záhlavová-Strýcová	6	6
(Chinese Taipei) K-c Chang (United States) J Craybas	3	3
3	(South Africa) N Grandin (Czech Republic) V Uhlířová	6	6
(Uzbekistan) A Amanmuradova (Chinese Taipei) S-w Hsieh	4	4

Final
1	(Czech Republic) I Benešová (Czech Republic) B Záhlavová-Strýcová	5	6	[11]
3	(South Africa) N Grandin (Czech Republic) V Uhlířová	7	4	[9]
