= 2011 Barcelona Ladies Open – Singles qualifying =

This article displays the women qualifying draw of the 2011 Barcelona Ladies Open.

== Players ==
=== Seeds ===
1. (United States) Jamie Hampton (qualifying competition) (lucky loser)
2. (Italy) Maria Elena Camerin (qualifying competition) (lucky loser)
3. (Japan) Misaki Doi (first round)
4. (Slovakia) Zuzana Kučová (qualified)
5. (Ukraine) Olga Savchuk (first round)
6. (Chinese Taipei) Chang Kai-chen (qualified)
7. (Kazakhstan) Zarina Diyas (first round)
8. (Spain) Silvia Soler Espinosa (qualified)

=== Qualifiers ===
1. (Spain) Silvia Soler Espinosa
2. (Chinese Taipei) Chang Kai-chen
3. (Spain) Estrella Cabeza Candela
4. (Slovakia) Zuzana Kučová

=== Lucky losers ===
1. (United States) Jamie Hampton
2. (Italy) Maria Elena Camerin

== Qualifying draw ==
=== First qualifier ===
First round
1 | (United States) Jamie Hampton
Bye
(Spain) Pilar Domínguez-López | 1 | 0
8 | (Spain) Silvia Soler Espinosa | 6 | 6

Qualifying competition
1 | (United States) Jamie Hampton | 2 | 6^{3}
8 | (Spain) Silvia Soler Espinosa | 6 | 7

=== Second qualifier ===
First round
2 | (Italy) Maria Elena Camerin
Bye
WC | (France) Sophie Lefèvre | 2 | 1
6 | (Chinese Taipei) Chang Kai-chen | 6 | 6

Qualifying competition
2 | (Italy) Maria Elena Camerin | 2 | 6^{4}
6 | (Chinese Taipei) Chang Kai-chen | 6 | 7

=== Third qualifier ===
First round
3 | (Japan) Misaki Doi | 4 | 2
(Spain) Estrella Cabeza Candela | 6 | 6
(Spain) Leticia Costas-Moreira | 6 | 7
7 | (Kazakhstan) Zarina Diyas | 2 | 6^{6}

Qualifying competition
(Spain) Estrella Cabeza Candela | 6^{2} | 6 | 6
(Spain) Leticia Costas-Moreira | 7 | 3 | 0

=== Fourth qualifier ===
First round
4 | (Slovakia) Zuzana Kučová | 6 | 1 | 6
WC | (Russia) Maria Kondratieva | 4 | 6 | 3
(Spain) Lara Arruabarrena-Vecino | 6 | 7
5 | (Ukraine) Olga Savchuk | 0 | 5

Qualifying competition
4 | (Slovakia) Zuzana Kučová | 6 | 6
(Spain) Lara Arruabarrena-Vecino | 4 | 3
