= 2011 Barcelona Ladies Open – Singles =

Singles
- 2011 Barcelona Ladies Open

Final
- Champion: (Italy) Roberta Vinci
- Runner-up: (Czech Republic) Lucie Hradecká
- Score: 4–6, 6–2, 6–2

Events
Singles	Doubles
← 2010 ·	Barcelona Ladies Open	· 2012 →

Francesca Schiavone was the defending champion, but chose not to compete.
Roberta Vinci reached her third final in a row here and won against Lucie Hradecká, 4–6, 6–2, 6–2.

== Seeds ==
1. (France) Marion Bartoli (first round)
2. (Romania) Alexandra Dulgheru (second round)
3. (Bulgaria) Tsvetana Pironkova (first round)
4. (Russia) Ekaterina Makarova (first round)
5. (Italy) Sara Errani (semifinals)
6. (Italy) Roberta Vinci (champion)
7. (Czech Republic) Iveta Benešová (first round)
8. (Spain) ~~Lourdes Domínguez Lino~~ (withdrew due to a foot injury)
9. (Czech Republic) Barbora Záhlavová-Strýcová (first round)

== Draw ==
=== Key ===
- Q = Qualifier
- WC = Wild card
- LL = Lucky loser
- Alt = Alternate
- SE = Special exempt
- PR = Protected ranking
- ITF = ITF entry
- JE = Junior exempt
- w/o = Walkover
- r = Retired
- d = Defaulted
- SR = Special ranking

=== Finals ===
Semifinals
6	(Italy) Roberta Vinci	4	6	7
(Spain) Laura Pous Tió	6	4	6^{4}
5	(Italy) Sara Errani	1	5
(Czech Republic) Lucie Hradecká	6	7

Final
6	(Italy) Roberta Vinci	4	6	6
(Czech Republic) Lucie Hradecká	6	2	2

=== Top half ===
First round
1/WC	(France) M Bartoli	4	1
(Slovakia) M Rybáriková	6	6
WC	(Spain) N Llagostera Vives	5	4
(France) V Razzano	7	6
(Kazakhstan) Y Shvedova	6	2	6
Q	(Chinese Taipei) K-c Chang	3	6	2
Q	(Spain) S Soler Espinosa	2	3
6	(Italy) R Vinci	6	6
4	(Russia) E Makarova	6^{4}	3
(Croatia) M Lučić	7	6
(Slovenia) P Hercog	6	7
LL	(United States) J Hampton	4	5
(United States) J Craybas	6	6
(Uzbekistan) A Amanmuradova	3	3
(Spain) L Pous Tió	6	6
9	(Czech Republic) B Záhlavová-Strýcová	3	3

Second round
(Slovakia) M Rybáriková	6^{6}	6	2
(France) V Razzano	7	1	6
(Kazakhstan) Y Shvedova	1	4
6	(Italy) R Vinci	6	6
(Croatia) M Lučić	1	2
(Slovenia) P Hercog	6	6
(United States) J Craybas	1	1
(Spain) L Pous Tió	6	6

Quarterfinals
(France) V Razzano	4	1
6	(Italy) R Vinci	6	6
(Slovenia) P Hercog	7	1	5
(Spain) L Pous Tió	6^{7}	6	7

Semifinals
6	(Italy) R Vinci	4	6	7
(Spain) L Pous Tió	6	4	6^{4}

=== Bottom half ===
First round
5	(Italy) S Errani	6	6
WC	(Spain) M-T Torró-Flor	1	0
(Russia) E Rodina	4	5
LL	(Italy) ME Camerin	6	7
(United Kingdom) E Baltacha	7	1	2
(United States) V Lepchenko	6^{3}	6	6
(Italy) A Brianti	6	6
3	(Bulgaria) T Pironkova	1	2
7	(Czech Republic) I Benešová	4	4
(Czech Republic) L Hradecká	6	6
(Argentina) G Dulko	7	6
(Japan) K Date-Krumm	5	4
(Spain) A Parra Santonja	3	5
Q	(Spain) E Cabeza Candela	6	7
Q	(Slovakia) Z Kučová	1	0^{r}
2	(Romania) A Dulgheru	6	5

Second round
5	(Italy) S Errani	6	6
LL	(Italy) ME Camerin	4	1
(United States) V Lepchenko	0	7	2
(Italy) A Brianti	6	5	6
(Czech Republic) L Hradecká	6	6
(Argentina) G Dulko	4	3
Q	(Spain) E Cabeza Candela	7	6
2	(Romania) A Dulgheru	5	3

Quarterfinals
5	(Italy) S Errani	6	6
(Italy) A Brianti	2	3
(Czech Republic) L Hradecká	6	6
Q	(Spain) E Cabeza Candela	4	4

Semifinals
5	(Italy) S Errani	1	5
(Czech Republic) L Hradecká	6	7
