= 2010 Barcelona Ladies Open =

- Date: 10–17 April
- Edition: 4th
- Category: WTA International
- Draw: 32S / 16D
- Prize money: $220,000
- Surface: Clay / outdoor
- Location: Barcelona, Catalonia, Spain
- Venue: David Lloyd Club Turó

Champions

Singles
- (Italy) Francesca Schiavone

Doubles
- (Italy) Sara Errani / (Italy) Roberta Vinci
← 2009 ·	Barcelona Ladies Open	· 2011 →

The 2010 Barcelona Ladies Open was a women's tennis tournament played on outdoor clay courts. It was the 4th edition of the Barcelona Ladies Open, and an International-level tournament on the 2010 WTA Tour. It took place at the David Lloyd Club Turó in Barcelona, Catalonia, Spain, from 10 April through 17 April 2010. First-seeded Francesca Schiavone won the singles title.

== Finals ==
=== Singles ===
(Italy) Francesca Schiavone defeated (Italy) Roberta Vinci, 6–1, 6-1

- It was Schiavone's first title of the year and 3rd of her career.

=== Doubles ===
(Italy) Sara Errani / (Italy) Roberta Vinci defeated (Switzerland) Timea Bacsinszky / (Italy) Tathiana Garbin, 6–1, 3–6, [10–2]

- It was Errani's fourth doubles title and Vinci's fifth doubles title. It was also the second title of the team this year.

== Entrants ==
=== Seeds ===
Athlete	Nationality	Ranking*	Seeding
Francesca Schiavone	Italy	17	1
Aravane Rezaï	France	20	2
María José Martínez Sánchez	Spain	28	3
Maria Kirilenko	Russia	31	4
Sorana Cîrstea	Romania	36	5
Gisela Dulko	Argentina	37	6
Carla Suárez Navarro	Spain	38	7
Lucie Šafářová	Czech Republic	40	8

- Rankings are as of April 5, 2010.

=== Other entrants ===
The following players received wildcards into the main draw:

- (Spain) Lourdes Domínguez Lino
- (Spain) Arantxa Parra Santonja
- (Spain) Laura Pous Tió

The following players received entry from the qualifying draw:

- (France) Alizé Cornet
- (Romania) Simona Halep
- (Spain) Sílvia Soler Espinosa
- (Slovenia) Maša Zec Peškirič
