= 2010 Barcelona Ladies Open – Doubles =

Doubles
- 2010 Barcelona Ladies Open

Final
- Champions: (Italy) Sara Errani (Italy) Roberta Vinci
- Runners-up: (Switzerland) Timea Bacsinszky (Italy) Tathiana Garbin
- Score: 6–1, 3–6, [10–2]

Events
Singles	Doubles
← 2009 ·	Barcelona Ladies Open	· 2011 →

Nuria Llagostera Vives and María José Martínez Sánchez are the defending champions.
Sara Errani and Roberta Vinci won in the final 6–1, 3–6, [10–2] against Timea Bacsinszky and Tathiana Garbin.

== Seeds ==
1. (Spain) Nuria Llagostera Vives / (Spain) María José Martínez Sánchez (semifinals)
2. (Romania) Sorana Cîrstea / (Argentina) Gisela Dulko (first round)
3. (Poland) Klaudia Jans / (Czech Republic) Vladimíra Uhlířová (quarterfinals)
4. (Italy) Sara Errani / (Italy) Roberta Vinci (champions)

== Draw ==
=== Key ===
- Q = Qualifier
- WC = Wild card
- LL = Lucky loser
- Alt = Alternate
- SE = Special exempt
- PR = Protected ranking
- ITF = ITF entry
- JE = Junior exempt
- w/o = Walkover
- r = Retired
- d = Defaulted
- SR = Special ranking

=== Draw ===
First round
1	(Spain) N Llagostera Vives (Spain) MJ Martínez Sánchez	6	6
(Belarus) T Poutchek (Turkey) İ Şenoğlu	3	4
(Czech Republic) I Benešová (France) S Foretz	7	6
WC	(Spain) E Cabeza Candela (Spain) L Pous Tió	6^{2}	3
4	(Italy) S Errani (Italy) R Vinci	7	6
(Germany) K Barrois (Romania) IR Olaru	6^{2}	3
(Spain) A Medina Garrigues (Spain) C Suárez Navarro
(Greece) E Daniilidou (Germany) J Wöhr	w/o
(Poland) A Rosolska (United States) R Zalameda	5	0
(Switzerland) T Bacsinszky (Italy) T Garbin	7	6
(Romania) M Niculescu (United States) M Shaughnessy	4	4
3	(Poland) K Jans (Czech Republic) V Uhlířová	6	6
(Russia) M Kondratieva (Kazakhstan) Y Shvedova	6	6
WC	(Spain) L Domínguez Lino (Spain) A Parra Santonja	0	4
(Germany) T Malek (Germany) A Petkovic	6	7
2	(Romania) S Cîrstea (Argentina) G Dulko	3	5

Quarterfinals
1	(Spain) N Llagostera Vives (Spain) MJ Martínez Sánchez	6	6
(Czech Republic) I Benešová (France) S Foretz	2	4
4	(Italy) S Errani (Italy) R Vinci	6	6
(Greece) E Daniilidou (Germany) J Wöhr	3	2
(Switzerland) T Bacsinszky (Italy) T Garbin	6	6
3	(Poland) K Jans (Czech Republic) V Uhlířová	3	4
(Russia) M Kondratieva (Kazakhstan) Y Shvedova	3	4
(Germany) T Malek (Germany) A Petkovic	6	6

Semifinals
1	(Spain) N Llagostera Vives (Spain) MJ Martínez Sánchez	6	1	[7]
4	(Italy) S Errani (Italy) R Vinci	3	6	[10]
(Switzerland) T Bacsinszky (Italy) T Garbin	7	6
(Germany) T Malek (Germany) A Petkovic	5	3

Finals
4	(Italy) S Errani (Italy) R Vinci	6	3	[10]
(Switzerland) T Bacsinszky (Italy) T Garbin	1	6	[2]
