= 2012 Barcelona Ladies Open – Doubles =

Doubles
- 2012 Barcelona Ladies Open

Final
- Champions: (Italy) Sara Errani (Italy) Roberta Vinci
- Runners-up: (Italy) Flavia Pennetta (Italy) Francesca Schiavone
- Score: 6–0, 6–2

Events
Singles	Doubles
← 2011 ·	Barcelona Ladies Open	· 2013 →

Iveta Benešová and Barbora Záhlavová-Strýcová were the defending champions but Benešová decided not to participate.
Záhlavová-Strýcová plays alongside Petra Cetkovská, but they were knocked out in the semifinals by the top-seeded pair of Sara Errani and Roberta Vinci who beat Francesca Schiavone and Flavia Pennetta 6–0, 6–2 in an all-Italian final.

== Seeds ==
1. (Italy) Sara Errani / (Italy) Roberta Vinci (champions)
2. (Spain) Nuria Llagostera Vives / (Spain) Arantxa Parra Santonja (first round)
3. (Belarus) Olga Govortsova / (Czech Republic) Vladimíra Uhlířová (first round)
4. (Russia) Nina Bratchikova / (Croatia) Darija Jurak (first round)

== Draw ==
=== Key ===
- Q = Qualifier
- WC = Wild card
- LL = Lucky loser
- Alt = Alternate
- SE = Special exempt
- PR = Protected ranking
- ITF = ITF entry
- JE = Junior exempt
- w/o = Walkover
- r = Retired
- d = Defaulted
- SR = Special ranking

=== Draw ===
First round
1	(Italy) S Errani (Italy) R Vinci	6	6
(Belarus) D Kustova (Ukraine) O Savchuk	0	3
(Spain) L Arruabarrena Vecino (United States) S Stephens	7	2	[3]
(Romania) S Halep (Slovakia) J Husárová	5	6	[10]
4	(Russia) N Bratchikova (Croatia) D Jurak	1	2
(Czech Republic) P Cetkovská (Czech Republic) B Záhlavová-Strýcová	6	6
WC	(Spain) S Soler Espinosa (Spain) C Suárez Navarro	3	6	[10]
WC	(Spain) E Cabeza Candela (Spain) I Ferrer Suárez	6	1	[2]
(Romania) S Cîrstea (Czech Republic) K Zakopalová	5	6	[6]
(Italy) F Pennetta (Italy) F Schiavone	7	4	[10]
(Israel) S Pe'er (Argentina) P Suárez	6	2	[10]
3	(Belarus) O Govortsova (Czech Republic) V Uhlířová	2	6	[8]
(Romania) E Bogdan (Romania) A Cadanțu	7	3	[6]
(Romania) I-C Begu (Spain) L Domínguez Lino	5	6	[10]
(Bosnia and Herzegovina) M Jugić-Salkić (Austria) S Klemenschits	7^{9}	6
2	(Spain) N Llagostera Vives (Spain) A Parra Santonja	6^{7}	3

Quarterfinals
1	(Italy) S Errani (Italy) R Vinci	6	6
(Romania) S Halep (Slovakia) J Husárová	3	1
(Czech Republic) P Cetkovská (Czech Republic) B Záhlavová-Strýcová	6	7
WC	(Spain) S Soler Espinosa (Spain) C Suárez Navarro	2	5
(Italy) F Pennetta (Italy) F Schiavone	6	3	[10]
(Israel) S Pe'er (Argentina) P Suárez	1	6	[8]
(Romania) I-C Begu (Spain) L Domínguez Lino	6	6
(Bosnia and Herzegovina) M Jugić-Salkić (Austria) S Klemenschits	3	3

Semifinals
1	(Italy) S Errani (Italy) R Vinci	6	6
(Czech Republic) P Cetkovská (Czech Republic) B Záhlavová-Strýcová	2	0
(Italy) F Pennetta (Italy) F Schiavone	7	6
(Romania) I-C Begu (Spain) L Domínguez Lino	5	2

Final
1	(Italy) S Errani (Italy) R Vinci	6	6
(Italy) F Pennetta (Italy) F Schiavone	0	2
