= 2012 Barcelona Ladies Open – Singles =

Singles
- 2012 Barcelona Ladies Open

Final
- Champion: (Italy) Sara Errani
- Runner-up: (Slovakia) Dominika Cibulková
- Score: 6–2, 6–2

Events
Singles	Doubles
← 2011 ·	Barcelona Ladies Open	· 2013 →

Roberta Vinci was the defending champion, but lost in the second round to Simona Halep 6–1, 6–3. Sara Errani won the tournament, beating Dominika Cibulková 6–2, 6–2 in the final.

== Seeds ==
1. (Italy) Francesca Schiavone (first round)
2. (Germany) Julia Görges (quarterfinals)
3. (Slovakia) Dominika Cibulková (final)
4. (Italy) Roberta Vinci (second round)
5. (Italy) Flavia Pennetta (second round)
6. (Czech Republic) Petra Cetkovská (second round)
7. (Italy) Sara Errani (champion)
8. (Slovenia) Polona Hercog (first round, retired)

== Draw ==
=== Key ===
- Q = Qualifier
- WC = Wild card
- LL = Lucky loser
- Alt = Alternate
- SE = Special exempt
- PR = Protected ranking
- ITF = ITF entry
- JE = Junior exempt
- w/o = Walkover
- r = Retired
- d = Defaulted
- SR = Special ranking

=== Finals ===
Semifinals
(Romania) Sorana Cîrstea	1	1
3	(Slovakia) Dominika Cibulková	6	6
(Spain) Carla Suárez Navarro	1	2
7	(Italy) Sara Errani	6	6

Final
3	(Slovakia) Dominika Cibulková	2	2
7	(Italy) Sara Errani	6	6

=== Top half ===
First round
1/WC	(Italy) F Schiavone	4	3
(Belarus) O Govortsova	6	6
(Spain) L Pous Tió	6	6
(Czech Republic) B Záhlavová-Strýcová	1	2
(Spain) S Soler Espinosa	1	2
(Spain) L Domínguez Lino	6	6
(Romania) S Cîrstea	6	0
8	(Slovenia) P Hercog	4	0^{r}
3	(Slovakia) D Cibulková	6	6
(France) I Brémond	0	3
Q	(France) L Thorpe	3	4
(Czech Republic) K Zakopalová	6	6
Q	(Ukraine) Y Beygelzimer	6	7^{7}
(Romania) A Cadanțu	3	6^{4}
(Spain) L Arruabarrena Vecino	0	4
5/WC	(Italy) F Pennetta	6	6

Second round
(Belarus) O Govortsova	7^{7}	6^{6}	6
(Spain) L Pous Tió	6^{4}	7^{8}	2
(Spain) L Domínguez Lino	6	3	1
(Romania) S Cîrstea	1	6	6
3	(Slovakia) D Cibulková	5	6	6
(Czech Republic) K Zakopalová	7	4	4
Q	(Ukraine) Y Beygelzimer	6	6^{5}	6
5/WC	(Italy) F Pennetta	2	7^{7}	4

Quarterfinals
(Belarus) O Govortsova	6	1	3
(Romania) S Cîrstea	2	6	6
3	(Slovakia) D Cibulková	3	6	6
Q	(Ukraine) Y Beygelzimer	6	0	0

Semifinals
(Romania) S Cîrstea	1	1
3	(Slovakia) D Cibulková	6	6

=== Bottom half ===
First round
6	(Czech Republic) P Cetkovská	6	5	7
(Israel) S Pe'er	1	7	5
Q	(Italy) A Bona	3	1
(Spain) C Suárez Navarro	6	6
(Romania) S Halep	6	6
(United States) S Stephens	4	4
(France) M Johansson	6	1	1
4	(Italy) R Vinci	1	6	6
7	(Italy) S Errani	7^{7}	6
(Romania) I-C Begu	6^{5}	4
LL	(Spain) E Cabeza Candela	6	7
(Russia) N Bratchikova	2	5
WC	(Spain) G Muguruza Blanco	6	6
WC	(Spain) A Parra Santonja	3	3
Q	(France) A Rezaï	4	0
2	(Germany) J Görges	6	6

Second round
6	(Czech Republic) P Cetkovská	2	4
(Spain) C Suárez Navarro	6	6
(Romania) S Halep	6	6
4	(Italy) R Vinci	1	3
7	(Italy) S Errani	6	6
LL	(Spain) E Cabeza Candela	0	2
WC	(Spain) G Muguruza Blanco	5	7	2
2	(Germany) J Görges	7	5	6

Quarterfinals
(Spain) C Suárez Navarro	6	6
(Romania) S Halep	4	1
7	(Italy) S Errani	6	6
2	(Germany) J Görges	2	3

Semifinals
(Spain) C Suárez Navarro	1	2
7	(Italy) S Errani	6	6

== Qualifying ==
=== Seeds ===
1. (Netherlands) Arantxa Rus (first round)
2. (Italy) Karin Knapp (first round)
3. (France) Aravane Rezaï (qualified)
4. (Spain) Estrella Cabeza Candela (qualifying competition, lucky loser)
5. (Russia) Anastasia Pivovarova (first round)
6. (Slovenia) Petra Rampre (qualifying competition)
7. (Russia) Ekaterina Ivanova (second round)
8. (Italy) Maria Elena Camerin (qualifying competition)

=== Qualifiers ===
1. (Italy) Annalisa Bona
2. (Ukraine) Yuliya Beygelzimer
3. (France) Aravane Rezaï
4. (France) Laura Thorpe

=== Draw ===
==== First qualifier ====
First round
1	(Netherlands) Arantxa Rus	4	1
(Italy) Nastassja Burnett	6	6
(Spain) Inés Ferrer Suárez	6	4	0
(Spain) Eva Fernández-Brugués	3	6	6
(Italy) Annalisa Bona	6^{6}	6	6
(Russia) Marta Sirotkina	7^{8}	2	2
(Italy) Corinna Dentoni	4	4
7	(Russia) Ekaterina Ivanova	6	6

Second round
(Italy) Nastassja Burnett	6	1	3
(Spain) Eva Fernández-Brugués	3	6	6
(Italy) Annalisa Bona	6	0
7	(Russia) Ekaterina Ivanova	1	0^{r}

Qualifying competition
(Spain) Eva Fernández-Brugués	2	2
(Italy) Annalisa Bona	6	6

==== Second qualifier ====
First round
2	(Italy) Karin Knapp	3	0
(Ukraine) Yuliya Beygelzimer	6	6
WC	(Spain) Sara Sorribes Tormo	3	6	1
(Croatia) Ani Mijačika	6	3	6
(France) Victoria Larrière	4	0
(Turkey) Çağla Büyükakçay	6	6
(France) Séverine Beltrame	3	6^{3}
6	(Slovenia) Petra Rampre	6	7^{7}

Second round
(Ukraine) Yuliya Beygelzimer	7	6
(Croatia) Ani Mijačika	5	2
(Turkey) Çağla Büyükakçay	3	1
6	(Slovenia) Petra Rampre	6	6

Qualifying competition
(Ukraine) Yuliya Beygelzimer	6	6
6	(Slovenia) Petra Rampre	3	2

==== Third qualifier ====
First round
3	(France) Aravane Rezaï	2	6	6
WC	(Spain) Beatriz García Vidagany	6	3	4
(Czech Republic) Sandra Záhlavová	6	1	6^{4}
WC	(Spain) María-Teresa Torró-Flor	4	6	7^{7}
(Romania) Elena Bogdan	3	6	6
(Germany) Dinah Pfizenmaier	6	0	2
(Slovakia) Romana Tabak	2	2
8	(Italy) Maria Elena Camerin	6	6

Second round
3	(France) Aravane Rezaï	3	7^{7}	7
WC	(Spain) María-Teresa Torró-Flor	6	6^{1}	5
(Romania) Elena Bogdan	6	4	3
8	(Italy) Maria Elena Camerin	4	6	6

Qualifying competition
3	(France) Aravane Rezaï	7^{7}	6
8	(Italy) Maria Elena Camerin	6^{3}	1

==== Fourth qualifier ====
First round
4	(Spain) Estrella Cabeza Candela	6	6
(Ukraine) Olga Savchuk	3	3
(Georgia (country)) Margalita Chakhnashvili	6	7
(Portugal) Maria João Koehler	2	5
WC	(Spain) Miriam Civera Lima	3	5
(Italy) Anna Floris	6	7
(France) Laura Thorpe	6	6
5	(Russia) Anastasia Pivovarova	0	4

Second round
4	(Spain) Estrella Cabeza Candela	6	6^{1}	6
(Georgia (country)) Margalita Chakhnashvili	3	7^{7}	2
(Italy) Anna Floris	3	0
(France) Laura Thorpe	6	6

Qualifying competition
4	(Spain) Estrella Cabeza Candela	6^{4}	6	6^{0}
(France) Laura Thorpe	7^{7}	4	7^{7}
