= 2010 Barcelona Ladies Open – Singles =

Singles
- 2010 Barcelona Ladies Open

Final
- Champion: (Italy) Francesca Schiavone
- Runner-up: (Italy) Roberta Vinci
- Score: 6–1, 6–1

Events
Singles	Doubles
← 2009 ·	Barcelona Ladies Open	· 2011 →

Roberta Vinci was the defending champion, but lost in the final to Francesca Schiavone, 6–1, 6–1.

== Seeds ==
1. (Italy) Francesca Schiavone (champion)
2. (France) Aravane Rezaï (first round)
3. (Spain) María José Martínez Sánchez (second round)
4. (Russia) Maria Kirilenko (second round)
5. (Romania) Sorana Cîrstea (second round)
6. (Argentina) Gisela Dulko (first round)
7. (Spain) Carla Suárez Navarro (quarterfinals)
8. (Czech Republic) Lucie Šafářová (first round)

== Draw ==
=== Key ===
- Q = Qualifier
- WC = Wild card
- LL = Lucky loser
- Alt = Alternate
- SE = Special exempt
- PR = Protected ranking
- ITF = ITF entry
- JE = Junior exempt
- w/o = Walkover
- r = Retired
- d = Defaulted
- SR = Special ranking

=== Finals ===
Semifinals
1	(Italy) Francesca Schiavone	6	6
(Kazakhstan) Yaroslava Shvedova	1	2
(Romania) Alexandra Dulgheru	7	1	2
(Italy) Roberta Vinci	6^{4}	6	6

Final
1	(Italy) Francesca Schiavone	6	6
(Italy) Roberta Vinci	1	1

=== Top half ===
First round
1	(Italy) F Schiavone	6	6
(Italy) A Brianti	2	1
(Czech Republic) L Hradecká	4	5
(Italy) T Garbin	6	7
(Germany) K Barrois	7	6
(Belgium) K Flipkens	5	2
Q	(Romania) S Halep	4	6	3
7	(Spain) C Suárez Navarro	6	3	6
4	(Russia) M Kirilenko	7	6
Q	(Slovenia) M Zec Peškirič	5	1
(Spain) A Medina Garrigues	1	4
(Kazakhstan) Y Shvedova	6	6
(Czech Republic) P Kvitová	1	4
(Czech Republic) I Benešová	6	6
(Austria) T Paszek	4	6^{6}
5	(Romania) S Cîrstea	6	7

Second round
1	(Italy) F Schiavone	6	6
(Italy) T Garbin	4	3
(Germany) K Barrois	3	5
7	(Spain) C Suárez Navarro	6	7
4	(Russia) M Kirilenko	6	2	2
(Kazakhstan) Y Shvedova	4	6	6
(Czech Republic) I Benešová	6	6
5	(Romania) S Cîrstea	1	3

Quarterfinals
1	(Italy) F Schiavone	6	6
7	(Spain) C Suárez Navarro	4	4
(Kazakhstan) Y Shvedova	6	6
(Czech Republic) I Benešová	4	4

Semifinals
1	(Italy) F Schiavone	6	6
(Kazakhstan) Y Shvedova	1	2

=== Bottom half ===
First round
6	(Argentina) G Dulko	6	1	6^{4}
(Italy) S Errani	2	6	7
Q	(Spain) S Soler Espinosa	2	1
(Romania) A Dulgheru	6	6
(Switzerland) S Vögele	4	6	4
WC	(Spain) A Parra Santonja	6	4	6
(Germany) A Petkovic	4	4
3	(Spain) MJ Martínez Sánchez	6	6
8	(Czech Republic) L Šafářová	3	6^{4}
(Russia) R Kulikova	6	7
(Switzerland) T Bacsinszky	7	6
Q	(France) A Cornet	5	3
WC	(Spain) L Pous Tió	4	6	6
WC	(Spain) L Domínguez Lino	6	3	3
(Italy) R Vinci	6	6
2	(France) A Rezaï	3	4

Second round
(Italy) S Errani	6	3	6^{5}
(Romania) A Dulgheru	2	6	7
WC	(Spain) A Parra Santonja	7	3	7
3	(Spain) MJ Martínez Sánchez	5	6	5
(Russia) R Kulikova	6	2	3
(Switzerland) T Bacsinszky	2	6	6
WC	(Spain) L Pous Tió	6	0	3
(Italy) R Vinci	4	6	6

Quarterfinals
(Romania) A Dulgheru	5	6	6
WC	(Spain) A Parra Santonja	7	2	4
(Switzerland) T Bacsinszky	3	0
(Italy) R Vinci	6	6

Semifinals
(Romania) A Dulgheru	7	1	2
(Italy) R Vinci	6^{4}	6	6
