= 2011 Barcelona Ladies Open =

- Date: April 25 – May 1
- Edition: 5th

Champions

Singles
- (Italy) Roberta Vinci

Doubles
- (Czech Republic) Iveta Benešová / (Czech Republic) Barbora Záhlavová-Strýcová
← 2010 ·	Barcelona Ladies Open	· 2012 →

The 2011 Barcelona Ladies Open was a tennis tournament played on outdoor clay courts. It was the 5th edition of the Barcelona Ladies Open, and an International-level tournament on the 2011 WTA Tour. It took place at the Tennis de la Vall d'Hebron in Barcelona, Catalonia, Spain, from April 25 through May 1, 2011.

== Entrants ==
=== Seeds ===
Country	Player	Rank^{1}	Seed
FRA	Marion Bartoli	12	1
ROU	Alexandra Dulgheru	28	2
BUL	Tsvetana Pironkova	35	3
RUS	Ekaterina Makarova	38	4
ITA	Sara Errani	41	5
ITA	Roberta Vinci	42	6
CZE	Iveta Benešová	44	7
ESP	~~Lourdes Domínguez Lino~~	45	~~8~~
CZE	Barbora Záhlavová-Strýcová	47	9

- Rankings are as of April 18, 2011.

=== Other entrants ===
The following players received wildcards into the main draw:

- (France) Marion Bartoli
- (Spain) Nuria Llagostera Vives
- (Spain) María-Teresa Torró-Flor

The following players received entry from the qualifying draw:

- (Spain) Estrella Cabeza Candela
- (Chinese Taipei) Chang Kai-chen
- (Slovakia) Zuzana Kučová
- (Spain) Silvia Soler Espinosa

The following players received entry from a lucky loser spot:

- (Italy) Maria Elena Camerin
- (United States) Jamie Hampton

=== Withdrawals ===
- (Switzerland) Timea Bacsinszky (ankle injury)
- (Spain) Lourdes Domínguez Lino (foot injury)

== Champions ==
=== Singles ===
(Italy) Roberta Vinci def. (Czech Republic) Lucie Hradecká, 4–6, 6–2, 6–2

- It was Vinci's 1st title of the year and 4th of her career. It was her 2nd win at the event, also winning in 2009.

=== Doubles ===
(Czech Republic) Iveta Benešová / (Czech Republic) Barbora Záhlavová-Strýcová def. (South Africa) Natalie Grandin / (Czech Republic) Vladimíra Uhlířová, 5–7, 6–4, [11–9]
