= Roberta Vinci =

Italian tennis player (born 1983)

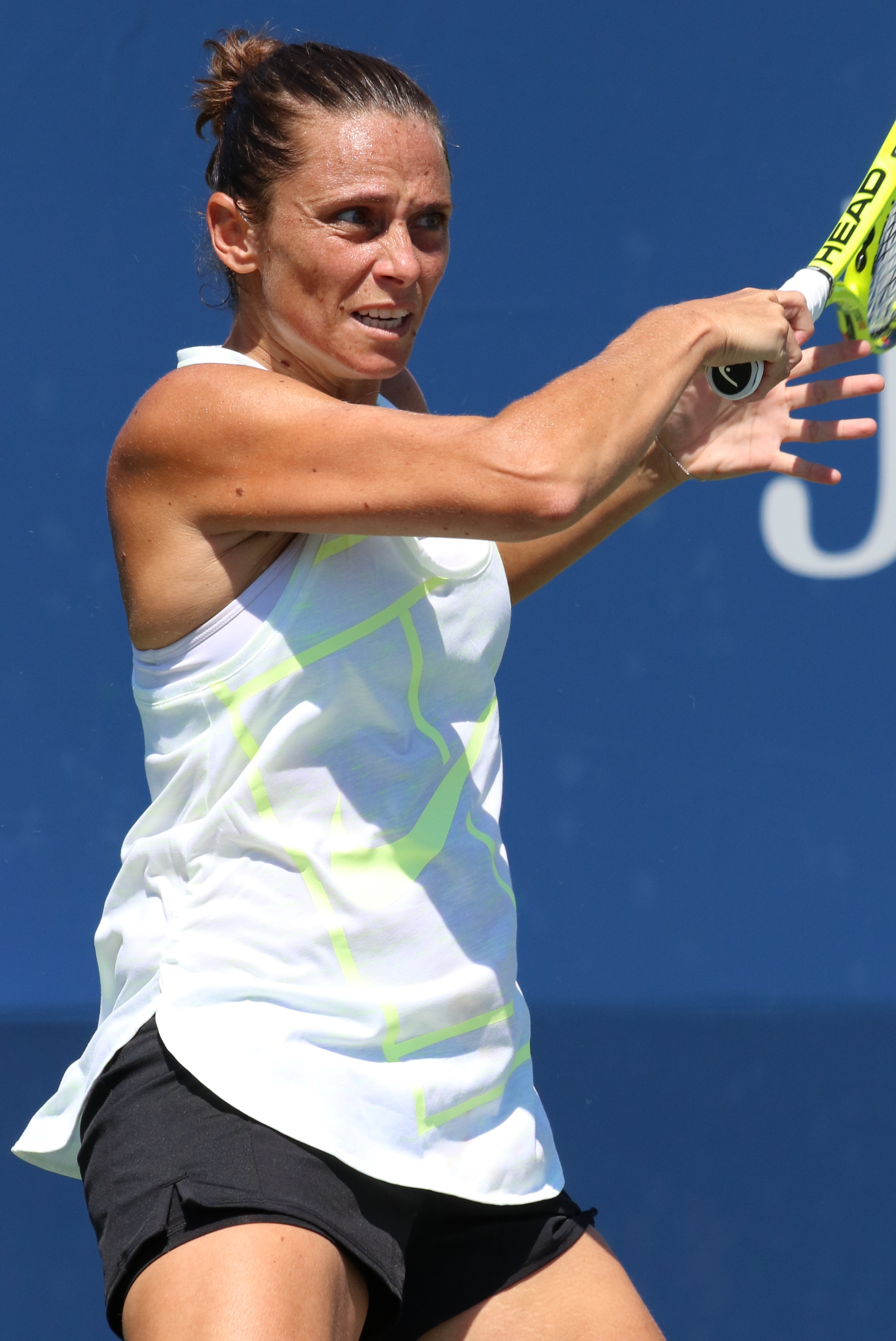
- Vinci at the 2016 US Open
- Country (sports): Italy
- Residence: Palermo, Italy
- Born: 18 February 1983 (age 43) Taranto, Italy
- Height: 1.63 m (5 ft 4 in)
- Turned pro: 1999
- Retired: 14 May 2018
- Plays: Right-handed (one-handed backhand)
- Prize money: $11,808,215

Singles
- Career record: 565–412
- Career titles: 10
- Highest ranking: No. 7 (9 May 2016)

Grand Slam singles results
- Australian Open: 3R (2006, 2010, 2013, 2016)
- French Open: 4R (2013)
- Wimbledon: 4R (2012, 2013)
- US Open: F (2015)

Doubles
- Career record: 415–205
- Career titles: 25
- Highest ranking: No. 1 (15 October 2012)

Grand Slam doubles results
- Australian Open: W (2013, 2014)
- French Open: W (2012)
- Wimbledon: W (2014)
- US Open: W (2012)

Other doubles tournaments
- Tour Finals: SF (2012, 2013)

Team competitions
- Fed Cup: W (2006, 2009, 2010, 2013) record 23–8

Roberta Vinci (Italian pronunciation: [roˈbɛrta ˈvintʃi]; born 18 February 1983) is an Italian former tennis player. In doubles tennis, she is a Career Grand Slam champion having won all major tournaments and reached the world No. 1 position. She also reached a career-high singles ranking of world No. 7, in May 2016. At the 2015 US Open, she defeated world No. 1 Serena Williams in the semifinals to end her hopes of achieving the Grand Slam, in what has been described by commentators as one of the greatest upsets in tennis history. She went on to lose to her childhood friend Flavia Pennetta in the first all-Italian major final. Vinci won 35 career titles, ten in singles and 25 in doubles, the latter including the 2012 French Open, the 2012 US Open, the 2013 and 2014 Australian Opens, and 2014 Wimbledon titles with regular partner Sara Errani. In doing so, they became the fifth pair in tennis history to complete a career Grand Slam.

Vinci and her Italian teammates Mara Santangelo, Pennetta, and Francesca Schiavone beat the Belgian team 3–2 in the 2006 Fed Cup final, granting Italy its first Fed Cup trophy. With the Italian team, Vinci won the Fed Cup again in 2009 and 2010, defeating the U.S. team in the final both times.

At the 2012 US Open, Vinci reached her first major singles quarterfinal, at 29 years of age, by defeating then-world No. 2 Agnieszka Radwańska. She lost to her doubles partner, world No. 10, Errani, in the quarterfinals. Vinci achieved the same feat the following year when she defeated Camila Giorgi in the fourth round, but subsequently lost to Flavia Pennetta. At one point, Vinci was one of only three players in the top 100 using a one-handed backhand.

In 2018, Vinci retired from professional tennis. In 2022, she began competing on the professional padel tour, reaching a ranking of world No. 66 in her debut season.

== Early life ==
Roberta Vinci was born in Taranto, the daughter of Angelo Vinci, an accountant, and his wife Luisa, a homemaker; she has an elder brother, Francesco. Vinci was introduced to tennis at the age of six. She now resides in Palermo.

== Career ==
=== Early career ===
Vinci made her professional debut at an ITF tournament in Italy in 1999. Vinci also won the French Open in girls' doubles with fellow Italian Flavia Pennetta that same year. She qualified for her first Grand Slam at the 2001 US Open, but lost to Martina Suchá in the first round.

One of the biggest victories of her career came in 2005 was when she beat former world No. 2 and 2004 French Open champion, Anastasia Myskina, in the quarterfinals at the Hastings Direct International Championships in Eastbourne. Alongside Sandrine Testud, Vinci reached the semifinals in women's doubles of the 2004 French Open. In 2007 at Bogotá, Vinci won her first WTA title against the top seed Tathiana Garbin, also of Italy, in three sets, after falling behind 0–3 in the final set. She won the title for Garbin had to retire.

=== 2009 ===
Vinci qualified for the Brisbane International and defeated Anna-Lena Grönefeld in the first round, before losing to top seed Ana Ivanovic in the second. She then fell to fellow Italian Corinna Dentoni in the qualifications for Hobart International. Vinci lost to eventual quarterfinalist Carla Suárez Navarro in the first round of the Australian Open. Vinci also played for Italy in the Fed Cup World Group stage versus France. Italy won 5–0.

At her first clay-court event, Mexican Open in Acapulco, Vinci defeated sixth seed Lucie Šafářová in the first round, and then fell to Ágnes Szávay of Hungary. Vinci then lost in the second rounds of both the Monterrey Open (defeated by Iveta Benešová) and the Indian Wells Open (defeated by Sybille Bammer), and fell in the qualifications for Miami Miami Open to Anastasia Rodionova. Vinci then fell to eventual champion and former world No. 1, Jelena Janković, in the quarterfinals of the Andalucía Tennis Experience in Marbella. At the Barcelona Open, Vinci earned her second career title, defeating Pauline Parmentier in the first round, Flavia Pennetta in the second, Anastasiya Yakimova in the quarterfinals, Francesca Schiavone in the semifinals, and defending champion Maria Kirilenko in the final.

Vinci reached the second round of the Morocco Open held in Fes. After she defeated Mariana Duque Marino in the first round, she lost to qualifier Polona Hercog in the second. At the Italian Open, Vinci lost in the first round to Kateryna Bondarenko. She then beat María José Martínez Sánchez in the first round of the Madrid Open, and then was beaten by Vera Dushevina in the second. She lost to ninth seed Victoria Azarenka in the first round at Roland Garros.

During the grass court season, Vinci reached the third round at Birmingham. She lost to Yanina Wickmayer in straight sets. The following week at s'Hertogenbosch, she lost her opening match to Daniela Hantuchová. At Wimbledon, Vinci beat No. 31, Anastasia Pavlyuchenkova, in the second round to set up a third-round matchup with No. 2, Serena Williams, and lost. At the US Open, Vinci lost in the first round to Jelena Janković.

=== 2010 ===
Vinci lost in the third round of the Australian Open to Maria Kirilenko. She reached the third round of both Indian Wells and Miami, losing to Yanina Wickmayer and Venus Williams respectively. She reached the final at Barcelona but failed to defend her title, losing to fellow Italian Francesca Schiavone.

At the Roland Garros, Vinci lost in the second round to Flavia Pennetta. She fell to Anastasia Pavlyuchenkova in the second round of Wimbledon.

She lost her opening match at the US Open to Venus Williams. She qualified for the Pan Pacific Open but lost to Vera Zvonareva in the third round. Vinci also qualified for the China Open but lost to Vera Dushevina in the second round. Vinci lost to eventual champion Ana Ivanovic in the Ladies Linz semifinals, 3–6, 5–7. She won her third WTA title in Luxembourg against Julia Görges, 6–3, 6–4 in the final.

=== 2011 ===
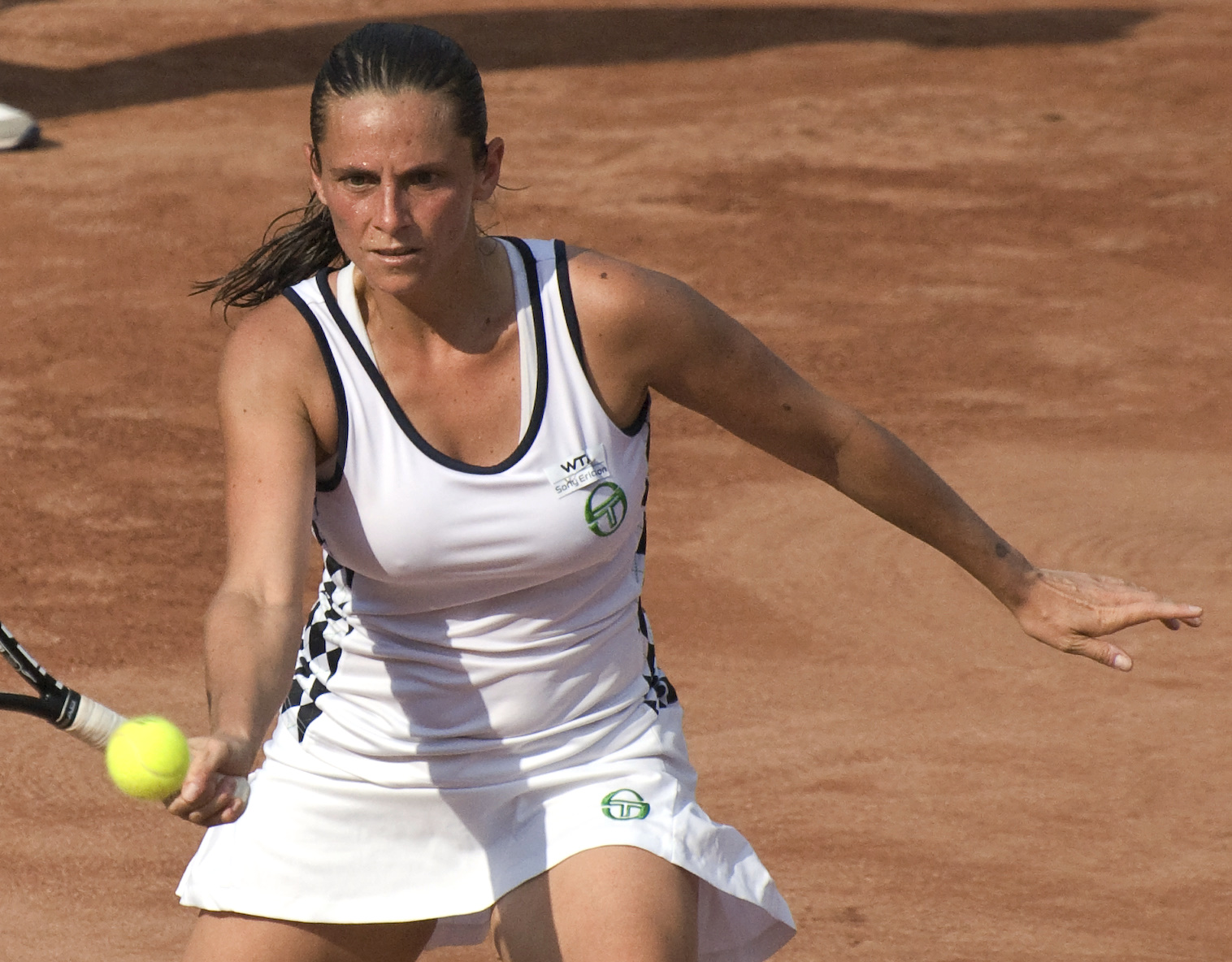
Roberta Vinci in Budapest

Vinci reached the quarterfinals of Hobart losing to sixth seed Jarmila Gajdošová. She lost in the first round of the Australian Open to Alicia Molik. She reached the semifinals of the Pattaya Open, after defeating second seed Ana Ivanovic in the quarterfinals but then lost to Sara Errani. The rest of her year continued with dismal results with only one win and six losses over the course of six events from Dubai to Stuttgart.

She then entered the Barcelona Open, where she was the sixth seed. She ended up winning the tournament without having to beat a seed, or a player inside the top 50. She beat Lucie Hradecká in the a three-set final. This was her second time winning this tournament and her third clay-court title. She then entered the Madrid tournament, where she reached the third round before losing to Li Na, the first time she had ever won a set against her. She lost in the third round of the French Open to Victoria Azarenka.

Her next major success came at the UNICEF Open where she was the seventh seed. After wins over third seed Yanina Wickmayer and fifth seed Dominika Cibulková in the quarterfinals and semifinals, respectively, she beat Jelena Dokić in the final. This was her second title of 2011 and her first title on grass. As the 29th seed at the Wimbledon Championships she reached the third round where she lost to eighth seed and eventual champion Petra Kvitová.

Her first post Wimbledon event was at Budapest where she was the top seed. She beat third seed Klára Zakopalová and then seventh seed Irina-Cameilia Begu in the final. This was her third tour title of the season.

Vinci began the American hardcourt swing in Carlsbad as the ninth seed. She was upset in the second round by Zheng Jie. In Toronto, she scored the biggest win of her career, beating defending champion and world No. 1, Caroline Wozniacki in straight sets, in the second round of the Canadian Open. In the second set, Vinci rallied from 1–5 down and saved multiple set points, before going on to win the match. In the third round, she defeated former world No. 1, Ana Ivanovic. She lost in the quarterfinals to tenth seed Sam Stosur in two sets.

As the 18th seed at the US Open, Vinci made it to the third round. In the first round, she defeated Irina-Camelia Begu. She then defeated Alizé Cornet in the second round but was sent home by Andrea Petkovic in the third round. Despite losing in the third round, this was Vinci's best performance so far in the US Open.

She qualified for the Tournament of Champions and was seeded fourth, but lost to eventual champion Ana Ivanovic in the quarterfinals.

=== 2012: World No. 1 in doubles, first Grand Slam singles quarterfinal ===
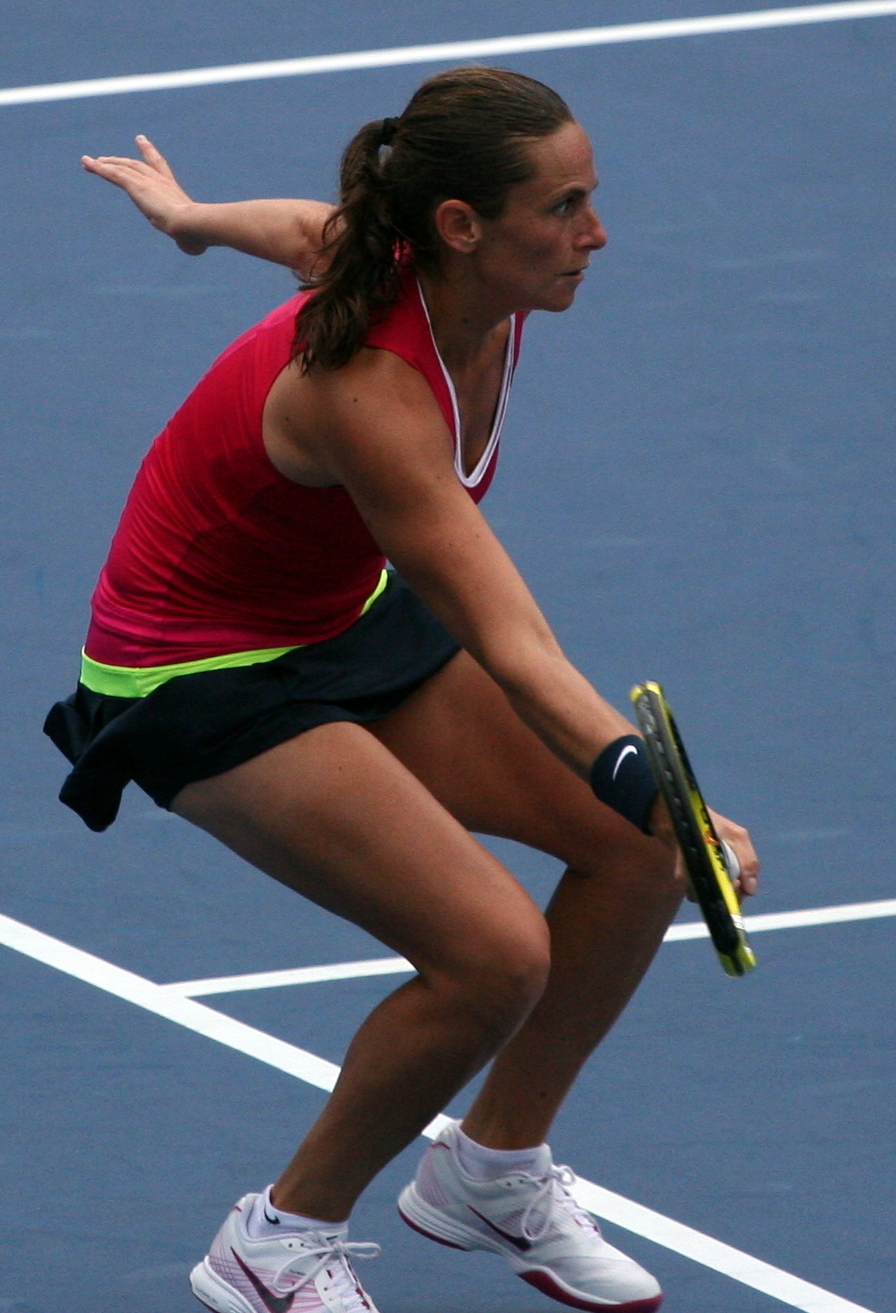
Vinci at the 2012 US Open

Starting the year at Auckland, she was seeded sixth and defeated Rebecca Marino in the first round before falling 3–6, 4–6 to unseeded Elena Vesnina in the second round. Roberta then suffered early round losses at the Apia International Sydney and the Australian Open to Daniela Hantuchová and Zheng Jie, respectively.

Her next tournament came at the Paris Indoors where she was seeded seventh. She defeated Simona Halep 6–4, 6–4, then Bethanie Mattek-Sands 6–3, 1–6, 6–3, before falling to eventual finalist Marion Bartoli in a third-set tiebreaker in the quarterfinals. Vinci then traveled to Mexico where she participated in her next two tournaments, the Monterrey Open and the Mexican Open. Seeded first in both events, she was upset by Nina Bratchikova in the second round of Monterrey, before bowing out to eventual champion Sara Errani in the semifinals at Acapulco.

Roberta then travelled to the Indian Wells Open. Seeded 23rd, she beat Sílvia Soler Espinosa and 20th-seeded Dominika Cibulková before falling to second-seeded Maria Sharapova, 3–6, 6–4, 3–6. She returned to the top 20 following her fourth round appearance. She then bowed out to tenth seeded Serena Williams in the third round of the Miami Open. She next participated at the Barcelona Open where she was the defending champ but lost in the second round to Simona Halep. Ironically, the tournament champion was Sara Errani, her doubles partner. Vinci and Errani managed to win the doubles title of the Barcelona Open by beating Francesca Schiavone and Flavia Pennetta in an all-Italian final, with the score of 6–2, 6–0.

She then entered the Estoril Open as the No. 1 seed. She made it to the semifinals before losing to eventual champion Kaia Kanepi. Her next tournament was Madrid, where she was unseeded and defeated the 14th seed Dominika Cibulková in the first round and lost in the round of 16 to Agniezska Radwańska. She then entered the French Open as the 17th seed and lost in the first round to Sofia Arvidsson.

Her first event after the French Open was the Birmingham Classic, where she was the No. 4 seed. She reached the quarterfinals before losing to Zheng Jie. She then was the No. 6 seed at the UNICEF Open, where she was the defending champion. She lost in the quarterfinals to Kirsten Flipkens 4–6, 6–7. She then competed in the Wimbledon Championships as the 21st seed. She defeated Ashleigh Barty, Marina Erakovic and Mirjana Lučić to reach the round of 16. This was the first time she had ever reached the second week of a major. She ended up losing her fourth round match to Tamira Paszek 2–6, 2–6.

Vinci also won six doubles titles with the fellow Italian Sara Errani including the Madrid Open, the Italian Open and the French Open in 2012. She and Errani also made the finals of Miami and Melbourne in that year.

Vinci lost her opening match at the London Olympics to Kim Clijsters, 1–6, 4–6.

At the Canadian Open in Montreal, Vinci defeated Yanina Wickmayer 6–2, 3–6, 7–5, after coming back from a 1–5 and match point deficit in the third set. In the second round she crushed 11th seed, Ana Ivanovic, 6–0, 6–0 in 45 minutes. After she defeated the 6th seed Angelique Kerber with the result of 6–2, 7–6, but she was beaten in the quarterfinals by the Czech Lucie Šafářová in straight sets. Two weeks later Vinci defeated Jelena Janković 7–5, 6–3 to win her seventh WTA title at the Texas Tennis Open without losing a set in the entire tournament.

At the US Open, Vinci started her journey by defeating Urszula Radwańska, 6–1, 6–1, and followed that victory up with a second round victory over Yaroslava Shvedova. In the third round, she defeated the 13th seed, Dominika Cibulková. In the fourth round, she defeated Agnieszka Radwańska in straight sets to advance to her first Grand Slam quarterfinal. She lost in the quarterfinals to her doubles partner Errani, 6–2, 6–4.

Vinci partnered Errani for the US Open. They were seeded No. 2, behind the defending champions Liezel Huber and Lisa Raymond. Errani and Vinci reached the final, defeating Czechs Andrea Hlaváčková and Lucie Hradecká for the title.

Following the US Open, Vinci travelled to Asia for the Pan Pacific Open. She made it to the third round where she lost to top seed Victoria Azarenka. At Beijing, she lost her opener to qualifier Lourdes Domínguez Lino. As a result of her doubles success alongside Sara Errani, they qualified for the WTA Championships for the first time. However, they lost to Russians Nadia Petrova and Maria Kirilenko in the semifinals. Vinci once again qualified for the Tournament of Champions. In the round robin stage, she recorded wins over Hsieh Su-wei and Daniela Hantuchová and had a loss to Caroline Wozniacki. She advanced to the semifinals where she lost to second seed and eventual champion Petrova. Vinci ended 2012 in top 20 for the first time at No. 16 and No. 1 in for the first time also doubles ahead of her partner Errani.

=== 2013 ===
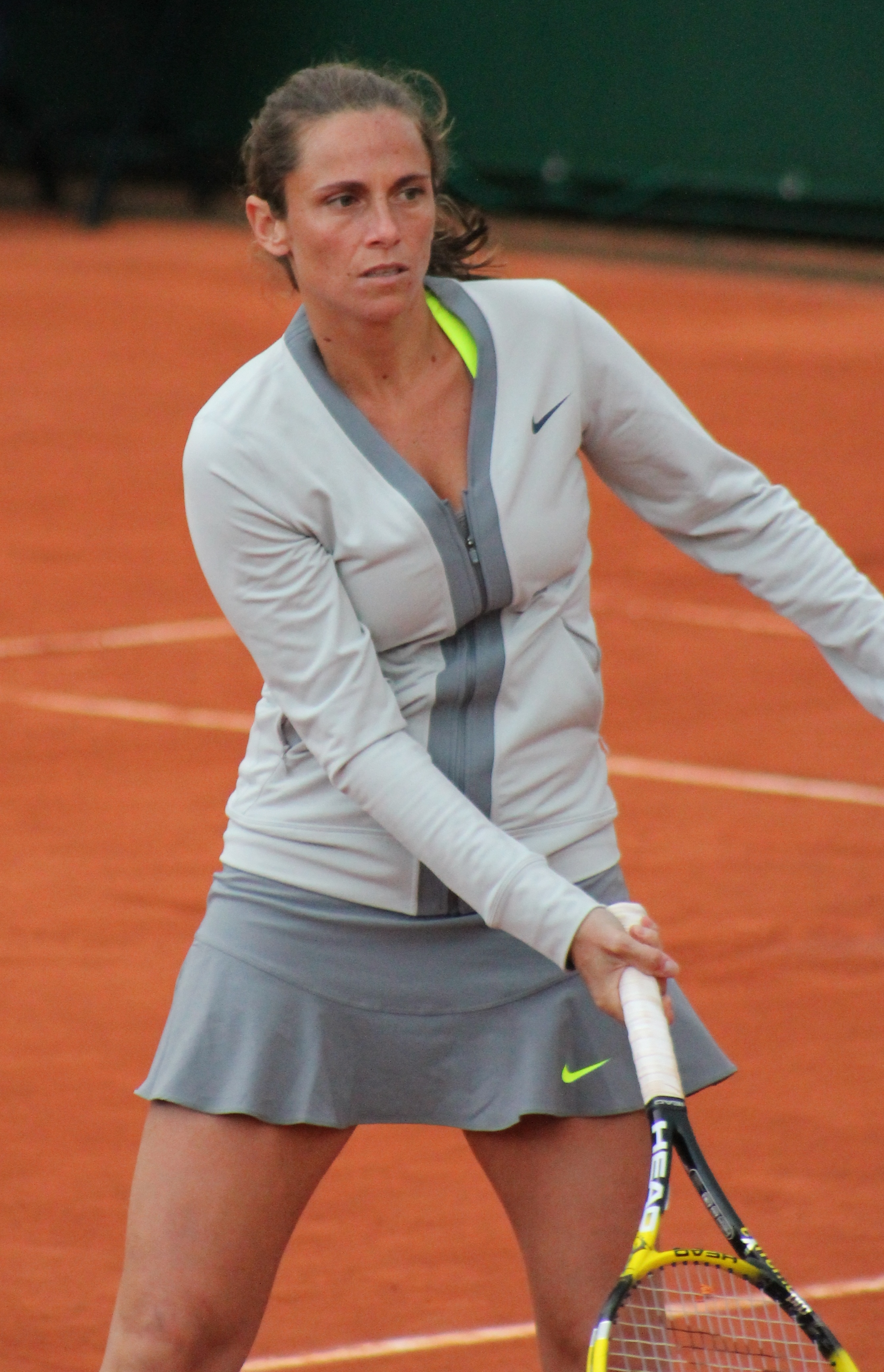
Vinci at the 2013 French Open

Vinci began 2013 by losing her opening match to Jarmila Gajdošová at Brisbane. She reached the quarterfinals at Sydney where she lost to eventual champion Agnieszka Radwańska. At the Australian Open where she was seeded 16th, she lost to Elena Vesnina in the third round. She partnered Sara Errani and won the doubles event.

She was seeded fifth at the Open GdF Suez but lost to German Mona Barthel in the second round. Vinci lost to Urszula Radwańska in the second round at Qatar Open. Then, at Dubai she defeated Svetlana Kuznetsova, Samantha Stosur and Angelique Kerber en route to the semifinals. She eventually succumbed to doubles partner Errani in straight sets.

Vinci lost in the third round at Indian Wells to Lara Arruabarrena. She improved her performance at Miami, reaching the quarterfinals. There, she lost to 22nd seed Jelena Janković. Vinci won her eighth WTA title when defeated top-seeded Petra Kvitová, 7–6, 6–1, to win the Katowice Open in Poland.

Roberta began her clay court season by losing her opening matches at Stuttgart and Madrid. She reached the third round at Rome, but lost to Simona Halep. Vinci lost to Serena Williams in the fourth round at the French Open.

She was the top seed at Rosmalen but lost to Halep again in the second round. She reached the fourth round at Wimbledon but lost to Li Na. After that, Vinci competed at Internazionali di Palermo and won her 9th title by defeating doubles partner Sara Errani in the final. Vinci lost to Ana Ivanovic in the quarterfinals at the Southern California Open at Carlsbad.

At the Canadian Open, she lost to Dominika Cibulková in the third round. Then, Vinci lost to Jelena Janković in the quarterfinals of the Cincinnati Open. Had she won this match, she would've entered the top 10 singles rankings for the first time in her career. At the US Open, Vinci reached her second Grand Slam quarterfinal, this time she lost to Flavia Pennetta.

During the Asian swing, she lost to Lucie Šafářová in the second round at the Pan Pacific Open after receiving a first round bye. At Beijing, she lost in the third round to Angelique Kerber. Her next tournament was at the Kremlin Cup. She lost to Svetlana Kuznetsova in the quarterfinals. Vinci and Errani once again qualified for the Tour Championships but lost in the semifinals again to a Russian pair, Ekaterina Makarova and Elena Vesnina. Vinci ended the year at No. 14 in singles, her highest ever and No. 1 in doubles for the third straight season.

=== 2014: Career Grand Slam in doubles ===
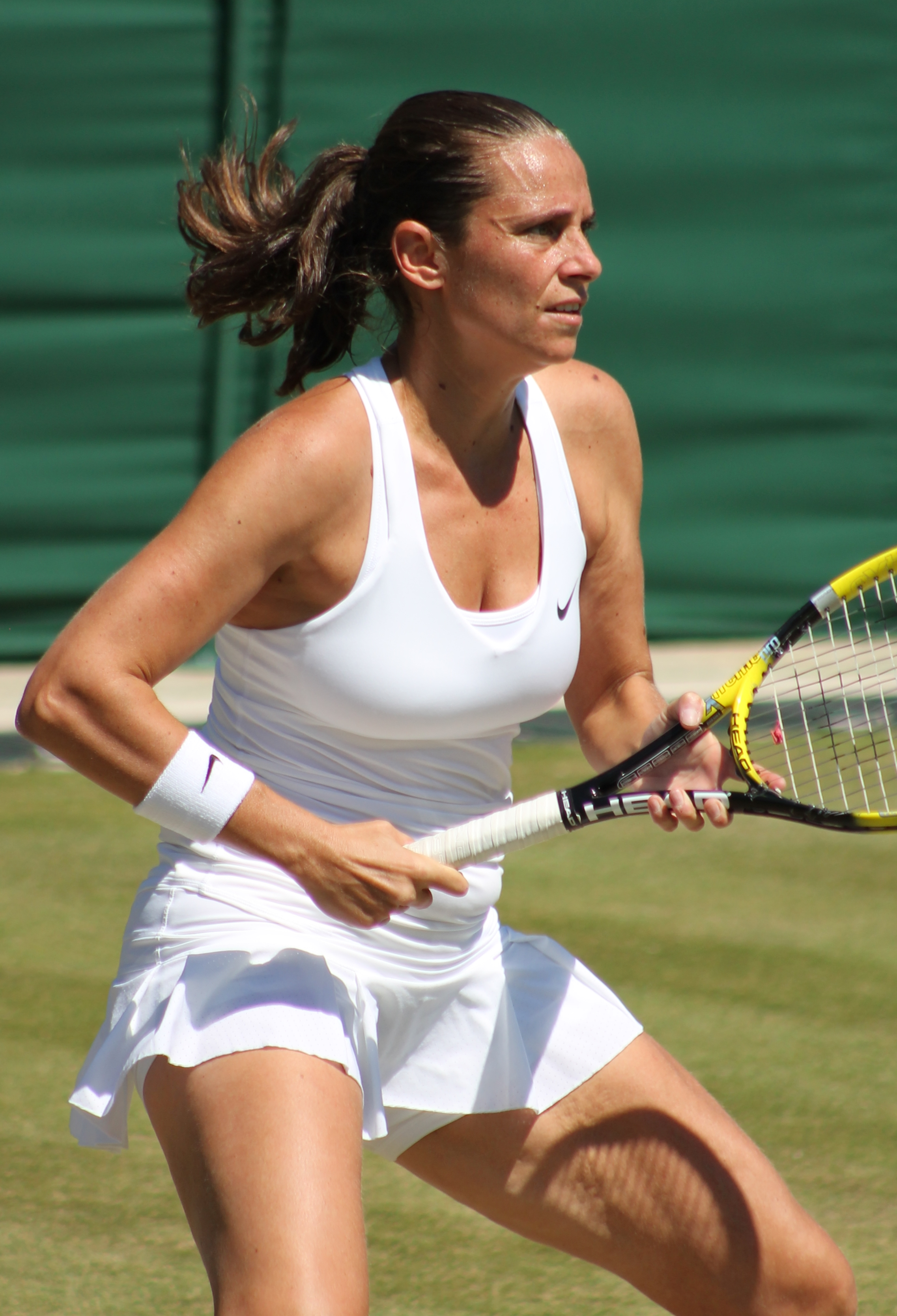
Vinci at the 2014 Wimbledon Championships

Vinci began the season at the Auckland Open as the top seed. She fell in the first round to rising star Ana Konjuh in three sets. Then at the Sydney International, she lost to doubles partner Sara Errani in the first round. At the Australian Open, Vinci was the 12th seed but fell in the first round to Zheng Jie. In the doubles event, she partnered Errani and won the title, defeating Russian pair Makarova and Vesnina.

Then, she competed at the Open GdF Suez but lost in the first round again to Elina Svitolina. Her bad form continued with first round losses at Doha and Dubai to Tsvetana Pironkova and Sorana Cîrstea, respectively. Vinci received a first bye at Indian Wells and defeated Madison Keys in her opening match for her first victory of 2014. However, she lost to Casey Dellacqua in the following round. She once again lost her opening match at Miami to Barbora Záhlavová-Strýcová, in straight sets, after having a first-round bye.

Vinci failed to defend her title at the Katowice Open. She beat qualifier Ksenia Pervak in round one but lost to Camila Giorgi the following round. Vinci faced Petra Kvitová during Italy's semifinal Fed Cup tie against Czech team but lost in straight sets.

She began her clay court season at Stuttgart. She beat Annika Beck in the first round, but lost to Agnieszka Radwańska in straight sets. In the doubles event, Vinci and Errani were the champions, overcoming Cara Black and Sania Mirza in the final. Vinci reached her first quarterfinal of the year at the Portugal Open. She defeated Alexandra Cadanțu and Yanina Wickmayer en route. She then lost to Elena Vesnina. At the Madrid Open, she won her opening match against Daniela Hantuchová and went on to defeat Caroline Wozniacki in the second round. She lost to Radwańska again in the third round. Playing on home soil at the Italian Open, Vinci lost in the first round to Ekaterina Makarova. She was seeded 20th at the French Open but lost to Pauline Parmentier in the first round. Vinci and Errani lost in the doubles final to world number ones Peng Shuai and Hsieh Su-wei.

She then competed at Eastbourne, but lost to Daniela Hantuchová this time in the first round. Her disastrous run continued at Wimbledon when she lost to Donna Vekić in the first round. However, she made history in the doubles event when she and Errani won defeating Hungarian/French pair Tímea Babos and Kristina Mladenovic in the final, completing a career Grand Slam in doubles.

Vinci posted good results the following month. She was the second seed at the Bucharest Open. She defeated Alexandra Dulgheru and Sílvia Soler Espinosa for a place in the quarterfinals. She then reached her first semifinal of 2014 with a victory over seventh seed Petra Cetkovská. She then easily defeated Kristína Kučová and reached the final where she was defeated in straight sets by top seed and home favourite Simona Halep. Vinci is next competed at Istanbul where she was the second seed, she defeated Anna Tatishvili in the first round. In the second round, she faced Dulgheru again and advanced to the quarterfinals when Dulgheru retired because of a shoulder injury. Vinci faced Kurumi Nara in the quarterfinals and won in straight sets. In the semifinals, she faced rising star Ana Konjuh, setting up a rematch of their opener in Auckland, Vinci won this time, defeating her in straight sets. In her second consecutive final, Vinci lost to the top seed again, Caroline Wozniacki.

In August, Vinci lost in the first round at Montreal and Cincinnati to Barbora Záhlavová-Strýcová and Sabine Lisicki respectively. Vinci and Errani won their fifth doubles title of the year together in the doubles event at Montreal. They defeated Cara Black and Sania Mirza in the final. At the US Open, Vinci won her first Grand Slam singles match of 2014 by defeating Paula Ormaechea in the first round followed by a three-set win over Irina-Camelia Begu. She then lost to eventual semifinalist Peng Shuai in the third round. Vinci fell out of the top 40 as a result.

During the Asian swing, Vinci suffered another upset at the Guangzhou International Open where she was seeded sixth. She lost to Zhu Lin in the first round. Then at Wuhan, she fell to Casey Dellacqua in the first round. Vinci found her good form at the China Open, defeating Yaroslava Shvedova and upsetting world No. 6, Agnieszka Radwańska, in the early rounds. Her run continued with another upset of Ekaterina Makarova in the third round. She booked her place in the quarterfinals where she faced Petra Kvitová. She lost to the Czech in straight sets. At the Luxembourg Open, Vinci the sixth seed easily defeated Tereza Smitková in the first round but then lost to Beck in straight sets. Vinci and Errani once again qualified for the WTA Finals as the top seeds. They were forced to retire in their first hurdle to Květa Peschke and Katarina Srebotnik due to an injury suffered by Errani. Vinci ended the season outside the top 40 for the first time since 2010 at No. 49.

=== 2015: Grand Slam finalist ===
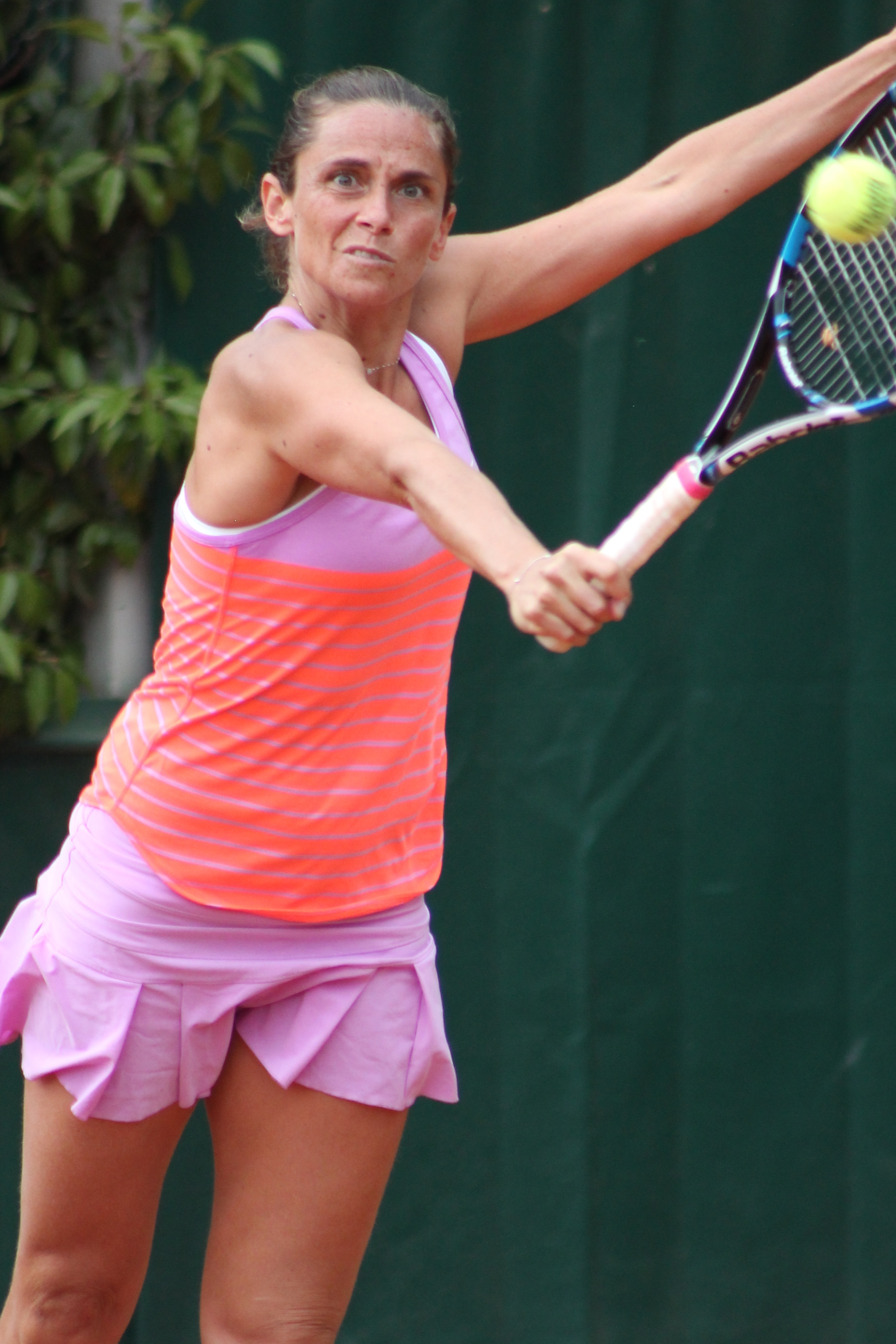
Vinci at the 2015 French Open

Vinci kicked off her 2015 season by playing at the Auckland Open. She lost in the first round to seventh seed CoCo Vandeweghe. The following week, she played at the Hobart International. Seeded ninth, Vinci made it to her first quarterfinals of the year defeating wildcard Olivia Rogowska and Annika Beck. In the quarterfinals, she fell to eventual champion Heather Watson in two sets. At the Australian Open, Vinci overcame Bojana Jovanovski to reach round two but lost to tenth seed Ekaterina Makarova.

Seeded third at the Rio Open, Vinci was upset in the second round by qualifier Verónica Cepede Royg. She then retired in her first-round match against Kiki Bertens at the Mexican Open with a shoulder injury. Vinci exited the second round at the Indian Wells Open to 24th seed Sabine Lisicki. The following week at the Miami Open, she dropped her opening match against qualifier Tatjana Maria. During the week, it was also announced that Vinci and her long-term doubles partner Sara Errani decided to discontinue playing doubles together. They issued a joint statement stating that they had decided to pursue more in their singles career.

Beginning her clay-court season seeded sixth at the Morocco Open, Vinci lost to fellow Italian Karin Knapp in the second round. She then posted good results at the Madrid Open. She reached the fourth round for the second year in a row beating Monica Puig and Alizé Cornet. She ended up losing in the fourth round to 13th seed Lucie Šafářová. Ranked 44 at the Italian Open, Vinci was defeated in the first round by world No. 41, Heather Watson. Seeded fourth at the Nürnberger Versicherungscup, she reached her first final of the season but came up short in the final losing to sixth seed and compatriot Karin Knapp, in three sets. Ranked 38 at the French Open, Vinci lost in the first round to 29th seed Alizé Cornet.

Vinci began her grass-court season at the Birmingham Classic. She was defeated in the first round by qualifier Tímea Babos. At the Eastbourne International, she lost in the first round to Caroline Garcia. Ranked 35 at Wimbledon, Vinci lost in the first round to Aleksandra Krunić.

After Wimbledon, Vinci competed at the Bucharest Open where she was the second seed and last year's finalist. She lost in the second round to Aleksandra Krunić in straight sets. Last year finalist at the İstanbul Cup, Vinci reached the quarterfinals beating seventh seed Anastasia Pavlyuchenkova and qualifier Alexandra Panova. Vinci then lost in the quarterfinals to Magdaléna Rybáriková.

Vinci then reached her second quarterfinal at the Canadian Open by defeating Karin Knapp, qualifier Mirjana Lučić-Baroni, and Daria Gavrilova all in straight sets. She then succumbed to world No. 1, Serena Williams, in the quarterfinals. She then lost to Anastasia Pavlyuchenkova in the first round at the Cincinnati Open. Vinci qualified for the main draw at the Connecticut Open and easily defeated Eugenie Bouchard in the first round. She then was defeated in the second round in three sets by third seed Caroline Wozniacki.

Ranked 43 at the US Open, Vinci won her first three rounds defeating Vania King, Denisa Allertová, and Mariana Duque Mariño. Vinci then reached her third US Open quarterfinal in four years after Eugenie Bouchard withdrew a few hours before their fourth-round match after she slipped and hit her head in the locker room. In the quarterfinals, Vinci defeated Kristina Mladenovic to reach the semifinals. At 32, Vinci became the oldest first-time Grand Slam semifinalist in the Open Era. She then dispatched defending champion Serena Williams in three sets en route to her first Grand Slam final, while also ending Williams' attempt at a calendar-year Grand Slam. Vinci was ranked 42 places lower than Williams at that time. Numerous major media outlets reported about Vinci's win over Williams being one of the biggest upsets in tennis history. She lost to Flavia Pennetta in the final in straight sets in what was the first all-Italian Grand Slam final in the Open Era. By virtue of her run to the final in New York, Vinci returned to the top 20 for the first time since June 2014.

Seeded 15th at the Wuhan Open, Vinci defeated qualifier Danka Kovinić and Irina-Camelia Begu in the first two rounds. In the third round, she stunned third seed and defending champion, Petra Kvitová. She then defeated eighth seed Karolína Plíšková in two sets to advance to the semifinals. In the semifinals, Vinci lost to eventual champion Venus Williams in three sets. In this match, Vinci had a 6–5 lead in the third set and even had one match point before Venus came back and won the match. Seeded 15th at the China Open, Vinci lost in the third round to qualifier Bethanie Mattek-Sands. Seeded third at the Linz Open, she was defeated in the first round by qualifier Aleksandra Krunić. Vinci's final tournament of the year was the first edition of the WTA Elite Trophy. Seeded fourth, Vinci beat 11th seed Svetlana Kuznetsova in her first rubber in two sets. In her second rubber, she lost to Alternate Anna Karolína Schmiedlová. Having a 1–1 record in Group D, Vinci reached the semifinals losing to top-seed and eventual champion Venus Williams.

Vinci ended the year ranked 15.

=== 2016: First title since 2013, top-10 debut ===
Vinci started her season at the Brisbane International. Seeded eighth, she started the tournament by defeating Jelena Janković in the first round, 3–6, 6–2, 6–4. She then dominated Dominika Cibulková in their second round match 6–1, 6–1. In the quarterfinals, she lost to former world No. 1, two-time Australian Open champion, and eventual champion, Victoria Azarenka, 1–6, 2–6. After Brisbane, she competed at Sydney where she lost in the first round to Samantha Stosur. As the 13th seed at the Australian Open, Vinci reached the third round after beating qualifier Tamira Paszek and world No. 74, Irina Falconi. In the third round, she suffered a shock loss to world No. 82, Anna-Lena Friedsam, 6–0, 4–6, 4–6.

After the Australian Open, Vinci played at the inaugural St. Petersburg Trophy. Seeded second, she reached the final defeating Yanina Wickmayer, Tímea Babos, and fourth seed Ana Ivanovic. In the final, Vinci beat top seed Belinda Bencic, 6–4, 6–3. This was Vinci's tenth career WTA singles title, her first since 2013, and her first Premier-level title. Seeded seventh at the Dubai Tennis Championships, Vinci lost in the first round to qualifier Yaroslava Shvedova, 0–6, 6–4, 3–6. Despite losing in the first round to Shvedova, Vinci rose to a career-high ranking of 10 as neither Lucie Šafářová nor Venus Williams defended their ranking points from the previous year, she became the oldest female tennis player to make her top-10 singles debut, four days after her 33rd birthday. Seeded 9th at the Qatar Total Open, Vinci defeated Lesia Tsurenko, Daria Kasatkina, and wildcard Çağla Büyükakçay to reach the quarterfinals. There, she lost to 3rd seed Agnieszka Radwańska, 6–3, 2–6, 3–6. As the top seed at the Malaysian Open, Vinci suffered a shock loss in the first round to world No. 153, Chang Kai-chen, 7–5, 2–6, 1–6. As the ninth seed at the Indian Wells Open, Vinci received a bye into the second round and faced Margarita Gasparyan. Vinci came through in a three-set thriller, 6–3, 6–7, 7–6. Vinci had to save two match points in order to defeat Gasparyan in the second round. She then won comfortably against 17th seed Elina Svitolina in the third round 6–1, 6–3. In the fourth round, she was forced to retire trailing 2–6, 0–2 to Magdaléna Rybáriková. Seeded ninth at the Miami Open, Vinci received a bye into the second round where she beat Lucie Hradecká, 1–6, 6–4, 7–6. In the third round, Vinci was defeated by 22nd seed Madison Keys, 6–4, 6–4. At the 2016 Fed Cup World Group play-offs, Vinci represented Italy in their tie against Spain. Vinci lost both of her rubbers to Carla Suárez Navarro and Garbiñe Muguruza. Spain defeated Italy 4–0.

Vinci began her clay court season at the Porsche Tennis Grand Prix. Seeded sixth, Vinci reached the quarterfinals beating Ekaterina Makarova and German wildcard Julia Görges. In the quarterfinals, she lost to German qualifier and eventual finalist Laura Siegemund 1–6, 4–6. Seeded 7th at the Madrid Open, Vinci lost in the first round to world No. 52, Danka Kovinić, 4–6, 2–6. Seeded seventh and given a first-round bye at the Internazionali BNL d'Italia, Vinci was defeated in the second round by world No. 23, Johanna Konta, 6–0, 6–4. Vinci's final tournament before the French Open was the Nürnberger Versicherungscup. As the top seed, she lost in the second round to qualifier and eventual champion, Kiki Bertens, 4–6, 6–7. Seeded seventh at the French Open, Vinci was upset in the first round by world No. 65, Kateryna Bondarenko, 6–1, 6–3.

Vinci played only one grass-court warm-up tournament before Wimbledon. Seeded second at Eastbourne, she lost in the second round to Ekaterina Makarova 6–4, 4–6, 3–6. Seeded sixth at Wimbledon, Vinci reached the third round defeating Alison Riske and lucky loser Duan Yingying. She lost then to 27th seed CoCo Vandeweghe in straight sets.

Vinci started her US Open Series at the Canadian Open. Seeded seventh, she lost in the third round to world No. 33, Daria Kasatkina, 5–7, 3–6. Representing Italy at the Rio Olympics, Vinci was defeated in the first round by Anna Karolína Schmiedlová, 7–5, 6–4. Seeded sixth at the Western & Southern Open, Vinci was defeated in the third round by ninth seed Carla Suárez Navarro, 6–1, 7–5. Seeded second at the Connecticut Open, Vinci lost in the quarterfinals to qualifier Johanna Larsson 6–7, 1–6. Vinci was seeded seventh at the US Open, where she has finalist points to defend from last year. She reached the quarterfinals for the fourth time in five years, defeating Anna-Lena Friedsam, Christina McHale, Carina Witthöft, and Lesia Tsurenko. Vinci then lost in the quarterfinals to second seed and eventual champion Angelique Kerber, 5–7, 0–6. As a result, Vinci failed to defend her finalist points from last year, so she fell from the top 10.

Seeded 13th at the Wuhan Open, Vinci was defeated in the second round by Yaroslava Shvedova, 7–5, 6–2. Seeded 13th at the China Open, she lost in the second round to Caroline Wozniacki, 3–6, 2–6. Vinci's final tournament of the year was the WTA Elite Trophy in Zhuhai. Seeded fifth, Vinci lost her first match to 9th seed Barbora Strýcová, 4–6, 3–6. In her final match, Vinci was defeated by third seed and eventual champion Petra Kvitová, 6–1, 6–2. In November, Vinci was contemplating retirement from Tennis due to her poor results and tiredness. However, on 21 November 2016, Vinci decided to play at least one more year.

Vinci ended the year ranked 18.

=== 2017 ===
Vinci began the season at the Brisbane International. Seeded eighth, she started the tournament off by beating lucky loser Kateryna Bondarenko in the first round, 7–6, 6–7, 7–6. She then defeated Misaki Doi in the second round 6–4, 6–2. In the quarterfinals, Vinci lost to third seed and eventual champion Karolína Plíšková, 6–3, 2–6, 2–6. Next, Vinci played at the Sydney International. Seeded ninth, she was defeated in the second round by Barbora Strýcová, 6–2, 6–3. As the 15th seed at the Australian Open, Vinci lost in the first round to world No. 35 and eventual semifinalist, CoCo Vandeweghe, 1–6, 6–7.

After the Australian Open, Vinci went to compete at the St. Petersburg Trophy, where she was the sixth seed and the defending champion. She started off the tournament by beating Tímea Babos in the first round, 6–3, 3–6, 6–4 before she defeated qualifier Andrea Petkovic, 6–4, 6–4. In the quarterfinals, Vinci was defeated by eventual champion Kristina Mladenovic, 6–1, 6–4. Due to losing in the quarterfinals, Vinci failed to defend her title. At the Qatar Open, Vinci lost in the first round to qualifier Lauren Davis, 2–6, 3–6. Seeded 16th at the Dubai Tennis Championships, Vinci was upset in the first round by world No. 55, Kristýna Plíšková, 3–6, 7–5, 6–3. Vinci had a 6–3, 5–4 lead and was serving for the match before Plíšková made a comeback to win the match. Seeded 26th at Indian Wells, Vinci received a first round bye. She lost in the third round to eighth seed Svetlana Kuznetsova, 2–6, 6–2, 1–6. Seeded 25th at the Miami Open, Vinci was stunned in the second round by qualifier Taylor Townsend, 6–3, 6–2. After Miami, Vinci played at the first edition of the Ladies Open Biel Bienne. As the fourth seed, she was upset in the first round by world No. 58, Kristýna Plíšková, 6–4, 6–4.

Vinci began her clay-court season at the Porsche Grand Prix. In the first round, Vinci lost to newly returned Maria Sharapova, 5–7, 3–6. Vinci had her first win since Indian Wells at the Madrid Open by defeating Daria Kasatkina in the first round, 6–1, 1–6, 6–1. In the second round, she lost to 3rd seed and eventual champion Simona Halep, 3–6, 6–2, 6–7. Vinci led 3–6, 6–2, 5–2 before Halep came back to win the match. At the Internazionali BNL d'Italia, she lost in the first round to Ekaterina Makarova, 2–6, 1–6. As the 31st seed at the French Open, Vinci was defeated in the first round by the previous year's Olympic gold medalist Monica Puig, 6–3, 3–6, 6–2.

Vinci played one grass-court warm-up tournament to prepare herself for Wimbledon. As the sixth seed at the Mallorca Open, she beat lucky loser and compatriot Sara Errani in the first round 6–2, 6–1. In the second round, she defeated qualifier Kirsten Flipkens, 6–4, 5–7, 6–2, to reach the quarterfinals for the first time at this tournament. In the quarterfinals, Vinci was defeated by third seed and defending champion, Caroline Garcia, 6–2, 7–6. Seeded 31st at Wimbledon, Vinci lost in the first round to Kristýna Plíšková, 6–7, 2–6.

=== 2018: Retirement ===
Having announced her plans to retire after the Italian Open, Vinci continued to play sporadically through the early part of the season. She faced Aleksandra Krunić in the opening round of the Italian Open, but lost the final match of her career in a keenly contested three set match. She said of her retirement: "I'm crying now but I'm happy, I'm happy for what I've accomplished".

=== 2022: Padel career ===
In 2022, partnering with Giulia Sussarello, Vinci joined the professional padel circuit. She finished the season with a 28–12 record and reached a ranking of world no. 66 on the World Padel Tour. Vinci also represented Italy at the International Padel Federation's Padel World Championship, combining with fellow tennis retiree Emily Stellato to defeat Belgium in the penultimate bronze medal match.

== Playing style ==
Vinci is known for her doubles prowess, her ability at the net, and relentless use of the backhand slice, although she regrets switching her backhand grip to one-handed at the age of 18. Vinci has also been praised for her excellent movement and her sense of the court. Due to her backhand slice, powerful forehand and excellent court covering, her game is often compared to Steffi Graf.

== Grand Slam finals ==
=== Singles: 1 (runner-up) ===
Result	Year	Championship	Surface	Opponent	Score
Loss	2015	US Open	Hard	(Italy) Flavia Pennetta	6–7^{(4–7)}, 2–6

=== Doubles: 8 (5 titles, 3 runner-ups) ===
Result	Year	Championship	Surface	Partner	Opponents	Score
Loss	2012	Australian Open	Hard	(Italy) Sara Errani	(Russia) Svetlana Kuznetsova (Russia) Vera Zvonareva	5–7, 6–4, 6–3
Win	2012	French Open	Clay	(Italy) Sara Errani	(Russia) Maria Kirilenko (Russia) Nadia Petrova	4–6, 6–4, 6–2
Win	2012	US Open	Hard	(Italy) Sara Errani	(Czech Republic) Andrea Hlaváčková (Czech Republic) Lucie Hradecká	6–4, 6–2
Win	2013	Australian Open	Hard	(Italy) Sara Errani	(Australia) Ashleigh Barty (Australia) Casey Dellacqua	6–2, 3–6, 6–2
Loss	2013	French Open	Clay	(Italy) Sara Errani	(Russia) Ekaterina Makarova (Russia) Elena Vesnina	5–7, 2–6
Win	2014	Australian Open (2)	Hard	(Italy) Sara Errani	(Russia) Ekaterina Makarova (Russia) Elena Vesnina	6–4, 3–6, 7–5
Loss	2014	French Open	Clay	(Italy) Sara Errani	(Chinese Taipei) Hsieh Su-wei (China) Peng Shuai	4–6, 1–6
Win	2014	Wimbledon	Grass	(Italy) Sara Errani	(Hungary) Tímea Babos (France) Kristina Mladenovic	6–1, 6–3

== Grand Slam performance timelines ==
Key
W	F	SF	QF	#R	RR	Q#	DNQ	A	NH

(W) winner; (F) finalist; (SF) semifinalist; (QF) quarterfinalist; (#R) rounds 4, 3, 2, 1; (RR) round-robin stage; (Q#) qualification round; (DNQ) did not qualify; (A) absent; (NH) not held; (SR) strike rate (events won / competed); (W–L) win–loss record.

=== Singles ===
Tournament	2001	2002	2003	2004	2005	2006	2007	2008	2009	2010	2011	2012	2013	2014	2015	2016	2017	2018	W–L
Australian Open	A	Q1	Q2	Q3	Q1	3R	1R	1R	1R	3R	1R	2R	3R	1R	2R	3R	1R	Q1	10–12
French Open	A	Q2	Q2	1R	1R	1R	1R	Q1	1R	2R	3R	1R	4R	1R	1R	1R	1R	A	6–13
Wimbledon	A	1R	Q3	Q3	3R	A	2R	Q2	3R	2R	3R	4R	4R	1R	1R	3R	1R	A	16–12
US Open	1R	Q1	A	1R	1R	1R	1R	2R	1R	1R	3R	QF	QF	3R	F	QF	1R	A	23–15
Win–loss	0–1	0–1	0–0	0–2	2–3	2–3	1–4	1–2	2–4	4–4	6–4	8–4	12–4	2–4	6–4	8–4	0–4	0–0	55–52

Note: Vinci received a walkover in the 2015 US Open, after Eugenie Bouchard sustained concussion. This did not count a win.

=== Doubles ===
Tournament	2001	2002	2003	2004	2005	2006	2007	2008	2009	2010	2011	2012	2013	2014	2015	2016	2017	W–L
Australian Open	A	3R	1R	QF	1R	1R	2R	2R	2R	2R	1R	F	W	W	3R	3R	A	30–13
French Open	QF	QF	1R	SF	1R	3R	1R	1R	1R	2R	3R	W	F	F	3R	A	A	33–14
Wimbledon	A	3R	1R	3R	1R	A	1R	A	1R	3R	3R	QF	3R	W	3R	1R	A	21–12
US Open	SF	1R	A	1R	3R	2R	1R	A	1R	1R	QF	W	QF	2R	3R	A	A	22–12
Win–loss	7–2	7–4	0–3	9–4	2–4	3–3	1–4	1–2	1–4	4–4	7–4	20–2	16–3	18–2	8–4	2–2	0–0	106–51

== Team competition ==
- 2006, 2009, 2010 and 2013 Fed Cup

== See also ==
- Italy Fed Cup team
- Italy at the 2004 Summer Olympics
- Italy at the 2008 Summer Olympics
- Italy at the 2012 Summer Olympics

Awards
Preceded by Katarina Srebotnik & Květa Peschke	WTA Doubles Team of the Year (with Sara Errani); 2012 – 2014	Succeeded by Martina Hingis & Sania Mirza
Preceded by Katarina Srebotnik & Květa Peschke	ITF Women's doubles World Champions (with Sara Errani); 2012–2014	Succeeded by Martina Hingis & Sania Mirza
Preceded by Ekaterina Makarova & Elena Vesnina	WTA Fan Favorite Doubles Team of the Year (with Sara Errani); 2014	Succeeded by Incumbent
