= Samantha Stosur career statistics =

Career finals
Discipline	Type	Won	Lost	Total	WR (Note: Winning rate)
Singles	Grand Slam	1	1	2	0.50
Singles	Summer Olympics	–	–	–	–
Singles	WTA Finals (Note: Formerly known as: Virginia Slims Championships (until 1995); WTA Tour Championships (until 2014))	–	–	–	–
Singles	WTA Elite (Note: Elite tier: WTA Tournament of Champions (2009–14); WTA Elite Trophy (2015–present))	0	1	1	0.00
Singles	WTA 1000 (Note: Formerly known as: Category 4 & 5 & 6 (until 1990); Tier I (until 2009); WTA Premier Mandatory and 5 (until 2021))	0	3	3	0.00
Singles	WTA 500 (Note: Formerly known as: Category 3 (until 1990); Tier II (until 2009); WTA Premier (until 2021))	2	5	7	0.29
Singles	WTA 250 (Note: Formerly known as: Category 1 & 2 (until 1990); Tier III & IV & V (until 2009); WTA International (until 2021))	6	6	12	0.50
Singles	Total	9	16	25	0.36
Doubles	Grand Slam	4	5	9	0.44
Doubles	Summer Olympics	–	–	–	–
Doubles	WTA Finals	2	0	2	1.00
Doubles	WTA Elite	–	–	–	–
Doubles	WTA 1000	10	5	15	0.67
Doubles	WTA 500	9	3	12	0.75
Doubles	WTA 250	3	2	5	0.60
Doubles	Total	28	15	43	0.65
Mixed Doubles	Grand Slam	3	1	4	0.75
Mixed Doubles	Total	3	2	5	0.60
Total		40	33	73	0.55

This is a list of the main career statistics of professional Australian tennis player Samantha Stosur. She won nine WTA singles titles, including one Grand Slam title at the 2011 US Open, while reaching the finals of 16 other WTA tournaments, including one Grand Slam final at the 2010 French Open, the 2013 WTA Tournament of Champions final, and three Premier 5 finals. Stosur also reached another three French Open semifinals (2009, 2012, 2016), two US Open quarterfinals (2010, 2012), and qualified for the WTA Tour Championships three times in a row (2010–12), reaching the semifinals in both 2010 and 2011. She reached her highest singles ranking of No. 4 in the world in February 2011.

Stosur also enjoyed a successful doubles career, in which she held the world No. 1 ranking for 61 consecutive weeks between February 2006 and April 2007, finished as the year-end world No. 1 doubles team with former partner Lisa Raymond in 2005 and 2006, and was the year-end world No. 1 doubles player in 2006. Stosur won 28 WTA doubles titles, including four Grand Slam women's doubles titles at the 2005 US Open, 2006 French Open, 2019 Australian Open, and 2021 US Open, as well as two consecutive WTA Tour Championship titles in 2005 and 2006. She reached an additional five Grand Slam finals in doubles at the 2006 Australian Open, the 2008, 2009 and 2012 Wimbledon Championships, and the 2008 US Open.

Stosur achieved notable success in mixed doubles too, winning three Grand Slam titles at the 2005 Australian Open and the 2008 and 2014 Wimbledon Championships. She would close out her playing career by reaching two more Grand Slam finals at the 2021 Australian Open and the 2022 Wimbledon Championships, both with compatriot Matthew Ebden.

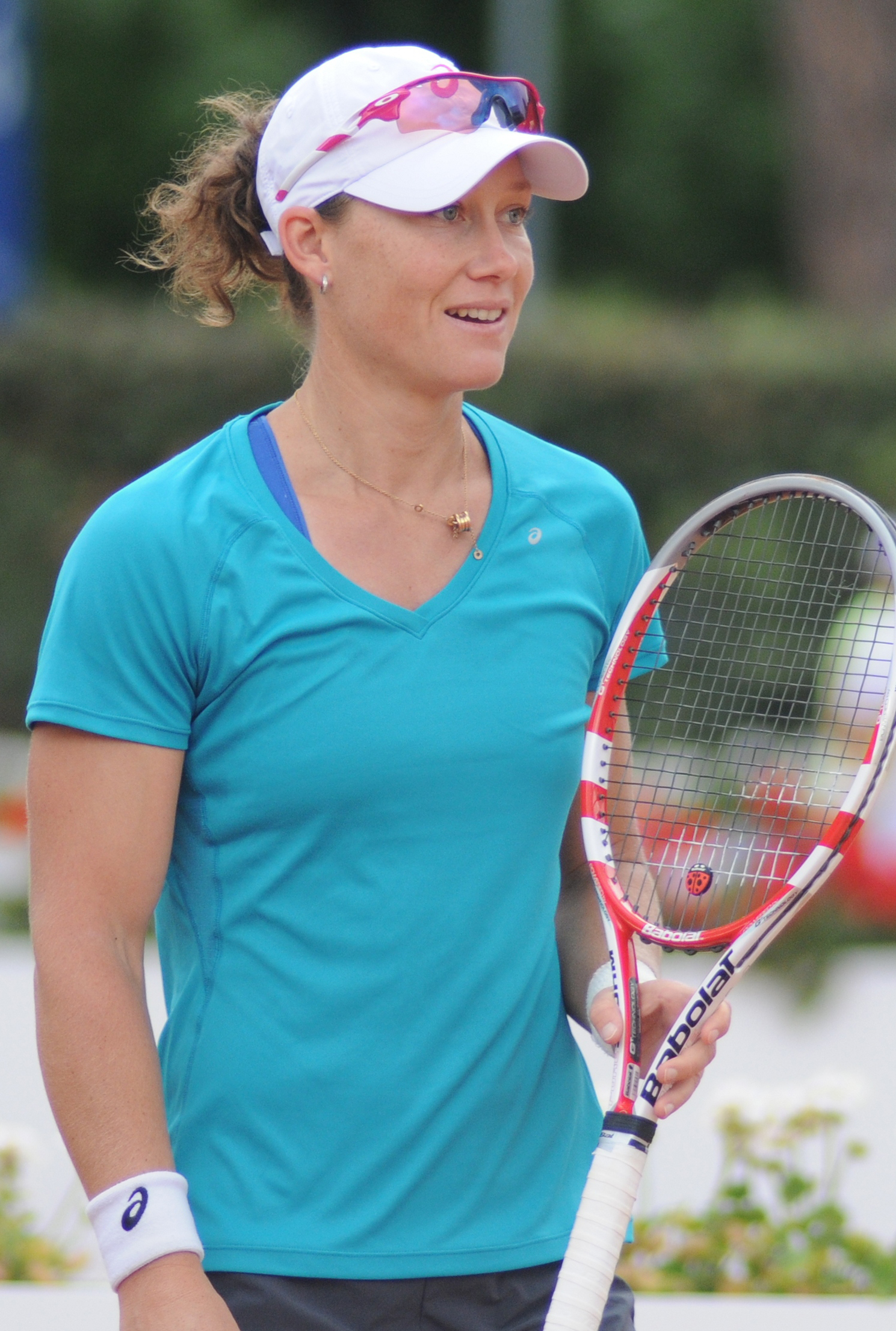
Stosur at the 2014 Italian Open.

== Performance timelines ==
Key
W	F	SF	QF	#R	RR	Q#	P#	DNQ	A	Z#	PO	G	S	B	NMS	NTI	P	NH

(W) winner; (F) finalist; (SF) semifinalist; (QF) quarterfinalist; (#R) rounds 4, 3, 2, 1; (RR) round-robin stage; (Q#) qualification round; (P#) preliminary round; (DNQ) did not qualify; (A) absent; (Z#) Davis/Fed Cup Zonal Group (with number indication) or (PO) play-off; (G) gold, (S) silver or (B) bronze Olympic/Paralympic medal; (NMS) not a Masters tournament; (NTI) not a Tier I tournament; (P) postponed; (NH) not held; (SR) strike rate (events won / competed); (W–L) win–loss record.
To avoid confusion and double counting, these charts are updated at the conclusion of a tournament or when the player's participation has ended.

Only main-draw results in WTA Tour, Grand Slam tournaments, Billie Jean King Cup (Fed Cup), Hopman Cup and Olympic Games are included in win–loss records.

=== Singles ===
Tournament	2000	2001	2002	2003	2004	2005	2006	2007	2008	2009	2010	2011	2012	2013	2014	2015	2016	2017	2018	2019	2020	2021	2022	SR	W–L	Win %
Grand Slam tournaments
Australian Open	Q1	Q1	1R	3R	2R	1R	4R	2R	A	3R	4R	3R	1R	2R	3R	2R	1R	1R	1R	1R	1R	2R	2R	0 / 20	20–20	50%
French Open	A	A	A	Q1	1R	2R	1R	3R	2R	SF	F	3R	SF	3R	4R	3R	SF	4R	3R	2R	A	A	A	0 / 16	40–16	71%
Wimbledon	A	A	A	1R	1R	1R	2R	2R	2R	3R	1R	1R	2R	3R	1R	3R	2R	A	2R	1R	NH	1R	A	0 / 17	12–17	41%
US Open	A	A	A	Q2	2R	1R	1R	1R	1R	2R	QF	W	QF	1R	2R	4R	2R	A	1R	1R	A	1R	A	1 / 16	22–15	59%
Win–loss	0–0	0–0	0–1	2–2	2–4	1–4	4–4	4–4	2–3	10–4	13–4	11–3	10–4	5–4	6–4	8–4	6–3	3–2	3–4	1–4	0–1	1–3	1–1	1 / 69	94–68	58%
Year-end championships
WTA Finals	DNQ										SF	SF	RR	DNQ							NH	DNQ		0 / 3	4–6	40%
WTA Elite Trophy	NH									RR	DNQ			F	A	A	RR	DNQ			NH			0 / 3	4–5	44%
National representation
Summer Olympics	A	NH			1R	NH			2R	NH			1R	NH			3R	NH				1R	NH	0 / 5	3–5	38%
Billie Jean King Cup	A	A	A	1R	1R	ZG1	PO2	PO2	A	PO2	PO	QF	PO	QF	SF	QF	PO	A	PO	F	A (Note: Edition is split into the two years due to COVID-19.)			0 / 6	29–20	59%
WTA 1000 + former^{†} tournaments
Dubai / Qatar Open (Note: The first Premier 5 event of the year has switched back and forth between the Dubai Tennis Championships and the Qatar Total Open since 2009. Dubai was classified as a Premier 5 event from 2009 to 2011 before being succeeded by Doha for the 2012–2014 period. In 2015, Dubai regained its Premier 5 status while Doha was demoted to Premier status. The Premier 5 tournaments were reclassified as WTA 1000 tournaments in 2021.)	NH	NMS								2R	1R	QF	F	QF	2R	2R	A	2R	2R	A	A	A	A	0 / 9	13–9	59%
Indian Wells Open	A	A	A	A	3R	3R	2R	3R	A	2R	SF	3R	3R	QF (Note: Withdraw during the tournament. Not counted as a loss.)	3R	3R	4R	2R	2R	1R	NH	A	A	0 / 15	20–14	59%
Miami Open	A	A	A	A	Q1	1R	2R	3R	A	QF	QF	4R	4R	A	3R	3R	2R	4R	1R	3R	NH	A	A	0 / 13	19–13	59%
Berlin / Madrid Open (Note: In 2009, the Berlin Open was replaced by the Madrid Open. The Premier Mandatory tournaments were reclassified as WTA 1000 tournaments in 2021.)	A	A	A	A	Q1	A	A	1R	A	2R	QF	3R	QF	1R	3R	3R	SF	3R	2R	Q1	NH	A	A	0 / 11	19–11	63%
Italian Open	A	A	A	A	Q1	2R	2R	3R	2R	1R	A	F	3R	QF	3R	1R	2R	1R	1R	Q2	A	A	A	0 / 13	16–13	55%
Canadian Open	A	A	A	A	A	A	A	A	A	QF	A	F	3R	3R	2R	1R	2R	A	Q1	A	NH	A	A	0 / 7	13–7	65%
Cincinnati Open	NH				NMS					A	A	QF	QF	3R	2R	1R	2R	A	Q1	A	A	1R	A	0 / 7	7–7	50%
Pan Pacific / Wuhan Open (Note: In 2014, the Toray Pan Pacific Open was downgraded to a Premier event and replaced by the Wuhan Open. The Premier 5 tournaments were reclassified as WTA 1000 tournaments in 2021.)	A	A	A	A	A	A	QF	QF	A	2R	2R	2R	SF	3R	1R	1R	1R	1R	1R	1R	NH			0 / 13	10–13	43%
China Open	NH				NMS					1R	1R	2R	2R	1R	SF	2R	1R	2R	1R	Q1	NH			0 / 10	6–10	38%
Charleston Open^{†}	A	A	A	A	A	2R	1R	1R	A	NH/NMS														0 / 3	1–3	25%
Southern California Open^{†}	NMS				A	1R	2R	A	A	NH/NMS														0 / 2	1–2	33%
Kremlin Cup^{†}	A	A	A	A	A	2R	2R	A	A	NH/NMS														0 / 2	2–2	50%
Zurich Open^{†}	A	A	A	A	A	A	2R	A	NH/NMS															0 / 1	1–1	50%
Win–loss	0–0	0–0	0–0	0–0	2–1	4–6	8–8	6–6	1–1	11–8	10–6	19–9	17–9	14–7	12–9	6–9	7–8	6–7	3–7	2–3	0–0	0–1	0–0	0 / 106	128–105	55%
Career statistics
	2000	2001	2002	2003	2004	2005	2006	2007	2008	2009	2010	2011	2012	2013	2014	2015	2016	2017	2018	2019	2020	2021	2022	SR	W–L	Win%
Tournaments	0	0	2	4	17	22	24	16	12	21	19	21	23	23	23	24	22	20	24	17	3	10	3	Career total: 350		
Titles	0	0	0	0	0	0	0	0	0	1	1	1	0	2	1	2	0	1	0	0	0	0	0	Career total: 9		
Finals	0	0	0	0	0	2	1	0	1	2	3	4	2	4	1	2	1	1	0	1	0	0	0	Career total: 25		
Hard win–loss	0–0	0–0	0–2	2–3	12–13	11–14	21–17	10–9	11–7	29–14	24–14	30–16	25–16	31–16	24–16	16–17	13–15	10–13	3–14	9–13	1–3	1–7	1–2	5 / 229	284–242	54%
Clay win–loss	0–0	0–0	0–0	0–0	3–4	3–5	6–5	6–7	2–2	6–4	20–3	12–5	18–5	8–5	8–5	15–5	16–7	12–6	9–7	4–3	0–0	0–0	0–1	4 / 80	148–79	65%
Grass win–loss	0–0	0–0	0–0	0–1	2–2	2–3	2–2	1–2	5–3	3–2	3–2	3–2	1–3	3–2	1–3	2–2	1–2	0–0	5–4	2–3	0–0	0–3	0–0	0 / 41	36–41	47%
Overall win–loss	0–0	0–0	0–2	2–4	17–19	16–22	29–24	17–18	18–12	38–20	47–19	45–23	44–24	42–23	33–24	33–24	30–24	22–19	17–25	15–19	1–3	1–10	1–3	9 / 350	468–362	56%
Win (%)	–	–	0%	33%	47%	42%	55%	49%	60%	66%	71%	66%	65%	65%	58%	58%	56%	54%	40%	44%	25%	9%	25%	Career total: 56%		
Year-end ranking	682	276	265	153	65	46	29	47	52	13	6	6	9	18	23	27	21	41	72	96	112	378	539	$20,051,140		

=== Doubles ===
Current through the 2023 Australian Open.

Tournament	2002	2003	2004	2005	2006	2007	2008	2009	2010	2011	2012	2013	2014	2015	2016	2017	2018	2019	2020	2021	2022	2023	SR	W–L	Win%
Grand Slam tournaments
Australian Open	1R	1R	2R	2R	F	SF	A	2R	1R	A	A	2R	2R	3R	2R	2R	A	W	1R	1R	2R	1R	1 / 18	26–17	60%
French Open	A	A	3R	3R	W	SF	3R	3R	3R	A	1R	3R	1R	3R	1R	1R	2R	QF	A	A	3R	A	1 / 16	30–15	67%
Wimbledon	A	2R	2R	SF	3R	SF	F	F	3R	F	2R	1R	3R	2R	A	A	1R	2R	NH	1R	1R	A	0 / 17	34–17	67%
US Open	A	2R	3R	W	SF	3R	F	SF	A	1R	A	2R	A	1R	2R	A	SF	1R	A	W	1R	A	2 / 15	36–13	73%
Win–loss	0–1	2–3	6–4	13–3	17–3	14–4	12–3	13–4	4–3	5–2	1–2	4–4	3–3	5–4	2–3	1–2	5–3	10–3	0–1	6–2	3–4	0–1	4 / 66	126–62	67%
National representation
Summer Olympics	NH		1R	NH			2R	NH			1R	NH			1R	NH				QF	NH		0 / 5	3–5	38%
Year-end championships
WTA Finals	DNQ			W	W	A	DNQ	SF	DNQ									SF	NH	RR	DNQ		2 / 5	7–5	58%
WTA 1000 + former^{†} tournaments
Dubai / Qatar Open	NMS						A	SF	SF	QF	1R	QF	A	2R	A	A	A	A	A	A	A	A	0 / 6	8–6	57%
Indian Wells Open	A	A	A	1R	W	W	A	2R	F	2R	QF	2R	SF	SF	1R	2R	1R	1R	NH	A	1R	A	2 / 14	25–13	66%
Miami Open	A	A	A	2R	W	W	A	QF	F	A	2R	A	1R	1R	2R	1R	A	F	NH	A	1R	A	2 / 12	23–10	70%
Madrid Open	NH							SF	2R	2R	2R	A	2R	A	A	2R	A	QF	NH	A	A	A	0 / 6	7–7	50%
Italian Open	A	A	A	1R	2R	2R	2R	2R	A	A	A	2R	1R	2R	A	1R	A	QF	A	A	A	A	0 / 9	4–10	29%
Canadian Open	A	A	A	A	A	A	A	F	A	A	A	A	1R	A	QF	A	A	A	NH	A	A	A	0 / 3	5–3	63%
Cincinnati Open	NH		NMS					A	A	A	A	A	A	A	A	A	A	A	A	W	1R	A	1 / 2	5–1	100%
Pan Pacific / Wuhan Open	A	A	A	A	W	W	F	1R	A	A	A	A	A	1R	A	A	A	2R	NH				2 / 5	12–4	75%
China Open	NMS							2R	A	A	1R	1R	1R	1R	A	A	A	2R	NH				0 / 6	1–6	14%
Charleston Open^{†}	A	A	A	QF	W	2R	A	NMS															1 / 3	4–2	67%
German Open^{†}	A	A	2R	A	A	W	A	Not held												NMS			1 / 2	4–1	80%
Southern California Open^{†}	NMS		A	2R	SF	A	NH		NMS				NH	NMS	Not held								0 / 2	2–2	50%
Kremlin Cup^{†}	A	A	A	W	1R	A	A	NMS											NH	NMS	NH		A	1 / 2	4–1
Zurich Open^{†}	A	A	A	SF	SF	A	NMS	Not held															0 / 2	4–2	67%
Career statistics
	2002	2003	2004	2005	2006	2007	2008	2009	2010	2011	2012	2013	2014	2015	2016	2017	2018	2019	2020	2021	2022	2023	SR	W–L	Win%
Tournaments	3	7	17	25	23	13	11	16	7	8	9	11	11	10	9	8	5	15	3	10	13	2	Career total: 236		
Titles	0	0	0	7	10	5	0	0	0	1	0	1	0	0	0	0	1	1	0	2	0	0	Career total: 28		
Finals	0	0	1	8	12	5	3	3	2	2	0	2	0	0	0	0	1	2	0	2	0	0	Career total: 43		
Overall win–loss	0–3	2–7	16–17	46–18	60–13	36–7	21–11	26–16	13–7	14–7	4–9	16–10	10–11	10–10	6–9	6–8	9–4	22–16	1–3	14–9	8–13	1–2	27 / 236	330–208	61%
Win%	0%	22%	48%	72%	82%	84%	66%	62%	65%	67%	31%	62%	46%	50%	40%	43%	69%	58%	25%	61%	38%	33%	Career total: 61%		
Year-end ranking	131	141	53	2	1	5	14	7	35	33	107	47	67	62	124	98	68	12	31	16	113				

=== Mixed doubles ===
Tournament	2005	2006	2007	2008	2009	2010	2011	2012	2013	2014	2015	2016	2017	2018	2019	2020	2021	2022	2023	SR	W–L
Australian Open	W	SF	QF	A	A	A	A	A	A	A	A	2R	SF	2R	2R	2R	F	2R	1R	1 / 11	26–10
French Open	SF	A	A	A	A	A	A	A	A	A	A	A	A	A	A	NH	A	QF	A	0 / 2	5–2
Wimbledon	QF	QF	3R	W	QF	3R	1R	A	A	W	A	1R	A	1R	1R	NH	2R	F	A	2 / 13	25–11
US Open	QF	A	A	2R	A	A	A	A	A	A	A	A	A	A	SF	NH	1R	QF	A	0 / 5	7–5
Win–loss	16–3	9–2	5–2	6–1	2–1	1–1	0–1	0–0	0–0	5–0	0–0	1–2	3–1	1–2	4–3	1–1	5–3	5–3	0–1	3 / 31	67–28
National representation
Summer Olympics	NH							QF	NH			1R	NH				A	NH		0 / 2	1–2

== Significant finals ==
=== Grand Slams ===
==== Singles: 2 (1 title, 1 runner-up) ====
Result	Year	Championship	Surface	Opponent	Score	Ref
Loss	2010	French Open	Clay	(Italy) Francesca Schiavone	4–6, 6–7^{(2–7)}	
Win	2011	US Open	Hard	(United States) Serena Williams	6–2, 6–3	

==== Doubles: 9 (4 titles, 5 runner-ups) ====
Result	Year	Championship	Surface	Partner	Opponents	Score
Win	2005	US Open	Hard	(United States) Lisa Raymond	(Russia) Elena Dementieva (Italy) Flavia Pennetta	6–2, 5–7, 6–3
Loss	2006	Australian Open	Hard	(United States) Lisa Raymond	(China) Yan Zi (China) Zheng Jie	6–2, 6–7^{(7–9)}, 3–6
Win	2006	French Open	Clay	(United States) Lisa Raymond	(Slovakia) Daniela Hantuchová (Japan) Ai Sugiyama	6–3, 6–2
Loss	2008	Wimbledon	Grass	(United States) Lisa Raymond	(United States) Serena Williams (United States) Venus Williams	2–6, 2–6
Loss	2008	US Open	Hard	(United States) Lisa Raymond	(Zimbabwe) Cara Black (United States) Liezel Huber	3–6, 6–7^{(6–8)}
Loss	2009	Wimbledon	Grass	(Australia) Rennae Stubbs	(United States) Serena Williams (United States) Venus Williams	6–7^{(4–7)}, 4–6
Loss	2011	Wimbledon	Grass	(Germany) Sabine Lisicki	(Czech Republic) Květa Peschke (Slovenia) Katarina Srebotnik	3–6, 1–6
Win	2019	Australian Open	Hard	(China) Zhang Shuai	(Hungary) Tímea Babos (France) Kristina Mladenovic	6–3, 6–4
Win	2021	US Open	Hard	(China) Zhang Shuai	(United States) Coco Gauff (United States) Caty McNally	6–3, 3–6, 6–3

==== Mixed doubles: 5 (3 titles, 2 runner-ups) ====
Result	Year	Championship	Surface	Partner	Opponents	Score
Win	2005	Australian Open	Hard	(Australia) Scott Draper	(South Africa) Liezel Huber (Zimbabwe) Kevin Ullyett	6–2, 2–6, [10–6]
Win	2008	Wimbledon	Grass	(United States) Bob Bryan	(Slovenia) Katarina Srebotnik (United States) Mike Bryan	7–5, 6–4
Win	2014	Wimbledon (2)	Grass	(Serbia) Nenad Zimonjić	(Belarus) Max Mirnyi (Chinese Taipei) Chan Hao-ching	6–4, 6–2
Loss	2021	Australian Open	Hard	(Australia) Matthew Ebden	(Czech Republic) Barbora Krejčíková (United States) Rajeev Ram	1–6, 4–6
Loss	2022	Wimbledon	Grass	(Australia) Matthew Ebden	(United States) Desirae Krawczyk (United Kingdom) Neal Skupski	4–6, 3–6

=== WTA Finals ===
==== Doubles: 2 (2 titles) ====
Result	Year	Championship	Surface	Opponents	Opponents	Score
Win	2005	WTA Finals Los Angeles	Hard	(United States) Lisa Raymond	(Zimbabwe) Cara Black; (Australia) Rennae Stubbs	6–7^{(5–7)}, 7–5, 6–4
Win	2006	WTA Finals Madrid (2)	Hard	(United States) Lisa Raymond	(Zimbabwe) Cara Black (Australia) Rennae Stubbs	3–6, 6–3, 6–3

=== WTA 1000 ===
==== Singles: 3 (3 runner-ups) ====
Result	Year	Tournament	Surface	Opponent	Score
Loss	2011	Italian Open	Clay	(Russia) Maria Sharapova	2–6, 4–6
Loss	2011	Canadian Open	Hard	(United States) Serena Williams	4–6, 2–6
Loss	2012	Qatar Open	Hard	(Belarus) Victoria Azarenka	1–6, 2–6

==== Doubles: 15 (10 titles, 5 runner-ups) ====
Result	Year	Tournament	Surface	Partner	Opponents	Score
Win	2005	Kremlin Cup	Carpet (i)	(United States) Lisa Raymond	(Zimbabwe) Cara Black; (Australia) Rennae Stubbs	6–2, 6–4
Win	2006	Pan Pacific Open	Carpet (i)	(United States) Lisa Raymond	(Zimbabwe) Cara Black (Australia) Rennae Stubbs	6–2, 6–1
Win	2006	Indian Wells Open	Hard	(United States) Lisa Raymond	(Spain) Virginia Ruano Pascual; (United States) Meghann Shaughnessy	6–2, 7–5
Win	2006	Miami Open	Hard	(United States) Lisa Raymond	(South Africa) Liezel Huber; (United States) Martina Navratilova	6–4, 7–5
Win	2006	Charleston Open	Clay	(United States) Lisa Raymond	(Spain) Virginia Ruano Pascual; (United States) Meghann Shaughnessy	3–6, 6–1, 6–1
Win	2007	Pan Pacific Open (2)	Carpet (i)	(United States) Lisa Raymond	(United States) Vania King (Australia) Rennae Stubbs	7–6^{(8–6)}, 3–6, 7–5
Win	2007	Indian Wells Open (2)	Hard	(United States) Lisa Raymond	(Chinese Taipei) Chan Yung-jan; (Chinese Taipei) Chuang Chia-jung	6–3, 7–5
Win	2007	Miami Open (2)	Hard	(United States) Lisa Raymond	(Zimbabwe) Cara Black (South Africa) Liezel Huber	6–4, 3–6, [10–2]
Win	2007	German Open	Clay	(United States) Lisa Raymond	(Italy) Tathiana Garbin; (Italy) Roberta Vinci	6–3, 6–4
Loss	2008	Pan Pacific Open	Hard	(United States) Lisa Raymond	(United States) Vania King (Russia) Nadia Petrova	1–6, 4–6
Loss	2009	Canadian Open	Hard	(Australia) Rennae Stubbs	(Spain) Nuria Llagostera Vives; (Spain) María José Martínez Sánchez	6–2, 5–7, [9–11]
Loss	2010	Indian Wells Open	Hard	(Russia) Nadia Petrova	(Czech Republic) Květa Peschke; (Slovenia) Katarina Srebotnik	4–6, 6–2, [5–10]
Loss	2010	Miami Open	Hard	(Russia) Nadia Petrova	(Argentina) Gisela Dulko; (Italy) Flavia Pennetta	3–6, 6–4, [7–10]
Loss	2019	Miami Open	Hard	(China) Zhang Shuai	(Belgium) Elise Mertens; (Belarus) Aryna Sabalenka	6–7^{(5–7)}, 2–6
Win	2021	Cincinnati Masters	Hard	(China) Zhang Shuai	(Canada) Gabriela Dabrowski; (Brazil) Luisa Stefani	7–5, 6–3

== WTA Tour finals ==
=== Singles: 25 (9 titles, 16 runner-ups) ===
Legend Grand Slam tournaments (1–1) Elite (0–1) WTA 1000 (Premier 5) (0–3) WTA 500 (Tier II / Premier) (2–5) WTA 250 (Tier III / Tier IV / International) (6–6)	Finals by surface Hard (5–11) Clay (4–5)

Result	W–L	Date	Tournament	Tier	Surface	Opponent	Score
Loss	0–1	Jan 2005	Gold Coast Championships, Australia	Tier III	Hard	(Switzerland) Patty Schnyder	6–1, 3–6, 5–7
Loss	0–2	Jan 2005	Sydney International, Australia	Tier II	Hard	(Australia) Alicia Molik	7–6^{(7–5)}, 4–6, 5–7
Loss	0–3	May 2006	Prague Open, Czech Republic	Tier IV	Clay	(Israel) Shahar Pe'er	6–4, 2–6, 1–6
Loss	0–4	Sep 2008	Korea Open, South Korea	Tier IV	Hard	(Russia) Maria Kirilenko	6–2, 1–6, 4–6
Loss	0–5	Aug 2009	LA Championships, United States	Premier	Hard	(Italy) Flavia Pennetta	4–6, 3–6
Win	1–5	Oct 2009	Japan Open, Japan	International	Hard	(Italy) Francesca Schiavone	7–5, 6–1
Win	2–5	Apr 2010	Charleston Open, United States	Premier	Clay	(Russia) Vera Zvonareva	6–0, 6–3
Loss	2–6	May 2010	Stuttgart Grand Prix, Germany	Premier	Clay (i)	(Belgium) Justine Henin	4–6, 6–2, 1–6
Loss	2–7	Jun 2010	French Open, France	Grand Slam	Clay	(Italy) Francesca Schiavone	4–6, 6–7^{(2–7)}
Loss	2–8	May 2011	Italian Open, Italy	Premier 5	Clay	(Russia) Maria Sharapova	2–6, 4–6
Loss	2–9	Aug 2011	Canadian Open, Canada	Premier 5	Hard	(United States) Serena Williams	4–6, 2–6
Win	3–9	Sep 2011	US Open, United States	Grand Slam	Hard	(United States) Serena Williams	6–2, 6–3
Loss	3–10	Oct 2011	Japan Open, Japan	International	Hard	(France) Marion Bartoli	3–6, 1–6
Loss	3–11	Feb 2012	Qatar Ladies Open, Qatar	Premier 5	Hard	(Belarus) Victoria Azarenka	1–6, 2–6
Loss	3–12	Oct 2012	Kremlin Cup, Russia	Premier	Hard (i)	(Denmark) Caroline Wozniacki	2–6, 6–4, 5–7
Win	4–12	Aug 2013	Southern California Open, United States	Premier	Hard	(Belarus) Victoria Azarenka	6–2, 6–3
Win	5–12	Oct 2013	Japan Open, Japan (2)	International	Hard	(Canada) Eugenie Bouchard	3–6, 7–5, 6–2
Loss	5–13	Oct 2013	Kremlin Cup, Russia	Premier	Hard (i)	(Romania) Simona Halep	6–7^{(1–7)}, 2–6
Loss	5–14	Nov 2013	Tournament of Champions Sofia, Bulgaria	Elite (Note: Formerly known as WTA Tournament of Champions until 2015.)	Hard (i)	(Romania) Simona Halep	6–2, 2–6, 2–6
Win	6–14	Oct 2014	Japan Open, Japan (3)	International	Hard	(Kazakhstan) Zarina Diyas	7–6^{(9–7)}, 6–3
Win	7–14	May 2015	Internationaux de Strasbourg, France	International	Clay	(France) Kristina Mladenovic	3–6, 6–2, 6–3
Win	8–14	Jul 2015	Gastein Ladies, Austria	International	Clay	(Italy) Karin Knapp	3–6, 7–6^{(7–3)}, 6–2
Loss	8–15	Apr 2016	Prague Open, Czech Republic	International	Clay	(Czech Republic) Lucie Šafářová	6–3, 1–6, 4–6
Win	9–15	May 2017	Internationaux de Strasbourg, France (2)	International	Clay	(Australia) Daria Gavrilova	5–7, 6–4, 6–3
Loss	9–16	Sep 2019	Guangzhou Open, China	International	Hard	(United States) Sofia Kenin	7–6^{(7–4)}, 4–6, 2–6

=== Doubles: 43 (28 titles, 15 runner-ups) ===
Legend Grand Slam tournaments (4–5) Finals (2–0) WTA 1000 (Tier I / Premier 5 / Premier M) (10–5) WTA 500 (Tier II / Premier) (9–3) WTA 250 (Tier III / International) (3–2)	Finals by surface Hard (19–11) Grass (1–4) Clay (5–0) Carpet (3–0)

Result	W–L	Date	Tournament	Tier	Surface	Partner	Opponents	Score
Loss	0–1	Nov 2004	Tournoi de Québec, Canada	Tier III	Hard	(Belgium) Els Callens	(United States) Carly Gullickson; (Argentina) María Emilia Salerni	5–7, 5–7
Win	1–1	Jan 2005	Sydney International, Australia	Tier II	Hard	(Australia) Bryanne Stewart	(Russia) Elena Dementieva; (Japan) Ai Sugiyama	w/o
Win	2–1	Apr 2005	Amelia Island Championships, United States	Tier II	Clay	(Australia) Bryanne Stewart	(Czech Republic) Květa Peschke; (Switzerland) Patty Schnyder	6–4, 6–2
Winn	3–1	Aug 2005	Connecticut Open, United States	Tier II	Hard	(United States) Lisa Raymond	(Argentina) Gisela Dulko; (Russia) Maria Kirilenko	6–2, 6–7^{(1–7)}, 6–1
Win	4–1	Sep 2005	US Open, United States	Grand Slam	Hard	(United States) Lisa Raymond	(Russia) Elena Dementieva; (Italy) Flavia Pennetta	6–2, 5–7, 6–3
Win	5–1	Oct 2005	Luxembourg Open, Luxembourg	Tier II	Hard (i)	(United States) Lisa Raymond	(Zimbabwe) Cara Black; (Australia) Rennae Stubbs	7–5, 6–1
Win	6–1	Oct 2005	Kremlin Cup, Russia	Tier I	Carpet	(United States) Lisa Raymond	(Zimbabwe) Cara Black (Australia) Rennae Stubbs	6–2, 6–4
Loss	6–2	Nov 2005	Philadelphia Championships, United States	Tier II	Hard	(United States) Lisa Raymond	(Zimbabwe) Cara Black (Australia) Rennae Stubbs	4–6, 6–7^{(4–7)}
Win	7–2	Nov 2005	WTA Finals, United States	Finals	Hard	(United States) Lisa Raymond	(Zimbabwe) Cara Black (Australia) Rennae Stubbs	6–7, 7–5, 6–4
Loss	7–3	Jan 2006	Australian Open, Australia	Grand Slam	Hard	(United States) Lisa Raymond	(China) Yan Zi; (China) Zheng Jie	6–2, 6–7^{(7–9)}, 3–6
Win	8–3	Feb 2006	Pan Pacific Open, Japan	Tier I	Carpet	(United States) Lisa Raymond	(Zimbabwe) Cara Black (Australia) Rennae Stubbs	6–2, 6–1
Win	9–3	Feb 2006	Memphis Indoors, United States	Tier III	Hard	(United States) Lisa Raymond	(Belarus) Victoria Azarenka; (Denmark) Caroline Wozniacki	7–6, 6–3
Win	10–3	Mar 2006	Indian Wells Open, United States	Tier I	Hard	(United States) Lisa Raymond	(Spain) Virginia Ruano Pascual; (United States) Meghann Shaughnessy	6–2, 7–5
Win	11–3	Apr 2006	Miami Open, United States	Tier I	Hard	(United States) Lisa Raymond	(South Africa) Liezel Huber; (United States) Martina Navratilova	6–4, 7–5
Win	12–3	Apr 2006	Charleston Open, United States	Tier I	Clay	(United States) Lisa Raymond	(Spain) Virginia Ruano Pascual (United States) Meghann Shaughnessy	3–6, 6–1, 6–1
Win	13–3	Jun 2006	French Open, France	Grand Slam	Clay	(United States) Lisa Raymond	(Slovakia) Daniela Hantuchová (Japan) Ai Sugiyama	6–3, 6–2
Loss	13–4	Aug 2006	Connecticut Open, United States	Tier II	Hard	(United States) Lisa Raymond	(China) Yan Zi; (China) Zheng Jie	4–6, 2–6
Win	14–4	Oct 2006	Stuttgart Grand Prix, Germany	Tier II	Hard (i)	(United States) Lisa Raymond	(Zimbabwe) Cara Black (Australia) Rennae Stubbs	6–3, 6–4
Win	15–4	Oct 2006	Ladies Linz, Austria	Tier II	Hard	(United States) Lisa Raymond	(United States) Corina Morariu; (Slovenia) Katarina Srebotnik	6–3, 6–0
Win	16–4	Nov 2006	Hasselt Cup, Belgium	Tier III	Hard	(United States) Lisa Raymond	(Greece) Eleni Daniilidou; (Germany) Jasmin Wöhr	6–2, 6–3
Win	17–4	Nov 2006	WTA Finals, Spain (2)	Finals	Hard	(United States) Lisa Raymond	(Zimbabwe) Cara Black (Australia) Rennae Stubbs	3–6, 6–3, 6–3
Win	18–4	Feb 2007	Pan Pacific Open, Japan (2)	Tier I	Carpet	(United States) Lisa Raymond	(United States) Vania King (Australia) Rennae Stubbs	7–6^{(8–6)}, 3–6, 7–5
Win	19–4	Mar 2007	Indian Wells Open, United States (2)	Tier I	Hard	(United States) Lisa Raymond	(Chinese Taipei) Chan Yung-jan; (Chinese Taipei) Chuang Chia-jung	6–3, 7–5
Win	20–4	Apr 2007	Miami Open, United States(2)	Tier I	Hard	(United States) Lisa Raymond	(Zimbabwe) Cara Black (South Africa) Liezel Huber	6–4, 3–6, [10–2]
Win	21–4	May 2007	German Open, Germany	Tier I	Clay	(United States) Lisa Raymond	(Italy) Tathiana Garbin; (Italy) Roberta Vinci	6–3, 6–4
Winner	22–4	Jun 2007	Eastbourne International, United Kingdom	Tier II	Grass	(United States) Lisa Raymond	(Czech Republic) Květa Peschke (Australia) Rennae Stubbs	6–7^{(5–7)}, 6–4, 6–3
Loss	22–5	Jul 2008	Wimbledon, United Kingdom	Grand Slam	Grass	(United States) Lisa Raymond	(United States) Serena Williams; (United States) Venus Williams	2–6, 2–6
Loss	22–6	Sep 2008	US Open, United States	Grand Slam	Hard	(United States) Lisa Raymond	(Zimbabwe) Cara Black (United States) Liezel Huber	3–6, 6–7^{(6–8)}
Loss	22–7	Sep 2008	Pan Pacific Open, Japan	Tier I	Hard	(United States) Lisa Raymond	(United States) Vania King (Russia) Nadia Petrova	1–6, 4–6
Loss	22–8	Jun 2009	Eastbourne International, United Kingdom	Premier	Grass	(Australia) Rennae Stubbs	(Japan) Ai Sugiyama (Uzbekistan) Akgul Amanmuradova	4–6, 3–6
Loss	22–9	Jul 2009	Wimbledon, United Kingdom	Grand Slam	Grass	(Australia) Rennae Stubbs	(United States) Serena Williams (United States) Venus Williams	6–7^{(4–7)}, 4–6
Loss	22–10	Aug 2009	Canadian Open, Canada	Premier 5	Hard	(Australia) Rennae Stubbs	(Spain) Nuria Llagostera Vives; (Spain) María José Martínez Sánchez	6–2, 5–7, [9–11]
Loss	22–11	Mar 2010	Indian Wells Open, United States	Premier M	Hard	(Russia) Nadia Petrova	(Czech Republic) Květa Peschke (Slovenia) Katarina Srebotnik	6–4, 2–6, [5–10]
Loss	22–12	Apr 2010	Miami Open, United States	Premier M	Hard	(Russia) Nadia Petrova	(Argentina) Gisela Dulko (Italy) Flavia Pennetta	3–6, 6–4, [7–10]
Win	23–12	Apr 2011	Stuttgart Grand Prix, Germany (2)	Premier	Clay (i)	(Germany) Sabine Lisicki	(Germany) Kristina Barrois (Germany) Jasmin Wöhr	6–1, 7–6^{(7–5)}
Loss	23–13	Jul 2011	Wimbledon, United Kingdom	Grand Slam	Grass	(Germany) Sabine Lisicki	(Czech Republic) Květa Peschke (Slovenia) Katarina Srebotnik	3–6, 1–6
Loss	23–14	Oct 2013	Japan Open, Japan	International	Hard	(China) Zhang Shuai	(France) Kristina Mladenovic (Italy) Flavia Pennetta	4–6, 3–6
Win	24–14	Oct 2013	Kremlin Cup, Russia (2)	Premier	Hard (i)	(Russia) Svetlana Kuznetsova	(Russia) Alla Kudryavtseva; (Australia) Anastasia Rodionova	6–1, 1–6, [10–8]
Win	25–14	Oct 2018	Hong Kong Open, China SAR	International	Hard	(China) Zhang Shuai	(Japan) Shuko Aoyama; (Belarus) Lidziya Marozava	6–4, 6–4
Win	26–14	Jan 2019	Australian Open, Australia	Grand Slam	Hard	(China) Zhang Shuai	(Hungary) Tímea Babos (France) Kristina Mladenovic	6–3, 6–4
Loss	26–15	Mar 2019	Miami Open, United States	Premier M	Hard	(China) Zhang Shuai	(Belgium) Elise Mertens; (Belarus) Aryna Sabalenka	6–7^{(5–7)}, 2–6
Win	27–15	Aug 2021	Cincinnati Open, United States	WTA 1000	Hard	(China) Zhang Shuai	(Canada) Gabriela Dabrowski; (Brazil) Luisa Stefani	7–5, 6–3
Win	28–15	Sep 2021	US Open, United States	Grand Slam	Hard	(China) Zhang Shuai	(United States) Coco Gauff (United States) Caty McNally	6–3, 3–6, 6–3

== ITF Circuit finals ==
=== Singles: 7 (4 titles, 3 runner–ups) ===
Legend $25,000 tournaments (1–1) $10,000 tournaments (3–2)	Finals by surface Hard (4–2) Grass (0–1)

Result	W–L	Date	Tournament	Tier	Surface	Opponent	Score
Loss	0–1	Mar 2001	ITF Warrnambool, Australia	10,000	Grass	(Japan) Miho Saeki	4–6, 4–6
Loss	0–2	Sep 2001	ITF Kugayama, Japan	10,000	Hard	(Japan) Shiho Hisamatsu	6–7^{(4–7)}, 3–6
Win	1–2	Sep 2001	ITF Ibaraki, Japan	10,000	Hard	(Australia) Nicole Kriz	6–0, 6–1
Win	2–2	Sep 2001	ITF Osaka, Japan	10,000	Hard	(Australia) Beti Sekulovski	6–2, 3–6, 7–5
Win	3–2	Sep 2001	ITF Kyoto, Japan	10,000	Hard	(South Korea) Kim Jin-hee	6–1, 7–5
Win	4–2	Oct 2001	ITF Cairns, Australia	25,000	Hard	(Australia) Bryanne Stewart	7–5, 6–4
Loss	4–3	Oct 2002	ITF Rockhampton, Australia	25,000	Hard	(Australia) Evie Dominikovic	1–6, 3–6

=== Doubles: 21 (11 titles, 10 runner–ups) ===
Legend $75,000 tournaments (0–1) $50,000 tournaments (0–2) $25,000 tournaments (5–6) $10,000 tournaments (6–1)	Finals by surface Hard (8–7) Clay (1–3) Grass (2–0)

Result	W–L	Date	Tournament	Tier	Surface	Partner	Opponents	Score
Win	1–0	Mar 2001	ITF Benalla, Australia	10,000	Grass	(Australia) Monique Adamczak	(Netherlands) Debby Haak; (Netherlands) Jolanda Mens	6–3, 7–5
Loss	1–1	Sep 2001	ITF Kugayama, Japan	10,000	Hard	(Australia) Melissa Dowse	(Japan) Seiko Okamoto; (Japan) Nami Urabe	4–6, 6–2, 1–6
Win	2–1	Sep 2001	ITF Ibaraki, Japan	10,000	Hard	(Australia) Melissa Dowse	(Australia) Beti Sekulovski; (Australia) Sarah Stone	6–3, 7–5
Win	3–1	Sep 2001	ITF Osaka, Japan	10,000	Hard	(Australia) Melissa Dowse	(Australia) Beti Sekulovski (Australia) Sarah Stone	5–7, 6–3, 6–3
Win	4–1	Oct 2001	ITF Kyoto, Japan	10,000	Hard	(Australia) Melissa Dowse	(Japan) Seiko Okamoto (Japan) Nami Urabe	6–4, 4–6, 7–6^{(7–3)}
Win	5–1	Nov 2001	ITF Nurioopta, Australia	25,000	Hard	(Australia) Evie Dominikovic	(Australia) Catherine Barclay; (Australia) Christina Wheeler	6–1, 6–7^{(5–7)}, 6–4
Win	6–1	Nov 2001	ITF Mount Gambier, Australia	25,000	Hard	(Australia) Evie Dominikovic	(Australia) Amanda Grahame; (Australia) Cindy Watson	6–4, 6–4
Win	7–1	Feb 2002	ITF Bendigo, Australia	25,000	Hard	(Australia) Sarah Stone	(Australia) Trudi Musgrave (Australia) Cindy Watson	6–4, 6–3
Win	8–1	Mar 2002	ITF Warrnambool, Australia	10,000	Grass	(Australia) Sarah Stone	(United States) Amanda Augustus; (Republic of Ireland) Claire Curran	6–0, 4–6, 6–3
Win	9–1	Jun 2002	ITF Lenzerheide, Switzerland	25,000	Clay	(Australia) Nicole Sewell	(Belgium) Leslie Butkiewicz; (Belgium) Patty Van Acker	6–4, 6–3
Loss	9–2	Jun 2002	ITF Båstad, Sweden	25,000	Clay	(Australia) Nicole Sewell	(Germany) Andrea Glass; (Czech Republic) Dominika Luzarová	4–6, 1–6
Loss	9–3	Jul 2002	ITF Saint-Gaudens, France	50,000	Clay	(Australia) Sarah Stone	(Slovakia) Ľudmila Cervanová (Slovakia) Stanislava Hrozenská	6–7^{(5–7)}, 4–6
Win	10–3	Aug 2002	ITF Bath, England	25,000	Hard	(Australia) Sarah Stone	(Greece) Asimina Kaplani; (Greece) Maria Pavlidou	6–4, 6–1
Loss	10–4	Sep 2002	ITF Bordeaux, France	75,000	Clay	(Australia) Sarah Stone	(Italy) Flavia Pennetta; (Romania) Andreea Vanc	3–6, 5–7
Loss	10–5	Sep 2002	ITF Glasgow, Scotland	25,000	Hard	(Australia) Sarah Stone	(Republic of Ireland) Yvonne Doyle; (Republic of Ireland) Elsa O'Riain	2–6, 4–6
Loss	10–6	Oct 2002	ITF Mackay, Australia	25,000	Hard	(Australia) Sarah Stone	(South Africa) Natalie Grandin; (Australia) Nicole Sewell	3–6, 6–1, 4–6
Loss	10–7	Oct 2002	ITF Rockhampton, Australia	25,000	Hard	(Australia) Sarah Stone	(Australia) Evie Dominikovic (Australia) Bryanne Stewart	5–7, 6–4, 5–7
Win	11–7	Oct 2002	ITF Dalby, Australia	25,000	Hard	(Australia) Sarah Stone	(Australia) Evie Dominikovic (Australia) Bryanne Stewart	6–3, 6–3
Loss	11–8	Nov 2003	ITF Nurioopta, Australia	25,000	Hard	(Australia) Bryanne Stewart	(Australia) Lisa McShea (Australia) Trudi Musgrave	6–4, 3–6, 5–7
Loss	11–9	Nov 2003	ITF Mount Gambier, Australia	25,000	Hard	(Australia) Bryanne Stewart	(United States) Jessica Lehnhoff (Australia) Christina Wheeler	5–7, 2–6
Loss	11–10	Nov 2004	ITF Pittsburgh, United States	50,000	Hard	(Belgium) Els Callens	(United States) Teryn Ashley; (United States) Laura Granville	6–2, 3–6, 4–6

== WTA Tour career earnings ==
Stosur earned more than 20 million dollars during her career.

Year	Grand Slam titles (Note: Includes singles, doubles and mixed doubles titles.)	WTA titles	Total titles	Earnings ($)	Money list rank
2003	0	0	0	70,219	140
2004	0	0	0	155,183	81
2005	2	6	8	775,962	16
2006	1	9	10	982,257	9
2007	0	5	5	572,712	26
2008	1	0	1	527,685	31
2009	0	1	1	1,179,681	12
2010	0	1	1	2,090,340	8
2011	1	1	2	3,476,153	5
2012	0	0	0	1,936,184	10
2013	0	3	3	1,230,152	17
2014	1	1	2	1,055,960	24
2015	0	2	2	944,416	32
2016	0	0	0	1,352,051	25
2017	0	1	1	682,346	46
2018	0	1	1	701,050	53
2019	1	0	1	1,146,514	37
2020	0	0	0	106,745	178
2021	1	1	2	739,482	45
2022	0	0	0	274,438	152
Career	8	32	40	20,051,140	22

== Career Grand Slam statistics ==
=== Grand Slam tournament seedings ===
The tournaments won by Stosur are in boldface, and advanced into finals by Stosur are in italics.

==== Singles ====
Legend (slams won / times seeded) seeded No. 4–10 (**1** / 13) seeded No. 11–32 (0 / 24) unseeded (0 / 23) wild card (0 / 9)	Longest streak 16 16 11 2

Year	Australian Open	French Open	Wimbledon	US Open
2000	did not qualify	absent	absent	absent
2001	did not qualify	absent	absent	absent
2002	wild card	absent	absent	absent
2003	wild card	did not qualify	wild card	did not qualify
2004	wild card	unseeded	unseeded	unseeded
2005	unseeded	unseeded	unseeded	unseeded
2006	unseeded	unseeded	unseeded	unseeded
2007	24th	27th	27th	29th
2008	absent	wild card	wild card	unseeded
2009	unseeded	30th	18th	15th
2010	13th	7th (1)	6th	5th
2011	5th	8th	10th	**9th (1)**
2012	6th	6th	5th	7th
2013	9th	9th	14th	11th
2014	17th	19th	17th	24th
2015	20th	27th	22nd	22nd
2016	25th	21st	14th	16th
2017	18th	23rd	absent	absent
2018	unseeded	unseeded	unseeded	unseeded
2019	unseeded	unseeded	unseeded	wild card
2020	unseeded	absent	cancelled	absent
2021	wild card	absent	unseeded	unseeded
2022	wild card	absent	absent	absent

==== Doubles ====
Legend (slams won / times seeded) seeded No. 1 (**1** / 7) seeded No. 2 (0 / 1) seeded No. 3 (0 / 3) seeded No. 4–10 (**1** / 11) seeded No. 11–32 (**1** / 8) unseeded (**1** / 33) wild card (0 / 2)	Longest streak 7 1 2 3 3 15 1

Year	Australian Open	French Open	Wimbledon	US Open
2002	wild card	absent	absent	absent
2003	wild card	absent	unseeded	unseeded
2004	unseeded	unseeded	unseeded	unseeded
2005	unseeded	10th	11th	**6th (1)**
2006	1st (1)	**1st (2)**	1st	1st
2007	1st	1st	1st	2nd
2008	absent	12th	16th (2)	10th (3)
2009	5th	4th	3rd (4)	3rd
2010	5th	4th	3rd	absent
2011	absent	absent	unseeded (5)	unseeded
2012	absent	unseeded	unseeded	absent
2013	unseeded	unseeded	unseeded	unseeded
2014	unseeded	unseeded	unseeded	absent
2015	unseeded	unseeded	unseeded	unseeded
2016	11th	unseeded	absent	unseeded
2017	unseeded	unseeded	absent	absent
2018	absent	unseeded	unseeded	unseeded
2019	**unseeded (3)**	5th	5th	6th
2020	12th	absent	cancelled	absent
2021	10th	absent	unseeded	**14th (4)**
2022	4th	unseeded	12th	unseeded
2023	unseeded	absent	absent	absent

==== Mixed doubles ====
Legend (slams won / times seeded) seeded No. 1 (0 / 1) seeded No. 2 (0 / 2) seeded No. 3 (0 / 3) seeded No. 4–10 (0 / 5) seeded No. 11–32 (**1** / 1) unseeded (**1** / 11) wild card (**1** / 10)	Longest streak 1 1 2 1 1 2 2

Year	Australian Open	French Open	Wimbledon	US Open
2002	wild card	absent	absent	absent
2003	absent	absent	absent	absent
2004	absent	absent	absent	absent
2005	**wild card (1)**	unseeded	6th	unseeded
2006	5th	absent	4th	3rd
2007	3rd	absent	2nd	absent
2008	absent	absent	**unseeded (2)**	unseeded
2009	absent	absent	2nd	absent
2010	absent	absent	1st	absent
2011	absent	absent	unseeded	absent
2012	absent	absent	absent	absent
2013	wild card	absent	absent	absent
2014	absent	absent	**15th (3)**	absent
2015	absent	absent	absent	absent
2016	unseeded	absent	unseeded	absent
2017	wild card	absent	absent	absent
2018	wild card	absent	wild card	absent
2019	wild card	absent	unseeded	3rd
2020	7th	cancelled		
2021	wild card (1)	absent	unseeded	unseeded
2022	wild card	wild card	unseeded (2)	4th
2023	unseeded	absent	absent	absent

=== Best Grand Slam results details ===
Grand Slam winners are in boldface, and runner–ups are in italics.

==== Singles ====
**Australian Open**
**2006 Australian Open**
Round	Opponent	Rank	Score
1R	(France) Séverine Beltrame	95	6–3, 6–4
2R	(Serbia) Ana Ivanovic (21)	22	6–3, 7–5
3R	(Austria) Sybille Bammer	72	7–5, 4–6, 6–3
4R	(Switzerland) Martina Hingis (WC)	349	1–6, 6–7
**2010 Australian Open**
1R	(China) Xinyun Han	191	6–1, 3–6, 6–2
2R	(Germany) Kristina Barrois	81	7–5, 6–3
3R	(Italy) Alberta Brianti	73	6–4, 6–1
4R	(United States) **Serena Williams (1)**	1	4–6, 2–6

**Wimbledon Championships**
**2009 Wimbledon Championships**
Round	Opponent	Rank	Score
1R	(United States) Bethanie Mattek-Sands	57	6–4, 6–7, 6–2
2R	(Germany) Tatjana Maria	101	4–6, 7–6, 6–4
3R	(Serbia) Ana Ivanovic (13)	12	5–7, 2–6
**2013 Wimbledon Championships**
1R	(Slovakia) Anna Karolína Schmiedlová (LL)		6–1, 6–3
2R	(Russia) Olga Puchkova		6–2, 6–2
3R	(Germany) Sabine Lisicki (23)		6–4, 2–6, 1–6
**2015 Wimbledon Championships**
1R	(Montenegro) Danka Kovinić	92	6–4, 6–4
2R	(Poland) Urszula Radwanska	107	6–3, 6–4
3R	(United States) Coco Vandeweghe	47	2–6, 0–6

**French Open**
**2010 French Open**
Round	Opponent	Rank	Score
1R	(Romania) Simona Halep	114	7–5, 6–1
2R	(Paraguay) Rossana de los Ríos	102	4–6, 6–1, 6–0
3R	(Russia) Anastasia Pivovarova	187	6–3, 6–2
4R	(Belgium) Justine Henin (22)	23	2–6, 6–1, 6–4
QF	(United States) Serena Williams (1)	1	6–2, 6–7, 8–6
SF	(Serbia) Jelena Janković (4)	4	6–1, 6–2
F	(Italy) **Francesca Schiavone (17)**	17	4–6, 6–7

**US Open**
**2011 US Open**
Round	Opponent	Rank	Score
1R	(Sweden) Sofia Arvidsson	67	6–2, 6–3
2R	(United States) CoCo Vandeweghe	112	6–3, 6–4
3R	(Russia) Nadia Petrova (24)	30	7–6, 6–7, 7–5
4R	(Russia) Maria Kirilenko (25)	29	6–2, 6–7, 6–3
QF	(Russia) Vera Zvonareva (2)	2	6–3, 6–3
SF	(Germany) Angelique Kerber	92	6–3, 2–6, 6–2
**W**	(United States) Serena Williams (28)	27	6–2, 6–3

== Top 10 wins ==
Season	2006	2007	2008	2009	2010	2011	2012	2013	2014	2015	2016	Total
Wins	1	1	0	5	5	9	2	3	4	0	1	31

#	Player	vsRank	Tournament	Surface	Round	Score	SS Rank
2006
1.	(United States) Lindsay Davenport	10	LA Championships, US	Hard	3R	6–7^{(4–7)}, 6–4, 6–3	37
2007
2.	(France) Amélie Mauresmo	4	Italian Open	Clay	2R	7–5, 6–7^{(4–7)}, 7–6^{(9–7)}	29
2009
3.	(Russia) Dinara Safina	2	Miami Open, US	Hard	3R	6–1, 6–4	42
4.	(Russia) Elena Dementieva	4	French Open	Clay	3R	6–3, 4–6, 6–1	32
5.	(United States) Serena Williams	2	Silicon Valley Classic, US	Hard	QF	6–2, 3–6, 6–2	20
6.	(Russia) Svetlana Kuznetsova	6	Canadian Open	Hard	2R	6–4, 6–3	17
7.	(Denmark) Caroline Wozniacki	6	Japan Open	Hard	SF	6–0, 4–6, 6–4	15
2010
8.	(Serbia) Jelena Janković	8	Miami Open, US	Hard	4R	6–1, 7–6^{(11–9)}	10
9.	(United States) Serena Williams	1	French Open	Clay	QF	6–2, 6–7^{(2–7)}, 8–6	7
10.	(Serbia) Jelena Janković	4	French Open	Clay	SF	6–1, 6–2	7
11.	(Italy) Francesca Schiavone	6	WTA Finals, Qatar	Hard	RR	6–4, 6–4	7
12.	(Denmark) Caroline Wozniacki	1	WTA Finals, Qatar	Hard	RR	6–4, 6–3	7
2011
13.	(Russia) Vera Zvonareva	3	Stuttgart Open, Germany	Clay (i)	QF	2–6, 6–3, 7–6^{(7–3)}	7
14.	(Italy) Francesca Schiavone	5	Italian Open	Clay	QF	6–2, 6–4	7
15.	(China) Li Na	6	Italian Open	Clay	SF	7–6^{(8–6)}, 6–0	7
16.	(Russia) Vera Zvonareva	3	Eastbourne International, UK	Grass	QF	4–6, 7–6^{(7–4)}, 6–4	10
17.	(China) Li Na	6	Canadian Open	Hard	3R	6–2, 6–4	11
18.	(China) Li Na	5	Cincinnati Open, US	Hard	3R	6–4, 3–6, 6–4	10
19.	(Russia) Vera Zvonareva	2	US Open	Hard	QF	6–3, 6–3	10
20.	(Russia) Maria Sharapova	2	WTA Finals, Turkey	Hard (i)	RR	6–1, 7–5	7
21.	(China) Li Na	5	WTA Finals, Turkey	Hard (i)	RR	6–1, 6–0	7
2012
22.	(France) Marion Bartoli	7	Qatar Open	Hard	SF	6–3, ret.	5
23.	(Russia) Maria Sharapova	2	Pan Pacific Open, Japan	Hard	QF	6–4, 7–6^{(12–10)}	9
2013
24.	(Czech Republic) Petra Kvitová	8	Italian Open	Clay	3R	7–5, 2–6, 6–1	10
25.	(Poland) Agnieszka Radwańska	4	Southern California Open, US	Hard	QF	7–5, 2–6, 6–3	13
26.	(Belarus) Victoria Azarenka	3	Southern California Open, US	Hard	F	6–2, 6–3	13
2014
27.	(Slovakia) Dominika Cibulková	10	Madrid Open, Spain	Clay	1R	6–4, 6–0	19
28.	(Slovakia) Dominika Cibulková	10	French Open	Clay	3R	6–4, 6–4	18
29.	(Canada) Eugenie Bouchard	8	Connecticut Open, US	Hard	2R	6–2, 6–2	25
30.	(Denmark) Caroline Wozniacki	8	China Open	Hard	2R	6–4, 7–6^{(11–9)}	21
2016
31.	(Romania) Simona Halep	6	French Open	Clay	4R	7–6^{(7–0)}, 6–3	24
