= 2013 Southern California Open =

- Date: July 29 – August 4
- Edition: 33rd
- Category: WTA Premier
- Draw: 28S / 16D
- Prize money: $795,707
- Surface: Hard / outdoor
- Location: Carlsbad, California, United States

Champions

Singles
- (Australia) Samantha Stosur

Doubles
- (United States) Raquel Kops-Jones / (United States) Abigail Spears
- Southern California Open

The 2013 Southern California Open was a professional women's tennis tournament played on hard courts. It was the 4th edition of the tournament since its resumption in 2010, and a Premier tournament on the 2013 WTA Tour. It took place in Carlsbad, California, United States from July 29 to August 4, 2013. Fifth-seeded Samantha Stosur won the singles title.

== Finals ==
=== Singles ===
(Australia) Samantha Stosur defeated (Belarus) Victoria Azarenka, 6–2, 6–3

- It was Stosur's 1st singles title of the year and 4th of her career.

=== Doubles ===
(United States) Raquel Kops-Jones / (United States) Abigail Spears defeated (Chinese Taipei) Chan Hao-ching / (Slovakia) Janette Husárová, 6–4, 6–1

== Singles main-draw entrants ==
=== Seeds ===
Country	Player	Rank^{1}	Seed
BLR	Victoria Azarenka	3	1
POL	Agnieszka Radwańska	4	2
CZE	Petra Kvitová	7	3
ITA	Roberta Vinci	11	4
AUS	Samantha Stosur	13	5
SRB	Jelena Janković	16	6
SRB	Ana Ivanovic	17	7
ESP	Carla Suárez Navarro	19	8

- ^{1} Rankings are as of July 22, 2013

=== Other entrants ===
The following players received wildcards into the singles main:

- (United States) Allie Kiick
- (France) Virginie Razzano
- (Australia) Samantha Stosur

The following players received entry from the qualifying draw:

- (New Zealand) Marina Erakovic
- (Japan) Sachie Ishizu
- (Kazakhstan) Sesil Karatantcheva
- (United States) CoCo Vandeweghe

=== Withdrawals ===
Before the tournament

- (France) Marion Bartoli (hamstring injury)
- (Belgium) Kirsten Flipkens
- (Serbia) Bojana Jovanovski
- (France) Kristina Mladenovic
- (Russia) Anastasia Pavlyuchenkova

== Doubles main-draw entrants ==
=== Seeds ===
Country	Player	Country	Player	Rank^{1}	Seed
GER	Anna-Lena Grönefeld	CZE	Květa Peschke	25	1
USA	Liezel Huber	ESP	Nuria Llagostera Vives	40	2
USA	Raquel Kops-Jones	USA	Abigail Spears	44	3
SRB	Jelena Janković	SLO	Katarina Srebotnik	49	4

- ^{1} Rankings are as of July 22, 2013

=== Other entrants ===
The following pairs received wildcards into the doubles main draw:

- (Slovakia) Daniela Hantuchová / (Switzerland) Martina Hingis
- (Czech Republic) Petra Kvitová / (Austria) Tamira Paszek
