= 2005 Pacific Life Open – Men's singles =

Men's singles
- 2005 Pacific Life Open

Final
- Champion: (Switzerland) Roger Federer
- Runner-up: (Australia) Lleyton Hewitt
- Score: 6–2, 6–4, 6–4

Details
- Draw: 96
- Seeds: 32

Events
Singles	men	women
Doubles	men	women
- Indian Wells Masters

Defending champion Roger Federer defeated Lleyton Hewitt in the final, 6–2, 6–4, 6–4, to win the men's singles tennis title at the 2005 Indian Wells Masters. Federer did not lose a single set during the tournament.

== Seeds ==
All thirty-two seeds received a bye to the second round.

1. (Switzerland) Roger Federer (champion)
2. (Australia) Lleyton Hewitt (final)
3. (United States) Andy Roddick (semifinals)
4. (Russia) Marat Safin (third round)
5. (Argentina) Guillermo Coria (fourth round)
6. (United Kingdom) Tim Henman (quarterfinals)
7. (Spain) Carlos Moyá (quarterfinals)
8. (Argentina) Gastón Gaudio (third round)
9. (United States) Andre Agassi (quarterfinals, withdrew because of a toe injury)
10. (Argentina) David Nalbandian (fourth round)
11. (Sweden) Joachim Johansson (second round)
12. (Spain) Tommy Robredo (fourth round)
13. (Croatia) Ivan Ljubičić (fourth round)
14. (Argentina) Guillermo Cañas (semifinals)
15. (Russia) Nikolay Davydenko (second round)
16. (Germany) Tommy Haas (second round)
17. (Chile) Fernando González (fourth round)
18. (Russia) Mikhail Youzhny (second round)
19. (Croatia) Mario Ančić (second round)
20. (United States) Vincent Spadea (second round)
21. (Romania) Andrei Pavel (third round)
22. (Argentina) Juan Ignacio Chela (third round)
23. (Sweden) Thomas Johansson (second round)
24. (Spain) Feliciano López (third round)
25. (Czech Republic) Radek Štěpánek (second round)
26. (Czech Republic) Jiří Novák (third round)
27. (France) Sébastien Grosjean (second round)
28. (Slovakia) Dominik Hrbatý (second round)
29. (Germany) Nicolas Kiefer (quarterfinals)
30. (United States) Taylor Dent (fourth round, retired because of food poisoning)
31. (Thailand) Paradorn Srichaphan (third round)
32. (Austria) Jürgen Melzer (third round)

== Draw ==
Key

- Q = Qualifier
- WC = Wild card
- LL = Lucky loser
- Alt = Alternate
- ITF = ITF entry
- PR = Protected ranking
- SR = Special ranking
- SE = Special exempt
- JE = Junior exempt
- JR = Junior Accelerator Programme entrant
- CO = College Accelerator Programme entrant
- NG = Next Gen Accelerator Program entrant
- w/o = Walkover
- r = Retired
- d = Defaulted

=== Finals ===
Quarterfinals
1	(Switzerland) Roger Federer	6	6
29	(Germany) Nicolas Kiefer	4	1
14	(Argentina) Guillermo Cañas	7^{7}	7
6	(United Kingdom) Tim Henman	6^{1}	5
7	(Spain) Carlos Moyá	7^{7}	4	1
3	(United States) Andy Roddick	6^{4}	6	6
9	(United States) Andre Agassi
2	(Australia) Lleyton Hewitt	w/o

Semifinals
1	(Switzerland) Roger Federer	6	6
14	(Argentina) Guillermo Cañas	3	1
3	(United States) Andy Roddick	6^{2}	7^{7}	6^{4}
2	(Australia) Lleyton Hewitt	7^{7}	6^{3}	7^{7}

Final
1	(Switzerland) Roger Federer	6	6	6
2	(Australia) Lleyton Hewitt	2	4	4

=== Top half ===
==== Section 1 ====
First round
(United States) J-M Gambill	2	2
(United States) M Fish	6	6
Q	(Monaco) J-R Lisnard	4	5
(Luxembourg) G Müller	6	7
(Morocco) H Arazi	1	1
(Czech Republic) T Berdych	6	6
(Italy) F Volandri	1	4
Q	(Czech Republic) T Zíb	6	6

Second round
1	(Switzerland) R Federer	6	6
(United States) M Fish	3	3
(Luxembourg) G Müller	6	3	6
25	(Czech Republic) R Štěpánek	3	6	0
19	(Croatia) M Ančić	5	6	2
(Czech Republic) T Berdych	7	3	6
Q	(Czech Republic) T Zíb	3	2
13	(Croatia) I Ljubičić	6	6

Third round
1	(Switzerland) R Federer	6	6
(Luxembourg) G Müller	3	2
(Czech Republic) T Berdych	4	1
13	(Croatia) I Ljubičić	6	6

Fourth round
1	(Switzerland) R Federer	7^{7}	7^{7}
13	(Croatia) I Ljubičić	6^{3}	6^{4}

==== Section 2 ====
First round
(France) A Dupuis	2	2
(Argentina) J Mónaco	6	6
(Sweden) J Björkman	6	7^{7}
(Georgia (country)) I Labadze	1	6^{4}
(Armenia) S Sargsian	6	6
Q	(United States) B Reynolds	3	2
(Belarus) M Mirnyi	6	4	7^{7}
(Belgium) X Malisse	3	6	6^{4}

Second round
10	(Argentina) D Nalbandian	6	6
(Argentina) J Mónaco	2	1
(Sweden) J Björkman	4	6	7^{7}
23	(Sweden) T Johansson	6	3	6^{0}
29	(Germany) N Kiefer	6	6
(Armenia) S Sargsian	0	0
(Belarus) M Mirnyi	7^{7}	3	6^{4}
8	(Argentina) G Gaudio	6^{5}	6	7^{7}

Third round
10	(Argentina) D Nalbandian	6	3	6
(Sweden) J Björkman	1	6	1
29	(Germany) N Kiefer	6	6
8	(Argentina) G Gaudio	3	1

Fourth round
10	(Argentina) D Nalbandian	1	3
29	(Germany) N Kiefer	6	6

==== Section 3 ====
First round
(Finland) J Nieminen	6	7^{7}
(Peru) L Horna	0	6^{1}
(France) C Saulnier	6	6
(Romania) V Hănescu	2	2
WC	(United States) A Kuznetsov	4	3
(Germany) R Schüttler	6	6
(Germany) F Mayer	5	3
(Denmark) K Carlsen	7	6

Second round
4	(Russia) M Safin	4	6	7
(Finland) J Nieminen	6	1	5
(France) C Saulnier	6	6^{1}	2
30	(United States) T Dent	1	7^{7}	6
22	(Argentina) J I Chela	6^{4}	6	6
(Germany) R Schüttler	7^{7}	4	1
(Denmark) K Carlsen	4	3
14	(Argentina) G Cañas	6	6

Third round
4	(Russia) M Safin	5	4
30	(United States) T Dent	7	6
22	(Argentina) J I Chela	5	6	4
14	(Argentina) G Cañas	7	2	6

Fourth round
30	(United States) T Dent	3	r
14	(Argentina) G Cañas	6

==== Section 4 ====
First round
(United States) J Morrison	5	4
WC	(France) G Monfils	7	6
(Slovakia) K Beck	0	5
(Sweden) T Enqvist	6	7
Q	(United States) P Goldstein	6	7^{7}
(South Korea) H-T Lee	1	6^{1}
Q	(France) A Clément	6	6
WC	(United States) D Young	3	2

Second round
12	(Spain) T Robredo	6	6
WC	(France) G Monfils	3	1
(Sweden) T Enqvist	6	6
18	(Russia) M Youzhny	4	1
32	(Austria) J Melzer	7^{7}	3	6
Q	(United States) P Goldstein	6^{3}	6	3
Q	(France) A Clément	6	4	3
6	(United Kingdom) T Henman	4	6	6

Third round
12	(Spain) T Robredo	4	6	7^{7}
(Sweden) T Enqvist	6	2	6^{4}
32	(Austria) J Melzer	5	4
6	(United Kingdom) T Henman	7	6

Fourth round
12	(Spain) T Robredo	4	6	2
6	(United Kingdom) T Henman	6	2	6

=== Bottom half ===
==== Section 5 ====
First round
(Spain) J C Ferrero	6	6
(Russia) I Andreev	3	3
Q	(United States) B Vahaly	4	3
(Spain) D Ferrer	6	6
(Croatia) I Karlović	7^{7}	6
(France) J Benneteau	6^{2}	4
(France) F Santoro	6	6
(Brazil) R Mello	2	3

Second round
7	(Spain) C Moyá	6	6
(Spain) J C Ferrero	3	4
(Spain) D Ferrer	6	3	6
27	(France) S Grosjean	2	6	1
24	(Spain) F López	6^{4}	6	6
(Croatia) I Karlović	7^{7}	4	4
(France) F Santoro	4	6	7^{8}
11	(Sweden) J Johansson	6	2	6^{6}

Third round
7	(Spain) C Moyá	6	6
(Spain) D Ferrer	3	4
24	(Spain) F López	4	2
(France) F Santoro	6	6

Fourth round
7	(Spain) C Moyá	7	6
(France) F Santoro	5	2

==== Section 6 ====
First round
WC	(United States) J Blake	6	6
(Spain) A Martín	2	3
(United Kingdom) G Rusedski	3	7	6
Q	(United States) J Salzenstein	6	5	3
(Argentina) M Zabaleta	5	4
(Belgium) O Rochus	7	6
Q	(United States) W Odesnik	6^{0}	4
(Spain) F Verdasco	7^{7}	6

Second round
15	(Russia) N Davydenko	3	6^{6}
WC	(United States) J Blake	6	7^{8}
(United Kingdom) G Rusedski	6^{4}	6^{5}
17	(Chile) F González	7^{7}	7^{7}
26	(Czech Republic) J Novák	6	6
(Belgium) O Rochus	3	4
(Spain) F Verdasco	3	6	6^{2}
3	(United States) A Roddick	6	3	7^{7}

Third round
WC	(United States) J Blake	4	6	3
17	(Chile) F González	6	0	6
26	(Czech Republic) J Novák	1	2
3	(United States) A Roddick	6	6

Fourth round
17	(Chile) F González	4	3
3	(United States) A Roddick	6	6

==== Section 7 ====
First round
Q	(Ecuador) G Lapentti	5	1
(United States) K Kim	7	6
(Russia) D Tursunov	2	6	3
(Argentina) A Calleri	6	3	6
Q	(France) G Carraz	7^{9}	6
WC	(Australia) M Philippoussis	6^{7}	1
Q	(Australia) W Arthurs	6	6
(Italy) P Starace	4	3

Second round
5	(Argentina) G Coria	7^{7}	7^{7}
(United States) K Kim	6^{2}	6^{3}
(Argentina) A Calleri	5	4
31	(Thailand) P Srichaphan	7	6
21	(Romania) A Pavel	6^{5}	7^{8}	6
Q	(France) G Carraz	7^{7}	6^{6}	2
Q	(Australia) W Arthurs	4	1
9	(United States) A Agassi	6	6

Third round
5	(Argentina) G Coria	6	6
31	(Thailand) P Srichaphan	4	2
21	(Romania) A Pavel	3	4
9	(United States) A Agassi	6	6

Fourth round
5	(Argentina) G Coria	4	1
9	(United States) A Agassi	6	6

==== Section 8 ====
First round
(Spain) Á Calatrava	3	6	1
PR	(France) P-H Mathieu	6	3	6
Q	(Paraguay) R Delgado	2	4
(Czech Republic) J Hernych	6	6
(France) M Llodra	6	6
LL	(Italy) D Sanguinetti	3	2
(Argentina) J Acasuso	5	6^{5}
(United States) R Ginepri	7	7^{7}

Second round
16	(Germany) T Haas	6^{3}	3
PR	(France) P-H Mathieu	7^{7}	6
(Czech Republic) J Hernych	6	1	7^{8}
20	(United States) V Spadea	2	6	6^{6}
28	(Slovakia) D Hrbatý	6	1	2
(France) M Llodra	4	6	6
(United States) R Ginepri	2	6^{2}
2	(Australia) L Hewitt	6	7^{7}

Third round
PR	(France) P-H Mathieu	6	4	7^{8}
(Czech Republic) J Hernych	4	6	6^{6}
(France) M Llodra	2	6^{3}
2	(Australia) L Hewitt	6	7^{7}

Fourth round
PR	(France) P-H Mathieu	1	0
2	(Australia) L Hewitt	6	6
