= 2005 Pacific Life Open =

- Date: March 14–20
- Edition: 32nd
- Category: Masters Series (ATP); Tier I Series (WTA)
- Prize money: $2,724,600
- Surface: Hard / outdoor
- Location: Indian Wells, California, US
- Venue: Indian Wells Tennis Garden

Champions

Men's singles
- (Switzerland) Roger Federer

Women's singles
- (Belgium) Kim Clijsters

Men's doubles
- (The Bahamas) Mark Knowles / (Canada) Daniel Nestor

Women's doubles
- (Spain) Virginia Ruano Pascual / (Argentina) Paola Suárez
← 2004 ·	Indian Wells Open	· 2006 →

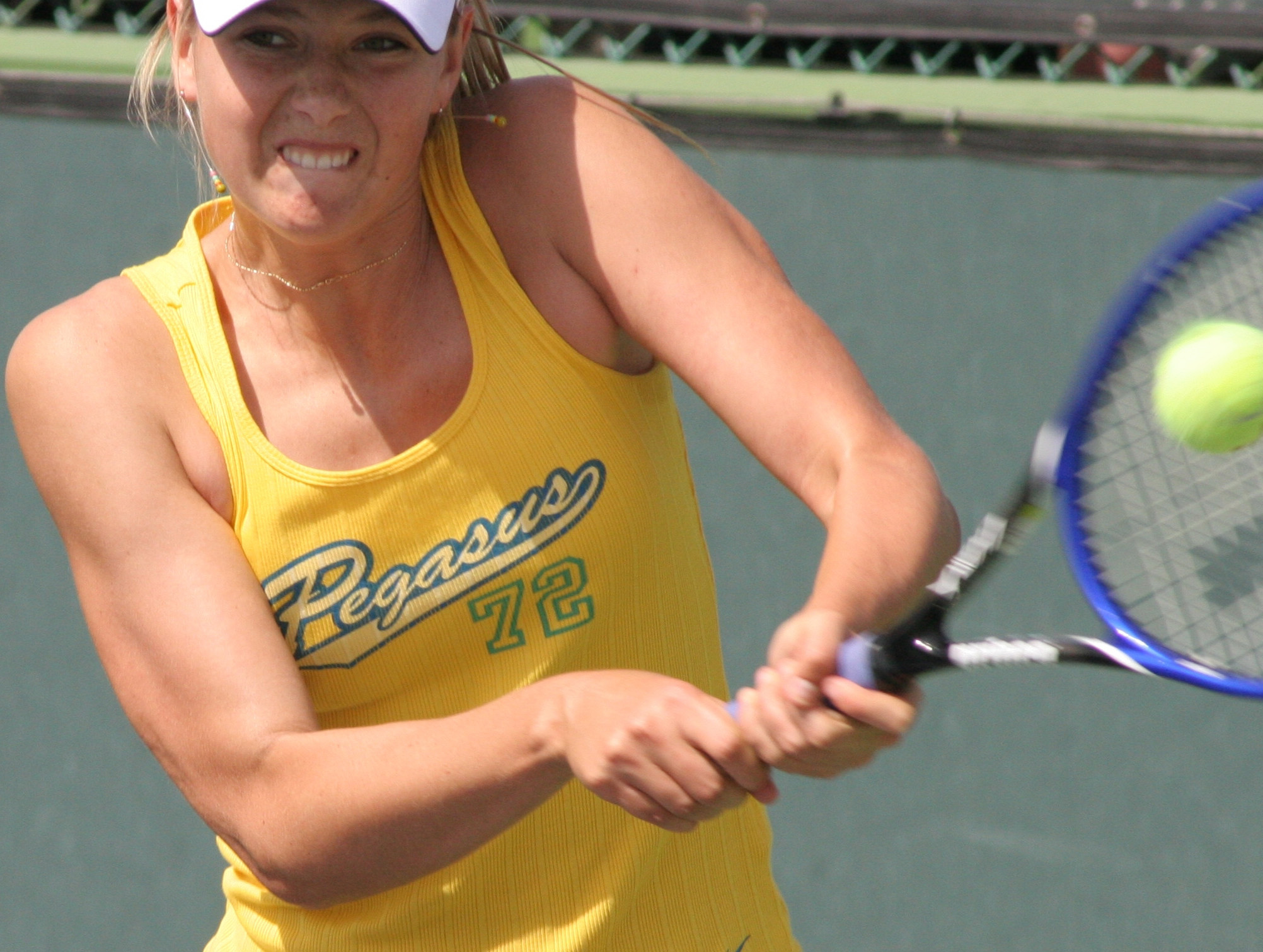
Maria Sharapova in action at Indian Wells. She suffered her worst ever defeat in her professional career in the semi-finals, losing to Lindsay Davenport without winning a single game.

The 2005 Indian Wells Open (also known as the Pacific Life Open for sponsorship reasons) was a tennis tournament played on outdoor hard courts. It was the 32nd edition of the Indian Wells Open, and was part of the ATP Masters Series of the 2005 ATP Tour, and of the Tier I Series of the 2005 WTA Tour. Both the men's and the women's events took place at the Indian Wells Tennis Garden in Indian Wells, California, United States, from March 14 through March 20, 2005.

The men singles were headlined by World No. 1, reigning Wimbledon and US Open champion, and Masters Cup winner and defending champion Roger Federer, ATP No. 2, Sydney champion, two-times Grand Slam champion and Australian Open runner-up Lleyton Hewitt, and San Jose champion and two-time grand-slam finalist Andy Roddick. Also competing in the field were Australian Open titlist Marat Safin, 2004 French Open winner Gastón Gaudio, Tim Henman, Carlos Moyá and Guillermo Coria.

The women's draw featured WTA No. 1, Australian Open runner-up and 2000 Indian Wells winner Lindsay Davenport, Antwerp champion, Olympic silver medalist Amélie Mauresmo and Tokyo, Qatar titlist, 2004 Wimbledon winner Maria Sharapova. Other top seeds were French Open, US Open runner-up Elena Dementieva, U.S Open winner Svetlana Kuznetsova, Nadia Petrova, Nathalie Dechy and Elena Bovina.

== Finals ==
=== Men's singles ===
(Switzerland) Roger Federer defeated (Australia) Lleyton Hewitt, 6–2, 6–4, 6–4

- It was Federer's 4th title of the year, and his 26th overall. It was his 1st Masters title of the year, and his 5th overall. This was also his second victory at the event after winning the previous year.

=== Women's singles ===
(Belgium) Kim Clijsters defeated (United States) Lindsay Davenport, 6–4, 4–6, 6–2

- It was Clijsters' 1st title of the year, and her 22nd overall. It was her 3rd Tier I title overall. This was also her second victory at the event after winning in 2003.

=== Men's doubles ===
(The Bahamas) Mark Knowles / (Canada) Daniel Nestor defeated (Australia) Wayne Arthurs / (Australia) Paul Hanley, 7–6^{(8–6)}, 7–6^{(7–2)}

=== Women's doubles ===
(Spain) Virginia Ruano Pascual / (Argentina) Paola Suárez defeated (Russia) Nadia Petrova / (United States) Meghann Shaughnessy, 7–6^{(7–3)}, 6–1
