= 2006 Pacific Life Open – Men's singles =

Men's singles
- 2006 Pacific Life Open

Final
- Champion: (Switzerland) Roger Federer
- Runner-up: (United States) James Blake
- Score: 7–5, 6–3, 6–0

Details
- Draw: 96 (5WC/12Q)
- Seeds: 32

Events
Singles	men	women
Doubles	men	women
- Indian Wells Masters

Two-time defending champion Roger Federer defeated James Blake in the final, 7–5, 6–3, 6–0 to win the men's singles tennis title at the 2006 Indian Wells Masters.

== Seeds ==
All seeds receive a bye into the second round.

1. (Switzerland) Roger Federer (champion)
2. (Spain) Rafael Nadal (semifinals)
3. (United States) Andy Roddick (fourth round)
4. (Argentina) David Nalbandian (fourth round)
5. (Russia) Nikolay Davydenko (third round)
6. (Croatia) Ivan Ljubičić (quarterfinals)
7. (Argentina) Gastón Gaudio (third round)
8. (United States) Andre Agassi (third round)
9. (Australia) Lleyton Hewitt (third round)
10. (Spain) David Ferrer (second round)
11. (Germany) Nicolas Kiefer (second round)
12. (United States) James Blake (final)
13. (Chile) Fernando González (second round)
14. (Spain) Juan Carlos Ferrero (third round)
15. (Czech Republic) Radek Štěpánek (second round)
16. (France) Richard Gasquet (fourth round)
17. (Spain) Tommy Robredo (third round)
18. (United States) Robby Ginepri (second round)
19. (Slovakia) Dominik Hrbatý (third round)
20. (France) Sébastien Grosjean (fourth round)
21. (Croatia) Mario Ančić (fourth round)
22. (Finland) Jarkko Nieminen (quarterfinals)
23. (Czech Republic) Tomáš Berdych (fourth round)
24. (Russia) Igor Andreev (quarterfinals)
25. (Cyprus) Marcos Baghdatis (quarterfinals)
26. (Germany) Tommy Haas (fourth round)
27. (France) Gaël Monfils (third round)
28. (Spain) Carlos Moyà (second round)
29. (Argentina) Juan Ignacio Chela (second round)
30. (Belgium) Olivier Rochus (third round)
31. (Italy) Filippo Volandri (second round)
32. (Spain) Fernando Verdasco (third round)

== Draw ==
Key

- Q = Qualifier
- WC = Wild card
- LL = Lucky loser
- Alt = Alternate
- ITF = ITF entry
- PR = Protected ranking
- SR = Special ranking
- SE = Special exempt
- JE = Junior exempt
- JR = Junior Accelerator Programme entrant
- CO = College Accelerator Programme entrant
- NG = Next Gen Accelerator Program entrant
- w/o = Walkover
- r = Retired
- d = Defaulted

=== Finals ===
Quarterfinals
1	(Switzerland) Roger Federer	6	6
6	(Croatia) Ivan Ljubičić	2	3
(Thailand) Paradorn Srichaphan	7^{7}	3	7
22	(Finland) Jarkko Nieminen	6^{3}	6	5
12	(United States) James Blake	6	6
24	(Russia) Igor Andreev	1	4
25	(Cyprus) Marcos Baghdatis	5	0
2	(Spain) Rafael Nadal	7	6

Semifinals
1	(Switzerland) Roger Federer	6	6
(Thailand) Paradorn Srichaphan	2	3
12	(United States) James Blake	7	6
2	(Spain) Rafael Nadal	5	3

Finals
1	(Switzerland) Roger Federer	7	6	6
12	(United States) James Blake	5	3	0

=== Top half ===
==== Section 1 ====
First round
(Argentina) A Calleri	1	7	6^{10}
(Chile) N Massú	6	5	7^{12}
(United Kingdom) G Rusedski	2	4
(Switzerland) S Wawrinka	6	6
(Peru) L Horna	3	3
(Italy) D Bracciali	6	6
Q	(United States) K Kim	7	6
(Russia) M Youzhny	5	4

Second round
1	(Switzerland) R Federer	6	7^{7}
(Chile) N Massú	3	6^{4}
(Switzerland) S Wawrinka	6^{4}	5
30	(Belgium) O Rochus	7^{7}	7
19	(Slovakia) D Hrbatý	7	7
(Italy) D Bracciali	5	5
Q	(United States) K Kim	4	3
16	(France) R Gasquet	6	6

Third round
1	(Switzerland) R Federer	3	6	7
30	(Belgium) O Rochus	6	2	5
19	(Slovakia) D Hrbatý	3	4
16	(France) R Gasquet	6	6

Fourth round
1	(Switzerland) R Federer	6	6
16	(France) R Gasquet	3	4

==== Section 2 ====
First round
(Italy) A Seppi	6	4	1
(France) P-H Mathieu	2	6	6
Q	(Chile) P Capdeville	7^{7}	2	3
(Italy) D Sanguinetti	6^{5}	6	6
(Romania) A Pavel	7^{7}	5	3
Q	(United States) J Morrison	6^{5}	7	6
Q	(Serbia and Montenegro) J Tipsarević	6	7^{7}
WC	(United States) S Warburg	4	6^{4}

Second round
11	(Germany) N Kiefer	6^{5}	6	2
(France) P-H Mathieu	7^{7}	4	6
(Italy) D Sanguinetti	3	6^{3}
21	(Croatia) M Ančić	6	7^{7}
27	(France) G Monfils	6	0	6
Q	(United States) J Morrison	3	6	3
Q	(Serbia and Montenegro) J Tipsarević	1	4
6	(Croatia) I Ljubičić	6	6

Third round
(France) P-H Mathieu	6^{5}	3
21	(Croatia) M Ančić	7^{7}	6
27	(France) G Monfils	3	2
6	(Croatia) I Ljubičić	6	6

Fourth round
21	(Croatia) M Ančić	3	4
6	(Croatia) I Ljubičić	6	6

==== Section 3 ====
First round
Q	(United States) J Gimelstob	7	6
(Spain) F López	5	3
Q	(France) J Benneteau	6	6
(Serbia and Montenegro) N Djokovic	3	4
(South Africa) W Moodie	6^{2}	4
(Thailand) P Srichaphan	7^{7}	6
(United States) V Spadea	6	4
(Argentina) C Berlocq	1	1^{r}

Second round
4	(Argentina) D Nalbandian	6	6
Q	(United States) J Gimelstob	4	4
Q	(France) J Benneteau	6	4	6
29	(Argentina) JI Chela	4	6	3
18	(United States) R Ginepri	6^{10}	3
(Thailand) P Srichaphan	7^{12}	6
(United States) V Spadea	2	6	6^{4}
14	(Spain) JC Ferrero	6	4	7^{7}

Third round
4	(Argentina) D Nalbandian	6	6
Q	(France) J Benneteau	4	1
(Thailand) P Srichaphan	6	6
14	(Spain) JC Ferrero	2	2

Fourth round
4	(Argentina) D Nalbandian	7^{7}	3	2
(Thailand) P Srichaphan	6^{5}	6	6

==== Section 4 ====
First round
(Germany) P Kohlschreiber	3	6	6
(France) F Serra	6	4	3
(Germany) F Mayer	6	6
WC	(Australia) M Philippoussis	4	3
Q	(United States) A Delić	3	4
(Russia) M Safin	6	6
Q	(Greece) V Mazarakis	2	1
(United Kingdom) A Murray	6	6

Second round
10	(Spain) D Ferrer	6	4	3
(Germany) P Kohlschreiber	3	6	6
(Germany) F Mayer	4	4
22	(Finland) J Nieminen	6	6
28	(Spain) C Moyà	7^{7}	3	4
(Russia) M Safin	6^{4}	6	6
(United Kingdom) A Murray	1	6	3
5	(Russia) N Davydenko	6	3	6

Third round
(Germany) P Kohlschreiber	1	6	3
22	(Finland) J Nieminen	6	3	6
(Russia) M Safin	7^{7}	3	6
5	(Russia) N Davydenko	6^{5}	6	4

Fourth round
22	(Finland) J Nieminen	6	6
(Russia) M Safin	4	3

=== Bottom half ===
==== Section 5 ====
First round
(United States) P Goldstein	3	6	6
(Spain) A Martín	6	1	1
Q	(United States) G Weiner	3	2
(France) A Clément	6	6
(Denmark) K Carlsen	6	4	6
(Luxembourg) G Müller	3	6	3
WC	(United States) S Querrey	6	7
(United States) B Reynolds	3	5

Second round
8	(United States) A Agassi	6	4	6
(United States) P Goldstein	4	6	2
(France) A Clément	3	6	4
26	(Germany) T Haas	6	1	6
17	(Spain) T Robredo	6	6
(Denmark) K Carlsen	1	3
WC	(United States) S Querrey	6	1	3
12	(United States) J Blake	1	6	6

Third round
8	(United States) A Agassi	5	2
26	(Germany) T Haas	7	6
17	(Spain) T Robredo	2	5
12	(United States) J Blake	6	7

Fourth round
26	(Germany) T Haas	3	0^{r}
12	(United States) J Blake	6	3

==== Section 6 ====
First round
(Sweden) R Söderling	6	6
(Austria) J Melzer	4	4
(Russia) D Tursunov	6	6
(Germany) T Behrend	4	2
(Croatia) I Karlović	7^{11}	6
(Czech Republic) T Zíb	6^{9}	4
Q	(United States) J Salzenstein	7^{7}	3	1
(Argentina) J Acasuso	6^{2}	6	6

Second round
13	(Chile) F González	4	0
(Sweden) R Söderling	6	6
(Russia) D Tursunov	7^{7}	1	2
24	(Russia) I Andreev	6^{2}	6	6
32	(Spain) F Verdasco	6	3	7^{7}
(Croatia) I Karlović	3	6	6^{5}
(Argentina) J Acasuso	6^{5}	0
3	(United States) A Roddick	7^{7}	6

Third round
(Sweden) R Söderling	6	6^{14}	4
24	(Russia) I Andreev	3	7^{16}	6
32	(Spain) F Verdasco	3	4
3	(United States) A Roddick	6	6

Fourth round
24	(Russia) I Andreev	6	6^{5}	6
3	(United States) A Roddick	4	7^{7}	1

==== Section 7 ====
First round
(Belarus) M Mirnyi	4	6^{5}
(France) C Saulnier	6	7^{7}
(Sweden) J Björkman	6	3	6
(Germany) C Rochus	2	6	2
WC	(United States) D Young	3	1
(United Kingdom) T Henman	6	6
(Serbia and Montenegro) B Pašanski	6^{4}	5
(Germany) R Schüttler	7^{7}	7

Second round
7	(Argentina) G Gaudio	3	6	6
(France) C Saulnier	6	3	4
(Sweden) J Björkman	4	3
25	(Cyprus) M Baghdatis	6	6
23	(Czech Republic) T Berdych	6	6
(United Kingdom) T Henman	4	4
(Germany) R Schüttler	6^{3}	6	4
9	(Australia) L Hewitt	7^{7}	2	6

Third round
7	(Argentina) G Gaudio	7^{7}	3	2
25	(Cyprus) M Baghdatis	6^{5}	6	6
23	(Czech Republic) T Berdych	7	6
9	(Australia) L Hewitt	5	3

Fourth round
25	(Cyprus) M Baghdatis	6	6
23	(Czech Republic) T Berdych	4	1

==== Section 8 ====
First round
(Belgium) X Malisse	6	4	6
(France) F Santoro	1	6	4
(Belgium) K Vliegen	6	4	6
Q	(Germany) L Burgsmüller	4	6	4
Q	(Ecuador) G Lapentti	7	3	3
WC	(United States) M Fish	5	6	6
(Czech Republic) R Vik	1	4
(Czech Republic) J Hernych	6	6

Second round
15	(Czech Republic) R Štěpánek	1	1
(Belgium) X Malisse	6	6
(Belgium) K Vliegen	1	3
20	(France) S Grosjean	6	6
31	(Italy) F Volandri	3	2
WC	(United States) M Fish	6	6
(Czech Republic) J Hernych	4	4
2	(Spain) R Nadal	6	6

Third round
(Belgium) X Malisse	4	7^{12}	2
20	(France) S Grosjean	6	6^{10}	6
WC	(United States) M Fish	1	4
2	(Spain) R Nadal	6	6

Fourth round
20	(France) S Grosjean	4	2
2	(Spain) R Nadal	6	6
