= 2005 Pacific Life Open – Men's doubles =

Men's doubles
- 2005 Pacific Life Open

Final
- Champions: (The Bahamas) Mark Knowles (Canada) Daniel Nestor
- Runners-up: (Australia) Wayne Arthurs (Australia) Paul Hanley
- Score: 7–6^{(8–6)}, 7–6^{(7–2)}

Events
Singles	men	women
Doubles	men	women
← 2004 ·	Pacific Life Open	· 2006 →

Arnaud Clément and Sébastien Grosjean were the defending champions, but did not partner together this year. Clément partnered Jaroslav Levinský, losing in the first round. Grosjean partnered Gaël Monfils, losing in the second round.

Mark Knowles and Daniel Nestor won the title, defeating Wayne Arthurs and Paul Hanley 7–6^{(8–6)}, 7–6^{(7–2)} in the final.

== Seeds ==
1. (The Bahamas) Mark Knowles / (Canada) Daniel Nestor (champions)
2. (Zimbabwe) Wayne Black / (Zimbabwe) Kevin Ullyett (quarterfinals)
3. (Sweden) Jonas Björkman / (Belarus) Max Mirnyi (semifinals)
4. (United States) Bob Bryan / (United States) Mike Bryan (semifinals)
5. (India) Mahesh Bhupathi / (Australia) Todd Woodbridge (first round)
6. (India) Leander Paes / (Serbia and Montenegro) Nenad Zimonjić (quarterfinals)
7. (Australia) Wayne Arthurs / (Australia) Paul Hanley (final)
8. (France) Michaël Llodra / (France) Fabrice Santoro (second round)

== Draw ==
=== Key ===
- Q = Qualifier
- WC = Wild card
- LL = Lucky loser
- Alt = Alternate
- SE = Special exempt
- PR = Protected ranking
- ITF = ITF entry
- JE = Junior exempt
- w/o = Walkover
- r = Retired
- d = Defaulted
- SR = Special ranking

=== Finals ===
Semifinals
1	(The Bahamas) Mark Knowles (Canada) Daniel Nestor	6^{8}	6	6
3	(Sweden) Jonas Björkman (Belarus) Max Mirnyi	7^{10}	3	4
4	(United States) Bob Bryan (United States) Mike Bryan	7^{8}	3	6^{4}
7	(Australia) Wayne Arthurs (Australia) Paul Hanley	6^{6}	6	7^{7}

Final
1	(The Bahamas) Mark Knowles (Canada) Daniel Nestor	7^{8}	7^{7}
7	(Australia) Wayne Arthurs (Australia) Paul Hanley	6^{6}	6^{2}

=== Top half ===
First round
1	(The Bahamas) M Knowles (Canada) D Nestor	6	6
(Croatia) M Ančić (Croatia) I Ljubičić	2	2
(Germany) N Kiefer (Czech Republic) R Štěpánek	4	4
WC	(France) S Grosjean (France) G Monfils	6	6
(Russia) N Davydenko (Slovakia) D Hrbatý	1	4
(Belgium) X Malisse (Belgium) O Rochus	6	6
(Austria) J Knowle (Czech Republic) P Pála	2	6	4
6	(India) L Paes (Serbia and Montenegro) N Zimonjić	6	2	6
3	(Sweden) J Björkman (Belarus) M Mirnyi	7	6
(Czech Republic) J Novák (United States) J Palmer	5	3
(Czech Republic) C Suk (Czech Republic) P Vízner	6	6
(Sweden) T Johansson (Russia) M Safin	4	2
(Chile) F González (Austria) J Melzer	4	4
(Argentina) G Etlis (Argentina) M Rodríguez	6	6
(Argentina) G Cañas (Argentina) JI Chela	6	6^{5}	3
8	(France) M Llodra (France) F Santoro	0	7^{7}	6

Second round
1	(The Bahamas) M Knowles (Canada) D Nestor	6	6
WC	(France) S Grosjean (France) G Monfils	4	1
(Belgium) X Malisse (Belgium) O Rochus	2	6^{5}
6	(India) L Paes (Serbia and Montenegro) N Zimonjić	6	7^{7}
3	(Sweden) J Björkman (Belarus) M Mirnyi	6	6
(Czech Republic) C Suk (Czech Republic) P Vízner	1	2
(Argentina) G Etlis (Argentina) M Rodríguez	1	7	7^{7}
8	(France) M Llodra (France) F Santoro	6	5	6^{2}

Quarterfinals
1	(The Bahamas) M Knowles (Canada) D Nestor	6	4	6
6	(India) L Paes (Serbia and Montenegro) N Zimonjić	3	6	2
3	(Sweden) J Björkman (Belarus) M Mirnyi	6	3	6
(Argentina) G Etlis (Argentina) M Rodríguez	3	6	2

Semifinals
1	(The Bahamas) M Knowles (Canada) D Nestor	6^{8}	6	6
3	(Sweden) J Björkman (Belarus) M Mirnyi	7^{10}	3	4

=== Bottom half ===
First round
5	(India) M Bhupathi (Australia) T Woodbridge	6	3	6^{4}
(Switzerland) Y Allegro (Germany) M Kohlmann	1	6	7^{7}
(Romania) A Pavel (Argentina) S Prieto	2	4
(Australia) J Kerr (United States) G Oliver	6	6
(Argentina) L Arnold (Argentina) M García	4	4
(Czech Republic) F Čermák (Czech Republic) L Friedl	6	6
(Sweden) S Aspelin (Australia) T Perry	5	2
4	(United States) B Bryan (United States) M Bryan	7	6
7	(Australia) W Arthurs (Australia) P Hanley	6	7^{7}
(Germany) R Schüttler (Russia) M Youzhny	4	6^{4}
(France) A Clément (Czech Republic) J Levinský	6	6^{0}	2
WC	(United States) J Blake (United States) M Fish	3	7^{7}	6
(Israel) J Erlich (Israel) A Ram	7	6
(France) J Benneteau (Spain) F López	5	3
(United States) V Spadea (Italy) F Volandri	5	2
2	(Zimbabwe) W Black (Zimbabwe) K Ullyett	7	6

Second round
(Switzerland) Y Allegro (Germany) M Kohlmann	6	6
(Australia) J Kerr (United States) G Oliver	4	3
(Czech Republic) F Čermák (Czech Republic) L Friedl	2	3
4	(United States) B Bryan (United States) M Bryan	6	6
7	(Australia) W Arthurs (Australia) P Hanley	2	6	6
WC	(United States) J Blake (United States) M Fish	6	4	3
(Israel) J Erlich (Israel) A Ram	6	6^{2}	2
2	(Zimbabwe) W Black (Zimbabwe) K Ullyett	2	7^{7}	6

Quarterfinals
(Switzerland) Y Allegro (Germany) M Kohlmann	3	4
4	(United States) B Bryan (United States) M Bryan	6	6
7	(Australia) W Arthurs (Australia) P Hanley	6	4	7^{7}
2	(Zimbabwe) W Black (Zimbabwe) K Ullyett	4	6	6^{5}

Semifinals
4	(United States) B Bryan (United States) M Bryan	7^{8}	3	6^{4}
7	(Australia) W Arthurs (Australia) P Hanley	6^{6}	6	7^{7}
