= 2006 Pacific Life Open – Men's doubles =

Men's doubles
- 2006 Pacific Life Open

Final
- Champions: (The Bahamas) Mark Knowles (Canada) Daniel Nestor
- Runners-up: (United States) Bob Bryan (United States) Mike Bryan
- Score: 6–4, 6–4

Details
- Draw: 32 (2WC)
- Seeds: 8

Events
Singles	men	women
Doubles	men	women
← 2005 ·	Indian Wells Masters	· 2007 →

The 2006 Pacific Life Open men's doubles was an event of the 2006 Pacific Life Open men's tennis tournament played in Indian Wells, USA from March 6 through March 19, 2006.

Mark Knowles and Daniel Nestor were the defending champions, and won again, defeating Bob Bryan and Mike Bryan in the final 6–4, 6–4.

== Seeds ==
1. (United States) Bob Bryan / (United States) Mike Bryan (final)
2. (Sweden) Jonas Björkman / (Belarus) Max Mirnyi (semifinals)
3. (The Bahamas) Mark Knowles / (Canada) Daniel Nestor (champions)
4. (Australia) Paul Hanley / (Zimbabwe) Kevin Ullyett (first round)
5. (Czech Republic) Martin Damm / (India) Leander Paes (second round)
6. (France) Fabrice Santoro / (Serbia and Montenegro) Nenad Zimonjić (quarterfinals)
7. (Israel) Jonathan Erlich / (Israel) Andy Ram (first round)
8. (Czech Republic) František Čermák / (Czech Republic) Leoš Friedl (second round)

== Draw ==
=== Key ===
- Q = Qualifier
- WC = Wild card
- LL = Lucky loser
- Alt = Alternate
- SE = Special exempt
- PR = Protected ranking
- ITF = ITF entry
- JE = Junior exempt
- w/o = Walkover
- r = Retired
- d = Defaulted
- SR = Special ranking

=== Finals ===
Semifinals
1	(United States) Bob Bryan (United States) Mike Bryan	7	6
(Sweden) Simon Aspelin (Australia) Todd Perry	5	2
3	(The Bahamas) Mark Knowles (Canada) Daniel Nestor	7^{7}	6
2	(Sweden) Jonas Björkman (Belarus) Max Mirnyi	6^{5}	1

Final
1	(United States) Bob Bryan (United States) Mike Bryan	4	4
3	(The Bahamas) Mark Knowles (Canada) Daniel Nestor	6	6

=== Top half ===
First round
1	(United States) B Bryan (United States) M Bryan	4	6	[10]
(India) M Bhupathi (South Africa) W Moodie	6	3	[4]
(Chile) F González (Chile) N Massú	3	6	[7]
(Czech Republic) T Berdych (Czech Republic) J Levinský	6	2	[10]
(France) R Gasquet (France) S Grosjean	7^{7}	7
(Switzerland) Y Allegro (Switzerland) R Federer	6^{4}	5
(Spain) R Nadal (Russia) M Youzhny	3	6	[10]
7	(Israel) J Erlich (Israel) A Ram	6	4	[7]
4	(Australia) P Hanley (Zimbabwe) K Ullyett	4	6	[7]
(Poland) M Fyrstenberg (Poland) M Matkowski	6	4	[10]
(Argentina) A Calleri (Argentina) D Nalbandian	4	2
(Sweden) S Aspelin (Australia) T Perry	6	6
(France) P-H Mathieu (France) G Monfils	0	2
(Austria) J Knowle (Austria) J Melzer	6	6
(Croatia) M Ančić (Croatia) I Ljubičić	7	4	[11]
8	(Czech Republic) F Čermák (Czech Republic) L Friedl	6	6	[13]

Second round
1	(United States) B Bryan (United States) M Bryan	6	6
(Czech Republic) T Berdych (Czech Republic) J Levinský	1	0
(France) R Gasquet (France) S Grosjean	w/o
(Spain) R Nadal (Russia) M Youzhny
(Poland) M Fyrstenberg (Poland) M Matkowski	4	6	[7]
(Sweden) S Aspelin (Australia) T Perry	6	3	[10]
(Austria) J Knowle (Austria) J Melzer	6^{4}	7^{7}	[10]
8	(Czech Republic) F Čermák (Czech Republic) L Friedl	7^{7}	6^{1}	[7]

Quarterfinals
1	(United States) B Bryan (United States) M Bryan	6	6
(France) R Gasquet (France) S Grosjean	3	2
(Sweden) S Aspelin (Australia) T Perry	6	6
(Austria) J Knowle (Austria) J Melzer	3	1

Semifinals
1	(United States) B Bryan (United States) M Bryan	7	6
(Sweden) S Aspelin (Australia) T Perry	5	2

=== Bottom half ===
First round
5	(Czech Republic) M Damm (India) L Paes	7^{8}	6
(United States) R Ginepri (South Africa) C Haggard	6^{6}	3
(Russia) I Andreev (Russia) N Davydenko	6	6
(Spain) D Ferrer (Spain) T Robredo	1	4
(Russia) M Safin (Switzerland) S Wawrinka	3	6	[5]
WC	(United States) P Goldstein (United States) J Thomas	6	2	[10]
(Czech Republic) C Suk (Czech Republic) P Vízner	4	4
3	(The Bahamas) M Knowles (Canada) D Nestor	6	6
6	(France) F Santoro (Serbia and Montenegro) N Zimonjić	4	7^{7}	[10]
(Sweden) R Lindstedt (Finland) J Nieminen	6	6^{4}	[4]
(Argentina) G Etlis (Argentina) G Gaudio	6	6
(Slovakia) D Hrbatý (Czech Republic) R Štěpánek	2	2
WC	(United States) J Gimelstob (Australia) S Huss	2	6	[10]
(Cyprus) M Baghdatis (Italy) F Volandri	6	2	[4]
(Argentina) J Acasuso (Argentina) S Prieto	7^{7}	6^{0}	[3]
2	(Sweden) J Björkman (Belarus) M Mirnyi	6^{2}	7^{7}	[10]

Second round
5	(Czech Republic) M Damm (India) L Paes	6	3	[8]
(Russia) I Andreev (Russia) N Davydenko	1	6	[10]
WC	(United States) P Goldstein (United States) J Thomas	5	6	[13]
3	(The Bahamas) M Knowles (Canada) D Nestor	7	4	[15]
6	(France) F Santoro (Serbia and Montenegro) N Zimonjić	7	6
(Argentina) G Etlis (Argentina) G Gaudio	5	3
WC	(United States) J Gimelstob (Australia) S Huss	5	1
2	(Sweden) J Björkman (Belarus) M Mirnyi	7	6

Quarterfinals
(Russia) I Andreev (Russia) N Davydenko	3	6	[8]
3	(The Bahamas) M Knowles (Canada) D Nestor	6	1	[10]
6	(France) F Santoro (Serbia and Montenegro) N Zimonjić	6	6^{5}	[5]
2	(Sweden) J Björkman (Belarus) M Mirnyi	4	7^{7}	[10]

Semifinals
3	(The Bahamas) M Knowles (Canada) D Nestor	7^{7}	6
2	(Sweden) J Björkman (Belarus) M Mirnyi	6^{5}	1
