= 2009 Rogers Cup – Women's singles =

Women's singles
- 2009 Rogers Cup

Final
- Champion: (Russia) Elena Dementieva
- Runner-up: (Russia) Maria Sharapova
- Score: 6–4, 6–3

Details
- Draw: 56
- Seeds: 16

Events
| Singles | men | women |
| Doubles | men | women |
- Rogers Cup

Elena Dementieva defeated Maria Sharapova in the final, 6–4, 6–3 to win the women's singles tennis title at the 2009 Canadian Open.

Dinara Safina was the defending champion, but lost in the second round to Aravane Rezaï.

== Seeds ==
The top eight seeds receive a bye into the second round.

1. (Russia) Dinara Safina (second round)
2. (United States) Serena Williams (semifinals)
3. (United States) Venus Williams (second round)
4. (Russia) Elena Dementieva (champion)
5. (Serbia) Jelena Janković (quarterfinals)
6. (Russia) Svetlana Kuznetsova (second round)
7. (Russia) Vera Zvonareva (third round)
8. (Denmark) Caroline Wozniacki (second round)
9. (Belarus) Victoria Azarenka (second round)
10. (Russia) Nadia Petrova (first round)
11. (Serbia) Ana Ivanovic (second round)
12. (Italy) Flavia Pennetta (second round)
13. (France) Marion Bartoli (first round)
14. (Poland) Agnieszka Radwańska (quarterfinals)
15. (France) Amélie Mauresmo (first round)
16. (Slovakia) Dominika Cibulková (second round)

== Main draw ==
Key

- Q = Qualifier
- WC = Wild card
- LL = Lucky loser
- Alt = Alternate
- ITF = ITF entry
- PR = Protected ranking
- SR = Special ranking
- SE = Special exempt
- JE = Junior exempt
- JR = Junior Accelerator Programme entrant
- CO = College Accelerator Programme entrant
- NG = Next Gen Accelerator Program entrant
- w/o = Walkover
- r = Retired
- d = Defaulted

=== Finals ===
Quarterfinals
(Russia) Alisa Kleybanova | 6^{6} | 7 | 6
5 | (Serbia) Jelena Janković | 7 | 6^{7} | 2
14 | (Poland) Agnieszka Radwańska | 2 | 6^{5}
(Russia) Maria Sharapova | 6 | 7
(Australia) Samantha Stosur | 7 | 1 | 3
4 | (Russia) Elena Dementieva | 6^{3} | 6 | 6
Q | (Czech Republic) Lucie Šafářová | 3 | 2
2 | (United States) Serena Williams | 6 | 6

Semifinals
(Russia) Alisa Kleybanova | 2 | 6 | 4
(Russia) Maria Sharapova | 6 | 4 | 6
4 | (Russia) Elena Dementieva | 7 | 6
2 | (United States) Serena Williams | 6^{2} | 1

Final
(Russia) Maria Sharapova | 4 | 3
4 | (Russia) Elena Dementieva | 6 | 6

=== Top half ===
==== Section 1 ====
First round
(France) A Cornet | 4 | 5
(France) A Rezaï | 6 | 7
(Russia) A Kleybanova | 6 | 6
(Canada) A Wozniak | 4 | 4
(Italy) S Errani | 4 | 2
16 | (Slovakia) D Cibulková | 6 | 6
9 | (Belarus) V Azarenka | 6 | 6
(China) S Peng | 3 | 3
Q | (United Kingdom) E Baltacha | 3 | 4
WC | (Belgium) K Clijsters | 6 | 6
(Spain) A Medina Garrigues | 2 | 1
(Switzerland) P Schnyder | 6 | 6

Second round
1 | (Russia) D Safina | 6 | 2 | 4
(France) A Rezaï | 3 | 6 | 6
(Russia) A Kleybanova | 6 | 4 | 7
16 | (Slovakia) D Cibulková | 1 | 6 | 6^{4}
9 | (Belarus) V Azarenka | 5 | 6 | 1
WC | (Belgium) K Clijsters | 7 | 4 | 6
(Switzerland) P Schnyder | 5 | 4
5 | (Serbia) J Janković | 7 | 6

Third round
(France) A Rezaï | 3 | 4
(Russia) A Kleybanova | 6 | 6
WC | (Belgium) K Clijsters | 6 | 3 | 5
5 | (Serbia) J Janković | 1 | 6 | 7

Quarterfinals
(Russia) A Kleybanova | 6^{6} | 7 | 6
5 | (Serbia) J Janković | 7 | 6^{7} | 2

==== Section 2 ====
First round
Q | (Belgium) Y Wickmayer | 6^{4} | 2
Q | (Ukraine) K Bondarenko | 7 | 6
WC | (Canada) V Tétreault | 2 | 4
(Hungary) Á Szávay | 6 | 6
(Spain) C Suárez Navarro | 3 | 3
14 | (Poland) A Radwańska | 6 | 6
10 | (Russia) N Petrova | 3 | 4
(Russia) M Sharapova | 6 | 6
(Austria) S Bammer | 3 | 6 | 6
(Russia) A Chakvetadze | 6 | 4 | 2
Q | (Italy) R Vinci | 6 | 6
WC | (Canada) S Dubois | 1 | 2

Second round
3 | (United States) V Williams | 6 | 5 | 4
Q | (Ukraine) K Bondarenko | 1 | 7 | 6
(Hungary) Á Szávay | 1 | 1
14 | (Poland) A Radwańska | 6 | 6
(Russia) M Sharapova | 6 | 7
(Austria) S Bammer | 3 | 6^{5}
Q | (Italy) R Vinci | 3 | 3
7 | (Russia) V Zvonareva | 6 | 6

Third round
Q | (Ukraine) K Bondarenko | 5 | 3
14 | (Poland) A Radwańska | 7 | 6
(Russia) M Sharapova | 6 | 7
7 | (Russia) V Zvonareva | 2 | 6^{3}

Quarterfinals
14 | (Poland) A Radwańska | 2 | 6^{5}
(Russia) M Sharapova | 6 | 7

=== Bottom half ===
==== Section 3 ====
First round
Q | (Canada) H El Tabakh | 6^{2} | 6^{4}
(Australia) S Stosur | 7 | 7
(France) V Razzano | 6^{3} | 6 | 6
(Russia) E Makarova | 7 | 0 | 2
Q | (Russia) M Kirilenko | 3 | 3
12 | (Italy) F Pennetta | 6 | 6
15 | (France) A Mauresmo | 2 | 6 | 1
(Italy) F Schiavone | 6 | 3 | 6
(Israel) S Pe'er | 6 | 4 | 7
Q | (Romania) M Niculescu | 4 | 6 | 6^{4}
(Czech Republic) I Benešová | 3 | 4
(Japan) A Sugiyama | 6 | 6

Second round
6 | (Russia) S Kuznetsova | 4 | 3
(Australia) S Stosur | 6 | 6
(France) V Razzano | 6 | 6
12 | (Italy) F Pennetta | 3 | 1
(Italy) F Schiavone | 6^{2} | 4
(Israel) S Pe'er | 7 | 6
(Japan) A Sugiyama | 3 | 2
4 | (Russia) E Dementieva | 6 | 6

Third round
(Australia) S Stosur | 6 | 6
(France) V Razzano | 3 | 1
(Israel) S Pe'er | 1 | 6 | 4
4 | (Russia) E Dementieva | 6 | 1 | 6

Quarterfinals
(Australia) S Stosur | 7 | 1 | 3
4 | (Russia) E Dementieva | 6^{3} | 6 | 6

==== Section 4 ====
First round
(Russia) E Vesnina | 3 | 2
(China) J Zheng | 6 | 6
Q | (Czech Republic) L Šafářová | 6 | 7
(Estonia) K Kanepi | 4 | 6^{3}
Q | (Slovakia) M Rybáriková | 6 | 3 | 2
11 | (Serbia) A Ivanovic | 2 | 6 | 6
13 | (France) M Bartoli | 4 | 3
(Ukraine) A Bondarenko | 6 | 6
Q | (Russia) A Kudryavtseva | 2 | 6 | 7
Q | (France) J Coin | 6 | 1 | 6^{6}
Q | (Kazakhstan) Y Shvedova | 7 | 7
(Slovakia) D Hantuchová | 6^{1} | 6^{4}

Second round
8 | (Denmark) C Wozniacki | 5 | 3
(China) J Zheng | 7 | 6
Q | (Czech Republic) L Šafářová | 3 | 7 | 6
11 | (Serbia) A Ivanovic | 6 | 5 | 3
(Ukraine) A Bondarenko | 6 | 6
Q | (Russia) A Kudryavtseva | 3 | 0
Q | (Kazakhstan) Y Shvedova | 3 | 2
2 | (United States) S Williams | 6 | 6

Third round
(China) J Zheng | 6^{3} | 4
Q | (Czech Republic) L Šafářová | 7 | 6
(Ukraine) A Bondarenko | 1 | 4
2 | (United States) S Williams | 6 | 6

Quarterfinals
Q | (Czech Republic) L Šafářová | 3 | 2
2 | (United States) S Williams | 6 | 6
