= 2013 Southern California Open – Singles =

Singles
- 2013 Southern California Open

Final
- Champion: (Australia) Samantha Stosur
- Runner-up: (Belarus) Victoria Azarenka
- Score: 6–2, 6–3

Details
- Draw: 28
- Seeds: 8

Events
Singles	Doubles
- Southern California Open

Dominika Cibulková was the defending champion, but lost in the first round to Ana Ivanovic.

Samantha Stosur won the title, defeating Victoria Azarenka in the final for the only time in her career with the score 6–2, 6–3.

== Seeds ==
The top four seeds receive a bye into the second round.

1. (Belarus) Victoria Azarenka (final)
2. (Poland) Agnieszka Radwańska (quarterfinals)
3. (Czech Republic) Petra Kvitová (quarterfinals)
4. (Italy) Roberta Vinci (quarterfinals)
5. (Australia) Samantha Stosur (champion)
6. (Serbia) Jelena Janković (second round)
7. (Serbia) Ana Ivanovic (semifinals)
8. (Spain) Carla Suárez Navarro (second round)

== Draw ==
Key

- Q = Qualifier
- WC = Wild card
- LL = Lucky loser
- Alt = Alternate
- ITF = ITF entry
- PR = Protected ranking
- SR = Special ranking
- SE = Special exempt
- JE = Junior exempt
- JR = Junior Accelerator Programme entrant
- CO = College Accelerator Programme entrant
- NG = Next Gen Accelerator Program entrant
- w/o = Walkover
- r = Retired
- d = Defaulted

=== Finals ===
Semifinals
1	(Belarus) Victoria Azarenka	6	4	6
7	(Serbia) Ana Ivanovic	0	6	3
WC	(France) Virginie Razzano	6^{2}	3
5/WC	(Australia) Samantha Stosur	7^{7}	6

Final
1	(Belarus) Victoria Azarenka	2	3
5/WC	(Australia) Samantha Stosur	6	6

=== Top half ===
First round
(Italy) F Pennetta	6^{4}	7^{8}	4
(Italy) F Schiavone	7^{7}	6^{6}	6
(Poland) U Radwańska	7^{7}	6
Q	(New Zealand) M Erakovic	6^{3}	4
(United States) M Burdette	6	1	4
6	(Serbia) J Janković	4	6	6
(Puerto Rico) M Puig	6	1	2
(United States) B Mattek-Sands	2	6	6
Q	(United States) C Vandeweghe	6	6
WC	(United States) A Kiick	1	2
(Slovakia) D Cibulková	6	3	2
7	(Serbia) A Ivanovic	4	6	6

Second round
1	(Belarus) V Azarenka	6	6
(Italy) F Schiavone	2	3
(Poland) U Radwańska	6	4	6
6	(Serbia) J Janković	2	6	3
4	(Italy) R Vinci	6	6
(United States) B Mattek-Sands	4	2
Q	(United States) C Vandeweghe	6^{5}	3
7	(Serbia) A Ivanovic	7^{7}	6

Quarterfinals
1	(Belarus) V Azarenka	6	6
(Poland) U Radwańska	1	2
4	(Italy) R Vinci	1	7^{7}	2
7	(Serbia) A Ivanovic	6	6^{1}	6

Semifinals
1	(Belarus) V Azarenka	6	4	6
7	(Serbia) A Ivanovic	0	6	3

=== Bottom half ===
First round
8	(Spain) C Suárez Navarro	6	6
Q	(Japan) S Ishizu	4	3
(Russia) S Kuznetsova	2	4
WC	(France) V Razzano	6	6
(United Kingdom) L Robson	4	7	6
(Japan) A Morita	6	5	2
5/WC	(Australia) S Stosur	7	6
(United States) V Lepchenko	5	1
(Germany) J Görges	3	5
Q	(Kazakhstan) S Karatantcheva	6	7
(Slovakia) D Hantuchová	6	6
(Austria) T Paszek	0	0

Second round
8	(Spain) C Suárez Navarro	1	4
WC	(France) V Razzano	6	6
(United Kingdom) L Robson	1	2
3	(Czech Republic) P Kvitová	6	6
5/WC	(Australia) S Stosur	6	6
Q	(Kazakhstan) S Karatantcheva	4	1
(Slovakia) D Hantuchová	3	3
2	(Poland) A Radwańska	6	6

Quarterfinals
WC	(France) V Razzano	6^{6}	7	7^{10}
3	(Czech Republic) P Kvitová	7^{8}	5	6^{8}
5/WC	(Australia) S Stosur	7	2	6
2	(Poland) A Radwańska	5	6	3

Semifinals
WC	(France) V Razzano	6^{2}	3
5/WC	(Australia) S Stosur	7^{7}	6

== Qualifying ==
=== Seeds ===
1. (New Zealand) Marina Erakovic (qualified)
2. (Kazakhstan) Sesil Karatantcheva (qualified)
3. (Ukraine) Olga Savchuk (qualifying competition)
4. (Italy) Maria Elena Camerin (second round)
5. (United States) Nicole Gibbs (qualifying competition)
6. (Japan) Sachie Ishizu (qualified)
7. (Slovenia) Petra Rampre (second round)
8. (United States) Sachia Vickery (second round)

=== Qualifiers ===
1. (New Zealand) Marina Erakovic
2. (Kazakhstan) Sesil Karatantcheva
3. (United States) CoCo Vandeweghe
4. (Japan) Sachie Ishizu

=== Qualifying draw ===
==== First qualifier ====
First round
1	(New Zealand) Marina Erakovic	6	6
WC	(United States) Zoë Gwen Scandalis	2	0
WC	(United States) Jan Abaza	6	6
WC	(United States) Emily Harman	1	4
(United States) Jill Craybas	3	6	4
(United States) Julia Boserup	6	2	6
WC	(United States) Brianna Morgan	2	0
5	(United States) Nicole Gibbs	6	6

Second round
1	(New Zealand) Marina Erakovic	5	6	6
WC	(United States) Jan Abaza	7	1	1
(United States) Julia Boserup	2	3
5	(United States) Nicole Gibbs	6	6

Qualifying competition
1	(New Zealand) Marina Erakovic	6	4	6
5	(United States) Nicole Gibbs	0	6	2

==== Second qualifier ====
First round
2	(Kazakhstan) Sesil Karatantcheva	6	6
(United States) Chieh-yu Hsu	1	2
(Hungary) Katalin Marosi	6	6
WC	(Australia) Julia Moriarty	3	2
(Croatia) Ivana Lisjak	w/o
(United States) Abigail Spears
(South Africa) Natalie Grandin	1	3
8	(United States) Sachia Vickery	6	6

Second round
2	(Kazakhstan) Sesil Karatantcheva	3	6	6
(Hungary) Katalin Marosi	6	4	2
(Croatia) Ivana Lisjak	6	4	6
8	(United States) Sachia Vickery	2	6	3

Qualifying competition
2	(Kazakhstan) Sesil Karatantcheva	6^{6}	6	6
(Croatia) Ivana Lisjak	7^{8}	3	1

==== Third qualifier ====
First round
3	(Ukraine) Olga Savchuk	6	6
WC	(China) Zhang Xue	0	0
WC	(United States) Kelly Shaffer	2	1
WC	(United States) Allie Will	6	6
(United States) CoCo Vandeweghe	6	6
WC	(United States) Stephanie Hoffpauir	2	3
WC	(United States) Amanda Fink	4	6	2
7	(Slovenia) Petra Rampre	6	3	6

Second round
3	(Ukraine) Olga Savchuk	6	6
WC	(United States) Allie Will	1	0
(United States) CoCo Vandeweghe	6	6
7	(Slovenia) Petra Rampre	4	4

Qualifying competition
3	(Ukraine) Olga Savchuk	6^{3}	3
(United States) CoCo Vandeweghe	7^{7}	6

==== Fourth qualifier ====
First round
4	(Italy) Maria Elena Camerin	6	6
WC	(United States) Elizabeth Lumpkin	3	4
WC	(United States) Alexandra Stevenson	6	6
WC	(United States) Gabrielle DeSimone	3	2
(Poland) Alicja Rosolska	2	2
(United States) Asia Muhammad	6	6
(United States) Raquel Kops-Jones
6	(Japan) Sachie Ishizu	w/o

Second round
4	(Italy) Maria Elena Camerin	4	6	6^{8}
WC	(United States) Alexandra Stevenson	6	2	7^{10}
(United States) Asia Muhammad	6	4	5
6	(Japan) Sachie Ishizu	4	6	7

Qualifying competition
WC	(United States) Alexandra Stevenson
6	(Japan) Sachie Ishizu	w/o
