= 2006 Pacific Life Open – Women's doubles =

Women's doubles
- 2006 Pacific Life Open

Final
- Champions: (United States) Lisa Raymond (Australia) Samantha Stosur
- Runners-up: (Spain) Virginia Ruano Pascual (United States) Meghann Shaughnessy
- Score: 6–3, 6–4

Details
- Draw: 32 (3WC/1Q)
- Seeds: 8

Events
Singles	men	women
Doubles	men	women
← 2005 ·	Indian Wells Masters	· 2007 →

The doubles Tournament at the 2006 Pacific Life Open took place between March 6 and March 19 on the outdoor hard courts of the Indian Wells Tennis Garden in Indian Wells, United States. Lisa Raymond and Samantha Stosur won the title, defeating Virginia Ruano Pascual and Meghann Shaughnessy in the final.

== Seeds ==
1. (United States) Lisa Raymond / (Australia) Samantha Stosur (champions)
2. (Zimbabwe) Cara Black / (Australia) Rennae Stubbs (second round)
3. (Spain) Virginia Ruano Pascual / (United States) Meghann Shaughnessy (final)
4. (China) Yan Zi / (China) Zheng Jie (second round)
5. (Russia) Elena Dementieva / (Italy) Flavia Pennetta (second round)
6. (Argentina) Gisela Dulko / (Russia) Maria Kirilenko (first round)
7. (France) Émilie Loit / (United States) Corina Morariu (second round)
8. (China) Li Ting / (China) Sun Tiantian (quarterfinals)

== Draw ==
=== Key ===
- Q = Qualifier
- WC = Wild card
- LL = Lucky loser
- Alt = Alternate
- SE = Special exempt
- PR = Protected ranking
- ITF = ITF entry
- JE = Junior exempt
- w/o = Walkover
- r = Retired
- d = Defaulted
- SR = Special ranking

=== Finals ===
Semifinals
1	(United States) Lisa Raymond (Australia) Samantha Stosur	6	6
(Czech Republic) Iveta Benešová (Czech Republic) Barbora Strýcová	1	1
3	(Spain) Virginia Ruano Pascual (United States) Meghann Shaughnessy	6	6
(Greece) Eleni Daniilidou (Spain) Anabel Medina Garrigues	2	3

Final
1	(United States) Lisa Raymond (Australia) Samantha Stosur	6	7
3	(Spain) Virginia Ruano Pascual (United States) Meghann Shaughnessy	2	5

=== Top half ===
First round
1	(United States) L Raymond (Australia) S Stosur	6	6
(Italy) M Santangelo (United States) M Washington	1	4
(Russia) A Myskina (Russia) D Safina	6	4	4
(Italy) ME Camerin (Italy) T Garbin	4	6	6
(Ukraine) T Perebiynis (Argentina) ME Salerni	5	6^{2}
(United States) L Granville (Australia) N Pratt	7	7
WC	(United States) A Haynes (United States) J Jackson	3	6	2
8	(China) T Li (China) T Sun	6	4	6
4	(China) Z Yan (China) J Zheng	6	7
(Japan) S Asagoe (Australia) L McShea	1	6^{2}
(France) M Bartoli (Germany) AL Grönefeld	6	6
(United States) J Russell (Romania) A Vanc	4	4
(United States) C Gullickson (United States) M Tu	6	7
(Czech Republic) E Birnerová (Poland) M Domachowska	0	5
(Czech Republic) I Benešová (Czech Republic) B Strýcová	6	2	7
6	(Argentina) G Dulko (Russia) M Kirilenko	2	6	5

Second round
1	(United States) L Raymond (Australia) S Stosur	6	6
(Italy) ME Camerin (Italy) T Garbin	1	4
(United States) L Granville (Australia) N Pratt	4	2
8	(China) T Li (China) T Sun	6	6
4	(China) Z Yan (China) J Zheng	5	2
(France) M Bartoli (Germany) AL Grönefeld	7	6
(United States) C Gullickson (United States) M Tu	0	1
(Czech Republic) I Benešová (Czech Republic) B Strýcová	6	6

Quarterfinals
1	(United States) L Raymond (Australia) S Stosur	7	7
8	(China) T Li (China) T Sun	5	6^{1}
(France) M Bartoli (Germany) AL Grönefeld	3	7	2
(Czech Republic) I Benešová (Czech Republic) B Strýcová	6	6^{4}	6

Semifinals
1	(United States) L Raymond (Australia) S Stosur	6	6
(Czech Republic) I Benešová (Czech Republic) B Strýcová	1	1

=== Bottom half ===
First round
7	(France) E Loit (United States) C Morariu	6	6
(United States) J Craybas (China) S Peng	1	1
(Japan) R Fujiwara (Switzerland) E Gagliardi	7	6
(Ukraine) M Koryttseva (Germany) M Müller	5	4
(Israel) S Pe'er (Australia) B Stewart	6
WC	(France) N Dechy (France) T Golovin	3^{r}
WC	(United States) A Harkleroad (United States) B Mattek	1	6^{4}
3	(Spain) V Ruano Pascual (United States) M Shaughnessy	6	7
5	(Russia) E Dementieva (Italy) F Pennetta	2	7	6
Q	(Russia) A Chakvetadze (Russia) E Vesnina	6	5	4
(Greece) E Daniilidou (Spain) A Medina Garrigues	7	2	6
(France) S Cohen-Aloro (Venezuela) M Vento-Kabchi	6^{2}	6	3
(India) S Mirza (Japan) A Sugiyama	6	6
(France) S Foretz (Italy) A Serra Zanetti	1	4
(Russia) A Rodionova (Germany) J Wöhr	2	6^{4}
2	(Zimbabwe) C Black (Australia) R Stubbs	6	7

Second round
7	(France) E Loit (United States) C Morariu	2	2
(Japan) R Fujiwara (Switzerland) E Gagliardi	6	6
(Israel) S Pe'er (Australia) B Stewart	1	2
3	(Spain) V Ruano Pascual (United States) M Shaughnessy	6	6
5	(Russia) E Dementieva (Italy) F Pennetta
(Greece) E Daniilidou (Spain) A Medina Garrigues	w/o
(India) S Mirza (Japan) A Sugiyama	6^{8}	6	7
2	(Zimbabwe) C Black (Australia) R Stubbs	7	2	6^{8}

Quarterfinals
(Japan) R Fujiwara (Switzerland) E Gagliardi	2	3
3	(Spain) V Ruano Pascual (United States) M Shaughnessy	6	6
(Greece) E Daniilidou (Spain) A Medina Garrigues	6	6
2	(India) S Mirza (Japan) A Sugiyama	2	3

Semifinals
3	(Spain) V Ruano Pascual (United States) M Shaughnessy	6	6
(Greece) E Daniilidou (Spain) A Medina Garrigues	2	3

== Qualifying ==
=== Seeds ===
1. (Ukraine) Alona Bondarenko / (Ukraine) Kateryna Bondarenko (second round)
2. (Belarus) Tatiana Poutchek / (Belarus) Anastasiya Yakimova (qualifying competition)

=== Qualifiers ===
1. (Russia) Anna Chakvetadze / (Russia) Elena Vesnina

=== Qualifying draw ===
First round
1	(Ukraine) A Bondarenko (Ukraine) K Bondarenko	8
(Brazil) MF Alves (United States) A Rolle	5
WC	(Puerto Rico) K Brandi (Ukraine) J Vakulenko	2
(Russia) A Chakvetadze (Russia) E Vesnina	8
(Spain) A Parra Santonja (Venezuela) M Sequera	8
(United Kingdom) C Curran (Australia) C Dellacqua	6
(United States) N Uberoi (India) S Uberoi	8^{5}
2	(Belarus) T Poutchek (Belarus) A Yakimova	9^{7}

Second round
1	(Ukraine) A Bondarenko (Ukraine) K Bondarenko	6
(Russia) A Chakvetadze (Russia) E Vesnina	8
(Spain) A Parra Santonja (Venezuela) M Sequera	8^{0}
2	(Belarus) T Poutchek (Belarus) A Yakimova	9^{7}

Qualifying competition
(Russia) A Chakvetadze (Russia) E Vesnina	6	6
2	(Belarus) T Poutchek (Belarus) A Yakimova	0	3
