= 2005 Pacific Life Open – Women's doubles =

Women's doubles
- 2005 Pacific Life Open

Final
- Champions: (Spain) Virginia Ruano Pascual (Argentina) Paola Suárez
- Runners-up: (Russia) Nadia Petrova (United States) Meghann Shaughnessy
- Score: 7–6^{(7–3)}, 6–1

Details
- Draw: 32 (3 WC / 1 Q)
- Seeds: 8

Events
Singles	men	women
Doubles	men	women
← 2004 ·	Indian Wells Masters	· 2006 →

The women's doubles Tournament at the 2005 Pacific Life Open took place between March 7 and March 20 on the outdoor hard courts of the Indian Wells Tennis Garden in Indian Wells, California, United States. Virginia Ruano Pascual and Paola Suárez won the title, defeating Nadia Petrova and Meghann Shaughnessy in the final.

== Seeds ==
1. (Spain) Virginia Ruano Pascual / (Argentina) Paola Suárez (champions)
2. (Russia) Nadia Petrova / (United States) Meghann Shaughnessy (final)
3. (Russia) Svetlana Kuznetsova / (United States) Martina Navratilova (first round)
4. (United States) Lisa Raymond / (Australia) Rennae Stubbs (semifinals)
5. (Zimbabwe) Cara Black / (South Africa) Liezel Huber (second round)
6. (Russia) Elena Likhovtseva / (Spain) Conchita Martínez (quarterfinals)
7. (France) Marion Bartoli / (Germany) Anna-Lena Grönefeld (quarterfinals)
8. (Spain) Anabel Medina Garrigues / (Russia) Dinara Safina (second round)

== Draw ==
=== Key ===
- Q = Qualifier
- WC = Wild card
- LL = Lucky loser
- Alt = Alternate
- SE = Special exempt
- PR = Protected ranking
- ITF = ITF entry
- JE = Junior exempt
- w/o = Walkover
- r = Retired
- d = Defaulted
- SR = Special ranking

=== Finals ===
Semifinals
1	(Spain) Virginia Ruano Pascual (Argentina) Paola Suárez	6	5	6
4	(United States) Lisa Raymond (Australia) Rennae Stubbs	4	7	4
(Russia) Maria Kirilenko (Argentina) María Emilia Salerni	4	6^{9}
2	(Russia) Nadia Petrova (United States) Meghann Shaughnessy	6	7

Final
1	(Spain) Virginia Ruano Pascual (Argentina) Paola Suárez	7	6
2	(Russia) Nadia Petrova (United States) Meghann Shaughnessy	6^{3}	1

=== Top half ===
First round
1	(Spain) V Ruano Pascual (Argentina) P Suárez	6	6
(Japan) R Fujiwara (Italy) An Serra Zanetti	3	3
(United States) J Craybas (Germany) M Weingärtner	6^{4}	0
(Romania) R Dragomir (Thailand) T Tanasugarn	7	6
(United States) J Hopkins (United States) M Washington	5	2
WC	(Italy) F Pennetta (France) M Pierce	7	6
(Czech Republic) I Benešová (Czech Republic) K Peschke	2	3
6	(Russia) E Likhovtseva (Spain) C Martínez	6	6
4	(United States) L Raymond (Australia) R Stubbs	6	6
(Japan) S Asagoe (Slovenia) K Srebotnik	3	3
(Argentina) G Dulko (Venezuela) M Vento-Kabchi	5	3
(Slovakia) D Hantuchová (Italy) F Schiavone	7	6
(Russia) E Bovina (Russia) E Dementieva	6	6
(France) S Cohen-Aloro (Spain) M Marrero	0	4
(Russia) A Jidkova (Ukraine) T Perebiynis	6^{5}	2
7	(France) M Bartoli (Germany) AL Grönefeld	7	6

Second round
1	(Spain) V Ruano Pascual (Argentina) P Suárez	7	6
(Romania) R Dragomir (Thailand) T Tanasugarn	5	2
WC	(Italy) F Pennetta (France) M Pierce	6	5	2
6	(Russia) E Likhovtseva (Spain) C Martínez	4	7	6
4	(United States) L Raymond (Australia) R Stubbs	6	6
(Slovakia) D Hantuchová (Italy) F Schiavone	0	3
(Russia) E Bovina (Russia) E Dementieva	4	3
7	(France) M Bartoli (Germany) AL Grönefeld	6	6

Quarterfinals
1	(Spain) V Ruano Pascual (Argentina) P Suárez	2	6	6
6	(Russia) E Likhovtseva (Spain) C Martínez	6	1	1
4	(United States) L Raymond (Australia) R Stubbs	6	6
7	(France) M Bartoli (Germany) AL Grönefeld	3	0

Semifinals
1	(Spain) V Ruano Pascual (Argentina) P Suárez	6	5	6
4	(United States) L Raymond (Australia) R Stubbs	4	7	4

=== Bottom half ===
First round
5	(Zimbabwe) C Black (South Africa) L Huber	6	6
(Czech Republic) G Navrátilová (Czech Republic) M Paštiková	1	3
(Hungary) P Mandula (Croatia) S Talaja	6^{5}	3
Q	(Russia) M Kirilenko (Argentina) ME Salerni	7	6
(United States) J Russell (Italy) M Santangelo	6	5	4
(United States) L Granville (Chinese Taipei) J Lee	2	7	6
WC	(Switzerland) E Gagliardi (Serbia and Montenegro) J Janković	6	6
3	(Russia) S Kuznetsova (United States) M Navratilova	2	2
8	(Spain) A Medina Garrigues (Russia) D Safina	6	6
(Greece) E Daniilidou (Australia) N Pratt	3	2
(Australia) B Stewart (Australia) S Stosur	4	4
(Italy) T Garbin (France) É Loit	6	6
(Australia) L McShea (United States) A Spears	6	6
(Luxembourg) C Schaul (United States) M Tu	1	4
WC	(France) N Dechy (France) T Golovin	2	6^{4}
2	(Russia) N Petrova (United States) M Shaughnessy	6	7

Second round
5	(Zimbabwe) C Black (South Africa) L Huber	5	3
Q	(Russia) M Kirilenko (Argentina) ME Salerni	7	6
(United States) L Granville (Chinese Taipei) J Lee	6	6^{2}	6
WC	(Switzerland) E Gagliardi (Serbia and Montenegro) J Janković	3	7	1
8	(Spain) A Medina Garrigues (Russia) D Safina	4	3
(Italy) T Garbin (France) É Loit	6	6
(Australia) L McShea (United States) A Spears	3	5
2	(Russia) N Petrova (United States) M Shaughnessy	6	7

Quarterfinals
Q	(Russia) M Kirilenko (Argentina) ME Salerni	6	6
(United States) L Granville (Chinese Taipei) J Lee	3	1
(Italy) T Garbin (France) É Loit	1	2
2	(Russia) N Petrova (United States) M Shaughnessy	6	6

Semifinals
Q	(Russia) M Kirilenko (Argentina) ME Salerni	1	2
2	(Russia) N Petrova (United States) M Shaughnessy	6	6

== Qualifying ==
=== Seeds ===
1. (Czech Republic) Eva Birnerová / (Romania) Andreea Vanc (second round)
2. (Czech Republic) Denisa Chládková / (Slovakia) Ľubomíra Kurhajcová (second round)

=== Qualifiers ===
1. (Russia) Maria Kirilenko / (Argentina) María Emilia Salerni

=== Qualifying draw ===
First round
1	(Czech Republic) E Birnerová (Romania) A Vanc	8
(United States) A Haynes (Czech Republic) N Vaidišová	3
(Russia) M Kirilenko (Argentina) ME Salerni	9
(Ukraine) A Bondarenko (Russia) G Voskoboeva	7
(Canada) M Drake (Japan) N Miyagi	8^{5}
(Ukraine) Y Beygelzimer (Ukraine) Y Fedak	9^{7}
(Spain) N Llagostera V. (Italy) Ad Serra Zanetti	4
2	(Czech Republic) D Chládková (Slovakia) Ľ Kurhajcová	8

Second round
1	(Czech Republic) E Birnerová (Romania) A Vanc	3
(Russia) M Kirilenko (Argentina) ME Salerni	8
(Ukraine) Y Beygelzimer (Ukraine) Y Fedak	8
2	(Czech Republic) D Chládková (Slovakia) Ľ Kurhajcová	1

Qualifying competition
(Russia) M Kirilenko (Argentina) ME Salerni	6	6
(Ukraine) Y Beygelzimer (Ukraine) Y Fedak	1	3
