= 2006 WTA Tour Championships – Doubles =

Doubles
- 2006 WTA Tour Championships

Final
- Champions: (United States) Lisa Raymond (Australia) Samantha Stosur
- Runners-up: (Zimbabwe) Cara Black (Australia) Rennae Stubbs
- Score: 3–6, 6–3, 6–3

Details
- Draw: 4
- Seeds: 4

Events
Singles	Doubles
← 2005 ·	WTA Tour Championships	· 2007 →

Defending champions Lisa Raymond and Samantha Stosur defeated Cara Black and Rennae Stubbs in a rematch of the previous year's final, 3–6, 6–3, 6–3 to win the doubles tennis title at the 2006 WTA Tour Championships. With the win, they secured the joint-year-end world No. 1 ranking.

== Seeds ==
1. (United States) Lisa Raymond / (Australia) Samantha Stosur (champions)
2. (China) Yan Zi / (China) Zheng Jie (semifinals)
3. (Zimbabwe) Cara Black / (Australia) Rennae Stubbs (final)
4. (Czech Republic) Květa Peschke / (Italy) Francesca Schiavone (semifinals)

== Draw ==
=== Key ===
- Q = Qualifier
- WC = Wild card
- LL = Lucky loser
- Alt = Alternate
- SE = Special exempt
- PR = Protected ranking
- ITF = ITF entry
- JE = Junior exempt
- w/o = Walkover
- r = Retired
- d = Defaulted
- SR = Special ranking

=== Finals ===
Semifinals
1	(United States) Lisa Raymond (Australia) Samantha Stosur	6	6
4	(Czech Republic) Květa Peschke (Italy) Francesca Schiavone	1	4
3	(Zimbabwe) Cara Black (Australia) Rennae Stubbs	7	2	7
2	(China) Yan Zi (China) Zheng Jie	5	6	5

Final
1	(United States) Lisa Raymond (Australia) Samantha Stosur	3	6	6
3	(Zimbabwe) Cara Black (Australia) Rennae Stubbs	6	3	3
