= 2009 Rogers Cup – Women's doubles =

Women's doubles
- 2009 Rogers Cup

Final
- Champions: (Spain) Nuria Llagostera Vives (Spain) María José Martínez Sánchez
- Runners-up: (Australia) Samantha Stosur (Australia) Rennae Stubbs
- Score: 2–6, 7–5, [11–9]

Details
- Draw: 28
- Seeds: 8

Events
Singles	men	women
Doubles	men	women
- Rogers Cup

Cara Black and Liezel Huber were the defending champions, but lost in the semifinals against Samantha Stosur and Rennae Stubbs.

Nuria Llagostera Vives and María José Martínez Sánchez won in the final 2–6, 7–5, [11–9] against Samantha Stosur and Rennae Stubbs.

== Seeds ==
The top four seeds receive a bye into the second round.

1. (Zimbabwe) Cara Black / (United States) Liezel Huber (semifinals)
2. (Spain) Anabel Medina Garrigues / (Spain) Virginia Ruano Pascual (second round)
3. (Australia) Samantha Stosur / (Australia) Rennae Stubbs (final)
4. (Slovakia) Daniela Hantuchová / (Japan) Ai Sugiyama (semifinals)
5. (Chinese Taipei) Hsieh Su-wei / (China) Peng Shuai (second round)
6. (Spain) Nuria Llagostera Vives / (Spain) María José Martínez Sánchez (champions)
7. (Germany) Anna-Lena Grönefeld / (Switzerland) Patty Schnyder (first round)
8. (United States) Bethanie Mattek-Sands / (Russia) Nadia Petrova (first round)

== Draw ==
Key

- Q = Qualifier
- WC = Wild card
- LL = Lucky loser
- Alt = Alternate
- ITF = ITF entry
- PR = Protected ranking
- SR = Special ranking
- SE = Special exempt
- JE = Junior exempt
- JR = Junior Accelerator Programme entrant
- CO = College Accelerator Programme entrant
- NG = Next Gen Accelerator Program entrant
- w/o = Walkover
- r = Retired
- d = Defaulted

=== Finals ===
Semifinals
1	(Zimbabwe) Cara Black (United States) Liezel Huber	6	3	[7]
3	(Australia) Samantha Stosur (Australia) Rennae Stubbs	3	6	[10]
4	(Slovakia) Daniela Hantuchová (Japan) Ai Sugiyama	4	4
6	(Spain) Nuria Llagostera Vives (Spain) María José Martínez Sánchez	6	6

Final
3	(Australia) Samantha Stosur (Australia) Rennae Stubbs	6	5	[9]
6	(Spain) Nuria Llagostera Vives (Spain) María José Martínez Sánchez	2	7	[11]

=== Top half ===
First round
(Russia) M Kirilenko (Russia) E Vesnina	6	6^{5}	[10]
WC	(Canada) S Dubois (Canada) R Marino	2	7	[6]
(Ukraine) A Bondarenko (Ukraine) K Bondarenko	1	6	[8]
(Czech Republic) L Hradecká (Kazakhstan) G Voskoboeva	6	4	[10]
(Russia) V Dushevina (Russia) An Rodionova	3	7	[10]
7	(Germany) A-L Grönefeld (Switzerland) P Schnyder	6	6^{1}	[8]
(Turkey) İ Şenoğlu (Kazakhstan) Y Shvedova	6	6
(Chinese Taipei) C-j Chuang (Canada) M-È Pelletier	4	4
(India) S Mirza (Italy) F Schiavone	6^{10}	2
(Uzbekistan) A Amanmuradova (Russia) A Kudryavtseva	7	6
(Belarus) V Azarenka (Russia) V Zvonareva	6	0	[6]
5	(Chinese Taipei) S-w Hsieh (China) S Peng	4	6	[10]

Second round
1	(Zimbabwe) C Black (United States) L Huber	6	7
(Russia) M Kirilenko (Russia) E Vesnina	4	5
(Czech Republic) L Hradecká (Kazakhstan) G Voskoboeva	2	2
(Russia) V Dushevina (Russia) An Rodionova	6	6
3	(Australia) S Stosur (Australia) R Stubbs	6	6
(Turkey) İ Şenoğlu (Kazakhstan) Y Shvedova	2	4
(Uzbekistan) A Amanmuradova (Russia) A Kudryavtseva	4	7	[10]
5	(Chinese Taipei) S-w Hsieh (China) S Peng	6	6^{2}	[5]

Quarterfinals
1	(Zimbabwe) C Black (United States) L Huber	6	7
(Russia) V Dushevina (Russia) An Rodionova	4	6^{2}
3	(Australia) S Stosur (Australia) R Stubbs	6^{5}	6	[10]
(Uzbekistan) A Amanmuradova (Russia) A Kudryavtseva	7	4	[8]

Semifinals
1	(Zimbabwe) C Black (United States) L Huber	6	3	[7]
3	(Australia) S Stosur (Australia) R Stubbs	3	6	[10]

=== Bottom half ===
First round
8	(United States) B Mattek-Sands (Russia) N Petrova	2	2
(Russia) A Kleybanova (Russia) Ek Makarova	6	6
(Poland) K Jans (Poland) A Rosolska	1	7	[10]
WC	(Canada) S Fichman (Canada) A Wozniak	6	6^{5}	[4]
(China) Z Yan (China) J Zheng	4	6	[7]
(Poland) A Radwańska (Denmark) C Wozniacki	6	4	[10]
6	(Spain) N Llagostera Vives (Spain) MJ Martínez Sánchez	6	7
(United States) V King (Romania) M Niculescu	1	5
WC	(Russia) S Kuznetsova (France) A Mauresmo	6	6
(Slovakia) J Husárová (Spain) A Parra Santonja	0	4
(Argentina) G Dulko (Israel) S Pe'er	1	6	[0]
(Czech Republic) I Benešová (Czech Republic) B Záhlavová-Strýcová	6	4	[10]

Second round
(Russia) A Kleybanova (Russia) Ek Makarova	7	6
(Poland) K Jans (Poland) A Rosolska	6^{5}	3
(Poland) A Radwańska (Denmark) C Wozniacki	4	2
4	(Slovakia) D Hantuchová (Japan) A Sugiyama	6	6
6	(Spain) N Llagostera Vives (Spain) MJ Martínez Sánchez	6	6
WC	(Russia) S Kuznetsova (France) A Mauresmo	3	0
(Czech Republic) I Benešová (Czech Republic) B Záhlavová-Strýcová	6	6
2	(Spain) A Medina Garrigues (Spain) V Ruano Pascual	3	3

Quarterfinals
(Russia) A Kleybanova (Russia) Ek Makarova	4	3
4	(Slovakia) D Hantuchová (Japan) A Sugiyama	6	6
6	(Spain) N Llagostera Vives (Spain) MJ Martínez Sánchez	4	6	[10]
(Czech Republic) I Benešová (Czech Republic) B Záhlavová-Strýcová	6	3	[4]

Semifinals
4	(Slovakia) D Hantuchová (Japan) A Sugiyama	4	4
6	(Spain) N Llagostera Vives (Spain) MJ Martínez Sánchez	6	6
