= Roberta Vinci career statistics =

Career finals
Discipline	Type	Won	Lost	Total
Singles	Grand Slam	0	1	1
Singles	Summer Olympics	–	–	–
Singles	WTA Finals (Note: Formerly known as: Virginia Slims Championships (until 1995); WTA Tour Championships (until 2014))	–	–	–
Singles	WTA Elite (Note: Elite tier: WTA Tournament of Champions (2009–14); WTA Elite Trophy (2015–present))	–	–	–
Singles	WTA 1000 (Note: Formerly known as: Category 4 & 5 & 6 (until 1990); Tier I (until 2009); WTA Premier Mandatory and 5 (until 2021))	–	–	–
Singles	WTA 500 (Note: Formerly known as: Category 3 (until 1990); Tier II (until 2009); WTA Premier (until 2021))	1	0	1
Singles	WTA 250 (Note: Formerly known as: Category 1 & 2 (until 1990); Tier III & IV & V (until 2009); WTA International (until 2021))	9	4	13
Singles	Total	10	5	15
Doubles	Grand Slam	5	3	8
Doubles	Summer Olympics	–	–	–
Doubles	WTA Finals	–	–	–
Doubles	WTA Elite	–	–	–
Doubles	WTA 1000	5	7	12
Doubles	WTA 500	2	4	6
Doubles	WTA 250	13	4	17
Doubles	Total	25	18	43
Total		35	23	58

This is a list of the main career statistics of Italian professional tennis player Roberta Vinci.

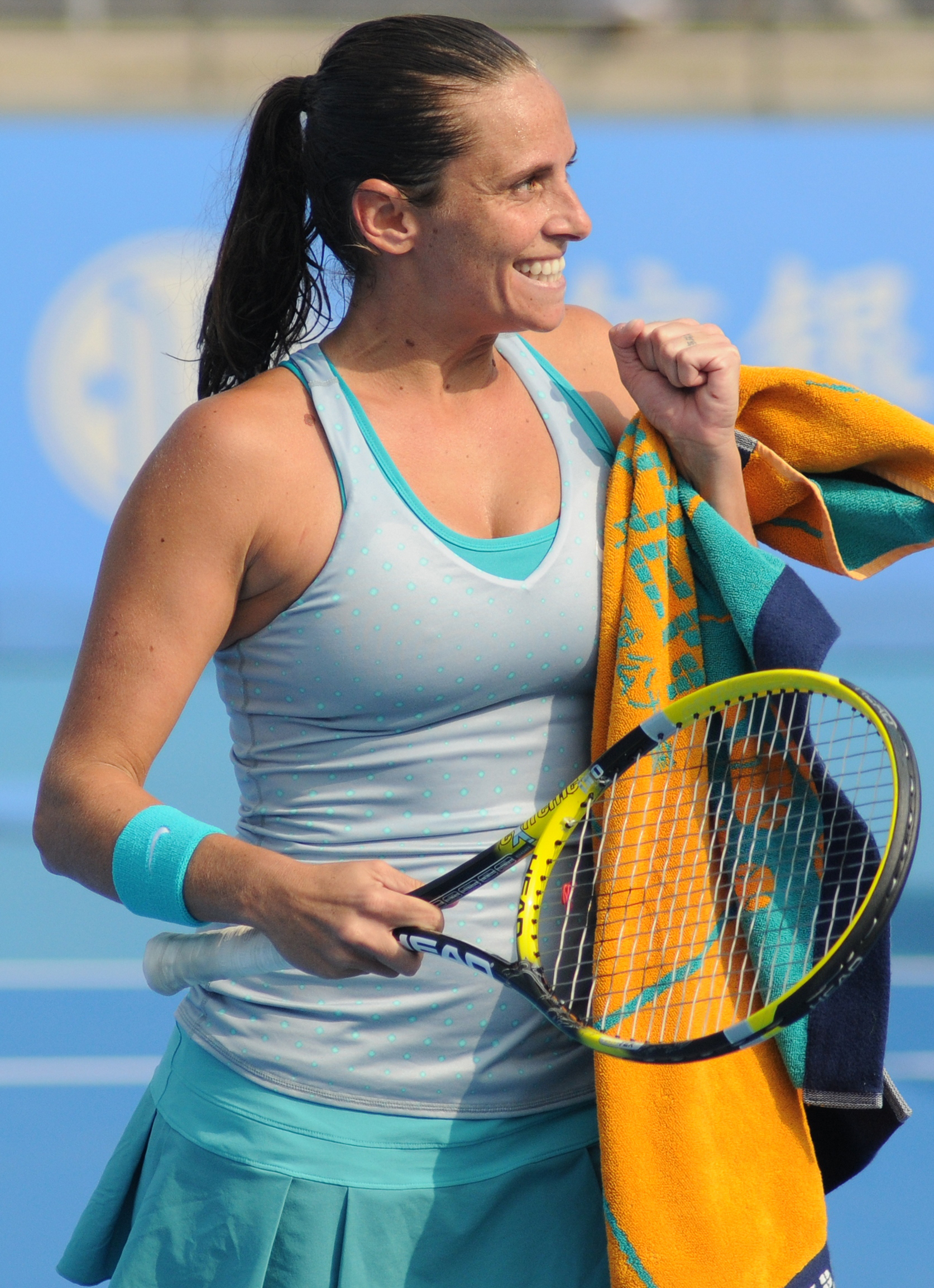
Vinci at the 2014 China Open.

== Performance timelines ==
Key
W	F	SF	QF	#R	RR	Q#	P#	DNQ	A	Z#	PO	G	S	B	NMS	NTI	P	NH

(W) winner; (F) finalist; (SF) semifinalist; (QF) quarterfinalist; (#R) rounds 4, 3, 2, 1; (RR) round-robin stage; (Q#) qualification round; (P#) preliminary round; (DNQ) did not qualify; (A) absent; (Z#) Davis/Fed Cup Zonal Group (with number indication) or (PO) play-off; (G) gold, (S) silver or (B) bronze Olympic/Paralympic medal; (NMS) not a Masters tournament; (NTI) not a Tier I tournament; (P) postponed; (NH) not held; (SR) strike rate (events won / competed); (W–L) win–loss record.

Only main-draw results in WTA Tour, Grand Slam tournaments, Billie Jean King Cup (Fed Cup), Hopman Cup and Olympic Games are included in win–loss records.

=== Singles ===
Tournament	1999	2000	2001	2002	2003	2004	2005	2006	2007	2008	2009	2010	2011	2012	2013	2014	2015	2016	2017	2018	SR	W–L	Win%
Grand Slams tournaments
Australian Open	A	A	A	Q1	Q2	Q3	Q1	3R	1R	1R	1R	3R	1R	2R	3R	1R	2R	3R	1R	Q1	0 / 12	10–12	45%
French Open	A	A	A	Q2	Q2	1R	1R	1R	1R	Q1	1R	2R	3R	1R	4R	1R	1R	1R	1R	A	0 / 13	6–13	32%
Wimbledon	A	A	A	1R	Q3	Q3	3R	A	2R	Q2	3R	2R	3R	4R	4R	1R	1R	3R	1R	A	0 / 12	16–12	57%
US Open	A	A	1R	Q1	A	1R	1R	1R	1R	2R	1R	1R	3R	QF	QF	3R	F	QF	1R	A	0 / 15	23–15	61%
Win–loss	0–0	0–0	0–1	0–1	0–0	0–2	2–3	2–3	1–4	1–2	2–4	4–4	6–4	8–4	12–4	2–4	6–4	8–4	0–4	0–0	0 / 52	55–52	51%
National representation
Summer Olympics	NH	A	NH			A	NH			A	NH			1R	NH			1R	NH		0 / 1	0–2	0%
Year-end championship
WTA Elite Trophy	NH										A	A	1R	SF	A	A	SF	RR	DNQ		0 / 4	3–7	30%
WTA 1000 + former^{†} tournaments
Dubai / Qatar Open (Note: The first Premier 5 event of the year has switched back and forth between the Dubai Tennis Championships and the Qatar Total Open since 2009. Dubai was classified as a Premier 5 event from 2009 to 2011 before being succeeded by Doha for the 2012–2014 period. In 2015, Dubai regained its Premier 5 status while Doha was demoted to Premier status. The Premier 5 tournaments were reclassified as WTA 1000 tournaments in 2021.)	NH		NMS								A	A	2R	A	2R	1R	A	QF	1R	A	0 / 5	5–5	50%
Indian Wells Open	A	A	A	A	A	A	A	A	2R	A	2R	3R	1R	4R	3R	3R	2R	4R	3R	Q2	0 / 10	11–10	52%
Miami Open	A	A	A	A	A	A	A	1R	1R	A	Q1	3R	1R	3R	QF	2R	1R	3R	2R	Q2	0 / 10	7–10	41%
Berlin / Madrid Open (Note: In 2009, the Berlin Open was replaced by the Madrid Open. The Premier Mandatory tournaments were reclassified as WTA 1000 tournaments in 2021.)	A	A	A	A	A	Q2	A	1R	1R	A	2R	Q1	3R	3R	1R	3R	3R	1R	2R	A	0 / 10	10–10	50%
Italian Open	Q2	Q1	Q2	Q1	Q1	Q2	2R	2R	1R	2R	1R	2R	1R	1R	3R	1R	1R	2R	1R	1R	0 / 14	6–14	30%
Canadian Open	A	A	Q1	Q1	A	A	1R	A	2R	A	2R	Q2	QF	QF	3R	1R	QF	3R	1R	A	0 / 10	14–10	58%
Cincinnati Open	NH					NMS					2R	1R	1R	2R	QF	1R	1R	3R	2R	A	0 / 9	7–9	44%
Pan Pacific / Wuhan Open (Note: In 2014, the Toray Pan Pacific Open was downgraded to a Premier event and replaced by the Wuhan Open. The Premier 5 tournaments were reclassified as WTA 1000 tournaments in 2021.)	A	A	A	Q1	A	A	2R	A	QF	A	2R	3R	A	3R	2R	1R	SF	2R	1R	A	0 / 10	13–10	57%
China Open	NH	NMS									1R	2R	2R	1R	3R	QF	3R	2R	A	A	0 / 8	9–8	53%
Zurich Open^{†}	A	A	Q2	Q1	A	A	1R	A	A	NH/NMS											0 / 1	0–1	0%
Win–loss	0–0	0–0	0–0	0–0	0–0	0–0	2–4	1–3	3–6	1–1	5–7	8–6	7–8	11–8	14–9	6–9	11–8	10–9	3–8	0–1	0 / 87	82–87	49%
Career statistics
	1999	2000	2001	2002	2003	2004	2005	2006	2007	2008	2009	2010	2011	2012	2013	2014	2015	2016	2017	2018	SR	W–L	Win%
Tournaments	0	0	2	5	2	8	17	16	19	6	24	21	27	28	25	26	25	23	20	3	Career total: 297		
Titles	0	0	0	0	0	0	0	0	1	0	1	1	3	1	2	0	0	1	0	0	Career total: 10		
Finals	0	0	0	0	0	0	0	0	1	0	1	2	3	1	2	2	2	1	0	0	Career total: 15		
Hard win–loss	0–0	0–0	1–2	3–2	0–0	0–3	6–9	6–9	1–8	2–3	8–13	18–11	15–18	25–14	25–15	12–18	21–16	23–17	7–14	1–2	3 / 170	174–174	50%
Clay win–loss	0–0	0–0	0–0	1–2	1–1	2–4	3–4	4–6	6–6	3–3	11–7	8–7	15–6	10–9	20–6	9–6	8–7	3–7	1–4	0–1	6 / 89	105–86	55%
Grass win–loss	0–0	0–0	0–0	0–1	1–1	2–1	5–3	0–0	2–3	0–0	4–3	2–2	7–2	7–4	4–2	0–2	0–3	2–2	2–2	0–0	1 / 32	38–31	55%
Carpet win–loss	0–0	0–0	0–0	0–0	0–0	0–0	1–2	0–1	2–1	0–0	0–0	0–0	0–0	2–1	1–1	0–1	0–0	0–0	0–0	0–0	0 / 6	6–7	46%
Overall win–loss	0–0	0–0	1–2	4–5	2–2	4–8	15–18	10–16	11–18	5–6	23–23	28–20	37–26	44–28	50–24	21–27	29–26	28–26	10–20	1–3	10 / 297	323–298	52%
Year-end ranking	409	324	172	182	116	115	41	102	63	83	64	38	23	16	14	49	15	18	111	n/a	$11,808,215		

=== Doubles ===
Tournament	2000	2001	2002	2003	2004	2005	2006	2007	2008	2009	2010	2011	2012	2013	2014	2015	2016	SR	W–L	Win%
Grand Slams tournaments
Australian Open	A	A	3R	1R	QF	1R	1R	2R	2R	2R	2R	1R	F	W	W	3R	3R	2 / 15	30–13	70%
French Open	A	QF	QF	1R	SF	1R	3R	1R	1R	1R	2R	3R	W	F	F	3R	A	1 / 15	33–14	70%
Wimbledon	A	A	3R	1R	3R	1R	A	1R	A	1R	3R	3R	QF	3R	W	3R	1R	1 / 12	21–12	64%
US Open	A	SF	1R	A	1R	3R	2R	1R	A	1R	1R	QF	W	QF	2R	3R	A	1 / 13	22–12	65%
Win–loss	0–0	7–2	7–3	0–3	9–4	2–4	3–3	1–4	1–2	1–4	4–4	7–4	20–2	16–3	18–2	8–4	2-2	5 / 56	106–51	68%
National representation
Summer Olympics	A	NH			2R	NH			1R	NH			QF	NH			QF	0 / 4	5–4	56%
Year-end championship
WTA Finals	A	1R	A	A	A	A	A	A	A	A	A	A	SF	SF	QF	A	A	0 / 4	0–4	0%
WTA 1000 + former^{†} tournaments
Dubai / Qatar Open	NH	NMS								A	A	1R	A	W	SF	A	A	1 / 3	6–2	75%
Indian Wells Open	A	A	A	A	A	A	A	1R	A	A	A	1R	QF	2R	1R	A	A	0 / 5	2–5	29%
Miami Open	A	A	A	A	A	A	Q2	1R	A	A	A	1R	F	SF	1R	A	A	0 / 5	7–5	58%
Berlin / Madrid Open	A	A	A	A	2R	A	SF	F	A	A	1R	1R	W	A	W	A	A	2 / 7	17–5	77%
Italian Open	QF	1R	SF	1R	2R	1R	QF	F	1R	1R	2R	A	W	F	F	1R	A	1 / 15	22–12	65%
Canadian Open	A	2R	2R	A	A	1R	A	2R	A	A	QF	2R	2R	QF	W	1R	1R	1 / 11	11–10	52%
Cincinnati Open	NH				NMS					A	1R	QF	QF	QF	QF	2R	A	0 / 6	6–6	50%
Pan Pacific / Wuhan Open	A	A	F	A	A	QF	A	1R	A	A	A	A	A	A	QF	1R	A	0 / 5	5–7	42%
China Open	NMS									2R	2R	2R	A	SF	QF	A	A	0 / 5	6–5	55%
Zurich Open^{†}	A	F	1R	A	A	1R	A	A	NH/NMS									0 / 3	3–3	50%
Win–loss	2–1	4–3	6–4	0–1	2–2	1–4	5–2	9–6	0–1	1–2	4–5	4–7	15–4	15–6	16–7	1–4	0–1	0 / 65	85–60	59%
Career statistics
	2000	2001	2002	2003	2004	2005	2006	2007	2008	2009	2010	2011	2012	2013	2014	2015	2016	SR	W–L	Win%
Tournaments	1	8	13	7	11	15	11	14	5	12	20	22	19	15	19	10	8	Career total: 210		
Titles	0	1	0	0	0	1	1	0	0	0	2	3	8	3	4	1	0	Career total: 24		
Finals	0	2	2	0	0	1	1	3	0	0	3	6	10	6	7	1	0	Career total: 42		
Hard win–loss	0–0	14–5	8–8	3–2	8–5	10–7	7–4	2–6	1–2	5–4	11–11	22–12	21–8	25–9	20–10	9–5	5–5	13 / 117	171–103	62%
Clay win–loss	2–1	3–2	8–3	0–3	7–3	0–3	8–5	15–5	0–3	8–6	14–5	10–4	24–1	9–2	16–2	2–4	0–1	10 / 62	126–53	70%
Grass win–loss	0–0	0–0	2–0	2–2	3–2	1–1	0–0	0–2	0–0	2–2	4–2	5–3	8–2	2–1	8–1	2–1	0–2	2 / 25	39–21	65%
Carpet win–loss	0–0	0–0	3–1	0–0	0–0	2–1	0–1	0–1	0–0	0–0	0–0	0–0	0–0	3–0	2–0	0–0	0–0	0 / 6	10–4	71%
Overall win–loss	2–1	17–7	21–12	5–7	18–10	13–12	15–10	17–14	1–5	15–12	29–18	37–19	53–11	39–12	46–13	13–10	5-8	0 / 210	346–181	66%
Year-end ranking	228	22	33	100	25	74	72	49	220	82	40	26	1	1	1	60	188	No. 1		

== Significant finals ==
=== Grand Slams ===
==== Singles: 1 (runner-up) ====
Result	Year	Championship	Surface	Opponent	Score
Loss	2015	US Open	Hard	(Italy) Flavia Pennetta	6–7^{(4–7)}, 2–6

=== Doubles: 8 (5 titles, 3 runner-ups) ===
Result	Year	Championship	Surface	Partner	Opponents	Score
Loss	2012	Australian Open	Hard	(Italy) Sara Errani	(Russia) Svetlana Kuznetsova (Russia) Vera Zvonareva	5–7, 6–4, 6–3
Win	2012	French Open	Clay	(Italy) Sara Errani	(Russia) Maria Kirilenko (Russia) Nadia Petrova	4–6, 6–4, 6–2
Win	2012	US Open	Hard	(Italy) Sara Errani	(Czech Republic) Andrea Hlaváčková (Czech Republic) Lucie Hradecká	6–4, 6–2
Win	2013	Australian Open	Hard	(Italy) Sara Errani	(Australia) Ashleigh Barty (Australia) Casey Dellacqua	6–2, 3–6, 6–2
Loss	2013	French Open	Clay	(Italy) Sara Errani	(Russia) Ekaterina Makarova (Russia) Elena Vesnina	5–7, 2–6
Win	2014	Australian Open (2)	Hard	(Italy) Sara Errani	(Russia) Ekaterina Makarova (Russia) Elena Vesnina	6–4, 3–6, 7–5
Loss	2014	French Open	Clay	(Italy) Sara Errani	(Chinese Taipei) Hsieh Su-wei (China) Peng Shuai	4–6, 1–6
Win	2014	Wimbledon	Grass	(Italy) Sara Errani	(Hungary) Tímea Babos (France) Kristina Mladenovic	6–1, 6–3

=== WTA 1000 ===
==== Doubles: 12 (5 titles, 7 runner-ups) ====
Result	Year	Tournament	Surface	Partner	Opponents	Score
Loss	2001	Zürich Open	Hard (i)	(France) Sandrine Testud	(United States) Lindsay Davenport (United States) Lisa Raymond	3–6, 6–2, 2–6
Loss	2002	Pan Pacific Open	Carpet (i)	(Belgium) Els Callens	(United States) Lisa Raymond (Australia) Rennae Stubbs	1–6, 1–6
Loss	2007	Berlin Open	Clay	(Italy) Tathiana Garbin	(United States) Lisa Raymond (Australia) Samantha Stosur	3–6, 4–6
Loss	2007	Italian Open	Clay	(Italy) Tathiana Garbin	(France) Nathalie Dechy (Italy) Mara Santangelo	4–6, 1–6
Loss	2012	Miami Open	Hard	(Italy) Sara Errani	(Russia) Maria Kirilenko (Russia) Nadia Petrova	6–7^{(0–7)}, 6–4, [4–10]
Win	2012	Madrid Open	Clay	(Italy) Sara Errani	(Russia) Ekaterina Makarova (Russia) Elena Vesnina	6–1, 3–6, [10–4]
Win	2012	Italian Open	Clay	(Italy) Sara Errani	(Russia) Ekaterina Makarova (Russia) Elena Vesnina	6–2, 7–5
Win	2013	Qatar Open	Hard	(Italy) Sara Errani	(Russia) Nadia Petrova (Slovenia) Katarina Srebotnik	2–6, 6–3, [10–6]
Loss	2013	Italian Open	Clay	(Italy) Sara Errani	(Chinese Taipei) Hsieh Su-wei (China) Peng Shuai	6–4, 3–6, [8–10]
Win	2014	Madrid Open (2)	Clay	(Italy) Sara Errani	(Spain) Garbiñe Muguruza (Spain) Carla Suárez Navarro	6–4, 6–3
Loss	2014	Italian Open	Clay	(Italy) Sara Errani	(Czech Republic) Květa Peschke (Slovenia) Katarina Srebotnik	0–4, ret.
Win	2014	Canadian Open	Hard	(Italy) Sara Errani	(Zimbabwe) Cara Black (India) Sania Mirza	7–6^{(7–4)}, 6–3

== WTA Tour finals ==
=== Singles: 15 (10 titles, 5 runner–ups) ===
Legend Grand Slam tournaments (0–1) WTA 500 (Premier) (1–0) WTA 250 (Tier III / International) (9–4)	Finals by surface Hard (3–2) Grass (1–0) Clay (6–3)

Result	W–L	Date	Tournament	Tier	Surface	Opponent	Score
Win	1–0	Feb 2007	Copa Colsanitas, Colombia	Tier III	Clay	(Italy) Tathiana Garbin	6–7^{(5–7)}, 6–4, 0–3 ret.
Win	2–0	Apr 2009	Barcelona Ladies Open, Spain	International	Clay	(Russia) Maria Kirilenko	6–0, 6–4
Loss	2–1	Apr 2010	Barcelona Ladies Open, Spain	International	Clay	(Italy) Francesca Schiavone	1–6, 1–6
Win	3–1	Oct 2010	Luxembourg Open	International	Hard (i)	(Germany) Julia Görges	6–3, 6–4
Win	4–1	Apr 2011	Barcelona Ladies Open, Spain (2)	International	Clay	(Czech Republic) Lucie Hradecká	4–6, 6–2, 6–4
Win	5–1	Jun 2011	Rosmalen Championships, Netherlands	International	Grass	(Australia) Jelena Dokić	6–7^{(7–9)}, 6–3, 7–5
Win	6–1	Jul 2011	Budapest Grand Prix, Hungary	International	Clay	(Romania) Irina-Camelia Begu	6–4, 1–6, 6–4
Win	7–1	Aug 2012	Texas Open, United States	International	Hard	(Serbia) Jelena Janković	7–5, 6–3
Win	8–1	Apr 2013	Katowice Open, Poland	International	Clay (i)	(Czech Republic) Petra Kvitová	7–6^{(7–2)}, 6–1
Win	9–1	Jul 2013	Palermo Ladies Open, Italy	International	Clay	(Italy) Sara Errani	6–3, 3–6, 6–3
Loss	9–2	Jul 2014	Bucharest Open, Romania	International	Clay	(Romania) Simona Halep	1–6, 3–6
Loss	9–3	Jul 2014	İstanbul Cup, Turkey	International	Hard	(Denmark) Caroline Wozniacki	1–6, 1–6
Loss	9–4	May 2015	Nuremberg Cup, Germany	International	Clay	(Italy) Karin Knapp	6–7^{(5–7)}, 6–4, 1–6
Loss	9–5	Sep 2015	US Open, United States	Grand Slam	Hard	(Italy) Flavia Pennetta	6–7^{(4–7)}, 2–6
Win	10–5	Feb 2016	St. Petersburg Ladies' Trophy, Russia	Premier	Hard (i)	(Switzerland) Belinda Bencic	6–4, 6–3

=== Doubles: 43 (25 titles, 18 runner-ups) ===
Legend Grand Slam tournaments (5–3) WTA 1000 (Tier I / Premier 5 / Premier M) (5–7) WTA 500 (Tier II / Premier) (2–4) WTA 250 (Tier III / Tier IV / International) (13–4)	Finals by surface Hard (13–8) Grass (2–1) Clay (10–9)

Result	W–L	Date	Tournament	Tier	Surface	Partner	Opponents	Score
Win	1–0	Feb 2001	Qatar Ladies Open	Tier III	Hard	(France) Sandrine Testud	(Netherlands) Kristie Boogert (Netherlands) Miriam Oremans	7–5, 7–6^{(4)}
Loss	1–1	Oct 2001	Zurich Open, Switzerland	Tier I	Hard	(France) Sandrine Testud	(United States) Lindsay Davenport (United States) Lisa Raymond	6–3, 2–6, 6–2
Loss	1–2	Jan 2002	Pan Pacific Open	Tier I	Hard	(Belgium) Els Callens	(United States) Lisa Raymond (Australia) Rennae Stubbs	6–1, 6–1
Loss	1–3	Feb 2002	Dubai Championships, UAE	Tier II	Hard	(France) Sandrine Testud	(Germany) Barbara Rittner (Venezuela) María Vento-Kabchi	6–3, 6–2
Win	2–3	Sep 2005	Slovenia Open	Tier IV	Hard	(Spain) Anabel Medina Garrigues	(Croatia) Jelena Kostanić Tošić (Slovenia) Katarina Srebotnik	6–4, 5–7, 6–2
Win	3–3	Jan 2006	Canberra International, Australia	Tier IV	Hard	(Poland) Marta Domachowska	(United Kingdom) Claire Curran (Latvia) Līga Dekmeijere	7–6^{(7–5)}, 6–3
Loss	3–4	Feb 2007	Copa Colsanitas, Colombia	Tier III	Clay	(Italy) Flavia Pennetta	(Spain) Lourdes Domínguez Lino (Argentina) Paola Suárez	1–6, 6–3, [11–9]
Loss	3–5	May 2007	German Open	Tier I	Clay	(Italy) Tathiana Garbin	(United States) Lisa Raymond (Australia) Samantha Stosur	6–3, 6–4
Loss	3–6	May 2007	Italian Open	Tier I	Clay	(Italy) Tathiana Garbin	(France) Nathalie Dechy (Italy) Mara Santangelo	6–4, 6–1
Loss	3–7	Feb 2010	Mexican Open	International	Clay	(Italy) Sara Errani	(Slovenia) Polona Hercog (Czech Republic) Barbora Záhlavová-Strýcová	6–2, 1–6, [10–2]
Win	4–7	Apr 2010	Andalucia Experience, Spain	International	Clay	(Italy) Sara Errani	(Russia) Maria Kondratieva (Kazakhstan) Yaroslava Shvedova	6–4, 6–2
Win	5–7	Apr 2010	Barcelona Open, Spain	International	Clay	(Italy) Sara Errani	(Switzerland) Timea Bacsinszky (Italy) Tathiana Garbin	6–1, 3–6, [10–2]
Win	6–7	Jan 2011	Hobart International, Australia	International	Hard	(Italy) Sara Errani	(Ukraine) Kateryna Bondarenko (Latvia) Līga Dekmeijere	6–3, 7–5
Win	7–7	Feb 2011	Pattaya Open, Thailand	International	Hard	(Italy) Sara Errani	(China) Sun Shengnan (China) Zheng Jie	3–6, 6–3, [10–5]
Loss	7–8	Apr 2011	Andalucia Experience, Spain	International	Clay	(Italy) Sara Errani	(Spain) Nuria Llagostera Vives (Spain) Arantxa Parra Santonja	3–6, 6–4, [10–5]
Loss	7–9	Jun 2011	Birmingham Classic, United Kingdom	International	Grass	(Italy) Sara Errani	(Belarus) Olga Govortsova (Russia) Alla Kudryavtseva	1–6, 6–1, [10–5]
Win	8–9	Jul 2011	Palermo Ladies Open, Italy	International	Clay	(Italy) Sara Errani	(Czech Republic) Andrea Hlaváčková (Czech Republic) Klára Zakopalová	7–5, 6–1
Loss	8–10	Aug 2011	Connecticut Open, United States	Premier	Hard	(Italy) Sara Errani	(Chinese Taipei) Chuang Chia-jung (Belarus) Olga Govortsova	7–5, 6–2
Loss	8–11	Jan 2012	Australian Open	Grand Slam	Hard	(Italy) Sara Errani	(Russia) Svetlana Kuznetsova (Russia) Vera Zvonareva	5–7, 6–4, 6–3
Win	9–11	Feb 2012	Monterrey Open, Mexico	International	Hard	(Italy) Sara Errani	(Japan) Kimiko Date-Krumm (China) Zhang Shuai	6–2, 7–6^{(8–6)}
Win	10–11	Mar 2012	Mexican Open	International	Clay	(Italy) Sara Errani	(Spain) Lourdes Domínguez Lino (Spain) Arantxa Parra Santonja	6–2, 6–1
Loss	10–12	Mar 2012	Miami Open, United States	Premier M	Hard	(Italy) Sara Errani	(Russia) Maria Kirilenko (Russia) Nadia Petrova	7–6^{(7–0)}, 4–6, [10–4]
Win	11–12	Apr 2012	Barcelona Open, Spain (2)	International	Clay	(Italy) Sara Errani	(Italy) Flavia Pennetta (Italy) Francesca Schiavone	6–0, 6–2
Win	12–12	May 2012	Madrid Open, Spain	Premier M	Clay (blue)	(Italy) Sara Errani	(Russia) Ekaterina Makarova (Russia) Elena Vesnina	6–1, 3–6, [10–4]
Win	13–12	May 2012	Italian Open	Premier 5	Clay	(Italy) Sara Errani	(Russia) Ekaterina Makarova (Russia) Elena Vesnina	6–2, 7–5
Win	14–12	Jun 2012	French Open	Grand Slam	Clay	(Italy) Sara Errani	(Russia) Maria Kirilenko (Russia) Nadia Petrova	4–6, 6–4, 6–2
Win	15–12	Jun 2012	Rosmalen Open, Netherlands	International	Grass	(Italy) Sara Errani	(Russia) Maria Kirilenko (Russia) Nadia Petrova	6–4, 3–6, [11–9]
Win	16–12	Sep 2012	US Open	Grand Slam	Hard	(Italy) Sara Errani	(Czech Republic) Andrea Hlaváčková (Czech Republic) Lucie Hradecká	6–4, 6–2
Loss	16–13	Jan 2013	Sydney International, Australia	Premier	Hard	(Italy) Sara Errani	(Russia) Nadia Petrova (Slovenia) Katarina Srebotnik	6–3, 6–4
Win	17–13	Jan 2013	Australian Open	Grand Slam	Hard	(Italy) Sara Errani	(Australia) Ashleigh Barty (Australia) Casey Dellacqua	6–2, 3–6, 6–2
Win	18–13	Feb 2013	Open GDF Suez, France	Premier	Hard (i)	(Italy) Sara Errani	(Czech Republic) Andrea Hlaváčková (United States) Liezel Huber	6–1, 6–1
Win	19–13	Feb 2013	Qatar Ladies Open (2)	Premier 5	Hard	(Italy) Sara Errani	(Russia) Nadia Petrova (Slovenia) Katarina Srebotnik	2–6, 6–3, [10–6]
Loss	19–14	May 2013	Italian Open	Premier 5	Clay	(Italy) Sara Errani	(Chinese Taipei) Hsieh Su-wei (China) Peng Shuai	6–4, 3–6, [8–10]
Loss	19–15	Jun 2013	French Open	Grand Slam	Clay	(Italy) Sara Errani	(Russia) Ekaterina Makarova (Russia) Elena Vesnina	5–7, 2–6
Loss	19–16	Jan 2014	Sydney International, Australia	Premier	Hard	(Italy) Sara Errani	(Hungary) Tímea Babos (Czech Republic) Lucie Šafářová	5–7, 6–3, [7–10]
Win	20–16	Jan 2014	Australian Open (2)	Grand Slam	Hard	(Italy) Sara Errani	(Russia) Ekaterina Makarova (Russia) Elena Vesnina	6–4, 3–6, 7–5
Win	21–16	Apr 2014	Stuttgart Open, Germany	Premier	Clay	(Italy) Sara Errani	(Zimbabwe) Cara Black (India) Sania Mirza	6–2, 6–3
Win	22–16	May 2014	Madrid Open, Spain (2)	Premier M	Clay	(Italy) Sara Errani	(Spain) Garbiñe Muguruza (Spain) Carla Suárez Navarro	6–4, 6–3
Loss	22–17	May 2014	Italian Open	Premier 5	Clay	(Italy) Sara Errani	(Czech Republic) Květa Peschke (Slovenia) Katarina Srebotnik	0–4, ret.
Loss	22–18	Jun 2014	French Open	Grand Slam	Clay	(Italy) Sara Errani	(Chinese Taipei) Hsieh Su-wei (China) Peng Shuai	4–6, 1–6
Win	23–18	Jul 2014	Wimbledon, United Kingdom	Grand Slam	Grass	(Italy) Sara Errani	(Hungary) Tímea Babos (France) Kristina Mladenovic	6–1, 6–3
Win	24–18	Aug 2014	Canadian Open (Montreal)	Premier 5	Hard	(Italy) Sara Errani	(Zimbabwe) Cara Black (India) Sania Mirza	7–6^{(7–4)}, 6–3
Win	25–18	Jan 2015	Auckland Open, New Zealand	International	Hard	(Italy) Sara Errani	(Japan) Shuko Aoyama (Czech Republic) Renata Voráčová	6–2, 6–1

== ITF Circuit finals ==
=== Singles: 11 (9 titles, 2 runner–ups) ===
Legend
$75,000 tournaments
$50,000 tournaments
$25,000 tournaments
$10,000 tournaments

Result	W–L	Date	Tournament	Tier	Surface	Opponent	Score
Win	1–0	Aug 1999	ITF Cuneo, Italy	10,000	Clay	(Austria) Stefanie Haidner	6–1, 6–2
Win	2–0	Sep 1999	ITF Lecce, Italy	10,000	Clay	(Austria) Stefanie Haidner	6–3, 6–1
Win	3–0	Jul 2000	ITF Felixstowe, United Kingdom	25,000	Grass	(United Kingdom) Lorna Woodroffe	6–2, 6–2
Loss	3–1	Apr 2001	ITF Ho Chi Minh City, Vietnam	25,000	Hard	(China) Li Na	4–6, 5–7
Win	4–1	Jul 2001	ITF Felixstowe, United Kingdom	25,000	Grass	(United Kingdom) Lucie Ahl	7–5, 7–5
Win	5–1	Oct 2003	ITF Latina, Italy	50,000	Clay	(Kazakhstan) Galina Voskoboeva	6–3, 6–4
Loss	5–2	Nov 2003	ITF Poitiers, France	50,000	Hard (i)	(Croatia) Karolina Šprem	4–6, 5–7
Win	6–2	Apr 2005	ITF Dinan, France	75,000	Clay	(Czech Republic) Zuzana Ondrášková	7–5, 7–5
Win	7–2	Oct 2006	Open de Touraine, France	50,000	Hard (i)	(France) Virginie Razzano	6–3, 6–1
Win	8–2	Dec 2006	ITF Milan, Italy	50,000	Carpet (i)	(Georgia (country)) Margalita Chakhnashvili	6–2, 6–4
Win	9–2	Sep 2008	GB Pro-Series Shrewsbury, UK	75,000	Hard (i)	(Estonia) Maret Ani	7–5, 7–5

=== Doubles: 14 (9 titles, 5 runner–ups) ===
Legend
$75,000 tournaments
$50,000 tournaments
$25,000 tournaments
$10,000 tournaments

Result	W–L	Date	Tournament	Tier	Surface	Partner	Opponents	Score
Win	1–0	Apr 1998	ITF Brindisi, Italy	10,000	Clay	(Italy) Flavia Pennetta	(Slovakia) Alena Paulenková (Slovakia) Gabriela Voleková	6–4, 7–6
Win	2–0	May 1998	ITF Quartu Sant'Elena, Italy	10,000	Grass	(Italy) Flavia Pennetta	(Colombia) Giana Gutiérrez (Lithuania) Galina Misiuriova	6–3, 6–0
Win	3–0	Mar 1999	ITF Cagliari, Italy	10,000	Clay	(Italy) Flavia Pennetta	(United States) Dawn Buth (United States) Rebecca Jensen	6–3, 4–6, 6–3
Win	4–0	Aug 1999	ITF Alghero, Italy	10,000	Hard	(Italy) Flavia Pennetta	(Italy) Sabina Da Ponte (Italy) Valentina Sassi	6–2, 6–1
Win	5–0	Aug 1999	ITF Cuneo, Italy	10,000	Clay	(Italy) Sabina Da Ponte	(Italy) Cristina Coletto (Italy) Emanuela Falleti	6–2, 6–0
Loss	5–1	Sep 1999	ITF Lecce, İtaly	10,000	Clay	(Italy) Flavia Pennetta	(Argentina) Erica Krauth (Argentina) Vanesa Krauth	6–1, 6–7^{(5)}, 1–6
Loss	5–2	Mar 2001	ITF Rome, Italy	10,000	Clay	(Italy) Claudia Ivone	(Czech Republic) Iveta Benešová (Slovakia) Zuzana Kučová	6–4, 4–6, 4–6
Loss	5–3	Apr 2001	ITF Taranto, Italy	25,000	Clay	(Italy) Antonella Serra Zanetti	(Spain) Eva Bes (Argentina) Eugenia Chialvo	2–6, 6–1, 3–6
Win	6–3	Jul 2001	ITF Pamplona, Spain	25,000	Hard	(Italy) Giulia Casoni	(Australia) Trudi Musgrave (United Kingdom) Julie Pullin	7–6, 6–4
Loss	6–4	Feb 2003	ITF Southampton, United Kingdom	25,000	Hard (i)	(Italy) Giulia Casoni	(Belarus) Olga Barabanschikova (Belarus) Nadejda Ostrovskaya	3–6, 4–6
Win	7–4	Mar 2003	ITF Ostrava, Czech Republic	25,000	Hard (i)	(Serbia) Dragana Zarić	(Kazakhstan) Galina Voskoboeva (Czech Republic) Magdalena Zděnovcová	6–2, 6–4
Loss	7–5	Oct 2003	ITF Girona, Spain	50,000	Clay	(Bulgaria) Lubomira Bacheva	(Spain) Conchita Martínez Granados (Spain) María José Martínez Sánchez	5–7, 3–6
Win	8–5	Oct 2003	ITF Latina, Italy	50,000	Clay	(Italy) Mara Santangelo	(Estonia) Maret Ani (Czech Republic) Libuše Průšová	3–6, 6–2, 6–4
Win	9–5	Aug 2008	ITF Rimini, Italy	75,000	Clay	(Italy) Mara Santangelo	(Switzerland) Stefanie Vögele (Germany) Kathrin Wörle	6–1, 6–4

== Junior Grand Slam finals ==
=== Doubles: 1 (title) ===
Result	Year	Tournament	Surface	Partner	Opponents	Score
Win	1999	French Open	Clay	(Italy) Flavia Pennetta	(Germany) Mia Buric (Belgium) Kim Clijsters	7–5, 5–7, 6–4

== Record against other players ==
=== No. 1 wins ===
#	Player	Event	Surface	Round	Score	Result
1.	(Denmark) Caroline Wozniacki	2011 Canadian Open	Hard	2R	6–4, 7–5	QF
2.	(United States) Serena Williams	2015 US Open	Hard	SF	2–6, 6–4, 6–4	F

=== Top 10 wins ===
Season	2005	...	2009	2010	2011	2012	2013	2014	2015	Total
Wins	2		1	0	1	2	6	1	2	15

#	Player	vsRank	Event	Surface	Round	Score
2005
1.	(Russia) Anastasia Myskina	10	Eastbourne International, UK	Grass	QF	6–4, 7–6^{(7–3)}
2.	(Switzerland) Patty Schnyder	10	Luxembourg Open	Hard (i)	2R	7–6^{(7–3)}, 5–7, 6–4
2009
3.	(Italy) Flavia Pennetta	10	Pan Pacific Open, Japan	Hard	1R	6–1, 6–2
2011
4.	(Denmark) Caroline Wozniacki	1	Canadian Open, Toronto	Hard	2R	6–4, 7–5
2012
5.	(Germany) Angelique Kerber	7	Canadian Open, Montreal	Hard	3R	6–2, 7–6^{(9–7)}
6.	(Poland) Agnieszka Radwańska	2	US Open	Hard	4R	6–1, 6–4
2013
7.	(Germany) Angelique Kerber	6	Dubai Championships, UAE	Hard	2R	7–5, 6–1
8.	(Australia) Samantha Stosur	9	Dubai Championships, UAE	Hard	QF	6–2, 6–4
9.	(Czech Republic) Petra Kvitová	8	Katowice Open, Poland	Clay (i)	F	7–6^{(7–2)}, 6–1
10.	(Czech Republic) Petra Kvitová	8	Fed Cup, Palermo, Italy	Clay	SF	6–4, 6–1
11.	(Italy) Sara Errani	6	Palermo International, Italy	Clay	F	6–3, 3–6, 6–3
12.	(Italy) Sara Errani	6	Cincinnati Masters, U.S.	Hard	3R	6–4, 6–3
2014
13.	(Poland) Agnieszka Radwańska	6	China Open	Hard	2R	6–4, 6–4
2015
14.	(United States) Serena Williams	1	US Open	Hard	SF	2–6, 6–4, 6–4
15.	(Czech Republic) Petra Kvitová	4	Wuhan Open, China	Hard	3R	7–6^{(7–3)}, 6–2

== Longest winning streaks ==
=== 9–match singles winning streak (2012) ===
#	Tournament	Category	Start date	Surface	Rd	Opponent	Rank	Score
–	Cincinnati Open, United States	Premier 5	13 August 2012	Hard	2R	(China) Peng Shuai	32	3–6, 4–6
1	Texas Open, United States	International	20 August 2012	Hard	1R	(Chinese Taipei) Hsieh Su-wei	57	6–2, 6–2
2	Texas Open, United States	International	20 August 2012	Hard	2R	(Slovenia) Polona Hercog	63	6–2, 6–3
3	Texas Open, United States	International	20 August 2012	Hard	QF	(South Africa) Chanelle Scheepers (7)	42	7–6^{(7–1)}, 6–2
4	Texas Open, United States	International	20 August 2012	Hard	SF	(Serbia) Bojana Jovanovski (WC)	87	6–0, 6–0
5	Texas Open, United States	International	20 August 2012	Hard	F	(Serbia) Jelena Janković (2)	34	7–5, 6–3
6	US Open, United States	Grand Slam	27 August 2012	Hard	1R	(Poland) Urszula Radwańska	43	6–1, 6–1
7	US Open, United States	Grand Slam	27 August 2012	Hard	2R	(Kazakhstan) Yaroslava Shvedova	45	3–6, 7–5, 7–5
8	US Open, United States	Grand Slam	27 August 2012	Hard	3R	(Slovakia) Dominika Cibulková (13)	14	6–2, 7–5
9	US Open, United States	Grand Slam	27 August 2012	Hard	4R	(Poland) Agnieszka Radwańska (2)	2	6–1, 6–4
–	US Open, United States	Grand Slam	27 August 2012	Hard	QF	(Italy) Sara Errani (10)	10	2–6, 4–6

=== 21–match doubles winning streak (2012) ===
#	Tournament	Category	Start date	Surface	Partner	Rd	Opponent	Rank	Score
–	Stuttgart Open, Germany	Premier	23 Apr 2017	Clay	(Italy) Francesca Schiavone	1R	(Germany) Kristina Barrois (Germany) Jasmin Wöhr	65; 67	1–6, 4–6
1	Madrid Open, Spain	Premier M	7 May 2012	Clay	(Italy) Sara Errani	1R	(Poland) Klaudia Jans-Ignacik (Russia) Alla Kudryavtseva	49; 35	6–4, 6–3
2	Madrid Open, Spain	Premier M	7 May 2012	Clay	(Italy) Sara Errani	2R	(Russia) Anastasia Pavlyuchenkova (WC) (Czech Republic) Lucie Šafářová (WC)	53; 60	6–1, 6–3
3	Madrid Open, Spain	Premier M	7 May 2012	Clay	(Italy) Sara Errani	QF	(Slovakia) Dominika Cibulková (WC) (Slovakia) Janette Husárová (WC)	119; 75	6–4, 7–5
4	Madrid Open, Spain	Premier M	7 May 2012	Clay	(Italy) Sara Errani	SF	(Russia) Maria Kirilenko (4) (Russia) Nadia Petrova (4)	11; 16	7–5, 6–7^{(4–7)}, [10–5]
5	Madrid Open, Spain	Premier M	7 May 2012	Clay	(Italy) Sara Errani	W	(Russia) Ekaterina Makarova (Russia) Elena Vesnina	41; 10	6–1, 3–6, [10–4]
–	Italian Open, Italy	Premier 5	14 May 2012	Clay	(Italy) Sara Errani	1R	bye		
6	Italian Open, Italy	Premier 5	14 May 2012	Clay	(Italy) Sara Errani	2R	(Argentina) Gisela Dulko (Argentina) Paola Suárez	14; 63	6–3, 6–4
7	Italian Open, Italy	Premier 5	14 May 2012	Clay	(Italy) Sara Errani	QF	(Russia) Maria Kirilenko (5) (Russia) Nadia Petrova (5)	13; 16	7–5, 6–2
8	Italian Open, Italy	Premier 5	14 May 2012	Clay	(Italy) Sara Errani	SF	(United States) Liezel Huber (1) (United States) Lisa Raymond (1)	1; 1	6–1, 6–3
9	Italian Open, Italy	Premier 5	14 May 2012	Clay	(Italy) Sara Errani	W	(Russia) Ekaterina Makarova (Russia) Elena Vesnina	25; 7	6–2, 7–5
10	French Open, France	Grand Slam	28 May 2012	Clay	(Italy) Sara Errani	1R	(Italy) Alberta Brianti (Austria) Patricia Mayr-Achleitner	73; NR	6–1, 6–3
11	French Open, France	Grand Slam	28 May 2012	Clay	(Italy) Sara Errani	2R	(Hungary) Tímea Babos (Chinese Taipei) Hsieh Su-wei	108; 52	6–4, 6–2
12	French Open, France	Grand Slam	28 May 2012	Clay	(Italy) Sara Errani	3R	(Russia) Nina Bratchikova (Alt) (Romania) Edina Gallovits-Hall (Alt)	75; 245	6–4, 6–2
13	French Open, France	Grand Slam	28 May 2012	Clay	(Italy) Sara Errani	QF	(Russia) Ekaterina Makarova (6) (Russia) Elena Vesnina (6)	17; 7	6–4, 5–7, 6–4
14	French Open, France	Grand Slam	28 May 2012	Clay	(Italy) Sara Errani	SF	(Spain) Nuria Llagostera Vives (12) (Spain) María José Martínez Sánchez (12)	18; 40	6–4, 6–2
15	French Open, France	Grand Slam	28 May 2012	Clay	(Italy) Sara Errani	W	(Russia) Maria Kirilenko (7) (Russia) Nadia Petrova (7)	12; 15	4–6, 6–4, 6–2
16	Rosmalen Championships, Netherlands	International	18 June 2012	Grass	(Italy) Sara Errani	1R	(Greece) Eleni Daniilidou (Japan) Rika Fujiwara	69; 65	6–1, 6–2
17	Rosmalen Championships, Netherlands	International	18 June 2012	Grass	(Italy) Sara Errani	QF	(Slovenia) Andreja Klepač (Australia) Anastasia Rodionova	63; 19	6–2, 6–4
18	Rosmalen Championships, Netherlands	International	18 June 2012	Grass	(Italy) Sara Errani	SF	(Slovakia) Dominika Cibulková (Czech Republic) Barbora Záhlavová-Strýcová	85; 20	3–6, 6–3, [10–6]
19	Rosmalen Championships, Netherlands	International	18 June 2012	Grass	(Italy) Sara Errani	W	(Russia) Maria Kirilenko (2) (Russia) Nadia Petrova (2)	7; 11	6–4, 3–6, [11–9]
20	Wimbledon, United Kingdom	Grand Slam	25 June 2012	Grass	(Italy) Sara Errani	1R	(Czech Republic) Eva Birnerová (Czech Republic) Petra Cetkovská	57; 131	6–2, 6–1
21	Wimbledon, United Kingdom	Grand Slam	25 June 2012	Grass	(Italy) Sara Errani	2R	(United States) Christina McHale (Austria) Tamira Paszek	113; 278	6–1, 6–3
–	Wimbledon, United Kingdom	Grand Slam	25 June 2012	Grass	(Italy) Sara Errani	3R	(Poland) Agnieszka Radwańska (Poland) Urszula Radwańska	43; 79	w/o
–	Wimbledon, United Kingdom	Grand Slam	25 June 2012	Grass	(Italy) Sara Errani	QF	(Czech Republic) Andrea Hlaváčková (6) (Czech Republic) Lucie Hradecká (6)	17; 13	3–6, 4–6

== Team competition ==
- 2006, 2009, 2010 and 2013 Fed Cup

== See also ==
- Italy Fed Cup team
- Italy at the 2004 Summer Olympics
- Italy at the 2008 Summer Olympics
- Sara Errani career statistics
