= 2008 Italian Open – Men's singles =

Men's singles
- 2008 Italian Open

Final
- Champion: (Serbia) Novak Djokovic
- Runner-up: (Switzerland) Stanislas Wawrinka
- Score: 4–6, 6–3, 6–3

Details
- Draw: 56 (4WC/7Q)
- Seeds: 16

Events
| Singles | men | women |
| Doubles | men | women |
- Italian Open

Novak Djokovic defeated Stanislas Wawrinka in the final, 4–6, 6–3, 6–3 to win the men's singles tennis title at the 2008 Italian Open.

Rafael Nadal was the three-time defending champion, but lost in the second round to Juan Carlos Ferrero. This marked the first of only two instances in which Nadal lost his opening match at a clay court tournament (alongside the 2024 French Open). In a six-year span from 2005 and 2010, this marked Nadal's only defeat at the event.

== Seeds ==
The top eight seeds receive a bye into the second round.

1. (Switzerland) Roger Federer (quarterfinals)
2. (Spain) Rafael Nadal (second round)
3. (Serbia) Novak Djokovic (champion)
4. (Russia) Nikolay Davydenko (third round)
5. (Spain) David Ferrer (second round)
6. (United States) Andy Roddick (semifinals, retired due to a back injury)
7. (Argentina) David Nalbandian (second round)
8. (United States) James Blake (quarterfinals)
9. (France) Richard Gasquet (first round)
10. (France) Jo-Wilfried Tsonga (first round)
11. (Spain) Carlos Moyá (first round)
12. (Chile) Fernando González (third round, withdrew due to a right hamstring injury)
13. (Argentina) Juan Mónaco (second round)
14. (Spain) Tommy Robredo (quarterfinals)
15. (France) Paul-Henri Mathieu (first round)
16. (United Kingdom) Andy Murray (second round)

== Draw ==
Key

- Q = Qualifier
- WC = Wild card
- LL = Lucky loser
- Alt = Alternate
- ITF = ITF entry
- PR = Protected ranking
- SR = Special ranking
- SE = Special exempt
- JE = Junior exempt
- JR = Junior Accelerator Programme entrant
- CO = College Accelerator Programme entrant
- NG = Next Gen Accelerator Program entrant
- w/o = Walkover
- r = Retired
- d = Defaulted

=== Finals ===
Quarterfinals
1 | (Switzerland) Roger Federer | 6^{4} | 6^{7}
(Czech Republic) Radek Štěpánek | 7 | 7
3 | (Serbia) Novak Djokovic | 6 | 1
(Spain) Nicolás Almagro | 1 | 0^{r}
6 | (United States) Andy Roddick | 6 | 4 | 7
14 | (Spain) Tommy Robredo | 3 | 6 | 6^{4}
8 | (United States) James Blake | 7 | 6^{5} | 1
(Switzerland) Stanislas Wawrinka | 6^{5} | 7 | 6

Semifinals
(Czech Republic) Radek Štěpánek | 0 | 0^{r}
3 | (Serbia) Novak Djokovic | 6 | 1
6 | (United States) Andy Roddick | 0^{r}
(Switzerland) Stanislas Wawrinka | 3

Final
3 | (Serbia) Novak Djokovic | 4 | 6 | 6
(Switzerland) Stanislas Wawrinka | 6 | 3 | 3

=== Top half ===
==== Section 1 ====
First round
(Argentina) G Cañas | 6^{8} | 6 | 6
WC | (Italy) G Naso | 7 | 3 | 2
(Italy) P Starace | 6 | 2 | 6
(Croatia) M Čilić | 4 | 6 | 4
(Croatia) I Karlović | 7 | 6
15 | (France) P-H Mathieu | 6^{4} | 2
9 | (France) R Gasquet | 4 | 1
Q | (Peru) L Horna | 6 | 6
(Russia) D Tursunov | 4 | 2
(Argentina) J Acasuso | 6 | 6
(Finland) J Nieminen | 3 | 6 | 3
(Czech Republic) R Štěpánek | 6 | 3 | 6

Second round
1 | (Switzerland) R Federer | 6 | 6
(Argentina) G Cañas | 3 | 3
(Italy) P Starace | 3 | 7 | 6^{3}
(Croatia) I Karlović | 6 | 6^{5} | 7
Q | (Peru) L Horna | 6 | 7
(Argentina) J Acasuso | 3 | 6^{1}
(Czech Republic) R Štěpánek | 4 | 6 | 6
5 | (Spain) D Ferrer | 6 | 2 | 1

Third round
1 | (Switzerland) R Federer | 7 | 6
(Croatia) I Karlović | 6^{4} | 3
Q | (Peru) L Horna | 4 | 6 | 3
(Czech Republic) R Štěpánek | 6 | 1 | 6

Quarterfinals
1 | (Switzerland) R Federer | 6^{4} | 6^{7}
(Czech Republic) R Štěpánek | 7 | 7

==== Section 2 ====
First round
(Belgium) S Darcis | 7 | 7
(Croatia) I Ljubičić | 5 | 6^{5}
(South Korea) H-t Lee | 4 | 5
(Russia) I Andreev | 6 | 7
Q | (Uruguay) P Cuevas | 0 | 4
13 | (Argentina) J Mónaco | 6 | 6
12 | (Chile) F González | 3 | 7 | 7
(Serbia) J Tipsarević | 6 | 6^{0} | 6^{6}
Q | (Russia) E Korolev | 1 | 6 | 6
(Sweden) R Söderling | 6 | 3 | 4
(Spain) N Almagro | 6 | 6
WC | (Italy) F Cipolla | 1 | 3

Second round
3 | (Serbia) N Djokovic | 6 | 6
(Belgium) S Darcis | 4 | 0
(Russia) I Andreev | 4 | 6 | 6
13 | (Argentina) J Mónaco | 6 | 1 | 4
12 | (Chile) F González | 6 | 6
Q | (Russia) E Korolev | 3 | 2
(Spain) N Almagro | 6 | 7
7 | (Argentina) D Nalbandian | 4 | 5

Third round
3 | (Serbia) N Djokovic | 6 | 3 | 6
(Russia) I Andreev | 3 | 6 | 3
12 | (Chile) F González
(Spain) N Almagro | w/o

Quarterfinals
3 | (Serbia) N Djokovic | 6 | 1
(Spain) N Almagro | 1 | 0^{r}

=== Bottom half ===
==== Section 3 ====
First round
(France) M Llodra | 5 | 6 | 6^{2}
(United States) M Fish | 7 | 3 | 7
(Italy) S Bolelli | 6 | 6
Q | (France) O Patience | 0 | 3
(France) G Simon | 6 | 4 | 7
10 | (France) J-W Tsonga | 2 | 6 | 6^{6}
14 | (Spain) T Robredo | 6 | 6
(Argentina) JI Chela | 4 | 1
(France) N Mahut | 6^{5} | 6 | 7
Q | (Italy) T Fabbiano | 7 | 4 | 5
WC | (Croatia) M Ančić | 6 | 6
(Spain) F López | 4 | 4

Second round
6 | (United States) A Roddick | 6 | 6
(United States) M Fish | 1 | 4
(Italy) S Bolelli | 6 | 6
(France) G Simon | 4 | 4
14 | (Spain) T Robredo | 7 | 7
(France) N Mahut | 5 | 6^{5}
WC | (Croatia) M Ančić | 2 | 2
4 | (Russia) N Davydenko | 6 | 6

Third round
6 | (United States) A Roddick | 7 | 6
(Italy) S Bolelli | 6^{5} | 3
14 | (Spain) T Robredo | 4 | 6 | 7
4 | (Russia) N Davydenko | 6 | 2 | 6^{4}

Quarterfinals
6 | (United States) A Roddick | 6 | 4 | 7
14 | (Spain) T Robredo | 3 | 6 | 6^{4}

==== Section 4 ====
First round
(Italy) A Seppi | 6 | 6
(France) F Santoro | 4 | 2
(Italy) F Volandri | 6^{6} | 6 | 2
Q | (Ecuador) N Lapentti | 7 | 2 | 6
(Spain) F Verdasco | 6 | 6
11 | (Spain) C Moyá | 3 | 4
16 | (United Kingdom) A Murray | 5 | 6 | 1
Q | (Argentina) JM del Potro | 7 | 4 | 0^{r}
WC | (Russia) M Safin | 7 | 2 | 1
(Switzerland) S Wawrinka | 6^{5} | 6 | 6
(Spain) JC Ferrero | 6^{5} | 6 | 6
(Germany) N Kiefer | 7 | 3 | 4

Second round
8 | (United States) J Blake | 7 | 3 | 6
(Italy) A Seppi | 6^{5} | 6 | 1
Q | (Ecuador) N Lapentti | 2 | 7 | 2
(Spain) F Verdasco | 6 | 5 | 6
16 | (United Kingdom) A Murray | 2 | 6^{5}
(Switzerland) S Wawrinka | 6 | 7
(Spain) JC Ferrero | 7 | 6
2 | (Spain) R Nadal | 5 | 1

Third round
8 | (United States) J Blake | 5 | 7 | 6
(Spain) F Verdasco | 7 | 5 | 2
(Switzerland) S Wawrinka | 6 | 6
(Spain) JC Ferrero | 4 | 3

Quarterfinals
8 | (United States) J Blake | 7 | 6^{5} | 1
(Switzerland) S Wawrinka | 6^{5} | 7 | 6

== Qualifying ==
=== Qualifying seeds ===
1. (France) Gaël Monfils (qualifying competition, retired)
2. (Sweden) Jonas Björkman (qualifying competition)
3. (Romania) Victor Hănescu (first round, retired)
4. (Germany) Mischa Zverev (qualifying competition)
5. (Argentina) Juan Martín del Potro (qualified)
6. (Ecuador) Nicolás Lapentti (qualified)
7. (France) Arnaud Clément (qualifying competition)
8. (Russia) Evgeny Korolev (qualified)
9. (Serbia) Boris Pašanski (qualifying competition)
10. (Uruguay) Pablo Cuevas (qualified)
11. (Germany) Benjamin Becker (qualifying competition)
12. (Peru) Luis Horna (qualified)
13. (France) Olivier Patience (qualified)
14. (France) Édouard Roger-Vasselin (qualifying competition)

=== Qualifiers ===
1. (France) Olivier Patience
2. (Russia) Evgeny Korolev
3. (Italy) Thomas Fabbiano
4. (Peru) Luis Horna
5. (Argentina) Juan Martín del Potro
6. (Ecuador) Nicolás Lapentti
7. (Uruguay) Pablo Cuevas

=== Qualifying draw ===
==== First qualifier ====
First round
1 | (France) Gaël Monfils | 6 | 6
Alt | (Mexico) Manuel Sánchez | 4 | 2
(Italy) Stefano Galvani | 2 | 6 | 4
13 | (France) Olivier Patience | 6 | 4 | 6

Qualifying competition
1 | (France) Gaël Monfils | 3 | 0^{r}
13 | (France) Olivier Patience | 6 | 1

==== Second qualifier ====
First round
2 | (Sweden) Jonas Björkman | 6 | 3 | 7^{7}
WC | (Italy) Matteo Trevisan | 4 | 6 | 6^{5}
(Russia) Andrey Golubev | 3 | 3
8 | (Russia) Evgeny Korolev | 6 | 6

Qualifying competition
2 | (Sweden) Jonas Björkman | 6^{6} | 2
8 | (Russia) Evgeny Korolev | 7^{8} | 6

==== Third qualifier ====
First round
3 | (Romania) Victor Hănescu | 4 | 0^{r}
WC | (Italy) Thomas Fabbiano | 6 | 3
WC | (Italy) Andrea Arnaboldi | 6 | 3 | 3
9 | (Serbia) Boris Pašanski | 4 | 6 | 6

Qualifying competition
WC | (Italy) Thomas Fabbiano | 3 | 7 | 6
9 | (Serbia) Boris Pašanski | 6 | 5 | 3

==== Fourth qualifier ====
First round
4 | (Germany) Mischa Zverev | 6 | 5 | 6
(Kazakhstan) Yuri Schukin | 4 | 7 | 2
(Belarus) Max Mirnyi | 4 | 6 | 4
12 | (Peru) Luis Horna | 6 | 2 | 6

Qualifying competition
4 | (Germany) Mischa Zverev | 2 | 5
12 | (Peru) Luis Horna | 6 | 7

==== Fifth qualifier ====
First round
5 | (Argentina) Juan Martín del Potro | 6 | 4 | 6
(Italy) Francesco Aldi | 0 | 6 | 2
(Italy) Simone Vagnozzi | 6 | 4 | 2
11 | (Germany) Benjamin Becker | 4 | 6 | 6

Qualifying competition
5 | (Argentina) Juan Martín del Potro | 6 | 6
11 | (Germany) Benjamin Becker | 1 | 1

==== Sixth qualifier ====
First round
6 | (Ecuador) Nicolás Lapentti | 3 | 6 | 7
(Italy) Paolo Lorenzi | 6 | 1 | 5
(Chile) Adrián García | 4 | 3
14 | (France) Édouard Roger-Vasselin | 6 | 6

Qualifying competition
6 | (Ecuador) Nicolás Lapentti | 6 | 6
14 | (France) Édouard Roger-Vasselin | 2 | 0

==== Seventh qualifier ====
First round
7 | (France) Arnaud Clément | 4 | 6 | 6
(Italy) Leonardo Azzaro | 6 | 2 | 3
WC | (Italy) Matteo Marrai | 3 | 6 | 1
10 | (Uruguay) Pablo Cuevas | 6 | 4 | 6

Qualifying competition
7 | (France) Arnaud Clément | 3 | 3
10 | (Uruguay) Pablo Cuevas | 6 | 6
