= 2007 Italian Open – Men's doubles =

Men's doubles
- 2007 Italian Open

Final
- Champions: (France) Fabrice Santoro (Serbia) Nenad Zimonjić
- Runners-up: (United States) Bob Bryan (United States) Mike Bryan
- Score: 6–4, 6–7^{(4–7)}, [10–7]

Details
- Draw: 28
- Seeds: 8

Events
| Singles | men | women |
| Doubles | men | women |
| ← 2006 · | Italian Open | · 2008 → |

Mark Knowles and Daniel Nestor were the defending champions, but lost in semifinals to Bob Bryan and Mike Bryan.

Fabrice Santoro and Nenad Zimonjić won the title, defeating Bob Bryan and Mike Bryan 6–4, 6–7^{(4–7)}, [10–7] in the final.

== Seeds ==
All seeds received a bye into the second round.

1. (United States) Bob Bryan / (United States) Mike Bryan (final)
2. (Sweden) Jonas Björkman / (Belarus) Max Mirnyi (second round)
3. (Czech Republic) Martin Damm / (India) Leander Paes (semifinal)
4. (The Bahamas) Mark Knowles / (Canada) Daniel Nestor (semifinal)
5. (Australia) Paul Hanley / (Zimbabwe) Kevin Ullyett (quarterfinals)
6. (France) Fabrice Santoro / (Serbia) Nenad Zimonjić (champions)
7. (Israel) Jonathan Erlich / (Israel) Andy Ram (second round)
8. (Romania) Andrei Pavel / (Germany) Alexander Waske (quarterfinals)

== Draw ==
=== Key ===
- Q = Qualifier
- WC = Wild card
- LL = Lucky loser
- Alt = Alternate
- SE = Special exempt
- PR = Protected ranking
- ITF = ITF entry
- JE = Junior exempt
- w/o = Walkover
- r = Retired
- d = Defaulted
- SR = Special ranking

=== Finals ===
Semifinals
1 | (United States) Bob Bryan (United States) Mike Bryan | 6 | 5 | [10]
4 | (The Bahamas) Mark Knowles (Canada) Daniel Nestor | 4 | 7 | [3]
3 | (Czech Republic) Martin Damm (India) Leander Paes | 3 | 4
6 | (France) Fabrice Santoro (Serbia) Nenad Zimonjić | 6 | 6

Final
1 | (United States) Bob Bryan (United States) Mike Bryan | 4 | 7^{7} | [7]
6 | (France) Fabrice Santoro (Serbia) Nenad Zimonjić | 6 | 6^{4} | [10]

=== Top half ===
First round
(Chile) F González (Argentina) S Prieto | 1 | 4
(France) A Clément (France) M Llodra | 6 | 6
(Switzerland) R Federer (Switzerland) S Wawrinka | 4 | 6^{5}
(Spain) C Moyá (Spain) R Nadal | 6 | 7^{7}
(Austria) J Knowle (Austria) J Melzer | 6^{6} | 4
(Australia) L Hewitt (Australia) T Perry | 7^{8} | 6
(Cyprus) M Baghdatis (Czech Republic) J Levinský | 4 | 6 | [10]
(Czech Republic) T Berdych (Slovakia) D Hrbatý | 6 | 0 | [8]

Second round
1 | (United States) B Bryan (United States) M Bryan | 6 | 6
(France) A Clément (France) M Llodra | 4 | 1
(Spain) C Moyá (Spain) R Nadal | 7 | 6
7 | (Israel) J Erlich (Israel) A Ram | 5 | 4
4 | (The Bahamas) M Knowles (Canada) D Nestor | 6 | 6
(Australia) L Hewitt (Australia) T Perry | 3 | 4
(Cyprus) M Baghdatis (Czech Republic) J Levinský | 6^{2} | 4
5 | (Australia) P Hanley (Zimbabwe) K Ullyett | 7^{7} | 6

Quarterfinals
1 | (United States) B Bryan (United States) M Bryan | 6 | 6
(Spain) C Moyá (Spain) R Nadal | 3 | 3
4 | (The Bahamas) M Knowles (Canada) D Nestor | 6 | 7^{7}
5 | (Australia) P Hanley (Zimbabwe) K Ullyett | 3 | 6^{4}

Semifinals
1 | (United States) B Bryan (United States) M Bryan | 6 | 5 | [10]
4 | (The Bahamas) M Knowles (Canada) D Nestor | 4 | 7 | [3]

=== Bottom half ===
First round
(India) M Bhupathi (Czech Republic) R Štěpánek | 4 | 6 | [9]
(Finland) J Nieminen (Sweden) R Söderling | 6 | 4 | [11]
Alt | (Argentina) J Acasuso (Argentina) JI Chela | 7^{7} | 1 | [6]
(United States) J Blake (United States) M Fish | 6^{4} | 6 | [10]
WC | (Italy) D Bracciali (Italy) P Starace | 6 | 0 | [9]
(Sweden) S Aspelin (Australia) A Fisher | 4 | 6 | [11]
(Croatia) L Ljubičić (United States) J Thomas | 6 | 3 | [10]
WC | (Italy) S Bolelli (Italy) A Seppi | 3 | 6 | [8]

Second round
8 | (Romania) A Pavel (Germany) A Waske | 6 | 7
(Finland) J Nieminen (Sweden) R Söderling | 4 | 5
(United States) J Blake (United States) M Fish
3 | (Czech Republic) M Damm (India) L Paes | w/o
6 | (France) F Santoro (Serbia) N Zimonjić | 4 | 6 | [10]
(Sweden) S Aspelin (Australia) A Fisher | 6 | 2 | [7]
(Croatia) L Ljubičić (United States) J Thomas | 6 | 7^{7}
2 | (Sweden) J Björkman (Belarus) M Mirnyi | 4 | 6^{4}

Quarterfinals
8 | (Romania) A Pavel (Germany) A Waske | 4 | 3
3 | (Czech Republic) M Damm (India) L Paes | 6 | 6
6 | (France) F Santoro (Serbia) N Zimonjić | 6 | 6
(Croatia) L Ljubičić (United States) J Thomas | 2 | 4

Semifinals
3 | (Czech Republic) M Damm (India) L Paes | 3 | 4
6 | (France) F Santoro (Serbia) N Zimonjić | 6 | 6
