= 2014 Rogers Cup – Women's singles =

Women's singles
- 2014 Rogers Cup

Final
- Champion: (Poland) Agnieszka Radwańska
- Runner-up: (United States) Venus Williams
- Score: 6–4, 6–2

Details
- Draw: 56
- Seeds: 16

Events
| Singles | men | women |
| Doubles | men | women |
- Rogers Cup

Agnieszka Radwańska defeated Venus Williams in the final, 6–4, 6–2 to win the women's singles tennis title at the 2014 Canadian Open.

Serena Williams was the defending champion, but lost to her sister Venus in the semifinals.

== Seeds ==
The top eight seeds received a bye into the second round.

1. (United States) Serena Williams (semifinals)
2. (Czech Republic) Petra Kvitová (third round)
3. (Poland) Agnieszka Radwańska (champion)
4. (Russia) Maria Sharapova (third round)
5. (Canada) Eugenie Bouchard (second round)
6. (Germany) Angelique Kerber (third round)
7. (Serbia) Jelena Janković (third round)
8. (Belarus) Victoria Azarenka (quarterfinals)
9. (Serbia) Ana Ivanovic (second round)
10. (Slovakia) Dominika Cibulková (second round)
11. (Denmark) Caroline Wozniacki (quarterfinals)
12. (Italy) Flavia Pennetta (first round)
13. (Italy) Sara Errani (first round)
14. (Spain) Carla Suárez Navarro (quarterfinals)
15. (Czech Republic) Lucie Šafářová (third round)
16. (Germany) Andrea Petkovic (withdrew because of a viral illness)

Click on the seed number of a player to go to their draw section.

== Draw ==
Key

- Q = Qualifier
- WC = Wild card
- LL = Lucky loser
- Alt = Alternate
- ITF = ITF entry
- PR = Protected ranking
- SR = Special ranking
- SE = Special exempt
- JE = Junior exempt
- JR = Junior Accelerator Programme entrant
- CO = College Accelerator Programme entrant
- NG = Next Gen Accelerator Program entrant
- w/o = Walkover
- r = Retired
- d = Defaulted

=== Finals ===
Quarterfinals
1 | (United States) Serena Williams | 4 | 7 | 7
11 | (Denmark) Caroline Wozniacki | 6 | 5 | 5
14 | (Spain) Carla Suárez Navarro | 6 | 2 | 3
(United States) Venus Williams | 4 | 6 | 6
8 | (Belarus) Victoria Azarenka | 2 | 2
3 | (Poland) Agnieszka Radwańska | 6 | 6
Q | (United States) CoCo Vandeweghe | 1 | 6 | 1
(Russia) Ekaterina Makarova | 6 | 4 | 6

Semifinals
1 | (United States) Serena Williams | 7^{7} | 2 | 3
(United States) Venus Williams | 6^{2} | 6 | 6
3 | (Poland) Agnieszka Radwańska | 7^{7} | 7^{7}
(Russia) Ekaterina Makarova | 6^{1} | 6^{3}

Final
(United States) Venus Williams | 4 | 2
3 | (Poland) Agnieszka Radwańska | 6 | 6

=== Top half ===
==== Section 1 ====
First round
Q | (Puerto Rico) M Puig | 2 | 2
(Australia) S Stosur | 6 | 6
(United States) A Riske | 1 | 3
(Slovakia) M Rybáriková | 6 | 6
(Romania) S Cîrstea | 4 | 2
15 | (Czech Republic) L Šafářová | 6 | 6
11 | (Denmark) C Wozniacki | 6 | 6
(Slovakia) D Hantuchová | 1 | 1
Q | (Netherlands) K Bertens | 5 | 6^{5}
(Czech Republic) K Koukalová | 7 | 7^{7}
WC | (Croatia) A Tomljanović | 4 | 6^{5}
Q | (United States) S Rogers | 6 | 7^{7}

Second round
1 | (United States) S Williams | 6 | 6
(Australia) S Stosur | 0 | 2
(Slovakia) M Rybáriková | 4 | 2
15 | (Czech Republic) L Šafářová | 6 | 6
11 | (Denmark) C Wozniacki | 6 | 6
(Czech Republic) K Koukalová | 1 | 2
Q | (United States) S Rogers | 6 | 2 | 6
5 | (Canada) E Bouchard | 0 | 6 | 0

Third round
1 | (United States) S Williams | 7 | 6
15 | (Czech Republic) L Šafářová | 5 | 4
11 | (Denmark) C Wozniacki | 6 | 6
Q | (United States) S Rogers | 1 | 0

Quarterfinals
1 | (United States) S Williams | 4 | 7 | 7
11 | (Denmark) C Wozniacki | 6 | 5 | 5

==== Section 2 ====
First round
(Spain) G Muguruza | 6 | 6^{4} | 6
Q | (Canada) S Dubois | 1 | 7^{7} | 2
Q | (Belgium) Y Wickmayer | 2 | 1
LL | (Czech Republic) Ka Plíšková | 6 | 6
(Serbia) B Jovanovski | 4 | 3
14 | (Spain) C Suárez Navarro | 6 | 6
12 | (Italy) F Pennetta | 6^{5} | 3
Q | (Kazakhstan) Y Putintseva | 7^{7} | 6
(Russia) A Pavlyuchenkova | 1 | 6 | 2
(United States) V Williams | 6 | 3 | 6
(France) C Garcia | 6 | 6^{6} | 6
Q | (Italy) K Knapp | 2 | 7^{8} | 1

Second round
4 | (Russia) M Sharapova | 4 | 6 | 6
(Spain) G Muguruza | 6 | 3 | 1
LL | (Czech Republic) Ka Plíšková | 1 | 6 | 3
14 | (Spain) C Suárez Navarro | 6 | 3 | 6
Q | (Kazakhstan) Y Putintseva | 3 | 2
(United States) V Williams | 6 | 6
(France) C Garcia | 4 | 1
6 | (Germany) A Kerber | 6 | 6

Third round
4 | (Russia) M Sharapova | 2 | 6 | 2
14 | (Spain) C Suárez Navarro | 6 | 4 | 6
(United States) V Williams | 6 | 3 | 6
6 | (Germany) A Kerber | 3 | 6 | 4

Quarterfinals
14 | (Spain) C Suárez Navarro | 6 | 2 | 3
(United States) V Williams | 4 | 6 | 6

=== Bottom half ===
==== Section 3 ====
First round
Q | (United States) L Davis | 3 | 5
(France) A Cornet | 6 | 7
Q | (United Kingdom) H Watson | 6 | 5 | 6
Q | (Czech Republic) T Smitková | 4 | 7 | 4
WC | (Canada) F Abanda | 1 | 6 | 0
10 | (Slovakia) D Cibulková | 6 | 3 | 6
13 | (Italy) S Errani | 1 | 5
(Germany) S Lisicki | 6 | 7
(Russia) S Kuznetsova | 1 | 2^{r}
(United States) M Keys | 6 | 3
(Italy) R Vinci | 5 | 5
(Czech Republic) B Záhlavová-Strýcová | 7 | 7

Second round
8 | (Belarus) V Azarenka | 6 | 2 | 6
(France) A Cornet | 4 | 6 | 4
Q | (United Kingdom) H Watson | 6 | 6^{3} | 7^{7}
10 | (Slovakia) D Cibulková | 2 | 7^{7} | 6^{5}
(Germany) S Lisicki | 4 | 6 | 6
(United States) M Keys | 6 | 1 | 4
(Czech Republic) B Záhlavová-Strýcová | 4 | 4
3 | (Poland) A Radwańska | 6 | 6

Third round
8 | (Belarus) V Azarenka | 6 | 6
Q | (United Kingdom) H Watson | 2 | 4
(Germany) S Lisicki | 1 | 6 | 3
3 | (Poland) A Radwańska | 6 | 3 | 6

Quarterfinals
8 | (Belarus) V Azarenka | 2 | 2
3 | (Poland) A Radwańska | 6 | 6

==== Section 4 ====
First round
WC | (Canada) A Wozniak | 3 | 0
(United States) S Stephens | 6 | 6
(China) S Zhang | 2 | 4
Q | (United States) C Vandeweghe | 6 | 6
Q | (Switzerland) T Bacsinszky | 1 | 2
9 | (Serbia) A Ivanovic | 6 | 6
LL | (Russia) E Vesnina | 6 | 1 | 7^{7}
(Italy) C Giorgi | 4 | 6 | 6^{1}
(Russia) E Makarova | 6 | 6
PR | (Switzerland) R Oprandi | 4 | 0
(Australia) C Dellacqua | 6 | 4 | 6
(Belgium) K Flipkens | 0 | 6 | 2

Second round
7 | (Serbia) J Janković | 6^{7} | 6 | 7^{7}
(United States) S Stephens | 7^{9} | 4 | 6^{4}
Q | (United States) C Vandeweghe | 6^{7} | 7^{9} | 6
9 | (Serbia) A Ivanovic | 7^{9} | 6^{7} | 4
LL | (Russia) E Vesnina | 3 | 2
(Russia) E Makarova | 6 | 6
(Australia) C Dellacqua | 3 | 2
2 | (Czech Republic) P Kvitová | 6 | 6

Third round
7 | (Serbia) J Janković | 6^{8} | 6 | 5
Q | (United States) C Vandeweghe | 7^{10} | 2 | 7
(Russia) E Makarova | 6 | 1 | 6
2 | (Czech Republic) P Kvitová | 4 | 6 | 2

Quarterfinals
Q | (United States) C Vandeweghe | 1 | 6 | 1
(Russia) E Makarova | 6 | 4 | 6

== Qualifying ==
=== Seeds ===
1. (China) Peng Shuai (first round)
2. (United States) Lauren Davis (qualified)
3. (Czech Republic) Karolína Plíšková (qualifying competition, lucky loser)
4. (United States) CoCo Vandeweghe (qualified)
5. (Russia) Elena Vesnina (qualifying competition, lucky loser)
6. (United States) Christina McHale (qualifying competition)
7. (Kazakhstan) Yaroslava Shvedova (withdrew)
8. (United Kingdom) Heather Watson (qualified)
9. (Belgium) Yanina Wickmayer (qualified)
10. (Germany) Annika Beck (first round)
11. (Puerto Rico) Monica Puig (qualified)
12. (South Africa) Chanelle Scheepers (withdrew)
13. (Italy) Karin Knapp (qualified)
14. (Netherlands) Kiki Bertens (qualified)
15. (France) Kristina Mladenovic (qualifying competition)
16. (Croatia) Donna Vekić (first round)
17. (Switzerland) Timea Bacsinszky (qualified)
18. (New Zealand) Marina Erakovic (withdrew)
19. (Japan) Kimiko Date-Krumm (qualifying competition, retired)
20. (Argentina) Paula Ormaechea (first round)
21. (Germany) Julia Görges (qualifying competition)
22. (Czech Republic) Kristýna Plíšková (first round)
23. (Czech Republic) Tereza Smitková (qualified)
24. (Israel) Julia Glushko (qualifying competition)
25. (Portugal) Michelle Larcher de Brito (qualifying competition)

=== Qualifiers ===
1. (United States) Shelby Rogers
2. (United States) Lauren Davis
3. (Switzerland) Timea Bacsinszky
4. (United States) CoCo Vandeweghe
5. (Czech Republic) Tereza Smitková
6. (Netherlands) Kiki Bertens
7. (Italy) Karin Knapp
8. (United Kingdom) Heather Watson
9. (Belgium) Yanina Wickmayer
10. (Kazakhstan) Yulia Putintseva
11. (Puerto Rico) Monica Puig
12. (Canada) Stéphanie Dubois

=== Lucky losers ===
1. (Czech Republic) Karolína Plíšková
2. (Russia) Elena Vesnina

=== Qualifying draw ===
==== First qualifier ====
First round
1 | (China) Peng Shuai | 1 | 3
(United States) Shelby Rogers | 6 | 6
WC | (Canada) Carol Zhao | 3 | 6 | 6
22 | (Czech Republic) Kristýna Plíšková | 6 | 1 | 1

Qualifying competition
(United States) Shelby Rogers | 6 | 6
WC | (Canada) Carol Zhao | 2 | 4

==== Second qualifier ====
First round
2 | (United States) Lauren Davis | 6 | 7^{10}
WC | (Canada) Heidi El Tabakh | 0 | 6^{8}
(Poland) Urszula Radwańska | 6 | 6
20 | (Argentina) Paula Ormaechea | 3 | 1

Qualifying competition
2 | (United States) Lauren Davis | 6 | 3 | 6
(Poland) Urszula Radwańska | 3 | 6 | 1

==== Third qualifier ====
First round
3 | (Czech Republic) Karolína Plíšková | 6 | 6
Alt | (Ukraine) Olga Savchuk | 1 | 2
(United States) Melanie Oudin | 2 | 5
17 | (Switzerland) Timea Bacsinszky | 6 | 7

Qualifying competition
3 | (Czech Republic) Karolína Plíšková | 5 | 4
17 | (Switzerland) Timea Bacsinszky | 7 | 6

==== Fourth qualifier ====
First round
4 | (United States) CoCo Vandeweghe | 6 | 6
WC | (Canada) Gabriela Dabrowski | 0 | 3
(Czech Republic) Kateřina Siniaková
24 | (Israel) Julia Glushko | w/o

Qualifying competition
4 | (United States) CoCo Vandeweghe | 6 | 6
24 | (Israel) Julia Glushko | 0 | 2

==== Fifth qualifier ====
First round
5 | (Russia) Elena Vesnina | 6 | 6
WC | (Canada) Maria Patrascu | 3 | 3
(United States) Grace Min | 3 | 1
23 | (Czech Republic) Tereza Smitková | 6 | 6

Qualifying competition
5 | (Russia) Elena Vesnina | 4 | 1
23 | (Czech Republic) Tereza Smitková | 6 | 6

==== Sixth qualifier ====
First round
6 | (United States) Christina McHale | 6 | 6
Alt | (Croatia) Petra Martić | 1 | 3
(United States) Anna Tatishvili | 6 | 4 | 1
14 | (Netherlands) Kiki Bertens | 4 | 6 | 6

Qualifying competition
6 | (United States) Christina McHale | 3 | 4
14 | (Netherlands) Kiki Bertens | 6 | 6

==== Seventh qualifier ====
First round
25 | (Portugal) Michelle Larcher de Brito | 6^{3} | 6 | 6
PR | (Chinese Taipei) Chan Yung-jan | 7^{7} | 4 | 3
(Czech Republic) Andrea Hlaváčková | 3 | 0
13 | (Italy) Karin Knapp | 6 | 6

Qualifying competition
25 | (Portugal) Michelle Larcher de Brito | 4 | 3
13 | (Italy) Karin Knapp | 6 | 6

==== Eighth qualifier ====
First round
8 | (United Kingdom) Heather Watson | 6 | 6^{7} | 6
(Croatia) Mirjana Lučić-Baroni | 3 | 7^{9} | 4
(Austria) Tamira Paszek | 4 | 6 | 6
16 | (Croatia) Donna Vekić | 6 | 2 | 4

Qualifying competition
8 | (United Kingdom) Heather Watson | 6 | 6
(Austria) Tamira Paszek | 3 | 2

==== Ninth qualifier ====
First round
9 | (Belgium) Yanina Wickmayer | 6 | 6
(Paraguay) Verónica Cepede Royg | 0 | 1
WC | (Canada) Gloria Liang | 2 | 3
15 | (France) Kristina Mladenovic | 6 | 6

Qualifying competition
9 | (Belgium) Yanina Wickmayer | 1 | 7^{7} | 7^{7}
15 | (France) Kristina Mladenovic | 6 | 6^{4} | 6^{4}

==== Tenth qualifier ====
First round
10 | (Germany) Annika Beck | 7^{7} | 1 | 1
Alt | (Kazakhstan) Yulia Putintseva | 6^{5} | 6 | 6
(Estonia) Anett Kontaveit | 2^{r}
19 | (Japan) Kimiko Date-Krumm | 5

Qualifying competition
Alt | (Kazakhstan) Yulia Putintseva | 4 | 6 | 1
19 | (Japan) Kimiko Date-Krumm | 6 | 3 | 0^{r}

==== Eleventh qualifier ====
First round
11 | (Puerto Rico) Monica Puig | 6 | 6
Alt | (Chinese Taipei) Chan Hao-ching | 3 | 1
(Israel) Shahar Pe'er | 2 | 6^{1}
21 | (Germany) Julia Görges | 6 | 7^{7}

Qualifying competition
11 | (Puerto Rico) Monica Puig | 6^{5} | 6 | 6
21 | (Germany) Julia Görges | 7^{7} | 1 | 4

==== Twelfth qualifier ====
First round
Alt | (Poland) Alicja Rosolska | 0 | 4
WC | (Canada) Stéphanie Dubois | 6 | 6
Alt | (Georgia (country)) Oksana Kalashnikova | 1 | 4
Alt | (Spain) Arantxa Parra Santonja | 6 | 6

Qualifying competition
WC | (Canada) Stéphanie Dubois | 6 | 3 | 6
Alt | (Spain) Arantxa Parra Santonja | 2 | 6 | 3
