= 2007 Italian Open – Women's doubles =

Women's doubles
- 2007 Italian Open

Final
- Champions: (France) Nathalie Dechy (Italy) Mara Santangelo
- Runners-up: (Italy) Tathiana Garbin (Italy) Roberta Vinci
- Score: 6–4, 6–1

Events
Singles	men	women
Doubles	men	women
← 2006 ·	Italian Open	· 2008 →

Daniela Hantuchová and Ai Sugiyama were the defending champions but decided not to defend the title together. Hantuchová chose to play with Nadia Petrova while Sugiyama played with Katarina Srebotnik. Both lost in the second round. Nathalie Dechy and Mara Santangelo won the title by defeating Tathiana Garbin and Roberta Vinci 6–4, 6–1 in the final.

== Seeds ==
The top five seeds received a bye into the second round.

1. (United States) Lisa Raymond / (Australia) Samantha Stosur (second round)
2. (Zimbabwe) Cara Black / (South Africa) Liezel Huber (semifinals)
3. (Czech Republic) Květa Peschke / (Australia) Rennae Stubbs (semifinals)
4. (Slovenia) Katarina Srebotnik / (Japan) Ai Sugiyama (second round)
5. (China) Sun Tiantian / (China) Yan Zi (quarterfinals)
6. (Spain) Anabel Medina Garrigues / (Spain) Virginia Ruano Pascual (first round)
7. (France) Nathalie Dechy / (Italy) Mara Santangelo (champions)
8. (Slovakia) Daniela Hantuchová / (Russia) Nadia Petrova (second round)

== Draw ==
=== Key ===
- Q = Qualifier
- WC = Wild card
- LL = Lucky loser
- Alt = Alternate
- ITF = ITF entry
- PR = Protected ranking
- SR = Special ranking
- SE = Special exempt
- JE = Junior exempt
- JR = Junior Accelerator Programme entrant
- CO = College Accelerator Programme entrant
- NG = Next Gen Accelerator Program entrant
- w/o = Walkover
- r = Retired
- d = Defaulted

=== Finals ===
Semifinals
7	(France) Nathalie Dechy (Italy) Mara Santangelo	6	6
3	(Czech Republic) Květa Peschke (Australia) Rennae Stubbs	4	4
(Italy) Tathiana Garbin (Italy) Roberta Vinci	6	6
(Zimbabwe) Cara Black (South Africa) Liezel Huber	3	3

Final
7	(France) Nathalie Dechy (Italy) Mara Santangelo	6	6
(Italy) Tathiana Garbin (Italy) Roberta Vinci	4	1

=== Top half ===
First round
(Slovakia) J Husárová (United States) M Shaughnessy	7	3	10
(Switzerland) E Gagliardi (Italy) F Schiavone	5	6	8
(France) S Brémond (France) A Mauresmo	2	6	3
(Netherlands) M Krajicek (United States) M Tu	6	2	10
(Argentina) G Dulko (Italy) F Pennetta	2	4
7	(France) N Dechy (Italy) M Santangelo	6	6
(China) N Li (Australia) B Stewart
(Colombia) C Castaño (Spain) L Domínguez Lino	w/o
(Italy) A Brianti (Germany) A-L Grönefeld	6	6
(Italy) C Dentoni (Italy) S Menna	1	0

Second round
1	(United States) L Raymond (Australia) S Stosur	0	4
(Slovakia) J Husárová (United States) M Shaughnessy	6	6
(Netherlands) M Krajicek (United States) M Tu	2	6^{5}
7	(France) N Dechy (Italy) M Santangelo	6	7^{7}
3	(Czech Republic) K Peschke (Australia) R Stubbs	6	6
(Colombia) C Castaño (Spain) L Domínguez Lino	3	4
(Italy) A Brianti (Germany) A-L Grönefeld	1	5
5	(China) T Sun (China) Z Yan	6	7

Quarterfinals
(Slovakia) J Husárová (United States) M Shaughnessy	4	2
7	(France) N Dechy (Italy) M Santangelo	6	6
3	(Czech Republic) K Peschke (Australia) R Stubbs	6	3	12
5	(China) T Sun (China) Z Yan	3	6	10

Semifinals
7	(France) N Dechy (Italy) M Santangelo	6	6
3	(Czech Republic) K Peschke (Australia) R Stubbs	4	4

=== Bottom half ===
First round
6	(Spain) A Medina Garrigues (Spain) V Ruano Pascual	3	6	7
(Czech Republic) I Benešová (Russia) G Voskoboeva	6	1	10
(Germany) M Müller (Czech Republic) G Navrátilová	7^{7}	6
(Greece) E Daniilidou (Germany) J Wöhr	6^{3}	2
(Italy) T Garbin (Italy) R Vinci	6	3
(France) É Loit (Australia) N Pratt	3	4
8	(Slovakia) D Hantuchová (Russia) N Petrova	6	6
(Israel) S Pe'er (Russia) D Safina	2	4
(Ukraine) Y Fedak (Czech Republic) V Uhlířová	2	3
(Italy) K Knapp (Italy) R Oprandi	6	6
(Italy) ME Camerin (Japan) A Morigami
(Italy) S Errani (Italy) G Gabba	w/o

Second round
(Czech Republic) I Benešová (Russia) G Voskoboeva	7	6
(Germany) M Müller (Czech Republic) G Navrátilová	5	1
(Italy) T Garbin (Italy) R Vinci	3	7	11
4	(Slovenia) K Srebotnik (Japan) A Sugiyama	6	5	9
8	(Slovakia) D Hantuchová (Russia) N Petrova
(Italy) K Knapp (Italy) R Oprandi	w/o
(Italy) S Errani (Italy) G Gabba	4	2
2	(Zimbabwe) C Black (South Africa) L Huber	6	6

Quarterfinals
(Czech Republic) I Benešová (Russia) G Voskoboeva	7^{13}	3	8
(Italy) T Garbin (Italy) R Vinci	6^{11}	6	10
(Italy) K Knapp (Italy) R Oprandi	7	2	4
2	(Zimbabwe) C Black (South Africa) L Huber	5	6	10

Semifinals
(Italy) T Garbin (Italy) R Vinci	6	6
(Zimbabwe) C Black (South Africa) L Huber	3	3
