= 2008 Italian Open – Women's doubles =

Women's doubles
- 2008 Italian Open

Final
- Champions: (Chinese Taipei) Chan Yung-jan (Chinese Taipei) Chuang Chia-jung
- Runners-up: (Czech Republic) Iveta Benešová (Slovakia) Janette Husárová
- Score: 7–6^{(7–5)}, 6–2

Events
Singles	men	women
Doubles	men	women
← 2007 ·	Italian Open	· 2009 →

Nathalie Dechy and Mara Santangelo were the defending champions, but Dechy chose not to participate, and only Santangelo competed that year.
Santangelo partnered with Alicia Molik, but lost in the second round to Maria Kirilenko and Agnieszka Radwańska.

Chan Yung-jan and Chuang Chia-jung won in the final 7–6^{(7–5)}, 6–2, against Iveta Benešová and Janette Husárová.

== Seeds ==
The top four seeds received a bye into the second round.

1. (Zimbabwe) Cara Black / (United States) Liezel Huber (quarterfinals)
2. (Slovenia) Katarina Srebotnik / (Japan) Ai Sugiyama (second round)
3. (Czech Republic) Květa Peschke / (Australia) Rennae Stubbs (quarterfinals)
4. (Australia) Alicia Molik / (Italy) Mara Santangelo (second round)
5. (Chinese Taipei) Chan Yung-jan / (Chinese Taipei) Chuang Chia-jung (champions)
6. (United States) Lisa Raymond / (Australia) Samantha Stosur (second round)
7. (Ukraine) Alona Bondarenko / (Ukraine) Kateryna Bondarenko (second round)
8. (Russia) Dinara Safina / (Hungary) Ágnes Szávay (withdrew due to a low back injury for Safina)
9. (China) Yan Zi / (China) Zheng Jie (second round)

== Draw ==
=== Key ===
- Q = Qualifier
- WC = Wild card
- LL = Lucky loser
- Alt = Alternate
- ITF = ITF entry
- PR = Protected ranking
- SR = Special ranking
- SE = Special exempt
- JE = Junior exempt
- JR = Junior Accelerator Programme entrant
- CO = College Accelerator Programme entrant
- NG = Next Gen Accelerator Program entrant
- w/o = Walkover
- r = Retired
- d = Defaulted

=== Finals ===
Semifinals
(China) Peng Shuai (China) Sun Tiantian	4	2
5	(Chinese Taipei) Chan Yung-jan (Chinese Taipei) Chuang Chia-jung	6	6
(Czech Republic) Iveta Benešová (Slovakia) Janette Husárová	5	6	[10]
ALT	(Poland) Klaudia Jans (Bosnia and Herzegovina) Mervana Jugić-Salkić	7	3	[2]

Final
5	(Chinese Taipei) Chan Yung-jan (Chinese Taipei) Chuang Chia-jung	7	6
(Czech Republic) Iveta Benešová (Slovakia) Janette Husárová	6^{5}	3

=== Top half ===
First round
(United States) J Craybas (Russia) A Kudryavtseva	6	6
(Belarus) T Poutchek (Russia) A Rodionova	3	4
(China) S Peng (China) T Sun	6	2	[10]
(Uzbekistan) A Amanmuradova (Russia) E Vesnina	4	6	[5]
(Czech Republic) G Navrátilová (Poland) A Rosolska	1	5
7	(Ukraine) A Bondarenko (Ukraine) K Bondarenko	6	7
(Czech Republic) L Hradecká (Netherlands) M Krajicek	6	6
(Russia) N Petrova (Russia) Y Shvedova	3	4
(Russia) V Dushevina (Russia) E Likhovtseva	7	6
(Italy) T Garbin (Italy) R Vinci	5	4
(Ukraine) M Koryttseva (Czech Republic) V Uhlířová	5	1
5	(Chinese Taipei) Y-j Chan (Chinese Taipei) C-j Chuang	7	6

Second round
1	(Zimbabwe) C Black (United States) L Huber	6	6
(United States) J Craybas (Russia) A Kudryavtseva	3	3
(China) S Peng (China) T Sun	7	6
7	(Ukraine) A Bondarenko (Ukraine) K Bondarenko	6^{2}	1
3	(Czech Republic) K Peschke (Australia) R Stubbs	4	6	[11]
(Czech Republic) L Hradecká (Netherlands) M Krajicek	6	3	[9]
(Russia) V Dushevina (Russia) E Likhovtseva	2	5
5	(Chinese Taipei) Y-j Chan (Chinese Taipei) C-j Chuang	6	7

Quarterfinals
1	(Zimbabwe) C Black (United States) L Huber	6	5	[6]
(China) S Peng (China) T Sun	4	7	[10]
3	(Czech Republic) K Peschke (Australia) R Stubbs	5	2
5	(Chinese Taipei) Y-j Chan (Chinese Taipei) C-j Chuang	7	6

Semifinals
(China) S Peng (China) T Sun	4	2
5	(Chinese Taipei) Y-j Chan (Chinese Taipei) C-j Chuang	6	6

=== Bottom half ===
First round
6	(United States) L Raymond (Australia) S Stosur	7	6
(China) C Ji (China) S Sun	5	2
(Czech Republic) I Benešová (Slovakia) J Husárová	3	6	[10]
(Russia) A Kleybanova (Russia) G Voskoboeva	6	2	[8]
WC	(Italy) S Errani (Italy) K Knapp	2	6^{6}
(Russia) M Kirilenko (Poland) A Radwańska	6	7
9	(China) Z Yan (China) J Zheng	7	6
WC	(Italy) C Dentoni (Denmark) C Wozniacki	5	3
(Spain) A Medina Garrigues (Spain) V Ruano Pascual	6	6
(Italy) ME Camerin (Argentina) G Dulko	4	2
ALT	(Poland) K Jans (Bosnia and Herzegovina) M Jugić-Salkić	7	6
WC	(Russia) A Chakvetadze (Czech Republic) N Vaidišová	6^{4}	3

Second round
6	(United States) L Raymond (Australia) S Stosur	4	6	[2]
(Czech Republic) I Benešová (Slovakia) J Husárová	6	2	[10]
(Russia) M Kirilenko (Poland) A Radwańska	6	6
4	(Australia) A Molik (Italy) M Santangelo	4	3
9	(China) Z Yan (China) J Zheng	4	2
(Spain) A Medina Garrigues (Spain) V Ruano Pascual	6	6
ALT	(Poland) K Jans (Bosnia and Herzegovina) M Jugić-Salkić	1	7	[10]
2	(Slovenia) K Srebotnik (Japan) A Sugiyama	6	5	[4]

Quarterfinals
(Czech Republic) I Benešová (Slovakia) J Husárová	6^{4}	6	[10]
(Russia) M Kirilenko (Poland) A Radwańska	7	3	[4]
(Spain) A Medina Garrigues (Spain) V Ruano Pascual	7	3	[9]
ALT	(Poland) K Jans (Bosnia and Herzegovina) M Jugić-Salkić	6^{2}	6	[11]

Semifinals
(Czech Republic) I Benešová (Slovakia) J Husárová	5	6	[10]
ALT	(Poland) K Jans (Bosnia and Herzegovina) M Jugić-Salkić	7	3	[2]
