= 2014 Rogers Cup – Women's doubles =

Women's doubles
- 2014 Rogers Cup

Final
- Champions: (Italy) Sara Errani (Italy) Roberta Vinci
- Runners-up: (Zimbabwe) Cara Black (India) Sania Mirza
- Score: 7–6^{(7–4)}, 6–3

Details
- Draw: 28
- Seeds: 8

Events
Singles	men	women
Doubles	men	women
- Rogers Cup

Jelena Janković and Katarina Srebotnik were the defending champions, but they chose not to compete together. Janković played alongside Klára Koukalová, but lost in the second round to Michaëlla Krajicek and Barbora Záhlavová-Strýcová. Srebotnik teamed up with Květa Peschke, but lost in the second round to Chan Hao-ching and Chan Yung-jan.
Sara Errani and Roberta Vinci won the title, defeating Cara Black and Sania Mirza in the final, 7–6^{(7–4)}, 6–3.

== Seeds ==
The top four seeds received a bye into the second round.

1. (Italy) Sara Errani / (Italy) Roberta Vinci (champions)
2. (Chinese Taipei) Hsieh Su-wei / (China) Peng Shuai (semifinals)
3. (Czech Republic) Květa Peschke / (Slovenia) Katarina Srebotnik (second round)
4. (Zimbabwe) Cara Black / (India) Sania Mirza (final)
5. (Russia) Ekaterina Makarova / (Russia) Elena Vesnina (quarterfinals)
6. (United States) Raquel Kops-Jones / (United States) Abigail Spears (quarterfinals)
7. (Hungary) Tímea Babos / (France) Kristina Mladenovic (first round)
8. (Russia) Alla Kudryavtseva / (Australia) Anastasia Rodionova (first round)

== Draw ==
Key

- Q = Qualifier
- WC = Wild card
- LL = Lucky loser
- Alt = Alternate
- ITF = ITF entry
- PR = Protected ranking
- SR = Special ranking
- SE = Special exempt
- JE = Junior exempt
- JR = Junior Accelerator Programme entrant
- CO = College Accelerator Programme entrant
- NG = Next Gen Accelerator Program entrant
- w/o = Walkover
- r = Retired
- d = Defaulted

=== Finals ===
Semifinals
1	(Italy) Sara Errani (Italy) Roberta Vinci	7	6
(Chinese Taipei) Chan Hao-ching (Chinese Taipei) Chan Yung-jan	5	0
4	(Zimbabwe) Cara Black (India) Sania Mirza	7^{7}	3	[13]
2	(Chinese Taipei) Hsieh Su-wei (China) Peng Shuai	6^{3}	6	[11]

Final
1	(Italy) Sara Errani (Italy) Roberta Vinci	7^{7}	6
4	(Zimbabwe) Cara Black (India) Sania Mirza	6^{4}	3

=== Top half ===
First round
(Australia) C Dellacqua (Croatia) M Lučić-Baroni	6	2	[7]
(Japan) K Date-Krumm (Czech Republic) A Hlaváčková	4	6	[10]
(Russia) A Pavlyuchenkova (Czech Republic) L Šafářová	6	7
(Slovakia) D Hantuchová (Spain) A Parra Santonja	4	6^{5}
(Switzerland) M Hingis (Italy) F Pennetta	4	6	[10]
8	(Russia) A Kudryavtseva (Australia) A Rodionova	6	2	[6]
(Germany) J Görges (Germany) A-L Grönefeld	1	4
(Chinese Taipei) H-c Chan (Chinese Taipei) Y-j Chan	6	6
(Serbia) J Janković (Czech Republic) K Koukalová	4	7^{7}	[10]
(Georgia (country)) O Kalashnikova (Ukraine) O Savchuk	6	6^{4}	[0]
(Netherlands) M Krajicek (Czech Republic) B Záhlavová-Strýcová	6	3	[10]
7	(Hungary) T Babos (France) K Mladenovic	4	6	[6]

Second round
1	(Italy) S Errani (Italy) R Vinci	6	6
(Japan) K Date-Krumm (Czech Republic) A Hlaváčková	3	2
(Russia) A Pavlyuchenkova (Czech Republic) L Šafářová	1	4
(Switzerland) M Hingis (Italy) F Pennetta	6	6
3	(Czech Republic) K Peschke (Slovenia) K Srebotnik	6	2	[7]
(Chinese Taipei) H-c Chan (Chinese Taipei) Y-j Chan	2	6	[10]
(Serbia) J Janković (Czech Republic) K Koukalová	3	6	[7]
(Netherlands) M Krajicek (Czech Republic) B Záhlavová-Strýcová	6	3	[10]

Quarterfinals
1	(Italy) S Errani (Italy) R Vinci	6	3	[10]
(Switzerland) M Hingis (Italy) F Pennetta	2	6	[1]
(Chinese Taipei) H-c Chan (Chinese Taipei) Y-j Chan	6	6
(Netherlands) M Krajicek (Czech Republic) B Záhlavová-Strýcová	3	3

Semifinals
1	(Italy) S Errani (Italy) R Vinci	7	6
(Chinese Taipei) H-c Chan (Chinese Taipei) Y-j Chan	5	0

=== Bottom half ===
First round
6	(United States) R Kops-Jones (United States) A Spears	6	6
(Australia) S Stosur (China) S Zhang	4	2
WC	(Belgium) K Flipkens (Czech Republic) P Kvitová	4	4
(France) C Garcia (Poland) A Rosolska	6	6
(New Zealand) M Erakovic (Slovenia) A Klepač	4	5
(Czech Republic) Ka Plíšková (Czech Republic) Kr Plíšková	6	7
5	(Russia) E Makarova (Russia) E Vesnina	7^{9}	6
(Spain) A Medina Garrigues (Kazakhstan) Y Shvedova	6^{7}	3
WC	(Canada) G Dabrowski (Israel) S Pe'er	6	7^{7}
Alt	(Croatia) D Jurak (United States) M Moulton-Levy	4	6^{4}
(Spain) G Muguruza (Spain) C Suárez Navarro	6	6
WC	(Canada) F Abanda (Canada) S Dubois	3	4

Second round
6	(United States) R Kops-Jones (United States) A Spears	7^{7}	7
(France) C Garcia (Poland) A Rosolska	6^{4}	5
(Czech Republic) Ka Plíšková (Czech Republic) Kr Plíšková	4	6^{1}
4	(Zimbabwe) C Black (India) S Mirza	6	7^{7}
5	(Russia) E Makarova (Russia) E Vesnina	6	7^{7}
WC	(Canada) G Dabrowski (Israel) S Pe'er	2	6^{5}
(Spain) G Muguruza (Spain) C Suárez Navarro	3	6^{2}
2	(Chinese Taipei) S-w Hsieh (China) S Peng	6	7^{7}

Quarterfinals
6	(United States) R Kops-Jones (United States) A Spears	2	1
4	(Zimbabwe) C Black (India) S Mirza	6	6
5	(Russia) E Makarova (Russia) E Vesnina	6^{6}	5
2	(Chinese Taipei) S-w Hsieh (China) S Peng	7^{8}	7

Semifinals
4	(Zimbabwe) C Black (India) S Mirza	7^{7}	3	[13]
2	(Chinese Taipei) S-w Hsieh (China) S Peng	6^{3}	6	[11]
