= 2012 Italian Open – Women's doubles =

Women's doubles
- 2012 Italian Open

Final
- Champions: (Italy) Sara Errani (Italy) Roberta Vinci
- Runners-up: (Russia) Ekaterina Makarova (Russia) Elena Vesnina
- Score: 6–2, 7–5

Details
- Draw: 28
- Seeds: 8

Events
Singles	men	women
Doubles	men	women
← 2011 ·	Italian Open	· 2013 →

Peng Shuai and Zheng Jie were the defending champions but decided not to defend the title together.
Peng chose to play with Sabine Lisicki while Zheng played with Hsieh Su-wei. Both lost in the first round.
Sara Errani and Roberta Vinci won the title by defeating Ekaterina Makarova and Elena Vesnina 6–2, 7–5 in the final.

== Seeds ==
The top four seeds receive a bye into the second round.

1. (United States) Liezel Huber / (United States) Lisa Raymond (semifinals)
2. (Czech Republic) Květa Peschke / (Slovenia) Katarina Srebotnik (second round)
3. (Italy) Sara Errani / (Italy) Roberta Vinci (champions)
4. (Czech Republic) Andrea Hlaváčková / (Australia) Anastasia Rodionova (withdrew because of a right thigh injury for Hlaváčková)
5. (Russia) Maria Kirilenko / (Russia) Nadia Petrova (quarterfinals)
6. (Germany) Julia Görges / (United States) Vania King (second round)
7. (South Africa) Natalie Grandin / (Czech Republic) Vladimíra Uhlířová (second round)
8. (United States) Raquel Kops-Jones / (United States) Abigail Spears (first round)

== Draw ==
=== Key ===
- Q = Qualifier
- WC = Wild card
- LL = Lucky loser
- Alt = Alternate
- ITF = ITF entry
- PR = Protected ranking
- SR = Special ranking
- SE = Special exempt
- JE = Junior exempt
- JR = Junior Accelerator Programme entrant
- CO = College Accelerator Programme entrant
- NG = Next Gen Accelerator Program entrant
- w/o = Walkover
- r = Retired
- d = Defaulted

=== Finals ===
Semifinals

Final

1
- (United States) Liezel Huber
- (United States) Lisa Raymond
1
3

3
- (Italy) Sara Errani
- (Italy) Roberta Vinci
6
6

3
- (Italy) Sara Errani
- (Italy) Roberta Vinci
6
7

- (Russia) Ekaterina Makarova
- (Russia) Elena Vesnina
2
5

- (Russia) Ekaterina Makarova
- (Russia) Elena Vesnina
6
6

- (United States) Jamie Hampton
- (Georgia (country)) Anna Tatishvili
3
3

=== Top half ===
First round

Second round

Quarterfinals

Semifinals

1
- (United States) L Huber
- (United States) L Raymond
6
6

- (United States) B Mattek-Sands
- (India) S Mirza
6
6

- (United States) B Mattek-Sands
- (India) S Mirza
1
3

- (New Zealand) M Erakovic
- (Romania) M Niculescu
2
1

1
- (United States) L Huber
- (United States) L Raymond
w/o

WC
- (Italy) N Burnett
- (Italy) A Virgili
2
2

- (Slovakia) D Cibulková
- (Slovakia) J Husárová

- (Slovakia) D Cibulková
- (Slovakia) J Husárová
6
6

- (Slovakia) D Cibulková
- (Slovakia) J Husárová
6
6

- (Switzerland) T Bacsinszky
- (Italy) A Brianti
0
2

7
- (South Africa) N Grandin
- (Czech Republic) V Uhlířová
3
2

7
- (South Africa) N Grandin
- (Czech Republic) V Uhlířová
6
6

1
- (United States) L Huber
- (United States) L Raymond
1
3

3
- (Italy) S Errani
- (Italy) R Vinci
6
6

3
- (Italy) S Errani
- (Italy) R Vinci
6
6

- (Argentina) G Dulko
- (Argentina) P Suárez
6
6

- (Argentina) G Dulko
- (Argentina) P Suárez
3
4

- (Sweden) S Arvidsson
- (Australia) J Gajdošová
4
2

3
- (Italy) S Errani
- (Italy) R Vinci
7
6

- (Czech Republic) I Benešová
- (Spain) A Medina Garrigues
6
6

5
- (Russia) M Kirilenko
- (Russia) N Petrova
5
2

- (Slovenia) A Klepač
- (Poland) A Rosolska
0
1

- (Czech Republic) I Benešová
- (Spain) A Medina Garrigues
2
5

- (Belarus) O Govortsova
- (Kazakhstan) G Voskoboeva
3
3

5
- (Russia) M Kirilenko
- (Russia) N Petrova
6
7

5
- (Russia) M Kirilenko
- (Russia) N Petrova
6
6

=== Bottom half ===
First round

Second round

Quarterfinals

Semifinals

8
- (United States) R Kops-Jones
- (United States) A Spears
3
1

- (Chinese Taipei) K-c Chang
- (Russia) V Dushevina
6
6

- (Chinese Taipei) K-c Chang
- (Russia) V Dushevina
3
6
[10]

WC
- (Italy) ME Camerin
- (Italy) K Knapp
w/o

WC
- (Italy) ME Camerin
- (Italy) K Knapp
6
1
[5]

- (Germany) S Lisicki
- (China) S Peng

- (Chinese Taipei) K-c Chang
- (Russia) V Dushevina
2
2

- (Spain) N Llagostera Vives
- (Spain) MJ Martínez Sánchez
5
6^{8}

- (Russia) E Makarova
- (Russia) E Vesnina
6
6

- (Russia) E Makarova
- (Russia) E Vesnina
7
7^{10}

- (Russia) E Makarova
- (Russia) E Vesnina
6
6

Alt
- (United States) J Craybas
- (United States) S Stephens
4
2

- (Russia) E Makarova
- (Russia) E Vesnina
6
6

6
- (Germany) J Görges
- (United States) V King
7
6

- (United States) J Hampton
- (Georgia (country)) A Tatishvili
3
3

- (Poland) K Jans-Ignacik
- (Russia) A Kudryavtseva
5
2

6
- (Germany) J Görges
- (United States) V King
3
6^{3}

- (United States) J Hampton
- (Georgia (country)) A Tatishvili
1
6
[11]

- (United States) J Hampton
- (Georgia (country)) A Tatishvili
6
7^{7}

- (Chinese Taipei) S-w Hsieh
- (China) J Zheng
6
3
[9]

- (United States) J Hampton
- (Georgia (country)) A Tatishvili
w/o

- (Germany) A-L Grönefeld
- (Croatia) P Martić
3
4

- (Italy) F Pennetta
- (Italy) F Schiavone

- (Italy) F Pennetta
- (Italy) F Schiavone
6
6

- (Italy) F Pennetta
- (Italy) F Schiavone
6
6

2
- (Czech Republic) K Peschke
- (Slovenia) K Srebotnik
2
4
