= 1999 Italian Open – Women's singles qualifying =

Women's singles qualifying
- 1999 Italian Open

Events
Singles	men	women
Doubles	men	women
← 1998 ·	Italian Open	· 2000 →

The 1999 Italian Open was a WTA tennis tournament, played on outdoor clay courts.

== Players ==
=== Seeds ===
1. n.a.
2. (Russia) Tatiana Panova (qualifying competition, lucky loser)
3. n.a.
4. (Venezuela) María Vento (qualifier)
5. (Greece) Christína Papadáki (qualifier)
6. (Netherlands) Seda Noorlander (qualifying competition, lucky loser)
7. (Japan) Miho Saeki (first round)
8. (Belgium) Sabine Appelmans (qualifier)
9. (Italy) Laura Golarsa (qualifying competition)
10. (Canada) Sonya Jeyaseelan (first round)

=== Qualifiers ===
1. (Italy) Germana Di Natale
2. (Belgium) Sabine Appelmans
3. (Venezuela) María Vento
4. (Italy) Francesca Schiavone
5. (United States) Sandra Cacic
6. (Russia) Elena Dementieva
7. (Greece) Christína Papadáki
8. (Italy) Antonella Serra Zanetti

=== Lucky losers ===
1. (Russia) Tatiana Panova

== Qualifying draw ==
=== Key ===
- Q = Qualifier
- WC = Wild card
- LL = Lucky loser
- Alt = Alternate
- SE = Special exempt
- PR = Protected ranking
- ITF = ITF entry
- JE = Junior exempt
- w/o = Walkover
- r = Retired
- d = Defaulted
- SR = Special ranking

=== First qualifier ===
First round
9	(Italy) Laura Golarsa
Bye
(Italy) Germana Di Natale	6	7
(Russia) Elena Makarova	2	5

Qualifying competition
(Italy) Laura Golarsa	4	3
(Italy) Germana Di Natale	6	6

=== Second qualifier ===
First round
WC	(Italy) Maria Elena Camerin	7^{8}	3	6
(Paraguay) Larissa Schaerer	6^{6}	6	2
(Brazil) Vanessa Menga	2	5
8	(Belgium) Sabine Appelmans	6	7

Qualifying competition
WC	(Italy) Maria Elena Camerin	2	2
8	(Belgium) Sabine Appelmans	6	6

=== Third qualifier ===
First round
4	(Venezuela) María Vento	6	6
(Croatia) Marijana Kovačević	0	2
(Russia) Nadia Petrova	6	6
(France) Lea Ghirardi	3	0

Qualifying competition
4	(Venezuela) María Vento	6	7
(Russia) Nadia Petrova	2	5

=== Fourth qualifier ===
First round
Bye
WC	(Italy) Francesca Schiavone
(Slovenia) Barbara Mulej	0	6	1
6	(Netherlands) Seda Noorlander	6	4	6

Qualifying competition
WC	(Italy) Francesca Schiavone	6	7
6	(Netherlands) Seda Noorlander	3	5

=== Fifth qualifier ===
First round
7	(Japan) Miho Saeki	6	5	6^{4}
(United States) Sandra Cacic	2	7	7^{7}
(Italy) Flora Perfetti	6	6
(South Africa) Liezel Horn	2	1

Qualifying competition
(United States) Sandra Cacic	2	6	6
(Italy) Flora Perfetti	6	3	4

=== Sixth qualifier ===
First round
WC	(Italy) Roberta Vinci
Bye
(Russia) Elena Dementieva	3	7^{7}	6
10	(Canada) Sonya Jeyaseelan	6	6^{3}	2

Qualifying competition
WC	(Italy) Roberta Vinci	2	6	2
(Russia) Elena Dementieva	6	4	6

=== Seventh qualifier ===
First round
5	(Greece) Christína Papadáki	7	6
(Argentina) Florencia Labat	5	1
(Germany) Jana Kandarr	6	4	3
(United States) Jill Craybas	3	6	6

Qualifying competition
5	(Greece) Christína Papadáki	6	7^{7}
(United States) Jill Craybas	4	6^{4}

=== Eighth qualifier ===
First round
(Italy) Antonella Serra Zanetti	2	6	6
WC	(Italy) Flavia Pennetta	6	2	3
(United States) Samantha Reeves	2	5
2	(Russia) Tatiana Panova	6	7

Qualifying competition
(Italy) Antonella Serra Zanetti	6	3	7^{7}
2	(Russia) Tatiana Panova	2	6	6^{5}
