= 2008 Italian Open – Women's singles =

Women's singles
- 2008 Italian Open

Final
- Champion: (Serbia) Jelena Janković
- Runner-up: (France) Alizé Cornet
- Score: 6–2, 6–2

Details
- Draw: 56 (4WC/12Q/4LL)
- Seeds: 19

Events
Singles	men	women
Doubles	men	women
← 2007 ·	Italian Open	· 2009 →

Defending champion Jelena Janković defeated Alizé Cornet in the final, 6–2, 6–2 to win the women's singles tennis title at the 2008 Italian Open. Cornet entered the tournament as a qualifier.

== Seeds ==
The top eight seeds receive a bye into the second round.

1. (Serbia) Ana Ivanovic (second round)
2. (Russia) Maria Sharapova (semifinals, withdrew due to a left calf strain)
3. (Russia) Svetlana Kuznetsova (third round)
4. (Serbia) Jelena Janković (champion)
5. (United States) Serena Williams (quarterfinals, withdrew due to a back injury)
6. (Russia) Anna Chakvetadze (semifinals)
7. (United States) Venus Williams (quarterfinals)
8. (France) Marion Bartoli (third round)
9. (Switzerland) Patty Schnyder (quarterfinals)
10. (Russia) Vera Zvonareva (third round)
11. (Hungary) Ágnes Szávay (second round)
12. (Poland) Agnieszka Radwańska (third round)
13. (Czech Republic) Nicole Vaidišová (first round)
14. (Russia) ~~Dinara Safina~~ (withdrew due to a low back injury)
15. (Israel) ~~Shahar Pe'er~~ (withdrew due to a right shoulder tendinitis)
16. (France) ~~Amélie Mauresmo~~ (withdrew due to right intercostal muscle strain)
17. (Italy) Francesca Schiavone (second round)
18. (Russia) Nadia Petrova (first round)
19. (Austria) Sybille Bammer (first round)

== Draw ==
=== Key ===
- Q = Qualifier
- WC = Wild card
- LL = Lucky loser
- Alt = Alternate
- ITF = ITF entry
- PR = Protected ranking
- SR = Special ranking
- SE = Special exempt
- JE = Junior exempt
- JR = Junior Accelerator Programme entrant
- CO = College Accelerator Programme entrant
- NG = Next Gen Accelerator Program entrant
- w/o = Walkover
- r = Retired
- d = Defaulted

=== Finals ===
Quarterfinals
Q	(Bulgaria) Tsvetana Pironkova	2	6	1
6	(Russia) Anna Chakvetadze	6	3	6
Q	(France) Alizé Cornet	w/o
5	(United States) Serena Williams
7	(United States) Venus Williams	7	2	3
4	(Serbia) Jelena Janković	5	6	6
9	(Switzerland) Patty Schnyder	7^{7}	5	2
2	(Russia) Maria Sharapova	6^{3}	7	6

Semifinals
6	(Russia) Anna Chakvetadze	6	4	3
Q	(France) Alizé Cornet	3	6	6
4	(Serbia) Jelena Janković	w/o
2	(Russia) Maria Sharapova

Final
Q	(France) Alizé Cornet	2	2
4	(Serbia) Jelena Janković	6	6

=== Top half ===
==== Section 1 ====
First round
Q	(Czech Republic) K Zakopalová	4	2
Q	(Bulgaria) T Pironkova	6	6
Q	(Romania) M Niculescu	6	3	6
Q	(United States) J Craybas	4	6	4
WC	(Belarus) V Azarenka	6	6
19	(Austria) S Bammer	1	3
12	(Poland) A Radwańska	6	6
Q	(Uzbekistan) A Amanmuradova	3	0
Q	(Estonia) K Kanepi	4	6	0
WC	(Italy) R Vinci	6	4	6
(Ukraine) K Bondarenko	7	6
(Italy) T Garbin	5	4

Second round
1	(Serbia) A Ivanovic	4	7	2
Q	(Bulgaria) T Pironkova	6	5	6
Q	(Romania) M Niculescu	3	2
WC	(Belarus) V Azarenka	6	6
12	(Poland) A Radwańska	3	6	6
WC	(Italy) R Vinci	6	2	2
(Ukraine) K Bondarenko	6	6^{1}	0
6	(Russia) A Chakvetadze	3	7^{7}	6

Third round
Q	(Bulgaria) T Pironkova	6	1
WC	(Belarus) V Azarenka	2	0^{r}
12	(Poland) A Radwańska	4	6	1
6	(Russia) A Chakvetadze	6	1	6

Quarterfinals
Q	(Bulgaria) T Pironkova	2	6	1
6	(Russia) A Chakvetadze	6	3	6

==== Section 2 ====
First round
(Belarus) O Govortsova	4	6	6
(Italy) K Knapp	6	1	2
(Russia) V Dushevina	1	3
Q	(France) A Cornet	6	6
(Czech Republic) L Šafářová	4	5
17	(Italy) F Schiavone	6	7
11	(Hungary) Á Szávay	6	6
(China) Z Yan	1	1
Q	(China) S Peng	4	6	3
WC	(Italy) S Errani	6	1	6
WC	(Italy) M Santangelo	2	2
(Ukraine) A Bondarenko	6	6

Second round
3	(Russia) S Kuznetsova	6	6
(Belarus) O Govortsova	2	0
Q	(France) A Cornet	6	6
17	(Italy) F Schiavone	3	2
11	(Hungary) Á Szávay	0	3
WC	(Italy) S Errani	6	6
(Ukraine) A Bondarenko	2	0
5	(United States) S Williams	6	6

Third round
3	(Russia) S Kuznetsova	2	4
Q	(France) A Cornet	6	6
WC	(Italy) S Errani	4	3
5	(United States) S Williams	6	6

Quarterfinals
Q	(France) A Cornet	w/o
5	(United States) S Williams

=== Bottom half ===
==== Section 3 ====
First round
(Netherlands) M Krajicek	3	2
(Australia) S Stosur	6	6
Q	(Russia) E Vesnina	3	5
Q	(Czech Republic) I Benešová	6	7
(Japan) A Sugiyama	3	3
10	(Russia) V Zvonareva	6	6
18	(Russia) N Petrova	6	5	4
(Russia) M Kirilenko	3	7	6
(Spain) A Medina Garrigues	6	7
Q	(Russia) A Kleybanova	1	5
LL	(Ukraine) O Savchuk	7^{11}	3	1
(Italy) F Pennetta	6^{9}	6	6

Second round
7	(United States) V Williams	6	6
(Australia) S Stosur	4	1
Q	(Czech Republic) I Benešová	5	6	5
10	(Russia) V Zvonareva	7	4	7
(Russia) M Kirilenko	6	5	6
(Spain) A Medina Garrigues	3	7	2
(Italy) F Pennetta	1	4
4	(Serbia) J Janković	6	6

Third round
7	(United States) V Williams	7	6
10	(Russia) V Zvonareva	5	2
(Russia) M Kirilenko	1	1
4	(Serbia) J Janković	6	6

Quarterfinals
7	(United States) V Williams	7	2	3
4	(Serbia) J Janković	5	6	6

==== Section 4 ====
First round
(Spain) J Vakulenko	1	2
(France) V Razzano	6	6
LL	(Russia) A Rodionova	1	3
LL	(Spain) V Ruano Pascual	6	6
Q	(Ukraine) M Koryttseva	6	2	3
9	(Switzerland) P Schnyder	3	6	6
13	(Czech Republic) N Vaidišová	4	6	2
LL	(Russia) E Makarova	6	4	6
(Austria) T Paszek	3	0
(Denmark) C Wozniacki	6	6
(Slovakia) D Cibulková	7^{7}	6
(Argentina) G Dulko	6^{1}	4

Second round
8	(France) M Bartoli	6	7
(France) V Razzano	4	5
LL	(Spain) V Ruano Pascual	1	0
9	(Switzerland) P Schnyder	6	6
LL	(Russia) E Makarova	3	4
(Denmark) C Wozniacki	6	6
(Slovakia) D Cibulková	2	6	4
2	(Russia) M Sharapova	6	3	6

Third round
8	(France) M Bartoli	6	4	6^{7}
9	(Switzerland) P Schnyder	4	6	7^{9}
(Denmark) C Wozniacki	4	6^{3}
2	(Russia) M Sharapova	6	7^{7}

Quarterfinals
9	(Switzerland) P Schnyder	7^{7}	5	2
2	(Russia) M Sharapova	6^{3}	7	6

== Qualifying ==
=== Seeds ===
1. (France) Alizé Cornet (qualified)
2. (Russia) Elena Vesnina (qualified)
3. (France) Pauline Parmentier (first round)
4. (Czech Republic) Klára Zakopalová (qualified)
5. (Australia) Casey Dellacqua (first round)
6. (Estonia) Kaia Kanepi (qualified)
7. (Ukraine) Mariya Koryttseva (qualified)
8. (Russia) Alisa Kleybanova (qualified)
9. (Uzbekistan) Akgul Amanmuradova (qualified)
10. (United States) Jill Craybas (qualified)
11. (China) Peng Shuai (qualified)
12. (Bulgaria) Tsvetana Pironkova (qualified)
13. (Russia) Anastasia Rodionova (qualifying competition, lucky loser)
14. (Switzerland) Timea Bacsinszky (first round)
15. (Spain) Virginia Ruano Pascual (qualifying competition, lucky loser)
16. (Russia) Ekaterina Makarova (qualifying competition, lucky loser)
17. (Poland) Marta Domachowska (first round)
18. (Ukraine) Olga Savchuk (qualifying competition, lucky loser)
19. (Czech Republic) Iveta Benešová (qualified)
20. (Spain) ~~Nuria Llagostera Vives~~ (Still competing in Berlin)
21. (Russia) Galina Voskoboeva (qualifying competition)
22. (Paraguay) Rossana de los Ríos (qualifying competition)
23. (Chinese Taipei) Chan Yung-jan (qualifying competition)
24. (France) Émilie Loit (first round)

=== Qualifiers ===
1. (France) Alizé Cornet
2. (Russia) Elena Vesnina
3. (Romania) Monica Niculescu
4. (Czech Republic) Klára Zakopalová
5. (Czech Republic) Iveta Benešová
6. (Estonia) Kaia Kanepi
7. (Ukraine) Mariya Koryttseva
8. (Russia) Alisa Kleybanova
9. (Uzbekistan) Akgul Amanmuradova
10. (United States) Jill Craybas
11. (China) Peng Shuai
12. (Bulgaria) Tsvetana Pironkova

=== Lucky losers ===
1. (Russia) Anastasia Rodionova
2. (Spain) Virginia Ruano Pascual
3. (Russia) Ekaterina Makarova
4. (Ukraine) Olga Savchuk

=== Qualifying draw ===
==== First qualifier ====
First round					Qualifying competition
1	(France) Alizé Cornet	7	6
	(China) Zhang Shuai	5	2		1	(France) Alizé Cornet	6	6
WC	(Italy) Nathalie Viérin	6	3	3	13	(Russia) Anastasia Rodionova	0	3
13	(Russia) Anastasia Rodionova	2	6	6

==== Second qualifier ====
First round				Qualifying competition
2	(Russia) Elena Vesnina	6	6
	(Russia) Alla Kudryavtseva	3	1	2	(Russia) Elena Vesnina	7^{7}	6
	(Slovenia) Andreja Klepač	6	7^{7}		(Slovenia) Andreja Klepač	6^{5}	3
17	(Poland) Marta Domachowska	3	6^{3}

==== Third qualifier ====
First round					Qualifying competition
3	(France) Pauline Parmentier	2	0
	(Romania) Monica Niculescu	6	6			(Romania) Monica Niculescu	3	6	6
WC	(Italy) Anna-Giulia Remondina	1	6	5	16	(Russia) Ekaterina Makarova	6	2	3
16	(Russia) Ekaterina Makarova	6	4	7

==== Fourth qualifier ====
First round					Qualifying competition
4	(Czech Republic) Klára Zakopalová	0	6	6
WC	(Italy) Corinna Dentoni	6	2	1	4	(Czech Republic) Klára Zakopalová	6	3	6
	(Japan) Ayumi Morita	6^{5}	3		21	(Russia) Galina Voskoboeva	1	6	2
21	(Russia) Galina Voskoboeva	7^{7}	6

==== Fifth qualifier ====
First round				Qualifying competition
5	(Australia) Casey Dellacqua	3	6^{5}
	(Ukraine) Yuliana Fedak	6	7^{7}		(Ukraine) Yuliana Fedak	1	2
	(United Kingdom) Katie O'Brien	4	3	19	(Czech Republic) Iveta Benešová	6	6
19	(Czech Republic) Iveta Benešová	6	6

==== Sixth qualifier ====
First round				Qualifying competition
6	(Estonia) Kaia Kanepi	6	6
	(Russia) Yaroslava Shvedova	2	2	6	(Estonia) Kaia Kanepi	6	7^{7}
	(Italy) Maria Elena Camerin	6	6		(Italy) Maria Elena Camerin	4	6^{3}
24	(France) Émilie Loit	0	2

==== Seventh qualifier ====
First round					Qualifying competition
7	(Ukraine) Mariya Koryttseva	6	6
	(Hungary) Kira Nagy	2	0		7	(Ukraine) Mariya Koryttseva	6	6
	(United States) Julie Ditty	2	7	6		(United States) Julie Ditty	2	4
Alt	(Russia) Regina Kulikova	6	5	3

==== Eighth qualifier ====
First round				Qualifying competition
8	(Russia) Alisa Kleybanova	6	6
Alt	(China) Zheng Jie	3	2	8	(Russia) Alisa Kleybanova	0	6	6
	(Australia) Alicia Molik	3	5	15	(Spain) Virginia Ruano Pascual	6	4	3
15	(Spain) Virginia Ruano Pascual	6	7

==== Ninth qualifier ====
First round					Qualifying competition
9	(Uzbekistan) Akgul Amanmuradova	6	6
WC	(Italy) Astrid Besser	1	1		9	(Uzbekistan) Akgul Amanmuradova	6	7^{7}
	(Switzerland) Emmanuelle Gagliardi	4	6	3	18	(Ukraine) Olga Savchuk	2	6^{4}
18	(Ukraine) Olga Savchuk	6	2	6

==== Tenth qualifier ====
First round					Qualifying competition
10	(United States) Jill Craybas	3	6	7^{7}
WC	(Italy) Camila Giorgi	6	2	6^{1}	10	(United States) Jill Craybas	7	6
	(Belarus) Tatiana Poutchek	4	4		22	(Paraguay) Rossana de los Ríos	5	1
22	(Paraguay) Rossana de los Ríos	6	6

==== Eleventh qualifier ====
First round				Qualifying competition
11	(China) Peng Shuai	6	6
	(China) Yuan Meng	1	2	11	(China) Peng Shuai	6	6
WC	(Italy) Giulia Gabba	3	1	23	(Chinese Taipei) Chan Yung-jan	3	4
23	(Chinese Taipei) Chan Yung-jan	6	6

==== Twelfth qualifier ====
First round					Qualifying competition
12	(Bulgaria) Tsvetana Pironkova	6	6
	(Russia) Evgeniya Rodina	3	1		12	(Bulgaria) Tsvetana Pironkova	6	6
	(Colombia) Catalina Castaño	5	6	6		(Colombia) Catalina Castaño	1	2
14	(Switzerland) Timea Bacsinszky	7	4	3
