= 2009 Italian Open – Women's singles =

Women's singles
- 2009 Italian Open

Final
- Champion: (Russia) Dinara Safina
- Runner-up: (Russia) Svetlana Kuznetsova
- Score: 6–3, 6–2

Details
- Draw: 56
- Seeds: 16

Events
Singles	men	women
Doubles	men	women
← 2008 ·	Italian Open	· 2010 →

Dinara Safina defeated Svetlana Kuznetsova in the final, 6–3, 6–2 to win the women's singles tennis title at the 2009 Italian Open.

Jelena Janković was the two-time defending champion, but lost in the quarterfinals to Kuznetsova.

== Seeds ==
The top eight seeds receive a bye into the second round.

1. (Russia) Dinara Safina (champion)
2. (United States) Serena Williams (second round)
3. (Serbia) Jelena Janković (quarterfinals)
4. (United States) Venus Williams (semifinals)
5. (Serbia) Ana Ivanovic (third round)
6. (Belarus) Victoria Azarenka (semifinals)
7. (Russia) Svetlana Kuznetsova (final)
8. (Russia) Nadia Petrova (third round)
9. (Denmark) Caroline Wozniacki (third round)
10. (Poland) Agnieszka Radwańska (quarterfinals)
11. (France) Marion Bartoli (second round)
12. (Italy) Flavia Pennetta (third round)
13. (France) Alizé Cornet (second round)
14. (China) Zheng Jie (third round)
15. (Spain) Anabel Medina Garrigues (first round)
16. (Estonia) Kaia Kanepi (quarterfinals)

== Draw ==
=== Key ===
- Q = Qualifier
- WC = Wild card
- LL = Lucky loser
- Alt = Alternate
- ITF = ITF entry
- PR = Protected ranking
- SR = Special ranking
- SE = Special exempt
- JE = Junior exempt
- JR = Junior Accelerator Programme entrant
- CO = College Accelerator Programme entrant
- NG = Next Gen Accelerator Program entrant
- w/o = Walkover
- r = Retired
- d = Defaulted

=== Finals ===
Quarterfinals
1	(Russia) Dinara Safina	4	6	6
(Spain) María José Martínez Sánchez	6	3	0
4	(United States) Venus Williams	6	6
10	(Poland) Agnieszka Radwańska	1	2
7	(Russia) Svetlana Kuznetsova	6	7
3	(Serbia) Jelena Janković	1	6^{3}
6	(Belarus) Victoria Azarenka	7	6
16	(Estonia) Kaia Kanepi	6^{5}	3

Semifinals
1	(Russia) Dinara Safina	6^{3}	6	6
4	(United States) Venus Williams	7	3	4
7	(Russia) Svetlana Kuznetsova	6	6
6	(Belarus) Victoria Azarenka	2	4

Final
1	(Russia) Dinara Safina	6	6
7	(Russia) Svetlana Kuznetsova	3	2

=== Top half ===
==== Section 1 ====
First round
(France) V Razzano	6	6^{8}	6
(Slovakia) M Rybáriková	0	7	4
(Russia) E Vesnina	1	6	6
Q	(United States) J Craybas	6	3	2
(France) N Dechy	1	6^{4}
14	(China) J Zheng	6	7
11	(France) M Bartoli	6	7
(China) S Peng	0	6^{3}
(France) A Mauresmo	6	6^{4}	2
(Spain) MJ Martínez Sánchez	4	7	6
(United Kingdom) A Keothavong	6^{5}	4
(Spain) C Suárez Navarro	7	6

Second round
1	(Russia) D Safina	7	6
(France) V Razzano	6^{1}	1
(Russia) E Vesnina	2	7	2
14	(China) J Zheng	6	6^{3}	6
11	(France) M Bartoli	1	5
(Spain) MJ Martínez Sánchez	6	7
(Spain) C Suárez Navarro	2	6	3
8	(Russia) N Petrova	6	3	6

Third round
1	(Russia) D Safina	5	6	7
14	(China) J Zheng	7	1	6^{3}
(Spain) MJ Martínez Sánchez	6	6^{5}	6
8	(Russia) N Petrova	4	7	4

Quarterfinals
1	(Russia) D Safina	4	6	6
(Spain) MJ Martínez Sánchez	6	3	0

==== Section 2 ====
First round
(Czech Republic) L Šafářová	7	6
Q	(Ukraine) M Koryttseva	6^{5}	2
(Canada) A Wozniak	6	3	6
(Italy) S Errani	1	6	4
(Russia) A Chakvetadze	6	6
15	(Spain) A Medina Garrigues	2	3
10	(Poland) A Radwańska	6	6
(Ukraine) A Bondarenko	0	1
(Russia) A Kleybanova	3	3
Q	(France) A Rezaï	6	6
(Italy) F Schiavone	6	6
Q	(Italy) A Brianti	3	4

Second round
4	(United States) V Williams	6	4	6
(Czech Republic) L Šafářová	2	6	2
(Canada) A Wozniak	7	6^{2}	3
(Russia) A Chakvetadze	5	7	6
10	(Poland) A Radwańska	4	6	7
Q	(France) A Rezaï	6	2	6^{7}
(Italy) F Schiavone	3	4
5	(Serbia) A Ivanovic	6	6

Third round
4	(United States) V Williams	6	6^{6}	6
(Russia) A Chakvetadze	0	7	4
10	(Poland) A Radwańska	6	3	6
5	(Serbia) A Ivanovic	1	6	4

Quarterfinals
4	(United States) V Williams	6	6
10	(Poland) A Radwańska	1	2

=== Bottom half ===
==== Section 3 ====
First round
(Russia) V Dushevina	4	1
(Slovakia) D Hantuchová	6	6
Q	(Kazakhstan) Y Shvedova	6	6
(Australia) S Stosur	4	2
(Bulgaria) T Pironkova	7	4	1
12	(Italy) F Pennetta	6^{2}	6	6
13	(France) A Cornet	6	7
(Japan) A Sugiyama	3	5
WC	(Italy) R Vinci	3	6^{4}
(Ukraine) K Bondarenko	6	7
WC	(Italy) K Knapp	2	3
(Argentina) G Dulko	6	6

Second round
7	(Russia) S Kuznetsova	6	6
(Slovakia) D Hantuchová	3	3
Q	(Kazakhstan) Y Shvedova	3	7	1
12	(Italy) F Pennetta	6	6^{5}	6
13	(France) A Cornet	4	1
(Ukraine) K Bondarenko	6	6
(Argentina) G Dulko	3	6^{6}
3	(Serbia) J Janković	6	7

Third round
7	(Russia) S Kuznetsova	6	3	6
12	(Italy) F Pennetta	3	6	0
(Ukraine) K Bondarenko	1	0	r
3	(Serbia) J Janković	6	1

Quarterfinals
7	(Russia) S Kuznetsova	6	7
3	(Serbia) J Janković	1	6^{3}

==== Section 4 ====
First round
(Romania) M Niculescu	1	3
Q	(Japan) A Morita	6	6
WC	(Italy) T Garbin	6	3	1
(United States) B Mattek-Sands	3	6	6
(Hungary) Á Szávay	3	2
9	(Denmark) C Wozniacki	6	6
16	(Estonia) K Kanepi	6	6
Q	(United States) V King	4	3
(Austria) S Bammer	7	4	6
(China) N Li	6^{3}	6	3
(Switzerland) P Schnyder	7	6
Q	(Colombia) M Duque Mariño	6^{1}	3

Second round
6	(Belarus) V Azarenka	6
Q	(Japan) A Morita	0	r
(United States) B Mattek-Sands	1	5
9	(Denmark) C Wozniacki	6	7
16	(Estonia) K Kanepi	7	6
(Austria) S Bammer	5	3
(Switzerland) P Schnyder	6	2	6
2	(United States) S Williams	2	6	1

Third round
6	(Belarus) V Azarenka	6	6
9	(Denmark) C Wozniacki	2	2
16	(Estonia) K Kanepi	6	6
(Switzerland) P Schnyder	3	0

Quarterfinals
6	(Belarus) V Azarenka	7	6
16	(Estonia) K Kanepi	6^{5}	3
