= 2009 Italian Open – Women's doubles =

Women's doubles
- 2009 Italian Open

Final
- Champions: (Chinese Taipei) Hsieh Su-wei (China) Peng Shuai
- Runners-up: (Slovakia) Daniela Hantuchová (Japan) Ai Sugiyama
- Score: 7–5, 7–6^{(7–5)}

Details
- Draw: 28
- Seeds: 8

Events
Singles	men	women
Doubles	men	women
← 2008 ·	Italian Open	· 2010 →

Chan Yung-jan and Chuang Chia-jung were the defending champions, but chose not to participate this year.

Hsieh Su-wei and Peng Shuai won in the final, beating Daniela Hantuchová and Ai Sugiyama 7–5, 7–6^{(7–5)}.

== Seeds ==
The top four seeds receive a bye into the second round.

1. (Zimbabwe) Cara Black / (United States) Liezel Huber (quarterfinals)
2. (Czech Republic) Květa Peschke / (United States) Lisa Raymond (quarterfinals)
3. (Australia) Samantha Stosur / (Australia) Rennae Stubbs (second round)
4. (Spain) Nuria Llagostera Vives / (Spain) María José Martínez Sánchez (semifinals)
5. (Slovakia) Daniela Hantuchová / (Japan) Ai Sugiyama (final)
6. (Spain) Virginia Ruano Pascual / (China) Zheng Jie (first round)
7. (Chinese Taipei) Hsieh Su-wei / (China) Peng Shuai (champions)
8. (Belarus) Victoria Azarenka / (Russia) Elena Vesnina (second round)

== Draw ==
=== Key ===
- Q = Qualifier
- WC = Wild card
- LL = Lucky loser
- Alt = Alternate
- ITF = ITF entry
- PR = Protected ranking
- SR = Special ranking
- SE = Special exempt
- JE = Junior exempt
- JR = Junior Accelerator Programme entrant
- CO = College Accelerator Programme entrant
- NG = Next Gen Accelerator Program entrant
- w/o = Walkover
- r = Retired
- d = Defaulted

=== Finals ===
Semifinals
5	(Slovakia) Daniela Hantuchová (Japan) Ai Sugiyama	6	6
4	(Spain) Nuria Llagostera Vives (Spain) María José Martínez Sánchez	4	3
7	(Chinese Taipei) Hsieh Su-wei (China) Peng Shuai	6	3	[10]
(Turkey) İpek Şenoğlu (Kazakhstan) Yaroslava Shvedova	4	6	[2]

Final
5	(Slovakia) Daniela Hantuchová (Japan) Ai Sugiyama	5	6^{5}
7	(Chinese Taipei) Hsieh Su-wei (China) Peng Shuai	7	7

=== Top half ===
First round
(Ukraine) A Bondarenko (Ukraine) K Bondarenko	4	7	[10]
(Italy) S Errani (Italy) K Knapp	6	6^{4}	[3]
(Italy) A Brianti (Italy) C Dentoni	6	6
ALT	(Bulgaria) M Gledacheva (Bulgaria) T Pironkova	4	1
(Slovakia) J Husárová (Denmark) C Wozniacki	6	4	[8]
5	(Slovakia) D Hantuchová (Japan) A Sugiyama	3	6	[10]
(Germany) A Bachmann (Germany) V Henke	4	0
(United States) J Craybas (United States) J Ditty	6	6
(Czech Republic) L Šafářová (Czech Republic) V Uhlířová	3	4
(Russia) N Petrova (Russia) D Safina	6	6
(Italy) T Garbin (Italy) R Vinci	2	2
8	(Belarus) V Azarenka (Russia) E Vesnina	6	6

Second round
1	(Zimbabwe) C Black (United States) L Huber	w/o
(Ukraine) A Bondarenko (Ukraine) K Bondarenko
(Italy) A Brianti (Italy) C Dentoni	1	2
5	(Slovakia) D Hantuchová (Japan) A Sugiyama	6	6
4	(Spain) N Llagostera Vives (Spain) MJ Martínez Sánchez	6	6
(United States) J Craybas (United States) J Ditty	1	1
(Russia) N Petrova (Russia) D Safina	7	5	[14]
8	(Belarus) V Azarenka (Russia) E Vesnina	6^{5}	7	[12]

Quarterfinals
1	(Zimbabwe) C Black (United States) L Huber	4	1
5	(Slovakia) D Hantuchová (Japan) A Sugiyama	6	6
4	(Spain) N Llagostera Vives (Spain) MJ Martínez Sánchez	w/o
(Russia) N Petrova (Russia) D Safina

Semifinals
5	(Slovakia) D Hantuchová (Japan) A Sugiyama	6	6
4	(Spain) N Llagostera Vives (Spain) MJ Martínez Sánchez	4	3

=== Bottom half ===
First round
7	(Chinese Taipei) S-w Hsieh (China) S Peng	7	7
(Ukraine) M Koryttseva (Belarus) T Poutchek	6^{5}	5
(France) N Dechy (Italy) M Santangelo	6	6
WC	(Italy) N Burnett (Italy) A Moroni	3	2
(Russia) V Dushevina (Kazakhstan) G Voskoboeva	6	6
(Russia) M Kondratieva (France) S Lefèvre	2	0
6	(Spain) V Ruano Pascual (China) J Zheng	6^{4}	5
(Turkey) İ Şenoğlu (Kazakhstan) Y Shvedova	7	7
WC	(Italy) S Chieppa (Italy) N Viérin	2	1
(Poland) A Radwańska (Hungary) Á Szávay	6	6
(Argentina) G Dulko (Italy) F Pennetta
(Poland) K Jans (Poland) A Rosolska	w/o

Second round
7	(Chinese Taipei) S-w Hsieh (China) S Peng	6	6
(France) N Dechy (Italy) M Santangelo	2	1
(Russia) V Dushevina (Kazakhstan) G Voskoboeva	6	6
3	(Australia) S Stosur (Australia) R Stubbs	3	1
(Turkey) İ Şenoğlu (Kazakhstan) Y Shvedova	w/o
(Poland) A Radwańska (Hungary) Á Szávay
(Poland) K Jans (Poland) A Rosolska	3	6^{4}
2	(Czech Republic) K Peschke (United States) L Raymond	6	7

Quarterfinals
7	(Chinese Taipei) S-w Hsieh (China) S Peng	6	6
(Russia) V Dushevina (Kazakhstan) G Voskoboeva	2	3
(Turkey) İ Şenoğlu (Kazakhstan) Y Shvedova	6	6
2	(Czech Republic) K Peschke (United States) L Raymond	2	4

Semifinals
7	(Chinese Taipei) S-w Hsieh (China) S Peng	6	3	[10]
(Turkey) İ Şenoğlu (Kazakhstan) Y Shvedova	4	6	[2]
