= 2008 Barcelona KIA – Doubles =

Doubles
- 2008 Barcelona KIA

Final
- Champions: (Spain) Lourdes Domínguez Lino (Spain) Arantxa Parra Santonja
- Runners-up: (Spain) Nuria Llagostera Vives (Spain) María José Martínez Sánchez
- Score: 4–6, 7–5, 10–4

Events
Singles	Doubles
← 2007 ·	Barcelona KIA	· 2009 →

Nuria Llagostera Vives and Arantxa Parra Santonja were the defending champions. They were both present but did not compete together.
Llagostera Vives partnered with María José Martínez Sánchez, but Parra Santonja and partner Lourdes Domínguez Lino defeated them 4–6, 7–5, 10–4, in the final.

== Seeds ==
1. (Spain) Nuria Llagostera Vives / (Spain) María José Martínez Sánchez (final)
2. (Czech Republic) Andrea Hlaváčková / (Poland) Klaudia Jans (semifinals)
3. (Spain) Lourdes Domínguez Lino / (Spain) Arantxa Parra Santonja (champions)
4. (Australia) Alicia Molik / (Spain) Carla Suárez Navarro (first round)

== Draw ==
=== Key ===
- Q = Qualifier
- WC = Wild card
- LL = Lucky loser
- Alt = Alternate
- SE = Special exempt
- PR = Protected ranking
- ITF = ITF entry
- JE = Junior exempt
- w/o = Walkover
- r = Retired
- d = Defaulted
- SR = Special ranking

=== Draw ===
First round
1	(Spain) N Llagostera Vives (Spain) MJ Martínez Sánchez	w/o
(Russia) M Kirilenko (Czech Republic) L Šafářová
(South Africa) K Anderson (United States) R Stephenson	7	6^{2}	[10]
(Czech Republic) V Chvojková (Serbia) A Jovanović	5	7	[8]
4	(Australia) A Molik (Spain) C Suárez Navarro	5	6	[6]
(Russia) A Jidkova (United States) L Osterloh	7	3	[10]
(Russia) N Bratchikova (Portugal) N Silva	2	2
(Slovakia) D Cibulková (Czech Republic) K Zakopalová	6	6
(Russia) M Kondratieva (France) S Lefèvre	7	6
(United States) C Fusano (Paraguay) R de los Ríos	6^{2}	4
(Spain) E Fernández-Brugués (France) L Thorpe	2	4
3	(Spain) L Domínguez Lino (Spain) A Parra Santonja	6	6
(Russia) E Ivanova (Czech Republic) M Melnikova	6	6
WC	(Spain) R Bou Nogueiro (Spain) M Gabarrús-Alonso	3	4
(Romania) E Gallovits (United States) V Lepchenko	3	1
2	(Czech Republic) A Hlaváčková (Poland) K Jans	6	6

Quarterfinals
1	(Spain) N Llagostera Vives (Spain) MJ Martínez Sánchez	7	6
(South Africa) K Anderson (United States) R Stephenson	5	1
(Russia) A Jidkova (United States) L Osterloh	w/o
(Slovakia) D Cibulková (Czech Republic) K Zakopalová
(Russia) M Kondratieva (France) S Lefèvre	1	2
3	(Spain) L Domínguez Lino (Spain) A Parra Santonja	6	6
(Russia) E Ivanova (Czech Republic) M Melnikova	2	2
2	(Czech Republic) A Hlaváčková (Poland) K Jans	6	6

Semifinals
1	(Spain) N Llagostera Vives (Spain) MJ Martínez Sánchez	6	7
(Russia) A Jidkova (United States) L Osterloh	1	5
3	(Spain) L Domínguez Lino (Spain) A Parra Santonja	6	6
2	(Czech Republic) A Hlaváčková (Poland) K Jans	3	4

Final
1	(Spain) N Llagostera Vives (Spain) MJ Martínez Sánchez	6	5	[4]
3	(Spain) L Domínguez Lino (Spain) A Parra Santonja	4	7	[10]
