= 2007 Barcelona KIA – Singles =

Singles
- 2007 Barcelona KIA

Final
- Champion: (United States) Meghann Shaughnessy
- Runner-up: (Romania) Edina Gallovits
- Score: 6–3, 6–2

Events
Singles	Doubles
← 2006 ·	Barcelona KIA	· 2008 →

The singles Tournament at the 2007 Barcelona KIA took place between 11 June and 17 June on outdoor clay courts in Barcelona, Catalonia, Spain. Meghann Shaughnessy won the title, defeating Edina Gallovits in the final.

== Seeds ==
1. (Italy) Francesca Schiavone (second round)
2. (Germany) Martina Müller (first round)
3. (France) Émilie Loit (quarterfinals)
4. (Estonia) Kaia Kanepi (quarterfinals)
5. (Spain) Lourdes Domínguez Lino (second round)
6. (United States) Meghann Shaughnessy (champion)
7. (France) Virginie Razzano (semifinals)
8. (Italy) Flavia Pennetta (semifinals)

== Draw ==
=== Key ===
- Q = Qualifier
- WC = Wild card
- LL = Lucky loser
- Alt = Alternate
- ITF = ITF entry
- PR = Protected ranking
- SR = Special ranking
- SE = Special exempt
- JE = Junior exempt
- JR = Junior Accelerator Programme entrant
- CO = College Accelerator Programme entrant
- NG = Next Gen Accelerator Program entrant
- w/o = Walkover
- r = Retired
- d = Defaulted

=== Finals ===
Quarterfinals
Q	(Hungary) Á. Szávay	6^{3}	4
6	(United States) M. Shaughnessy	7^{7}	6
3	(France) É. Loit	3	3
8	(Italy) F. Pennetta	6	6
(Romania) E. Gallovits	6	7
4	(Estonia) K. Kanepi	4	5
7	(France) V. Razzano	6	6
(Russia) A. Kudryavtseva	1	4

Semifinals
6	(United States) M. Shaughnessy	6	4	6
8	(Italy) F. Pennetta	0	6	4
(Romania) E. Gallovits	6	6
7	(France) V. Razzano	3	4

Finals
6	(United States) M. Shaughnessy	6	6
(Romania) E. Gallovits	3	2

=== Top half ===
==== Section 1 ====
First round
1	(Italy) F. Schiavone	6	0
(Italy) R. Oprandi	2	0^{r}
Q	(Hungary) Á. Szávay	6	7
(Belarus) T. Poutchek	3	5
WC	(Spain) L. Pous Tió	6	7^{7}
(Germany) S. Kloesel	3	6^{5}
WC	(Spain) N. Llagostera Vives	3	4
6	(United States) M. Shaughnessy	6	6

Second round
1	(Italy) F. Schiavone	1	1
Q	(Hungary) Á. Szávay	6	6
WC	(Spain) L. Pous Tió	5	4
6	(United States) M. Shaughnessy	7	6

Quarterfinals
Q	(Hungary) Á. Szávay	6^{3}	4
6	(United States) M. Shaughnessy	7^{7}	6

==== Section 2 ====
First round
3	(France) É. Loit	7	6
(Switzerland) T. Bacsinszky	5	3
(Croatia) J. Kostanić Tošić	1	1
(France) C. Pin	6	6
(Germany) T. Malek	5
(Czech Republic) I. Benešová	2^{r}
WC	(Spain) C. Martínez Granados	2	3
8	(Italy) F. Pennetta	6	6

Second round
3	(France) É. Loit	6	6
(France) C. Pin	1	1
(Germany) T. Malek	3	4
8	(Italy) F. Pennetta	6	6

Quarterfinals
3	(France) É. Loit	3	3
8	(Italy) F. Pennetta	6	6

=== Bottom half ===
==== Section 3 ====
First round
5	(Spain) L. Domínguez Lino	6	6
Q	(Germany) G. Arn	2	4
(Spain) V. Ruano Pascual	6	3	4
(Romania) E. Gallovits	4	6	6
Q	(Argentina) M. E. Salerni	6	7
Q	(Belarus) E. Dzehalevich	3	5
(Italy) K. Knapp	2	6^{7}
4	(Estonia) K. Kanepi	6	7^{9}

Second round
5	(Spain) L. Domingueez Lino	4	2
(Romania) E. Gallovits	6	6
(Argentina) M. E. Salerni	3	0
4	(Estonia) K. Kanepi	6	6

Quarterfinals
(Romania) E. Gallovits	6	7
4	(Estonia) K. Kanepi	4	5

==== Section 4 ====
First round
7	(France) V. Razzano	7^{8}	3	6
(Germany) J. Schruff	6^{6}	7	0
(Colombia) C. Castaño	2	3
(Hungary) M. Czink	6	6
(Switzerland) E. Gagliardi	6	4	7
(Ukraine) T. Perebiynis	3	6	5
(Russia) A. Kudryavtseva	6	6
2	(Germany) M. Müller	3	4

Second round
7	(France) V. Razzano	7^{7}	3	6
(Hungary) M. Czink	6^{5}	6	2
(Switzerland) E. Gagliardi	0	4
(Russia) A. Kudryavtseva	6	6

Quarterfinals
7	(France) V. Razzano	6	6
(Russia) A. Kudryavtseva	1	4

== Qualifying ==
The four qualifiers were:

- (Hungary) Ágnes Szávay
- (Germany) Gréta Arn
- (Belarus) Ekaterina Dzehalevich
- (Argentina) María Emilia Salerni

=== Seeds ===
The seeded players are listed below. Players in bold have qualified. The players no longer in the tournament are listed with the round in which they exited.

1. (Hungary) **Ágnes Szávay**
2. (Germany) **Gréta Arn**
3. (Italy) Sara Errani (qualifying)
4. (Georgia (country)) Margalita Chakhnashvili (second round)
5. (Argentina) **María Emilia Salerni**
6. (Russia) Ekaterina Ivanova (qualifying)
7. (Belarus) **Ekaterina Dzehalevich**
8. (Australia) Monique Adamczak (first round/Retired)

=== First qualifier ===
First round
1	**(Hungary) Á. Szávay**	**6**	**6**
(Slovenia) A. Poglajen	0	0
**(Romania) M. Niculescu**	**6**	**6**
(Belgium) D. Feys	4	4
WC	**(Spain) R. Bou Nogueiro**	**6**	**6**
(Poland) A. Rosolska	2	3
WC	**(Spain) M. Marrero**	3	**6**	3
8	(Australia) M. Adamczak	**6**	0	0 ret.

Second round
1	**(Hungary) Á. Szávay**	**7**	**6**
(Romania) M. Niculescu	5	4
WC	(Spain) R. Bou Nogueiro	**6**	4	4
WC	**(Spain) M. Marrero**	2	**6**	**6**

Qualifying
1	**(Hungary) Á. Szávay**	**6**	0
WC	(Spain) M. Marrero	4	0^{r}

=== Second qualifier ===
First round
2	**(Germany) G. Arn**	**6**	**6**
(Spain) E. Fernandez Brugues	3	0
(Ukraine) K. Polunina	3	2
**(Romania) M. Mihalche**	**6**	**6**
**(Portugal) N. Silva**	**6**	**6**
WC	(Spain) S. Soler Espinosa	4	2
(South Africa) L. Marshall	0	0
6	**(Russia) E. Ivanova**	**6**	**6**

Second round
2	**(Germany) G. Arn**	**6**	**7**
(Romania) M. Mihalche	1	5
(Portugal) N. Silva	2	4
6	**(Russia) E. Ivanova**	**6**	**6**

Qualifying
2	**(Germany) G. Arn**	**6**	**6**
6	(Russia) E. Ivanova	4	3

=== Third qualifier ===
First round
3	**(Italy) S. Errani**	**6**	**6**
(Croatia) G. Doz	0	3
**(Italy) S. Chieppa**	**6**	**6**
WC	(Spain) I. Ferrer Suárez	1	2
(United States) N. Uberoi	1	0^{r}
**(United States) C. Fusano**	**6**	1
(Spain) E. Cabeza Candela	**6**	3	0
7	**(Belarus) E. Dzehalevich**	4	**6**	**6**

Second round
3	**(Italy) S. Errani**	**6**	**7^{9}**
(Italy) S. Chieppa	3	6^{7}
(United States) C. Fusano	3	3
7	**(Belarus) E. Dzehalevich**	**6**	**6**

Qualifying
3	(Italy) S. Errani	1	0
7	**(Belarus) E. Dzehalevich**	**6**	**6**

=== Fourth qualifier ===
First round
4	**(Georgia (country)) M. Chakhnashvili**	**6**	**6**
(Bulgaria) B. Pavlova	4	0
**(Russia) E. Afinogenova**	**6**	4	**6**
(Germany) C. Klaschka	1	**6**	2
**(Spain) A. Parra Santonja**	**6**	**6**
(Germany) A. Schaefer	1	2
(Spain) N. Sánchez García	3	2
5	**(Argentina) M. Salerni**	**6**	**6**

Second round
4	(Georgia (country)) M. Chakhnashvili	2	2
**(Russia) E. Afinogenova**	**6**	**6**
(Spain) A. Parra Santonja	2	4
5	**(Argentina) M. Salerni**	**6**	**6**

Qualifying
(Russia) E. Afinogenova	1	0
5	**(Argentina) M. Salerni**	**6**	**6**
