= 2008 Barcelona KIA – Singles =

Singles
- 2008 Barcelona KIA

Final
- Champion: (Russia) Maria Kirilenko
- Runner-up: (Spain) María José Martínez Sánchez
- Score: 6–0, 6–2

Details
- Draw: 32
- Seeds: 8

Events
Singles	Doubles
← 2007 ·	Barcelona KIA	· 2009 →

Meghann Shaughnessy was the defending champion, but chose not to participate that year.

Maria Kirilenko won in the final 6–0, 6–2, against María José Martínez Sánchez.

== Seeds ==
1. (Israel) Shahar Pe'er (first round)
2. (Russia) Maria Kirilenko (champion)
3. (Slovakia) Dominika Cibulková (first round, retired due to an abdominal strain)
4. (Czech Republic) Lucie Šafářová (quarterfinals, retired due to a shoulder injury)
5. (France) Pauline Parmentier (second round)
6. (Italy) Sara Errani (quarterfinals)
7. (Czech Republic) Klára Zakopalová (second round)
8. (Italy) Tathiana Garbin (first round)

== Draw ==
=== Key ===
- Q = Qualifier
- WC = Wild card
- LL = Lucky loser
- Alt = Alternate
- SE = Special exempt
- PR = Protected ranking
- ITF = ITF entry
- JE = Junior exempt
- w/o = Walkover
- r = Retired
- d = Defaulted
- SR = Special ranking

=== Finals ===
Semifinals
(Spain) Nuria Llagostera Vives	6	3	1
WC	(Spain) María José Martínez Sánchez	2	6	6
(France) Stéphanie Cohen-Aloro	5	3
2	(Russia) Maria Kirilenko	7	6

Final
WC	(Spain) María José Martínez Sánchez	0	2
2	(Russia) Maria Kirilenko	6	6

=== Top half ===
First round
1	(Israel) S Pe'er	5	2
(Spain) N Llagostera Vives	7	6
(France) É Loit	7	4	6^{5}
WC	(Spain) E Compostizo de Andrés	6^{4}	6	7
(Paraguay) R de los Ríos	5	2
(United States) V Lepchenko	7	6
(Spain) L Domínguez Lino	3	2
6	(Italy) S Errani	6	6
4	(Czech Republic) L Šafářová	6	6
Q	(Spain) L Costas	2	1
Q	(Spain) M Gabarrús-Alonso	1	3
WC	(Spain) A Parra Santonja	6	6
(Canada) A Wozniak	4	1
WC	(Spain) MJ Martínez Sánchez	6	6
PR	(Croatia) S Mamić	2	6	2
5	(France) P Parmentier	6	3	6

Second round
(Spain) N Llagostera Vives	6	6
WC	(Spain) E Compostizo de Andrés	3	0
(United States) V Lepchenko	4	5
6	(Italy) S Errani	6	7
4	(Czech Republic) L Šafářová	7	4	6
WC	(Spain) A Parra Santonja	5	6	3
WC	(Spain) MJ Martínez Sánchez	6	6
5	(France) P Parmentier	2	4

Quarterfinals
(Spain) N Llagostera Vives	2	6	6
6	(Italy) S Errani	6	2	3
4	(Czech Republic) L Šafářová	2	1	r
WC	(Spain) MJ Martínez Sánchez	6	4

Semifinals
(Spain) N Llagostera Vives	6	3	1
WC	(Spain) MJ Martínez Sánchez	2	6	6

=== Bottom half ===
First round
8	(Italy) T Garbin	6	5	3
Q	(Russia) E Ivanova	4	7	6
(Colombia) C Castaño	6^{7}	6	0
Q	(Russia) M Kondratieva	7	4	6
(Slovakia) M Rybáriková	6	6
(Italy) ME Camerin	1	2
(France) S Cohen-Aloro	6
3	(Slovakia) D Cibulková	5	r
7	(Czech Republic) K Zakopalová	2	7	6
(Croatia) K Šprem	6	6^{3}	2
(Romania) E Gallovits	6	0	6
(Ukraine) J Vakulenko	2	6	3
(Spain) C Suárez Navarro	6	6
(Australia) A Molik	2	4
(United States) L Osterloh	0	0	r
2	(Russia) M Kirilenko	6	2

Second round
Q	(Russia) E Ivanova	1	6	7
Q	(Russia) M Kondratieva	6	1	5
(Slovakia) M Rybáriková	6^{3}	0
(France) S Cohen-Aloro	7	6
7	(Czech Republic) K Zakopalová	2	0
(Romania) E Gallovits	6	6
(Spain) C Suárez Navarro	1	6	4
2	(Russia) M Kirilenko	6	4	6

Quarterfinals
Q	(Russia) E Ivanova	2	1
(France) S Cohen-Aloro	6	6
(Romania) E Gallovits	6^{3}	1
2	(Russia) M Kirilenko	7	6

Semifinals
(France) S Cohen-Aloro	5	3
2	(Russia) M Kirilenko	7	6
