= 2009 Barcelona Ladies Open – Singles =

Singles
- 2009 Barcelona Ladies Open

Final
- Champion: (Italy) Roberta Vinci
- Runner-up: (Russia) Maria Kirilenko
- Score: 6–0, 6–4

Details
- Draw: 32
- Seeds: 8

Events
Singles	Doubles
- Barcelona Ladies Open

Maria Kirilenko was the defending champion, but she was defeated in the final by Roberta Vinci, 6–0, 6–4.

== Seeds ==
1. (France) Alizé Cornet (first round)
2. (Italy) Flavia Pennetta (second round)
3. (Spain) Anabel Medina Garrigues (withdrew)
4. (Estonia) Kaia Kanepi (first round)
5. (Spain) Carla Suárez Navarro (semifinals)
6. (Russia) Maria Kirilenko (final)
7. (Italy) Sara Errani (second round)
8. (Romania) Sorana Cîrstea (first round)

== Draw ==
Key

- Q = Qualifier
- WC = Wild card
- LL = Lucky loser
- Alt = Alternate
- ITF = ITF entry
- PR = Protected ranking
- SR = Special ranking
- SE = Special exempt
- JE = Junior exempt
- JR = Junior Accelerator Programme entrant
- CO = College Accelerator Programme entrant
- NG = Next Gen Accelerator Program entrant
- w/o = Walkover
- r = Retired
- d = Defaulted

=== Finals ===
Semifinals
5	(Spain) Carla Suárez Navarro	6	1	2
6	(Russia) Maria Kirilenko	4	6	6
(Italy) Francesca Schiavone	6	6^{2}	4
(Italy) Roberta Vinci	0	7	6

Final
6	(Russia) Maria Kirilenko	0	4
(Italy) Roberta Vinci	6	6

=== Top half ===
First round
1	(France) A Cornet	0	3
(France) S Cohen-Aloro	6	6
Q	(Germany) T Malek	6	3	6
WC	(Spain) N Llagostera Vives	3	6	1
Q	(Bosnia and Herzegovina) M Jugić-Salkić	6^{3}	6	2
LL	(France) É Loit	7	3	6
WC	(Spain) E Cabeza Candela	2	0
5	(Spain) C Suárez Navarro	6	6
4	(Estonia) K Kanepi	6	2	4
LL	(Slovenia) M Zec Peškirič	3	6	6
(Spain) MJ Martínez Sánchez	6	6
(Belgium) K Flipkens	2	2
(Germany) A-L Grönefeld	6^{4}	2
(France) S Bremond	7	6
(France) C Pin	2	0
6	(Russia) M Kirilenko	6	6

Second round
(France) S Cohen-Aloro	0	r
Q	(Germany) T Malek	5
LL	(France) É Loit	2	5
5	(Spain) C Suárez Navarro	6	7
LL	(Slovenia) M Zec Peškirič	5	7	2
(Spain) MJ Martínez Sánchez	7	5	6
(France) S Bremond	5	2
6	(Russia) M Kirilenko	7	6

Quarterfinals
Q	(Germany) T Malek	4	0
5	(Spain) C Suárez Navarro	6	6
(Spain) MJ Martínez Sánchez	1	6	0
6	(Russia) M Kirilenko	6	3	6

Semifinals
5	(Spain) C Suárez Navarro	6	1	2
6	(Russia) M Kirilenko	4	6	6

=== Bottom half ===
First round
7	(Italy) S Errani	2	7	6
(France) M Johansson	6	5	3
(Bulgaria) T Pironkova	1	6	0
(Czech Republic) L Šafářová	6	3	6
(Italy) F Schiavone	7	6
(Spain) L Domínguez Lino	6^{4}	4
(Czech Republic) N Vaidišová	6	6
Q	(Ukraine) Y Savranska	2	4
8	(Romania) S Cîrstea	6^{2}	6^{5}
Q	(Belarus) A Yakimova	7	7
(Slovakia) M Rybáriková	6	7
(Czech Republic) K Zakopalová	1	6^{7}
(Italy) R Vinci	6	7
(France) P Parmentier	4	6^{7}
(Czech Republic) P Kvitová	3	3
2/WC	(Italy) F Pennetta	6	6

Second round
7	(Italy) S Errani	3	3
(Czech Republic) L Šafářová	6	6
(Italy) F Schiavone	6	6
(Czech Republic) N Vaidišová	2	3
Q	(Belarus) A Yakimova	3	6	6
(Slovakia) M Rybáriková	6	3	0
(Italy) R Vinci	6	6
2/WC	(Italy) F Pennetta	1	2

Quarterfinals
(Czech Republic) L Šafářová	3	5
(Italy) F Schiavone	6	7
Q	(Belarus) A Yakimova	3	3
(Italy) R Vinci	6	6

Semifinals
(Italy) F Schiavone	6	6^{2}	4
(Italy) R Vinci	0	7	6
