= 2007 Barcelona KIA – Doubles =

Tennis tournament

Doubles
- 2007 Barcelona KIA

Final
- Champions: (Spain) Nuria Llagostera Vives (Spain) Arantxa Parra Santonja
- Runners-up: (Spain) Lourdes Domínguez Lino (Italy) Flavia Pennetta
- Score: 7–6^{(7–3)}, 2–6, [12–10]

Events
Singles	Doubles
← 2006 ·	Barcelona KIA	· 2008 →

The women's doubles Tournament at the 2007 Barcelona KIA took place between 11 June and 17 June on outdoor clay courts in Barcelona, Spain. Nuria Llagostera Vives and Arantxa Parra Santonja won the title, defeating Lourdes Domínguez Lino and Flavia Pennetta in the final.

== Seeds ==
1. (Croatia) Jelena Kostanić Tošić / (Ukraine) Tatiana Perebiynis (first round)
2. (Spain) Lourdes Domínguez Lino / (Italy) Flavia Pennetta (final)
3. (Germany) Martina Müller / (Czech Republic) Gabriela Navrátilová (semifinals)
4. (Ukraine) Mariya Koryttseva / (Poland) Alicja Rosolska (first round)

== Draw ==
=== Key ===
- Q = Qualifier
- WC = Wild card
- LL = Lucky loser
- Alt = Alternate
- SE = Special exempt
- PR = Protected ranking
- ITF = ITF entry
- JE = Junior exempt
- w/o = Walkover
- r = Retired
- d = Defaulted
- SR = Special ranking

First round
1	(Croatia) J. Kostanić Tošić (Ukraine) T. Perebiynis	4	4
(Paraguay) R. de los Ríos (Romania) E. Gallovits	6	6
(Russia) A. Jidkova (Spain) C. Martínez Granados	6	6
(Germany) S. Klösel (Germany) T. Malek	3	2
4	(Ukraine) M. Koryttseva (Poland) A. Rosolska	6^{5}	2
(Spain) N. Llagostera Vives (Spain) A. Parra Santonja	7^{7}	6
(Russia) E. Afinogenova (Belarus) E. Dzehalevich	6	6
(Spain) N. Sánchez García (Portugal) N. Silva	4	4
(United States) C. Fusano (Australia) C. Horiatopoulos	3	6^{2}
WC	(Spain) L. Pous Tió (Spain) C. Suárez Navarro	6	7^{7}
(Hungary) M. Czink (Turkey) İ. Şenoğlu	6	4	[10]
3	(Germany) M. Müller (Czech Republic) G. Navrátilová	3	6	[12]
(Georgia (country)) M. Chakhnashvili (Russia) E. Ivanova	2	1
(Romania) M. Niculescu (United States) N. Uberoi	6	6
(Latvia) L. Dekmeijere (Germany) J. Schruff	4	2
2	(Spain) L. Domínguez Lino (Italy) F. Pennetta	6	6

Quarterfinals
(Paraguay) R. de los Ríos (Romania) E. Gallovits	2	6	[4]
(Russia) A. Jidkova (Spain) C. Martínez Granados	6	1	[10]
(Spain) N. Llagostera Vives (Spain) A. Parra Santonja	6	6
(Russia) E. Afinogenova (Belarus) E. Dzehalevich	3	2
WC	(Spain) L. Pous Tió (Spain) C. Suárez Navarro	4	5
3	(Germany) M. Müller (Czech Republic) G. Navrátilová	6	7
(Romania) M. Niculescu (United States) N. Uberoi	6	3	[4]
2	(Spain) L. Domínguez Lino (Italy) F. Pennetta	3	6	[10]

Semifinals
(Russia) A. Jidkova (Spain) C. Martínez Granados	3	5
(Spain) N. Llagostera Vives (Spain) A. Parra Santonja	6	7
3	(Germany) M. Müller (Czech Republic) G. Navrátilová	1	2
2	(Spain) L. Domínguez Lino (Italy) F. Pennetta	6	6

Finals
(Spain) N. Llagostera Vives (Spain) A. Parra Santonja	7^{7}	2	[12]
2	(Spain) L. Domínguez Lino (Italy) F. Pennetta	6^{3}	6	[10]
