= 2012 Barcelona Ladies Open =

- Date: 9-15 April
- Edition: 6th
- Category: WTA International tournaments
- Surface: Clay / Outdoor
- Location: Barcelona, Catalonia, Spain

Champions

Singles
- (Italy) Sara Errani

Doubles
- (Italy) Sara Errani / (Italy) Roberta Vinci
← 2011 ·	Barcelona Ladies Open

The 2012 Barcelona Ladies Open was a women's tennis tournament played on outdoor clay courts. It was the 6th edition of the Barcelona Ladies Open, and an International-level tournament on the 2012 WTA Tour. The tournament took place at the Centre Municipal Tennis Vall d'Hebron in Barcelona, Catalonia, Spain between April 9 and 15, 2012. Sara Errani won the singles title.

== Singles main draw entrants ==
=== Seeds ===
Country	Player	Rank^{1}	Seed
ITA	Francesca Schiavone	12	1
GER	Julia Görges	15	2
SVK	Dominika Cibulková	18	3
ITA	Roberta Vinci	19	4
ITA	Flavia Pennetta	24	5
CZE	Petra Cetkovská	28	6
ITA	Sara Errani	31	7
SLO	Polona Hercog	37	8

- Rankings are as of April 2, 2012

=== Other entrants ===
The following players received wildcards into the main draw:

- (Spain) Garbiñe Muguruza Blanco
- (Spain) Arantxa Parra Santonja
- (Italy) Flavia Pennetta
- (Italy) Francesca Schiavone

The following players received entry from the qualifying draw:

- (Ukraine) Yuliya Beygelzimer
- (Italy) Annalisa Bona
- (France) Aravane Rezaï
- (France) Laura Thorpe

The following player received entry as a lucky loser:

- (Spain) Estrella Cabeza Candela

=== Withdrawals ===
- (United Kingdom) Elena Baltacha (right foot injury)
- (Spain) María José Martínez Sánchez (right thigh injury)

=== Retirements ===
- (Slovenia) Polona Hercog (dizziness)

== Doubles main draw entrants ==
=== Seeds ===
Country	Player	Country	Player	Rank^{1}	Seed
ITA	Sara Errani	ITA	Roberta Vinci	25	1
ESP	Nuria Llagostera Vives	ESP	Arantxa Parra Santonja	41	2
BLR	Olga Govortsova	CZE	Vladimíra Uhlířová	82	3
RUS	Nina Bratchikova	CRO	Darija Jurak	137	4

- ^{1} Rankings are as of April 2, 2012

=== Other entrants ===
The following pairs received wildcards into the doubles main draw:

- (Spain) Estrella Cabeza Candela / (Spain) Inés Ferrer Suárez
- (Spain) Silvia Soler Espinosa / (Spain) Carla Suárez Navarro

== Champions ==
=== Singles ===
- (Italy) Sara Errani defeated (Slovakia) Dominika Cibulková 6–2, 6–2
- It was Errani's 2nd title of the year and 4th of her career.

=== Doubles ===
- (Italy) Sara Errani / (Italy) Roberta Vinci defeated (Italy) Flavia Pennetta / (Italy) Francesca Schiavone, 6–0, 6–2
