= 2008 Barcelona KIA =

- Date: 9 – 15 June
- Edition: 2nd
- Category: Tier IV Series
- Draw: 32S / 16D
- Surface: Clay / outdoor
- Location: Barcelona, Spain

Champions

Singles
- (Russia) Maria Kirilenko

Doubles
- (Spain) Lourdes Domínguez Lino / (Spain) Arantxa Parra Santonja
← 2007 ·	Barcelona KIA	· 2009 →

The 2008 Barcelona KIA was a women's tennis tournament played on outdoor clay courts. It was the second edition of the Barcelona KIA, and was part of the Tier IV Series of the 2008 WTA Tour. It took place at the David Lloyd Club Turó in Barcelona, Spain, from 9 June through 15 June 2008. Second-seeded Maria Kirilenko won the singles title.

== Finals ==
=== Singles ===
(Russia) Maria Kirilenko defeated (Spain) María José Martínez Sánchez, 6–0, 6–2

- It was Kirilenko's 2nd title of the year, and her 4th overall.

=== Doubles ===
(Spain) Lourdes Domínguez Lino / (Spain) Arantxa Parra Santonja defeated (Spain) Nuria Llagostera Vives / (Spain) María José Martínez Sánchez, 4–6, 7–5, 10–4
