= 2009 Barcelona Ladies Open – Doubles =

Doubles
- 2009 Barcelona Ladies Open

Final
- Champions: (Spain) Nuria Llagostera Vives (Spain) María José Martínez Sánchez
- Runners-up: (Romania) Sorana Cîrstea (Slovenia) Andreja Klepač
- Score: 3–6, 6–2, 10–8

Details
- Draw: 16
- Seeds: 4

Events
Singles	Doubles
- Barcelona Ladies Open

Lourdes Domínguez Lino and Arantxa Parra Santonja were the defending champions, but lost in the first round to Nuria Llagostera Vives and María José Martínez Sánchez.

== Seeds ==
1. (Spain) Nuria Llagostera Vives / (Spain) María José Martínez Sánchez (champions)
2. (Germany) Anna-Lena Grönefeld / (Turkey) İpek Şenoğlu (first round)
3. (Poland) Klaudia Jans / (Poland) Alicja Rosolska (quarterfinals)
4. (Czech Republic) Andrea Hlaváčková / (Czech Republic) Lucie Hradecká (semifinals)

== Draw ==
Key

- Q = Qualifier
- WC = Wild card
- LL = Lucky loser
- Alt = Alternate
- ITF = ITF entry
- PR = Protected ranking
- SR = Special ranking
- SE = Special exempt
- JE = Junior exempt
- JR = Junior Accelerator Programme entrant
- CO = College Accelerator Programme entrant
- NG = Next Gen Accelerator Program entrant
- w/o = Walkover
- r = Retired
- d = Defaulted

=== Finals ===
First round
1	(Spain) N Llagostera Vives (Spain) MJ Martínez Sánchez	6	4	[10]
(Spain) L Domínguez Lino (Spain) A Parra Santonja	1	6	[7]
WC	(Italy) S Errani (Spain) C Suárez Navarro	6	6
(Belarus) E Dzehalevich (Belarus) A Yakimova	1	2
3	(Poland) K Jans (Poland) A Rosolska	6	6
(United Kingdom) S Borwell (South Africa) N Grandin	4	3
(Russia) M Kondratieva (France) S Lefèvre	1	6	[6]
(Italy) F Schiavone (Italy) R Vinci	6	4	[10]
(France) S Brémond (Ukraine) V Kapshay	6	4	[10]
(France) A Cornet (France) C Pin	0	6	[8]
(Ukraine) Y Beygelzimer (Bosnia and Herzegovina) M Jugić-Salkić	0	1
4	(Czech Republic) A Hlaváčková (Czech Republic) L Hradecká	6	6
(Estonia) M Ani (Czech Republic) R Voráčová	6	7
(Czech Republic) L Šafářová (Czech Republic) V Uhlířová	3	5
(Romania) S Cîrstea (Slovenia) A Klepač	2	6	[10]
2	(Germany) A-L Grönefeld (Turkey) İ Şenoğlu	6	4	[4]

Quarterfinals
1	(Spain) N Llagostera Vives (Spain) MJ Martínez Sánchez	7	6
WC	(Italy) S Errani (Spain) C Suárez Navarro	6^{5}	0
3	(Poland) K Jans (Poland) A Rosolska	2	6	[8]
(Italy) F Schiavone (Italy) R Vinci	6	2	[10]
(France) S Brémond (Ukraine) V Kapshay	3	1	r
4	(Czech Republic) A Hlaváčková (Czech Republic) L Hradecká	6	0
(Estonia) M Ani (Czech Republic) R Voráčová	4	3
(Romania) S Cîrstea (Slovenia) A Klepač	6	6

Semifinals
1	(Spain) N Llagostera Vives (Spain) MJ Martínez Sánchez	6	6
(Italy) F Schiavone (Italy) R Vinci	1	1
4	(Czech Republic) A Hlaváčková (Czech Republic) L Hradecká	6^{6}	3
(Romania) S Cîrstea (Slovenia) A Klepač	7	6

Final
1	(Spain) N Llagostera Vives (Spain) MJ Martínez Sánchez	3	6	[10]
(Romania) S Cîrstea (Slovenia) A Klepač	6	2	[8]
