= Eloisa Compostizo de Andrés =

Spanish tennis player (born 1988)

- Full name: Eloisa Maria Compostizo de Andrés
- Country (sports): Spain
- Born: 8 August 1988 (age 38) Santander, Spain
- Turned pro: 2004
- Retired: 2010
- Plays: Left (two-handed backhand)
- Prize money: $75,002

Singles
- Career record: 170–131
- Career titles: 3 ITF
- Highest ranking: No. 199 (7 June 2010)

Grand Slam singles results
- Australian Open: Q1 (2010
- Wimbledon: Q1 (2010)
- US Open: Q2 (2009)

Doubles
- Career record: 6–29
- Highest ranking: No. 605 (18 August 2008)

Eloisa Compostizo de Andrés (born 8 August 1988) is a retired Spanish tennis player.

On 7 June 2010, she reached her highest WTA singles ranking of No. 199, while her best doubles ranking was 605 on 18 August 2008. In her career, she won three singles titles on the ITF Women's Circuit.

Compostizo de Andrés made her main-draw debut on the WTA Tour at the 2008 Barcelona KIA where she received a wildcard. There, after her first-round win against Émilie Loit, she lost to Nuria Llagostera Vives.

Compostizo de Andrés retired from professional tennis 2010.

== ITF finals ==
=== Singles (3–3) ===
Legend $25,000 tournaments $10,000 tournaments	Finals by surface Hard (0–0) Clay (3–3)

Result	No.	Date	Location	Surface	Opponent	Score
Loss	1	11 July 2004	Getxo, Spain	Clay	(Germany) Tatjana Priachin	3–6, 6–2, 1–6
Win	1	15 October 2006	Braga, Portugal	Clay	(Mauritius) Marinne Giraud	6–4, 5–7, 6–3
Loss	2	27 May 2007	Gorizia, Italy	Clay	(Czech Republic) Lucie Hradecká	2–6, 3–6
Win	2	7 February 2009	Mallorca, Spain	Clay	(Italy) Martina Caregaro	6–0, 6–7^{(5)}, 6–2
Win	3	18 July 2009	Rome, Italy	Clay	(Spain) Estrella Cabeza Candela	6–3, 6–7^{(2)}, 6–2
Loss	3	27 March 2010	Pomezia, Italy	Clay	(Italy) Martina Caregaro	1–6, 1–6
