= Annalisa Bona =

Italian tennis player

- Country (sports): Italy
- Born: 15 November 1982 (age 42) Genova, Italy
- Plays: Right (two-handed backhand)
- Prize money: $58,817

Singles
- Career record: 211–154
- Career titles: 2 ITF
- Highest ranking: No. 235 (14 May 2012)

Doubles
- Career record: 19–2019–20
- Career titles: 0
- Highest ranking: No. 756 (18 June 2012)

Annalisa Bona (born 15 November 1982) is an Italian former tennis player. On 14 May 2012, she reached her highest singles ranking by the Women's Tennis Association (WTA) of 235. In April 2012, she reached her first WTA Tour main draw at the Barcelona Ladies Open.

== ITF Circuit finals ==
$25,000 tournaments
$10,000 tournaments

=== Singles (2–8) ===
Result	W/L	Date	Tournament	Surface	Opponent	Score
Loss	1.	9 October 2005	Rome, Italy	Clay	(Poland) Anna Korzeniak	4–6, 2–6
Loss	2.	26 November 2006	Vallduxo, Spain	Clay	(Spain) Maite Gabarrús-Alonso	3–6, 6–3, 2–6
Loss	3.	12 April 2009	Šibenik, Croatia	Clay	(Italy) Evelyn Mayr	5–7, 6–7^{(3)}
Loss	4.	19 July 2010	Horb, Germany	Clay	(Slovakia) Michaela Hončová	4–6, 2–6
Loss	5.	2 August 2010	Rebecq, Belgium	Clay	(Belgium) Sofie Oyen	6–4, 6–7^{(5–7)}, 2–6
Win	6.	20 August 2010	Wanfercée-Baulet, Belgium	Clay	(Belgium) Nicky Van Dyck	6–0, 6–1
Win	7.	5 September 2010	Istanbul, Turkey	Hard	(Romania) Laura-Ioana Andrei	6–2, 6–2
Loss	8.	19 September 2010	Royal Cup, Montenegro	Clay	(Romania) Irina-Camelia Begu	1–6, 1–6
Loss	9.	4 April 2011	Pomezia, Italy	Clay	(Georgia (country)) Margalita Chakhnashvili	6–1, 2–6, 2–6
Loss	10.	10 July 2011	Craiova, Romania	Clay	(Romania) Mihaela Buzărnescu	2–6, 6–3, 4–6

=== Doubles (0–2) ===
Result	W/L	Date	Tournament	Surface	Partner	Opponents	Score
Loss	1.	19 September 2005	Ciampino, Italy	Clay	(Italy) Raffaella Bindi	(Slovakia) Lenka Broošová (Slovakia) Lenka Wienerová	4–6, 4–6
Loss	42.	6 May 2013	Pula, Italy	Clay	(Switzerland) Lisa Sabino	(Italy) Martina Caregaro (Italy) Anna Floris	2–6, 3–6
