= Rebeca Bou Nogueiro =

Spanish tennis player (born 1987)

- Country (sports): Spain
- Born: 7 March 1987 (age 38); Barcelona, Spain
- Plays: Right-handed
- Prize money: $39,128

Singles
- Career record: 130–102
- Career titles: 3 ITF
- Highest ranking: No. 327 (8 September 2008)

Doubles
- Career record: 40–57
- Career titles: 3 ITF
- Highest ranking: No. 375 (10 August 2009)

Rebeca Bou Nogueiro (born 7 March 1987) is a Spanish former professional tennis player.

Born in Barcelona, Bou made her only WTA Tour main draw appearance in her home city, as a doubles wildcard pairing with Maite Gabarrús-Alonso at the Barcelona Ladies Open.

Bou was ranked by the Women's Tennis Association (WTA) as high as 327 in singles and 375 in doubles.

== ITF Circuit finals ==
Legend
$25,000 tournaments
$10,000 tournaments

=== Singles (3–3) ===
Result	No.	Date	Tournament	Surface	Opponent	Score
Win	1.	11 March 2007	ITF Sabadell, Spain	Clay	(Russia) Anastasia Poltoratskaya	6–3, 6–2
Loss	1.	1 April 2007	ITF Foggia, Italy	Clay	(Brazil) Teliana Pereira	4–6, 3–6
Win	2.	3 June 2007	ITF Tortosa, Spain	Clay	(Spain) Valentina Sulpizio	7–5, 6–4
Win	3.	21 October 2007	ITF Seville, Spain	Clay	(Spain) Sandra Soler-Sola	7–6^{(5)}, 7–5
Loss	2.	31 August 2008	ITF Mollerusa, Spain	Hard	(Spain) Sandra Soler-Sola	4–6, 2–6
Loss	3.	19 July 2009	ITF Cáceres, Spain	Hard	(France) Estelle Guisard Diemer	3–6, 6–7^{(1)}

=== Doubles (3–4) ===
Result	No.	Date	Tournament	Surface	Partner	Opponents	Score
Loss	1.	4 September 2005	ITF Mollerusa, Spain	Hard	(Spain) Anna Boada-Plade Llorens	(Spain) Núria Roig (Brazil) Larissa Carvalho	0–6, 1–6
DNP	—	13 November 2005	ITF Mallorca, Spain	Clay	(Spain) Veronica Rizhik	(Croatia) Gianna Doz (Germany) Carmen Klaschka	—
Win	1.	17 September 2006	ITF Lleida, Spain	Clay	(Spain) Victoria Valls-Comamala	(Spain) Beatriz García Vidagany (Spain) Irene Rehberger Bescos	6–3, 6–1
Loss	2.	24 August 2008	ITF Westende, Belgium	Hard	(Russia) Julia Parasyuk	(Finland) Emma Laine (Belgium) Debbrich Feys	5–7, 5–7
Win	2.	31 August 2008	ITF Mollerusa, Spain	Hard	(Russia) Julia Parasyuk	(United Kingdom) Yasmin Clarke (United Kingdom) Olivia Scarfi	6–7^{(2)}, 6–0, [10–5]
Win	3.	8 February 2009	ITF Mallorca, Spain	Clay	(Morocco) Fatima El Allami	(Spain) Lucía Sainz (Spain) Leticia Costas	6–4, 6–1
Loss	3.	10 May 2009	ITF Badalona, Spain	Clay	(Spain) Sheila Solsona Carcasona	(Italy) Benedetta Davato (Spain) Cristina Sanchez-Quintanar	3–6, 4–6
Loss	4.	17 May 2009	ITF Vila Real de Santo António, Portugal	Clay	(Spain) Sheila Solsona Carcasona	(Portugal) Maria João Koehler (Portugal) Joana Pangaio Pereira	2–2 ret.
