= Tatjana Priachin =

German tennis player

- Country (sports): Germany
- Born: 30 July 1987 (age 37); Mannheim, West Germany
- Retired: 2010
- Plays: Right-handed (two-handed backhand)
- Prize money: $36,471

Singles
- Career record: 107–81
- Career titles: 2 ITF
- Highest ranking: No. 311 (16 June 2008)

Doubles
- Career record: 117–154
- Career titles: 1 ITF
- Highest ranking: No. 314 (07 August 2006)

Tatjana Priachin (born 30 July 1987) is a former professional German tennis player.

Her highest WTA singles ranking is 311 (achieved June 2008) and her highest doubles ranking is 314 (August 2006). Priachin won two singles and one doubles titles on the ITF.

In September 2007, she won the ITF 25K tennis tournament in Lecce, Italy, with partner Claire de Gubernatis.

== ITF Circuit finals ==
=== Singles: 3 (2 titles, 1 runner–ups) ===
Legend
W10 tournaments (2–2)

Finals by surface
Clay (2–1)

Result	W–L	Date	Tournament	Tier	Surface	Opponent	Score
Win	1–0	Jul 2004	ITF Getxo, Spain	W10	Clay	(Spain) Eloisa Compostizo de Andrés	6–3, 2–6, 6–1
Loss	1–1	Nov 2004	ITF Mallorca, Spain	W10	Clay	(Slovenia) Maša Zec Peškirič	4–6, 3–6
Win	2–1	Feb 2007	ITF Mallorca, Spain	W10	Clay	(Spain) Beatriz García Vidagany	6–3, 6–3

=== Doubles: 4 (1 titles, 3 runner-ups) ===
Legend
W25 tournaments
W10 tournaments

Result	W–L	Date	Tournament	Tier	Surface	Partner	Opponents	Score
Loss	0–1	Aug 2005	ITF Coimbra, Portugal	W25	Hard	(Germany) Angelique Kerber	(Spain) María José Martínez Sánchez (Portugal) Ana Catarina Nogueira	4–6, 6–7^{(1)}
Loss	0–2	Feb 2007	ITF Mallorca, Spain	W10	Clay	(Russia) Angelina Gabueva	(Czech Republic) Simona Dobrá (Romania) Antonia Xenia Tout	1–6, 2–6
Loss	0–3	Jul 2007	ITF Darmstadt, Germany	W25	Clay	(United States) Hilary Barte	(Belarus) Ekaterina Dzehalevich (Romania) Monica Niculescu	4–6, 5–7
Win	1–3	Sep 2007	ITF Lecce, Italy	W25	Clay	(France) Claire de Gubernatis	(Hungary) Kira Nagy (Italy) Valentina Sassi	6–3, 6–2
