= Martina Caregaro =

Italian tennis player

- Country (sports): Italy
- Born: 19 May 1992 (age 32)
- Plays: Right (two-handed backhand)
- Prize money: US$ 155,728

Singles
- Career record: 381–310
- Career titles: 9 ITF
- Highest ranking: No. 254 (30 November 2015)

Doubles
- Career record: 123–118
- Career titles: 9 ITF
- Highest ranking: No. 305 (9 September 2019)

Martina Caregaro (born 19 May 1992) is an inactive Italian tennis player.

Caregaro has won nine singles and nine doubles titles on tournaments of the ITF Circuit. On 30 November 2015, she reached her best singles ranking of 254. On 9 September 2019, she peaked at No. 305 in the WTA doubles rankings.

Playing for Italy Fed Cup team, Caregaro has a win–loss record of 0–1.

== ITF Circuit finals ==
=== Singles: 16 (9 titles, 7 runner–ups) ===
Legend $60,000 tournaments $25,000 tournaments $10/15,000 tournaments	Finals by surface Hard (0–2) Clay (9–5)

Result	W–L	Date	Tournament	Tier	Surface	Opponent	Score
Loss	0–1	Feb 2009	ITF Mallorca, Spain	10,000	Clay	(Spain) Eloisa Compostizo de Andrés	0–6, 7–6^{(5)}, 2–6
Win	1–1	Mar 2010	ITF Pomezia, Italy	10,000	Clay	(Spain) Eloisa Compostizo de Andrés	6–1, 6–1
Win	2–1	Oct 2010	ITF Ciampino, Italy	10,000	Clay	(Romania) Diana Enache	6–3, 6–3
Loss	2–2	Jul 2011	ITF Gardone Val Trompia, Italy	10,000	Clay	(Germany) Anne Schäfer	6–7^{(0)}, 6–0, 4–6
Win	3–2	Oct 2011	ITF Dubrovnik, Croatia	10,000	Clay	(Russia) Victoria Kan	6–3, 6–3
Loss	3–3	Nov 2011	ITF La Marsa, Tunisia	10,000	Clay	(Italy) Anastasia Grymalska	5–7, 6–2, 3–6
Win	4–3	Jun 2013	ITF Rome, Italy	10,000	Clay	(Italy) Jasmine Paolini	6–2, 6–3
Win	5–3	Aug 2013	ITF Rovereto, Italy	15,000	Clay	(Ukraine) Sofiya Kovalets	7–6^{(6)}, 6–3
Loss	5–4	Jun 2014	ITF Civitavecchia, Italy	10,000	Clay	(Russia) Polina Leykina	7–5, 6–4
Win	6–4	Nov 2014	ITF Pula, Italy	10,000	Clay	(Italy) Stefania Rubini	6–4, 6–4
Loss	6–5	Dec 2014	ITF Sousse, Tunisia	10,000	Hard	(Bosnia and Herzegovina) Dea Herdželaš	7–6^{(4)}, 2–6, 1–6
Win	7–5	Dec 2014	ITF Sousse, Tunisia	10,000	Hard	(Czech Republic) Tereza Malíková	6–4, 6–0
Loss	7–6	Mar 2015	ITF Solarino, Italy	10,000	Hard	(France) Irina Ramialison	1–6, 7–6^{(6)}, 4–6
Win	8–6	Sep 2017	ITF Trieste, Italy	15,000	Clay	(Italy) Federica di Sarra	2–6, 6–1, 6–2
Win	9–6	Jun 2019	ITF Padua, Italy	25,000	Clay	(Brazil) Paula Cristina Gonçalves	6–4, 6–4
Loss	9–7	Sep 2019	ITF Bagnatica, Italy	25,000+H	Clay	(Germany) Tamara Korpatsch	1–6, 2–6

=== Doubles: 19 (9 titles, 10 runner–ups) ===
Legend $60,000 tournaments $25,000 tournaments $10/15,000 tournaments	Finals by surface Hard (1–1) Clay (8–9)

Result	W–L	Date	Tournament	Tier	Surface	Partner	Opponents	Score
Win	1–0	Feb 2013	ITF Antalya, Turkey	10,000	Clay	(Italy) Giulia Bruzzone	(Romania) Ana Bogdan (Serbia) Teodora Mirčić	6–3, 1–6, [10–6]
Win	2–0	May 2013	ITF Pula, Italy	10,000	Clay	(Italy) Anna Floris	(Switzerland) Lisa Sabino (Italy) Annalisa Bona	6–2, 6–3
Win	3–0	May 2013	ITF Pula, Italy	10,000	Clay	(Italy) Anna Floris	(Canada) Erin Routliffe (Canada) Carol Zhao	6–2, 5–7, [10–7]
Win	4–0	Aug 2013	ITF Rovereto, Italy	15,000	Clay	(Italy) Anna Floris	(Ukraine) Olga Ianchuk (Slovakia) Chantal Škamlová	3–6, 6–4, [10–6]
Loss	4–1	Mar 2014	ITF Antalya, Turkey	10,000	Clay	(Italy) Anna Floris	(France) Estelle Cascino (Czech Republic) Martina Kubiciková	7–6^{(2)}, 2–6, [7–10]
Win	5–1	Mar 2014	ITF Pula, Italy	10,000	Clay	(Italy) Anna Floris	(Slovenia) Maša Zec Peškirič (Germany) Kim Grajdek	6–3, 5–7, [10–8]
Loss	5–2	May 2014	ITF Pula, Italy	10,000	Clay	(Italy) Anna Floris	(Romania) Diana Buzean (Italy) Claudia Giovine	2–6, 4–6
Win	6–2	Jun 2014	ITF Civitavecchia, Italy	10,000	Clay	(Italy) Anna Floris	(United States) Alexa Guarachi (Australia) Sally Peers	6–4, 6–4
Win	7–2	Nov 2014	ITF Pula, Italy	10,000	Clay	(Italy) Georgia Brescia	(Switzerland) Lisa Sabino (Germany) Anne Schäfer	3–6, 6–4, [10–6]
Win	8–2	Nov 2014	ITF Sousse, Tunisia	10,000	Hard	(Italy) Alice Balducci	(Serbia) Barbara Bonić (Ukraine) Oleksandra Korashvili	7–6^{(2)}, 6–4
Loss	8–3	Dec 2015	ITF Cairo, Egypt	25,000	Clay	(Hungary) Réka Luca Jani	(Russia) Valentyna Ivakhnenko (Slovenia) Dalila Jakupović	w/o
Loss	8–4	Mar 2016	ITF Curitiba, Brazil	25,000	Clay	(Hungary) Réka Luca Jani	(Argentina) Catalina Pella (Chile) Daniela Seguel	3–6, 6–7^{(5)}
Win	9–4	Sep 2017	ITF Trieste, Italy	15,000	Clay	(Argentina) Paula Ormaechea	(Italy) Alice Balducci (Italy) Camilla Scala	5–7, 7–5, [10–1]
Loss	9–5	Sep 2017	ITF Pula, Italy	25,000	Clay	(Italy) Martina di Giuseppe	(Italy) Claudia Giovine (Italy) Anastasia Grymalska	6–3, 5–7, [4–10]
Loss	9–6	Feb 2018	ITF Antalya, Turkey	15,000	Hard	(Italy) Federica di Sarra	(Georgia (country)) Ekaterine Gorgodze (Bosnia and Herzegovina) Dea Herdželaš	2–6, 4–6
Loss	9–7	Jun 2018	Verbier Open, Switzerland	15,000	Clay	(Italy) Federica di Sarra	(Czech Republic) Gabriela Horacková (Switzerland) Nina Stadler	6–7^{(5)}, 7–6^{(3)}, [7–10]
Loss	9–8	Jul 2018	ITF Torino, Italy	25,000	Clay	(Italy) Federica di Sarra	(Germany) Vivian Heisen (Egypt) Sandra Samir	3–6, 2–6
Loss	9–9	Aug 2019	Internazionali di Cordenons, Italy	25,000	Clay	(Switzerland) Lisa Sabino	(Slovenia) Veronika Erjavec (Slovenia) Nika Radišič	3–6, 5–7
Loss	9–10	Aug 2019	ITF Bagnatica, Italy	25,000	Clay	(Italy) Federica di Sarra	(Brazil) Carolina Alves (Brazil) Gabriela Cé	2–6, 6–1, [5–10]
