= 2007 Barcelona KIA =

- Date: 11–17 June
- Edition: 1st
- Category: WTA Tier IV
- Prize money: $145,000
- Surface: Clay / outdoor
- Location: Barcelona, Spain

Champions

Singles
- (United States) Meghann Shaughnessy

Doubles
- (Spain) Nuria Llagostera Vives / (Spain) Arantxa Parra Santonja
- Barcelona KIA

The 2007 Barcelona KIA was a tennis tournament played on outdoor clay courts. It was the first edition of the Barcelona Ladies Open as part of the WTA Tour and was part of the WTA Tier IV tournaments of the 2007 WTA Tour. It was held in Barcelona, Spain, from 11 June through 17 June 2007. Sixth-seeded Meghann Shaughnessy won the singles title.

== Finals ==
=== Singles ===
(United States) Meghann Shaughnessy defeated (Romania) Edina Gallovits, 6–3, 6–2

=== Doubles ===
(Spain) Nuria Llagostera Vives / (Spain) Arantxa Parra Santonja defeated (Spain) Lourdes Domínguez Lino / (Italy) Flavia Pennetta, 7–6^{(7–3)}, 2–6, [12–10]

== Points and prize money ==
=== Point distribution ===
Event	W	F	SF	QF	Round of 16	Round of 32	Q3	Q2	Q1
Singles	115	80	50	30	15	1	3	2	1
Doubles	115	80	50	30	1	—N/a	—N/a	—N/a	—N/a

=== Prize money ===
Event	W	F	SF	QF	Round of 16	Round of 32	Q3	Q2	Q1
Singles	$21,140	$11,395	$6,140	$3,310	$1,775	$955	$515	$280	$165
Doubles	$6,240	$3,360	$1,810	$970	$525	—N/a	—N/a	—N/a	—N/a
Doubles prize money per team

== Singles main draw entrants ==
=== Seeds ===
Country	Player	Rank	Seed
ITA	Francesca Schiavone	28	1
GER	Martina Müller	36	2
FRA	Émilie Loit	41	3
EST	Kaia Kanepi	55	4
ESP	Lourdes Domínguez Lino	59	5
USA	Meghann Shaughnessy	61	6
FRA	Virginie Razzano	62	7
ITA	Flavia Pennetta	67	8

=== Other entrants ===
The following players received wildcards into the singles main draw:

- (Spain) Nuria Llagostera Vives
- (Spain) Conchita Martínez Granados
- (Spain) Laura Pous Tió

The following players received entry from the qualifying draw:

- (Germany) Gréta Arn
- (Belarus) Ekaterina Dzehalevich
- (Argentina) María Emilia Salerni
- (Hungary) Ágnes Szávay

=== Retirements ===
- (Czech Republic) Iveta Benešová (right lumbar dysfunction)
- (Italy) Romina Oprandi (right arm bruise)

== Doubles main draw entrants ==
=== Seeds ===
Country	Player	Country	Player	Rank	Seed
CRO	Jelena Kostanić Tošić	UKR	Tatiana Perebiynis	93	1
ESP	Lourdes Domínguez Lino	ITA	Flavia Pennetta	112	2
GER	Martina Müller	CZE	Gabriela Navrátilová	154	3
UKR	Mariya Korittseva	POL	Alicja Rosolska	191	4

=== Other entrants ===
The following pairs received wildcards into the doubles main draw:

- (Spain) Laura Pous Tió / (Spain) Carla Suárez Navarro
