= Maite Gabarrús-Alonso =

Spanish tennis player (born 1989)

- Country (sports): Spain
- Born: 2 February 1989 (age 36); Pamplona, Spain
- Plays: Right-handed
- Prize money: $20,272

Singles
- Career record: 65–39
- Career titles: 3 ITF
- Highest ranking: No. 331 (6 October 2008)

Doubles
- Career record: 23–18
- Career titles: 2 ITF
- Highest ranking: No. 344 (20 October 2008)

Maite Gabarrús-Alonso (born 2 February 1989) is a Spanish former professional tennis player, and currently a professional padel player.

Gabarrús-Alonso, a native of Pamplona, reached a career high singles ranking of 331 in the world and qualified for her only WTA Tour main draw at the 2008 Barcelona Ladies Open.

== ITF finals ==
Legend
$25,000 tournaments
$10,000 tournaments

=== Singles (3–2) ===
Result	No.	Date	Tournament	Surface	Opponent	Score
Win	1.	4 June 2006	Tortosa, Spain	Clay	(Spain) Nuria Sánchez García	7–6^{(5)}, 6–2
Win	2.	14 October 2007	Benicarló, Spain	Clay	(Italy) Raffaella Bindi	6–2, 6–3
Win	3.	2 December 2007	Vallduxo, Spain	Clay	(Italy) Annalisa Bona	6–3, 3–6, 6–2
Loss	1.	27 April 2008	Torrent, Spain	Clay	(Spain) Matilde Munoz Gonzalves	3–6, 2–6
Loss	2.	18 May 2008	Badalona, Spain	Clay	(Spain) Eva Fernández Brugués	6–4, 1–6, 1–6

=== Doubles (2–3) ===
Result	No.	Date	Tournament	Surface	Partner	Opponents	Score
Win	1.	18 November 2007	Mallorca, Spain	Clay	(Spain) Leticia Costas	(Russia) Vasilisa Davydova (Russia) Elizaveta Tochilovskaya	7–5, 6–2
Loss	1.	10 February 2008	Mallorca, Spain	Clay	(Spain) Leticia Costas	(Switzerland) Lisa Sabino (Italy) Valentina Sulpizio	3–6, 6–7
Loss	2.	17 February 2008	Mallorca 2, Spain	Clay	(Spain) Leticia Costas	(Slovenia) Polona Hercog (Liechtenstein) Stephanie Vogt	6–7, 3–6
Loss	3.	18 May 2008	Badalona, Spain	Clay	(United Kingdom) Amanda Carreras	(Italy) Benedetta Davato (Italy) Lisa Sabino	6–2, 2–6, [8–10]
Win	2.	28 September 2008	Granada, Spain	Hard	(Spain) Leticia Costas	(Russia) Regina Kulikova (France) Irena Pavlović	walkover
