= Flavia Pennetta =

Italian tennis player (born 1982)

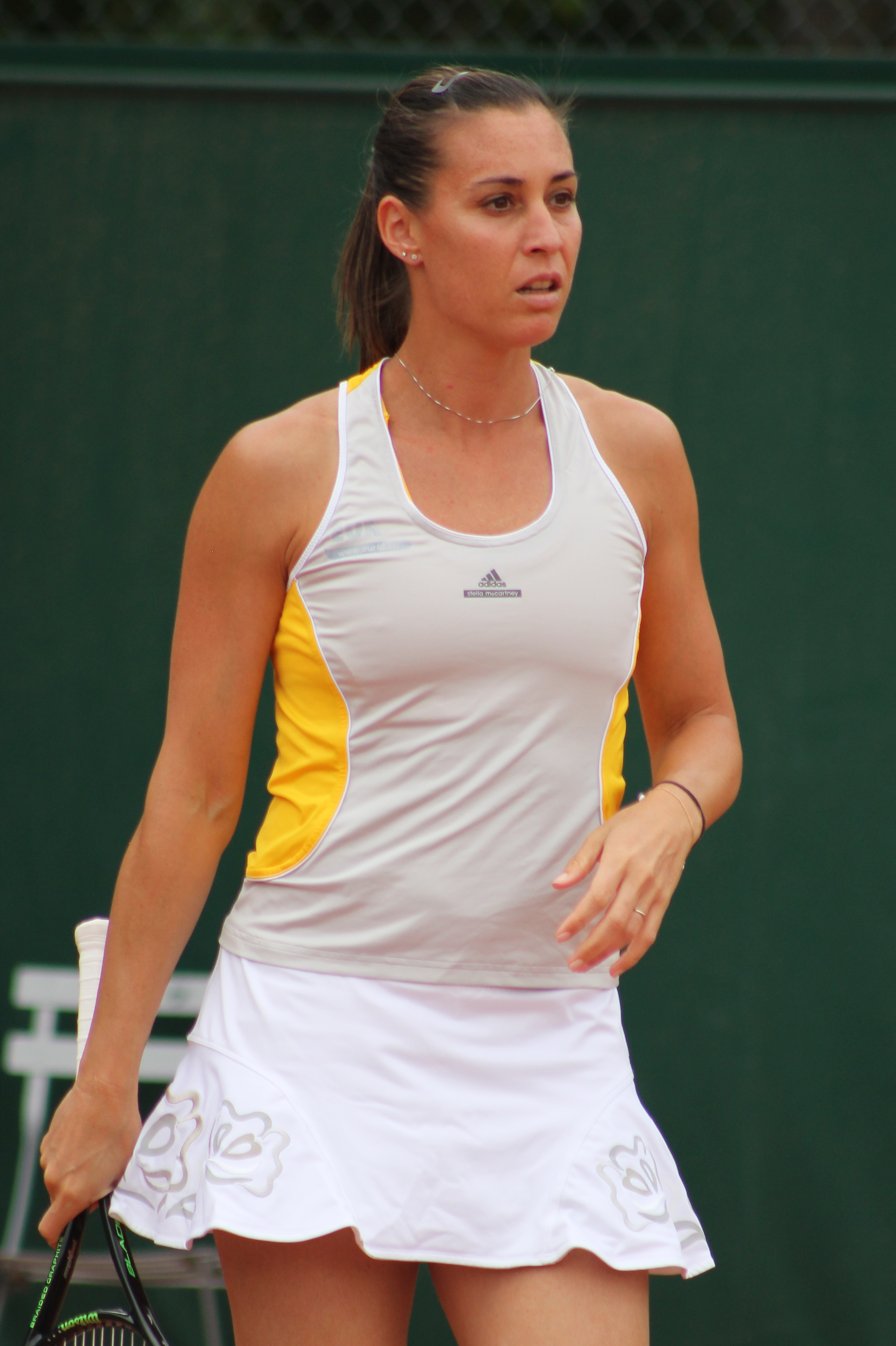
- Flavia Pennetta at the 2015 French Open
- Country (sports): Italy
- Residence: Brindisi, Italy
- Born: 25 February 1982 (age 44) Brindisi
- Height: 1.72 m (5 ft 8 in)
- Turned pro: 25 February 2000
- Retired: 29 October 2015
- Plays: Right-handed (two-handed backhand)
- Prize money: $14,197,886: 42nd in all-time rankings
- Official website: flaviapennetta.eu

Singles
- Career record: 582–365
- Career titles: 11
- Highest ranking: No. 6 (28 September 2015)

Grand Slam singles results
- Australian Open: QF (2014)
- French Open: 4R (2008, 2010, 2015)
- Wimbledon: 4R (2005, 2006, 2013)
- US Open: W (2015)

Other tournaments
- Tour Finals: RR (2015)
- Olympic Games: 3R (2012)

Doubles
- Career record: 393–243
- Career titles: 17
- Highest ranking: No. 1 (28 February 2011)

Grand Slam doubles results
- Australian Open: W (2011)
- French Open: QF (2010, 2015)
- Wimbledon: SF (2010, 2012)
- US Open: F (2005, 2014)

Other doubles tournaments
- Tour Finals: W (2010)
- Olympic Games: QF (2008)

Team competitions
- Fed Cup: W (2006, 2009, 2010, 2013), record 25–5

Flavia Pennetta (Italian pronunciation: [ˈflaːvja penˈnetta]; born 25 February 1982) is an Italian former professional tennis player. She became Italy's first top-ten female singles player on 17 August 2009 and the first Italian to be ranked world No. 1 in doubles on 28 February 2011. She is a Grand Slam champion in both doubles and singles, having won the 2011 Australian Open women's doubles title with Gisela Dulko and the 2015 US Open singles title over childhood friend Roberta Vinci in the first all-Italian major final. Pennetta won ten other WTA singles titles, including the 2014 Indian Wells Open, where she defeated the top two seeds. She also was a mainstay in the Fed Cup team competition, helping Italy win four titles in 2006, 2009, 2010, and 2013. Her other highlights in doubles include winning the 2010 WTA Finals with Dulko and finishing runner-up at the 2005 and 2014 US Open tournaments, partnering respectively with Elena Dementieva and Martina Hingis.

After winning the 2015 US Open, Pennetta announced she would retire at the end of the season, playing her last tournament at her WTA Finals singles debut. There, she defeated eventual champion Agnieszka Radwańska in the round-robin stage and retired with a top-ten singles ranking.

Pennetta was pronounced a Knight of Order of Merit of the Republic on 24 January 2007 by Carlo Azeglio Ciampi, then President of Italy.

== Career ==
=== Early years ===
Pennetta was introduced to tennis at the age of five by her father. At age 17, she won the 1999 French Open in girls' doubles with fellow Italian Roberta Vinci.

Pennetta began to play on the ITF Women's Circuit in 1997. The following year, she lost in the second round of her first qualifying tournament for a WTA Tour main draw, the Internazionali Femminili di Palermo. In 1999, Pennetta won two singles titles and two doubles titles on the ITF Circuit. She was unsuccessful in her several attempts to qualify for WTA Tour main draws in 2000. The following year, she limited her play to the ITF Circuit.

She played her first WTA Tour main-draw match at the Cellular South Cup in 2002, when she lost in the first round. She also lost in the first round in Palermo but reached the second round of the Idea Prokom Open in Sopot. Her ranking reached the top 100 for the first time on 23 September 2002, when she reached No. 100.

=== 2003 ===
In 2003, Pennetta lost in the semifinals of the Hyderabad Open to eventual champion Tamarine Tanasugarn. She also reached the quarterfinals at the Canberra Women's Classic, Copa Colsanitas, and Abierto Mexicano Telcel. She debuted in the main draws of all four Grand Slam tournaments. Her best result was the third round of the Roland Garros, where she defeated 21st-seeded American Lisa Raymond in the second round, before losing to Hungary's Petra Mandula.

=== 2004: First WTA title ===
Pennetta started the year at the Tier V Canberra Classic, where she lost in the quarterfinals to Julia Vakulenko. At the Australian Open, she lost in the first round to Italian Antonella Serra Zanetti in straight sets.

Pennetta then lost in the first round of both the Cellular South Cup in Memphis, Tennessee and the Copa Colsanitas in Bogotá, Colombia. These losses were followed by her first WTA Tour final at the Mexicano Open in Acapulco, where she was defeated by Iveta Benešová.

She played both of the Tier I springtime hardcourt tournaments in the United States. She beat Ľudmila Cervanová in the first round of the Pacific Life Open in Indian Wells before losing to Maria Sharapova. She then lost in the first round of qualifying for the NASDAQ-100 Open in Key Biscayne.

Returning to clay courts, Pennetta lost in the second round of two consecutive WTA tournaments, the Morocco Open in Casablanca and the Portugal Open in Estoril. At the Budapest Grand Prix, Pennetta lost in the semifinals to eventual champion Jelena Janković in straight sets. She then defeated world No. 6, Nadia Petrova, in the second round of the Internazionali BNL d'Italia in Rome before falling to world No. 21, Anna Smashnova, in the third round. At the French Open, Pennetta lost in the first round, once more to Smashnova in straight sets.

In the first grass-court tournament of her career, she defeated Marion Bartoli in the first round of the DFS Classic in Birmingham, before losing to world No. 32, Alicia Molik, in the second round. Pennetta achieved the same result at the Ordina Open, falling to world No. 85, Barbara Schett. At Wimbledon, she was beaten by Petrova in the first round, in three sets.

In July, she played yet another clay-court tournament, where she was beaten in the final of the Internazionali di Palermo by Anabel Medina Garrigues. Returning to hard courts for the first time since April, she lost to Henrieta Nagyová in the first round of the Nordic Light Open in Stockholm. The following week at the clay-court tournament in Sopot, Poland, Pennetta won her first WTA Tour title, defeating Klára Koukalová in the final. Pennetta then lost to former world No. 1, Lindsay Davenport, in the quarterfinals of the Cincinnati Open, and to world No. 25, Magdalena Maleeva, in the first round of the US Open, 6–2, 4–6, 4–6.

Pennetta played four tournaments the remainder of the year. At the Wismilak International in Bali, Pennetta lost in the second round to eventual quarterfinalist Gisela Dulko. She then fell to María Vento-Kabchi in the first round of the China Open in Beijing and to Tamarine Tanasugarn in the second round of the Guangzhou International Open. In her final event of the year, she lost to world No. 14, Ai Sugiyama, in the second round of the Zurich Open, in two sets.

=== 2005: Top-30 appearance, first Grand Slam final in doubles ===
In Pennetta's first event of the year, she reached the quarterfinals of the Brisbane International losing to Tatiana Golovin in three sets. She then lost in the first rounds of the Australian Open and the Open Gaz de France. In the next two weeks she won two titles in a row, the first one, Copa Colsanitas defeating Lourdes Domínguez Lino in the finals, 7–6, 6–4, and the second one, the Mexican Open, defeating Ľudmila Cervanová in three sets. Pennetta lost early in her next tournaments. The second rounds of the Pacific Life Open, the German Open and the Rome Masters. She also lost in the first round of the Estoril Open and the third rounds of the Miami Masters and the French Open. She bounced back in the Wimbledon Championships by reaching the fourth round, losing to Mary Pierce in straight sets, and the semifinals of both the Internazionali di Modena and the Internazionali Femminili di Palermo, which were held in Italy. She followed it up with losses to Japanese players Akiko Morigami in the San Diego Classic and Aiko Nakamura in the LA Championships. In the Rogers Cup she was crushed by eventual champion Kim Clijsters 6–0, 6–1. In the US Open she was upset by German Julia Schruff in the first round. She also lost early in the China Open in the first round and the Kremlin Cup in the second round to eventual champion Mary Pierce. She ended the year with quarterfinal appearances in the Wismilak International, the Porsche Tennis Grand Prix, and the Zurich Open. She ended the year ranked No. 23 in the world.

=== 2006 ===
Flavia had a good start to the 2006 season, finishing runner-up at Gold Coast against Lucie Šafářová. At Sydney, she was defeated by Li Na in the first round. Going into the Australian Open, Pennetta defeated Cara Black and Martina Suchá, before falling to Nicole Vaidišová in the third round. In Paris, she was upset by rising star Sania Mirza in two sets.

Pennetta started to pick up her pace as the season went on, with two runner-up showings at Bogotá and Acapulco, losing to Lourdes Domínguez Lino and Anna-Lena Grönefeld, respectively.

=== 2007 ===
Pennetta began 2007 with three first-round losses at the Gold Coast, Hobart and the Australian Open, falling to Maria Kirilenko, Aiko Nakamura and Kaia Kanepi, respectively.

Her next two tournaments went well, as she had a semifinal showing at Bogotá (falling to Roberta Vinci) and made it all the way to the final of Acapulco, where she lost to Émilie Loit. Then she lost four straight matches at Indian Wells, Miami, Amelia Island and Charleston. She managed to take a win from Arantxa Parra Santonja at Estoril before getting overpowered by Gisela Dulko. Then came another streak of first-round losses—at Berlin, Rome, and the French Open.

At Barcelona, Flavia made it to the semifinals, where she was beaten by Meghann Shaughnessy. Then at 's-Hertogenbosch, she defeated Karin Knapp and Tatjana Malek to make it to the quarterfinals, where she lost to Dinara Safina. She was eliminated in the first round of the Wimbledon Championships.

She made it to the semifinals of Biella, falling to Agnieszka Radwańska.

=== 2008: First Grand Slam quarterfinal, top-20 appearance ===
Pennetta started the year by losing in the second round of the Australian Hardcourts in Gold Coast to Dinara Safina. Pennetta then reached the semifinals of the Hobart International, where she lost to eventual champion Eleni Daniilidou. At the Australian Open, she defeated Dominika Cibulková in the first round but fell to the 30th-seeded Virginie Razzano in the second round. Pennetta then played for Italy's Fed Cup team versus Spain. She played one singles match versus Anabel Medina Garrigues and lost. Pennetta won her first title of the year at the Cachantún Cup in Viña del Mar, Chile, defeating Klára Zakopalová in the final. However, she lost in the first round of the Copa Colsanitas to Betina Jozami. Pennetta then won her second title of the year at the Acapulco Open, beating Alizé Cornet in the final.

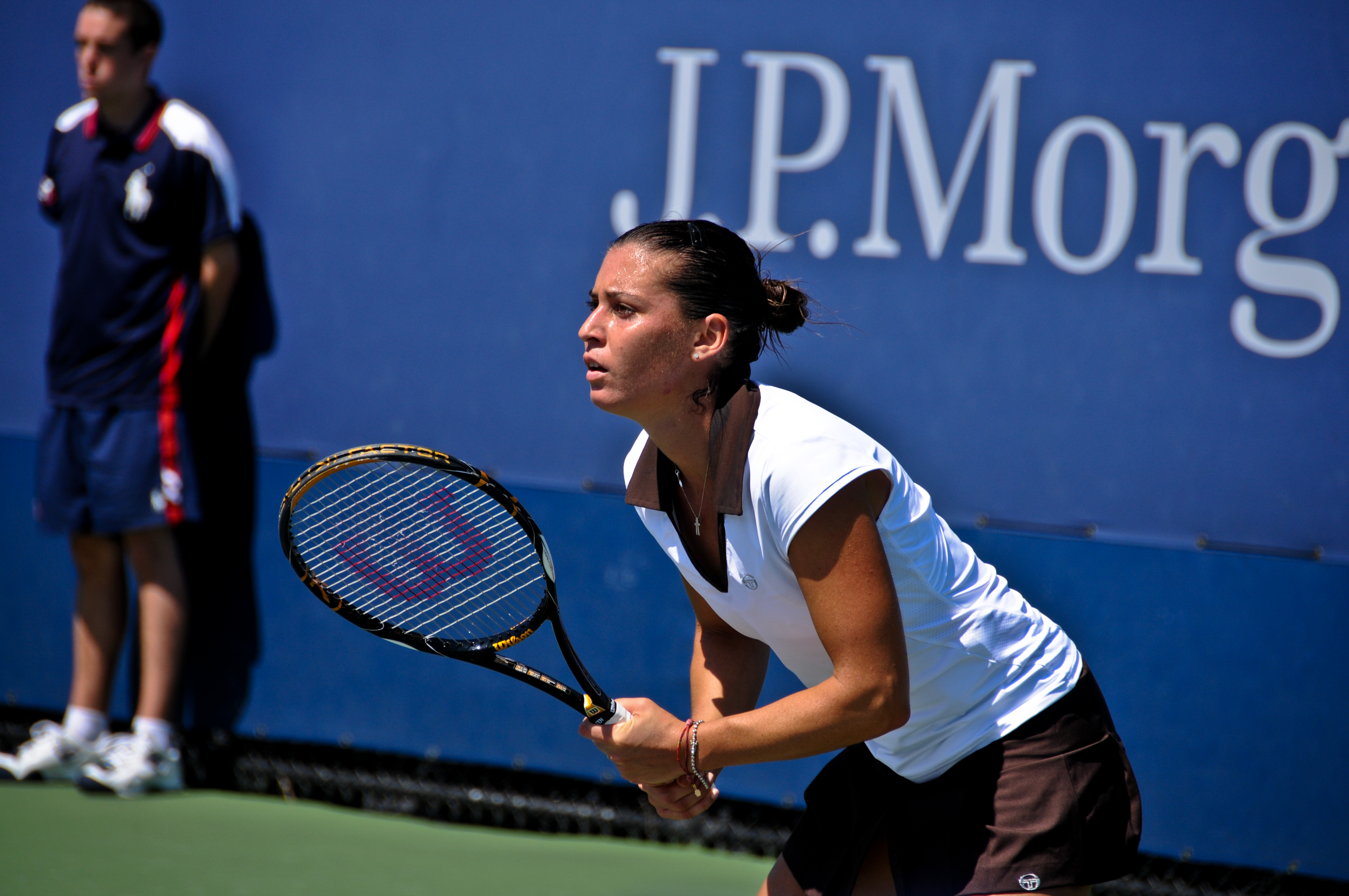
Pennetta reached the quarterfinals of the 2008 US Open, her first at a Grand Slam

As the 30th seed, Pennetta received a bye in the first round of the Pacific Life Open. She then defeated Kaia Kanepi in the second round but was defeated by fellow Italian Francesca Schiavone in the third round. She also fell to defending champion Serena Williams at the Sony Ericsson Open in Key Biscayne in the third round. Pennetta then lost in the second round of the Estoril Open to Iveta Benešová. She defeated Olga Savchuk in the first round of the Internazionali BNL d'Italia in Rome before losing to defending champion Jelena Janković in the second round. She then withdrew from her quarterfinal match against Medina Garrigues at the Internationaux de Strasbourg. At the French Open, Pennetta defeated eighth-seeded Venus Williams in the third round before losing to Carla Suárez Navarro in the fourth round.

Pennetta lost in the first round of her first tournament on grass at the Ordina Open to Sania Mirza. She then defeated Julia Vakulenko in the first round of Wimbledon before losing to Ai Sugiyama in the second round. She then played at the Internazionali di Palermo and lost to eventual champion Sara Errani in the semifinals. Pennetta then lost in the final of the East West Bank Classic in Los Angeles to Dinara Safina. At the following tournament, the Rogers Cup, she was defeated by a qualifier, Michelle Larcher de Brito, in the second round. She was then the part of the Italian Olympic team at the Summer Olympics in Beijing; however, lost to Kaia Kanepi in the first round. Pennetta also reached the second round of the Pilot Pen Tennis tournament in New Haven. At the US Open, she defeated Stefanie Vögele in the first round, Peng Shuai and former world No. 3 Nadia Petrova in the second and the third rounds; and former world No. 1 Amélie Mauresmo in the fourth round, before losing to Safina in the quarterfinals. It was Pennetta's best singles performance at a Grand Slam tournament then.

Pennetta then reached the quarterfinals of the Commonwealth Bank Tennis Classic in Bali, losing to eventual runner-up Tamira Paszek. At the Pan Pacific Open in Tokyo, she lost in the quarterfinals to former world No. 1, Jelena Janković. Pennetta then lost to Kateryna Bondarenko in the first round of the Porsche Grand Prix; to world No. 1 Janković in the quarterfinals of the Kremlin Cup in Moscow; and to Venus Williams in the final of the Zurich Open. At her last tournament of the year, the Linz Open, Pennetta defeated Ágnes Szávay in the first round and Dominika Cibulková in the second round before losing to former world No. 1 and eventual champion, Ana Ivanovic, in the quarterfinals.

=== 2009: Continued success ===
Pennetta played her first tournament of the year at the Hobart International (actually it was at the Hopman Cup), where she was the top seed. She defeated Shahar Pe'er in the first round and then fell to Magdaléna Rybáriková in the second round. Pennetta was the thirteenth seed at the Australian Open, where she lost in the third round to Anabel Medina Garrigues. Pennetta then played for Italy's Fed Cup team in the Fed Cup World Group stage versus France. Italy won 5–0. Pennetta won both her singles matches over Amélie Mauresmo and Alizé Cornet. At her first tournament of the year on clay, the Copa Sony Ericsson Colsanitas in Bogotá, Pennetta fell to Maša Zec Peškirič in the first round. She reached the final of the Mexican Open for the sixth straight year but lost to Venus Williams in two sets. Returning to hard courts at the Monterrey Open, Pennetta lost to Barbora Záhlavová-Strýcová in the second round. She was the 15th seed at the BNP Paribas Open in Indian Wells, the first Premier Mandatory event of the year, and lost in the fourth round to eventual runner-up Ana Ivanovic in a three-set match. Pennetta lost in the third round of the Miami Open in Key Biscayne, another Premier Mandatory event, to Mauresmo.

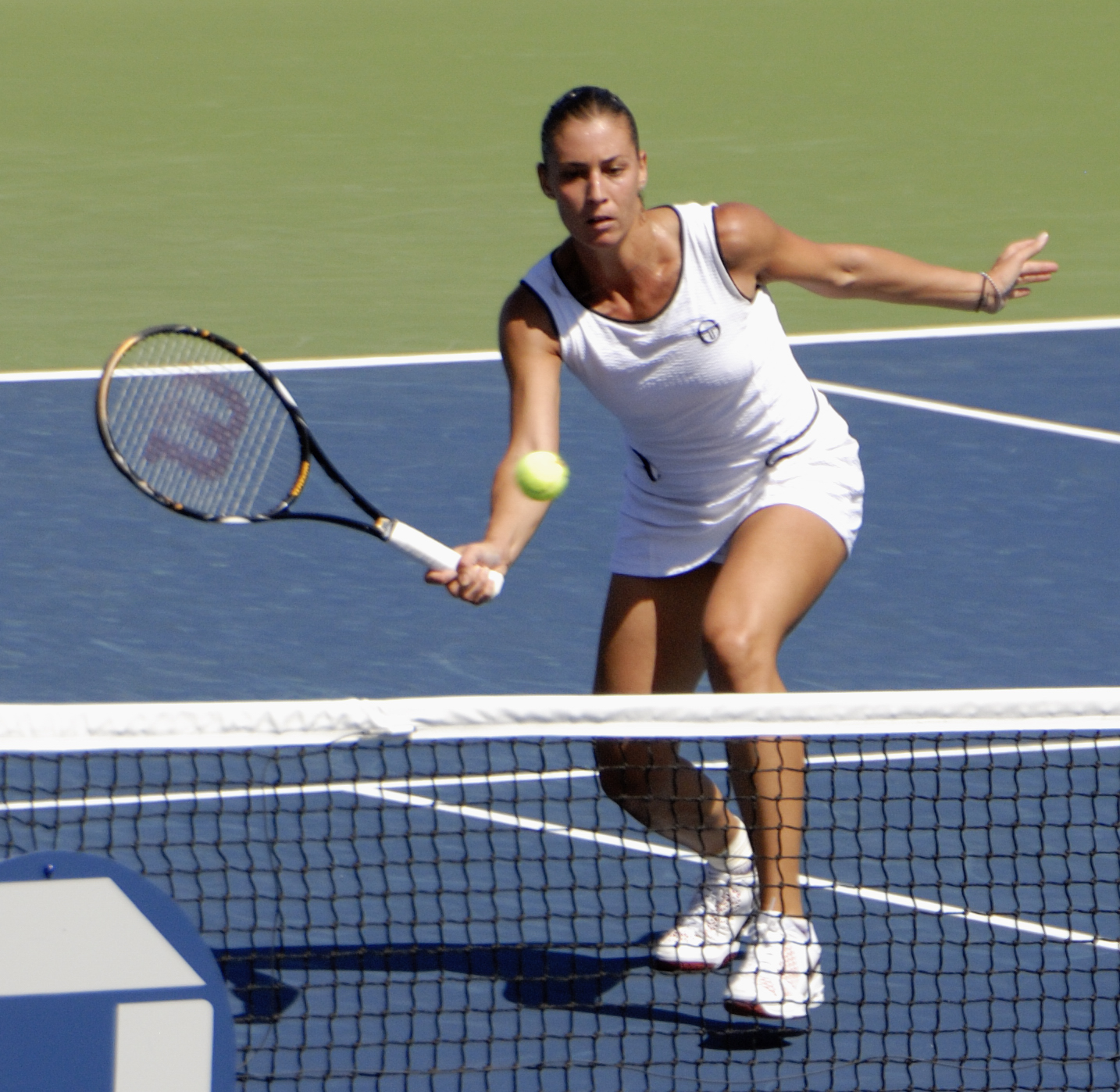
Pennetta at the 2009 US Open

Pennetta then played a series of clay-court events in preparation for the French Open. She lost to fellow Italian Roberta Vinci in the second round of the Barcelona Open. She then played two matches for Italy's Fed Cup team in the World Group semifinals versus reigning champion Russia. She defeated Anna Chakvetadze and lost to Svetlana Kuznetsova, but the final result was 4–1 in favor of Italy. This will be the second Fed Cup final for Pennetta. The following week, she reached the semifinals of the Porsche Tennis Grand Prix in Stuttgart beating two top-ten players, Jelena Janković and Nadia Petrova, but fell to world No. 1 player Dinara Safina, in three sets. At the Italian Open in Rome, a Premier-5 event, Pennetta lost in the third round to Kuznetsova, 0–6 in the third set. The following week, she was upset by Ágnes Szávay in the first round of the Madrid Open, the third Premier-Mandatory event of the year, losing in three sets. Pennetta, seeded 11th, lost in the first round of the 2009 French Open to Alexa Glatch. At Wimbledon, she advanced to the third round, where she was ousted by the No. 17, Amélie Mauresmo, in straight sets. Pennetta then played on her home soil in Palermo, defeating Sara Errani in the final in two sets. She and partner Vinci advanced to the semifinals in doubles. On the hard courts of Los Angeles, Pennetta upset Vera Zvonareva en route to the semifinals, where she would be extended to three sets by Maria Sharapova. In her second consecutive final at the event, she defeated Samantha Stosur in two sets. At Cincinnati, a Premier-5 event, she extended her winning streak to 15 matches, maintaining an impressive record against Venus Williams, whom she beat in two sets. By virtue of her defeat over Daniela Hantuchová in the quarterfinals, she rose into the top ten for the first time in her career, the first Italian woman ever to do so. Her run ended after a straight-sets defeat against world No. 1, Dinara Safina, in the semifinals.

Pennetta was seeded 12th at Toronto but lost to Virginie Razzano in the second round. At her next tournament in New Haven, she lost in the semifinals to Caroline Wozniacki. Pennetta started the US Open with a win over Edina Gallovits in two sets. In the second round, she double-bageled Sania Mirza 6–0, 6–0. She advanced to the fourth round after a straight-sets victory against Aleksandra Wozniak. She played Vera Zvonareva in the fourth round, and saved four match points at her serve at 5–6 in the second set and then saved another two in the second set tie-break, before winning the final set to love. She was defeated by Serena Williams in the quarterfinals in straight sets. After the US Open, Pennetta lost again to Roberta Vinci in the first round of the Pan Pacific Open in Tokyo. At the China Open, she made the quarterfinal, losing to Zvonareva, 5–7 in the third set. As the top seed at the Generali Ladies Linz tournament, Pennetta lost in the semifinals to third seed Yanina Wickmayer in straight sets. In the following week, she was forced to retire at with a knee injury in the opening round.

=== 2010: Doubles success ===
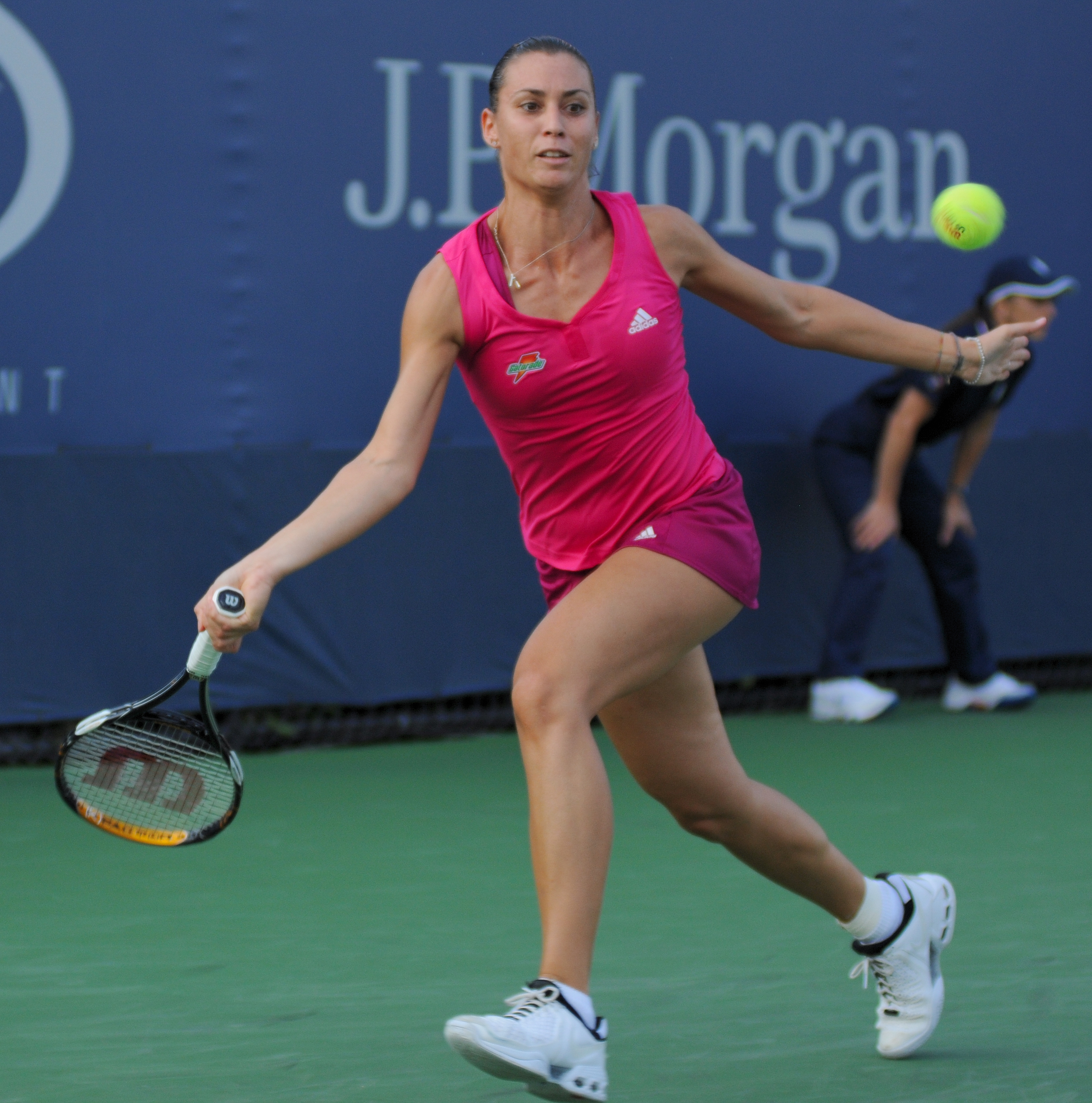
Pennetta at the US Open in 2010

Pennetta started her season at the Auckland Open as the No. 1 seed, where she defeated Jill Craybas, Carla Suárez Navarro, Dominika Cibulková, and Francesca Schiavone in the semifinals. She lost to third seed Yanina Wickmayer. In the Medibank International, she notched up two top-20 wins over Sam Stosur and Li Na before losing to unseeded Aravane Rezaï in the quarterfinals. At the first Grand Slam of the year, Pennetta was the 12th seed. In the opening round, she defeated former top-ten player Anna Chakvetadze before falling in the second round to qualifier and world No. 16 Yanina Wickmayer. The loss was her third consecutive straight-set loss to Wickmayer. Pennetta was selected for Italy's first Fed Cup tie against Ukraine. She won both her singles matches in straight sets against the Bondarenko sisters to set up a 4–1 away victory in the tie. Pennetta received a wildcard into Open GDF Suez in Paris, where she was the 2nd seed. After receiving a first-round bye, she defeated Alisa Kleybanova and Tathiana Garbin to reach the semifinals, where she fell in three sets to Lucie Šafářová.

At the Dubai Championships, Pennetta advanced to the third round, losing to seventh seed Agnieszka Radwańska. She was forced to withdraw from the Abierto Mexicano due to a hip injury. Pennetta suffered two early upset defeats at the two Premier events, Indian Wells Open and the Miami Open. After receiving first-round byes, Pennetta lost in the third round of Indian Wells to Shahar Pe'er and in the second round of Miami to Andrea Petkovic. Despite her poor singles result in Miami, Pennetta was able to win the doubles title in Miami, partnering with Gisela Dulko and defeating Sam Stosur and Nadia Petrova in the final. At the Andalucia Tennis Experience, Pennetta won her first title of the year, advancing to the finals without dropping a set and defeating Carla Suárez Navarro in the final.

At the French Open, Pennetta was seeded 14th. She defeated Anne Keothavong, Roberta Vinci, and Polona Hercog in the first three rounds. She was eliminated by third seed Caroline Wozniacki in the round of 16. However, her performance moved her ranking back into the top 10, matching her career-high of world No. 10. This, in combination with countrywoman Francesca Schiavone winning the French Open, meant that in the week of 7 June 2010, two Italian women were in the top ten (Schiavone at world No. 6) at the same time for the first time. Pennetta was seeded 10th at Wimbledon where she advanced to the third round and fell to Klára Zakopalová. She was seeded fifth at the San Diego Open. In the quarterfinals, she defeated Sam Stosur before she fell to Svetlana Kuznetsova.

=== 2011: Australian Open doubles title, No. 1 ranking ===
Pennetta began her year at the Sydney International, where in her first match she defeated qualifier Lucie Hradecká. In the second round, Flavia went on to defeat world No. 2, Vera Zvonareva, in a tough match. She went on to lose to Bojana Jovanovski in the quarterfinals.

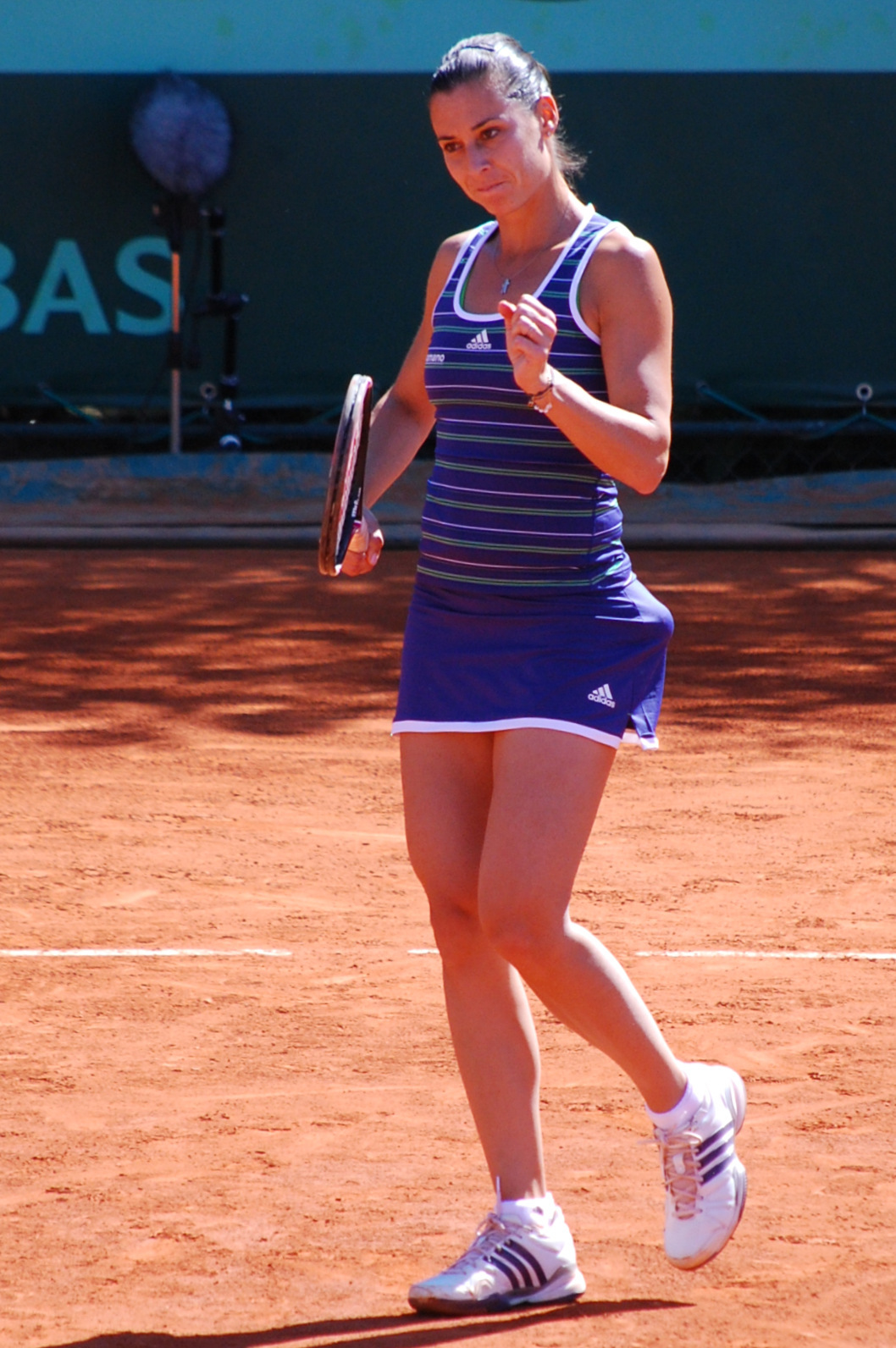
Pennetta at the French Open in 2011

At the Australian Open, Pennetta won her first-round match against Anastasia Rodionova. In her second-round match, she defeated Lourdes Domínguez Lino before Pennetta came up victorious against Shahar Pe'er in a three-set battle, in which she rallied from deficits several times. She lost to Czech player Petra Kvitová in the fourth round. She did, however, capture her first career Grand Slam doubles title in the doubles competition, again partnering with Dulko and beating Victoria Azarenka and Maria Kirilenko in the final. In the Fed Cup, she helped two-time reigning champion Italy defeat Australia with wins in two singles rubbers over Sam Stosur and Jarmila Groth.

At the Dubai Championships, Pennetta was seeded 11th. In the first round, she defeated wildcard Jelena Dokić. She advanced to the semifinal after defeating Zakopalová, Azarenka, and Alisa Kleybanova, respectively. However, there she was defeated by Svetlana Kuznetsova.

As the 21st seed at the Wimbledon Championships, Pennetta eased past Chanelle Scheepers in two sets before seeing off Evgeniya Rodina to reach to the third round. She then fell to Marion Bartoli in a close match with Bartoli edging the win in three sets.

On 28 February, Pennetta became the first Italian tennis player (male or female) to be ranked world No. 1 in doubles.

Pennetta was the 26th seed at the US Open. She defeated Aravane Rezaï, Romina Oprandi, third seed Maria Sharapova, and 13th seed Peng Shuai in straight sets, to reach the US Open quarterfinals for the third time, where she lost to Angelique Kerber.

Pennetta's next tournament was the Japan Open, where she was eliminated in the first round by Kaia Kanepi after a three-set match. At Beijing, she made it to the semifinals, beating the defending champion and world No. 1, Caroline Wozniacki, in three sets, before losing to Agnieszka Radwańska, in straight sets.

=== 2012: Wrist injury and out of top 50 ===
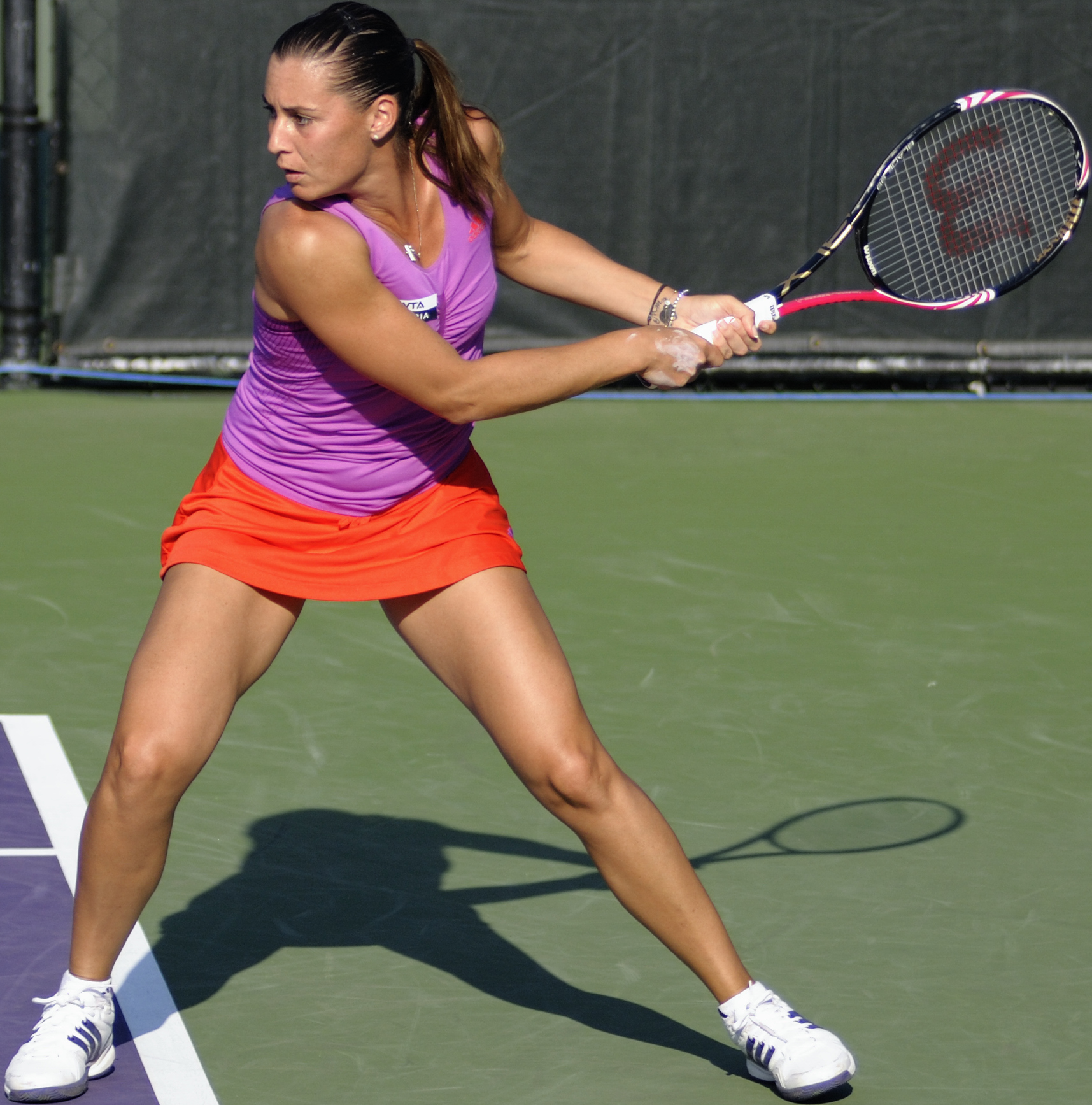
Pennetta at the 2012 Miami Open

Pennetta retired against Zheng Jie in final of Auckland. At the Australian Open, she lost to Nina Bratchikova in round one. She then reached the second round at Doha and Dubai, losing on both occasions to Kateryna Bondarenko and Jelena Janković, respectively. Pennetta then reached the final at Acapulco, where she lost to Sara Errani.

During the North American hardcourt swing, Pennetta reached the third round at Indian Wells, losing to Agnieszka Radwańska. Then at the Miami Open, she lost to wildcard Garbiñe Muguruza in the third round. At the Barcelona Open, Pennetta, the fifth seed, lost to Ukrainian Yuliya Beygelzimer in the second round. Unseeded at the Rome Masters, Pennetta reached the quarterfinals after defeating Maria Kirilenko, Sloane Stephens, and Petra Cetkovská. She then lost to Serena Williams. At the French Open, she reached the third round, where she lost to eventual quarterfinalist Angelique Kerber.

Pennetta kicked off the grass-court season with a second-round appearance at the Rosmalen Open, losing to Urszula Radwańska. At Wimbledon, she fell to Camila Giorgi in round 1. At the Olympics, Pennetta defeated Sorana Cîrstea and Tsvetana Pironkova before losing to Petra Kvitová in round 3. At the Montreal, Pennetta lost to Chanelle Scheepers in the second round after receiving a first-round bye. Pennetta did not play the US Open due to injury. On 27 August 2012, Pennetta underwent surgical cleaning of her right wrist, performed by the doctor who has treated Rafael Nadal.

=== 2013: Comeback from injury, US Open semifinal ===
Pennetta returned to competition at the Copa Colsanitas ranked 60th. She lost to Lara Arruabarrena in the second round. The following week, she fell to Lourdes Domínguez Lino in the first round at the Abierto Mexicano where she was finalist the year before. She then lost to Francesca Schiavone in the first round at Indian Wells. At the Miami Open, Pennetta defeated Johanna Larsson in round one before losing to world No. 1, Serena Williams.

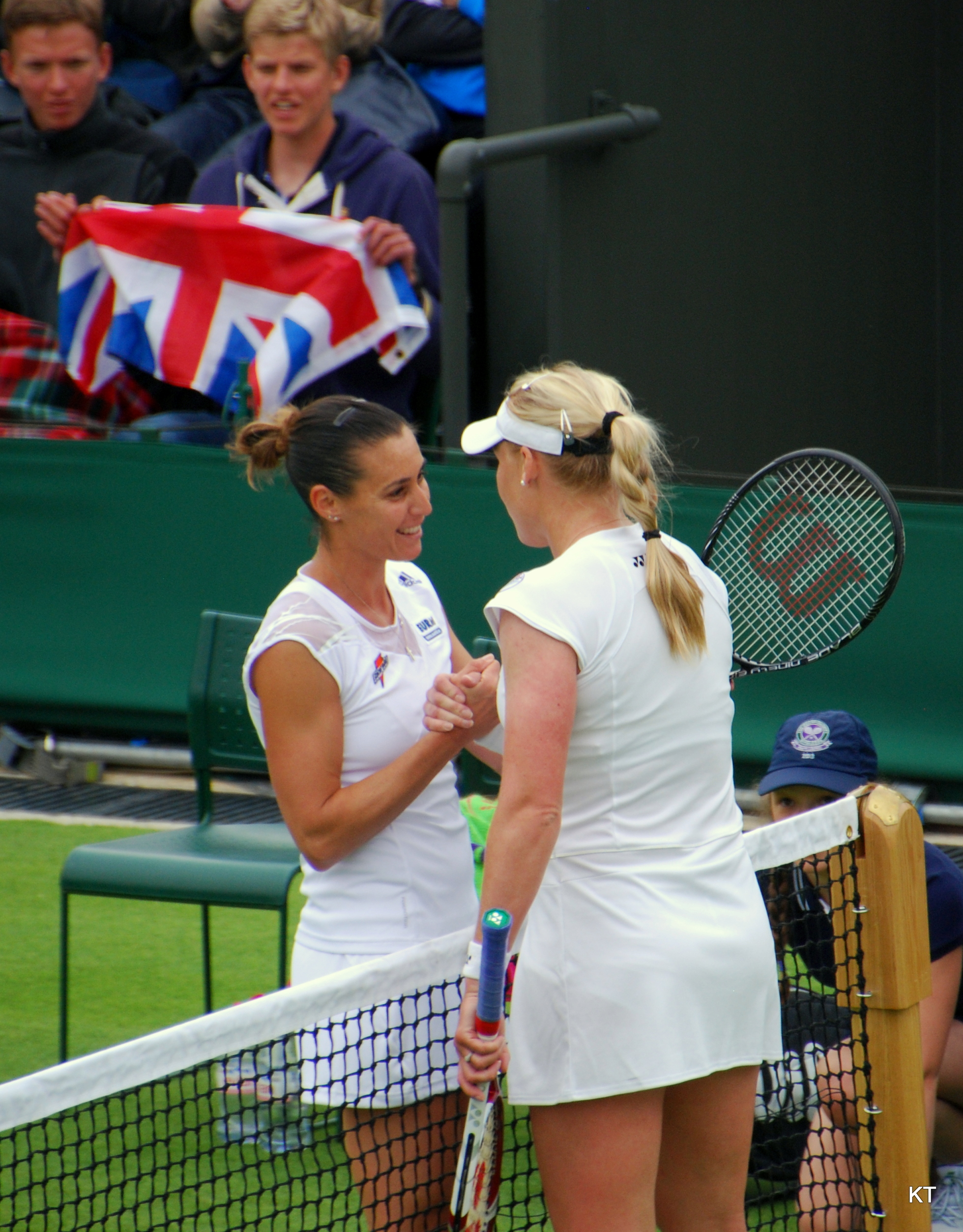
Pennetta and Elena Baltacha at Wimbledon in 2013

Pennetta lost in the first round at Madrid and Rome to Kaia Kanepi and Sloane Stephens, respectively. The week before the French Open, Pennetta qualified for the Internationaux de Strasbourg and reached the semifinals where she lost to Lucie Hradecká. At the French Open, she lost to Kirsten Flipkens in the first round. Pennetta had a breakthrough at Wimbledon where she advanced to the fourth round for the first time in more than five years. She defeated Elena Baltacha in her opening match before receiving a walkover from Victoria Azarenka in the second round. She then went on to defeat Alizé Cornet in three sets before losing to Flipkens again. Pennetta then reached the semifinals at Båstad where she lost to Larsson.

During the US Open Series, Pennetta fell in the first round at the Southern California Open to Schiavone. At the Rogers Cup in Toronto, she defeated Urszula Radwańska in the first round. She then lost to the 16th seed Ana Ivanovic. The following week in Cincinnati, she lost to American Varvara Lepchenko in the first round. Pennetta was ranked 83rd entering the US Open and she reached her first Grand Slam singles semifinal, defeating higher-ranked opponents such as Errani, Kuznetsova, Halep and Vinci in early rounds before succumbing to world No. 2, Victoria Azarenka, in the semifinals.

In September, Pennetta reached the second round at Tokyo after defeating Daniela Hantuchová. She then lost to Caroline Wozniacki. At the China Open, she drew Ivanovic in the first round, and lost in straight sets. At the Osaka Open, she lost to Vania King in the first round. Pairing with Kristina Mladenovic, she won the doubles title, defeating Samantha Stosur and Zhang Shuai in the final.

=== 2014: Indian Wells champion, US Open doubles final ===
As the 28th seed Pennetta reached the quarterfinals at Australian Open, having defeated Angelique Kerber in the fourth round. She lost to Li Na, who then went on to win the tournament. Pennetta then suffered a shocking first round defeat to Hsieh Su-wei in Doha. In Dubai she reached main draw and then defeated Kaia Kanepi and 2nd seed Agnieszka Radwańska, before losing the match against Venus Williams in quarterfinals. Pennetta then won the biggest title of her career at Indian Wells where she defeated Radwańska to win the final. She had defeated top seed Li Na en route to the final. At the Miami Open, Pennetta lost to Ana Ivanovic in the third round. The following week at Monterrey, as the top seed, she lost her opener to Kimiko Date-Krumm.

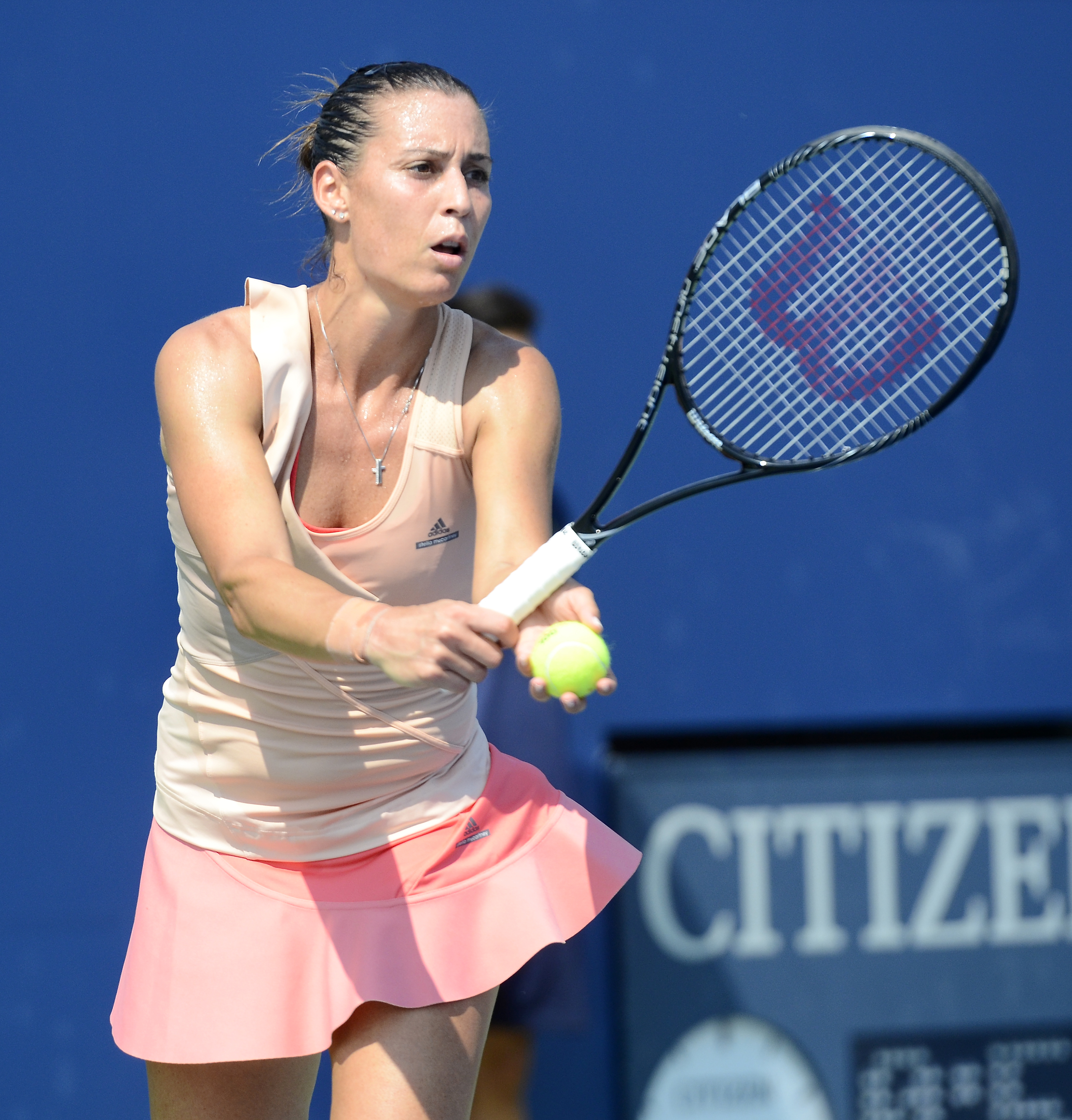
2014 Pennetta reached her fifth US Open quarterfinal

During the clay-court season, Pennetta reached the second round at Stuttgart, where she lost to Jelena Janković. At the Mutua Madrid Open, Pennetta fell in round one to Lucie Šafářová. Playing in front of her home crowd at the Internazionali BNL d'Italia, she reached the third round after defeating Yvonne Meusburger and Belinda Bencic. She subsequently lost to Janković again. At Roland Garros, Pennetta lost to Johanna Larsson in the second round. She reached the second round at Eastbourne where she lost to local girl Heather Watson. In doubles, she partnered with Martina Hingis and they reached the final, losing to the Chan sisters. At Wimbledon, Pennetta lost to American Lauren Davis in the second round.

Pennetta kicked off her US Open series campaign with a first round to Kazakh Yulia Putintseva at Montreal. The following week, she reached the third round at Cincinnati where she lost to Serena Williams. Pennetta then reached her fifth US Open quarterfinal after defeating Casey Dellacqua in the fourth round. She succumbed to Serena once again in the last eight despite having an early lead. In doubles, she partnered with Hingis and they reached the final, losing to Russian duo Ekaterina Makarova and Elena Vesnina in three sets.

In October, Pennetta was seeded 15th at the Wuhan Open; she lost in the first round to Jarmila Gajdošová in straight sets, but won the doubles tournament with Hingis. At the China Open, she defeated Christina McHale in the first round before succumbing to Carla Suárez Navarro in three sets. As the third seed in Moscow, Pennetta once again suffered an opening round loss to Camila Giorgi. She received a wildcard to play in Sofia after the withdrawal of Janković. She turned things around by reaching the final, her second of 2014. In the round-robin stage she overcame Alizé Cornet and Karolína Plíšková in straight sets. She also suffered a loss to Garbiñe Muguruza, despite winning the first set 6–0. Accumulating a record of 2–1, she advanced to the semifinal for the first time since Indian Wells in March where she avenged her loss to Suarez Navarro, claiming the victory in straight sets. She ran out of steam in the final, falling to Andrea Petkovic in three sets, having won the first set 6–1.

=== 2015: Grand Slam title, career-high ranking & retirement ===
The 2015 season started slowly for Pennetta. During the Hopman Cup, she "bagelled" Serena Williams before ultimately losing the match. In the Australian Open, she lost to compatriot Camila Giorgi in the first round, failing to defend her quarterfinalist points from 2014. In the Dubai Premier event she reached the quarterfinals, where she lost to Caroline Wozniacki. As the defending champion at Indian Wells, she managed to reach the quarterfinals, beating Madison Brengle, Sam Stosur, and world No. 2, Maria Sharapova. She lost to Sabine Lisicki in three thrilling sets despite having three match points. At the Miami Open she continued this run, by defeating former world No. 1, Victoria Azarenka, before falling to Simona Halep in the round of 16 in straight sets in a high-class match despite leading 5–2 in the second set.

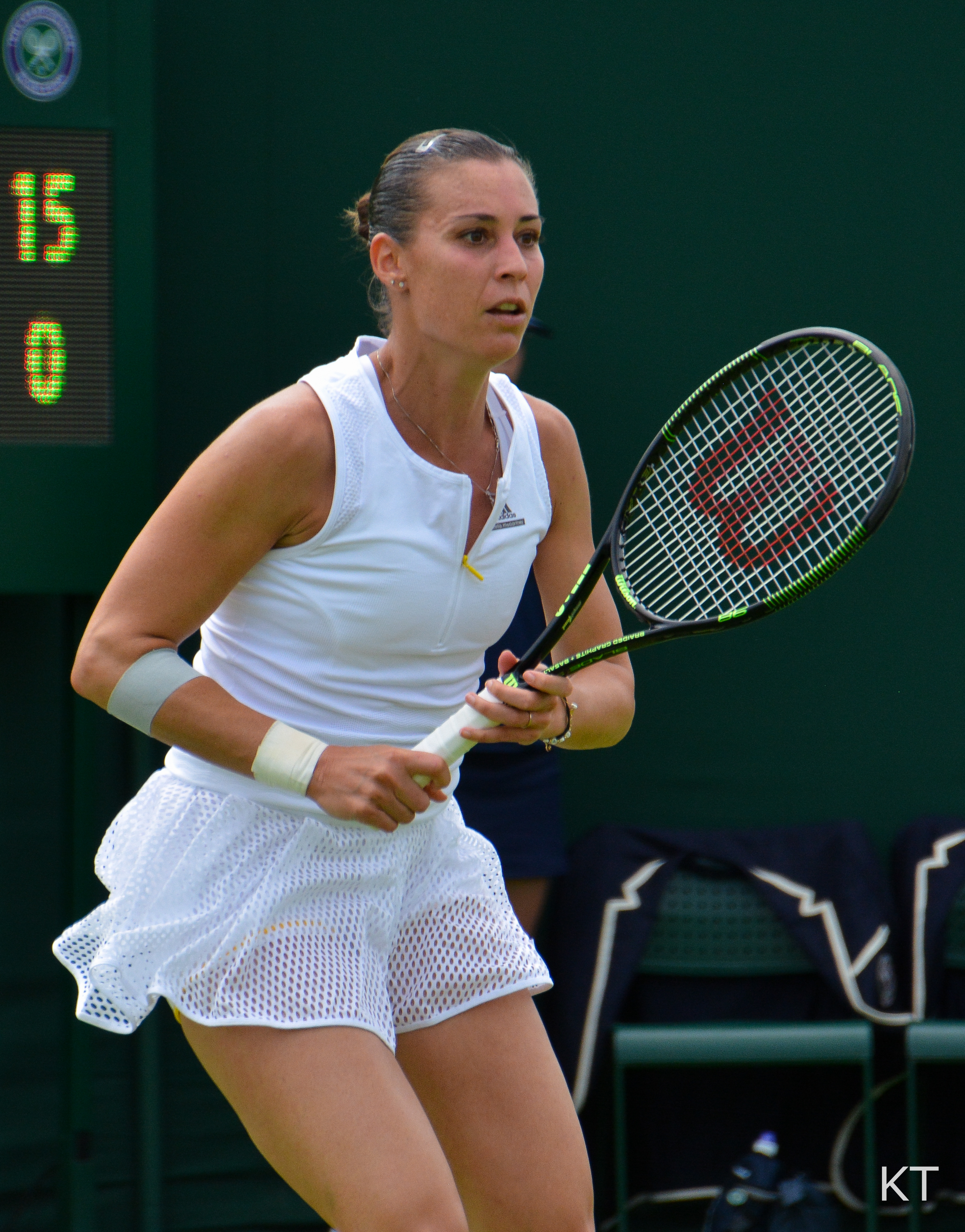
Pennetta at Wimbledon in 2015

Pennetta had mixed results during the clay season. She made it to the quarterfinals in Marrakech, losing to eventual finalist Tímea Babos in three sets. She suffered early exits at both Madrid and Rome to Andrea Petkovic and Elina Svitolina, respectively. Pennetta equalled her best result at the French Open by reaching the fourth round. She beat Carla Suárez Navarro for her second top 10 win before losing to Garbiñe Muguruza in straight sets.

Pennetta went winless during the grass season. She lost in Eastbourne to Svetlana Kuznetsova and at Wimbledon to Zarina Diyas.

In Toronto, Pennetta lost in the second round to Serena Williams in three sets. This was the first time since 2008 that Pennetta had won a set against Williams in an official match. At Cincinnati, Pennetta beat former top-ten player Dominika Cibulková before losing to newly crowned Toronto champion Belinda Bencic in straight sets. In New Haven, Pennetta lost in the first round to last year's finalist, Magdaléna Rybáriková, in three sets.

Pennetta then played at the US Open as the 26th seed. She made it to the quarterfinals for the sixth time in the previous seven attempts by beating Jarmila Gajdošová, Monica Niculescu, Petra Cetkovská and 2011 champion, Samantha Stosur. In the quarterfinals, she came up against two-time Wimbledon champion Petra Kvitová. Pennetta won the match in three sets, after having trailed 1–3 in the second set, to advance to her second US Open semifinal. She then defeated second seed Simona Halep in straight sets to advance to her first Grand Slam final. Pennetta faced Roberta Vinci in the first-ever all-Italian Grand Slam final in the Open Era. Pennetta won the match in straight sets, claiming her first ever US Open title and her first Grand Slam title. During her acceptance speech she announced her retirement. In an interview with Eurosport after the match, Pennetta clarified that she would play out the rest of the season. By virtue of winning the US Open, Pennetta returned to the top 10 for the first time since September 2009. In the weeks following the US Open, she attained a new career-high ranking of No. 6. She qualified for the WTA Finals in Singapore, where she was defeated in the round robin, losing against Halep and defeating Agnieszka Radwańska before going down to Maria Sharapova in the last professional singles match of her career.

Pennetta retired having won 28 career titles in total, including the US Open in singles and Australian Open and WTA Finals in doubles, reaching No. 6 in the world in singles and No. 1 in doubles, and winning the Fed Cup four times between 2006 and 2013.

== Personal life ==
Flavia Pennetta was born in Brindisi to Oronzo and Concetta Pennetta. She has an older sister. She was introduced to tennis at the age of five and has cited Monica Seles as her tennis idol. Pennetta previously dated Carlos Moyá. The two split in 2007, and she wrote of the traumatic breakup in her memoir Dritto al cuore (Straight to the Heart).

Pennetta began dating compatriot ATP tennis player Fabio Fognini in early 2014. Pennetta and Fognini became engaged in 2015, and the two were married in Ostuni in June 2016. Pennetta gave birth to a baby boy in 2017. In 2019, their first daughter was born, and in 2021 she gave birth to a second daughter.

Her cousin is tennis player Claudia Giovine.

Pennetta is a Catholic.

== Equipment ==
- Coach: former professional tennis player from Spain Salvador Navarro, who worked previously for David Ferrer and Tommy Robredo.
- Racket: Wilson BLX Blade 98 16/19
- Clothing: Adidas
- Shoes: Adidas

== Honours ==
- Knight of Order of Merit of the Republic (24 January 2007)

== Career statistics ==
=== Grand Slam finals ===
==== Singles: 1 (1 title) ====
Result	Year	Championship	Surface	Opponent	Score
Win	2015	US Open	Hard	(Italy) Roberta Vinci	7–6^{(7–4)}, 6–2

==== Doubles: 3 (1 title, 2 runner-ups) ====
Result	Year	Championship	Surface	Partner	Opponents	Score
Loss	2005	US Open	Hard	(Russia) Elena Dementieva	(United States) Lisa Raymond (Australia) Samantha Stosur	2–6, 7–5, 3–6
Win	2011	Australian Open	Hard	(Argentina) Gisela Dulko	(Belarus) Victoria Azarenka (Russia) Maria Kirilenko	2–6, 7–5, 6–1
Loss	2014	US Open	Hard	(Switzerland) Martina Hingis	(Russia) Ekaterina Makarova (Russia) Elena Vesnina	6–2, 3–6, 2–6

== Grand Slam performance timelines ==
Key
W	F	SF	QF	#R	RR	Q#	DNQ	A	NH

(W) winner; (F) finalist; (SF) semifinalist; (QF) quarterfinalist; (#R) rounds 4, 3, 2, 1; (RR) round-robin stage; (Q#) qualification round; (DNQ) did not qualify; (A) absent; (NH) not held; (SR) strike rate (events won / competed); (W–L) win–loss record.

=== Singles ===
Tournament	2000	2001	2002	2003	2004	2005	2006	2007	2008	2009	2010	2011	2012	2013	2014	2015	SR	W–L	Win %
Australian Open	A	A	A	1R	1R	1R	3R	1R	2R	3R	2R	4R	1R	A	QF	1R	0 / 12	13–12	52%
French Open	A	A	A	3R	1R	3R	3R	1R	4R	1R	4R	1R	3R	1R	2R	4R	0 / 13	18–13	58%
Wimbledon	Q2	A	Q2	2R	1R	4R	4R	1R	2R	3R	3R	3R	1R	4R	2R	1R	0 / 13	18–13	58%
US Open	A	A	Q1	1R	1R	1R	A	2R	QF	QF	3R	QF	A	SF	QF	W	1 / 11	31–10	76%
Win–loss	0–0	0–0	0–0	3–4	0–4	5–4	7–3	1–4	9–4	8–4	8–4	9–4	2–3	7–3	10–4	10–3	1 / 49	80–48	63%

=== Doubles ===
Tournament	1999–02	2003	2004	2005	2006	2007	2008	2009	2010	2011	2012	2013	2014	2015	SR	W–L
Australian Open	A	1R	1R	2R	3R	3R	QF	3R	QF	W	3R	A	2R	3R	1 / 12	24–11
French Open	A	1R	A	2R	2R	1R	2R	3R	QF	QF	3R	2R	3R	QF	0 / 12	19–12
Wimbledon	A	1R	2R	1R	3R	2R	2R	1R	SF	1R	SF	2R	3R	QF	0 / 13	19–13
US Open	A	1R	3R	F	A	2R	1R	1R	QF	3R	A	3R	F	SF	0 / 11	24–11
Win–loss	0–0	0–4	3–3	7–4	5–3	4–4	5–4	4–4	13–4	11–3	8–3	4–3	10–4	12–4	1 / 48	86–47

== See also ==
- Italy Fed Cup team
- Italy at the 2008 Summer Olympics

Awards and achievements
Preceded by (United States) Serena Williams & (United States) Venus Williams	WTA Doubles Team of the Year (with (Argentina) Gisela Dulko); 2010	Succeeded by (Slovenia) Katarina Srebotnik & (Czech Republic) Květa Peschke
Preceded by (United States) Serena Williams & (United States) Venus Williams	ITF Doubles World Champion (with (Argentina) Gisela Dulko); 2010	Succeeded by (Slovenia) Katarina Srebotnik & (Czech Republic) Květa Peschke
Preceded by (Slovenia) Tina Maze	Gazzetta dello Sport; Sportswoman of the Year; 2015	Succeeded by (United States) Simone Biles
Preceded by Tania Cagnotto	Italian Sportswoman of the Year; 2015	Succeeded by Tania Cagnotto
