= 2009 Barcelona Ladies Open =

- Date: 13–19 April
- Edition: 3rd
- Category: WTA International
- Draw: 32S / 16D
- Prize money: $220,000
- Surface: Clay / outdoor
- Location: Barcelona, Catalonia, Spain
- Venue: David Lloyd Club Turó

Champions

Singles
- (Italy) Roberta Vinci

Doubles
- (Spain) Nuria Llagostera Vives / (Spain) María José Martínez Sánchez
- Barcelona Ladies Open

The 2009 Barcelona Ladies Open was a women's tennis tournament played on outdoor clay courts. It was the third edition of the Barcelona Ladies Open, and it was an International-level tournament on the 2009 WTA Tour. It took place at the David Lloyd Club Turó in Barcelona, Catalonia, Spain, from 13 April until 19 April 2009. Unseeded Roberta Vinci won the singles title.

== Finals ==
=== Singles ===
(Italy) Roberta Vinci defeated (Russia) Maria Kirilenko, 6–0, 6–4

- It was Vinci's only singles title of the year and the 2nd of her career.

=== Doubles ===
(Spain) Nuria Llagostera Vives / (Spain) María José Martínez Sánchez defeated (Romania) Sorana Cîrstea / (Slovenia) Andreja Klepač, 3–6, 6–2, 10–8
