= Barcelona Ladies Open =

Coordinates: 41°22′58″N 2°6′31″E

Tournament information
- Founded: 2003
- Abolished: 2012
- Editions: 10
- Location: Barcelona, Catalonia; Spain
- Venue: David Lloyd Club Turó (2008–2010); Tennis de la Vall d'Hebron (2007, 2011–2012)
- Category: Tier IV (2007–2008); International (2009)
- Surface: Clay / outdoors
- Draw: 32M/32Q/16D
- Prize money: $220,000
- Website: barcelonaladiesopen.com

The Barcelona Ladies Open was a tennis tournament for women held in Barcelona in Catalonia, Spain and was played on outdoor clay courts. It was an International-level tournament on the WTA Tour with total prize money of $220,000.

The tournament began in November 2003 as a $10,000 challenger event on the ITF Women's Circuit. Prize money was increased to $25,000 the following year; in 2005, the event was moved to October with the prize money increasing to $75,000. In 2007, the tournament was upgraded to the Sony Ericsson WTA Tour, becoming a Tier IV played in June, and remained in this classification through 2008. Since 2009, the event has been held in April.

In 2013 the event was cancelled due to financial reasons and replaced on the tour by the Nuremberg Cup in Nuremberg, Germany, held the week before Roland Garros.

== Results ==
=== Singles ===
Year	Champions	Runners-up	Score
↓ ITF event ↓
2003	(Spain) Marta Fraga Pérez	(Federal Republic of Yugoslavia) Ana Ivanovic	6–4, 5–7, 6–4
2004	(Spain) Laura Pous Tió	(Bulgaria) Tsvetana Pironkova	4–6, 7–5, 6–2
2005	(Czech Republic) Kateřina Böhmová	(Spain) María Sánchez Lorenzo	3–6, 6–3, 7–5
2006	(Italy) Tathiana Garbin	(Russia) Ekaterina Ivanova	6–3, 7–5
↓ WTA Tier IV event ↓
2007	(United States) Meghann Shaughnessy	(Romania) Edina Gallovits	6–3, 6–2
2008	(Russia) Maria Kirilenko	(Spain) María José Martínez Sánchez	6–0, 6–2
↓ WTA International event ↓
2009	(Italy) Roberta Vinci	(Russia) Maria Kirilenko	6–0, 6–4
2010	(Italy) Francesca Schiavone	(Italy) Roberta Vinci	6–1, 6–1
2011	(Italy) Roberta Vinci (2)	(Czech Republic) Lucie Hradecká	4–6, 6–2, 6–2
2012	(Italy) Sara Errani	(Slovakia) Dominika Cibulková	6–2, 6–2
succeeded by Nuremberg Cup

=== Doubles ===
Year	Champions	Runners-up	Score
↓ ITF event ↓
2003	(Spain) Marta Fraga Pérez (Spain) Adriana González Peñas	(Spain) Núria Roig (Ukraine) Julia Vakulenko	6–3, 6–3
2004	(Spain) Lourdes Domínguez Lino (Spain) Laura Pous Tió	(Russia) Nina Bratchikova (Russia) Ekaterina Kozhokhina	6–4, 7–6^{(7–4)}
2005	(Spain) Lourdes Domínguez Lino (2) (Spain) María Sánchez Lorenzo	(Spain) Conchita Martínez Granados (Spain) María José Martínez Sánchez	7–5, 6–7^{(4–7)}, 7–6^{(7–3)}
2006	(Poland) Klaudia Jans (Poland) Alicja Rosolska	(Romania) Edina Gallovits (Germany) Vanessa Henke	6–1, 6–2
↓ WTA Tier IV event ↓
2007	(Spain) Nuria Llagostera Vives (Spain) Arantxa Parra Santonja	(Spain) Lourdes Domínguez Lino (Italy) Flavia Pennetta	7–6^{(7–3)}, 2–6, [12–10]
2008	(Spain) Lourdes Domínguez Lino (3) (Spain) Arantxa Parra Santonja (2)	(Spain) Nuria Llagostera Vives (Spain) María José Martínez Sánchez	4–6, 7–5, [10–4]
↓ WTA International event ↓
2009	(Spain) Nuria Llagostera Vives (2) (Spain) María José Martínez Sánchez	(Romania) Sorana Cîrstea (Slovenia) Andreja Klepač	3–6, 6–2, [10–8]
2010	(Italy) Sara Errani (Italy) Roberta Vinci	(Switzerland) Timea Bacsinszky (Italy) Tathiana Garbin	6–1, 3–6, [10–2]
2011	(Czech Republic) Iveta Benešová (Czech Republic) Barbora Záhlavová-Strýcová	(South Africa) Natalie Grandin (Czech Republic) Vladimíra Uhlířová	5–7, 6–4, [11–9]
2012	(Italy) Sara Errani (2) (Italy) Roberta Vinci (2)	(Italy) Flavia Pennetta (Italy) Francesca Schiavone	6–0, 6–2
succeeded by Nuremberg Cup

== See also ==
- Spanish Open
- Barcelona Open
- Barcelona WCT
- List of tennis tournaments
