= Kristina Mladenovic career statistics =

Career finals
Discipline	Type	Won	Lost	Total
Singles	Grand Slam	–	–	–
Singles	WTA Finals (Note: Formerly known as WTA Tour Championships until 2014.)	–	–	–
Singles	WTA 1000	0	1	1
Singles	WTA Tour	1	6	7
Singles	Olympics	–	–	–
Singles	Total	1	7	8
Doubles	Grand Slam	6	4	10
Doubles	WTA Finals	2	0	2
Doubles	WTA 1000	4	4	8
Doubles	WTA Tour	17	7	24
Doubles	Olympics	–	–	–
Doubles	Total	29	15	44
Mixed	Grand Slam	3	3	6
Mixed	Olympics	–	–	–
Mixed	Total	3	3	6

This is a list of the main career statistics of professional tennis player Kristina Mladenovic (Note: French pronunciation: [kʁistina kiki mladɛnɔvitʃ]; Serbian: Кристина "Кики" Младеновић, Kristina "Kiki" Mladenović, pronounced [kristǐːna mlâdenoʋitɕ, – mladěː-]). She has won six major titles in doubles events – Australian Open in 2018 and 2020; French Open in 2016, 2019, 2020 and 2022. And in addition, she won two back-to-back titles at the WTA Finals, in 2018 and 2019, both alongside Tímea Babos. She was part of the France Fed Cup team (now called Billie Jean King Cup) when France won the title in 2019. In singles, she has some significant results such as two major quarterfinals (US Open in 2014 and French Open in 2017) and final of the WTA 1000 Madrid Open in 2017. In the late 2017, she made her debut in the top 10 on the WTA rankings in singles, while in doubles she became world No. 1, right after winning the French Open.

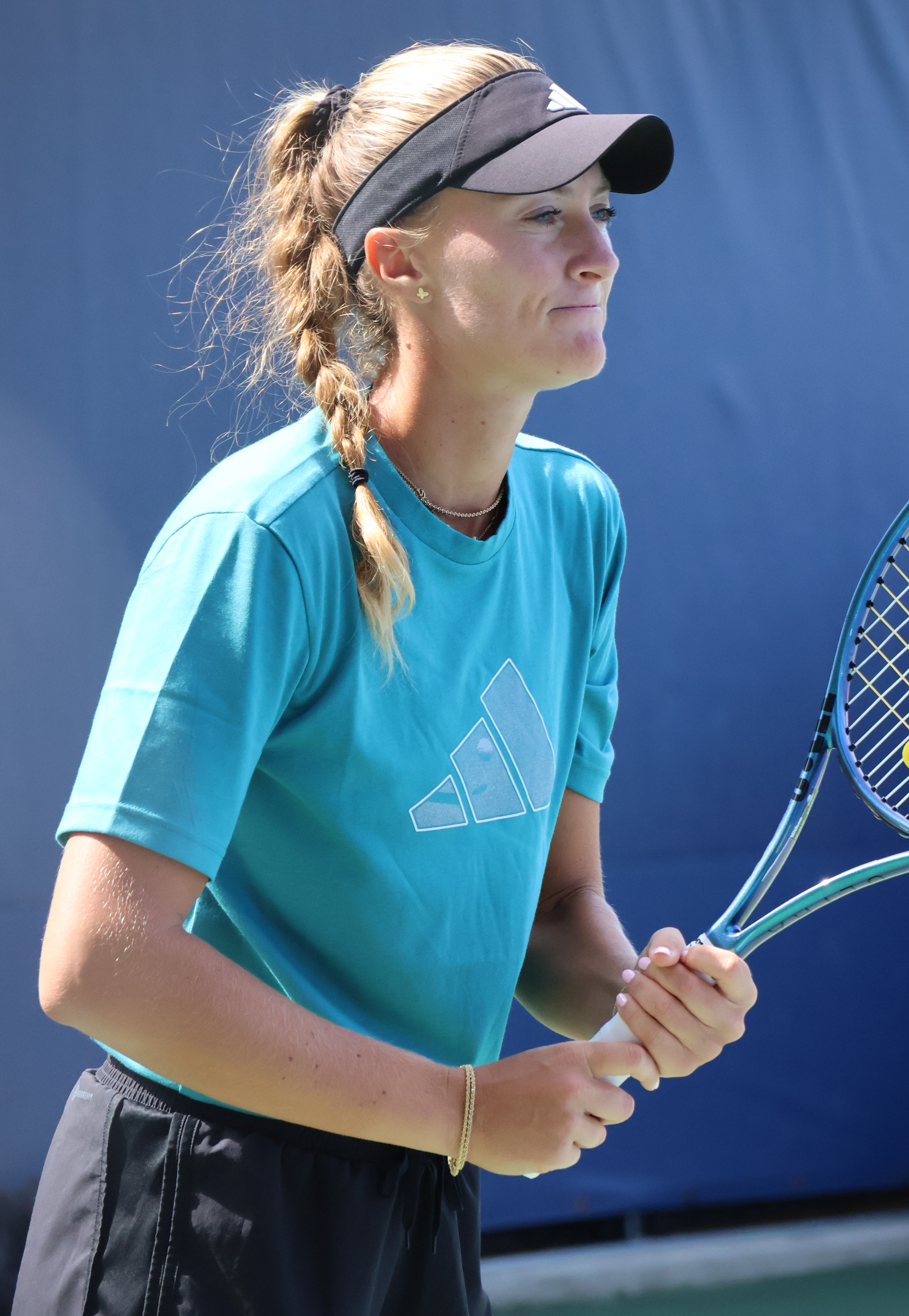
Mladenovic at the 2023 US Open

== Performance timelines ==
Key
W	F	SF	QF	#R	RR	Q#	DNQ	A	NH

(W) winner; (F) finalist; (SF) semifinalist; (QF) quarterfinalist; (#R) rounds 4, 3, 2, 1; (RR) round-robin stage; (Q#) qualification round; (DNQ) did not qualify; (A) absent; (NH) not held; (SR) strike rate (events won / competed); (W–L) win–loss record.
To avoid confusion and double counting, these charts are updated at the conclusion of a tournament or when the player's participation has ended.

Only main-draw results in WTA Tour, Grand Slam tournaments, Billie Jean King Cup, Hopman Cup, United Cup and Olympic Games are included in win–loss records.

=== Singles ===
Current through the 2023 Guadalajara Open.

Tournament	2009	2010	2011	2012	2013	2014	2015	2016	2017	2018	2019	2020	2021	2022	2023	2024	2025	2026	SR	W–L	Win %
Grand Slam tournaments
Australian Open	1R	Q3	Q1	Q2	2R	1R	2R	3R	1R	1R	1R	1R	3R	1R	Q3				0 / 11	6–11	35%
French Open	1R	1R	1R	1R	2R	3R	3R	3R	QF	1R	2R	1R	2R	1R	1R				0 / 15	13–15	46%
Wimbledon	A	A	A	1R	1R	1R	3R	1R	2R	3R	2R	NH	1R	1R	Q1				0 / 10	6–10	38%
US Open	1R	A	Q2	3R	2R	1R	QF	2R	1R	2R	2R	2R	1R	Q1	Q1				0 / 11	11–11	50%
Win–Loss	0–3	0–1	0–1	2–3	3–4	2–4	9–4	5–4	5–4	3–4	3–4	1–3	3–4	0–3	0–1				0 / 47	36–47	43%
Year-end championships
WTA Finals	DNQ								Alt	DNQ									0 / 0	0–0	–
WTA Elite Trophy (Note: Tournament of Champions was held from 2009 to 2014, when WTA Elite Trophy replaced it.)	DNQ								RR	DNQ		NH							0 / 1	0–2	0%
National representation
Billie Jean King Cup (Note: Formerly known as Fed Cup until 2020.)	A	A	A	WG2	WG2	WG2	SF	F	1R	SF	W	A (Note: Edition is split into the two years due to COVID-19.)		QR	RR				1 / 5	11–8	58%
Summer Olympics	NH			A	NH			2R	NH				1R	NH					0 / 2	1–2	33%
WTA 1000 tournaments
Qatar Open	Not Held		NTI	Q1	A	1R	NTI	1R	NTI	2R	NTI	1R	NTI	A	NTI				0 / 4	1–4	
Dubai Championships	A	A	A	Not Tier I			A	NTI	3R	NTI	3R	NTI	2R	NTI	Q2				0 / 3	5–3	63%
Indian Wells Open	A	A	A	A	1R	2R	1R	2R	SF	3R	2R	NH	A	A	A				0 / 7	7–7	50%
Miami Open	A	A	A	A	2R	1R	3R	2R	2R	2R	1R	NH	1R	A	A				0 / 8	3–8	27%
Madrid Open	A	A	A	A	2R	1R	Q1	1R	F	3R	2R	NH	1R	Q2	Q1				0 / 7	9–7	56%
Italian Open	A	A	A	A	1R	Q2	2R	1R	1R	1R	QF	A	2R	A	Q1				0 / 7	5–7	42%
Canadian Open	A	A	A	Q1	1R	Q2	1R	1R	1R	1R	1R	NH	Q2	A	A				0 / 6	0–6	0%
Cincinnati Open	A	A	A	A	1R	Q1	2R	2R	1R	3R	Q1	2R	Q1	A	A				0 / 6	5–6	45%
China Open	A	A	A	A	1R	Q1	1R	2R	1R	1R	2R	Not Held			A				0 / 6	2–6	25%
Wuhan Open (Note: In 2014, the Pan Pacific Open was downgraded to a Premier event and replaced by the Wuhan Open. The Premier 5 tournaments were reclassified as WTA 1000 tournaments in 2021.)	A	A	A	A	1R	Q1	3R	2R	1R	1R	1R	Not Held							0 / 6	3–6	33%
Guadalajara Open	Not Held													A	1R				0 / 1	0–1	0%
Win–Loss	0–0	0–0	0–0	0–0	2–8	1–4	6–7	3–9	11–9	6–9	8–8	1–2	2–4	0–0	0–1				0 / 61	40–61	40%
Career statistics
	2009	2010	2011	2012	2013	2014	2015	2016	2017	2018	2019	2020	2021	2022	2023				Career		
Tournaments	4	2	1	5	25	23	25	29	26	27	23	9	23	8	4				Career total: 234		
Titles	0	0	0	0	0	0	0	0	1	0	0	0	0	0	0				Career total: 1		
Finals	0	0	0	0	0	0	1	2	4	1	0	0	0	0	0				Career total: 8		
Hard win–loss	0–2	0–0	0–0	5–3	14–15	13–16	17–19	17–21	19–21	15–19	19–16	4–7	11–14	1–3	0–2				1 / 152	135–158	46%
Clay win–loss	0–2	1–2	0–1	0–1	5–8	2–5	10–4	7–7	15–4	3–6	7–5	0–2	3–6	2–4	0–2				0 / 55	55–59	48%
Grass win–loss	0–0	0–0	0–0	0–1	2–3	0–2	8–3	7–4	6–4	4–3	3–3	NH	3–3	0–1	0–0				0 / 27	33–27	55%
Overall win–loss	0–4	1–2	0–1	5–5	21–26	15–23	35–26	31–32	40–29	22–28	29–24	4–9	17–23	3–8	0–4				1 / 229	223–244	48%
Win (%)	0%	33%	0%	50%	45%	39%	57%	49%	58%	44%	55%	31%	43%	27%	0%				Career total: 48%		
Year-end ranking (Note: 2008: WTA ranking–1005.)	202	354	183	76	56	81	29	42	11	44	40	49	92	112					$13,378,830		

=== Doubles ===
Current through the 2023 Australian Open.

Tournament	2008	2009	2010	2011	2012	2013	2014	2015	2016	2017	2018	2019	2020	2021	2022	2023	2024	2025	2026	SR	W–L	Win %
Grand Slam tournaments
Australian Open	A	A	A	A	3R	1R	2R	2R	3R	SF	W	F	W	A	2R	2R				2 / 11	29–9	76%
French Open	1R	1R	1R	2R	2R	QF	3R	2R	W	3R	QF	W	W	A	W	2R				4 / 15	38–11	78%
Wimbledon	A	A	A	A	2R	2R	F	SF	QF	QF	QF	SF	NH	1R	A	A				0 / 9	23–9	72%
US Open	A	A	A	A	2R	3R	1R	3R	F	3R	F	QF	2R (Note: Babos and Mladenovic were forced to withdraw before second-round match due to Mladenovic being in contact with Benoît Paire who was tested positive for COVID-19, despite Mladenovic being tested negative multiple times. Their walkover in second round is not counted as loss.)	A	QF	A				0 / 10	24–9	73%
Win–loss	0–1	0–1	0–1	1–1	5–4	6–4	8–4	8–4	16–3	11–4	17–3	17–3	13–0	0–1	10–2	2–2				6 / 45	114–38	75%
National representation
Billie Jean King Cup	A	A	A	A	A	A	A	SF	F	QF	SF	W	A	A						1 / 5	13–2	87%
Summer Olympics	A	NH			1R	NH			1R	NH				1R	NH					0 / 3	0–3	0%
Year-end championships
WTA Finals	DNQ							RR	SF	DNQ	W	W	NH	DNQ						2 / 4	10–3	77%
WTA 1000 tournaments
Qatar Open	A	Not Held		NTI	QF	A	1R	NTI	2R	NTI	QF	NTI	SF	NTI	A	NTI				0 / 5	5–5	50%
Dubai Championships	NTI	A	A	A	Not Tier I			W	NTI	QF	NTI	2R	NTI	A	NTI	2R				1 / 4	7–4	64%
Indian Wells Open	A	A	A	A	1R	1R	2R	1R	A	QF	SF	1R	NH	A	A	A				0 / 7	6–7	46%
Miami Open	A	A	A	A	A	1R	1R	SF	1R	QF	1R	1R	NH	A	A	1R				0 / 8	5–8	38%
Madrid Open	NH	A	A	A	A	SF	1R	SF	W	1R	F	A	NH	A	A	A				1 / 6	14–5	74%
Italian Open	A	A	A	A	A	2R	2R	W	QF	1R	QF	A	A	F	A	A				1 / 7	12–6	67%
Canadian Open	A	A	A	A	W	1R	1R	SF	QF	1R	QF	A	NH	A	A					1 / 7	9–6	60%
Cincinnati Open	NTI	A	A	A	A	1R	F	QF	2R	2R	QF	QF	A	A	A					0 / 7	9–7	56%
Guadalajara Open	NH														A	2R				0 / 1	1–1	50%
China Open	NTI	A	A	A	A	QF	SF	QF	F	A	QF	QF	NH			2R				0 / 7	12–7	63%
Wuhan Open	A	A	A	A	A	1R	2R	2R	2R	A	QF	A	NH							0 / 5	2–5	29%
Career statistics
	2008	2009	2010	2011	2012	2013	2014	2015	2016	2017	2018	2019	2020	2021	2022	2023				Career		
Tournaments	1	1	2	5	12	22	24	21	20	14	16	14	5	4	9	6				Career total: 176		
Titles	0	0	0	0	2	5	1	4	4	0	3	3	2	0	4	0				Career total: 28		
Finals	0	0	0	1	2	6	6	4	8	0	5	4	2	1	4	0				Career total: 43		
Overall win–loss	0–1	0–1	1–2	6–5	17–10	37–17	33–23	41–15	43–16	19–14	38–13	34–11	17–1	4–4	22–5	5–6				28 / 176	275–133	67%
Win (%)	0%	0%	33%	55%	63%	69%	59%	73%	73%	58%	75%	76%	94%	50%	81%	45%				Career total: 67%		
Year-end ranking	–	530	270	100	28	19	17	9	2	26	3	2	3	24	18							

=== Mixed doubles ===
Tournament	2010	2011	2012	2013	2014	2015	2016	2017	2018	2019	2020	2021	2022	…	2024	2025	2026	SR	W–L
Australian Open	A	A	A	A	W	F	A	A	A	2R	A	A	W					2 / 4	15–2
French Open	1R	A	A	F	QF	2R	SF	A	2R	A	NH	A	A					0 / 6	11–6
Wimbledon	A	A	A	W	SF	QF	A	A	A	A	NH	A	A					1 / 3	10–2
US Open	A	A	A	SF	1R	A	A	A	A	A	NH	A	1R					0 / 3	3–3
Win–Loss	0–1	0–0	0–0	12–2	10–3	7–3	3–1	0–0	1–1	1–1	0–0	0–0	5–1	0–0				3 / 16	39–13
National representation
Summer Olympics	NH		A	NH			1R	NH				1R	NH					0 / 2	0–2

== Grand Slam tournament finals ==
=== Doubles: 11 (6 titles, 5 runner-ups) ===
Result	Year	Tournament	Surface	Partner	Opponents	Score
Loss	2014	Wimbledon	Grass	(Hungary) Tímea Babos	(Italy) Sara Errani (Italy) Roberta Vinci	1–6, 3–6
Win	2016	French Open	Clay	(France) Caroline Garcia	(Russia) Ekaterina Makarova (Russia) Elena Vesnina	6–3, 2–6, 6–4
Loss	2016	US Open	Hard	(France) Caroline Garcia	(United States) Bethanie Mattek-Sands (Czech Republic) Lucie Šafářová	6–2, 6–7^{(5–7)}, 4–6
Win	2018	Australian Open	Hard	(Hungary) Tímea Babos	(Russia) Ekaterina Makarova (Russia) Elena Vesnina	6–4, 6–3
Loss	2018	US Open	Hard	(Hungary) Tímea Babos	(Australia) Ashleigh Barty (United States) CoCo Vandeweghe	6–3, 6–7^{(2–7)}, 6–7^{(6–8)}
Loss	2019	Australian Open	Hard	(Hungary) Tímea Babos	(Australia) Samantha Stosur (China) Zhang Shuai	3–6, 4–6
Win	2019	French Open (2)	Clay	(Hungary) Tímea Babos	(China) Duan Yingying (China) Zheng Saisai	6–2, 6–3
Win	2020	Australian Open (2)	Hard	(Hungary) Tímea Babos	(Chinese Taipei) Hsieh Su-wei (Czech Republic) Barbora Strýcová	6–2, 6–1
Win	2020	French Open (3)	Clay	(Hungary) Tímea Babos	(Chile) Alexa Guarachi (United States) Desirae Krawczyk	6–4, 7–5
Win	2022	French Open (4)	Clay	(France) Caroline Garcia	(United States) Coco Gauff (United States) Jessica Pegula	2–6, 6–3, 6–2
Loss	2024	US Open	Hard	(China) Zhang Shuai	(Latvia) Jeļena Ostapenko (Ukraine) Lyudmyla Kichenok	4–6, 3–6

=== Mixed doubles: 6 (3 titles, 3 runner-ups) ===
Result	Year	Tournament	Surface	Partner	Opponents	Score
Loss	2013	French Open	Clay	(Canada) Daniel Nestor	(Czech Republic) Lucie Hradecká; (Czech Republic) František Čermák	6–1, 4–6, [6–10]
Win	2013	Wimbledon	Grass	(Canada) Daniel Nestor	(Brazil) Bruno Soares; (United States) Lisa Raymond	5–7, 6–2, 8–6
Win	2014	Australian Open	Hard	(Canada) Daniel Nestor	(India) Sania Mirza; (Romania) Horia Tecău	6–3, 6–2
Loss	2015	Australian Open	Hard	(Canada) Daniel Nestor	(Switzerland) Martina Hingis; (India) Leander Paes	4–6, 3–6
Win	2022	Australian Open (2)	Hard	(Croatia) Ivan Dodig	(Australia) Jaimee Fourlis (Australia) Jason Kubler	6–3, 6–4
Loss	2026	Australian Open	Hard	(France) Manuel Guinard	(Australia) Olivia Gadecki (Australia) John Peers	6–4, 3–6, [10–8]

== Other significant finals ==
=== Year-end championships ===
==== Doubles: 2 (2 titles) ====
Result	Year	Tournament	Surface	Partner	Opponents	Score
Win	2018	WTA Finals, Singapore	Hard (i)	(Hungary) Tímea Babos	(Czech Republic) Barbora Krejčíková (Czech Republic) Kateřina Siniaková	6–4, 7–5
Win	2019	WTA Finals, Shenzhen (2)	Hard (i)	(Hungary) Tímea Babos	(Chinese Taipei) Hsieh Su-wei (Czech Republic) Barbora Strýcová	6–1, 6–3

=== WTA 1000 tournaments ===
==== Singles: 1 (runner-up) ====
Result	Year	Tournament	Surface	Opponent	Score
Loss	2017	Madrid Open	Clay	(Romania) Simona Halep	5–7, 7–6^{(7–5)}, 2–6

==== Doubles: 8 (4 titles, 4 runner-ups) ====
Result	Year	Tournament	Surface	Partner	Opponents	Score
Win	2012	Canadian Open	Hard	(Poland) Klaudia Jans-Ignacik	(Russia) Nadia Petrova (Slovenia) Katarina Srebotnik	7–5, 2–6, [10–7]
Loss	2014	Cincinnati Open	Hard	(Hungary) Tímea Babos	(United States) Raquel Kops-Jones (United States) Abigail Spears	1–6, 0–2 ret.
Win	2015	Dubai Championships	Hard	(Hungary) Tímea Babos	(Spain) Garbiñe Muguruza (Spain) Carla Suárez Navarro	6–3, 6–2
Win	2015	Italian Open	Clay	(Hungary) Tímea Babos	(Switzerland) Martina Hingis (India) Sania Mirza	6–4, 6–3
Win	2016	Madrid Open	Clay	(France) Caroline Garcia	(Switzerland) Martina Hingis (India) Sania Mirza	6–4, 6–4
Loss	2016	China Open	Hard	(France) Caroline Garcia	(United States) Bethanie Mattek-Sands (Czech Republic) Lucie Šafářová	4–6, 4–6
Loss	2018	Madrid Open	Clay	(Hungary) Tímea Babos	(Russia) Ekaterina Makarova (Russia) Elena Vesnina	6–2, 4–6, [8–10]
Loss	2021	Italian Open	Clay	(Czech Republic) Markéta Vondroušová	(Canada) Sharon Fichman (Mexico) Giuliana Olmos	6–4, 5–7, [5–10]

== WTA Tour finals ==
=== Singles: 8 (1 title, 7 runner-ups) ===
Legend
Premier M (0–1)
Premier (1–2)
International (0–4)

Result	W–L	Date	Tournament	Tier	Surface	Opponent	Score
Loss	0–1	May 2015	Internationaux de Strasbourg, France	International	Clay	(Australia) Samantha Stosur	6–3, 2–6, 3–6
Loss	0–2	Jun 2016	Rosmalen Open, Netherlands	International	Grass	(United States) CoCo Vandeweghe	5–7, 5–7
Loss	0–3	Oct 2016	Hong Kong Open, China S.A.R.	International	Hard	(Denmark) Caroline Wozniacki	1–6, 7–6^{(7–4)}, 2–6
Win	1–3	Feb 2017	St. Petersburg Trophy, Russia	Premier	Hard (i)	(Kazakhstan) Yulia Putintseva	6–2, 6–7^{(3–7)}, 6–4
Loss	1–4	Mar 2017	Abierto Mexicano, Mexico	International	Hard	(Ukraine) Lesia Tsurenko	1–6, 5–7
Loss	1–5	Apr 2017	Stuttgart Grand Prix, Germany	Premier	Clay (i)	(Germany) Laura Siegemund	1–6, 6–2, 6–7^{(5–7)}
Loss	1–6	May 2017	Madrid Open, Spain	Premier M	Clay	(Romania) Simona Halep	5–7, 7–6^{(7–5)}, 2–6
Loss	1–7	Feb 2018	St. Petersburg Trophy, Russia	Premier	Hard (i)	(Czech Republic) Petra Kvitová	1–6, 2–6

=== Doubles: 49 (31 titles, 18 runner-ups) ===
Legend Grand Slam (7–4) WTA Finals (2–0) Premier 5 & M / WTA 1000 (4–4) Premier / WTA 500 (4–6) International / WTA 250 (14–3)	Finals by surface Hard (15–13) Grass (2–2) Clay (14–3)

Result	W–L	Date	Tournament	Tier	Surface	Partner	Opponents	Score
Loss	0–1	Jun 2011	Danish Open, Denmark	International	Hard	(Poland) Katarzyna Piter	(Sweden) Johanna Larsson (Germany) Jasmin Wöhr	3–6, 3–6
Win	1–1	Aug 2012	Canadian Open, Canada	Premier 5	Hard	(Poland) Klaudia Jans-Ignacik	(Russia) Nadia Petrova (Slovenia) Katarina Srebotnik	7–5, 2–6, [10–7]
Win	2–1	Sep 2012	Tournoi de Québec, Canada	International	Hard	(Germany) Tatjana Malek	(Poland) Alicja Rosolska (United Kingdom) Heather Watson	7–6^{(7–5)}, 6–7^{(6–8)}, [10–7]
Win	3–1	Feb 2013	Memphis Indoors, US	International	Hard (i)	(Kazakhstan) Galina Voskoboeva	(Sweden) Sofia Arvidsson (Sweden) Johanna Larsson	7–6^{(7–5)}, 6–3
Win	4–1	Apr 2013	Charleston Open, US	Premier	Clay (green)	(Czech Republic) Lucie Šafářová	(Czech Republic) Andrea Hlaváčková (United States) Liezel Huber	6–3, 7–6^{(8–6)}
Loss	4–2	Apr 2013	Rabat Grand Prix, Morocco	International	Clay	(Croatia) Petra Martić	(Hungary) Tímea Babos (Luxembourg) Mandy Minella	3–6, 1–6
Win	5–2	May 2013	Estoril Open, Portugal	International	Clay	(Chinese Taipei) Chan Hao-ching	(Croatia) Darija Jurak (Hungary) Katalin Marosi	7–6^{(7–3)}, 6–2
Win	6–2	Jul 2013	Palermo Ladies Open, Italy	International	Clay	(Poland) Katarzyna Piter	(Czech Republic) Karolína Plíšková (Czech Republic) Kristýna Plíšková	6–1, 5–7, [10–8]
Win	7–2	Oct 2013	Japan Women's Open	International	Hard	(Italy) Flavia Pennetta	(Australia) Samantha Stosur (China) Zhang Shuai	6–4, 6–3
Loss	7–3	Jan 2014	Brisbane International, Australia	Premier	Hard	(Kazakhstan) Galina Voskoboeva	(Russia) Alla Kudryavtseva (Australia) Anastasia Rodionova	3–6, 1–6
Loss	7–4	Feb 2014	Open GDF Suez, France	Premier	Hard (i)	(Hungary) Tímea Babos	(Germany) Anna-Lena Grönefeld (Czech Republic) Květa Peschke	7–6^{(9–7)}, 4–6, [5–10]
Win	8–4	Mar 2014	Abierto Mexicano, Mexico	International	Hard	(Kazakhstan) Galina Voskoboeva	(Czech Republic) Petra Cetkovská (Czech Republic) Iveta Melzer	6–3, 2–6, [10–5]
Loss	8–5	Jun 2014	Rosmalen Open, Netherlands	International	Grass	(Netherlands) Michaëlla Krajicek	(New Zealand) Marina Erakovic (Spain) Arantxa Parra Santonja	6–0, 6–7^{(5–7)}, [8–10]
Loss	8–6	Jul 2014	Wimbledon Championships, UK	Grand Slam	Grass	(Hungary) Tímea Babos	(Italy) Sara Errani (Italy) Roberta Vinci	1–6, 3–6
Loss	8–7	Aug 2014	Cincinnati Open, US	Premier 5	Hard	(Hungary) Tímea Babos	(United States) Raquel Kops-Jones (United States) Abigail Spears	2–6, 0–2 ret.
Win	9–7	Feb 2015	Dubai Championships, UAE	Premier 5	Hard	(Hungary) Tímea Babos	(Spain) Garbiñe Muguruza (Spain) Carla Suárez Navarro	6–3, 6–2
Win	10–7	May 2015	Rabat Grand Prix, Morocco	International	Clay	(Hungary) Tímea Babos	(Germany) Laura Siegemund (Ukraine) Maryna Zanevska	6–1, 7–6^{(7–5)}
Win	11–7	May 2015	Italian Open, Italy	Premier 5	Clay	(Hungary) Tímea Babos	(Switzerland) Martina Hingis (India) Sania Mirza	6–4, 6–3
Win	12–7	Aug 2015	Washington Open, US	International	Hard	(Switzerland) Belinda Bencic	(Spain) Lara Arruabarrena (Slovenia) Andreja Klepač	7–5, 7–6^{(9–7)}
Loss	12–8	Jan 2016	Sydney International, Australia	Premier	Hard	(France) Caroline Garcia	(Switzerland) Martina Hingis (India) Sania Mirza	6–1, 5–7, [5–10]
Loss	12–9	Feb 2016	Dubai Championships, UAE	Premier	Hard	(France) Caroline Garcia	(Chinese Taipei) Chuang Chia-jung (Croatia) Darija Jurak	4–6, 4–6
Win	13–9	Apr 2016	Charleston Open, US (2)	Premier	Clay (green)	(France) Caroline Garcia	(United States) Bethanie Mattek-Sands (Czech Republic) Lucie Šafářová	6–2, 7–5
Win	14–9	Apr 2016	Stuttgart Grand Prix, Germany	Premier	Clay (i)	(France) Caroline Garcia	(Switzerland) Martina Hingis (India) Sania Mirza	2–6, 6–1, [10–6]
Win	15–9	May 2016	Madrid Open, Spain	Premier M	Clay	(France) Caroline Garcia	(Switzerland) Martina Hingis (India) Sania Mirza	6–4, 6–4
Win	16–9	Jun 2016	French Open, France	Grand Slam	Clay	(France) Caroline Garcia	(Russia) Ekaterina Makarova (Russia) Elena Vesnina	6–3, 2–6, 6–4
Loss	16–10	Sep 2016	US Open, United States	Grand Slam	Hard	(France) Caroline Garcia	(United States) Bethanie Mattek-Sands (Czech Republic) Lucie Šafářová	6–2, 6–7^{(5–7)}, 4–6
Loss	16–11	Oct 2016	China Open, China	Premier M	Hard	(France) Caroline Garcia	(United States) Bethanie Mattek-Sands (Czech Republic) Lucie Safarova	4–6, 4–6
Win	17–11	Jan 2018	Australian Open, Australia	Grand Slam	Hard	(Hungary) Tímea Babos	(Russia) Ekaterina Makarova (Russia) Elena Vesnina	6–4, 6–3
Loss	17–12	May 2018	Madrid Open, Spain	Premier M	Clay	(Hungary) Tímea Babos	(Russia) Ekaterina Makarova (Russia) Elena Vesnina	6–2, 4–6, [8–10]
Win	18–12	Jun 2018	Birmingham Classic, UK	Premier	Grass	(Hungary) Tímea Babos	(Belgium) Elise Mertens (Netherlands) Demi Schuurs	4–6, 6–3, [10–8]
Loss	18–13	Sep 2018	US Open, United States	Grand Slam	Hard	(Hungary) Tímea Babos	(Australia) Ashleigh Barty (United States) CoCo Vandeweghe	6–3, 6–7^{(2–7)}, 6–7^{(6–8)}
Win	19–13	Oct 2018	WTA Finals, Singapore	Finals	Hard	(Hungary) Tímea Babos	(Czech Republic) Barbora Krejčíková (Czech Republic) Kateřina Siniaková	6–4, 7–5
Loss	19–14	Jan 2019	Australian Open, Australia	Grand Slam	Hard	(Hungary) Tímea Babos	(Australia) Samantha Stosur (China) Zhang Shuai	3–6, 4–6
Win	20–14	Apr 2019	İstanbul Cup, Turkey	International	Clay	(Hungary) Tímea Babos	(Chile) Alexa Guarachi (United States) Sabrina Santamaria	6–1, 6–0
Win	21–14	Jun 2019	French Open, France (2)	Grand Slam	Clay	(Hungary) Tímea Babos	(China) Duan Yingying (China) Zheng Saisai	6–2, 6–3
Win	22–14	Nov 2019	WTA Finals, China (2)	Finals	Hard (i)	(Hungary) Tímea Babos	(Chinese Taipei) Hsieh Su-wei (Czech Republic) Barbora Strýcová	6–1, 6–3
Win	23–14	Jan 2020	Australian Open (2)	Grand Slam	Hard	(Hungary) Tímea Babos	(Chinese Taipei) Hsieh Su-wei (Czech Republic) Barbora Strýcová	6–2, 6–1
Win	24–14	Oct 2020	French Open, France (3)	Grand Slam	Clay	(Hungary) Tímea Babos	(Chile) Alexa Guarachi (United States) Desirae Krawczyk	6–4, 7–5
Loss	24–15	May 2021	Italian Open, Italy	WTA 1000	Clay	(Czech Republic) Markéta Vondroušová	(Canada) Sharon Fichman (Mexico) Giuliana Olmos	6–4, 5–7, [5–10]
Win	25–15	Jun 2022	French Open, France (4)	Grand Slam	Clay	(France) Caroline Garcia	(United States) Coco Gauff (United States) Jessica Pegula	2–6, 6–3, 6–2
Win	26–15	Jul 2022	Ladies Open Lausanne, Switzerland	WTA 250	Clay	(Serbia) Olga Danilović	(Norway) Ulrikke Eikeri (Slovenia) Tamara Zidanšek	w/o
Win	27–15	Sep 2022	Korea Open, South Korea	WTA 250	Hard	(Belgium) Yanina Wickmayer	(United States) Asia Muhammad (United States) Sabrina Santamaria	6–3, 6–2
Win	28–15	Oct 2022	Jasmin Open, Tunisia	WTA 250	Hard	(Czech Republic) Kateřina Siniaková	(Japan) Miyu Kato (United States) Angela Kulikov	6–2, 6–0
Loss	28–16	Jan 2024	Adelaide International, Australia	WTA 500	Hard	(France) Caroline Garcia	(Brazil) Beatriz Haddad Maia (United States) Taylor Townsend	5–7, 3–6
Loss	28–17	Sep 2024	US Open, United States	Grand Slam	Hard	(China) Zhang Shuai	(Latvia) Jeļena Ostapenko (Ukraine) Lyudmyla Kichenok	4–6, 3–6
Loss	28–18	Feb 2025	Abu Dhabi Open, UAE	WTA 500	Hard	(China) Zhang Shuai	(Latvia) Jelena Ostapenko (Australia) Ellen Perez	2–6, 1–6
Win	29–18	Oct 2025	Japan Women's Open	WTA 250	Hard	(United States) Taylor Townsend	(Australia) Storm Hunter (United States) Desirae Krawczyk	6–4, 2–6, [10–5]
Win	30–18	Jan 2026	Auckland Open, New Zealand	WTA 250	Hard	(China) Guo Hanyu	(China) Xu Yifan (China) Yang Zhaoxuan	7–6^{(9–7)}, 6–1
Win	31–18	Jul 2026	Wimbledon Championships, UK	Grand Slam	Grass	(China) Guo Hanyu	(Canada) Gabriela Dabrowski (Brazil) Luisa Stefani	6–3, 7–5

== WTA 125 finals ==
=== Singles: 3 (1 title, 2 runner-ups) ===
Result	W–L	Date	Tournament	Surface	Opponent	Score
Win	1–0	Nov 2012	Taipei Ladies Open, Taiwan	Carpet (i)	(Chinese Taipei) Chang Kai-chen	6–4, 6–3
Loss	1–1	Nov 2014	Open de Limoges, France	Hard (i)	(Czech Republic) Tereza Smitková	6–7^{(4–7)}, 5–7
Loss	1–2	Dec 2021	Korea Open, South Korea	Hard (i)	(China) Zhu Lin	0–6, 4–6

=== Doubles: 8 (4 titles, 4 runner-ups) ===
Result	W–L	Date	Tournament	Surface	Partner	Opponents	Score
Win	1–0	Nov 2012	Taipei Ladies Open, Taiwan	Carpet (i)	(Chinese Taipei) Chan Hao-ching	(Chinese Taipei) Chang Kai-chen (Belarus) Olga Govortsova	5–7, 6–2, [10–8]
Loss	1–1	Nov 2014	Open de Limoges, France	Hard (i)	(Hungary) Tímea Babos	(Czech Republic) Kateřina Siniaková (Czech Republic) Renata Voráčová	6–2, 2–6, [5–10]
Win	2–1	May 2022	Trophée Clarins, France	Clay	(Brazil) Beatriz Haddad Maia	(Georgia (country)) Oksana Kalashnikova (Japan) Miyu Kato	5–7, 6–4, [10–4]
Loss	2–2	Apr 2024	Oeiras Ladies Open, Portugal	Clay	(United Kingdom) Harriet Dart	(Portugal) Francisca Jorge (Portugal) Matilde Jorge	0–6, 4–6
Win	3–2	Nov 2024	Cali Open, Colombia	Clay	(Slovenia) Veronika Erjavec	(Ukraine) Katarina Zavatska (Croatia) Tara Würth	6–2, 7–6^{(4)}
Loss	3–3	Nov 2024	Copa Colina, Chile	Clay	(France) Léolia Jeanjean	(Egypt) Mayar Sherif (Serbia) Nina Stojanović	walkover
Win	4–3	Apr 2026	Oeiras Ladies Open, Portugal	Clay	(Slovenia) Veronika Erjavec	(Switzerland) Naïma Karamoko (Latvia) Darja Semeņistaja	6–2, 7–5
Loss	4–4	Jun 2026	Figueira da Foz Open, Portugal	Hard	(Australia) Elena Micic	(Slovakia) Viktória Hrunčáková (Slovakia) Katarína Kužmová	4–6, 4–6

== ITF Circuit finals ==
=== Singles: 11 (6 titles, 5 runner-ups) ===
Legend
$100,000 tournaments (0–1)
$75,000 tournaments (0–1)
$50/60,000 tournaments (3–1)
$40,000 tournaments (0–1)
$25,000 tournaments (3–0)
$10,000 tournaments (0–1)

Result	W–L	Date	Tournament	Tier	Surface	Opponent	Score
Loss	0–1	Apr 2009	ITF San Severo, Italy	W10	Clay	(Poland) Anna Korzeniak	3–6, 1–6
Win	1–1	Feb 2011	ITF Sutton, UK	W25	Hard (i)	(Germany) Mona Barthel	6–3, 1–6, 6–2
Win	2–1	Feb 2011	ITF Stockholm, Sweden	W25	Hard (i)	(Netherlands) Arantxa Rus	6–3, 6–4
Win	3–1	Jun 2011	ITF Padova, Italy	W25	Clay	(Italy) Karin Knapp	3–6, 6–4, 6–0
Loss	3–2	Dec 2011	Dubai Tennis Challenge, UAE	W75	Hard	(Thailand) Noppawan Lertcheewakarn	5–7, 4–6
Win	4–2	Dec 2011	Ankara Cup, Turkey	W50	Hard (i)	(Russia) Valeria Savinykh	7–5, 5–7, 6–1
Win	5–2	Jun 2022	Internazionali di Caserta, Italy	W60	Clay	(Italy) Camilla Rosatello	6–4, 4–6, 7–6^{(7–3)}
Win	6–2	Oct 2022	Monastir Open, Tunisia	W60	Hard	(Slovenia) Tamara Zidanšek	6–1, 3–6, 7–5
Loss	6–3	Jul 2023	ITF Porto, Portugal	W40	Hard	(Bulgaria) Isabella Shinikova	4–6, 5–7
Loss	6–4	Dec 2023	Trnava Indoor, Slovakia	W60	Hard (i)	(Australia) Arina Rodionova	6–7^{(1–7)}, 7–5, 1–6
Loss	6–5	Jul 2024	Figueira da Foz Open, Portugal	W100	Hard	(Russia) Anastasia Zakharova	2–6, 1–6

=== Doubles: 14 (12 titles, 2 runner-ups) ===
Legend
$100,000 tournaments (3–1)
$50,000 tournaments (1–0)
$40,000 tournaments (1–0)
$25/35,000 tournaments (6–1)
$10,000 tournaments (1–0)

Result	W–L	Date	Tournament	Tier	Surface	Partner	Opponents	Score
Win	1–0	Apr 2009	ITF San Severo, Italy	W10	Clay	(Netherlands) Marlot Meddens	(Italy) Anastasia Grymalska (Italy) Lara Meccico	7–6^{(7–3)}, 6–0
Loss	1–1	May 2010	Open de Cagnes-sur-Mer, France	W100	Clay	(France) Stéphanie Cohen-Aloro	(Bosnia and Herzegovina) Mervana Jugić-Salkić (Croatia) Darija Jurak	6–0, 2–6, [5–10]
Loss	1–2	Oct 2010	ITF Helsinki, Finland	W25	Hard (i)	(Ukraine) Yuliya Beygelzimer	(Netherlands) Kiki Bertens (Netherlands) Richèl Hogenkamp	3–6, 5–7
Win	2–2	Apr 2011	ITF Casablanca, Morocco	W25	Clay	(Austria) Sandra Klemenschits	(Poland) Magda Linette (Poland) Katarzyna Piter	6–3, 3–6, [10–8]
Win	3–2	Jun 2011	ITF Padova, Italy	W25	Clay	(Poland) Katarzyna Piter	(Ukraine) Irina Buryachok (Hungary) Réka Luca Jani	6–4, 6–3
Win	4–2	Oct 2011	GB Pro-Series Glasgow, UK	W25	Hard (i)	(Finland) Emma Laine	(Austria) Yvonne Meusburger (Liechtenstein) Stephanie Vogt	6–2, 6–4
Win	5–2	Nov 2011	Open Nantes, France	W50	Hard (i)	(France) Stéphanie Foretz Gacon	(France) Julie Coin (Czech Republic) Eva Hrdinová	6–0, 6–4
Win	6–2	Nov 2011	ITF Opole, Poland	W25	Carpet (i)	(United Kingdom) Naomi Broady	(Poland) Paula Kania (Poland) Magda Linette	7–6, 6–4
Win	7–2	Nov 2011	Bratislava Open, Slovakia	W25	Hard (i)	(United Kingdom) Naomi Broady	(Czech Republic) Karolína Plíšková (Czech Republic) Kristýna Plíšková	5–7, 6–4, [10–2]
Win	8–2	Dec 2022	Dubai Tennis Challenge, UAE	W100	Hard	(Hungary) Tímea Babos	(Poland) Magdalena Fręch (Ukraine) Kateryna Volodko	6–1, 6–3
Win	9–2	Jul 2023	ITF The Hague, Netherlands	W40	Clay	(Netherlands) Arantxa Rus	(Netherlands) Jasmijn Gimbrère (Netherlands) Isabelle Haverlag	6–4, 6–0
Win	10–2	Oct 2023	Shenzhen Longhua Open, China	W100	Hard	(Japan) Moyuka Uchijima	(Hungary) Tímea Babos (Ukraine) Kateryna Volodko	6–2, 7–5
Win	11–2	Mar 2024	ITF Alaminos, Cyprus	W35	Clay	(Croatia) Tena Lukas	(Malta) Francesca Curmi (Romania) Cristina Dinu	6–4, 7–5
Win	12–2	Jun 2024	Ilkley Trophy, United Kingdom	W100	Grass	(Romania) Elena-Gabriela Ruse	(United States) Quinn Gleason (China) Tang Qianhui	6–2, 6–2

== Team competition ==
Result	Date	Tournament	Surface	Partners	Opponents	Score
Loss	Nov 2016	Fed Cup, France	Hard (i)	(France) Caroline Garcia (France) Alizé Cornet (France) Pauline Parmentier	(Czech Republic) Karolína Plíšková (Czech Republic) Lucie Hradecká (Czech Republic) Petra Kvitová (Czech Republic) Barbora Strýcová	2–3
Win	Jan 2017	Hopman Cup, Australia	Hard	(France) Richard Gasquet	(United States) Jack Sock (United States) CoCo Vandeweghe	2–1
Win	Nov 2019	Fed Cup, Australia	Hard	(France) Caroline Garcia (France) Alizé Cornet (France) Pauline Parmentier	(Australia) Ashleigh Barty (Australia) Ajla Tomljanović (Australia) Samantha Stosur (Australia) Astra Sharma	3–2

== Junior Grand Slam finals ==
=== Singles: 2 (1 title, 1 runner-up) ===
Result	Year	Tournament	Surface	Opponent	Score
Win	2009	French Open	Clay	(Russia) Daria Gavrilova	6–3, 6–2
Loss	2009	Wimbledon	Grass	(Thailand) Noppawan Lertcheewakarn	6–3, 3–6, 1–6

== WTA Tour career earnings ==
current as of 23 May 2022

Year	Grand Slam singles titles	WTA singles titles	Total singles titles	Earnings ($)	Money list rank
2012	0	0	0	286,087	81
2013	0	0	0	653,771	38
2014	0	0	0	727,724	36
2015	0	0	0	1,426,592	22
2016	0	0	0	1,537,799	19
2017	0	1	1	2,099,214	17
2018	0	0	0	2,041,210	19
2019	0	0	0	1,982,602	20
2020	0	0	0	800,473	17
2021	0	0	0	552,155	69
2022	0	0	0	180,270	105
Career	0	1	1	12,539,315	39

== Career Grand Slam statistics ==
=== Grand Slam seedings ===
The tournaments won by Mladenovic are in boldface, and advanced into finals by Mladenovic are in italics.

==== Singles ====
Year	Australian Open	French Open	Wimbledon	US Open
2009	wildcard	wildcard	did not play	wildcard
2010	did not qualify	wildcard	did not play	did not play
2011	did not qualify	wildcard	did not play	did not qualify
2012	did not qualify	wildcard	qualifier	wildcard
2013	not seeded	not seeded	not seeded	not seeded
2014	not seeded	not seeded	not seeded	not seeded
2015	not seeded	not seeded	not seeded	not seeded
2016	28th	26th	31st	not seeded
2017	not seeded	13th	12th	14th
2018	11th	29th	not seeded	not seeded
2019	not seeded	not seeded	not seeded	not seeded
2020	not seeded	not seeded	cancelled	30th
2021	not seeded	not seeded	not seeded	not seeded
2022	not seeded	not seeded	not seeded	did not qualify

==== Doubles ====
Year	Australian Open	French Open	Wimbledon	US Open
2008	did not play	wildcard	did not play	did not play
2009	did not play	wildcard	did not play	did not play
2010	did not play	wildcard	did not play	did not play
2011	did not play	wildcard	did not play	did not play
2012	not seeded	not seeded	not seeded	15th
2013	not seeded	10th	10th	14th
2014	12th	12th	14th (1)	7th
2015	10th	3rd	4th	3rd
2016	3rd	**5th (1)**	2nd	1st (2)
2017	1st	14th	not seeded	13th
2018	**5th (2)**	1st	1st	2nd (3)
2019	2nd (4)	**2nd (3)**	1st	1st
2020	**2nd (4)**	**2nd (5)**	cancelled	1st
2021	did not play	did not play	2nd	did not play
2022	not seeded	**wildcard** **(6)**	did not play	14th

== Wins against top 10 players ==
#	Player	Rank	Event	Surface	Rd	Score	MRk
2013
1.	(Czech Republic) Petra Kvitová	8	Open GdF Suez, France	Hard	QF	6–3, 6–4	
2014
2.	(Romania) Simona Halep	10	Open GdF Suez, France	Hard	1R	7–6^{(7–1)}, 6–4	
3.	(China) Li Na	2	French Open, France	Clay	1R	7–5, 3–6, 6–1	
2015
4.	(Canada) Eugenie Bouchard	6	French Open, France	Clay	1R	6–4, 6–4	
5.	(Romania) Simona Halep	3	Birmingham Classic, UK	Grass	QF	2–6, 6–0, 7–6^{(7–4)}	
2016
6.	(Switzerland) Belinda Bencic	8	Rosmalen Open, Netherlands	Grass	SF	2–6, 6–3, 6–4	
2017
7.	(Czech Republic) Karolína Plíšková	3	Dubai Championships, UAE	Hard	2R	6–2, 6–4	
8.	(Romania) Simona Halep	4	Indian Wells Open, U.S.	Hard	3R	6–3, 6–3	
9.	(Germany) Angelique Kerber	2	Stuttgart Open, Germany	Clay	2R	6–2, 7–5	
10.	(Russia) Svetlana Kuznetsova	9	Madrid Open, Spain	Clay	SF	6–4, 7–6^{(7–4)}	
11.	(Spain) Garbiñe Muguruza	5	French Open, France	Clay	4R	6–1, 3–6, 6–3	
2018
12.	(Germany) Julia Görges	10	Cincinnati Open, U.S.	Hard	1R	6–4, 3–2 ret.	
2019
13.	(Japan) Naomi Osaka	1	Dubai Championships, UAE	Hard	2R	6–3, 6–3	
14.	(Australia) Ashleigh Barty	9	Italian Open, Italy	Clay	3R	6–2, 6–3	
15.	(Ukraine) Elina Svitolina	3	Zhengzhou Open, China	Hard	QF	6–4, 4–6, 6–3	
16.	(Netherlands) Kiki Bertens	8	Kremlin Cup, Russia	Hard (i)	QF	6–4, 2–6, 6–1	
17.	(Australia) Ashleigh Barty	1	Fed Cup, Australia	Hard	F	2–6, 6–4, 7–6^{(7–1)}	

== Longest losing streaks ==
=== 15-match losing streak (2017–18) ===
#	Tournament	Category	Start date	Surface	Rd	Opponent	Rank	Score
–	Citi Open	International	31 July 2017	Hard	1R	(Germany) Tatjana Maria	No. 62	7–5, 3–6, 6–3
1	Citi Open	International	31 July 2017	Hard	2R	(Canada) Bianca Andreescu (WC)	No. 67	2–6, 3–6
2	Rogers Cup	Premier 5	7 August 2017	Hard	1R	(Czech Republic) Barbora Strýcová	No. 26	2–6, 3–6
3	Western & Southern Open	Premier 5	14 August 2017	Hard	1R	(Australia) Daria Gavrilova	No. 26	0–6, 6–7^{(6–8)}
4	Connecticut Open	Premier	20 August 2017	Hard	1R	(Hungary) Tímea Babos	No. 66	5–7, 5–7
5	US Open	Grand Slam	28 August 2017	Hard	1R	(Romania) Monica Niculescu	No. 57	3–6, 2–6
6	Japan Women's Open	International	11 September 2017	Hard	1R	(Croatia) Jana Fett (Q)	No. 123	4–6, 3–6
7	Pan Pacific Open	Premier	18 September 2017	Hard	1R	(China) Wang Qiang	No. 57	0–6, 0–6
8	Wuhan Open	Premier 5	24 September 2017	Hard	1R	(Czech Republic) Kateřina Siniaková	No. 47	3–6, 2–6
9	China Open	Premier Mandatory	30 September 2017	Hard	1R	(China) Duan Yingying (WC)	No. 99	5–7, 4–6
10	Kremlin Cup	Premier	16 October 2017	Hard (i)	2R	(Belarus) Aliaksandra Sasnovich	No. 100	2–6, 6–2, 2–6
11	WTA Elite Trophy	WTA Elite Trophy	31 October 2017	Hard (i)	RR	(Germany) Julia Görges (7)	No. 18	2–6, 6–7^{(4–7)}
12	WTA Elite Trophy	WTA Elite Trophy	31 October 2017	Hard (i)	RR	(Slovakia) Magdaléna Rybáriková (10)	No. 22	5–7, 6–1, 6–7^{(5–7)}
13	Brisbane International	Premier	31 December 2018	Hard	1R	(Belarus) Aliaksandra Sasnovich (Q)	No. 88	6–1, 3–6, 5–7
14	Sydney International	Premier	7 January 2018	Hard	1R	(Australia) Ellen Perez (WC)	No. 341	4–6, 2–4, ret.
15	Australian Open	Grand Slam	15 January 2018	Hard	1R	(Romania) Ana Bogdan	No. 104	3–6, 2–6
–	St. Petersburg Trophy	Premier	29 January 2018	Hard (i)	2R	(Slovakia) Dominika Cibulková	No. 26	6–4, 6–4
