= 2014 WTA Premier Mandatory and Premier 5 tournaments =

Women's professional tennis tour

2014 Premier Mandatory / Premier 5
Details
- Duration: February 10 – October 5
- Edition: 25th
- Tournaments: 9

Achievements (singles)
- Most titles: (United States) Serena Williams (3)
- Most finals: (United States) Serena Williams (3)

The WTA Premier Mandatory and Premier 5 tournaments, which are part of the WTA Premier tournaments, make up the elite tour for professional women's tennis organised by the WTA called the WTA Tour. There are four Premier Mandatory tournaments: Indian Wells, Miami, Madrid and Beijing and five Premier 5 tournaments: Doha, Rome, Canada, Cincinnati and Wuhan.

== Tournaments ==
Tournament	Country	Location	Surface	Date	Prize money
Qatar Total Open	Qatar	Doha	Hard	Feb 10 – 16	$2,369,000
BNP Paribas Open	United States	Indian Wells	Hard	Mar 3 – 16	$5,946,740
Sony Open Tennis	United States	Key Biscayne	Hard	Mar 17 – 30	$5,427,105
Mutua Madrid Open	Spain	Madrid	Clay (red)	May 5 – 11	$4,942,700
Internazionali BNL d'Italia	Italy	Rome	Clay (red)	May 12 – 18	$2,369,000
Rogers Cup	Canada	Montreal	Hard	Aug 4 – 10	$2,369,000
Western & Southern Open	United States	Mason	Hard	Aug 11 – 17	$2,369,000
Wuhan Open	China	Wuhan	Hard	Sep 22 – 28	$2,440,070
China Open	China	Beijing	Hard	Sep 29 – Oct 5	$5,427,105

== Results ==
* First-time champion

Tournament	Singles champions	Runners-up	Score	Doubles champions	Runners-up	Score
Doha Singles – Doubles	(Romania) Simona Halep*	(Germany) Angelique Kerber	6–2, 6–3	(Chinese Taipei) Hsieh Su-wei (China) Peng Shuai	(Czech Republic) Květa Peschke (Slovenia) Katarina Srebotnik	6–4, 6–0
Indian Wells Singles – Doubles	(Italy) Flavia Pennetta*	(Poland) Agnieszka Radwańska	6–2, 6–1	(Chinese Taipei) Hsieh Su-wei (2) (China) Peng Shuai (2)	(Zimbabwe) Cara Black (India) Sania Mirza	7–6^{(7–5)}, 6–2
Miami Singles – Doubles	(United States) Serena Williams	(China) Li Na	7–5, 6–1	(Switzerland) Martina Hingis	(Russia) Ekaterina Makarova (Russia) Elena Vesnina	4–6, 6–4, [10–5]
Miami Singles – Doubles	(United States) Serena Williams	(China) Li Na	7–5, 6–1	(Germany) Sabine Lisicki*	(Russia) Ekaterina Makarova (Russia) Elena Vesnina	4–6, 6–4, [10–5]
Madrid Singles – Doubles	(Russia) Maria Sharapova	(Romania) Simona Halep	1–6, 6–2, 6–3	(Italy) Sara Errani (Italy) Roberta Vinci	(Spain) Garbine Muguruza (Spain) Carla Suárez Navarro	6–4, 6–4
Rome Singles – Doubles	(United States) Serena Williams (2)	(Italy) Sara Errani	6–3, 6–0	(Czech Republic) Květa Peschke (Slovenia) Katarina Srebotnik	(Italy) Sara Errani (Italy) Roberta Vinci	4–0, ret.
Montréal Singles – Doubles	(Poland) Agnieszka Radwańska	(United States) Venus Williams	6–4, 6–2	(Italy) Sara Errani (2) (Italy) Roberta Vinci (2)	(Zimbabwe) Cara Black (India) Sania Mirza	7–6^{(7–4)}, 6–3
Cincinnati Singles – Doubles	(United States) Serena Williams (3)	(Serbia) Ana Ivanovic	6–4, 6–1	(United States) Raquel Kops-Jones (United States) Abigail Spears	(Hungary) Tímea Babos (France) Kristina Mladenovic	6–1, 2–0, ret.
Wuhan Singles – Doubles	(Czech Republic) Petra Kvitová	(Canada) Eugenie Bouchard	6–3, 6–4	(Switzerland) Martina Hingis (2) (Italy) Flavia Pennetta	(Zimbabwe) Cara Black (France) Caroline Garcia	6–4, 5–7, [12–10]
Beijing Singles – Doubles	(Russia) Maria Sharapova (2)	(Czech Republic) Petra Kvitová	6–4, 2–6, 6–3	(Czech Republic) Andrea Hlaváčková (China) Peng Shuai (3)	(Zimbabwe) Cara Black (India) Sania Mirza	6–4, 6–4

== See also ==
- WTA Premier tournaments
- 2014 WTA Tour
- 2014 ATP Masters 1000
- 2014 ATP Tour
