= 2014 ATP World Tour Masters 1000 =

Men's professional tennis tour

2014 ATP Masters 1000
Details
- Duration: March 6 – November 2
- Edition: 25th
- Tournaments: 9

Achievements (singles)
- Most titles: (Serbia) Novak Djokovic (4)
- Most finals: (Switzerland) Roger Federer (5)

The twenty-fifth edition of the ATP Masters Series. The champion of each Masters event is awarded 1,000 rankings points.

== Tournaments ==
Tournament	Country	Location	Court surface	Prize money
Indian Wells Masters	USA	Indian Wells, California	Hard	$6,959,295
Miami Open	USA	Key Biscayne, Florida	Hard	$5,649,405
Monte-Carlo Masters	France	Roquebrune-Cap-Martin	Clay	€3,246,165
Madrid Open	Spain	Madrid	Clay	€4,625,835
Italian Open	Italy	Rome	Clay	€3,452,415
Canadian Open	Canada	Toronto	Hard	$3,766,270
Cincinnati Masters	USA	Mason, Ohio	Hard	$4,017,355
Shanghai Masters	China	Shanghai	Hard	$6,521,695
Paris Masters	France	Paris	Hard (indoor)	€3,452,415

== Results ==
* First-time champion
§ Career Golden Masters

Masters	Singles champions	Runners-up	Score	Doubles champions	Runners-up	Score
Indian Wells Singles – Doubles	(Serbia) Novak Djokovic	(Switzerland) Roger Federer	3–6, 6–3, 7–6^{(7–3)}	(United States) Bob Bryan (United States) Mike Bryan	(Austria) Alexander Peya (Brazil) Bruno Soares	6–4, 6–3
Miami Singles – Doubles	(Serbia) Novak Djokovic	(Spain) Rafael Nadal	6–3, 6–3	(United States) Bob Bryan (United States) Mike Bryan	(Colombia) Juan Sebastián Cabal (Colombia) Robert Farah	7–6^{(10–8)}, 6–4
Monte Carlo Singles – Doubles	(Switzerland) Stan Wawrinka*	(Switzerland) Roger Federer	4–6, 7–6^{(7–5)}, 6–2	(United States) Bob Bryan (United States) Mike Bryan	(Croatia) Ivan Dodig (Brazil) Marcelo Melo	6–3, 3–6, [10–8]
Madrid Singles – Doubles	(Spain) Rafael Nadal	(Japan) Kei Nishikori	2–6, 6–4, 3–0 ret.	(Canada) Daniel Nestor (Serbia) Nenad Zimonjić	(United States) Bob Bryan (United States) Mike Bryan	6–4, 6–2
Rome Singles – Doubles	(Serbia) Novak Djokovic	(Spain) Rafael Nadal	4–6, 6–3, 6–3	(Canada) Daniel Nestor (Serbia) Nenad Zimonjić	(Netherlands) Robin Haase (Spain) Feliciano López	6–4, 7–6^{(7–2)}
Toronto Singles – Doubles	(France) Jo-Wilfried Tsonga	(Switzerland) Roger Federer	7–5, 7–6^{(7–3)}	(Austria) Alexander Peya (Brazil) Bruno Soares	(Croatia) Ivan Dodig (Brazil) Marcelo Melo	6–4, 6–3
Cincinnati Singles – Doubles	(Switzerland) Roger Federer	(Spain) David Ferrer	6–3, 1–6, 6–2	(United States) Bob Bryan (United States) Mike Bryan	(Canada) Vasek Pospisil (United States) Jack Sock	6–3, 6–2
Shanghai Singles – Doubles	(Switzerland) Roger Federer	(France) Gilles Simon	7–6^{(8–6)}, 7–6^{(7–2)}	(United States) Bob Bryan^{§} (United States) Mike Bryan^{§}	(France) Julien Benneteau (France) Edouard Roger-Vasselin	6–3, 7–6^{(7–3)}
Paris Singles – Doubles	(Serbia) Novak Djokovic	(Canada) Milos Raonic	6–2, 6–3	(United States) Bob Bryan (United States) Mike Bryan	(Poland) Marcin Matkowski (Austria) Jürgen Melzer	7–6^{(7–5)}, 5–7, [10–6]

== Tournament details ==
Key

- Q = Qualifier
- WC = Wild card
- LL = Lucky loser
- Alt = Alternate
- ITF = ITF entry
- PR = Protected ranking
- SR = Special ranking
- SE = Special exempt
- JE = Junior exempt
- JR = Junior Accelerator Programme entrant
- CO = College Accelerator Programme entrant
- NG = Next Gen Accelerator Program entrant
- w/o = Walkover
- r = Retired
- d = Defaulted

=== Indian Wells Masters ===
==== Singles ====
Quarterfinals
28	(Ukraine) Alexandr Dolgopolov	6	6
10	(Canada) Milos Raonic	3	4
17	(South Africa) Kevin Anderson	5	1
7	(Switzerland) Roger Federer	7	6
12	(United States) John Isner	7^{7}	7^{7}
20	(Latvia) Ernests Gulbis	6^{4}	6^{3}
(France) Julien Benneteau	1	3
2	(Serbia) Novak Djokovic	6	6

Semifinals
28	(Ukraine) Alexandr Dolgopolov	3	1
7	(Switzerland) Roger Federer	6	6
12	(United States) John Isner	5	7^{7}	1
2	(Serbia) Novak Djokovic	7	6^{2}	6

Final
7	(Switzerland) Roger Federer	6	3	6^{3}
2	(Serbia) Novak Djokovic	3	6	7^{7}

==== Doubles ====
Semifinals
1	(United States) Bob Bryan (United States) Mike Bryan	6^{4}	6	[10]
(United States) John Isner (United States) Sam Querrey	7^{7}	1	[7]
(Switzerland) Roger Federer (Switzerland) Stanislas Wawrinka	4	1
2	(Austria) Alexander Peya (Brazil) Bruno Soares	6	6

Final
1	(United States) Bob Bryan (United States) Mike Bryan	6	6
2	(Austria) Alexander Peya (Brazil) Bruno Soares	4	3

=== Miami Open ===
==== Singles ====
Quarterfinals
1	(Spain) Rafael Nadal	4	6	6
12	(Canada) Milos Raonic	6	2	4
22	(Ukraine) Alexandr Dolgopolov	4	6^{3}
7	(Czech Republic) Tomáš Berdych	6	7^{7}
5	(Switzerland) Roger Federer	6	5	4
20	(Japan) Kei Nishikori	3	7	6
6	(United Kingdom) Andy Murray	5	3
2	(Serbia) Novak Djokovic	7	6

Semifinals
1	(Spain) Rafael Nadal	w/o
7	(Czech Republic) Tomáš Berdych
20	(Japan) Kei Nishikori
2	(Serbia) Novak Djokovic	w/o

Final
1	(Spain) Rafael Nadal	3	3
2	(Serbia) Novak Djokovic	6	6

==== Doubles ====
Semifinals
1	(United States) Bob Bryan (United States) Mike Bryan	7^{7}	6
8	(France) Michaël Llodra (France) Nicolas Mahut	6^{2}	2
WC	(United States) Ryan Harrison (United States) Jack Sock	6	4	[9]
(Colombia) Juan Sebastián Cabal (Colombia) Robert Farah	2	6	[11]

Final
1	(United States) Bob Bryan (United States) Mike Bryan	7^{10}	6
(Colombia) Juan Sebastián Cabal (Colombia) Robert Farah	6^{8}	4

=== Monte-Carlo Masters ===
==== Singles ====
Quarterfinals
1	(Spain) Rafael Nadal	6^{1}	4
6	(Spain) David Ferrer	7^{7}	6
3	(Switzerland) Stanislas Wawrinka	7^{7}	6
8	(Canada) Milos Raonic	6^{5}	2
9	(France) Jo-Wilfried Tsonga	6	6^{6}	1
4/WC	(Switzerland) Roger Federer	2	7^{8}	6
(Spain) Guillermo García-López	6	3	1
2	(Serbia) Novak Djokovic	4	6	6

Semifinals
6	(Spain) David Ferrer	1	6^{3}
3	(Switzerland) Stanislas Wawrinka	6	7^{7}
4/WC	(Switzerland) Roger Federer	7	6
2	(Serbia) Novak Djokovic	5	2

Final
3	(Switzerland) Stanislas Wawrinka	4	7^{7}	6
4/WC	(Switzerland) Roger Federer	6	6^{5}	2

==== Doubles ====
Semifinals
1	(United States) Bob Bryan (United States) Mike Bryan	7^{7}	6
5	(Canada) Daniel Nestor (Serbia) Nenad Zimonjić	6^{5}	3
3	(Croatia) Ivan Dodig (Brazil) Marcelo Melo	6	1	[10]
(Belarus) Max Mirnyi (Russia) Mikhail Youzhny	3	6	[6]

Final
1	(United States) Bob Bryan (United States) Mike Bryan	6	3	[10]
3	(Croatia) Ivan Dodig (Brazil) Marcelo Melo	3	6	[8]

=== Madrid Open ===
==== Singles ====
Quarterfinals
1	(Spain) Rafael Nadal	6	6
6	(Czech Republic) Tomáš Berdych	4	2
(Spain) Roberto Bautista-Agut	6	6
Q	(Colombia) Santiago Giraldo	3	4
10	(Japan) Kei Nishikori	6	6
(Spain) Feliciano López	4	4
5	(Spain) David Ferrer	7^{7}	6
(Latvia) Ernests Gulbis	6^{3}	3

Semifinals
1	(Spain) Rafael Nadal	6	6
(Spain) Roberto Bautista-Agut	4	3
10	(Japan) Kei Nishikori	7^{7}	5	6
5	(Spain) David Ferrer	6^{5}	7	3

Final
1	(Spain) Rafael Nadal	2	6	3
10	(Japan) Kei Nishikori	6	4	0r

==== Doubles ====
Semifinals
1	(United States) Bob Bryan (United States) Mike Bryan	7^{7}	7
4	(Spain) David Marrero (Spain) Fernando Verdasco	6^{3}	5
(Colombia) Juan Sebastián Cabal (Colombia) Robert Farah	5	4
6	(Canada) Daniel Nestor (Serbia) Nenad Zimonjić	7	6

Final
1	(United States) Bob Bryan (United States) Mike Bryan	4	2
6	(Canada) Daniel Nestor (Serbia) Nenad Zimonjić	6	6

=== Italian Open ===
==== Singles ====
Quarterfinals
1	(Spain) Rafael Nadal	1	6	7
7	(United Kingdom) Andy Murray	6	3	5
15	(Germany) Tommy Haas	2	0^{r}
12	(Bulgaria) Grigor Dimitrov	6	0
8	(Canada) Milos Raonic	6	5	6
(France) Jérémy Chardy	3	7	2
5	(Spain) David Ferrer	5	6	3
2	(Serbia) Novak Djokovic	7	4	6

Semifinals
1	(Spain) Rafael Nadal	6	6
12	(Bulgaria) Grigor Dimitrov	2	2
8	(Canada) Milos Raonic	7^{7}	6^{4}	3
2	(Serbia) Novak Djokovic	6^{5}	7^{7}	6

Final
1	(Spain) Rafael Nadal	6	3	3
2	(Serbia) Novak Djokovic	4	6	6

==== Doubles ====
Semifinals
1	(United States) Bob Bryan (United States) Mike Bryan	6^{3}	6	[10]
6	(Canada) Daniel Nestor (Serbia) Nenad Zimonjić	7^{7}	4	[12]
(Netherlands) Robin Haase (Spain) Feliciano López	6	6
(Bulgaria) Grigor Dimitrov (Czech Republic) Lukáš Rosol	2	4

Final
6	(Canada) Daniel Nestor (Serbia) Nenad Zimonjić	6	7^{7}
(Netherlands) Robin Haase (Spain) Feliciano López	4	6^{2}

=== Canadian Open ===
==== Singles ====
Quarterfinals
13	(France) Jo-Wilfried Tsonga	7^{7}	4	6
8	(United Kingdom) Andy Murray	6^{5}	6	4
(South Africa) Kevin Anderson	7	5	6^{6}
7	(Bulgaria) Grigor Dimitrov	5	7	7^{8}
6	(Canada) Milos Raonic	4	7^{7}	3
(Spain) Feliciano López	6	6^{5}	6
5	(Spain) David Ferrer	3	6	3
2	(Switzerland) Roger Federer	6	4	6

Semifinals
13	(France) Jo-Wilfried Tsonga	6	6
7	(Bulgaria) Grigor Dimitrov	4	3
(Spain) Feliciano López	3	4
2	(Switzerland) Roger Federer	6	6

Final
13	(France) Jo-Wilfried Tsonga	7	7^{7}
2	(Switzerland) Roger Federer	5	6^{3}

==== Doubles ====
Semifinals
(Croatia) Marin Čilić (Mexico) Santiago González	3	2
4	(Croatia) Ivan Dodig (Brazil) Marcelo Melo	6	6
3	(Canada) Daniel Nestor (Serbia) Nenad Zimonjić	4	6^{8}
2	(Austria) Alexander Peya (Brazil) Bruno Soares	6	7^{10}

Final
4	(Croatia) Ivan Dodig (Brazil) Marcelo Melo	4	3
2	(Austria) Alexander Peya (Brazil) Bruno Soares	6	6

=== Cincinnati Masters ===
==== Singles ====
Quarterfinals
16	(Spain) Tommy Robredo	4	6	3
6	(Spain) David Ferrer	6	3	6
3	(Switzerland) Stan Wawrinka	6	1	2
(France) Julien Benneteau	1	6	6
5	(Canada) Milos Raonic	6	6
15	(Italy) Fabio Fognini	1	0
8	(United Kingdom) Andy Murray	3	5
2	(Switzerland) Roger Federer	6	7

Semifinals
6	(Spain) David Ferrer	6	6
(France) Julien Benneteau	3	2
5	(Canada) Milos Raonic	2	3
2	(Switzerland) Roger Federer	6	6

Final
6	(Spain) David Ferrer	3	6	2
2	(Switzerland) Roger Federer	6	1	6

==== Doubles ====
Semifinals
1	(United States) Bob Bryan (United States) Mike Bryan	6	6^{5}	[10]
WC	(United States) Steve Johnson (United States) Sam Querrey	3	7^{7}	[8]
6	(France) Julien Benneteau (France) Édouard Roger-Vasselin	6^{5}	6	[6]
(Canada) Vasek Pospisil (United States) Jack Sock	7^{7}	3	[10]

Final
1	(United States) Bob Bryan (United States) Mike Bryan	6	6
(Canada) Vasek Pospisil (United States) Jack Sock	3	2

=== Shanghai Masters ===
==== Singles ====
Quarterfinals
1	(Serbia) Novak Djokovic	6	6
5	(Spain) David Ferrer	4	2
3	(Switzerland) Roger Federer	7^{7}	6
(France) Julien Benneteau	6^{4}	0
6	(Czech Republic) Tomáš Berdych	6^{4}	6	0
(France) Gilles Simon	7^{7}	4	6
(Russia) Mikhail Youzhny	7	4	4
(Spain) Feliciano López	5	6	6

Semifinals
1	(Serbia) Novak Djokovic	4	4
3	(Switzerland) Roger Federer	6	6
(France) Gilles Simon	6	7^{7}
(Spain) Feliciano López	2	6^{1}

Final
3	(Switzerland) Roger Federer	7^{8}	7^{7}
(France) Gilles Simon	6^{6}	6^{2}

==== Doubles ====
Semifinals
1	(United States) Bob Bryan (United States) Mike Bryan	7^{7}	6
(India) Rohan Bopanna (Romania) Florin Mergea	6^{5}	4
5	(France) Julien Benneteau (France) Édouard Roger-Vasselin	3	6	[10]
6	(Spain) Marcel Granollers (Spain) Marc López	6	4	[7]

Final
1	(United States) Bob Bryan (United States) Mike Bryan	6	7^{7}
5	(France) Julien Benneteau (France) Édouard Roger-Vasselin	3	6^{3}

=== Paris Masters ===
==== Singles ====
Quarterfinals
1	(Serbia) Novak Djokovic	7	6
8	(United Kingdom) Andy Murray	5	2
4	(Spain) David Ferrer	6	6^{5}	4
6	(Japan) Kei Nishikori	3	7^{7}	6
5	(Czech Republic) Tomáš Berdych	6^{4}	6	6
14	(South Africa) Kevin Anderson	7^{7}	4	4
7	(Canada) Milos Raonic	7^{7}	7
2	(Switzerland) Roger Federer	6^{5}	5

Semifinals
1	(Serbia) Novak Djokovic	6	6
6	(Japan) Kei Nishikori	2	3
5	(Czech Republic) Tomáš Berdych	3	6	5
7	(Canada) Milos Raonic	6	3	7

Final
1	(Serbia) Novak Djokovic	6	6
7	(Canada) Milos Raonic	2	3

==== Doubles ====
Semifinals
1	(United States) Bob Bryan (United States) Mike Bryan	6	6
8	(Netherlands) Jean-Julien Rojer (Romania) Horia Tecău	3	3
PR	(Poland) Marcin Matkowski (Austria) Jürgen Melzer	6	6
5	(Spain) Marcel Granollers (Spain) Marc López	2	3

Final
1	(United States) Bob Bryan (United States) Mike Bryan	7^{7}	5	[10]
PR	(Poland) Marcin Matkowski (Austria) Jürgen Melzer	6^{5}	7	[6]

== See also ==
- ATP Tour Masters 1000
- 2014 ATP Tour
- 2014 WTA Premier Mandatory and Premier 5 tournaments
- 2014 WTA Tour
