= 2022 Open Feu Aziz Zouhir – Doubles =

Doubles
- 2022 Open Feu Aziz Zouhir

Final
- Champions: (Indonesia) Priska Madelyn Nugroho (China) Wei Sijia
- Runners-up: (Netherlands) Isabelle Haverlag (Netherlands) Suzan Lamens
- Score: 6–3, 6–2

Events
Singles	Doubles
Open Feu Aziz Zouhir	· 2023 →

This was the first edition of the tournament.

Priska Madelyn Nugroho and Wei Sijia won the title, defeating Isabelle Haverlag and Suzan Lamens in the final, 6–3, 6–2.

== Seeds ==
1. (France) Elixane Lechemia / (Germany) Julia Lohoff (semifinals)
2. (France) Estelle Cascino / (India) Prarthana Thombare (quarterfinals)
3. (United Kingdom) Emily Appleton / (Switzerland) Conny Perrin (quarterfinals)
4. (Poland) Weronika Falkowska / Ekaterina Makarova (semifinals)

== Draw ==
=== Key ===
- Q = Qualifier
- WC = Wild card
- LL = Lucky loser
- Alt = Alternate
- SE = Special exempt
- PR = Protected ranking
- ITF = ITF entry
- JE = Junior exempt
- w/o = Walkover
- r = Retired
- d = Defaulted
- SR = Special ranking

=== Draw ===
First round
1	(France) E Lechemia (Germany) J Lohoff	6	6
(Uzbekistan) N Abduraimova; E Yashina	1	3
(France) Y Mansouri (China) X Yao	6	6
WC	E Mamedova (Denmark) DD Nweke	2	3
3	(United Kingdom) E Appleton (Switzerland) C Perrin	6	7^{7}
WC	(France) C Roméo (France) M Villet	2	6^{3}
(Algeria) I Ibbou (Bulgaria) I Shinikova	4	7	[6]
(Netherlands) I Haverlag (Netherlands) S Lamens	6	5	[10]
WC	(Tunisia) F Ben Hassen (Germany) G Feistel	1	7^{7}	[10]
(India) J Luikham (Italy) MV Viviani	6	6^{4}	[4]
(Romania) O Gavrilă (Austria) S Kraus	3	3
4	(Poland) W Falkowska; E Makarova	6	6
(Indonesia) PM Nugroho (China) S Wei	6	6
(Czech Republic) D Hindová (Czech Republic) K Vlčková	1	4
(Slovakia) B Behúlová (Slovakia) R Zelníčková	2	2
2	(France) E Cascino (India) P Thombare	6	6

Quarterfinals
1	(France) E Lechemia (Germany) J Lohoff	6	7^{7}
(France) Y Mansouri (China) X Yao	4	6^{4}
3	(United Kingdom) E Appleton (Switzerland) C Perrin	3	1
(Netherlands) I Haverlag (Netherlands) S Lamens	6	6
WC	(Tunisia) F Ben Hassen (Germany) G Feistel	3	2
4	(Poland) W Falkowska; E Makarova	6	6
(Indonesia) PM Nugroho (China) S Wei	6	6
2	(France) E Cascino (India) P Thombare	3	3

Semifinals
1	(France) E Lechemia (Germany) J Lohoff	7^{7}	1	[7]
(Netherlands) I Haverlag (Netherlands) S Lamens	6^{5}	6	[10]
4	(Poland) W Falkowska; E Makarova	3	2
(Indonesia) PM Nugroho (China) S Wei	6	6

Final
(Netherlands) I Haverlag (Netherlands) S Lamens	3	2
(Indonesia) PM Nugroho (China) S Wei	6	6
