= 2022 Open Feu Aziz Zouhir =

Tennis tournament

- Date: 10–16 October 2022
- Edition: 1st
- Category: ITF Women's World Tennis Tour
- Prize money: $60,000
- Surface: Hard / Outdoor
- Location: Monastir, Tunisia

Champions

Singles
- (France) Kristina Mladenovic

Doubles
- (Indonesia) Priska Madelyn Nugroho / (China) Wei Sijia
Open Feu Aziz Zouhir	· 2023 →

The 2022 Open Feu Aziz Zouhir was a professional tennis tournament played on outdoor hard courts. It was the first edition of the tournament which was part of the 2022 ITF Women's World Tennis Tour. It took place in Monastir, Tunisia between 10 and 16 October 2022.

== Champions ==
=== Singles ===
- (France) Kristina Mladenovic def. (Slovenia) Tamara Zidanšek, 6–1, 3–6, 7–5

=== Doubles ===
- (Indonesia) Priska Madelyn Nugroho / (China) Wei Sijia def. (Netherlands) Isabelle Haverlag / (Netherlands) Suzan Lamens, 6–3, 6–2

== Singles main draw entrants ==
=== Seeds ===
Country	Player	Rank^{1}	Seed
~~CHN~~	~~Zhu Lin~~	~~64~~	~~1~~
SLO	Tamara Zidanšek	101	2
ITA	Sara Errani	108	3
JPN	Moyuka Uchijima	124	4
FRA	Kristina Mladenovic	134	5
GRE	Despina Papamichail	175	6
UZB	Nigina Abduraimova	187	7
NED	Suzan Lamens	190	8

- ^{1} Rankings are as of 3 October 2022.

=== Other entrants ===
The following players received wildcards into the singles main draw:

- (Tunisia) Chiraz Bechri
- (Tunisia) Feryel Ben Hassen
- Evgeniya Rodina
- (Slovenia) Tamara Zidanšek

The following players received entry from the qualifying draw:

- (Germany) Gina Feistel
- (Romania) Oana Gavrilă
- (Germany) Julia Lohoff
- Edda Mamedova
- (Indonesia) Priska Madelyn Nugroho
- (France) Caroline Roméo
- (France) Marie Villet
- (Slovakia) Radka Zelníčková

The following players received entry as a lucky loser:

- (Italy) Maria Vittoria Viviani
