= 2014 Western & Southern Open – Men's doubles =

Men's doubles
- 2014 Western & Southern Open

Final
- Champions: (United States) Bob Bryan (United States) Mike Bryan
- Runners-up: (Canada) Vasek Pospisil (United States) Jack Sock
- Score: 6–3, 6–2

Events
Singles	men	women
Doubles	men	women
← 2013 ·	Western & Southern Open	· 2015 →

Bob and Mike Bryan were the defending champions and successfully defended the title, defeating Vasek Pospisil and Jack Sock in the final, 6–3, 6–2.

== Seeds ==
1. (United States) Bob Bryan / (United States) Mike Bryan (champions)
2. (Austria) Alexander Peya / (Brazil) Bruno Soares (quarterfinals)
3. (Canada) Daniel Nestor / (Serbia) Nenad Zimonjić (quarterfinals)
4. (Croatia) Ivan Dodig / (Brazil) Marcelo Melo (second round)
5. (India) Leander Paes / (Czech Republic) Radek Štěpánek (second round)
6. (France) Julien Benneteau / (France) Édouard Roger-Vasselin (semifinals)
7. (Spain) Marcel Granollers / (Spain) Marc López (second round)
8. (Spain) David Marrero / (Spain) Fernando Verdasco (second round)

== Draw ==
=== Key ===
- Q = Qualifier
- WC = Wild card
- LL = Lucky loser
- Alt = Alternate
- SE = Special exempt
- PR = Protected ranking
- ITF = ITF entry
- JE = Junior exempt
- w/o = Walkover
- r = Retired
- d = Defaulted
- SR = Special ranking

=== Finals ===
Semifinals
1	(United States) Bob Bryan (United States) Mike Bryan	6	6^{5}	[10]
WC	(United States) Steve Johnson (United States) Sam Querrey	3	7^{7}	[8]
6	(France) Julien Benneteau (France) Édouard Roger-Vasselin	6^{5}	6	[6]
(Canada) Vasek Pospisil (United States) Jack Sock	7^{7}	3	[10]

Final
1	(United States) Bob Bryan (United States) Mike Bryan	6	6
(Canada) Vasek Pospisil (United States) Jack Sock	3	2

=== Top half ===
First round
PR	(Spain) F López (Austria) J Melzer	4	3
(United States) E Butorac (South Africa) R Klaasen	6	6
(Netherlands) J-J Rojer (Romania) H Tecău	7^{7}	7^{8}
(Belarus) M Mirnyi (Russia) M Youzhny	6^{3}	6^{6}
(Sweden) R Lindstedt (Poland) M Matkowski	5	6	[10]
Alt	(United Kingdom) J Murray (Australia) J Peers	7	3	[3]
WC	(United States) M McDonald (United States) T Smyczek	0	4
WC	(United States) S Johnson (United States) S Querrey	6	6

Second round
1	(United States) B Bryan (United States) M Bryan	6	6
(United States) E Butorac (South Africa) R Klaasen	1	4
(Netherlands) J-J Rojer (Romania) H Tecău	7	7^{7}
7	(Spain) M Granollers (Spain) M López	5	6^{5}
4	(Croatia) I Dodig (Brazil) M Melo	2	4
(Sweden) R Lindstedt (Poland) M Matkowski	6	6
WC	(United States) S Johnson (United States) S Querrey	7^{7}	6
8	(Spain) D Marrero (Spain) F Verdasco	6^{4}	4

Quarterfinals
1	(United States) B Bryan (United States) M Bryan	7^{7}	6^{6}	[10]
(Netherlands) J-J Rojer (Romania) H Tecău	6^{5}	7^{8}	[2]
(Sweden) R Lindstedt (Poland) M Matkowski	6^{7}	6	[2]
WC	(United States) S Johnson (United States) S Querrey	7^{9}	4	[10]

Semifinals
1	(United States) B Bryan (United States) M Bryan	6	6^{5}	[10]
WC	(United States) S Johnson (United States) S Querrey	3	7^{7}	[8]

=== Bottom half ===
First round
(Colombia) JS Cabal (Spain) T Robredo	5	6	[10]
(Germany) P Kohlschreiber (France) G Monfils	7	3	[3]
(Spain) G García-López (Colombia) S Giraldo	3	6	[10]
(Italy) F Fognini (Poland) M Fyrstenberg	6	4	[3]
(India) R Bopanna (Pakistan) A-u-H Qureshi	5	2
(Canada) V Pospisil (United States) J Sock	7	6
(Croatia) M Čilić (Mexico) S González	6	3	[10]
(Philippines) T Huey (United Kingdom) D Inglot	3	6	[5]

Second round
6	(France) J Benneteau (France) É Roger-Vasselin	1	6	[10]
(Colombia) JS Cabal (Spain) T Robredo	6	4	[7]
(Spain) G García-López (Colombia) S Giraldo	2	3
3	(Canada) D Nestor (Serbia) N Zimonjić	6	6
5	(India) L Paes (Czech Republic) R Štěpánek	1	6	[8]
(Canada) V Pospisil (United States) J Sock	6	4	[10]
(Croatia) M Čilić (Mexico) S González	6^{3}	6^{6}
2	(Austria) A Peya (Brazil) B Soares	7^{7}	7^{8}

Quarterfinals
6	(France) J Benneteau (France) É Roger-Vasselin	6	6
3	(Canada) D Nestor (Serbia) N Zimonjić	3	4
(Canada) V Pospisil (United States) J Sock	6	5	[10]
2	(Austria) A Peya (Brazil) B Soares	2	7	[7]

Semifinals
6	(France) J Benneteau (France) É Roger-Vasselin	6^{5}	6	[6]
(Canada) V Pospisil (United States) J Sock	7^{7}	3	[10]
