= Open Feu Aziz Zouhir =

- 2022 Open Feu Aziz Zouhir

ITF Women's Tour
- Event name: Open Feu Aziz Zouhir
- Location: Monastir, Tunisia
- Venue: Magic Hotel Monastir
- Category: ITF Women's World Tennis Tour
- Surface: Hard / Outdoor
- Draw: 32S/32Q/16D
- Prize money: $60,000

The Open Feu Aziz Zouhir is a tournament for professional female tennis players played on outdoor hard courts. The event is classified as a $60,000 ITF Women's World Tennis Tour tournament and is held in Monastir, Tunisia.

== Past finals ==
=== Singles ===
| Year | Champion | Runner-up | Score |
|---|---|---|---|
| 2022 | (France) Kristina Mladenovic | (Slovenia) Tamara Zidanšek | 6–1, 3–6, 7–5 |

=== Doubles ===
| Year | Champions | Runners-up | Score |
|---|---|---|---|
| 2022 | (Indonesia) Priska Madelyn Nugroho (China) Wei Sijia | (Netherlands) Isabelle Haverlag (Netherlands) Suzan Lamens | 6–3, 6–2 |
