= 2022 Open Feu Aziz Zouhir – Singles =

Singles
- 2022 Open Feu Aziz Zouhir

Final
- Champion: (France) Kristina Mladenovic
- Runner-up: (Slovenia) Tamara Zidanšek
- Score: 6–1, 3–6, 7–5

Events
Singles	Doubles
Open Feu Aziz Zouhir	· 2023 →

This was the first edition of the tournament.

Kristina Mladenovic won the title, defeating Tamara Zidanšek in the final, 6–1, 3–6, 7–5.

== Seeds ==
1. (China) Zhu Lin (withdrew)
2. (Slovenia) Tamara Zidanšek (final)
3. (Italy) Sara Errani (semifinals)
4. (Japan) Moyuka Uchijima (second round)
5. (France) Kristina Mladenovic (champion)
6. (Greece) Despina Papamichail (semifinals)
7. (Uzbekistan) Nigina Abduraimova (second round)
8. (Netherlands) Suzan Lamens (second round)

== Draw ==
=== Key ===
- Q = Qualifier
- WC = Wild card
- LL = Lucky loser
- Alt = Alternate
- SE = Special exempt
- PR = Protected ranking
- ITF = ITF entry
- JE = Junior exempt
- w/o = Walkover
- r = Retired
- d = Defaulted
- SR = Special ranking

=== Finals ===
Semifinals
5	(France) Kristina Mladenovic	6	6
6	(Greece) Despina Papamichail	2	4
3	(Italy) Sara Errani	6	5	4
2/WC	(Slovenia) Tamara Zidanšek	2	7	6

Final
5	(France) Kristina Mladenovic	6	3	7
2/WC	(Slovenia) Tamara Zidanšek	1	6	5

=== Top half ===
First round
LL	(Italy) MV Viviani	2	5
E Yashina	6	7
Q	(Romania) O Gavrilă	6	6
(Austria) S Kraus	3	4
Q	(Slovakia) R Zelníčková	6	7
(Slovakia) B Behúlová	3	5
WC	(Tunisia) F Ben Hassen	1	3
5	(France) K Mladenovic	6	6
4	(Japan) M Uchijima	6	6
WC	E Rodina	1	2
Y Hatouka	3	4
(Poland) W Falkowska	6	6
Q	(Germany) G Feistel	2	2
(Bulgaria) I Shinikova	6	6
(France) E Cascino	1	3
6	(Greece) D Papamichail	6	6

Second round
E Yashina	3	2
Q	(Romania) O Gavrilă	6	6
Q	(Slovakia) R Zelníčková	2	3
5	(France) K Mladenovic	6	6
4	(Japan) M Uchijima	5	3
(Poland) W Falkowska	7	6
(Bulgaria) I Shinikova	6	3	6^{3}
6	(Greece) D Papamichail	3	6	7^{7}

Quarterfinals
Q	(Romania) O Gavrilă	0	0
5	(France) K Mladenovic	6	6
(Poland) W Falkowska	3	6	2
6	(Greece) D Papamichail	6	1	6

Semifinals
5	(France) K Mladenovic	6	6
6	(Greece) D Papamichail	2	4

=== Bottom half ===
First round
8	(Netherlands) S Lamens	6	6
(Switzerland) C Perrin	2	4
Q	E Mamedova	2	1
Q	(Indonesia) PM Nugroho	6	6
E Makarova	4	6	7
Q	(France) M Villet	6	3	5
(Algeria) I Ibbou	5	0
3	(Italy) S Errani	7	6
7	(Uzbekistan) N Abduraimova	6	6
WC	(Tunisia) C Bechri	1	3
Q	(France) C Roméo	3	1
(China) S Wei	6	6
(France) Y Mansouri	6	6
Q	(Germany) J Lohoff	4	4
(China) X Yao	3	6	4
2/WC	(Slovenia) T Zidanšek	6	4	6

Second round
8	(Netherlands) S Lamens	4	3
Q	(Indonesia) PM Nugroho	6	6
E Makarova	6	4	2
3	(Italy) S Errani	1	6	6
7	(Uzbekistan) N Abduraimova	0	6	3
(China) S Wei	6	2	6
(France) Y Mansouri	0	2
2/WC	(Slovenia) T Zidanšek	6	6

Quarterfinals
Q	(Indonesia) PM Nugroho	2	4
3	(Italy) S Errani	6	6
(China) S Wei	2	2
2/WC	(Slovenia) T Zidanšek	6	6

Semifinals
3	(Italy) S Errani	6	5	4
2/WC	(Slovenia) T Zidanšek	2	7	6
