= 2014 Western & Southern Open – Men's singles =

Tennis tournament in 2014

Men's singles
- 2014 Western & Southern Open

Final
- Champion: (Switzerland) Roger Federer
- Runner-up: (Spain) David Ferrer
- Score: 6–3, 1–6, 6–2

Events
Singles	men	women
Doubles	men	women
← 2013 ·	Western & Southern Open	· 2015 →

Roger Federer defeated David Ferrer in the final, 6–3, 1–6, 6–2 to win the men's singles tennis title at the 2014 Cincinnati Masters. It was his sixth Cincinnati Masters title.

Rafael Nadal was the reigning champion, but withdrew due to a right wrist injury.

== Seeds ==
The top eight seeds receive a bye into the second round.

1. (Serbia) Novak Djokovic (third round)
2. (Switzerland) Roger Federer (champion)
3. (Switzerland) Stan Wawrinka (quarterfinals)
4. (Czech Republic) Tomáš Berdych (second round)
5. (Canada) Milos Raonic (semifinals)
6. (Spain) David Ferrer (final)
7. (Bulgaria) Grigor Dimitrov (second round)
8. (United Kingdom) Andy Murray (quarterfinals)
9. (Latvia) Ernests Gulbis (second round)
10. (France) ~~Richard Gasquet~~ (withdrew due to abdominal injury)
11. (United States) John Isner (third round)
12. (France) Jo-Wilfried Tsonga (first round)
13. (Spain) Roberto Bautista Agut (second round)
14. (Croatia) Marin Čilić (third round)
15. (Italy) Fabio Fognini (quarterfinals)
16. (Spain) Tommy Robredo (quarterfinals)

Click on the seed number of a player to go to their draw section.

== Draw ==
Key

- Q = Qualifier
- WC = Wild card
- LL = Lucky loser
- Alt = Alternate
- ITF = ITF entry
- PR = Protected ranking
- SR = Special ranking
- SE = Special exempt
- JE = Junior exempt
- JR = Junior Accelerator Programme entrant
- CO = College Accelerator Programme entrant
- NG = Next Gen Accelerator Program entrant
- w/o = Walkover
- r = Retired
- d = Defaulted

=== Finals ===
Quarterfinals
16	(Spain) Tommy Robredo	4	6	3
6	(Spain) David Ferrer	6	3	6
3	(Switzerland) Stan Wawrinka	6	1	2
(France) Julien Benneteau	1	6	6
5	(Canada) Milos Raonic	6	6
15	(Italy) Fabio Fognini	1	0
8	(United Kingdom) Andy Murray	3	5
2	(Switzerland) Roger Federer	6	7

Semifinals
6	(Spain) David Ferrer	6	6
(France) Julien Benneteau	3	2
5	(Canada) Milos Raonic	2	3
2	(Switzerland) Roger Federer	6	6

Final
6	(Spain) David Ferrer	3	6	2
2	(Switzerland) Roger Federer	6	1	6

=== Top half ===
==== Section 1 ====
First round
(France) G Simon	6	6
Q	(Australia) B Tomic	3	2
(Colombia) A Falla	3	1
WC	(United States) S Querrey	6	6
WC	(United States) J Sock	6^{5}	3
16	(Spain) T Robredo	7^{7}	6
12	(France) J-W Tsonga	1	4
(Russia) M Youzhny	6	6
(Colombia) S Giraldo	6	2	5
(Italy) A Seppi	4	6	7
(France) J Chardy	3	6	4
(Germany) P Kohlschreiber	6	4	6

Second round
1	(Serbia) N Djokovic	6	4	6
(France) G Simon	3	6	4
WC	(United States) S Querrey	2	4
16	(Spain) T Robredo	6	6
(Russia) M Youzhny	6	6
(Italy) A Seppi	3	4
(Germany) P Kohlschreiber	7^{7}	6^{4}	6^{4}
6	(Spain) D Ferrer	6^{4}	7^{7}	7^{7}

Third round
1	(Serbia) N Djokovic	6^{6}	5
16	(Spain) T Robredo	7^{8}	7
(Russia) M Youzhny	5	0
6	(Spain) D Ferrer	7	6

Quarterfinals
16	(Spain) T Robredo	4	6	3
6	(Spain) D Ferrer	6	3	6

==== Section 2 ====
First round
Q	(Germany) B Becker	7^{7}	6
(Croatia) I Karlović	6^{5}	4
(Spain) M Granollers	7	3	6^{5}
(Spain) F Verdasco	5	6	7^{7}
(Spain) F López	3	4
14	(Croatia) M Čilić	6	6
LL	(Slovenia) B Rola	7^{9}	3	6^{7}
(France) J Benneteau	6^{7}	6	7^{9}
(Spain) G García López	2	6	1
Q	(United Kingdom) J Ward	6	3	6
(Poland) J Janowicz	6	6
Q	(Russia) T Gabashvili	4	4

Second round
3	(Switzerland) S Wawrinka	6	7^{7}
Q	(Germany) B Becker	3	6^{5}
(Spain) F Verdasco	6^{6}	6^{5}
14	(Croatia) M Čilić	7^{8}	7^{7}
(France) J Benneteau	6	6
Q	(United Kingdom) J Ward	2	2
(Poland) J Janowicz	6	3	6
7	(Bulgaria) G Dimitrov	4	6	3

Third round
3	(Switzerland) S Wawrinka	3	6	6
14	(Croatia) M Čilić	6	0	1
(France) J Benneteau	7	6
(Poland) J Janowicz	5	1

Quarterfinals
3	(Switzerland) S Wawrinka	6	1	2
(France) J Benneteau	1	6	6

=== Bottom half ===
==== Section 3 ====
First round
WC	(United States) R Ginepri	6	5	7
(Austria) D Thiem	3	7	5
WC	(United States) S Johnson	6	6
Q	(France) B Paire	4	1
(Croatia) I Dodig	6^{8}	6^{4}
9	(Latvia) E Gulbis	7^{10}	7^{7}
15	(Italy) F Fognini	6	4	7^{7}
(France) É Roger-Vasselin	4	6	6^{5}
(Australia) L Hewitt	3	6	6
PR	(Austria) J Melzer	6	4	4
(Chinese Taipei) Y-h Lu	6	6
(Uzbekistan) D Istomin	3	4

Second round
5	(Canada) M Raonic	6	6
WC	(United States) R Ginepri	2	2
WC	(United States) S Johnson	6	6
9	(Latvia) E Gulbis	4	4
15	(Italy) F Fognini	6	6
(Australia) L Hewitt	1	4
(Chinese Taipei) Y-h Lu	3	6	6
4	(Czech Republic) T Berdych	6	3	4

Third round
5	(Canada) M Raonic	6^{7}	6	7^{7}
WC	(United States) S Johnson	7^{9}	3	6^{4}
15	(Italy) F Fognini	3	6	6
(Chinese Taipei) Y-h Lu	6	3	3

Quarterfinals
5	(Canada) M Raonic	6	6
15	(Italy) F Fognini	1	0

==== Section 4 ====
First round
Q	(United States) C Buchanan	7	6^{3}	6^{5}
(Portugal) J Sousa	5	7^{7}	7^{7}
Q	(Australia) M Matosevic	6	7^{7}
(France) N Mahut	4	6^{4}
(South Africa) K Anderson	3	4
11	(United States) J Isner	6	6
13	(Spain) R Bautista Agut	6	4	7
(Slovakia) M Kližan	2	6	5
(Argentina) F Delbonis	3	6	3
(France) G Monfils	6	3	6
(Canada) V Pospisil	5	6	7^{7}
(Czech Republic) R Štěpánek	7	1	6^{4}

Second round
8	(United Kingdom) A Murray	6	6
(Portugal) J Sousa	3	3
Q	(Australia) M Matosevic	3	6^{1}
11	(United States) J Isner	6	7^{7}
13	(Spain) R Bautista Agut	4	1
(France) G Monfils	6	6
(Canada) V Pospisil	6^{4}	7	2
2	(Switzerland) R Federer	7^{7}	5	6

Third round
8	(United Kingdom) A Murray	6^{3}	6	7^{7}
11	(United States) J Isner	7^{7}	4	6^{2}
(France) G Monfils	4	6	3
2	(Switzerland) R Federer	6	4	6

Quarterfinals
8	(United Kingdom) A Murray	3	5
2	(Switzerland) R Federer	6	7

== Qualifying ==
=== Seeds ===
1. (Germany) Benjamin Becker (qualified)
2. (Australia) Marinko Matosevic (qualified)
3. (Russia) Teymuraz Gabashvili (qualified)
4. (Australia) Nick Kyrgios (withdrew due to left forearm injury)
5. (Australia) Bernard Tomic (qualified)
6. (Germany) Tobias Kamke (first round)
7. (Slovenia) Blaž Rola (qualifying competition, Lucky loser)
8. (France) Adrian Mannarino (qualifying competition)
9. (France) Paul-Henri Mathieu (qualifying competition)
10. (Australia) Matthew Ebden (qualifying competition)
11. (France) 'Benoît Paire (qualified)
12. (Colombia) Alejandro González (qualifying competition)
13. (Tunisia) Malek Jaziri (qualifying competition)
14. (United States) Tim Smyczek (qualifying competition)

=== Qualifiers ===
1. (Germany) Benjamin Becker
2. (Australia) Marinko Matosevic
3. (Russia) Teymuraz Gabashvili
4. (United States) Chase Buchanan
5. (Australia) Bernard Tomic
6. (United Kingdom) James Ward
7. (France) Benoît Paire

=== Lucky loser ===
1. (Slovenia) Blaž Rola

=== Qualifying draw ===
==== First qualifier ====
First round
1	(Germany) Benjamin Becker	7	6
(Japan) Tatsuma Ito	5	1
(United States) Michael Russell	4	6	6^{4}
13	(Tunisia) Malek Jaziri	6	2	7^{7}

Qualifying competition
1	(Germany) Benjamin Becker	6	3	7^{7}
13	(Tunisia) Malek Jaziri	4	6	6^{5}

==== Second qualifier ====
First round
2	(Australia) Marinko Matosevic	6	5	6
(Croatia) Ante Pavić	4	7	4
WC	(United States) Marcos Giron	3	5
8	(France) Adrian Mannarino	6	7

Qualifying competition
2	(Australia) Marinko Matosevic	6	6
8	(France) Adrian Mannarino	4	4

==== Third qualifier ====
First round
3	(Russia) Teymuraz Gabashvili	5	6	1
(Chinese Taipei) Jimmy Wang	7	4	0^{r}
(Canada) Peter Polansky	6^{1}	1
12	(Colombia) Alejandro González	7^{7}	6

Qualifying competition
3	(Russia) Teymuraz Gabashvili	6	4	6
12	(Colombia) Alejandro González	3	6	4

==== Fourth qualifier ====
First round
Alt	(France) Michaël Llodra	1	3
WC	(United States) Chase Buchanan	6	6
(India) Somdev Devvarman	1	3
14	(United States) Tim Smyczek	6	6

Qualifying competition
WC	(United States) Chase Buchanan	6	7^{7}
14	(United States) Tim Smyczek	4	6^{4}

==== Fifth qualifier ====
First round
5	(Australia) Bernard Tomic	7	6
(Uzbekistan) Farrukh Dustov	5	3
WC	(United States) Mackenzie McDonald	2	1
10	(Australia) Matthew Ebden	6	6

Qualifying competition
5	(Australia) Bernard Tomic	6	7^{7}
10	(Australia) Matthew Ebden	3	6^{5}

==== Sixth qualifier ====
First round
6	(Germany) Tobias Kamke	4	4
Alt	(United Kingdom) James Ward	6	6
WC	(United States) Devin McCarthy	1	6	3
9	(France) Paul-Henri Mathieu	6	2	6

Qualifying competition
Alt	(United Kingdom) James Ward	7^{10}	7
9	(France) Paul-Henri Mathieu	6^{8}	5

==== Seventh qualifier ====
First round
7	(Slovenia) Blaž Rola	7^{7}	7^{8}
(Russia) Evgeny Donskoy	6^{4}	6^{6}
Alt	(Germany) Alexander Zverev	1	3
11	(France) Benoît Paire	6	6

Qualifying competition
7	(Slovenia) Blaž Rola	2	2
11	(France) Benoît Paire	6	6
