= 2015 BNP Paribas Open – Women's doubles =

Women's doubles
- 2015 BNP Paribas Open

Final
- Champions: (Switzerland) Martina Hingis (India) Sania Mirza
- Runners-up: (Russia) Ekaterina Makarova (Russia) Elena Vesnina
- Score: 6–3, 6–4

Events
Singles	men	women
Doubles	men	women
← 2014 ·	BNP Paribas Open	· 2016 →

Hsieh Su-wei and Peng Shuai were the defending champions, but Peng withdrew from the tournament with a back injury. Hsieh played alongside Flavia Pennetta, but lost in the first round to Klaudia Jans-Ignacik and Andreja Klepač.

First-time pairing Martina Hingis and Sania Mirza won the title, defeating Ekaterina Makarova and Elena Vesnina in the final, 6–3, 6–4.

== Seeds ==
1. (Switzerland) Martina Hingis / (India) Sania Mirza (champions)
2. (Russia) Ekaterina Makarova / (Russia) Elena Vesnina (final)
3. (United States) Raquel Kops-Jones / (United States) Abigail Spears (first round)
4. (Chinese Taipei) Hsieh Su-wei / (Italy) Flavia Pennetta (first round)
5. (Spain) Garbiñe Muguruza / (Spain) Carla Suárez Navarro (second round)
6. (Hungary) Tímea Babos / (France) Kristina Mladenovic (first round)
7. (France) Caroline Garcia / (Slovenia) Katarina Srebotnik (quarterfinals)
8. (Czech Republic) Andrea Hlaváčková / (Czech Republic) Lucie Hradecká (second round)

== Draw ==
=== Key ===
- Q = Qualifier
- WC = Wild card
- LL = Lucky loser
- Alt = Alternate
- SE = Special exempt
- PR = Protected ranking
- ITF = ITF entry
- JE = Junior exempt
- w/o = Walkover
- r = Retired
- d = Defaulted
- SR = Special ranking

=== Finals ===
Semifinals
1	(Switzerland) Martina Hingis (India) Sania Mirza	6	6
(United States) Lisa Raymond (Australia) Samantha Stosur	0	4
(Poland) Klaudia Jans-Ignacik (Slovenia) Andreja Klepač	4	1
2	(Russia) Ekaterina Makarova (Russia) Elena Vesnina	6	6

Final
1	(Switzerland) Martina Hingis (India) Sania Mirza	6	6
2	(Russia) Ekaterina Makarova (Russia) Elena Vesnina	3	4

=== Top half ===
First round
1	(Switzerland) M Hingis (India) S Mirza	6	6
(Czech Republic) Ka Plíšková (Slovakia) M Rybáriková	2	1
(Russia) A Kudryavtseva (Russia) A Pavlyuchenkova	7	7
(Canada) G Dabrowski (Poland) A Rosolska	5	5
(Germany) J Görges (Germany) A-L Grönefeld	1	4
WC	(Slovakia) D Hantuchová (Italy) K Knapp	6	6
(New Zealand) M Erakovic (Spain) A Parra Santonja	1	4
5	(Spain) G Muguruza (Spain) C Suárez Navarro	6	6
3	(United States) R Kops-Jones (United States) A Spears	4	6	[8]
WC	(United States) S Stephens (United States) T Townsend	6	2	[10]
(Spain) L Arruabarrena (Spain) A Medina Garrigues	6	3	[8]
(Israel) S Pe'er (Russia) V Zvonareva	1	6	[10]
(Japan) S Aoyama (Czech Republic) R Voráčová	5	3
(United States) L Raymond (Australia) S Stosur	7	6
(Romania) M Niculescu (Russia) A Panova	3	7^{7}	[11]
6	(Hungary) T Babos (France) K Mladenovic	6	6^{4}	[9]

Second round
1	(Switzerland) M Hingis (India) S Mirza	6	6
(Russia) A Kudryavtseva (Russia) A Pavlyuchenkova	3	2
WC	(Slovakia) D Hantuchová (Italy) K Knapp	6	7^{7}
5	(Spain) G Muguruza (Spain) C Suárez Navarro	3	6^{0}
WC	(United States) S Stephens (United States) T Townsend
(Israel) S Pe'er (Russia) V Zvonareva	w/o
(United States) L Raymond (Australia) S Stosur	6	6
(Romania) M Niculescu (Russia) A Panova	3	2

Quarterfinals
1	(Switzerland) M Hingis (India) S Mirza	6	6
WC	(Slovakia) D Hantuchová (Italy) K Knapp	4	2
(Israel) S Pe'er (Russia) V Zvonareva	2	1
(United States) L Raymond (Australia) S Stosur	6	6

Semifinals
1	(Switzerland) M Hingis (India) S Mirza	6	6
(United States) L Raymond (Australia) S Stosur	0	4

=== Bottom half ===
First round
8	(Czech Republic) A Hlaváčková (Czech Republic) L Hradecká	6	6
(Australia) J Gajdošová (Spain) MT Torró Flor	1	2
(Chinese Taipei) H-c Chan (Serbia) J Janković	1	7^{7}	[5]
(Germany) S Lisicki (Germany) A Petkovic	6	6^{4}	[10]
(Australia) An Rodionova (Australia) Ar Rodionova	6	2	[10]
WC	(Russia) S Kuznetsova (United States) C Vandeweghe	4	6	[12]
(Poland) K Jans-Ignacik (Slovenia) A Klepač	6	3	[10]
4	(Chinese Taipei) S-w Hsieh (Italy) F Pennetta	1	6	[8]
7	(France) C Garcia (Slovenia) K Srebotnik	6	6
WC	(Serbia) A Ivanovic (Germany) A Kerber	4	4
(United States) B Mattek-Sands (Czech Republic) L Šafářová	6	5	[9]
(Romania) R Olaru (Ukraine) O Savchuk	3	7	[11]
(Croatia) D Jurak (Czech Republic) K Koukalová	7	5	[6]
(Netherlands) M Krajicek (Czech Republic) B Záhlavová-Strýcová	5	7	[10]
(Chinese Taipei) C-j Chuang (Spain) S Soler Espinosa	6	0	[8]
2	(Russia) E Makarova (Russia) E Vesnina	4	6	[10]

Second round
8	(Czech Republic) A Hlaváčková (Czech Republic) L Hradecká	3	4
(Germany) S Lisicki (Germany) A Petkovic	6	6
WC	(Russia) S Kuznetsova (United States) C Vandeweghe	2	3
(Poland) K Jans-Ignacik (Slovenia) A Klepač	6	6
7	(France) C Garcia (Slovenia) K Srebotnik	6	6
(Romania) R Olaru (Ukraine) O Savchuk	0	4
(Netherlands) M Krajicek (Czech Republic) B Záhlavová-Strýcová	3	4
2	(Russia) E Makarova (Russia) E Vesnina	6	6

Quarterfinals
(Germany) S Lisicki (Germany) A Petkovic	6^{5}	6^{7}
(Poland) K Jans-Ignacik (Slovenia) A Klepač	7^{7}	7^{9}
7	(France) C Garcia (Slovenia) K Srebotnik	5	4
2	(Russia) E Makarova (Russia) E Vesnina	7	6

Semifinals
(Poland) K Jans-Ignacik (Slovenia) A Klepač	4	1
2	(Russia) E Makarova (Russia) E Vesnina	6	6
