= 2012 Rogers Cup – Women's doubles =

Women's doubles
- 2012 Rogers Cup

Final
- Champions: (Poland) Klaudia Jans-Ignacik (France) Kristina Mladenovic
- Runners-up: (Russia) Nadia Petrova (Slovenia) Katarina Srebotnik
- Score: 7–5, 2–6, [10–7]

Details
- Draw: 28
- Seeds: 8

Events
Singles	men	women
Doubles	men	women
- Rogers Cup

Liezel Huber and Lisa Raymond were the defending champions but lost to Nadia Petrova and Katarina Srebotnik in the semifinals 6–4, 6–4.
Klaudia Jans-Ignacik and Kristina Mladenovic won the title by defeating Nadia Petrova and Katarina Srebotnik 7–5, 2–6, [10–7] in the final.

== Seeds ==
The top four seeds receive a bye into the second round.

1. (United States) Liezel Huber / (United States) Lisa Raymond (semifinals)
2. (Italy) Sara Errani / (Italy) Roberta Vinci (second round)
3. (Russia) Nadia Petrova / (Slovenia) Katarina Srebotnik (final)
4. (Argentina) Gisela Dulko / (Italy) Flavia Pennetta (withdrew because of Pennetta's right wrist injury)
5. (Spain) Nuria Llagostera Vives / (Spain) María José Martínez Sánchez (first round)
6. (United States) Raquel Kops-Jones / (United States) Abigail Spears (second round)
7. (Germany) Julia Görges / (Czech Republic) Květa Peschke (first round)
8. (Czech Republic) Iveta Benešová / (Czech Republic) Barbora Záhlavová-Strýcová (first round)

== Draw ==
Key

- Q = Qualifier
- WC = Wild card
- LL = Lucky loser
- Alt = Alternate
- ITF = ITF entry
- PR = Protected ranking
- SR = Special ranking
- SE = Special exempt
- JE = Junior exempt
- JR = Junior Accelerator Programme entrant
- CO = College Accelerator Programme entrant
- NG = Next Gen Accelerator Program entrant
- w/o = Walkover
- r = Retired
- d = Defaulted

=== Finals ===
Semifinals
1	(United States) Liezel Huber (United States) Lisa Raymond	4	4
3	(Russia) Nadia Petrova (Slovenia) Katarina Srebotnik	6	6
(Australia) Anastasia Rodionova (Kazakhstan) Galina Voskoboeva	3	6^{5}
(Poland) Klaudia Jans-Ignacik (France) Kristina Mladenovic	6	7^{7}

Final
3	(Russia) Nadia Petrova (Slovenia) Katarina Srebotnik	5	6	[7]
(Poland) Klaudia Jans-Ignacik (France) Kristina Mladenovic	7	2	[10]

=== Top half ===
First round
(Russia) V Dushevina (Thailand) T Tanasugarn	7	5	[10]
(Slovakia) J Husárová (Israel) S Pe'er	5	7	[7]
(South Africa) N Grandin (Czech Republic) V Uhlířová	6^{4}	6	[10]
(Croatia) D Jurak (Hungary) K Marosi	7^{7}	4	[8]
(Germany) S Lisicki (China) S Peng	6	6
8	(Czech Republic) I Benešová (Czech Republic) B Záhlavová-Strýcová	2	1
(Chinese Taipei) C-j Chuang (China) S Zhang	3	7	[11]
(Slovenia) A Klepač (Georgia (country)) A Tatishvili	6	5	[9]
(Slovakia) D Cibulková (Slovakia) D Hantuchová	5	6	[12]
WC	(Canada) S Fichman (Canada) M-È Pelletier	7	3	[10]
(United States) B Mattek-Sands (India) S Mirza	7^{7}	6
7	(Germany) J Görges (Czech Republic) K Peschke	6^{1}	3

Second round
1	(United States) L Huber (United States) L Raymond	6	6
(Russia) V Dushevina (Thailand) T Tanasugarn	1	3
(South Africa) N Grandin (Czech Republic) V Uhlířová	5	4
(Germany) S Lisicki (China) S Peng	7	6
3	(Russia) N Petrova (Slovenia) K Srebotnik	6^{8}	6	[11]
(Chinese Taipei) C-j Chuang (China) S Zhang	7^{10}	4	[9]
(Slovakia) D Cibulková (Slovakia) D Hantuchová	2	3
(United States) B Mattek-Sands (India) S Mirza	6	6

Quarterfinals
1	(United States) L Huber (United States) L Raymond	6
(Germany) S Lisicki (China) S Peng	5^{r}
3	(Russia) N Petrova (Slovenia) K Srebotnik	1	7	[10]
(United States) B Mattek-Sands (India) S Mirza	6	5	[5]

Semifinals
1	(United States) L Huber (United States) L Raymond	4	4
3	(Russia) N Petrova (Slovenia) K Srebotnik	6	6

=== Bottom half ===
First round
6	(United States) R Kops-Jones (United States) A Spears	6	6
WC	(Canada) E Bouchard (Canada) A Wozniak	2	2
(Russia) A Kudryavtseva (Luxembourg) M Minella	0	3
(Australia) A Rodionova (Kazakhstan) G Voskoboeva	6	6
(United States) L Lee-Waters (United States) M Moulton-Levy	6	3	[4]
(Chinese Taipei) H-c Chan (Chinese Taipei) Y-j Chan	2	6	[10]
5	(Spain) N Llagostera Vives (Spain) M J Martínez Sánchez	6^{8}	3
(Poland) K Jans-Ignacik (France) K Mladenovic	7^{10}	6
(Russia) A Pavlyuchenkova (Czech Republic) L Šafářová	6	3	[11]
(Hungary) T Babos (Greece) E Daniilidou	1	6	[9]
(Latvia) L Dekmeijere (Poland) A Rosolska	6	1	[8]
(Russia) E Makarova (Ukraine) O Savchuk	3	6	[10]

Second round
6	(United States) R Kops-Jones (United States) A Spears	6	6^{6}	[2]
(Australia) A Rodionova (Kazakhstan) G Voskoboeva	2	7^{8}	[10]
(Chinese Taipei) H-c Chan (Chinese Taipei) Y-j Chan	6	6
Alt	(United States) J Craybas (Spain) C Suárez Navarro	1	0
(Poland) K Jans-Ignacik (France) K Mladenovic	7	6^{8}	[10]
(Russia) A Pavlyuchenkova (Czech Republic) L Šafářová	5	7^{10}	[8]
(Russia) E Makarova (Ukraine) O Savchuk	6	2	[10]
2	(Italy) S Errani (Italy) R Vinci	3	6	[5]

Quarterfinals
(Australia) A Rodionova (Kazakhstan) G Voskoboeva	6	2	[10]
(Chinese Taipei) H-c Chan (Chinese Taipei) Y-j Chan	4	6	[8]
(Poland) K Jans-Ignacik (France) K Mladenovic	6	6^{3}	[10]
(Russia) E Makarova (Ukraine) O Savchuk	3	7^{7}	[6]

Semifinals
(Australia) A Rodionova (Kazakhstan) G Voskoboeva	3	6^{5}
(Poland) K Jans-Ignacik (France) K Mladenovic	6	7^{7}
