= 2014 Western & Southern Open =

- Date: August 11–17
- Edition: 113th (men) / 86th (women)
- Category: ATP World Tour Masters 1000 (men); WTA Premier 5 (women)
- Surface: Hard / outdoor
- Location: Mason, Ohio, United States
- Venue: Lindner Family Tennis Center

Champions

Men's singles
- (Switzerland) Roger Federer

Women's singles
- (United States) Serena Williams

Men's doubles
- (United States) Bob Bryan / (United States) Mike Bryan

Women's doubles
- (United States) Raquel Kops-Jones / (United States) Abigail Spears
- Cincinnati Masters

The 2014 Western & Southern Open (the Cincinnati Masters) was a men's and women's tennis tournament that was played on outdoor hard courts August 11–17, 2014. It was part of the ATP World Tour Masters 1000 of the 2014 ATP World Tour and of the WTA Premier 5 tournaments of the 2014 WTA Tour. The 2014 tournament was the men's 113th edition and the women's 86th edition of the Cincinnati Masters. The tournament is held annually at the Lindner Family Tennis Center in Mason (a suburb of Cincinnati), Ohio, United States.

Rafael Nadal and Victoria Azarenka were the defending champions, but both had to withdraw from the tournament due to injuries.

== Points and prize money ==
=== Point distribution ===
Event	W	F	SF	QF	Round of 16	Round of 32	Round of 64	Q	Q2	Q1
Men's singles	1000	600	360	180	90	45	10	25	16	0
Men's doubles	1000	600	360	180	90	0	—N/a	—N/a	—N/a	—N/a
Women's singles	900	585	350	190	105	60	1	30	20	1
Women's doubles	900	585	350	190	105	1	—N/a	—N/a	—N/a	—N/a

=== Prize money ===
Event	W	F	SF	QF	Round of 16	Round of 32	Round of 64	Q2	Q1
Men's singles	$638,850	$313,240	$157,645	$80,165	$41,625	$21,945	$11,850	$2,730	$1,390
Women's singles	$467,300	$227,000	$113,770	$54,170	$26,090	$13,370	$7,215	$2,930	$1,775
Men's doubles	$197,830	$96,860	$48,580	$24,940	$12,890	$6,800	—N/a	—N/a	—N/a
Women's doubles	$133,700	$67,530	$33,430	$16,830	$8,530	$4,210	—N/a	—N/a	—N/a

== ATP singles main-draw entrants ==
=== Seeds ===
Country	Player	Ranking	Seed
SRB	Novak Djokovic	1	1
SUI	Roger Federer	3	2
SUI	Stan Wawrinka	4	3
CZE	Tomáš Berdych	5	4
CAN	Milos Raonic	6	5
ESP	David Ferrer	7	6
BUL	Grigor Dimitrov	8	7
GBR	Andy Murray	9	8
LAT	Ernests Gulbis	12	9
~~FRA~~	~~Richard Gasquet~~	~~13~~	~~10~~
USA	John Isner	14	11
FRA	Jo-Wilfried Tsonga	15	12
ESP	Roberto Bautista Agut	16	13
CRO	Marin Čilić	18	14
ITA	Fabio Fognini	19	15
ESP	Tommy Robredo	20	16

- Rankings are as of August 4, 2014

=== Other entrants ===
The following players received wild cards into the main singles draw:

- (United States) Robby Ginepri
- (United States) Steve Johnson
- (United States) Sam Querrey
- (United States) Jack Sock

The following player used protected ranking to gain entry into the singles main draw:

- (Austria) Jürgen Melzer

The following players received entry from the singles qualifying draw:

- (Germany) Benjamin Becker
- (United States) Chase Buchanan
- (Russia) Teymuraz Gabashvili
- (Australia) Marinko Matosevic
- (France) Benoît Paire
- (Australia) Bernard Tomic
- (United Kingdom) James Ward

The following player received entry as a lucky loser:

- (Slovenia) Blaž Rola

=== Withdrawals ===
Before the tournament

- (Spain) Nicolás Almagro (foot injury) → replaced by (Uzbekistan) Denis Istomin
- (Argentina) Carlos Berlocq → replaced by (France) Édouard Roger-Vasselin
- (Argentina) Juan Martín del Potro (wrist injury) → replaced by (Slovakia) Martin Kližan
- (Ukraine) Alexandr Dolgopolov (knee injury) → replaced by (France) Julien Benneteau
- (France) Richard Gasquet (abdominal injury) → replaced by (Slovenia) Blaž Rola
- (Germany) Tommy Haas (shoulder injury) → replaced by (Chinese Taipei) Lu Yen-hsun
- (Germany) Florian Mayer (groin injury) → replaced by (Australia) Lleyton Hewitt
- (Spain) Rafael Nadal (wrist injury) → replaced by (France) Gilles Simon
- (Japan) Kei Nishikori (foot injury) → replaced by (France) Nicolas Mahut
- (Russia) Dmitry Tursunov → replaced by (Austria) Dominic Thiem

== ATP doubles main-draw entrants ==
=== Seeds ===
Country	Player	Country	Player	Rank^{1}	Seed
USA	Bob Bryan	USA	Mike Bryan	2	1
AUT	Alexander Peya	BRA	Bruno Soares	6	2
CAN	Daniel Nestor	SRB	Nenad Zimonjić	11	3
CRO	Ivan Dodig	BRA	Marcelo Melo	16	4
IND	Leander Paes	CZE	Radek Štěpánek	20	5
FRA	Julien Benneteau	FRA	Édouard Roger-Vasselin	22	6
ESP	Marcel Granollers	ESP	Marc López	28	7
ESP	David Marrero	ESP	Fernando Verdasco	28	8

- Rankings are as of August 4, 2014

=== Other entrants ===
The following pairs received wildcards into the doubles main draw:

- (United States) Steve Johnson / (United States) Sam Querrey
- (United States) Mackenzie McDonald / (United States) Tim Smyczek

The following pair received entry as alternates:

- (United Kingdom) Jamie Murray / (Australia) John Peers

=== Withdrawals ===
Before the tournament

- (France) Michaël Llodra (right elbow injury)

== WTA singles main-draw entrants ==
=== Seeds ===
Country	Player	Ranking	Seeds
USA	Serena Williams	1	1
ROU	Simona Halep	3	2
CZE	Petra Kvitová	4	3
POL	Agnieszka Radwańska	5	4
RUS	Maria Sharapova	6	5
GER	Angelique Kerber	7	6
CAN	Eugenie Bouchard	8	7
SRB	Jelena Janković	9	8
SRB	Ana Ivanovic	10	9
~~BLR~~	~~Victoria Azarenka~~	~~11~~	~~10~~
SVK	Dominika Cibulková	12	11
DEN	Caroline Wozniacki	13	12
ITA	Flavia Pennetta	14	13
ITA	Sara Errani	15	14
ESP	Carla Suárez Navarro	16	15
CZE	Lucie Šafářová	17	16

- Rankings are as of August 4, 2014

=== Other entrants ===
The following players received wild cards into the main singles draw:

- (Switzerland) Belinda Bencic
- (United States) Lauren Davis
- (United States) Christina McHale

The following player used protected ranking to gain entry into the singles main draw:

- (Switzerland) Romina Oprandi

The following players received entry from the singles qualifying draw:

- (Germany) Annika Beck
- (Romania) Irina-Camelia Begu
- (Kazakhstan) Zarina Diyas
- (United States) Nicole Gibbs
- (Slovenia) Polona Hercog
- (Italy) Karin Knapp
- (United States) Varvara Lepchenko
- (France) Pauline Parmentier
- (South Africa) Chanelle Scheepers
- (United States) Taylor Townsend
- (United Kingdom) Heather Watson
- (Belgium) Yanina Wickmayer

The following player received entry as a lucky loser:

- (Germany) Mona Barthel

=== Withdrawals ===
Before the tournament

- (Belarus) Victoria Azarenka (knee injury) → replaced by (Germany) Mona Barthel
- (China) Li Na (knee injury) → replaced by (Switzerland) Romina Oprandi
- (Austria) Yvonne Meusburger → replaced by (Bulgaria) Tsvetana Pironkova

== WTA doubles main-draw entrants ==
=== Seeds ===
Country	Player	Country	Player	Rank^{1}	Seed
ITA	Sara Errani	ITA	Roberta Vinci	2	1
TPE	Hsieh Su-wei	CHN	Peng Shuai	7	2
CZE	Květa Peschke	SLO	Katarina Srebotnik	13	3
ZIM	Cara Black	IND	Sania Mirza	15	4
RUS	Ekaterina Makarova	RUS	Elena Vesnina	17	5
HUN	Tímea Babos	FRA	Kristina Mladenovic	27	6
USA	Raquel Kops-Jones	USA	Abigail Spears	36	7
RUS	Alla Kudryavtseva	AUS	Anastasia Rodionova	40	8

- Rankings are as of August 4, 2014

=== Other entrants ===
The following pairs received wildcards into the doubles main draw:

- (United States) Nicole Gibbs / (United States) Alison Riske
- (United States) Melanie Oudin / (United States) Taylor Townsend

The following pair received entry as alternates:

- (Georgia (country)) Oksana Kalashnikova / (Ukraine) Olga Savchuk

=== Withdrawals ===
Before the tournament

- (China) Zhang Shuai (right arm injury)

=== Retirements ===
- (Poland) Klaudia Jans-Ignacik (right calf injury)
- (France) Kristina Mladenovic (lumbar spine injury)

== Finals ==
=== Men's singles ===
- (Switzerland) Roger Federer defeated (Spain) David Ferrer, 6–3, 1–6, 6–2

=== Women's singles ===
- (United States) Serena Williams defeated (Serbia) Ana Ivanovic, 6–4, 6–1

=== Men's doubles ===
- (United States) Bob Bryan / (United States) Mike Bryan defeated (Canada) Vasek Pospisil / (United States) Jack Sock, 6–3, 6–2

=== Women's doubles ===
- (United States) Raquel Kops-Jones / (United States) Abigail Spears defeated (Hungary) Tímea Babos / (France) Kristina Mladenovic, 6–1, 2–0, ret.
