= 2014 Western & Southern Open – Women's doubles =

Women's doubles
- 2014 Western & Southern Open

Final
- Champions: (United States) Raquel Kops-Jones (United States) Abigail Spears
- Runners-up: (Hungary) Tímea Babos (France) Kristina Mladenovic
- Score: 6–1, 2–0, ret.

Details
- Seeds: 8

Events
Singles	men	women
Doubles	men	women
← 2013 ·	Western & Southern Open	· 2015 →

Hsieh Su-wei and Peng Shuai were the defending champions, but lost in the second round to Anastasia Pavlyuchenkova and Lucie Šafářová.
Raquel Kops-Jones and Abigail Spears won the title, defeating Tímea Babos and Kristina Mladenovic in the final, 6–1, 2–0, ret.

== Seeds ==
The top four seeds received a bye into the second round.

1. (Italy) Sara Errani / (Italy) Roberta Vinci (quarterfinals)
2. (Chinese Taipei) Hsieh Su-wei / (China) Peng Shuai (second round)
3. (Czech Republic) Květa Peschke / (Slovenia) Katarina Srebotnik (second round)
4. (Zimbabwe) Cara Black / (India) Sania Mirza (second round)
5. (Russia) Ekaterina Makarova / (Russia) Elena Vesnina (second round)
6. (Hungary) Tímea Babos / (France) Kristina Mladenovic (final, retired)
7. (United States) Raquel Kops-Jones / (United States) Abigail Spears (champions)
8. (Russia) Alla Kudryavtseva / (Australia) Anastasia Rodionova (semifinals)

== Draw ==
=== Key ===
- Q = Qualifier
- WC = Wild card
- LL = Lucky loser
- Alt = Alternate
- SE = Special exempt
- PR = Protected ranking
- ITF = ITF entry
- JE = Junior exempt
- w/o = Walkover
- r = Retired
- d = Defaulted
- SR = Special ranking

=== Finals ===
Semifinals
6	(Hungary) Tímea Babos (France) Kristina Mladenovic	6	1	[10]
(Japan) Kimiko Date-Krumm (Czech Republic) Andrea Hlaváčková	4	6	[7]
8	(Russia) Alla Kudryavtseva (Australia) Anastasia Rodionova	5	5
7	(United States) Raquel Kops-Jones (United States) Abigail Spears	7	7

Final
6	(Hungary) Tímea Babos (France) Kristina Mladenovic	1	0^{r}
7	(United States) Raquel Kops-Jones (United States) Abigail Spears	6	2

=== Top half ===
First round
(Slovakia) D Hantuchová (Czech Republic) B Záhlavová-Strýcová	6	6
(Czech Republic) L Hradecká (Netherlands) M Krajicek	2	1
WC	(United States) N Gibbs (United States) A Riske	5	4
(Poland) K Jans-Ignacik (Czech Republic) Ka Plíšková	7	6
(Germany) J Görges (Germany) A-L Grönefeld	2	3
6	(Hungary) T Babos (France) K Mladenovic	6	6
(Japan) K Date-Krumm (Czech Republic) A Hlaváčková	3	6	[10]
(Australia) C Dellacqua (Croatia) M Lučić-Baroni	6	1	[3]
(Spain) G Muguruza (Spain) C Suárez Navarro	7	6
(Slovenia) A Klepač (Spain) S Soler Espinosa	5	3
(Canada) G Dabrowski (Poland) A Rosolska	1	1
5	(Russia) E Makarova (Russia) E Vesnina	6	6

Second round
1	(Italy) S Errani (Italy) R Vinci	6	7
(Slovakia) D Hantuchová (Czech Republic) B Záhlavová-Strýcová	3	5
(Poland) K Jans-Ignacik (Czech Republic) Ka Plíšková	6^{r}
6	(Hungary) T Babos (France) K Mladenovic	6
3	(Czech Republic) K Peschke (Slovenia) K Srebotnik	4	6	[6]
(Japan) K Date-Krumm (Czech Republic) A Hlaváčková	6	0	[10]
(Spain) G Muguruza (Spain) C Suárez Navarro	7^{7}	1	[12]
5	(Russia) E Makarova (Russia) E Vesnina	6^{1}	6	[10]

Quarterfinals
1	(Italy) S Errani (Italy) R Vinci	6	1	[8]
6	(Hungary) T Babos (France) K Mladenovic	2	6	[10]
(Japan) K Date-Krumm (Czech Republic) A Hlaváčková	7	6
(Spain) G Muguruza (Spain) C Suárez Navarro	5	3

Semifinals
6	(Hungary) T Babos (France) K Mladenovic	6	1	[10]
(Japan) K Date-Krumm (Czech Republic) A Hlaváčková	4	6	[7]

=== Bottom half ===
First round
8	(Russia) A Kudryavtseva (Australia) A Rodionova	6	6
(Chinese Taipei) H-c Chan (Chinese Taipei) Y-j Chan	4	3
Alt	(Georgia (country)) O Kalashnikova (Ukraine) O Savchuk	6	4	[9]
(New Zealand) M Erakovic (Spain) A Parra Santonja	1	6	[11]
(Spain) A Medina Garrigues (Kazakhstan) Y Shvedova	6	6
(Germany) A Petkovic (Slovakia) M Rybáriková	4	4
7	(United States) R Kops-Jones (United States) A Spears	6	6
(France) C Garcia (Romania) M Niculescu	2	1
WC	(United States) M Oudin (United States) T Townsend	0	6	[11]
(Serbia) J Janković (Czech Republic) K Koukalová	6	0	[9]
(Switzerland) M Hingis (Italy) F Pennetta	6^{8}	6	[6]
(Russia) A Pavlyuchenkova (Czech Republic) L Šafářová	7^{10}	1	[10]

Second round
8	(Russia) A Kudryavtseva (Australia) A Rodionova	6	6
(New Zealand) M Erakovic (Spain) A Parra Santonja	3	2
(Spain) A Medina Garrigues (Kazakhstan) Y Shvedova	6	6
4	(Zimbabwe) C Black (India) S Mirza	3	3
7	(United States) R Kops-Jones (United States) A Spears	6	6
WC	(United States) M Oudin (United States) T Townsend	3	1
(Russia) A Pavlyuchenkova (Czech Republic) L Šafářová	3	7	[10]
2	(Chinese Taipei) S-w Hsieh (China) S Peng	6	5	[5]

Quarterfinals
8	(Russia) A Kudryavtseva (Australia) A Rodionova	6	6
(Spain) A Medina Garrigues (Kazakhstan) Y Shvedova	2	1
7	(United States) R Kops-Jones (United States) A Spears	5	6	[10]
(Russia) A Pavlyuchenkova (Czech Republic) L Šafářová	7	2	[7]

Semifinals
8	(Russia) A Kudryavtseva (Australia) A Rodionova	5	5
7	(United States) R Kops-Jones (United States) A Spears	7	7
