= 2014 Western & Southern Open – Women's singles =

Women's singles
- 2014 Western & Southern Open

Final
- Champion: (United States) Serena Williams
- Runner-up: (Serbia) Ana Ivanovic
- Score: 6–4, 6–1

Details
- Draw: 56
- Seeds: 16

Events
Singles	men	women
Doubles	men	women
- Western & Southern Open

Serena Williams defeated Ana Ivanovic in the final, 6–4, 6–1 to win the women's singles tennis title at the 2014 Cincinnati Masters.

Victoria Azarenka was the reigning champion, but withdrew due to a right knee injury.

== Seeds ==
The top eight seeds received a bye into the second round.

1. (United States) Serena Williams (champion)
2. (Romania) Simona Halep (quarterfinals)
3. (Czech Republic) Petra Kvitová (second round)
4. (Poland) Agnieszka Radwańska (quarterfinals)
5. (Russia) Maria Sharapova (semifinals)
6. (Germany) Angelique Kerber (third round)
7. (Canada) Eugenie Bouchard (second round)
8. (Serbia) Jelena Janković (quarterfinals)

9. (Serbia) Ana Ivanovic (final)
10. (Belarus) Victoria Azarenka (withdrew because of a right knee injury)
11. (Slovakia) Dominika Cibulková (first round)
12. (Denmark) Caroline Wozniacki (semifinals)
13. (Italy) Flavia Pennetta (third round)
14. (Italy) Sara Errani (second round)
15. (Spain) Carla Suárez Navarro (third round)
16. (Czech Republic) Lucie Šafářová (third round)

Click on the seed number of a player to go to their draw section.

== Draw ==
Key

- Q = Qualifier
- WC = Wild card
- LL = Lucky loser
- Alt = Alternate
- ITF = ITF entry
- PR = Protected ranking
- SR = Special ranking
- SE = Special exempt
- JE = Junior exempt
- JR = Junior Accelerator Programme entrant
- CO = College Accelerator Programme entrant
- NG = Next Gen Accelerator Program entrant
- w/o = Walkover
- r = Retired
- d = Defaulted

=== Finals ===
Quarterfinals
1	(United States) Serena Williams	6	6
8	(Serbia) Jelena Janković	1	3
4	(Poland) Agnieszka Radwańska	4	6^{5}
12	(Denmark) Caroline Wozniacki	6	7^{7}
9	(Serbia) Ana Ivanovic	6	6
(Ukraine) Elina Svitolina	2	3
5	(Russia) Maria Sharapova	3	6	6
2	(Romania) Simona Halep	6	4	4

Semifinals
1	(United States) Serena Williams	2	6	6
12	(Denmark) Caroline Wozniacki	6	2	4
9	(Serbia) Ana Ivanovic	6	5	7
5	(Russia) Maria Sharapova	2	7	5

Final
1	(United States) Serena Williams	6	6
9	(Serbia) Ana Ivanovic	4	1

=== Top half ===
==== Section 1 ====
First round
(Australia) S Stosur	6	7
Q	(United States) V Lepchenko	2	5
(Czech Republic) K Koukalová	3	6	5
Q	(United States) T Townsend	6	4	7
Q	(South Africa) C Scheepers	3	7^{7}	2
13	(Italy) F Pennetta	6	6^{3}	6
LL	(Germany) M Barthel	5	0
(Czech Republic) B Záhlavová-Strýcová	7	6
(Germany) A Petkovic	3	3
(United States) S Stephens	6	6
(Spain) G Muguruza	3	6	3
Q	(Germany) A Beck	6	2	6

Second round
1	(United States) S Williams	7^{9}	7^{9}
(Australia) S Stosur	6^{7}	6^{7}
Q	(United States) T Townsend	4	3
13	(Italy) F Pennetta	6	6
(Czech Republic) B Záhlavová-Strýcová	5	1
(United States) S Stephens	7	6
Q	(Germany) A Beck	1	6^{0}
8	(Serbia) J Janković	6	7^{7}

Third round
1	(United States) S Williams	6	6
13	(Italy) F Pennetta	2	2
(United States) S Stephens	6^{4}	4
8	(Serbia) J Janković	7^{7}	6

Quarterfinals
1	(United States) S Williams	6	6
8	(Serbia) J Janković	1	3

==== Section 2 ====
First round
(Japan) K Nara	6	6
PR	(Switzerland) R Oprandi	0	2
(Italy) R Vinci	3	6	2
(Germany) S Lisicki	6	2	6
Q	(Belgium) Y Wickmayer	5	6	6^{2}
14	(Italy) S Errani	7	3	7^{7}
12	(Denmark) C Wozniacki	6	6
(Slovakia) M Rybáriková	2	3
(China) S Zhang	6	2	7
Q	(United Kingdom) H Watson	3	6	5
(Slovakia) D Hantuchová	2	2
(Russia) E Makarova	6	6

Second round
4	(Poland) A Radwańska	6	6
(Japan) K Nara	2	2
(Germany) S Lisicki	6	2	7^{7}
14	(Italy) S Errani	4	6	6^{2}
12	(Denmark) C Wozniacki	6	6
(China) S Zhang	2	3
(Russia) E Makarova	4	1
6	(Germany) A Kerber	6	6

Third round
4	(Poland) A Radwańska	6	6
(Germany) S Lisicki	1	1
12	(Denmark) C Wozniacki	7	6
6	(Germany) A Kerber	5	2

Quarterfinals
4	(Poland) A Radwańska	4	6^{5}
12	(Denmark) C Wozniacki	6	7^{7}

=== Bottom half ===
==== Section 3 ====
First round
(Italy) C Giorgi	4	7^{7}	3
(Russia) S Kuznetsova	6	6^{4}	6
Q	(United States) N Gibbs	6	3	1
WC	(United States) C McHale	4	6	6
(Romania) S Cîrstea	1	5
9	(Serbia) A Ivanovic	6	7
15	(Spain) C Suárez Navarro	6	1	6
(Bulgaria) T Pironkova	3	6	2
Q	(France) P Parmentier	7^{7}	6
(Australia) C Dellacqua	6^{4}	2
(Ukraine) E Svitolina	6	6
WC	(United States) L Davis	3	2

Second round
7	(Canada) E Bouchard	4	6	2
(Russia) S Kuznetsova	6	3	6
WC	(United States) C McHale	4	0
9	(Serbia) A Ivanovic	6	6
15	(Spain) C Suárez Navarro	6	7
Q	(France) P Parmentier	3	5
(Ukraine) E Svitolina	6	7^{7}
3	(Czech Republic) P Kvitová	2	6^{2}

Third round
(Russia) S Kuznetsova	2	6	3
9	(Serbia) A Ivanovic	6	2	6
15	(Spain) C Suárez Navarro	6	4	4
(Ukraine) E Svitolina	4	6	6

Quarterfinals
9	(Serbia) A Ivanovic	6	6
(Ukraine) E Svitolina	2	3

==== Section 4 ====
First round
(France) A Cornet	2	4
(United States) M Keys	6	6
Q	(Italy) K Knapp	6	7^{7}
WC	(Switzerland) B Bencic	2	6^{1}
(Russia) A Pavlyuchenkova	6	6
11	(Slovakia) D Cibulková	3	3
16	(Czech Republic) L Šafářová	6^{2}	6	6
(United States) V Williams	7^{7}	3	4
Q	(Kazakhstan) Z Diyas	7^{7}	7^{7}
Q	(Romania) I-C Begu	6^{4}	6^{5}
Q	(Slovenia) P Hercog	3	2
(Belgium) K Flipkens	6	6

Second round
5	(Russia) M Sharapova	6	3	6
(United States) M Keys	1	6	3
Q	(Italy) K Knapp	1	3
(Russia) A Pavlyuchenkova	6	6
16	(Czech Republic) L Šafářová	6	6
Q	(Kazakhstan) Z Diyas	4	2
(Belgium) K Flipkens	4	2
2	(Romania) S Halep	6	6

Third round
5	(Russia) M Sharapova	6	7^{7}
(Russia) A Pavlyuchenkova	4	6^{2}
16	(Czech Republic) L Šafářová	4	5
2	(Romania) S Halep	6	7

Quarterfinals
5	(Russia) M Sharapova	3	6	6
2	(Romania) S Halep	6	4	4

== Qualifying ==
=== Seeds ===
1. (Serbia) Bojana Jovanovski (first round)
2. (China) Peng Shuai (withdrew, still playing in Montréal)
3. (Czech Republic) Karolína Plíšková (first round)
4. (Germany) Mona Barthel (qualifying competition, lucky loser)
5. (United States) Alison Riske (first round)
6. (United States) Varvara Lepchenko (qualified)
7. (France) Caroline Garcia (first round)
8. (Russia) Elena Vesnina (qualifying competition, retired)
9. (Kazakhstan) Zarina Diyas (qualified)
10. (Kazakhstan) Yaroslava Shvedova (first round)
11. (Croatia) Ajla Tomljanović (first round)
12. (United Kingdom) Heather Watson (qualified)
13. (Spain) María Teresa Torró Flor (qualifying competition)
14. (Romania) Irina-Camelia Begu (qualified)
15. (Romania) Monica Niculescu (qualifying competition)
16. (Belgium) Yanina Wickmayer (qualified)
17. (Puerto Rico) Monica Puig (qualifying competition)
18. (Germany) Annika Beck (qualified)
19. (Slovakia) Anna Schmiedlová (first round)
20. (Slovenia) Polona Hercog (qualified)
21. (Italy) Francesca Schiavone (qualifying competition)
22. (Spain) Sílvia Soler Espinosa (qualifying competition)
23. (South Africa) Chanelle Scheepers (qualified)
24. (New Zealand) Marina Erakovic (first round)
25. (Italy) Karin Knapp (qualified)

=== Qualifiers ===
1. (Slovenia) Polona Hercog
2. (Italy) Karin Knapp
3. (France) Pauline Parmentier
4. (Germany) Annika Beck
5. (United States) Taylor Townsend
6. (United States) Varvara Lepchenko
7. (South Africa) Chanelle Scheepers
8. (Romania) Irina-Camelia Begu
9. (Kazakhstan) Zarina Diyas
10. (United States) Nicole Gibbs
11. (Belgium) Yanina Wickmayer
12. (United Kingdom) Heather Watson

=== Lucky losers ===
1. (Germany) Mona Barthel

=== Qualifying draw ===
==== First qualifier ====
First round
1	(Serbia) Bojana Jovanovski	5	2
(Israel) Julia Glushko	7	6
(Argentina) Paula Ormaechea	2	6	3
20	(Slovenia) Polona Hercog	6	3	6

Qualifying competition
(Israel) Julia Glushko	3	1
20	(Slovenia) Polona Hercog	6	6

==== Second qualifier ====
First round
25	(Italy) Karin Knapp	6	6
Alt	(Poland) Urszula Radwańska	3	3
(Austria) Tamira Paszek	4	4
17	(Puerto Rico) Monica Puig	6	6

Qualifying competition
25	(Italy) Karin Knapp	2	6	7^{7}
17	(Puerto Rico) Monica Puig	6	3	6^{5}

==== Third qualifier ====
First round
3	(Czech Republic) Karolína Plíšková	6^{5}	6	6^{4}
(France) Pauline Parmentier	7^{7}	1	7^{7}
(Netherlands) Kiki Bertens	4	1
13	(Spain) María Teresa Torró Flor	6	6

Qualifying competition
(France) Pauline Parmentier	7^{8}	7^{7}
13	(Spain) María Teresa Torró Flor	6^{6}	6^{4}

==== Fourth qualifier ====
First round
4	(Germany) Mona Barthel	6	6
WC	(Kazakhstan) Yulia Putintseva	4	2
WC	(United States) Melanie Oudin	1	3
18	(Germany) Annika Beck	6	6

Qualifying competition
4	(Germany) Mona Barthel	2	3
18	(Germany) Annika Beck	6	6

==== Fifth qualifier ====
First round
5	(United States) Alison Riske	3	4
WC	(United States) Taylor Townsend	6	6
WC	(Czech Republic) Andrea Hlaváčková	3	2
22	(Spain) Sílvia Soler Espinosa	6	6

Qualifying competition
WC	(United States) Taylor Townsend	6	6
22	(Spain) Sílvia Soler Espinosa	4	3

==== Sixth qualifier ====
First round
6	(United States) Varvara Lepchenko	6	0
(Romania) Alexandra Dulgheru	4	0^{r}
(United States) Anna Tatishvili	6	6
19	(Slovakia) Anna Schmiedlová	1	2

Qualifying competition
6	(United States) Varvara Lepchenko	7	7^{7}
(United States) Anna Tatishvili	5	6^{1}

==== Seventh qualifier ====
First round
7	(France) Caroline Garcia	4	3
(Hungary) Tímea Babos	6	6
(Switzerland) Timea Bacsinszky	5	2
23	(South Africa) Chanelle Scheepers	7	6

Qualifying competition
(Hungary) Tímea Babos	0	4
23	(South Africa) Chanelle Scheepers	6	6

==== Eighth qualifier ====
First round
8	(Russia) Elena Vesnina	6	6
WC	(United States) Sachia Vickery	4	3
(Japan) Kimiko Date-Krumm	6	2	4
14	(Romania) Irina-Camelia Begu	1	6	6

Qualifying competition
8	(Russia) Elena Vesnina	4	0^{r}
14	(Romania) Irina-Camelia Begu	6	4

==== Ninth qualifier ====
First round
9	(Kazakhstan) Zarina Diyas	6	6
(United States) Shelby Rogers	1	4
(Croatia) Donna Vekić	3	3
15	(Romania) Monica Niculescu	6	6

Qualifying competition
9	(Kazakhstan) Zarina Diyas	6	6
15	(Romania) Monica Niculescu	2	2

==== Tenth qualifier ====
First round
10	(Kazakhstan) Yaroslava Shvedova	6^{2}	2
WC	(United States) Nicole Gibbs	7^{7}	6
(France) Kristina Mladenovic	4	2
21	(Italy) Francesca Schiavone	6	6

Qualifying competition
WC	(United States) Nicole Gibbs	6	4	6
21	(Italy) Francesca Schiavone	3	6	2

==== Eleventh qualifier ====
First round
11	(Croatia) Ajla Tomljanović	0	6	4
(Germany) Julia Görges	6	4	6
(Belgium) Alison Van Uytvanck	7^{7}	6^{4}	2
16	(Belgium) Yanina Wickmayer	6^{5}	7^{7}	6

Qualifying competition
(Germany) Julia Görges	4	6	5
16	(Belgium) Yanina Wickmayer	6	3	7

==== Twelfth qualifier ====
First round
12	(United Kingdom) Heather Watson	6	6
(Czech Republic) Kristýna Plíšková	3	4
(Israel) Shahar Pe'er	4	6	6
24	(New Zealand) Marina Erakovic	6	0	4

Qualifying competition
12	(United Kingdom) Heather Watson	6	6
(Israel) Shahar Pe'er	3	0
