= Feliciano López career statistics =

Spanish tennis player career statistics

Career finals
| Discipline | Type | Won | Lost | Total | WR |
|---|---|---|---|---|---|
| Singles | Grand Slam | – | – | – | – |
| Singles | Summer Olympics | – | – | – | – |
| Singles | ATP Finals | – | – | – | – |
| Singles | ATP Masters 1000 | – | – | – | – |
| Singles | ATP Tour 500 | 3 | 3 | 6 | 0.50 |
| Singles | ATP Tour 250 | 4 | 8 | 12 | 0.33 |
| Total | | 7 | 11 | 18 | 0.39 |
| Doubles | Grand Slam | 1 | 1 | 2 | – |
| Doubles | Summer Olympics | – | – | – | – |
| Doubles | ATP Finals | – | – | – | – |
| Doubles | ATP Masters 1000 | 0 | 2 | 2 | 0.00 |
| Doubles | ATP Tour 500 | 3 | 5 | 8 | 0.38 |
| Doubles | ATP Tour 250 | 2 | 3 | 5 | 0.40 |
| Total | | 6 | 11 | 17 | 0.35 |
| Total | | 13 | 22 | 35 | 0.37 |

This is a list of the main career statistics of professional Spanish tennis player Feliciano López.

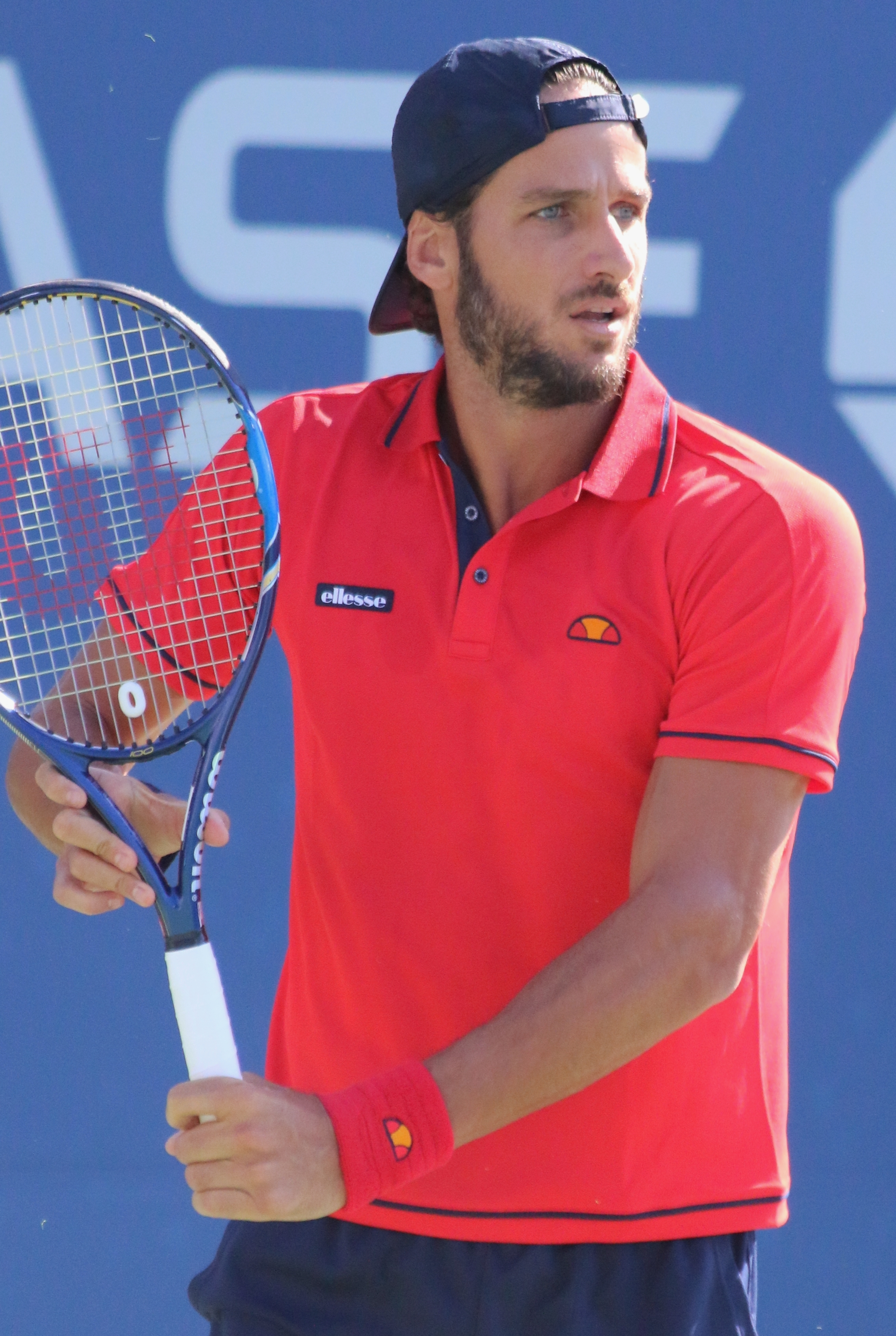
López at the 2016 US open

== Performance timelines ==
Key
| W | F | SF | QF | #R | RR | Q# | P# | DNQ | A | Z# | PO | G | S | B | NMS | NTI | P | NH |

(W) winner; (F) finalist; (SF) semifinalist; (QF) quarterfinalist; (#R) rounds 4, 3, 2, 1; (RR) round-robin stage; (Q#) qualification round; (P#) preliminary round; (DNQ) did not qualify; (A) absent; (Z#) Davis/Fed Cup Zonal Group (with number indication) or (PO) play-off; (G) gold, (S) silver or (B) bronze Olympic/Paralympic medal; (NMS) not a Masters tournament; (NTI) not a Tier I tournament; (P) postponed; (NH) not held; (SR) strike rate (events won / competed); (W–L) win–loss record.
To avoid confusion and double counting, these charts are updated at the conclusion of a tournament or when the player's participation has ended.

=== Singles ===
| Tournament | 1997 | 1998 | 1999 | 2000 | 2001 | 2002 | 2003 | 2004 | 2005 | 2006 | 2007 | 2008 | 2009 | 2010 | 2011 | 2012 | 2013 | 2014 | 2015 | 2016 | 2017 | 2018 | 2019 | 2020 | 2021 | 2022 | 2023 | SR | W–L | Win% |
|---|---|---|---|---|---|---|---|---|---|---|---|---|---|---|---|---|---|---|---|---|---|---|---|---|---|---|---|---|---|---|
Grand Slam tournaments
| Australian Open | A | A | A | A | A | A | 3R | 1R | 3R | 3R | 2R | 2R | 1R | 3R | 2R | 4R | 2R | 3R | 4R | 3R | 1R | 1R | 1R | 1R | 3R | 1R | A | 0 / 20 | 24–20 | 55% |
| French Open | A | A | A | A | 1R | 2R | 1R | 4R | 1R | 1R | 1R | 1R | 2R | 1R | 1R | 1R | 3R | 2R | 1R | 3R | 3R | 1R | 1R | 1R | 1R | Q1 | A | 0 / 21 | 12–21 | 36% |
| Wimbledon | A | A | A | Q2 | A | 4R | 4R | 3R | QF | 1R | 3R | QF | 1R | 3R | QF | 1R | 3R | 4R | 2R | 3R | 1R | 2R | 2R | NH^{*} | 1R | 1R | A | 0 / 20 | 34–20 | 63% |
| US Open | A | A | A | A | A | 2R | 1R | 3R | 2R | 2R | 4R | 1R | 1R | 4R | 3R | 3R | 3R | 3R | QF | 2R | 3R | 1R | 3R | 1R | 1R | A | A | 0 / 20 | 28–20 | 58% |
| Win–loss | 0–0 | 0–0 | 0–0 | 0–0 | 0–1 | 5–3 | 5–4 | 7–4 | 7–4 | 3–4 | 6–4 | 5–4 | 1–4 | 7–4 | 7–4 | 5–4 | 7–4 | 8–4 | 8–4 | 7–4 | 4–4 | 1–4 | 3–4 | 0–3 | 2–4 | 0–2 | 0–0 | 0 / 81 | 98–81 | 55% |
National representation
| Olympics | not held | | | A | not held | | | 3R | not held | | | A | not held | | | 3R | not held | | | A | not held | | | | A | not held | | 0 / 2 | 4–2 | 67% |
| Davis Cup | A | A | A | A | A | A | F | W^{+} | 1R | 1R | QF | W | W | QF | W | A | A | 1R | A | PO | QF | SF | W | RR | | A | A | 5 / 14 | 8–9 | 40% |
ATP Masters 1000
| Indian Wells Masters | A | A | A | A | A | A | 2R | 2R | 3R | 1R | 2R | 2R | 1R | 3R | 1R | 2R | 1R | 4R | QF | 4R | 2R | 4R | 2R | NH^{*} | 1R | Q1 | A | 0 / 18 | 15–18 | 47% |
| Miami Open | A | A | A | A | A | 2R | 1R | 2R | 2R | 2R | 4R | 3R | 3R | 3R | 3R | 2R | A | 3R | 2R | 2R | 2R | 2R | 2R | NH^{*} | 1R | A | A | 0 / 18 | 12–18 | 40% |
| Monte-Carlo Masters | A | A | A | A | A | Q1 | 2R | 2R | 1R | 2R | A | 1R | 1R | 1R | 2R | 1R | A | A | A | 1R | 2R | 2R | Q1 | NH^{*} | A | A | A | 0 / 12 | 6–12 | 33% |
| Madrid Open (Note: Held as Hamburg Masters (outdoor clay) until 2008, Madrid Open (outdoor clay) 2009–present.) | A | A | A | A | A | A | 2R | 1R | 2R | 1R | A | 1R | 1R | 3R | 2R | 1R | 1R | QF | 2R | 2R | 3R | 2R | A | NH^{*} | A | A | A | 0 / 15 | 12–15 | 44% |
| Italian Open | A | A | A | A | A | A | 1R | 1R | 1R | 1R | A | 1R | 2R | QF | 3R | 1R | 1R | 1R | 2R | 1R | 1R | 1R | A | A | A | A | A | 0 / 15 | 6–15 | 29% |
| Canadian Open | A | A | A | A | A | A | QF | 2R | 1R | 1R | Q1 | 2R | 1R | 1R | 2R | A | 1R | SF | 1R | A | 1R | Q1 | 1R | NH^{*} | 2R | A | A | 0 / 14 | 10–14 | 42% |
| Cincinnati Masters | A | A | A | A | A | A | 2R | 2R | 1R | 1R | 1R | 1R | 1R | 1R | 2R | 1R | 3R | 1R | QF | 2R | 2R | Q1 | Q2 | A | A | A | A | 0 / 15 | 10–15 | 40% |
| Shanghai Masters (Note: Held as Madrid Masters (indoor hard) from 2002 to 2008, and Shanghai Masters (outdoor hard) 2009–present.) | A | A | A | A | A | 3R | QF | 2R | 1R | 1R | QF | QF | SF | 1R | SF | 3R | 2R | SF | 3R | 2R | 2R | Q1 | A | NH^{*} | | | A | 0 / 16 | 31–16 | 66% |
| Paris Masters | A | A | A | A | A | Q2 | 2R | QF | 2R | Q1 | 1R | 2R | 1R | 1R | 3R | 1R | 2R | 3R | 2R | 2R | 2R | 2R | Q1 | 2R | A | A | A | 0 / 16 | 14–16 | 46% |
| Win–loss | 0–0 | 0–0 | 0–0 | 0–0 | 0–0 | 3–2 | 11–9 | 7–9 | 3–9 | 2–8 | 7–5 | 6–9 | 6–9 | 6–9 | 14–9 | 2–8 | 4–7 | 15–8 | 10–8 | 6–8 | 6–9 | 5–6 | 2–3 | 1–1 | 0–3 | 0–0 | 0–0 | 0 / 139 | 116–139 | 46% |
Career statistics
| | 1997 | 1998 | 1999 | 2000 | 2001 | 2002 | 2003 | 2004 | 2005 | 2006 | 2007 | 2008 | 2009 | 2010 | 2011 | 2012 | 2013 | 2014 | 2015 | 2016 | 2017 | 2018 | 2019 | 2020 | 2021 | 2022 | 2023 | Career | | |
| Tournaments^{1} | 0 | 1 | 0 | 1 | 5 | 16 | 31 | 26 | 26 | 28 | 24 | 24 | 23 | 24 | 25 | 27 | 21 | 26 | 26 | 25 | 25 | 21 | 16 | 10 | 20 | 11 | 4 | 486 | | |
| Titles | 0 | 0 | 0 | 0 | 0 | 0 | 0 | 1 | 0 | 0 | 0 | 0 | 0 | 1 | 0 | 0 | 1 | 1 | 0 | 1 | 1 | 0 | 1 | 0 | 0 | 0 | 0 | 7 | | |
| Finals | 0 | 0 | 0 | 0 | 0 | 0 | 0 | 2 | 1 | 1 | 0 | 1 | 0 | 1 | 1 | 0 | 2 | 2 | 2 | 2 | 2 | 0 | 1 | 0 | 0 | 0 | 0 | 18 | | |
| Overall win–loss^{2} | 0–0 | 0–1 | 0–0 | 0–1 | 2–5 | 18–16 | 34–31 | 33–27 | 31–28 | 19–29 | 27–25 | 27–26 | 17–24 | 26–24 | 36–26 | 26–27 | 29–20 | 39–26 | 32–26 | 31–24 | 25–23 | 21–21 | 12–15 | 7–10 | 11–20 | 0–11 | 3–4 | 506–490 | | |
| Win % | – | 0% | – | 0% | 29% | 53% | 52% | 55% | 53% | 40% | 52% | 51% | 41% | 52% | 58% | 49% | 59% | 60% | 55% | 56% | 52% | 50% | 44% | 40% | 36% | 0% | 43% | 51% | | |
| Year-end ranking | 570 | 546 | 279 | 271 | 159 | 62 | 28 | 25 | 33 | 79 | 35 | 30 | 47 | 32 | 20 | 40 | 28 | 14 | 17 | 28 | 36 | 64 | 62 | 64 | 106 | 830 | 468 | $18,706,677 | | |

=== Doubles ===
| Tournament | 1997 | 1998 | 1999 | 2000 | 2001 | 2002 | 2003 | 2004 | 2005 | 2006 | 2007 | 2008 | 2009 | 2010 | 2011 | 2012 | 2013 | 2014 | 2015 | 2016 | 2017 | 2018 | 2019 | 2020 | 2021 | 2022 | 2023 | SR | W–L | Win% |
|---|---|---|---|---|---|---|---|---|---|---|---|---|---|---|---|---|---|---|---|---|---|---|---|---|---|---|---|---|---|---|
Grand Slam tournaments
| Australian Open | absent | | | | | | 1R | 2R | 1R | 2R | A | 3R | QF | 2R | 2R | A | 1R | 1R | QF | 2R | 3R | 2R | 1R | 1R | A | A | A | 0 / 16 | 15–16 | 50% |
| French Open | absent | | | | | | 3R | 1R | 1R | 1R | 2R | A | 1R | A | 2R | A | 3R | 3R | 2R | W | 1R | SF | 2R | 3R | A | 3R | A | 1 / 16 | 24–14 | 63% |
| Wimbledon | absent | | | | | | 1R | 2R | 2R | A | A | 3R | A | A | A | A | A | 2R | A | A | 1R | A | 2R | NH^{*} | 1R | 1R | A | 0 / 9 | 6–7 | 55% |
| US Open | absent | | | | | | 3R | QF | 3R | 1R | 2R | QF | A | 1R | A | A | 2R | 1R | 1R | SF | F | 2R | 2R | A | A | 2R | A | 0 / 15 | 23–15 | 61% |
| Win–loss | 0–0 | 0–0 | 0–0 | 0–0 | 0–0 | 0–0 | 3–4 | 5–4 | 3–3 | 1–3 | 2–2 | 6–2 | 3–2 | 1–2 | 2–1 | 0–0 | 3–3 | 3–4 | 4–3 | 11–2 | 7–4 | 6–3 | 3–4 | 2–2 | 0–1 | 3–3 | 0–0 | 1 / 56 | 68–52 | 58% |
Year-end championship
| ATP Finals | did not qualify | | | | | | | | | | | | | | | | | | | RR | did not qualify | | | | | | | 0 / 1 | 1–2 | 33% |
National representation
| Olympics | not held | | | A | not held | | | 1R | not held | | | A | not held | | | 4th | not held | | | A | not held | | | | A | not held | | 0 / 2 | 3–3 | 50% |
| Davis Cup | absent | | | | | | F | W^{+} | 1R | 1R | QF | W | W | QF | W | A | A | 1R | A | PO | QF | SF | W | RR | | A | A | 5 / 14 | 11–14 | 46% |
ATP Masters 1000
| Indian Wells Masters | absent | | | | | | | 2R | 1R | A | 1R | A | 1R | 2R | 1R | 2R | 2R | 1R | 1R | SF | 1R | QF | 1R | NH^{*} | A | QF | A | 0 / 15 | 11–15 | 42% |
| Miami Open | absent | | | | | | | 1R | QF | 1R | A | 1R | A | QF | 1R | 2R | A | QF | 1R | 2R | 1R | 1R | 1R | NH^{*} | A | 2R | A | 0 / 14 | 9–14 | 39% |
| Monte-Carlo Masters | absent | | | | | | | | 1R | A | A | A | 2R | 1R | 1R | A | A | A | A | 1R | F | 1R | 2R | NH^{*} | A | A | A | 0 / 8 | 5–8 | 39% |
| Madrid Open | absent | | | | | | 1R | A | A | 1R | 1R | 2R | 1R | 1R | A | A | A | 1R | SF | 1R | SF | 1R | A | A | NH^{*} | A | A | 0 / 11 | 6–10 | 38% |
| Italian Open | absent | | | | | | | | | | | QF | 1R | 1R | 1R | 1R | A | F | 1R | 1R | 2R | QF | A | A | A | A | A | 0 / 10 | 6–9 | 40% |
| Canadian Open | absent | | | | | | 1R | 1R | 1R | 2R | A | 2R | 2R | 1R | 2R | A | 1R | 1R | 2R | A | 1R | 2R | 2R | NH^{*} | A | A | A | 0 / 14 | 7–14 | 33% |
| Cincinnati Masters | absent | | | | | | | 2R | 2R | 2R | A | 1R | 2R | 2R | 1R | A | 1R | 1R | SF | 1R | 2R | QF | QF | A | A | A | A | 0 / 14 | 12–14 | 46% |
| Shanghai Masters (Note: Held as Madrid Masters (indoor hard) from 2002 to 2008, and Shanghai Masters (outdoor hard) 2009–present.) | not held | | | | | | | | | | | | 2R | A | 1R | 2R | 2R | 1R | QF | QF | 2R | A | A | not held^{*} | | | A | 0 / 8 | 5–7 | 42% |
| Paris Masters | absent | | | | | | 2R | A | A | A | 1R | 1R | A | A | 1R | 2R | A | 1R | 1R | QF | QF | 1R | 1R | A | A | A | A | 0 / 11 | 5–11 | 31% |
| Win–loss | 0–0 | 0–0 | 0–0 | 0–0 | 0–0 | 0–0 | 1–3 | 2–4 | 3–5 | 2–4 | 0–3 | 4–6 | 4–5 | 4–6 | 1–8 | 4–5 | 1–4 | 6–8 | 9–8 | 6–8 | 8–9 | 5–8 | 4–6 | 0–0 | 0–0 | 3–2 | 0–0 | 0 / 105 | 67–102 | 40% |
Career statistics
| | 1997 | 1998 | 1999 | 2000 | 2001 | 2002 | 2003 | 2004 | 2005 | 2006 | 2007 | 2008 | 2009 | 2010 | 2011 | 2012 | 2013 | 2014 | 2015 | 2016 | 2017 | 2018 | 2019 | 2020 | 2021 | 2022 | 2023 | Career | | |
| Tournaments^{1} | 0 | 0 | 2 | 0 | 2 | 3 | 16 | 18 | 17 | 15 | 10 | 17 | 14 | 15 | 15 | 8 | 10 | 18 | 20 | 21 | 21 | 21 | 14 | 4 | 5 | 7 | 1 | 294 | | |
| Titles | 0 | 0 | 0 | 0 | 0 | 0 | 0 | 1 | 0 | 0 | 0 | 0 | 0 | 0 | 0 | 0 | 0 | 0 | 0 | 2 | 0 | 1 | 1 | 0 | 0 | 1 | 0 | 6 | | |
| Finals | 0 | 0 | 0 | 0 | 0 | 0 | 0 | 2 | 1 | 0 | 0 | 0 | 0 | 0 | 1 | 0 | 0 | 2 | 1 | 3 | 3 | 1 | 1 | 0 | 0 | 1 | 0 | 17 | | |
| Overall win–loss^{2} | 0–0 | 0–0 | 0–2 | 0–0 | 3–2 | 1–3 | 7–16 | 22–19 | 14–16 | 8–18 | 6–11 | 19–20 | 12–13 | 9–15 | 7–16 | 7–9 | 5–10 | 15–17 | 22–19 | 28–20 | 19–22 | 21–22 | 17–13 | 5–5 | 2–6 | 11–5 | 0–1 | 260–300 | | |
| Win % | – | – | 0% | – | 60% | 25% | 30% | 54% | 47% | 31% | 35% | 49% | 48% | 38% | 30% | 44% | 33% | 47% | 54% | 58% | 46% | 49% | 57% | 50% | 25% | 69% | 0% | 46% | | |
| Year-end ranking | 597 | 557 | 492 | 407 | 177 | 340 | 89 | 40 | 65 | 129 | 206 | 42 | 78 | 101 | 131 | 178 | 132 | 52 | 35 | 11 | 24 | 32 | 55 | 64 | 125 | 72 | – | | | |

+ Only participate in the 2004 Davis Cup First round.
^{1} Including appearances in Grand Slam, ATP Tour main draw matches, and Summer Olympics.
^{2} Including matches in Grand Slam, ATP Tour events, Summer Olympics, Davis Cup, World Team Cup and ATP Cup.
^{*} not held due to COVID-19 pandemic.

== Grand Slam finals ==
=== Doubles: 2 (1 title, 1 runner-up) ===
| Result | Year | Tournament | Surface | Partner | Opponents | Score |
|---|---|---|---|---|---|---|
| Win | 2016 | French Open | Clay | (Spain) Marc López | (United States) Bob Bryan (United States) Mike Bryan | 6–4, 6–7^{(6–8)}, 6–3 |
| Loss | 2017 | US Open | Hard | (Spain) Marc López | (Netherlands) Jean-Julien Rojer (Romania) Horia Tecău | 4–6, 3–6 |

== Masters 1000 finals ==
=== Doubles: 2 (2 runner-ups) ===
| Result | Year | Tournament | Surface | Partner | Opponents | Score |
|---|---|---|---|---|---|---|
| Loss | 2014 | Italian Open | Clay | (Netherlands) Robin Haase | (Canada) Daniel Nestor (Serbia) Nenad Zimonjić | 4–6, 6–7^{(2–7)} |
| Loss | 2017 | Monte-Carlo Masters | Clay | (Spain) Marc López | (India) Rohan Bopanna (Uruguay) Pablo Cuevas | 3–6, 6–3, [4–10] |

== Olympic medal matches ==
=== Doubles: 1 (1 fourth place) ===
| Result | Year | Tournament | Surface | Partner | Opponents | Score |
|---|---|---|---|---|---|---|
| 4th place | 2012 | Summer Olympics, London | Grass | (Spain) David Ferrer | (France) Julien Benneteau (France) Richard Gasquet | 6–7^{(4–7)}, 2–6 |

== ATP career finals ==
=== Singles: 18 (7 titles, 11 runner-ups) ===
| Legend Grand Slam (0–0) ATP Masters 1000 (0–0) Intl. Gold / ATP 500 Series (3–3) International / ATP 250 Series (4–8) | Finals by surface Hard (2–6) Clay (1–3) Grass (4–2) | Finals by setting Outdoor (6–9) Indoor (1–2) |

| Result | W–L | Date | Tournament | Tier | Surface | Opponent | Score |
|---|---|---|---|---|---|---|---|
| Loss | 0–1 | Mar 2004 | Dubai Tennis Championships, UAE | Intl. Gold | Hard | (Switzerland) Roger Federer | 6–4, 1–6, 2–6 |
| Win | 1–1 | Oct 2004 | Vienna Open, Austria | Intl. Gold | Hard (i) | (Argentina) Guillermo Cañas | 6–4, 1–6, 7–5, 3–6, 7–5 |
| Loss | 1–2 | Aug 2005 | Connecticut Open, US | International | Hard | (United States) James Blake | 6–3, 5–7, 1–6 |
| Loss | 1–3 | Jul 2006 | Swiss Open, Switzerland | International | Clay | (France) Richard Gasquet | 6–7^{(4–7)}, 7–6^{(7–3)}, 3–6, 3–6 |
| Loss | 1–4 | Mar 2008 | Dubai Tennis Championships, UAE | Intl. Gold | Hard | (United States) Andy Roddick | 7–6^{(10–8)}, 4–6, 2–6 |
| Win | 2–4 | Feb 2010 | SA Tennis Open, South Africa | 250 Series | Hard | (France) Stéphane Robert | 7–5, 6–1 |
| Loss | 2–5 | May 2011 | Serbia Open, Serbia | 250 Series | Clay | (Serbia) Novak Djokovic | 6–7^{(4–7)}, 2–6 |
| Loss | 2–6 | Feb 2013 | U.S. National Indoor Tennis Championships, US | 500 Series | Hard (i) | (Japan) Kei Nishikori | 2–6, 3–6 |
| Win | 3–6 | Jun 2013 | Eastbourne International, UK | 250 Series | Grass | (France) Gilles Simon | 7–6^{(7–2)}, 6–7^{(5–7)}, 6–0 |
| Loss | 3–7 | Jun 2014 | Queen's Club Championships, UK | 250 Series | Grass | (Bulgaria) Grigor Dimitrov | 7–6^{(10–8)}, 6–7^{(1–7)}, 6–7^{(6–8)} |
| Win | 4–7 | Jun 2014 | Eastbourne International, UK (2) | 250 Series | Grass | (France) Richard Gasquet | 6–3, 6–7^{(5–7)}, 7–5 |
| Loss | 4–8 | Feb 2015 | Ecuador Open, Ecuador | 250 Series | Clay | (Dominican Republic) Víctor Estrella Burgos | 2–6, 7–6^{(7–5)}, 6–7^{(5–7)} |
| Loss | 4–9 | Oct 2015 | Malaysian Open, Malaysia | 250 Series | Hard (i) | (Spain) David Ferrer | 5–7, 5–7 |
| Win | 5–9 | Jul 2016 | Swiss Open, Switzerland | 250 Series | Clay | (Netherlands) Robin Haase | 6–4, 7–5 |
| Loss | 5–10 | Aug 2016 | Los Cabos Open, Mexico | 250 Series | Hard | (Croatia) Ivo Karlović | 6–7^{(5–7)}, 2–6 |
| Loss | 5–11 | Jun 2017 | Stuttgart Open, Germany | 250 Series | Grass | (France) Lucas Pouille | 6–4, 6–7^{(5–7)}, 4–6 |
| Win | 6–11 | Jun 2017 | Queen's Club Championships, UK | 500 Series | Grass | (Croatia) Marin Čilić | 4–6, 7–6^{(7–2)}, 7–6^{(10–8)} |
| Win | 7–11 | Jun 2019 | Queen's Club Championships, UK (2) | 500 Series | Grass | (France) Gilles Simon | 6–2, 6–7^{(4–7)}, 7–6^{(7–2)} |

=== Doubles: 17 (6 titles, 11 runners-up) ===
| Legend Grand Slam (1–1) ATP Masters 1000 (0–2) Intl. Gold / ATP 500 Series (3–5) International / ATP 250 Series (2–3) | Finals by surface Hard (3–6) Clay (2–5) Grass (1–0) | Finals by setting Outdoor (5–10) Indoor (1–1) |

| Result | W–L | Date | Tournament | Tier | Surface | Partner | Opponents | Score |
|---|---|---|---|---|---|---|---|---|
| Loss | 0–1 | May 2001 | Majorca Open, Spain | International | Clay | (Spain) Francisco Roig | (United States) Donald Johnson (United States) Jared Palmer | 5–7, 3–6 |
| Loss | 0–2 | Apr 2004 | Valencia Open, Spain | International | Clay | (Spain) Marc López | (Argentina) Gastón Etlis (Argentina) Martín Rodríguez | 5–7, 6–7^{(5–7)} |
| Win | 1–2 | Oct 2004 | Stockholm Open, Sweden | International | Hard (i) | (Spain) Fernando Verdasco | (Australia) Wayne Arthurs (Australia) Paul Hanley | 6–4, 6–4 |
| Loss | 1–3 | Apr 2005 | Barcelona Open, Spain | Intl. Gold | Clay | (Spain) Rafael Nadal | (India) Leander Paes (Serbia and Montenegro) Nenad Zimonjić | 3–6, 3–6 |
| Loss | 1–4 | Feb 2011 | Dubai Tennis Championships, UAE | 500 Series | Hard | (France) Jérémy Chardy | (Ukraine) Sergiy Stakhovsky (Russia) Mikhail Youzhny | 6–4, 3–6, [3–10] |
| Loss | 1–5 | Mar 2014 | Mexican Open, Mexico | 500 Series | Hard | (Belarus) Max Mirnyi | (South Africa) Kevin Anderson (Australia) Matthew Ebden | 3–6, 3–6 |
| Loss | 1–6 | May 2014 | Italian Open, Italy | Masters 1000 | Clay | (Netherlands) Robin Haase | (Canada) Daniel Nestor (Serbia) Nenad Zimonjić | 4–6, 6–7^{(2–7)} |
| Loss | 1–7 | Nov 2015 | Valencia Open, Spain | 250 Series | Hard (i) | (Belarus) Max Mirnyi | (United States) Eric Butorac (United States) Scott Lipsky | 6–7^{(4–7)}, 3–6 |
| Win | 2–7 | Jan 2016 | Qatar Open, Qatar | 250 Series | Hard | (Spain) Marc López | (Germany) Philipp Petzschner (Austria) Alexander Peya | 6–4, 6–3 |
| Loss | 2–8 | Feb 2016 | Dubai Tennis Championships, UAE | 500 Series | Hard | (Spain) Marc López | (Italy) Simone Bolelli (Italy) Andreas Seppi | 2–6, 6–3, [12–14] |
| Win | 3–8 | Jun 2016 | French Open, France | Grand Slam | Clay | (Spain) Marc López | (United States) Bob Bryan (United States) Mike Bryan | 6–4, 6–7^{(6–8)}, 6–3 |
| Loss | 3–9 | Mar 2017 | Mexican Open, Mexico | 500 Series | Hard | (United States) John Isner | (United Kingdom) Jamie Murray (Brazil) Bruno Soares | 3–6, 3–6 |
| Loss | 3–10 | Apr 2017 | Monte-Carlo Masters, Monaco | Masters 1000 | Clay | (Spain) Marc López | (India) Rohan Bopanna (Uruguay) Pablo Cuevas | 3–6, 6–3, [4–10] |
| Loss | 3–11 | Sep 2017 | US Open, US | Grand Slam | Hard | (Spain) Marc López | (Netherlands) Jean-Julien Rojer (Romania) Horia Tecău | 4–6, 3–6 |
| Win | 4–11 | Apr 2018 | Barcelona Open, Spain | 500 Series | Clay | (Spain) Marc López | (Pakistan) Aisam-ul-Haq Qureshi (Netherlands) Jean-Julien Rojer | 7–6^{(7–5)}, 6–4 |
| Win | 5–11 | Jun 2019 | Queen's Club Championships, UK | 500 Series | Grass | (United Kingdom) Andy Murray | (United States) Rajeev Ram (United Kingdom) Joe Salisbury | 7–6^{(8–6)}, 5–7, [10–5] |
| Win | 6–11 | Feb 2022 | Mexican Open, Mexico | 500 Series | Hard | (Greece) Stefanos Tsitsipas | (El Salvador) Marcelo Arévalo (Netherlands) Jean-Julien Rojer | 7–5, 6–4 |

== ATP Challenger and ITF Futures finals ==
=== Singles: 7 (4–3) ===
| Legend (singles) ATP Challenger Tour (2–2) ITF Futures Tour (2–1) | Finals by Surface Hard (1–1) Clay (3–2) Grass (0–0) Carpet (0–0) |

| Result | W–L | Date | Tournament | Tier | Surface | Opponent | Score |
|---|---|---|---|---|---|---|---|
| Win | 1–0 | Aug 1999 | Spain F6, Vigo | Futures | Clay | (Spain) Pedro Cánovas García | 6–3, 6–3 |
| Loss | 1–1 | Aug 1999 | Spain F7, Irun | Futures | Clay | (Belgium) Reginald Willems | 4–6, 5–7 |
| Win | 2–1 | Jan 2001 | France F3, Feucherolles | Futures | Clay | (Spain) Mario Muñoz Bejarano | 6–4, 6–0 |
| Loss | 2–2 | Sep 2001 | Maia, Portugal | Challenger | Clay | (Finland) Jarkko Nieminen | 7–5, 3–6, 4–6 |
| Win | 3–2 | Aug 2009 | Segovia, Spain | Challenger | Hard | (France) Adrian Mannarino | 6–3, 6–4 |
| Win | 4–2 | Jul 2011 | Bogotá, Colombia | Challenger | Clay | (Colombia) Carlos Salamanca | 6–4, 6–3 |
| Loss | 4–3 | Nov 2021 | Tenerife, Spain | Challenger | Hard | (Netherlands) Tallon Griekspoor | 4–6, 4–6 |

=== Doubles: 5 (1–4) ===
| Legend (doubles) ATP Challenger Tour (0–2) ITF Futures Tour (1–2) | Finals by Surface Hard (0–0) Clay (1–4) Grass (0–0) Carpet (0–0) |

| Result | W–L | Date | Tournament | Tier | Surface | Partner | Opponents | Score |
|---|---|---|---|---|---|---|---|---|
| Loss | 0–1 | Jul 1998 | Spain F2, Elche | Futures | Clay | (Spain) Juan Carlos Ferrero | (Spain) Sergi Duran (Spain) Javier Pérez Vázquez | 6–7, 3–6 |
| Loss | 0–2 | Sep 1998 | Spain F8, Santander | Futures | Clay | (Spain) Juan Carlos Ferrero | (Sweden) Daniel Pahlsson (Sweden) Robert Samuelsson | 3–6, 6–3, 2–6 |
| Win | 1–2 | Sep 1999 | Spain F8, Santander | Futures | Clay | (Moldova) Joan Jiménez Guerra | (Spain) Juan Gisbert Schultze (Spain) Marcos Roy Girardi | 1–6, 6–3, 7–6 |
| Loss | 1–3 | Jun 2001 | Braunschweig, Germany | Challenger | Clay | (Spain) Francisco Roig | (Germany) Karsten Braasch (Germany) Jens Knippschild | 1–6, 1–6 |
| Loss | 1–4 | Aug 2001 | Geneva, Switzerland | Challenger | Clay | (Spain) Francisco Roig | (Argentina) Diego del Río (Bulgaria) Orlin Stanoytchev | 6–2, 6–7^{(0–7)}, 6–7^{(3–7)} |

== Junior Grand Slam finals ==
=== Doubles: 1 (1 runner-up) ===
| Result | Year | Tournament | Surface | Partner | Opponents | Score |
|---|---|---|---|---|---|---|
| Loss | 1998 | French Open | Clay | (Spain) Juan Carlos Ferrero | (Venezuela) José de Armas (Chile) Fernando González | 7–6, 5–7, 3–6 |

== Top 10 wins ==
- López has a 39–97 record against players who were, at the time the match was played, ranked in the top 10.

| Season | 2002 | 2003 | 2004 | 2005 | 2006 | 2007 | 2008 | 2009 | 2010 | 2011 | 2012 | 2013 | 2014 | 2015 | 2016 | 2017 | 2018 | ... | 2021 | Total |
|---|---|---|---|---|---|---|---|---|---|---|---|---|---|---|---|---|---|---|---|---|
| Wins | 1 | 5 | 1 | 2 | 2 | 2 | 5 | 0 | 1 | 4 | 1 | 1 | 4 | 4 | 1 | 2 | 2 | | 1 | 39 |

| # | Player | Rank | Event | Surface | Rd | Score |
2002
| 1. | (Russia) Marat Safin | 4 | Hong Kong, China | Hard | 2R | 7–6^{(7–2)}, 7–5 |
2003
| 2. | (Thailand) Paradorn Srichaphan | 9 | Hamburg, Germany | Clay | 1R | 6–4, 6–3 |
| 3. | (Germany) Rainer Schüttler | 8 | Stuttgart, Germany | Clay | QF | 6–2, 6–4 |
| 4. | (Argentina) Guillermo Coria | 6 | Montreal, Canada | Hard | 1R | 6–3, ret. |
| 5. | (Thailand) Paradorn Srichaphan | 10 | Cincinnati, United States | Hard | 1R | 6–7^{(1–7)}, 6–4, 7–6^{(7–5)} |
| 6. | (Spain) Carlos Moyá | 7 | Madrid, Spain | Hard (i) | 3R | 6–7^{(5–7)}, 6–1, 7–5 |
2004
| 7. | (Argentina) Gastón Gaudio | 10 | Paris, France | Carpet (i) | 2R | 7–5, 3–6, 6–1 |
2005
| 8. | (United States) Andre Agassi | 7 | Hamburg, Germany | Clay | 1R | 6–2, 7–6^{(7–5)} |
| 9. | (Russia) Marat Safin | 5 | Wimbledon, London, England | Grass | 3R | 6–4, 7–6^{(7–4)}, 6–3 |
2006
| 10. | (Croatia) Ivan Ljubičić | 4 | Gstaad, Switzerland | Clay | QF | 7–6^{(7–4)}, 6–3 |
| 11. | (Croatia) Ivan Ljubičić | 3 | US Open, New York, United States | Hard | 1R | 6–3, 6–3, 6–3 |
2007
| 12. | (Czech Republic) Tomáš Berdych | 10 | Stuttgart, Germany | Clay | 2R | 6–0, 6–3 |
| 13. | (Spain) David Ferrer | 7 | Madrid, Spain | Hard (i) | 2R | 7–6^{(7–3)}, 7–5 |
2008
| 14. | (Czech Republic) Tomáš Berdych | 10 | Dubai, United Arab Emirates | Hard | 2R | 6–2, 7–5 |
| 15. | (Spain) David Ferrer | 4 | Dubai, United Arab Emirates | Hard | QF | 6–4, 6–3 |
| 16. | (Russia) Nikolay Davydenko | 5 | Dubai, United Arab Emirates | Hard | SF | 6–4, 4–6, 7–5 |
| 17. | (Spain) David Ferrer | 5 | Madrid, Spain | Hard (i) | 2R | 6–4, 7–6^{(7–4)} |
| 18. | (Argentina) Juan Martín del Potro | 9 | Davis Cup, Mar del Plata, Argentina | Hard (i) | RR | 4–6, 7–6^{(7–2)}, 7–6^{(7–4)}, 6–3 |
2010
| 19. | (Spain) Rafael Nadal | 1 | Queen's Club, London, England | Grass | QF | 7–6^{(7–5)}, 6–4 |
2011
| 20. | (United States) Andy Roddick | 10 | Wimbledon, London, England | Grass | 3R | 7–6^{(7–2)}, 7–6^{(7–2)}, 6–4 |
| 21. | (United States) Mardy Fish | 8 | Davis Cup, Austin, United States | Hard (i) | RR | 6–4, 3–6, 6–3, 6–7^{(2–7)}, 8–6 |
| 22. | (Czech Republic) Tomáš Berdych | 7 | Shanghai, China | Hard | 3R | 6–4, 6–4 |
| 23. | (France) Gaël Monfils | 10 | Paris, France | Hard (i) | 2R | 6–3, 6–4 |
2012
| 24. | (Argentina) Juan Mónaco | 10 | Summer Olympics, London, UK | Grass | 2R | 6–4, 6–4 |
2013
| 25. | (Switzerland) Stan Wawrinka | 10 | Gstaad, Switzerland | Clay | QF | 6–4, 2–6, 4–3 ret. |
2014
| 26. | (Czech Republic) Tomáš Berdych | 6 | Queen's Club, London, England | Grass | QF | 6–4, 7–6^{(9–7)} |
| 27. | (Czech Republic) Tomáš Berdych | 5 | Toronto, Canada | Hard | 3R | 3–6, 6–3, 6–4 |
| 28. | (Canada) Milos Raonic | 6 | Toronto, Canada | Hard | QF | 6–4, 6–7^{(5–7)}, 6–3 |
| 29. | (Spain) Rafael Nadal | 2 | Shanghai, China | Hard | 2R | 6–3, 7–6^{(8–6)} |
2015
| 30. | (Japan) Kei Nishikori | 5 | Indian Wells, United States | Hard | 4R | 6–4, 7–6^{(7–2)} |
| 31. | (Canada) Milos Raonic | 10 | Cincinnati, United States | Hard | 1R | 7–6^{(7–4)}, 6–4 |
| 32. | (Spain) Rafael Nadal | 8 | Cincinnati, United States | Hard | 3R | 5–7, 6–4, 7–6^{(7–3)} |
| 33. | (Canada) Milos Raonic | 10 | US Open, New York, United States | Hard | 3R | 6–2, 7–6^{(7–4)}, 6–3 |
2016
| 34. | (Serbia) Novak Djokovic | 1 | Dubai, United Arab Emirates | Hard | QF | 6–3, 0–0, ret. |
2017
| 35. | (Switzerland) Stan Wawrinka | 3 | Queen's Club, London, England | Grass | 1R | 7–6^{(7–4)}, 7–5 |
| 36. | (Croatia) Marin Čilić | 7 | Queen's Club, London, England | Grass | F | 4–6, 7–6^{(7–2)}, 7–6^{(10–8)} |
2018
| 37. | (United States) Jack Sock | 10 | Indian Wells, United States | Hard | 3R | 7–6^{(8–6)}, 4–6, 6–4 |
| 38. | (Belgium) David Goffin | 9 | Queen's Club, London, England | Grass | 1R | 6–3, 6–7^{(7–9)}, 6–3 |
2021
| 39. | (Russia) Andrey Rublev | 5 | Davis Cup, Madrid, Spain | Hard (i) | RR | 2–6, 6–3, 6–4 |

* Statistics correct As of 28 November 2021.

== ATP Tour career earnings ==
| Year | Majors | ATP wins | Total wins | Earnings ($) | Money list rank |
|---|---|---|---|---|---|
| 1997 | 0 | 0 | 0 | 1,410 | n/a |
| 1998 | 0 | 0 | 0 | 5,542 | n/a |
| 1999 | 0 | 0 | 0 | 10,898 | n/a |
| 2000 | 0 | 0 | 0 | 26,662 | n/a |
| 2001 | 0 | 0 | 0 | 75,916 | n/a |
| 2002 | 0 | 0 | 0 | 238,659 | 91 |
| 2003 | 0 | 0 | 0 | 617,058 | 31 |
| 2004 | 0 | 2 | 2 | 748,662 | 20 |
| 2005 | 0 | 0 | 0 | 630,354 | 31 |
| 2006 | 0 | 0 | 0 | 401,937 | 64 |
| 2007 | 0 | 0 | 0 | 458,795 | 49 |
| 2008 | 0 | 0 | 0 | 865,779 | 21 |
| 2009 | 0 | 0 | 0 | 563,053 | 49 |
| 2010 | 0 | 1 | 1 | 721,518 | 34 |
| 2011 | 0 | 0 | 0 | 1,012,966 | 25 |
| 2012 | 0 | 0 | 0 | 723,420 | 34 |
| 2013 | 0 | 1 | 1 | 363,586 | 44 |
| 2014 | 0 | 1 | 1 | 1,669,872 | 14 |
| 2015 | 0 | 0 | 0 | 1,542,757 | n/a |
| 2016 | 1 | 3 | 3 | 1,706,435 | n/a |
| 2017 | 0 | 1 | 1 | 1,679,142 | n/a |
| 2018 | 0 | 1 | 1 | 1,190,793 | n/a |
| 2019 | 0 | 2 | 2 | 1,283,705 | 41 |
| 2020 | 0 | 0 | 0 | 488,697 | 68 |
| 2021 | 0 | 0 | 0 | 619,145 | 80 |
| 2022 | 0 | 0 | 0 | $395,870 | 145 |
| 2023 | 0 | 0 | 0 | $88,453 | 350 |
| Career* | 1 | 12 | 12 | $18,706,677 | 42 |

== Records ==
- These records were attained in the Open Era.
- Records in **bold** indicate peerless achievements.
- Records in italics are currently active streaks.

| Time span | Record accomplished | # | Players matched |
|---|---|---|---|
| 2002 French Open – 2022 Australian Open | Most consecutive Grand Slam main draw appearances | 79 | **Stands alone** |
| 2001 French Open – 2022 Wimbledon | Most main draw appearances at each Grand Slam | 20 | **Stands alone** |
| 1998 Barcelona Open – 2023 Barcelona Open | Most ATP 500 main draw appearances at single tournament | 22 | **Stands alone** |
| 2002–2021 | Most Masters series main draw appearances | 139 | Novak Djokovic |
| 1998–2023 | Most ATP 500 main draw appearances | 97 | **Stands alone** |
| 2002–2023 | Most Hard surface main draw appearances | 279 | **Stands alone** |
| 1998–2023 | Most Outdoor main draw appearances | 394 | **Stands alone** |
| 1998–2023 | Most ATP main draw appearances | 486 | **Stands alone** |
| 1998–2023 | Most ATP main draw losses | 490 | **Stands alone** |

== See also ==
- List of Grand Slam men's doubles champions
- ATP Tour records
- Spain Davis Cup team
- List of Spain Davis Cup team representatives
- Fastest recorded tennis serves
- Sport in Spain
