= 2015 Italian Open – Women's doubles =

Women's doubles
- 2015 Italian Open

Final
- Champions: (Hungary) Tímea Babos (France) Kristina Mladenovic
- Runners-up: (Switzerland) Martina Hingis (India) Sania Mirza
- Score: 6–4, 6–3

Details
- Draw: 28
- Seeds: 8

Events
Singles	men	women
Doubles	men	women
← 2014 ·	Italian Open	· 2016 →

Květa Peschke and Katarina Srebotnik were the defending champions, but Peschke chose not to participate. Srebotnik played alongside Caroline Garcia, but lost in the semifinals to Martina Hingis and Sania Mirza.
Tímea Babos and Kristina Mladenovic won the title, defeating Hingis and Mirza in the final, 6–4, 6–3.

== Seeds ==
The top four seeds receive a bye into the second round.

1. (Switzerland) Martina Hingis / (India) Sania Mirza (final)
2. (Chinese Taipei) Hsieh Su-wei / (Italy) Flavia Pennetta (quarterfinals)
3. (Hungary) Tímea Babos / (France) Kristina Mladenovic (champions)
4. (France) Caroline Garcia / (Slovenia) Katarina Srebotnik (semifinals)
5. (United States) Bethanie Mattek-Sands / (Czech Republic) Lucie Šafářová (quarterfinals, withdrew)
6. (Czech Republic) Andrea Hlaváčková / (Czech Republic) Lucie Hradecká (second round)
7. (Chinese Taipei) Chan Yung-jan / (China) Zheng Jie (first round)
8. (Russia) Alla Kudryavtseva / (Russia) Anastasia Pavlyuchenkova (semifinals)

== Draw ==
=== Key ===
- Q = Qualifier
- WC = Wild card
- LL = Lucky loser
- Alt = Alternate
- ITF = ITF entry
- PR = Protected ranking
- SR = Special ranking
- SE = Special exempt
- JE = Junior exempt
- JR = Junior Accelerator Programme entrant
- CO = College Accelerator Programme entrant
- NG = Next Gen Accelerator Program entrant
- w/o = Walkover
- r = Retired
- d = Defaulted

=== Finals ===
Semifinals
1	(Switzerland) Martina Hingis (India) Sania Mirza	6	7^{7}
4	(France) Caroline Garcia (Slovenia) Katarina Srebotnik	2	6^{5}
3	(Hungary) Tímea Babos (France) Kristina Mladenovic	6	6
8	(Russia) Alla Kudryavtseva (Russia) Anastasia Pavlyuchenkova	2	3

Final
1	(Switzerland) Martina Hingis (India) Sania Mirza	4	3
3	(Hungary) Tímea Babos (France) Kristina Mladenovic	6	6

=== Top half ===
First round
(China) C Liang (Hungary) K Marosi	4	2
(Romania) I-C Begu (Romania) M Niculescu	6	6
(United States) R Kops-Jones (Romania) R Olaru	2	1
(Germany) J Görges (Spain) S Soler Espinosa	6	6
(Germany) A-L Grönefeld (Russia) A Panova	3	7^{7}	[10]
7	(Chinese Taipei) Y-j Chan (China) J Zheng	6	6^{0}	[7]
(Germany) S Lisicki (Russia) E Vesnina	4	4
(Australia) C Dellacqua (Kazakhstan) Y Shvedova	6	6
(Netherlands) M Krajicek (Czech Republic) B Strýcová	3	0
(Canada) G Dabrowski (Poland) A Rosolska	6	6
(Italy) K Knapp (Italy) R Vinci	3	4
6	(Czech Republic) A Hlaváčková (Czech Republic) L Hradecká	6	6

Second round
1	(Switzerland) M Hingis (India) S Mirza	6	6
(Romania) I-C Begu (Romania) M Niculescu	4	1
(Germany) J Görges (Spain) S Soler Espinosa	6	7^{7}
(Germany) A-L Grönefeld (Russia) A Panova	4	6^{1}
4	(France) C Garcia (Slovenia) K Srebotnik	7^{8}	1	[10]
(Australia) C Dellacqua (Kazakhstan) Y Shvedova	6^{6}	6	[7]
(Canada) G Dabrowski (Poland) A Rosolska	6	4	[11]
6	(Czech Republic) A Hlaváčková (Czech Republic) L Hradecká	4	6	[9]

Quarterfinals
1	(Switzerland) M Hingis (India) S Mirza	6	6
(Germany) J Görges (Spain) S Soler Espinosa	4	3
4	(France) C Garcia (Slovenia) K Srebotnik	6	6
(Canada) G Dabrowski (Poland) A Rosolska	3	3

Semifinals
1	(Switzerland) M Hingis (India) S Mirza	6	7^{7}
4	(France) C Garcia (Slovenia) K Srebotnik	2	6^{5}

=== Bottom half ===
First round
5	(United States) B Mattek-Sands (Czech Republic) L Šafářová	6	6
(Poland) K Jans-Ignacik (Slovenia) A Klepač	4	3
WC	(Italy) ME Camerin (Italy) C Dentoni	0	4
WC	(Slovakia) D Hantuchová (Australia) S Stosur	6	6
(Russia) V Dushevina (Spain) MJ Martínez Sánchez	6	6
(Chinese Taipei) H-c Chan (Spain) A Medina Garrigues	2	3
8	(Russia) A Kudryavtseva (Russia) A Pavlyuchenkova	6	6
WC	(Italy) N Burnett (Italy) J Paolini	1	0
WC	(Romania) S Halep (Italy) F Schiavone	6	6
(Croatia) D Jurak (Spain) A Parra Santonja	2	2
(Australia) An Rodionova (Australia) Ar Rodionova	7^{7}	6^{4}	[8]
(Japan) S Aoyama (Czech Republic) R Voráčová	6^{0}	7^{7}	[10]

Second round
5	(United States) B Mattek-Sands (Czech Republic) L Šafářová	6	7^{7}
WC	(Slovakia) D Hantuchová (Australia) S Stosur	3	6^{1}
(Russia) V Dushevina (Spain) MJ Martínez Sánchez	1	2
3	(Hungary) T Babos (France) K Mladenovic	6	6
8	(Russia) A Kudryavtseva (Russia) A Pavlyuchenkova	6	6
WC	(Romania) S Halep (Italy) F Schiavone	4	4
(Japan) S Aoyama (Czech Republic) R Voráčová	5	6	[2]
2	(Chinese Taipei) S-w Hsieh (Italy) F Pennetta	7	2	[10]

Quarterfinals
5	(United States) B Mattek-Sands (Czech Republic) L Šafářová
3	(Hungary) T Babos (France) K Mladenovic	w/o
8	(Russia) A Kudryavtseva (Russia) A Pavlyuchenkova	4	6	[10]
2	(Chinese Taipei) S-w Hsieh (Italy) F Pennetta	6	4	[5]

Semifinals
3	(Hungary) T Babos (France) K Mladenovic	6	6
8	(Russia) A Kudryavtseva (Russia) A Pavlyuchenkova	2	3
