= 2015 Italian Open – Women's singles =

Women's singles
- 2015 Italian Open

Final
- Champion: (Russia) Maria Sharapova
- Runner-up: (Spain) Carla Suárez Navarro
- Score: 4–6, 7–5, 6–1

Details
- Draw: 56
- Seeds: 16

Events
Singles	men	women
Doubles	men	women
← 2014 ·	Italian Open	· 2016 →

Maria Sharapova defeated Carla Suárez Navarro in the final, 4–6, 7–5, 6–1 to win the women's singles tennis title at the 2015 Italian Open. It was her third Italian Open title.

Serena Williams was the two-time defending champion, but withdrew before her third-round match because of a right elbow injury.

== Seeds ==
The top eight seeds received a bye into the second round.

1. (United States) Serena Williams (third round, withdrew because of a right elbow injury)
2. (Romania) Simona Halep (semifinals)
3. (Russia) Maria Sharapova (champion)
4. (Czech Republic) Petra Kvitová (quarterfinals)
5. (Denmark) Caroline Wozniacki (second round)
6. (Canada) Eugenie Bouchard (third round)
7. (Serbia) Ana Ivanovic (second round)
8. (Russia) Ekaterina Makarova (third round)
9. (Germany) Angelique Kerber (second round)
10. (Spain) Carla Suárez Navarro (final)
11. (Czech Republic) Karolína Plíšková (first round)
12. (Czech Republic) Lucie Šafářová (second round)
13. (Italy) Sara Errani (second round)
14. (United States) Venus Williams (third round)
15. (United States) Madison Keys (second round)
16. (Serbia) Jelena Janković (third round)

Click on the seed number of a player to go to their draw section.

== Draw ==
=== Key ===
- Q = Qualifier
- WC = Wild card
- LL = Lucky loser
- Alt = Alternate
- ITF = ITF entry
- PR = Protected ranking
- SR = Special ranking
- SE = Special exempt
- JE = Junior exempt
- JR = Junior Accelerator Programme entrant
- CO = College Accelerator Programme entrant
- NG = Next Gen Accelerator Program entrant
- w/o = Walkover
- r = Retired
- d = Defaulted

=== Finals ===
Quarterfinals
Q	(United States) Christina McHale	2	4
Q	(Russia) Daria Gavrilova	6	6
3	(Russia) Maria Sharapova	6	6
(Belarus) Victoria Azarenka	3	2
10	(Spain) Carla Suárez Navarro	6	6
4	(Czech Republic) Petra Kvitová	3	2
Q	(Romania) Alexandra Dulgheru	1	0
2	(Romania) Simona Halep	6	6

Semifinals
Q	(Russia) Daria Gavrilova	5	3
3	(Russia) Maria Sharapova	7	6
10	(Spain) Carla Suárez Navarro	2	6	7
2	(Romania) Simona Halep	6	3	5

Final
3	(Russia) Maria Sharapova	4	7	6
10	(Spain) Carla Suárez Navarro	6	5	1

=== Top half ===
==== Section 1 ====
First round
(Russia) A Pavlyuchenkova	6	7
(Australia) S Stosur	4	5
(Czech Republic) B Strýcová	6^{5}	1
Q	(United States) C McHale	7^{7}	6
(Slovakia) D Hantuchová	4	6^{4}
13	(Italy) S Errani	6	7^{7}
11	(Czech Republic) Ka Plíšková	4	0
(Switzerland) T Bacsinszky	6	6
(United States) S Stephens	4	1
(Germany) S Lisicki	6	6
Q	(Russia) D Gavrilova	6^{2}	7	6
(Switzerland) B Bencic	7^{7}	5	2

Second round
1	(United States) S Williams	6	6
(Russia) A Pavlyuchenkova	1	3
Q	(United States) C McHale	6	6
13	(Italy) S Errani	4	4
(Switzerland) T Bacsinszky	6	6
(Germany) S Lisicki	4	3
Q	(Russia) D Gavrilova	5	7^{7}	7^{9}
7	(Serbia) A Ivanovic	7	6^{2}	6^{7}

Third round
1	(United States) S Williams
Q	(United States) C McHale	w/o
(Switzerland) T Bacsinszky	4	6^{0}
Q	(Russia) D Gavrilova	6	7^{7}

Quarterfinals
Q	(United States) C McHale	2	4
Q	(Russia) D Gavrilova	6	6

==== Section 2 ====
First round
(Australia) J Gajdošová	1	6	7^{16}
Q	(Russia) E Vesnina	6	2	6^{14}
Q	(Serbia) B Jovanovski	7^{7}	4	6
(France) C Garcia	6^{4}	6	2
(United States) M Brengle	2	4
15	(United States) M Keys	6	6
9	(Germany) A Kerber	6	6
(France) A Cornet	2	3
(Romania) I-C Begu	4	6	6
Q	(Poland) U Radwańska	6	2	1
(Belarus) V Azarenka	7	2	6
LL	(Czech Republic) L Hradecká	5	6	1

Second round
3	(Russia) M Sharapova	6	3
(Australia) J Gajdošová	2	1^{r}
Q	(Serbia) B Jovanovski	6	1	6
15	(United States) M Keys	4	6	3
9	(Germany) A Kerber	3	3
(Romania) I-C Begu	6	6
(Belarus) V Azarenka	6	7^{7}
5	(Denmark) C Wozniacki	2	6^{2}

Third round
3	(Russia) M Sharapova	6	6
Q	(Serbia) B Jovanovski	3	3
(Romania) I-C Begu	4	7	1
(Belarus) V Azarenka	6	5	6

Quarterfinals
3	(Russia) M Sharapova	6	6
(Belarus) V Azarenka	3	2

=== Bottom half ===
==== Section 3 ====
First round
(Bulgaria) T Pironkova	5	1
(Kazakhstan) Z Diyas	7	6
(Italy) R Vinci	3	1
(United Kingdom) H Watson	6	6
(Germany) M Barthel	4	6	3
10	(Spain) C Suárez Navarro	6	2	6
16	(Serbia) J Janković	7	7
(Italy) C Giorgi	5	5
WC	(Italy) N Burnett	3	6^{5}
(Slovakia) M Rybáriková	6	7^{7}
WC	(Italy) K Knapp	6	6
WC	(Italy) F Schiavone	4	1

Second round
6	(Canada) E Bouchard	6	6
(Kazakhstan) Z Diyas	3	4
(United Kingdom) H Watson	1	1
10	(Spain) C Suárez Navarro	6	6
16	(Serbia) J Janković	6	7^{7}
(Slovakia) M Rybáriková	4	6^{2}
WC	(Italy) K Knapp	3	6	6^{1}
4	(Czech Republic) P Kvitová	6	4	7^{7}

Third round
6	(Canada) E Bouchard	7^{7}	5	6^{7}
10	(Spain) C Suárez Navarro	6^{2}	7	7^{9}
16	(Serbia) J Janković	3	2
4	(Czech Republic) P Kvitová	6	6

Quarterfinals
10	(Spain) C Suárez Navarro	6	6
4	(Czech Republic) P Kvitová	3	2

==== Section 4 ====
First round
LL	(France) K Mladenovic	7	6
(Puerto Rico) M Puig	5	2
Q	(Romania) A Dulgheru	6^{2}	6	6
Q	(Japan) M Doi	7^{7}	3	3
LL	(Slovakia) AK Schmiedlová	6^{6}	7^{7}	4
12	(Czech Republic) L Šafářová	7^{8}	6^{3}	6
14	(United States) V Williams	6	6
Q	(Czech Republic) K Siniaková	2	2
(Ukraine) E Svitolina	6	6
(Italy) F Pennetta	4	2
(United States) A Riske	6	6
(United States) V Lepchenko	4	3

Second round
8	(Russia) E Makarova	4	6	6
LL	(France) K Mladenovic	6	3	1
Q	(Romania) A Dulgheru	1	6	7^{8}
12	(Czech Republic) L Šafářová	6	4	6^{6}
14	(United States) V Williams	6	6
(Ukraine) E Svitolina	4	3
(United States) A Riske	3	0
2	(Romania) S Halep	6	6

Third round
8	(Russia) E Makarova	4	3
Q	(Romania) A Dulgheru	6	6
14	(United States) V Williams	2	1
2	(Romania) S Halep	6	6

Quarterfinals
Q	(Romania) A Dulgheru	1	0
2	(Romania) S Halep	6	6

== Qualifying ==
=== Seeds ===
1. (Slovakia) Anna Karolína Schmiedlová (qualifying competition, lucky loser)
2. (France) Kristina Mladenovic (qualifying competition, lucky loser)
3. (Japan) Kurumi Nara (first round)
4. (Czech Republic) Lucie Hradecká (qualifying competition, lucky loser)
5. (Ukraine) Lesia Tsurenko (qualifying competition)
6. (United States) Lauren Davis (qualifying competition)
7. (Croatia) Ajla Tomljanović (qualifying competition)
8. (Romania) Monica Niculescu (qualifying competition)
9. (United States) Christina McHale (qualified)
10. (Croatia) Mirjana Lučić-Baroni (first round)
11. (Czech Republic) Kateřina Siniaková (qualified)
12. (Serbia) Bojana Jovanovski (qualified)
13. (Germany) Julia Görges (first round)
14. (Spain) Sílvia Soler Espinosa (qualifying competition)
15. (Romania) Alexandra Dulgheru (qualified)
16. (Slovenia) Polona Hercog (first round)

=== Qualifiers ===
1. (Russia) Elena Vesnina
2. (Czech Republic) Kateřina Siniaková
3. (Russia) Daria Gavrilova
4. (Poland) Urszula Radwańska
5. (Romania) Alexandra Dulgheru
6. (United States) Christina McHale
7. (Japan) Misaki Doi
8. (Serbia) Bojana Jovanovski

=== Lucky losers ===
1. (Slovakia) Anna Karolína Schmiedlová
2. (France) Kristina Mladenovic
3. (Czech Republic) Lucie Hradecká

=== Qualifying draw ===
==== First qualifier ====
First round
1	(Slovakia) Anna Karolína Schmiedlová	4	6	6
(Czech Republic) Klára Koukalová	6	2	4
(Russia) Elena Vesnina	6	6
13	(Germany) Julia Görges	2	3

Qualifying competition
1	(Slovakia) Anna Karolína Schmiedlová	6	2	5
(Russia) Elena Vesnina	4	6	7

==== Second qualifier ====
First round
2	(France) Kristina Mladenovic	6	6
(United States) Irina Falconi	3	2
(United States) Shelby Rogers	5	1
11	(Czech Republic) Kateřina Siniaková	7	6

Qualifying competition
2	(France) Kristina Mladenovic	6	2	6^{5}
11	(Czech Republic) Kateřina Siniaková	4	6	7^{7}

==== Third qualifier ====
First round
3	(Japan) Kurumi Nara	2	2
(Russia) Daria Gavrilova	6	6
(Hungary) Tímea Babos	2	4
14	(Spain) Sílvia Soler Espinosa	6	6

Qualifying competition
(Russia) Daria Gavrilova	1	6	6
14	(Spain) Sílvia Soler Espinosa	6	4	3

==== Fourth qualifier ====
First round
4	(Czech Republic) Lucie Hradecká	7	6
WC	(Italy) Corinna Dentoni	5	2
(Poland) Urszula Radwańska	6	6
10	(Croatia) Mirjana Lučić-Baroni	2	3

Qualifying competition
4	(Czech Republic) Lucie Hradecká	3	4
(Poland) Urszula Radwańska	6	6

==== Fifth qualifier ====
First round
5	(Ukraine) Lesia Tsurenko	7^{7}	4	6
(China) Zhang Shuai	6^{2}	6	2
WC	(Switzerland) Lisa Sabino	3	1
15	(Romania) Alexandra Dulgheru	6	6

Qualifying competition
5	(Ukraine) Lesia Tsurenko	2	6	3
15	(Romania) Alexandra Dulgheru	6	4	6

==== Sixth qualifier ====
First round
6	(United States) Lauren Davis	6	3	6
(United States) Nicole Gibbs	3	6	2
(New Zealand) Marina Erakovic	2	4
9	(United States) Christina McHale	6	6

Qualifying competition
6	(United States) Lauren Davis	7	1	4
9	(United States) Christina McHale	5	6	6

==== Seventh qualifier ====
First round
7	(Croatia) Ajla Tomljanović	6	7
WC	(Italy) Gioia Barbieri	2	5
(Japan) Misaki Doi	6^{2}	6	6
16	(Slovenia) Polona Hercog	7^{7}	4	4

Qualifying competition
7	(Croatia) Ajla Tomljanović	3	4
(Japan) Misaki Doi	6	6

==== Eighth qualifier ====
First round
8	(Romania) Monica Niculescu	7^{7}	2	6
WC	(Italy) Jasmine Paolini	6^{1}	6	0
(Russia) Alla Kudryavtseva	6	1	6^{4}
12	(Serbia) Bojana Jovanovski	3	6	7^{7}

Qualifying competition
8	(Romania) Monica Niculescu	4	7	4
12	(Serbia) Bojana Jovanovski	6	5	6
