= 2014 Italian Open – Women's singles =

Italian tennis tournament

Women's singles
- 2014 Italian Open

Final
- Champion: (United States) Serena Williams
- Runner-up: (Italy) Sara Errani
- Score: 6–3, 6–0

Details
- Draw: 56
- Seeds: 16

Events
Singles	men	women
Doubles	men	women
← 2013 ·	Italian Open	· 2015 →

Defending champion Serena Williams defeated Sara Errani in the final, 6–3, 6–0 to win the women's singles tennis title at the 2014 Italian Open.

Maria Sharapova's loss in the third round ended her 16-match winning streak in the tournament dating back to 2008. The streak includes two Italian Open titles. She would go on to win her third and last title in Rome in following year.

== Seeds ==
The top eight seeds receive a bye into the second round.

1. (United States) Serena Williams (champion)
2. (China) Li Na (quarterfinals)
3. (Poland) Agnieszka Radwańska (quarterfinals)
4. (Romania) Simona Halep (third round, withdrew because of an abdominal injury)
5. (Czech Republic) Petra Kvitová (second round)
6. (Serbia) Jelena Janković (semifinals)
7. (Germany) Angelique Kerber (second round)
8. (Russia) Maria Sharapova (third round)
9. (Slovakia) Dominika Cibulková (first round)
10. (Italy) Sara Errani (final)
11. (Serbia) Ana Ivanovic (semifinals)
12. (Italy) Flavia Pennetta (third round)
13. (Spain) Carla Suárez Navarro (quarterfinals)
14. (Denmark) Caroline Wozniacki (withdrew because of a knee injury)
15. (Germany) Sabine Lisicki (first round)
16. (United States) Sloane Stephens (second round)
17. (Canada) Eugenie Bouchard (first round)

Click on the seed number of a player to go to their draw section.

== Draw ==
=== Key ===
- Q = Qualifier
- WC = Wild card
- LL = Lucky loser
- Alt = Alternate
- ITF = ITF entry
- PR = Protected ranking
- SR = Special ranking
- SE = Special exempt
- JE = Junior exempt
- JR = Junior Accelerator Programme entrant
- CO = College Accelerator Programme entrant
- NG = Next Gen Accelerator Program entrant
- w/o = Walkover
- r = Retired
- d = Defaulted

=== Finals ===
Quarterfinals
1	(United States) Serena Williams	6	6
(China) Zhang Shuai	1	3
13	(Spain) Carla Suárez Navarro	4	6	4
11	(Serbia) Ana Ivanovic	6	3	6
6	(Serbia) Jelena Janković	6	6
3	(Poland) Agnieszka Radwańska	4	4
10	(Italy) Sara Errani	6	4	6
2	(China) Li Na	3	6	2

Semifinals
1	(United States) Serena Williams	6	3	6
11	(Serbia) Ana Ivanovic	1	6	1
6	(Serbia) Jelena Janković	3	5
10	(Italy) Sara Errani	6	7

Final
1	(United States) Serena Williams	6	6
10	(Italy) Sara Errani	3	0

=== Top half ===
==== Section 1 ====
First round
PR	(Switzerland) R Oprandi	3	0
(Germany) A Petkovic	6	6
(China) S Peng	1	0
(United States) V Lepchenko	6	6
(Serbia) B Jovanovski	6	3	3
16	(United States) S Stephens	3	6	6
9	(Slovakia) D Cibulková	4	6^{2}
WC	(Italy) C Giorgi	6	7^{7}
Q	(United States) C McHale	6	4	6
(Romania) S Cîrstea	3	6	1
Q	(United States) L Davis	4	0
(China) S Zhang	6	6

Second round
1	(United States) S Williams	6	6
(Germany) A Petkovic	2	2
(United States) V Lepchenko	6	6
16	(United States) S Stephens	2	2
WC	(Italy) C Giorgi	6	3	1
Q	(United States) C McHale	1	6	6
(China) S Zhang	7^{8}	5	6
5	(Czech Republic) P Kvitová	6^{6}	7	3

Third round
1	(United States) S Williams	6	6
(United States) V Lepchenko	1	2
Q	(United States) C McHale	2	6	2
(China) S Zhang	6	4	6

Quarterfinals
1	(United States) S Williams	6	6
(China) S Zhang	1	3

==== Section 2 ====
First round
(United States) M Keys	6	6
(United States) A Riske	2	2
(Germany) A Beck	3	1
(United States) V Williams	6	6
Q	(Germany) M Barthel	2	2
13	(Spain) C Suárez Navarro	6	6
11	(Serbia) A Ivanovic	6	6
WC	(Italy) K Knapp	1	1
(France) A Cornet	6	6
(Belgium) K Flipkens	3	2
Q	(Puerto Rico) M Puig	6	4	6
(Slovakia) D Hantuchová	0	6	0

Second round
4	(Romania) S Halep	5	6	6
(United States) M Keys	7	0	1
(United States) V Williams	4	2
13	(Spain) C Suárez Navarro	6	6
11	(Serbia) A Ivanovic	7^{7}	7
(France) A Cornet	6^{1}	5
Q	(Puerto Rico) M Puig	3	5
8	(Russia) M Sharapova	6	7

Third round
4	(Romania) S Halep
13	(Spain) C Suárez Navarro	w/o
11	(Serbia) A Ivanovic	6	6
8	(Russia) M Sharapova	1	4

Quarterfinals
13	(Spain) C Suárez Navarro	4	6	4
11	(Serbia) A Ivanovic	6	3	6

=== Bottom half ===
==== Section 3 ====
First round
(Russia) S Kuznetsova	7	6
(Russia) M Kirilenko	5	0
Q	(Switzerland) B Bencic	6	3	6
(Russia) A Pavlyuchenkova	3	6	3
(Austria) Y Meusburger	2	3
12	(Italy) F Pennetta	6	6
17	(Canada) E Bouchard	4	2
(Italy) F Schiavone	6	6
(Spain) G Muguruza	6	6
WC	(Italy) N Burnett	1	3
LL	(Argentina) P Ormaechea	6	6
(Japan) K Nara	4	3

Second round
6	(Serbia) J Janković	6	4
(Russia) S Kuznetsova	2	0^{r}
Q	(Switzerland) B Bencic	2	6	3
12	(Italy) F Pennetta	6	2	6
(Italy) F Schiavone	3	6	7^{7}
(Spain) G Muguruza	6	1	6^{5}
LL	(Argentina) P Ormaechea	3	2
3	(Poland) A Radwańska	6	6

Third round
6	(Serbia) J Janković	6	6
12	(Italy) F Pennetta	2	3
(Italy) F Schiavone	4	1
3	(Poland) A Radwańska	6	6

Quarterfinals
6	(Serbia) J Janković	6	6
3	(Poland) A Radwańska	4	4

==== Section 4 ====
First round
(Bulgaria) T Pironkova	6	1	4
Q	(Czech Republic) P Cetkovská	1	6	6
(Russia) E Makarova	6	7^{8}
(Italy) R Vinci	2	6^{6}
Q	(South Africa) C Scheepers	5	3
10	(Italy) S Errani	7	6
15	(Germany) S Lisicki	3	3
(Australia) S Stosur	6	6
(Ukraine) E Svitolina	2	3
(Russia) E Vesnina	6	6
(Slovakia) M Rybáriková	6	1	4
Q	(Australia) C Dellacqua	4	6	6

Second round
7	(Germany) A Kerber	6	3	4
Q	(Czech Republic) P Cetkovská	4	6	6
(Russia) E Makarova	2	3
10	(Italy) S Errani	6	6
(Australia) S Stosur	6	6
(Russia) E Vesnina	2	3
Q	(Australia) C Dellacqua	1	4
2	(China) N Li	6	6

Third round
Q	(Czech Republic) P Cetkovská	4	6^{3}
10	(Italy) S Errani	6	7^{7}
(Australia) S Stosur	3	1
2	(China) N Li	6	6

Quarterfinals
10	(Italy) S Errani	6	4	6
2	(China) N Li	3	6	2

== Qualifying ==
=== Seeds ===
1. (Spain) María Teresa Torró Flor (first round)
2. (Slovakia) Jana Čepelová (first round)
3. (Australia) Casey Dellacqua (qualified)
4. (United States) Christina McHale (qualified)
5. (New Zealand) Marina Erakovic (first round)
6. (Slovenia) Polona Hercog (first round)
7. (China) Zheng Jie (first round)
8. (Puerto Rico) Monica Puig (qualified)
9. (United States) Vania King (first round)
10. (United States) Lauren Davis (qualified)
11. (Argentina) Paula Ormaechea (qualifying competition, lucky loser)
12. (Switzerland) Stefanie Vögele (qualifying competition)
13. (Poland) Urszula Radwańska (qualifying competition)
14. (France) Virginie Razzano (qualifying competition, retired)
15. (Croatia) Ajla Tomljanović (qualifying competition)
16. (Romania) Monica Niculescu (qualifying competition)

=== Qualifiers ===
1. (Germany) Mona Barthel
2. (Czech Republic) Petra Cetkovská
3. (Australia) Casey Dellacqua
4. (United States) Christina McHale
5. (United States) Lauren Davis
6. (Switzerland) Belinda Bencic
7. (South Africa) Chanelle Scheepers
8. (Puerto Rico) Monica Puig

=== Lucky loser ===
1. (Argentina) Paula Ormaechea

=== First qualifier ===
First round
1	(Spain) María Teresa Torró Flor	1	2
(Germany) Mona Barthel	6	6
WC	(Italy) Gioia Barbieri	5	6	3
14	(France) Virginie Razzano	7	1	6

Qualifying competition
(Germany) Mona Barthel	6	0
14	(France) Virginie Razzano	3	0^{r}

=== Second qualifier ===
First round
2	(Slovakia) Jana Čepelová	4	3
(Czech Republic) Petra Cetkovská	6	6
(Israel) Shahar Pe'er	3	0
16	(Romania) Monica Niculescu	6	6

Qualifying competition
(Czech Republic) Petra Cetkovská	4	7	6
16	(Romania) Monica Niculescu	6	5	1

=== Third qualifier ===
First round
3	(Australia) Casey Dellacqua	6	7
WC	(Russia) Marina Shamayko	4	5
WC	(Italy) Anastasia Grymalska	2	4
11	(Argentina) Paula Ormaechea	6	6

Qualifying competition
3	(Australia) Casey Dellacqua	6	6
11	(Argentina) Paula Ormaechea	1	1

=== Fourth qualifier ===
First round
4	(United States) Christina McHale	6	6
(Israel) Julia Glushko	3	4
WC	(Italy) Corinna Dentoni	1	3
12	(Switzerland) Stefanie Vögele	6	6

Qualifying competition
4	(United States) Christina McHale	6	6
12	(Switzerland) Stefanie Vögele	4	2

=== Fifth qualifier ===
First round
5	(New Zealand) Marina Erakovic	5	5
(Germany) Julia Görges	7	7
(Croatia) Mirjana Lučić-Baroni	5	6	2
10	(United States) Lauren Davis	7	0	6

Qualifying competition
(Germany) Julia Görges	3	4
10	(United States) Lauren Davis	6	6

=== Sixth qualifier ===
First round
6	(Slovenia) Polona Hercog	7^{7}	3	4
(Switzerland) Belinda Bencic	6^{5}	6	6
(Kazakhstan) Zarina Diyas	6^{6}	2
13	(Poland) Urszula Radwańska	7^{8}	6

Qualifying competition
(Switzerland) Belinda Bencic	6	6
13	(Poland) Urszula Radwańska	1	2

=== Seventh qualifier ===
First round
7	(China) Zheng Jie	2	1
(South Africa) Chanelle Scheepers	6	6
(Poland) Katarzyna Piter	0	1
15	(Croatia) Ajla Tomljanović	6	6

Qualifying competition
(South Africa) Chanelle Scheepers	6	6
15	(Croatia) Ajla Tomljanović	2	0

=== Eighth qualifier ===
First round
8	(Puerto Rico) Monica Puig	6	6
(Brazil) Teliana Pereira	2	1
(France) Kristina Mladenovic	7^{7}	7^{7}
9	(United States) Vania King	6^{5}	6^{5}

Qualifying competition
8	(Puerto Rico) Monica Puig	6	6
(France) Kristina Mladenovic	4	3
