= 2014 Italian Open – Women's doubles =

Women's doubles
- 2014 Italian Open

Final
- Champions: (Czech Republic) Květa Peschke; (Slovenia) Katarina Srebotnik
- Runners-up: (Italy) Sara Errani; (Italy) Roberta Vinci
- Score: 4–0, ret.

Details
- Draw: 28
- Seeds: 8

Events
Singles	men	women
Doubles	men	women
← 2013 ·	Italian Open	· 2015 →

Hsieh Su-wei and Peng Shuai were the defending champions, but lost to Anabel Medina Garrigues and Yaroslava Shvedova in the second round.
Květa Peschke and Katarina Srebotnik won the title, defeating Sara Errani and Roberta Vinci in the final, 4–0, ret.

== Seeds ==
The top four seeds received a bye into the second round.

1. (Chinese Taipei) Hsieh Su-wei / (China) Peng Shuai (second round)
2. (Italy) Sara Errani / (Italy) Roberta Vinci (final, retired)
3. (Russia) Ekaterina Makarova / (Russia) Elena Vesnina (quarterfinals)
4. (Czech Republic) Květa Peschke / (Slovenia) Katarina Srebotnik (champions)
5. (Zimbabwe) Cara Black / (India) Sania Mirza (quarterfinals)
6. (United States) Raquel Kops-Jones / (United States) Abigail Spears (first round)
7. (Russia) Alla Kudryavtseva / (Australia) Anastasia Rodionova (first round)
8. (Germany) Julia Görges / (Germany) Anna-Lena Grönefeld (semifinals)

== Draw ==
=== Key ===
- Q = Qualifier
- WC = Wild card
- LL = Lucky loser
- Alt = Alternate
- ITF = ITF entry
- PR = Protected ranking
- SR = Special ranking
- SE = Special exempt
- JE = Junior exempt
- JR = Junior Accelerator Programme entrant
- CO = College Accelerator Programme entrant
- NG = Next Gen Accelerator Program entrant
- w/o = Walkover
- r = Retired
- d = Defaulted

=== Finals ===
Semifinals

Final

(Spain) Anabel Medina Garrigues
(Kazakhstan) Yaroslava Shvedova
6^{6}
4

4
- (Czech Republic) Květa Peschke
- (Slovenia) Katarina Srebotnik
7^{8}
6

4
- (Czech Republic) Květa Peschke
- (Slovenia) Katarina Srebotnik
4

2
- (Italy) Sara Errani
- (Italy) Roberta Vinci
0^{r}

8
- (Germany) Julia Görges
- (Germany) Anna-Lena Grönefeld
2
1

2
- (Italy) Sara Errani
- (Italy) Roberta Vinci
6
6

=== Top half ===
First round

Second round

Quarterfinals

Semifinals

1
- (Chinese Taipei) S-w Hsieh
- (China) S Peng
4
3

(Spain) A Medina Garrigues
(Kazakhstan) Y Shvedova
6
5
[10]

(Spain) A Medina Garrigues
(Kazakhstan) Y Shvedova
6
6

- (Russia) V Diatchenko
- (Georgia (country)) O Kalashnikova
2
7
[4]

(Spain) A Medina Garrigues
(Kazakhstan) Y Shvedova
6
6

- (Australia) C Dellacqua
- (Poland) K Jans-Ignacik
4
7
[10]

- (Australia) C Dellacqua
- (Poland) K Jans-Ignacik
4
1

- (Poland) K Piter
- (South Africa) C Scheepers
6
5
[2]

- (Australia) C Dellacqua
- (Poland) K Jans-Ignacik
w/o

- (Romania) M Niculescu
- (China) S Zhang
6
4
[10]

- (Romania) M Niculescu
- (China) S Zhang

7
- (Russia) A Kudryavtseva
- (Australia) A Rodionova
4
6
[8]

(Spain) A Medina Garrigues
(Kazakhstan) Y Shvedova
6^{6}
4

4
- (Czech Republic) K Peschke
- (Slovenia) K Srebotnik
7^{8}
6

4
- (Czech Republic) K Peschke
- (Slovenia) K Srebotnik
6
6

- (Russia) V Dushevina
- (China) S Zheng
6
6

- (Russia) V Dushevina
- (China) S Zheng
2
3

- (Slovenia) A Klepač
- (Czech Republic) V Uhlířová
3
1

4
- (Czech Republic) K Peschke
- (Slovenia) K Srebotnik
6
6

- (Canada) G Dabrowski
- (Poland) A Rosolska
3
1

(New Zealand) M Erakovic
(Spain) A Parra Santonja
4
4

- (France) K Mladenovic
- (Italy) F Pennetta
6
6

- (France) K Mladenovic
- (Italy) F Pennetta
6^{5}
0

(New Zealand) M Erakovic
(Spain) A Parra Santonja
6
6

(New Zealand) M Erakovic
(Spain) A Parra Santonja
7^{7}
6

6
- (United States) R Kops-Jones
- (United States) A Spears
4
4

=== Bottom half ===
First round

Second round

Quarterfinals

Semifinals

8
- (Germany) J Görges
- (Germany) A-L Grönefeld
6
6

WC
- (Italy) G Barbieri
- (Italy) N Burnett
4
4

8
- (Germany) J Görges
- (Germany) A-L Grönefeld
6
6

- (United States) L Huber
- (United States) L Raymond
6
6

- (United States) L Huber
- (United States) L Raymond
4
4

- (Chinese Taipei) H-c Chan
- (Chinese Taipei) Y-j Chan
2
2

8
- (Germany) J Görges
- (Germany) A-L Grönefeld
7
7^{7}

WC
- (Serbia) J Janković
- (Russia) A Kleybanova
7
6

3
- (Russia) E Makarova
- (Russia) E Vesnina
5
6^{3}

- (Russia) S Kuznetsova
- (Australia) S Stosur
5
4

WC
- (Serbia) J Janković
- (Russia) A Kleybanova
5
4

3
- (Russia) E Makarova
- (Russia) E Vesnina
7
6

8
- (Germany) J Görges
- (Germany) A-L Grönefeld
2
1

5
- (Zimbabwe) C Black
- (India) S Mirza
6
2
[10]

2
- (Italy) S Errani
- (Italy) R Vinci
6
6

- (Switzerland) M Hingis
- (Germany) S Lisicki
4
6
[8]

5
- (Zimbabwe) C Black
- (India) S Mirza
6
6

- (Slovakia) D Hantuchová
- (Croatia) M Lučić-Baroni
7^{7}
6

- (Slovakia) D Hantuchová
- (Croatia) M Lučić-Baroni
3
4

- (United States) V King
- (China) J Zheng
6^{1}
1

5
- (Zimbabwe) C Black
- (India) S Mirza
2
3

- (Croatia) D Jurak
- (United States) M Moulton-Levy
7^{7}
5
[11]

2
- (Italy) S Errani
- (Italy) R Vinci
6
6

WC
- (Italy) C Giorgi
- (Italy) K Knapp
6^{5}
7
[9]

- (Croatia) D Jurak
- (United States) M Moulton-Levy
1
0

2
- (Italy) S Errani
- (Italy) R Vinci
6
6
