= 2015 Italian Open (tennis) =

- Date: 10–17 May
- Edition: 72nd
- Category: Masters 1000; Premier 5
- Draw: 56S / 24D; 56S / 28D
- Prize money: €3,830,295 (ATP) $2,183,600 (WTA)
- Surface: Clay / outdoor
- Location: Rome, Italy
- Venue: Foro Italico

Champions

Men's singles
- (Serbia) Novak Djokovic

Women's singles
- (Russia) Maria Sharapova

Men's doubles
- (Uruguay) Pablo Cuevas / (Spain) David Marrero

Women's doubles
- (Hungary) Tímea Babos / (France) Kristina Mladenovic
- Italian Open

The 2015 Italian Open (also known as the 2015 Rome Masters or the sponsored title 2015 Internazionali BNL d'Italia) was a tennis tournament played on outdoor clay courts at the Foro Italico in Rome, Italy. It was the 72nd edition of the Italian Open and was classified as an ATP World Tour Masters 1000 event on the 2015 ATP World Tour and a Premier 5 event on the 2015 WTA Tour. It took place from 10 to 17 May 2015.

== Finals ==
=== Men's singles ===
- (Serbia) Novak Djokovic defeated (Switzerland) Roger Federer, 6–4, 6–3

=== Women's singles ===
- (Russia) Maria Sharapova defeated (Spain) Carla Suárez Navarro, 4–6, 7–5, 6–1

=== Men's doubles ===
- (Uruguay) Pablo Cuevas / (Spain) David Marrero defeated (Spain) Marcel Granollers / (Spain) Marc López, 6–4, 7–5

=== Women's doubles ===
- (Hungary) Tímea Babos / (France) Kristina Mladenovic defeated (Switzerland) Martina Hingis / (India) Sania Mirza, 6–4, 6–3

== Points and prize money ==
=== Point distribution ===
Event	W	F	SF	QF	Round of 16	Round of 32	Round of 64	Q	Q2	Q1
Men's singles	1000	600	360	180	90	45	10	25	16	0
Men's doubles	1000	600	360	180	90	0	—N/a	—N/a	—N/a	—N/a
Women's singles	900	585	350	190	105	60	1	30	20	1
Women's doubles	900	585	350	190	105	1	—N/a	—N/a	—N/a	—N/a

=== Prize money ===
Event	W	F	SF	QF	Round of 16	Round of 32	Round of 64	Q2	Q1
Men's singles	€628,100	€308,000	€155,000	€78,820	€40,930	€21,580	€11,650	€2,685	€1,370
Women's singles	€400,250	€199,750	€99,870	€46,000	€22,800	€11,710	€6,020	€3,350	€1,720
Men's doubles	€194,500	€95,230	€47,770	€24,520	€12,670	€6,690	—N/a	—N/a	—N/a
Women's doubles	€114,250	€57,840	€28,630	€14,410	€7,280	€3,605	—N/a	—N/a	—N/a

== ATP main draw entrants ==
=== Singles ===
==== Seeds ====
Country	Player	Rank^{1}	Seed
SRB	Novak Djokovic	1	1
SUI	Roger Federer	2	2
GBR	Andy Murray	3	3
ESP	Rafael Nadal	4	4
JPN	Kei Nishikori	5	5
CZE	Tomáš Berdych	7	6
ESP	David Ferrer	8	7
SUI	Stan Wawrinka	9	8
CRO	Marin Čilić	10	9
BUL	Grigor Dimitrov	11	10
ESP	Feliciano López	12	11
FRA	Gilles Simon	13	12
FRA	Jo-Wilfried Tsonga	14	13
ESP	Roberto Bautista Agut	16	14
RSA	Kevin Anderson	17	15
USA	John Isner	18	16

- Rankings are as of May 4, 2015.

==== Other entrants ====
The following players received wildcards into the main draw:

- (Italy) Matteo Donati
- (Italy) Federico Gaio
- (Italy) Paolo Lorenzi
- (Italy) Luca Vanni

The following players received entry using a protected ranking into the main draw:

- (Spain) Nicolás Almagro
- (Germany) Florian Mayer

The following players received entry from the qualifying draw:

- (Italy) Andrea Arnaboldi
- (Brazil) Thomaz Bellucci
- (Ukraine) Alexandr Dolgopolov
- (Italy) Thomas Fabbiano
- (Turkey) Marsel İlhan
- (Serbia) Dušan Lajović
- (Argentina) Diego Schwartzman

==== Withdrawals ====
Before the tournament

- (Germany) Benjamin Becker → replaced by (United States) Steve Johnson
- (France) Julien Benneteau → replaced by (Italy) Simone Bolelli
- (Croatia) Ivo Karlović → replaced by (Spain) Marcel Granollers
- (France) Gaël Monfils → replaced by (United States) Donald Young
- (Luxembourg) Gilles Müller → replaced by (United States) Jack Sock
- (Canada) Milos Raonic → replaced by (Austria) Dominic Thiem
- (Italy) Andreas Seppi → replaced by (Poland) Jerzy Janowicz
- (Spain) Tommy Robredo → replaced by (Czech Republic) Jiří Veselý
- (Spain) Fernando Verdasco → replaced by (Portugal) João Sousa

During the tournament

- (United Kingdom) Andy Murray (fatigue)

==== Retirements ====
- (Germany) Philipp Kohlschreiber
- (France) Gilles Simon

=== Doubles ===
==== Seeds ====
Country	Player	Country	Player	Rank^{1}	Seed
USA	Bob Bryan	USA	Mike Bryan	2	1
CRO	Ivan Dodig	BRA	Marcelo Melo	9	2
NED	Jean-Julien Rojer	ROU	Horia Tecău	23	3
POL	Marcin Matkowski	SRB	Nenad Zimonjić	26	4
ESP	Marcel Granollers	ESP	Marc López	27	5
CAN	Daniel Nestor	IND	Leander Paes	30	6
AUT	Alexander Peya	BRA	Bruno Soares	32	7
ITA	Simone Bolelli	ITA	Fabio Fognini	34	8

- Rankings are as of May 4, 2015.

==== Other entrants ====
The following pairs received wildcards into the doubles main draw:

- (Italy) Matteo Donati / (Italy) Stefano Napolitano
- (Italy) Paolo Lorenzi / (Italy) Luca Vanni

== WTA main draw entrants ==
=== Singles ===
==== Seeds ====
Country	Player	Rank^{1}	Seed
USA	Serena Williams	1	1
ROU	Simona Halep	2	2
RUS	Maria Sharapova	3	3
CZE	Petra Kvitová	4	4
DEN	Caroline Wozniacki	5	5
CAN	Eugenie Bouchard	6	6
SRB	Ana Ivanovic	7	7
RUS	Ekaterina Makarova	8	8
GER	Angelique Kerber	11	9
ESP	Carla Suárez Navarro	12	10
CZE	Karolína Plíšková	13	11
CZE	Lucie Šafářová	14	12
ITA	Sara Errani	15	13
USA	Venus Williams	16	14
USA	Madison Keys	17	15
SRB	Jelena Jankovic	18	16

- Rankings are as of May 4, 2015.

==== Other entrants ====
The following players received wildcards into the main draw:

- (Italy) Nastassja Burnett
- (Italy) Karin Knapp
- (Italy) Francesca Schiavone

The following players received entry from the qualifying draw:

- (Japan) Misaki Doi
- (Romania) Alexandra Dulgheru
- (Russia) Daria Gavrilova
- (Serbia) Bojana Jovanovski
- (United States) Christina McHale
- (Poland) Urszula Radwańska
- (Czech Republic) Kateřina Siniaková
- (Russia) Elena Vesnina

The following players received entry as lucky losers:

- (Czech Republic) Lucie Hradecká
- (France) Kristina Mladenovic
- (Slovakia) Anna Karolína Schmiedlová

==== Withdrawals ====
Before the tournament

- (Australia) Casey Dellacqua → replaced by (Czech Republic) Lucie Hradecká
- (Russia) Svetlana Kuznetsova → replaced by (France) Kristina Mladenovic
- (Spain) Garbiñe Muguruza → replaced by (Slovakia) Anna Karolína Schmiedlová
- (China) Peng Shuai → replaced by (Slovakia) Magdaléna Rybáriková
- (Germany) Andrea Petkovic → replaced by (Puerto Rico) Monica Puig
- (Poland) Agnieszka Radwańska → replaced by (Slovakia) Daniela Hantuchová

During the tournament

- (United States) Serena Williams

==== Retirements ====
- (Australia) Jarmila Gajdošová

=== Doubles ===
==== Seeds ====
Country	Player	Country	Player	Rank^{1}	Seed
SUI	Martina Hingis	IND	Sania Mirza	5	1
TPE	Hsieh Su-wei	ITA	Flavia Pennetta	25	2
HUN	Tímea Babos	FRA	Kristina Mladenovic	27	3
FRA	Caroline Garcia	SLO	Katarina Srebotnik	38	4
USA	Bethanie Mattek-Sands	CZE	Lucie Šafářová	41	5
CZE	Andrea Hlaváčková	CZE	Lucie Hradecká	45	6
TPE	Chan Yung-jan	CHN	Zheng Jie	49	7
RUS	Alla Kudryavtseva	RUS	Anastasia Pavlyuchenkova	53	8

- Rankings are as of May 4, 2015.

==== Other entrants ====
The following pairs received wildcards into the doubles main draw:

- (Italy) Nastassja Burnett / (Italy) Jasmine Paolini
- (Italy) Maria Elena Camerin / (Italy) Corinna Dentoni
- (Romania) Simona Halep / (Italy) Francesca Schiavone
- (Slovakia) Daniela Hantuchová / (Australia) Samantha Stosur
