= 2014 Italian Open (tennis) =

- Date: 11–18 May
- Edition: 71st
- Category: Masters 1000; Premier 5
- Draw: 56S / 24D; 56S / 28D
- Prize money: €2,884,675 $2,440,070
- Surface: Clay / outdoor
- Location: Rome, Italy
- Venue: Foro Italico

Champions

Men's singles
- (Serbia) Novak Djokovic

Women's singles
- (United States) Serena Williams

Men's doubles
- (Canada) Daniel Nestor / (Serbia) Nenad Zimonjić

Women's doubles
- (Czech Republic) Květa Peschke / (Slovenia) Katarina Srebotnik
- Italian Open

The 2014 Italian Open (also known as the 2014 Rome Masters and sponsored title 2014 Internazionali BNL d'Italia) was a tennis tournament played on outdoor clay courts at the Foro Italico in Rome, Italy. It was the 71st edition of the Italian Open and was classified as an ATP World Tour Masters 1000 event on the 2014 ATP World Tour and a Premier 5 event on the 2014 WTA Tour. It took place from 11 to 18 May 2014.

== Finals ==
=== Men's singles ===
- (Serbia) Novak Djokovic defeated (Spain) Rafael Nadal, 4–6, 6–3, 6–3

=== Women's singles ===
- (United States) Serena Williams defeated (Italy) Sara Errani, 6–3, 6–0

=== Men's doubles ===
- (Canada) Daniel Nestor / (Serbia) Nenad Zimonjić defeated (Netherlands) Robin Haase / (Spain) Feliciano López, 6–4, 7–6^{(7–2)}

=== Women's doubles ===
- (Czech Republic) Květa Peschke / (Slovenia) Katarina Srebotnik defeated (Italy) Sara Errani / (Italy) Roberta Vinci, 4–0, ret.

== Points and prize money ==
=== Point distribution ===
| Event | W | F | SF | QF | Round of 16 | Round of 32 | Round of 64 | Q | Q2 | Q1 |
| Men's singles | 1000 | 600 | 360 | 180 | 90 | 45 | 10 | 25 | 16 | 0 |
| Men's doubles | 1000 | 600 | 360 | 180 | 90 | 0 | —N/a | —N/a | —N/a | —N/a |
| Women's singles | 900 | 585 | 350 | 190 | 105 | 60 | 10 | 30 | 20 | 1 |
| Women's doubles | 900 | 585 | 350 | 190 | 105 | 10 | —N/a | —N/a | —N/a | —N/a |

=== Prize money ===
| Event | W | F | SF | QF | Round of 16 | Round of 32 | Round of 64 | Q2 | Q1 |
| Men's singles | €549,000 | €269,150 | €135,480 | €68,890 | €35,775 | €18,860 | €10,185 | €2,345 | €1,195 |
| Women's singles | €387,130 | €193,190 | €96,595 | €44,500 | €22,060 | €11,323 | €5,820 | €3,239 | €1,666 |
| Men's doubles | €170,000 | €83,240 | €41,750 | €21,430 | €11,080 | €5,840 | —N/a | —N/a | —N/a |
| Women's doubles | €110,770 | €55,948 | €22,694 | €13,940 | €7,040 | €3,489 | —N/a | —N/a | —N/a |

== ATP main draw entrants ==
=== Singles ===
==== Seeds ====
| Country | Player | Rank^{1} | Seed |
|---|---|---|---|
| ESP | Rafael Nadal | 1 | 1 |
| SRB | Novak Djokovic | 2 | 2 |
| SUI | Stan Wawrinka | 3 | 3 |
| SUI | Roger Federer | 4 | 4 |
| ESP | David Ferrer | 5 | 5 |
| CZE | Tomáš Berdych | 6 | 6 |
| GBR | Andy Murray | 8 | 7 |
| CAN | Milos Raonic | 9 | 8 |
| USA | John Isner | 10 | 9 |
| ~~JPN~~ | ~~Kei Nishikori~~ | ~~12~~ | ~~10~~ |
| FRA | Jo-Wilfried Tsonga | 13 | 11 |
| BUL | Grigor Dimitrov | 14 | 12 |
| ITA | Fabio Fognini | 15 | 13 |
| RUS | Mikhail Youzhny | 16 | 14 |
| GER | Tommy Haas | 17 | 15 |
| ESP | Tommy Robredo | 18 | 16 |

- Rankings are as of May 5, 2014.

==== Other entrants ====
The following players received wildcards into the main draw:

- (Italy) Simone Bolelli
- (Italy) Marco Cecchinato
- (Italy) Paolo Lorenzi
- (Italy) Filippo Volandri

The following player received entry using a protected ranking into the main draw:

- (Austria) Jürgen Melzer

The following players received entry from the qualifying draw:

- (Spain) Pablo Carreño Busta
- (Colombia) Santiago Giraldo
- (Kazakhstan) Andrey Golubev
- (Colombia) Alejandro González
- (Spain) Pere Riba
- (France) Stéphane Robert
- (Italy) Stefano Travaglia

The following player received entry as a lucky loser:

- (Colombia) Alejandro Falla

==== Withdrawals ====
Before the tournament

- (Spain) Nicolás Almagro → replaced by (Kazakhstan) Mikhail Kukushkin
- (Argentina) Juan Martín del Potro (wrist injury) → replaced by (Spain) Roberto Bautista Agut
- (France) Richard Gasquet → replaced by (Netherlands) Robin Haase
- (Germany) Florian Mayer → replaced by (France) Jérémy Chardy
- (France) Gaël Monfils → replaced by (Netherlands) Igor Sijsling
- (Japan) Kei Nishikori → replaced by (Colombia) Alejandro Falla
- (France) Benoît Paire → replaced by (Czech Republic) Radek Štěpánek

==== Retirements ====
- (Colombia) Alejandro Falla (right foot pain)
- (Colombia) Santiago Giraldo (abductor strain)
- (Kazakhstan) Andrey Golubev (hip flexor strain)
- (Germany) Tommy Haas

=== Doubles ===
==== Seeds ====
| Country | Player | Country | Player | Rank^{1} | Seed |
|---|---|---|---|---|---|
| USA | Bob Bryan | USA | Mike Bryan | 1 | 1 |
| AUT | Alexander Peya | BRA | Bruno Soares | 6 | 2 |
| CRO | Ivan Dodig | BRA | Marcelo Melo | 11 | 3 |
| ESP | David Marrero | ESP | Fernando Verdasco | 19 | 4 |
| FRA | Nicolas Mahut | FRA | Édouard Roger-Vasselin | 25 | 5 |
| CAN | Daniel Nestor | SRB | Nenad Zimonjić | 29 | 6 |
| POL | Łukasz Kubot | SWE | Robert Lindstedt | 34 | 7 |
| PHI | Treat Huey | GBR | Dominic Inglot | 41 | 8 |

- Rankings are as of May 5, 2014.

==== Other entrants ====
The following pairs received wildcards into the doubles main draw:

- (Italy) Daniele Bracciali / (Italy) Potito Starace
- (Italy) Marco Cecchinato / (Italy) Andreas Seppi

==== Withdrawals ====
During the tournament

- (Germany) Tommy Haas

== WTA main draw entrants ==
=== Singles ===
==== Seeds ====
| Country | Player | Rank^{1} | Seed |
|---|---|---|---|
| USA | Serena Williams | 1 | 1 |
| CHN | Li Na | 2 | 2 |
| POL | Agnieszka Radwańska | 3 | 3 |
| ROU | Simona Halep | 5 | 4 |
| CZE | Petra Kvitová | 6 | 5 |
| SRB | Jelena Janković | 7 | 6 |
| GER | Angelique Kerber | 8 | 7 |
| RUS | Maria Sharapova | 9 | 8 |
| SVK | Dominika Cibulková | 10 | 9 |
| ITA | Sara Errani | 11 | 10 |
| SRB | Ana Ivanovic | 12 | 11 |
| ITA | Flavia Pennetta | 13 | 12 |
| ESP | Carla Suárez Navarro | 14 | 13 |
| ~~DEN~~ | ~~Caroline Wozniacki~~ | ~~15~~ | ~~14~~ |
| GER | Sabine Lisicki | 16 | 15 |
| USA | Sloane Stephens | 17 | 16 |
| CAN | Eugenie Bouchard | 18 | 17 |

- Rankings are as of May 5, 2014.

==== Other entrants ====
The following players received wildcards into the main draw:

- (Italy) Nastassja Burnett
- (Italy) Camila Giorgi
- (Italy) Karin Knapp

The following player received entry using a protected ranking into the main draw:

- (Switzerland) Romina Oprandi

The following players received entry from the qualifying draw:

- (Germany) Mona Barthel
- (Switzerland) Belinda Bencic
- (Czech Republic) Petra Cetkovská
- (United States) Lauren Davis
- (Australia) Casey Dellacqua
- (United States) Christina McHale
- (Puerto Rico) Monica Puig
- (South Africa) Chanelle Scheepers

The following player received entry as a lucky loser:

- (Argentina) Paula Ormaechea

==== Withdrawals ====
Before the tournament

- (Belarus) Victoria Azarenka (left foot injury) → replaced by (United States) Varvara Lepchenko
- (Estonia) Kaia Kanepi (right heel injury) → replaced by (China) Peng Shuai
- (Denmark) Caroline Wozniacki (left knee injury) → replaced by (Argentina) Paula Ormaechea

During the tournament

- (Romania) Simona Halep (left abdominal injury)

==== Retirements ====
- (Russia) Svetlana Kuznetsova (left hip injury)

=== Doubles ===
==== Seeds ====
| Country | Player | Country | Player | Rank^{1} | Seed |
|---|---|---|---|---|---|
| TPE | Hsieh Su-wei | CHN | Peng Shuai | 3 | 1 |
| ITA | Sara Errani | ITA | Roberta Vinci | 6 | 2 |
| RUS | Ekaterina Makarova | RUS | Elena Vesnina | 11 | 3 |
| CZE | Květa Peschke | SLO | Katarina Srebotnik | 17 | 4 |
| ZIM | Cara Black | IND | Sania Mirza | 17 | 5 |
| USA | Raquel Kops-Jones | USA | Abigail Spears | 30 | 6 |
| RUS | Alla Kudryavtseva | AUS | Anastasia Rodionova | 38 | 7 |
| GER | Julia Görges | GER | Anna-Lena Grönefeld | 43 | 8 |

- Rankings are as of May 5, 2014.

==== Other entrants ====
The following pairs received wildcards into the doubles main draw:

- (Italy) Gioia Barbieri / (Italy) Nastassja Burnett
- (Italy) Camila Giorgi / (Italy) Karin Knapp
- (Serbia) Jelena Janković / (Russia) Alisa Kleybanova

==== Withdrawals ====
During the tournament

- (China) Zhang Shuai (shoulder injury)

==== Retirements ====
- (Italy) Sara Errani (left hip injury)
