= 2015 Italian Open – Men's singles =

Men's singles
- 2015 Italian Open

Final
- Champion: (Serbia) Novak Djokovic
- Runner-up: (Switzerland) Roger Federer
- Score: 6–4, 6–3

Events
Singles	men	women
Doubles	men	women
← 2014 ·	Italian Open	· 2016 →

Defending champion Novak Djokovic defeated Roger Federer in the final, 6–4, 6–3 to win the men's singles tennis title at the 2015 Italian Open. It was his fourth Italian Open title, the second-most of all time behind Rafael Nadal. This is notable for being the only clay court final contested between Djokovic and Federer. It was Federer's fourth runner-up finish at the Italian Open (following defeats to Félix Mantilla in 2003 and to Nadal in 2006 and 2013), his career-best result at the event.

== Seeds ==
The top eight seeds receive a bye into the second round.

1. (Serbia) Novak Djokovic (champion)
2. (Switzerland) Roger Federer (final)
3. (United Kingdom) Andy Murray (third round, withdrew because of fatigue)
4. (Spain) Rafael Nadal (quarterfinals)
5. (Japan) Kei Nishikori (quarterfinals)
6. (Czech Republic) Tomáš Berdych (quarterfinals)
7. (Spain) David Ferrer (semifinals)
8. (Switzerland) Stan Wawrinka (semifinals)

9. (Croatia) Marin Čilić (first round)
10. (Bulgaria) Grigor Dimitrov (second round)
11. (Spain) Feliciano López (second round)
12. (France) Gilles Simon (second round, retired because of a neck injury)
13. (France) Jo-Wilfried Tsonga (second round)
14. (Spain) Roberto Bautista Agut (second round)
15. (South Africa) Kevin Anderson (third round)
16. (United States) John Isner (third round)

Click on the seed number of a player to go to their draw section.

== Draw ==
=== Key ===
- Q = Qualifier
- WC = Wild card
- LL = Lucky loser
- Alt = Alternate
- ITF = ITF entry
- PR = Protected ranking
- SR = Special ranking
- SE = Special exempt
- JE = Junior exempt
- JR = Junior Accelerator Programme entrant
- CO = College Accelerator Programme entrant
- NG = Next Gen Accelerator Program entrant
- w/o = Walkover
- r = Retired
- d = Defaulted

=== Finals ===
Quarterfinals
1	(Serbia) Novak Djokovic	6	3	6
5	(Japan) Kei Nishikori	3	6	1
(Belgium) David Goffin	2	6	3
7	(Spain) David Ferrer	6	4	6
8	(Switzerland) Stan Wawrinka	7^{9}	6
4	(Spain) Rafael Nadal	6^{7}	2
6	(Czech Republic) Tomáš Berdych	3	3
2	(Switzerland) Roger Federer	6	6

Semifinals
1	(Serbia) Novak Djokovic	6	6
7	(Spain) David Ferrer	4	4
8	(Switzerland) Stan Wawrinka	4	2
2	(Switzerland) Roger Federer	6	6

Final
1	(Serbia) Novak Djokovic	6	6
2	(Switzerland) Roger Federer	4	3

=== Top half ===
==== Section 1 ====
First round
WC	(Italy) L Vanni	4	3
PR	(Spain) N Almagro	6	6
Q	(Brazil) T Bellucci	6	4
Q	(Argentina) D Schwartzman	4	3^{r}
(Spain) M Granollers	1	3
14	(Spain) R Bautista Agut	6	6
11	(Spain) F López	6	7^{7}
(Australia) N Kyrgios	4	6^{4}
(Australia) B Tomic	6^{3}	7^{7}	6^{4}
(Serbia) V Troicki	7^{7}	6^{4}	7^{7}
(Latvia) E Gulbis	6^{4}	6	3
(Czech Republic) J Veselý	7^{7}	2	6

Second round
1	(Serbia) N Djokovic	6	6^{5}	6
PR	(Spain) N Almagro	1	7^{7}	3
Q	(Brazil) T Bellucci	1	6	6
14	(Spain) R Bautista Agut	6	1	4
11	(Spain) F López	7^{7}	4	3
(Serbia) V Troicki	6^{2}	6	6
(Czech Republic) J Veselý	6^{3}	5
5	(Japan) K Nishikori	7^{7}	7

Third round
1	(Serbia) N Djokovic	5	6	6
Q	(Brazil) T Bellucci	7	2	3
(Serbia) V Troicki	4	3
5	(Japan) K Nishikori	6	6

Quarterfinals
1	(Serbia) N Djokovic	6	3	6
5	(Japan) K Nishikori	3	6	1

==== Section 2 ====
First round
(France) J Chardy	7^{7}	6
(Czech Republic) L Rosol	6^{0}	4
Q	(Italy) A Arnaboldi	7	2	1
(Belgium) D Goffin	5	6	6
(United States) S Querrey	6^{6}	0
13	(France) J-W Tsonga	7^{8}	6
9	(Croatia) M Čilić	4	3
(Spain) G García López	6	6
(Slovakia) M Kližan	4	1
Q	(Ukraine) A Dolgopolov	6	6
(France) R Gasquet	6	7^{7}
Q	(Italy) T Fabbiano	1	6^{0}

Second round
3	(United Kingdom) A Murray	6	6
(France) J Chardy	4	3
(Belgium) D Goffin	6	4	7
13	(France) J-W Tsonga	2	6	5
(Spain) G García López	6	6
Q	(Ukraine) A Dolgopolov	4	3
(France) R Gasquet	4	5
7	(Spain) D Ferrer	6	7

Third round
3	(United Kingdom) A Murray
(Belgium) D Goffin	w/o
(Spain) G García López	1	3
7	(Spain) D Ferrer	6	6

Quarterfinals
(Belgium) D Goffin	2	6	3
7	(Spain) D Ferrer	6	4	6

=== Bottom half ===
==== Section 3 ====
First round
(Argentina) J Mónaco	6	6^{5}	6
Q	(Serbia) D Lajović	3	7^{7}	2
(Italy) S Bolelli	6^{4}	6^{5}
(Austria) D Thiem	7^{7}	7^{7}
(United States) J Sock	6	6^{2}	3
12	(France) G Simon	4	7^{7}	6
16	(United States) J Isner	7	6
(Portugal) J Sousa	5	3
WC	(Italy) F Gaio	3	4
(Argentina) L Mayer	6	6
(France) A Mannarino	4	1
Q	(Turkey) M İlhan	6	6

Second round
8	(Switzerland) S Wawrinka	4	6	6
(Argentina) J Mónaco	6	3	2
(Austria) D Thiem	7^{7}	2
12	(France) G Simon	6^{5}	0^{r}
16	(United States) J Isner	7^{8}	6
(Argentina) L Mayer	6^{6}	4
Q	(Turkey) M İlhan	2	0
4	(Spain) R Nadal	6	6

Third round
8	(Switzerland) S Wawrinka	7^{7}	6
(Austria) D Thiem	6^{3}	4
16	(United States) J Isner	4	4
4	(Spain) R Nadal	6	6

Quarterfinals
8	(Switzerland) S Wawrinka	7^{9}	6
4	(Spain) R Nadal	6^{7}	2

==== Section 4 ====
First round
WC	(Italy) M Donati	2	6	6
(Colombia) S Giraldo	6	1	4
(United States) S Johnson	6^{0}	3
(Italy) F Fognini	7^{7}	6
(Poland) J Janowicz	3	6^{4}
10	(Bulgaria) G Dimitrov	6	7^{7}
15	(South Africa) K Anderson	7^{7}	4	7^{7}
PR	(Germany) F Mayer	6^{3}	6	6^{4}
(Germany) P Kohlschreiber	6	6
(United States) D Young	4	1
(Uruguay) P Cuevas	6	6
WC	(Italy) P Lorenzi	3	2

Second round
6	(Czech Republic) T Berdych	6	6
WC	(Italy) M Donati	2	4
(Italy) F Fognini	7^{11}	4	6
10	(Bulgaria) G Dimitrov	6^{9}	6	0
15	(South Africa) K Anderson	3
(Germany) P Kohlschreiber	0^{r}
(Uruguay) P Cuevas	6^{3}	4
2	(Switzerland) R Federer	7^{7}	6

Third round
6	(Czech Republic) T Berdych	6	3	7^{7}
(Italy) F Fognini	3	6	6^{2}
15	(South Africa) K Anderson	3	5
2	(Switzerland) R Federer	6	7

Quarterfinals
6	(Czech Republic) T Berdych	3	3
2	(Switzerland) R Federer	6	6

== Qualifying ==
=== Seeds ===
1. (Croatia) Borna Ćorić (qualifying competition)
2. (Kazakhstan) Mikhail Kukushkin (first round)
3. (Argentina) Diego Schwartzman (qualified)
4. (Spain) Pablo Carreño Busta (first round)
5. (Spain) Daniel Gimeno Traver (first round)
6. (Uzbekistan) Denis Istomin (first round)
7. (Argentina) Federico Delbonis (qualifying competition)
8. (France) Benoît Paire (qualifying competition)
9. (Ukraine) Alexandr Dolgopolov (qualified)
10. (Serbia) Dušan Lajović (qualified)
11. (Slovenia) Blaž Kavčič (first round, retired)
12. (Brazil) Thomaz Bellucci (qualified)
13. (Brazil) João Souza (first round)
14. (Austria) Jürgen Melzer (first round)

=== Qualifiers ===
1. (Serbia) Dušan Lajović
2. (Italy) Andrea Arnaboldi
3. (Argentina) Diego Schwartzman
4. (Italy) Thomas Fabbiano
5. (Turkey) Marsel İlhan
6. (Brazil) Thomaz Bellucci
7. (Ukraine) Alexandr Dolgopolov

=== Qualifying draw ===
==== First qualifier ====
First round
1	(Croatia) Borna Ćorić	4	6	7^{7}
WC	(Italy) Salvatore Caruso	6	2	6^{5}
(Italy) Marco Cecchinato	6^{3}	2
10	(Serbia) Dušan Lajović	7^{7}	6

Qualifying competition
1	(Croatia) Borna Ćorić	1	4
10	(Serbia) Dušan Lajović	6	6

==== Second qualifier ====
First round
2	(Kazakhstan) Mikhail Kukushkin	6	5	2
(Italy) Andrea Arnaboldi	2	7	6
WC	(Italy) Stefano Napolitano	6	7
14	(Austria) Jürgen Melzer	4	5

Qualifying competition
(Italy) Andrea Arnaboldi	6	6
WC	(Italy) Stefano Napolitano	3	4

==== Third qualifier ====
First round
3	(Argentina) Diego Schwartzman	7^{7}	6
(Russia) Andrey Kuznetsov	6^{5}	2
WC	(Italy) Gianluigi Quinzi	6^{6}	4
8	(France) Benoît Paire	7^{8}	6

Qualifying competition
3	(Argentina) Diego Schwartzman	7	4	6
8	(France) Benoît Paire	5	6	2

==== Fourth qualifier ====
First round
4	(Spain) Pablo Carreño Busta	4	7^{8}	3
Alt	(Russia) Andrey Rublev	6	6^{6}	6
Alt	(Italy) Thomas Fabbiano	6	6
13	(Brazil) João Souza	4	2

Qualifying competition
Alt	(Russia) Andrey Rublev	6^{3}	3
Alt	(Italy) Thomas Fabbiano	7^{7}	6

==== Fifth qualifier ====
First round
5	(Spain) Daniel Gimeno Traver	4	1
(Turkey) Marsel İlhan	6	6
WC	(Italy) Gianluca Mager	4	0
11	(Slovenia) Blaž Kavčič	6	1^{r}

Qualifying competition
(Turkey) Marsel İlhan	6	7
WC	(Italy) Gianluca Mager	4	5

==== Sixth qualifier ====
First round
6	(Uzbekistan) Denis Istomin	3	3
(Croatia) Ivan Dodig	6	6
(Colombia) Alejandro González	2	0
12	(Brazil) Thomaz Bellucci	6	6

Qualifying competition
(Croatia) Ivan Dodig	6^{4}	4
12	(Brazil) Thomaz Bellucci	7^{7}	6

==== Seventh qualifier ====
First round
7	(Argentina) Federico Delbonis	6	6
(Colombia) Alejandro Falla	1	4
(Italy) Roberto Marcora	4	4
9	(Ukraine) Alexandr Dolgopolov	6	6

Qualifying competition
7	(Argentina) Federico Delbonis	3	4
9	(Ukraine) Alexandr Dolgopolov	6	6
