= 2015 Italian Open – Men's doubles =

Men's doubles
- 2015 Italian Open

Final
- Champions: (Uruguay) Pablo Cuevas (Spain) David Marrero
- Runners-up: (Spain) Marcel Granollers (Spain) Marc López
- Score: 6–4, 7–5

Events
Singles	men	women
Doubles	men	women
← 2014 ·	Italian Open	· 2016 →

Daniel Nestor and Nenad Zimonjić were the defending champions, but chose not to participate together. Nestor played alongside Leander Paes, but lost in the second round to Pablo Cuevas and David Marrero. Zimonjić teamed up with Marcin Matkowski, but lost in the second round to Jamie Murray and John Peers.
Cuevas and Marrero went on to win the title, defeating Marcel Granollers and Marc López in the final, 6–4, 7–5.

== Seeds ==
All seeds receive a bye into the second round.

1. (United States) Bob Bryan / (United States) Mike Bryan (second round)
2. (Croatia) Ivan Dodig / (Brazil) Marcelo Melo (quarterfinals)
3. (Netherlands) Jean-Julien Rojer / (Romania) Horia Tecău (quarterfinals)
4. (Poland) Marcin Matkowski / (Serbia) Nenad Zimonjić (second round)
5. (Spain) Marcel Granollers / (Spain) Marc López (final)
6. (Canada) Daniel Nestor / (India) Leander Paes (second round)
7. (Austria) Alexander Peya / (Brazil) Bruno Soares (second round)
8. (Italy) Simone Bolelli / (Italy) Fabio Fognini (second round)

== Draw ==
=== Key ===
- Q = Qualifier
- WC = Wild card
- LL = Lucky loser
- Alt = Alternate
- SE = Special exempt
- PR = Protected ranking
- ITF = ITF entry
- JE = Junior exempt
- w/o = Walkover
- r = Retired
- d = Defaulted
- SR = Special ranking

=== Finals ===
Semifinals
(South Africa) Kevin Anderson (France) Jérémy Chardy	4	4
(Uruguay) Pablo Cuevas (Spain) David Marrero	6	6
5	(Spain) Marcel Granollers (Spain) Marc López	6	3	[11]
(Australia) Nick Kyrgios (United States) Jack Sock	1	6	[9]

Final
(Uruguay) Pablo Cuevas (Spain) David Marrero	6	7
5	(Spain) Marcel Granollers (Spain) Marc López	4	5

=== Top half ===
First round
(Croatia) M Draganja (Finland) H Kontinen	2	5
(South Africa) K Anderson (France) J Chardy	6	7
WC	(Italy) P Lorenzi (Italy) L Vanni	6^{5}	3
(Colombia) JS Cabal (Colombia) R Farah	7^{7}	6
(Argentina) L Mayer (Argentina) J Mónaco	3	4
(India) R Bopanna (Romania) F Mergea	6	6
(Uruguay) P Cuevas (Spain) D Marrero	6	4	[13]
(Slovakia) M Kližan (Austria) P Oswald	4	6	[11]

Second round
1	(United States) B Bryan (United States) M Bryan	1	5
(South Africa) K Anderson (France) J Chardy	6	7
(Colombia) JS Cabal (Colombia) R Farah	7^{7}	3	[11]
7	(Austria) A Peya (Brazil) B Soares	6^{3}	6	[9]
3	(Netherlands) J-J Rojer (Romania) H Tecău	6	5	[10]
(India) R Bopanna (Romania) F Mergea	2	7	[8]
(Uruguay) P Cuevas (Spain) D Marrero	6	6
6	(Canada) D Nestor (India) L Paes	2	4

Quarterfinals
(South Africa) K Anderson (France) J Chardy	6	6
(Colombia) JS Cabal (Colombia) R Farah	3	4
3	(Netherlands) J-J Rojer (Romania) H Tecău	6^{2}	6	[5]
(Uruguay) P Cuevas (Spain) D Marrero	7^{7}	4	[10]

Semifinals
(South Africa) K Anderson (France) J Chardy	4	4
(Uruguay) P Cuevas (Spain) D Marrero	6	6

=== Bottom half ===
First round
PR	(Spain) N Almagro (Spain) G García López	2	6	[10]
(Sweden) R Lindstedt (Australia) B Tomic	6	0	[7]
(United Kingdom) J Murray (Australia) J Peers	6	6
(Spain) F López (Austria) J Melzer	3	4
(Czech Republic) L Rosol (France) G Simon	3	6	[8]
(Australia) N Kyrgios (United States) J Sock	6	1	[10]
(United States) J Isner (United States) S Querrey	6^{4}	6	[12]
WC	(Italy) M Donati (Italy) S Napolitano	7^{7}	4	[14]

Second round
5	(Spain) M Granollers (Spain) M López	6	6
PR	(Spain) N Almagro (Spain) G García López	4	4
(United Kingdom) J Murray (Australia) J Peers	7^{7}	7
4	(Poland) M Matkowski (Serbia) N Zimonjić	6^{4}	5
8	(Italy) S Bolelli (Italy) F Fognini	6	1	[4]
(Australia) N Kyrgios (United States) J Sock	2	6	[10]
WC	(Italy) M Donati (Italy) S Napolitano	4	3
2	(Croatia) I Dodig (Brazil) M Melo	6	6

Quarterfinals
5	(Spain) M Granollers (Spain) M López	6	6
(United Kingdom) J Murray (Australia) J Peers	4	4
(Australia) N Kyrgios (United States) J Sock	1	7	[10]
2	(Croatia) I Dodig (Brazil) M Melo	6	5	[7]

Semifinals
5	(Spain) M Granollers (Spain) M López	6	3	[11]
(Australia) N Kyrgios (United States) J Sock	1	6	[9]
