= 2014 Italian Open – Men's doubles =

Men's doubles
- 2014 Italian Open

Final
- Champions: (Canada) Daniel Nestor; (Serbia) Nenad Zimonjić
- Runners-up: (Netherlands) Robin Haase; (Spain) Feliciano López
- Score: 6–4, 7–6^{(7–2)}

Events
Singles	men	women
Doubles	men	women
← 2013 ·	Italian Open	· 2015 →

Bob Bryan and Mike Bryan were the defending champions, but lost to Daniel Nestor and Nenad Zimonjić in the semifinals.
Nestor and Zimonjić went on to win the title, defeating Robin Haase and Feliciano López in the final, 6–4, 7–6^{(7–2)}.

== Seeds ==
All seeds receive a bye into the second round.

1. (United States) Bob Bryan / (United States) Mike Bryan (semifinals)
2. (Austria) Alexander Peya / (Brazil) Bruno Soares (second round)
3. (Croatia) Ivan Dodig / (Brazil) Marcelo Melo (quarterfinals)
4. (Spain) David Marrero / (Spain) Fernando Verdasco (quarterfinals)
5. (France) Nicolas Mahut / (France) Édouard Roger-Vasselin (second round)
6. (Canada) Daniel Nestor / (Serbia) Nenad Zimonjić (champions)
7. (Poland) Łukasz Kubot / (Sweden) Robert Lindstedt (second round)
8. (Philippines) Treat Huey / (United Kingdom) Dominic Inglot (second round)

== Draw ==
=== Key ===
- Q = Qualifier
- WC = Wild card
- LL = Lucky loser
- Alt = Alternate
- SE = Special exempt
- PR = Protected ranking
- ITF = ITF entry
- JE = Junior exempt
- w/o = Walkover
- r = Retired
- d = Defaulted
- SR = Special ranking

=== Finals ===
Semifinals
1	(United States) Bob Bryan (United States) Mike Bryan	6^{3}	6	[10]
6	(Canada) Daniel Nestor (Serbia) Nenad Zimonjić	7^{7}	4	[12]
(Netherlands) Robin Haase (Spain) Feliciano López	6	6
(Bulgaria) Grigor Dimitrov (Czech Republic) Lukáš Rosol	2	4

Final
6	(Canada) Daniel Nestor (Serbia) Nenad Zimonjić	6	7^{7}
(Netherlands) Robin Haase (Spain) Feliciano López	4	6^{2}

=== Top half ===
First round
(Netherlands) J-J Rojer (Romania) H Tecău	6	3	[9]
(India) R Bopanna (Pakistan) A-u-H Qureshi	3	6	[11]
(Germany) T Haas (Czech Republic) R Štěpánek	3	6	[10]
(United States) J Isner (United States) S Lipsky	6	2	[5]
(Poland) M Fyrstenberg (Poland) M Matkowski	3	6	[5]
(Spain) P Andújar (Spain) M Granollers	6	4	[10]
WC	(Italy) M Cecchinato (Italy) A Seppi	6^{6}	2
PR	(South Africa) K Anderson (Austria) J Melzer	7^{8}	6

Second round
1	(United States) B Bryan (United States) M Bryan	7	6
(India) R Bopanna (Pakistan) A-u-H Qureshi	5	1
(Germany) T Haas (Czech Republic) R Štěpánek	6	6^{1}	[11]
7	(Poland) Ł Kubot (Sweden) R Lindstedt	2	7^{7}	[9]
4	(Spain) D Marrero (Spain) F Verdasco	7	6
(Spain) P Andújar (Spain) M Granollers	5	1
PR	(South Africa) K Anderson (Austria) J Melzer	6	6^{4}	[12]
6	(Canada) D Nestor (Serbia) N Zimonjić	3	7^{7}	[14]

Quarterfinals
1	(United States) B Bryan (United States) M Bryan	w/o
(Germany) T Haas (Czech Republic) R Štěpánek
4	(Spain) D Marrero (Spain) F Verdasco	6	3	[7]
6	(Canada) D Nestor (Serbia) N Zimonjić	4	6	[10]

Semifinals
1	(United States) B Bryan (United States) M Bryan	6^{3}	6	[10]
6	(Canada) D Nestor (Serbia) N Zimonjić	7^{7}	4	[12]

=== Bottom half ===
First round
PR	(Italy) S Bolelli (Italy) F Fognini	3	2
(Netherlands) R Haase (Spain) F López	6	6
(Belarus) M Mirnyi (Russia) M Youzhny	6	5	[10]
WC	(Italy) D Bracciali (Italy) P Starace	3	7	[4]
(Canada) V Pospisil (Russia) D Tursunov	4	7^{7}	[5]
(Croatia) M Čilić (Mexico) S González	6	6^{3}	[10]
(Bulgaria) G Dimitrov (Czech Republic) L Rosol	7^{7}	7^{7}
(Colombia) J S Cabal (Colombia) R Farah	6^{5}	6^{5}

Second round
8	(Philippines) T Huey (United Kingdom) D Inglot	6^{2}	2
(Netherlands) R Haase (Spain) F López	7^{7}	6
(Belarus) M Mirnyi (Russia) M Youzhny	6^{5}	7	[6]
3	(Croatia) I Dodig (Brazil) M Melo	7^{7}	5	[10]
5	(France) N Mahut (France) É Roger-Vasselin	4	7^{7}	[8]
(Croatia) M Čilić (Mexico) S González	6	6^{2}	[10]
(Bulgaria) G Dimitrov (Czech Republic) L Rosol	6	3	[10]
2	(Austria) A Peya (Brazil) B Soares	4	6	[2]

Quarterfinals
(Netherlands) R Haase (Spain) F López	6	6
3	(Croatia) I Dodig (Brazil) M Melo	3	2
(Croatia) M Čilić (Mexico) S González	6	4	[8]
(Bulgaria) G Dimitrov (Czech Republic) L Rosol	4	6	[10]

Semifinals
(Netherlands) R Haase (Spain) F López	6	6
(Bulgaria) G Dimitrov (Czech Republic) L Rosol	2	4
