= 2014 Italian Open – Men's singles =

Men's singles
- 2014 Italian Open

Final
- Champion: (Serbia) Novak Djokovic
- Runner-up: (Spain) Rafael Nadal
- Score: 4–6, 6–3, 6–3

Events
Singles	men	women
Doubles	men	women
- Italian Open

Novak Djokovic defeated two-time defending champion Rafael Nadal in the final, 4–6, 6–3, 6–3 to win the men's singles tennis title at the 2014 Italian Open. The final was a rematch of the 2009, 2011, and 2012 finals.

== Seeds ==
The top eight seeds receive a bye into the second round.

1. (Spain) Rafael Nadal (final)
2. (Serbia) Novak Djokovic (champion)
3. (Switzerland) Stan Wawrinka (third round)
4. (Switzerland) Roger Federer (second round)
5. (Spain) David Ferrer (quarterfinals)
6. (Czech Republic) Tomáš Berdych (third round)
7. (United Kingdom) Andy Murray (quarterfinals)
8. (Canada) Milos Raonic (semifinals)
9. (United States) John Isner (first round)
10. (Japan) ~~Kei Nishikori~~ (withdrew because of a back injury)
11. (France) Jo-Wilfried Tsonga (third round)
12. (Bulgaria) Grigor Dimitrov (semifinals)
13. (Italy) Fabio Fognini (first round)
14. (Russia) Mikhail Youzhny (third round)
15. (Germany) Tommy Haas (quarterfinals, retired)
16. (Spain) Tommy Robredo (second round)

Click on the seed number of a player to go to their draw section.

== Draw ==
Key

- Q = Qualifier
- WC = Wild card
- LL = Lucky loser
- Alt = Alternate
- ITF = ITF entry
- PR = Protected ranking
- SR = Special ranking
- SE = Special exempt
- JE = Junior exempt
- JR = Junior Accelerator Programme entrant
- CO = College Accelerator Programme entrant
- NG = Next Gen Accelerator Program entrant
- w/o = Walkover
- r = Retired
- d = Defaulted

=== Finals ===
Quarterfinals
1	(Spain) Rafael Nadal	1	6	7
7	(United Kingdom) Andy Murray	6	3	5
15	(Germany) Tommy Haas	2	0^{r}
12	(Bulgaria) Grigor Dimitrov	6	0
8	(Canada) Milos Raonic	6	5	6
(France) Jérémy Chardy	3	7	2
5	(Spain) David Ferrer	5	6	3
2	(Serbia) Novak Djokovic	7	4	6

Semifinals
1	(Spain) Rafael Nadal	6	6
12	(Bulgaria) Grigor Dimitrov	2	2
8	(Canada) Milos Raonic	7^{7}	6^{4}	3
2	(Serbia) Novak Djokovic	6^{5}	7^{7}	6

Final
1	(Spain) Rafael Nadal	6	3	3
2	(Serbia) Novak Djokovic	4	6	6

=== Top half ===
==== Section 1 ====
First round
(France) G Simon	6	6
WC	(Italy) F Volandri	2	3
Q	(Kazakhstan) A Golubev	6	7
(Spain) F Verdasco	4	5
(France) N Mahut	4	4
14	(Russia) M Youzhny	6	6
9	(United States) J Isner	6^{7}	3
PR	(Austria) J Melzer	7^{9}	6
Q	(Colombia) S Giraldo	4	0^{r}
(Croatia) M Čilić	6	2
(Spain) M Granollers	7	6
(Spain) F López	5	1

Second round
1	(Spain) R Nadal	7^{7}	6^{4}	6
(France) G Simon	6^{1}	7^{7}	2
Q	(Kazakhstan) A Golubev	5	1^{r}
14	(Russia) M Youzhny	7	4
PR	(Austria) J Melzer	6	6^{5}	6
(Croatia) M Čilić	2	7^{7}	3
(Spain) M Granollers	2	5
7	(United Kingdom) A Murray	6	7

Third round
1	(Spain) R Nadal	6^{4}	6	6
14	(Russia) M Youzhny	7^{7}	2	1
PR	(Austria) J Melzer	6^{1}	4
7	(United Kingdom) A Murray	7^{7}	6

Quarterfinals
1	(Spain) R Nadal	1	6	7
7	(United Kingdom) A Murray	6	3	5

==== Section 2 ====
First round
WC	(Italy) P Lorenzi	6^{3}	3
Q	(Spain) P Riba	7^{7}	6
WC	(Italy) M Cecchinato	6^{4}	5
(Netherlands) I Sijsling	7^{7}	7
(Italy) A Seppi	1	6	3
15	(Germany) T Haas	6	4	6
12	(Bulgaria) G Dimitrov	4	6	6
(France) É Roger-Vasselin	6	3	4
Q	(Spain) P Carreño Busta	6	3	6^{4}
(Croatia) I Karlović	3	6	7^{7}
(Russia) D Tursunov	6	7^{7}
(Spain) R Bautista Agut	0	6^{4}

Second round
3	(Switzerland) S Wawrinka	6	6
Q	(Spain) P Riba	0	3
(Netherlands) I Sijsling	6^{6}	1
15	(Germany) T Haas	7^{8}	6
12	(Bulgaria) G Dimitrov	7^{7}	6
(Croatia) I Karlović	6^{3}	4
(Russia) D Tursunov	4	3
6	(Czech Republic) T Berdych	6	6

Third round
3	(Switzerland) S Wawrinka	7	2	3
15	(Germany) T Haas	5	6	6
12	(Bulgaria) G Dimitrov	6^{3}	6	6
6	(Czech Republic) T Berdych	7^{7}	2	2

Quarterfinals
15	(Germany) T Haas	2	0^{r}
12	(Bulgaria) G Dimitrov	6	0

=== Bottom half ===
==== Section 3 ====
First round
WC	(Italy) S Bolelli	3	7	7^{7}
Q	(Italy) S Travaglia	6	5	6^{5}
(South Africa) K Anderson	7	7^{7}
(Canada) V Pospisil	5	6^{4}
(Ukraine) A Dolgopolov	3	6^{5}
11	(France) J-W Tsonga	6	7^{7}
13	(Italy) F Fognini	3	2
(Czech Republic) L Rosol	6	6
(Argentina) F Delbonis	3	4
(Croatia) I Dodig	6	6
(Netherlands) R Haase	4	4
(France) J Chardy	6	6

Second round
8	(Canada) M Raonic	6	7^{7}
WC	(Italy) S Bolelli	3	6^{5}
(South Africa) K Anderson	6^{14}	6^{5}
11	(France) J-W Tsonga	7^{16}	7^{7}
(Czech Republic) L Rosol	1	2
(Croatia) I Dodig	6	6
(France) J Chardy	1	6	7^{8}
4	(Switzerland) R Federer	6	3	6^{6}

Third round
8	(Canada) M Raonic	7^{7}	6
11	(France) J-W Tsonga	6^{5}	4
(Croatia) I Dodig	3	2
(France) J Chardy	6	6

Quarterfinals
8	(Canada) M Raonic	6	5	6
(France) J Chardy	3	7	2

==== Section 4 ====
First round
(Kazakhstan) M Kukushkin	6	6^{1}	6
(Portugal) J Sousa	3	7^{7}	3
Q	(Colombia) A González	6	4	1
Q	(France) S Robert	1	6	6
(Latvia) E Gulbis	6	0
LL	(Colombia) A Falla	1	0^{r}
16	(Spain) T Robredo	7^{7}	6
(Argentina) J Mónaco	6^{3}	4
(Poland) J Janowicz	6	6^{6}	2
(Germany) P Kohlschreiber	4	7^{8}	6
(Spain) P Andújar	7	3	4
(Czech Republic) R Štěpánek	5	6	6

Second round
5	(Spain) D Ferrer	6	6
(Kazakhstan) M Kukushkin	1	2
Q	(France) S Robert	7^{7}	4	3
(Latvia) E Gulbis	6^{1}	6	6
16	(Spain) T Robredo	2	4
(Germany) P Kohlschreiber	6	6
(Czech Republic) R Štěpánek	3	5
2	(Serbia) N Djokovic	6	7

Third round
5	(Spain) D Ferrer	6	6
(Latvia) E Gulbis	2	3
(Germany) P Kohlschreiber	6	2	1
2	(Serbia) N Djokovic	4	6	6

Quarterfinals
5	(Spain) D Ferrer	5	6	3
2	(Serbia) N Djokovic	7	4	6

== Qualifying ==
=== Seeds ===
1. (Colombia) Santiago Giraldo (qualified)
2. (Argentina) Carlos Berlocq (first round)
3. (Spain) Albert Montañés (first round)
4. (Kazakhstan) Andrey Golubev (qualified)
5. (Spain) Pablo Carreño Busta (qualified)
6. (Colombia) Alejandro Falla (qualifying competition, lucky loser)
7. (United States) Sam Querrey (qualifying competition)
8. (Spain) Daniel Gimeno Traver (first round)
9. (United States) Jack Sock (first round)
10. (Poland) Łukasz Kubot (first round)
11. (Australia) Bernard Tomic (first round)
12. (Colombia) Alejandro González (qualified)
13. (Serbia) Dušan Lajović (Qualfifying competition)
14. (France) Stéphane Robert (qualified)

=== Qualifiers ===
1. (Colombia) Santiago Giraldo
2. (France) Stéphane Robert
3. (Italy) Stefano Travaglia
4. (Kazakhstan) Andrey Golubev
5. (Spain) Pablo Carreño Busta
6. (Colombia) Alejandro González
7. (Spain) Pere Riba

=== Lucky loser ===
1. (Colombia) Alejandro Falla

=== First qualifier ===
First round
1	(Colombia) Santiago Giraldo	6	6
WC	(Italy) Flavio Cipolla	1	3
(Dominican Republic) Víctor Estrella Burgos	7	6
11	(Australia) Bernard Tomic	5	3

Qualifying competition
1	(Colombia) Santiago Giraldo	6	6
(Dominican Republic) Víctor Estrella Burgos	1	1

=== Second qualifier ===
First round
2	(Argentina) Carlos Berlocq	3	6	2
(Spain) Albert Ramos	6	4	6
(Germany) Tobias Kamke	4	4
14	(France) Stéphane Robert	6	6

Qualifying competition
(Spain) Albert Ramos	4	4
14	(France) Stéphane Robert	6	6

=== Third qualifier ===
First round
3	(Spain) Albert Montañés	6^{4}	4
WC	(Italy) Stefano Travaglia	7^{7}	6
(Slovenia) Blaž Rola	6^{6}	7	6
8	(Spain) Daniel Gimeno Traver	7^{8}	5	4

Qualifying competition
WC	(Italy) Stefano Travaglia	6	6
(Slovenia) Blaž Rola	4	2

=== Fourth qualifier ===
First round
4	(Kazakhstan) Andrey Golubev	4	6	6
(France) Pierre-Hugues Herbert	6	4	2
(France) Adrian Mannarino	7	6
10	(Poland) Łukasz Kubot	5	4

Qualifying competition
4	(Kazakhstan) Andrey Golubev	6	6
(France) Adrian Mannarino	3	4

=== Fifth qualifier ===
First round
5	(Spain) Pablo Carreño Busta	6	6
(Germany) Michael Berrer	4	4
(Russia) Alex Bogomolov Jr.	2	1
13	(Serbia) Dušan Lajović	6	6

Qualifying competition
5	(Spain) Pablo Carreño Busta	6	2	6
13	(Serbia) Dušan Lajović	2	6	3

=== Sixth qualifier ===
First round
6	(Colombia) Alejandro Falla	6	3	6
(Russia) Evgeny Donskoy	4	6	2
WC	(Italy) Matteo Donati	4	4
12	(Colombia) Alejandro González	6	6

Qualifying competition
6	(Colombia) Alejandro Falla	4	4
12	(Colombia) Alejandro González	6	6

=== Seventh qualifier ===
First round
7	(United States) Sam Querrey	6	6
WC	(Italy) Salvatore Caruso	2	3
(Spain) Pere Riba	6	2	7^{7}
9	(United States) Jack Sock	4	6	6^{3}

Qualifying competition
7	(United States) Sam Querrey	6^{6}	3
(Spain) Pere Riba	7^{8}	6
