= Nastassja Burnett =

Italian tennis player (born 1992)

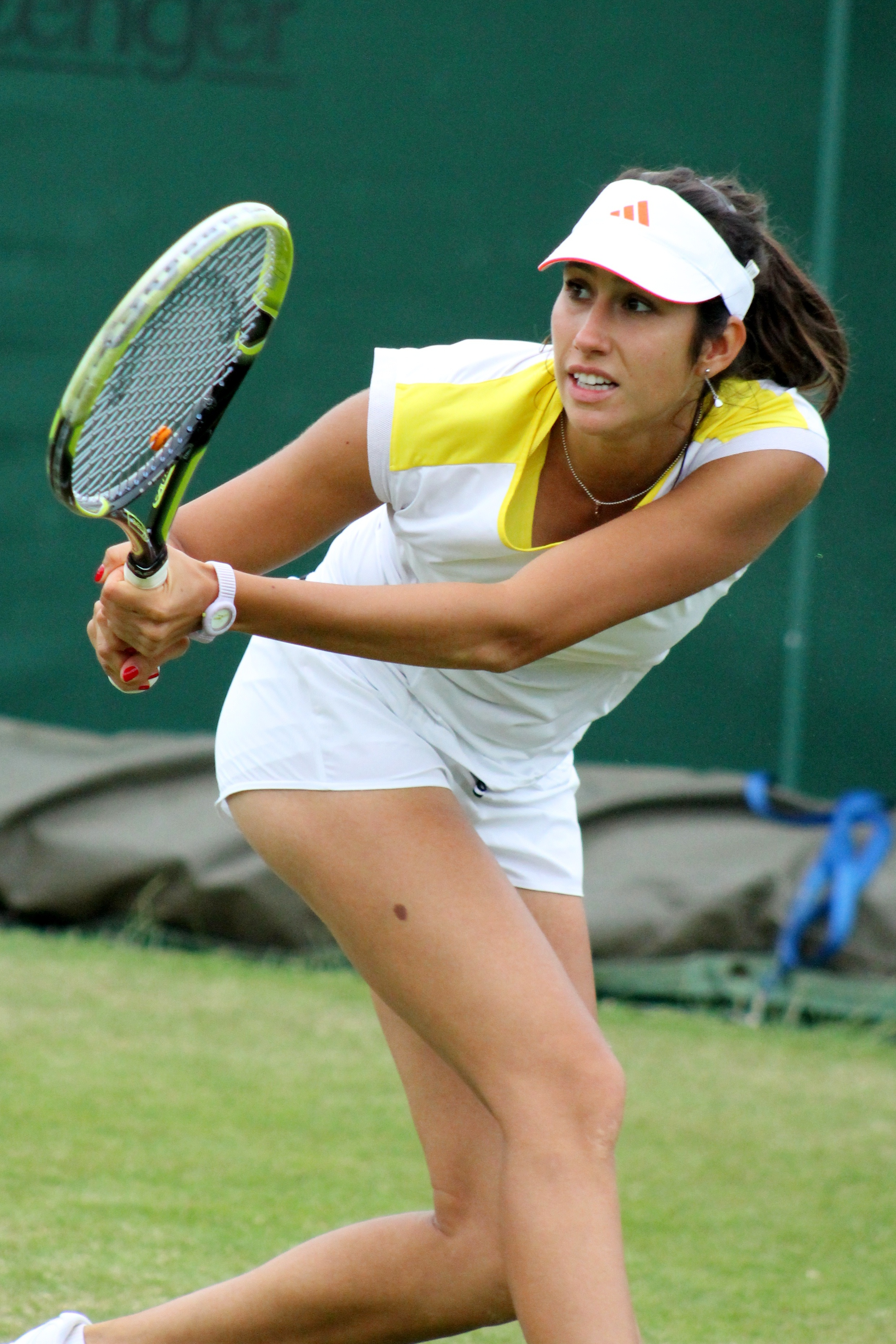
- Burnett at the 2013 Wimbledon qualifying.
- Country (sports): Italy
- Residence: Rome, Italy
- Born: 20 February 1992 (age 33); Rome
- Height: 1.78 m (5 ft 10 in)
- Plays: Right (two-handed backhand)
- Prize money: $306,722

Singles
- Career record: 257–223
- Career titles: 7 ITF
- Highest ranking: No. 121 (3 March 2014)

Grand Slam singles results
- Australian Open: Q2 (2014)
- French Open: Q2 (2012)
- Wimbledon: Q3 (2013)
- US Open: 1R (2012)

Doubles
- Career record: 12–34
- Highest ranking: No. 380 (14 November 2011)

Nastassja Burnett (born 20 February 1992) is an Italian former professional tennis player.

Her father is Scottish and her mother is Polish. On 3 March 2014, she reached her highest singles ranking by the WTA of 121, whilst her best doubles ranking was 380, on 14 November 2011.

== ITF Circuit finals ==
=== Singles: 9 (7 titles, 2 runner-ups) ===
Legend $50,000 tournaments $25,000 tournaments $15,000 tournaments $10,000 tournaments	Finals by surface Hard (1–0) Clay (6–2) Grass (0–0) Carpet (0–0)

Result	No.	Date	Tournament	Surface	Opponent	Score
Win	1.	20 March 2011	ITF Amiens, France	Clay	(Poland) Paula Kania	2–6, 6–1, 6–4
Win	2.	1 August 2011	ITS Cup, Czech Republic	Clay	(Czech Republic) Eva Birnerová	6–1, 6–3
Win	3.	8 August 2011	ITF Monteroni, Italy	Clay	(Italy) Anna-Giulia Remondina	6–3, 7–6^{(7)}
Win	4.	2 October 2011	ITF Madrid, Spain	Clay	(Argentina) Paula Ormaechea	6–2, 6–3
Win	5.	19 April 2015	ITF Pula, Italy	Clay	(Italy) Alice Balducci	6–2, 6–2
Win	6.	24 April 2016	ITF Heraklion, Greece	Hard	(Latvia) Diāna Marcinkēviča	6–4, 7–6^{(4)}
Loss	1.	27 May 2018	ITF Hammamet, Tunisia	Clay	(Italy) Angelica Moratelli	3–6, 3–6
Win	7.	28 July 2018	ITF Schio, Italy	Clay	(Italy) Bianca Turati	6–1, 7–5
Loss	2.	4 August 2018	ITF Biella, Italy	Clay	(Italy) Bianca Turati	4–6, 3–6
