= 2014 BNP Paribas Open =

- Date: March 3–16
- Edition: 41st (ATP) / 26th (WTA)
- Category: Masters 1000 (ATP); Premier Mandatory (WTA)
- Draw: 96S / 32D
- Prize money: $6,120,968 (ATP) $5,946,740 (WTA)
- Surface: Hard / outdoor
- Location: Indian Wells, California, United States
- Venue: Indian Wells Tennis Garden

Champions

Men's singles
- (Serbia) Novak Djokovic

Women's singles
- (Italy) Flavia Pennetta

Men's doubles
- (United States) Bob Bryan / (United States) Mike Bryan

Women's doubles
- (Chinese Taipei) Hsieh Su-wei / (China) Peng Shuai
← 2013 ·	Indian Wells Open	· 2015 →

The 2014 BNP Paribas Open (also known as the 2014 Indian Wells Masters) was a professional tennis tournament that was played at Indian Wells, California, in March 2014. It was the 41st edition of the men's event (26th for the women), known as the BNP Paribas Open, and was classified as an ATP World Tour Masters 1000 event on the 2014 ATP World Tour and a Premier Mandatory event on the 2014 WTA Tour. Both the men's and the women's events took place at the Indian Wells Tennis Garden in Indian Wells, United States, from March 3 through March 16, 2014, on outdoor hard courts.

== Finals ==
=== Men's singles ===
- (Serbia) Novak Djokovic defeated (Switzerland) Roger Federer 3–6, 6–3, 7–6^{(7–3)}

=== Women's singles ===
- (Italy) Flavia Pennetta defeated (Poland) Agnieszka Radwańska, 6–2, 6–1

=== Men's doubles ===
- (United States) Bob Bryan / (United States) Mike Bryan defeated (Austria) Alexander Peya / (Brazil) Bruno Soares, 6–4, 6–3

=== Women's doubles ===
- (Chinese Taipei) Hsieh Su-wei / (China) Peng Shuai defeated (Zimbabwe) Cara Black / (India) Sania Mirza, 7–6^{(7–5)}, 6–2

== Points and prize money ==
=== Point distribution ===
Event	W	F	SF	QF	Round of 16	Round of 32	Round of 64	Round of 128	Q	Q2	Q1
Men's singles	1000	600	360	180	90	45	25*	10	16	8	0
Men's doubles	1000	600	360	180	90	0	—	—	—	—	—
Women's singles	1000	650	390	215	120	65	35*	10	30	20	2
Women's doubles	1000	650	390	215	120	10	—	—	—	—	—

- Players with byes receive first-round points.

=== Prize money ===
The 2014 BNP Paribas Open will feature a significant increase in prize money from the previous year, with all players competing for a share of $6,169,040. All prize money is in US Dollars.

Event	W	p	SF	QF	Round of 16	Round of 32	Round of 64	Round of 128	Q2	Q1
Men's singles	$1,000,000	$500,000	$225,000	$104,000	$52,000	$28,000	$16,000	$11,000	$2,800	$1,400
Women's singles	$1,000,000	$500,000	$225,000	$104,000	$52,000	$28,000	$16,000	$11,000	$2,800	$1,400
Men's doubles	$258,000	$126,000	$63,100	$32,220	$17,000	$9,100	—	—	—	—
Women's doubles	$258,000	$126,000	$63,100	$32,220	$17,000	$9,100	—	—	—	—

== Players ==
=== Men's singles ===
==== Seeds ====
The following are the seeded players. Rankings and seedings are according to ATP rankings on March 3, 2014.

Seed	Rank	Player	Points before	Points defending	Points won	Points after	Status
1	1	(Spain) Rafael Nadal	14,085	1,000	45	13,130	Third round lost to (Ukraine) Alexandr Dolgopolov [28]
2	2	(Serbia) Novak Djokovic	10,260	360	1000	10,900	Final def. (Switzerland) Roger Federer [7]
3	3	(Switzerland) Stanislas Wawrinka	5,650	90	90	5,650	Fourth round lost to (South Africa) Kevin Anderson [17]
4	5	(Czech Republic) Tomáš Berdych	4,890	360	10	4,540	Second round lost to (Spain) Roberto Bautista Agut
5	6	(United Kingdom) Andy Murray	4,885	180	90	4,795	Fourth round lost to (Canada) Milos Raonic [10]
6	7	(Argentina) Juan Martín del Potro	4,870	600	0	4,270	Withdrew prior to second round match
7	8	(Switzerland) Roger Federer	4,625	180	600	5,045	Final lost to (Serbia) Novak Djokovic [2]
8	9	(France) Richard Gasquet	2,950	90	45	2,905	Third round lost to (Spain) Fernando Verdasco [30]
9	10	(France) Jo-Wilfried Tsonga	2,785	180	10	2,615	Second round lost to (France) Julien Benneteau
10	11	(Canada) Milos Raonic	2,485	90	180	2,575	Quarterfinals lost to (Ukraine) Alexandr Dolgopolov [28]
11	12	(Germany) Tommy Haas	2,435	90	90	2,435	Fourth round lost to (Switzerland) Roger Federer [7]
12	13	(United States) John Isner	2,320	10	360	2,670	Semifinals lost to (Serbia) Novak Djokovic [2]
13	14	(Italy) Fabio Fognini	2,230	25	90	2,295	Fourth round lost to (Ukraine) Alexandr Dolgopolov
14	15	(Russia) Mikhail Youzhny	2,145	10	0	2,135	Withdrew prior to second round match
15	16	(Bulgaria) Grigor Dimitrov	2,130	45	45	2,130	Third round lost to (Latvia) Ernests Gulbis [20]
16	17	(Spain) Tommy Robredo	2,005	0	45	2,050	Third round lost to (Croatia) Marin Čilić [24]
17	18	(South Africa) Kevin Anderson	1,940	180	180	1,940	Quarterfinals lost to (Switzerland) Roger Federer [7]
18	20	(Poland) Jerzy Janowicz	1,750	45	10	1,715	Second round lost to (Colombia) Alejandro Falla
19	21	(Japan) Kei Nishikori	1,715	45	45	1,715	Third round lost to (Germany) Tommy Haas [11]
20	22	(Latvia) Ernests Gulbis	1,616	106	180	1,690	Quarterfinals lost to (United States) John Isner [12]
21	23	(France) Gilles Simon	1,565	90	10	1,485	Second round lost to (Austria) Dominic Thiem [Q]
22	24	(Germany) Philipp Kohlschreiber	1,510	10	10	1,510	Second round lost to (Chinese Taipei) Lu Yen-hsun
23	25	(France) Gaël Monfils	1,475	0	45	1,520	Third round lost to (Italy) Fabio Fognini [13]
24	26	(Croatia) Marin Čilić	1,455	45	90	1,500	Fourth round lost to (Serbia) Novak Djokovic [2]
25	27	(Canada) Vasek Pospisil	1,359	26	10	1,343	Second round lost to (Kazakhstan) Mikhail Kukushkin
26	29	(Germany) Florian Mayer	1,245	45	10	1,210	Second round retired against (Finland) Jarkko Nieminen
27	30	(Russia) Dmitry Tursunov	1,212	26	45	1,231	Third round lost to (Switzerland) Roger Federer [7]
28	31	(Ukraine) Alexandr Dolgopolov	1,205	10	360	1,555	Semifinals lost to (Switzerland) Roger Federer [7]
29	32	(Italy) Andreas Seppi	1,195	45	45	1,195	Third round lost to (Switzerland) Stanislas Wawrinka [3]
30	33	(Spain) Fernando Verdasco	1,190	10	90	1,270	Fourth round lost to (United States) John Isner [12]
31	34	(Croatia) Ivan Dodig	1,145	45	10	1,110	Second round lost to (Colombia) Alejandro González
32	35	(Spain) Pablo Andújar	1,141	25	10	1,126	Second round lost to (Czech Republic) Jiří Veselý

==== Withdrawn players ====
Rank	Player	Points Before	Points defending	Points won	Points after	Withdrew due to
4	(Spain) David Ferrer	5,160	10	0	5,150	Adductor injury
19	(Spain) Nicolás Almagro	1,840	45	0	1,795	Shoulder injury
28	(France) Benoît Paire	1,275	45	0	1,230	Knee injury

==== Other entrants ====
The following players received wildcards into the singles main draw:

- (United States) Ryan Harrison
- (United States) Steve Johnson
- (United States) Rajeev Ram
- (United States) Jack Sock
- (United States) Rhyne Williams

The following players received entry from the qualifying draw:

- (United States) Robby Ginepri
- (Australia) Samuel Groth
- (United States) Daniel Kosakowski
- (United States) Alex Kuznetsov
- (Serbia) Dušan Lajović
- (Italy) Paolo Lorenzi
- (France) Paul-Henri Mathieu
- (Spain) Daniel Muñoz de la Nava
- (Canada) Peter Polansky
- (France) Stéphane Robert
- (Australia) John-Patrick Smith
- (Austria) Dominic Thiem

The following players received entry as lucky losers:

- (Belgium) David Goffin
- (Russia) Evgeny Donskoy
- (United Kingdom) James Ward

==== Withdrawals ====
Before the tournament

- (Spain) Nicolás Almagro → replaced by (Ukraine) Sergiy Stakhovsky
- (United States) Brian Baker → replaced by (Germany) Benjamin Becker
- (Argentina) Carlos Berlocq → replaced by (Russia) Teymuraz Gabashvili
- (Argentina) Juan Martín del Potro (wrist injury) → replaced by (United Kingdom) James Ward
- (Spain) David Ferrer → replaced by (Colombia) Alejandro Falla
- (Spain) Guillermo García López → replaced by (United States) Donald Young
- (Spain) Marcel Granollers → replaced by (Russia) Alex Bogomolov Jr.
- (Austria) Jürgen Melzer (shoulder injury) → replaced by (Kazakhstan) Andrey Golubev
- (Spain) Albert Montañés → replaced by (United States) Tim Smyczek
- (France) Benoît Paire → replaced by (United States) Bradley Klahn
- (Poland) Michał Przysiężny → replaced by (Belgium) David Goffin
- (Serbia) Janko Tipsarević (foot injury) → replaced by (Czech Republic) Jiří Veselý
- (Australia) Bernard Tomic (hip injury) → replaced by (United States) Michael Russell
- (Italy) Filippo Volandri → replaced by (Kazakhstan) Aleksandr Nedovyesov
- (Russia) Mikhail Youzhny (back injury) → replaced by (Russia) Evgeny Donskoy

==== Retirements ====
- (Russia) Teymuraz Gabashvili
- (Germany) Florian Mayer

=== Men's doubles ===
==== Seeds ====
Country	Player	Country	Player	Rank^{1}	Seed
USA	Bob Bryan	USA	Mike Bryan	2	1
AUT	Alexander Peya	BRA	Bruno Soares	6	2
CRO	Ivan Dodig	BRA	Marcelo Melo	11	3
IND	Leander Paes	CZE	Radek Štěpánek	18	4
ESP	David Marrero	ESP	Fernando Verdasco	18	5
IND	Rohan Bopanna	PAK	Aisam-ul-Haq Qureshi	26	6
CAN	Daniel Nestor	SRB	Nenad Zimonjić	28	7
POL	Łukasz Kubot	SWE	Robert Lindstedt	38	8

- ^{1} Rankings as of March 3, 2014.

==== Other entrants ====
The following pairs received wildcards into the doubles main draw:

- (Serbia) Novak Djokovic / (Serbia) Filip Krajinović
- (Israel) Jonathan Erlich / (France) Richard Gasquet

=== Women's singles ===
==== Seeds ====
The following are the seeded players. Rankings and seedings are according to WTA rankings on February 24, 2014. Points before are as of March 3, 2014.

Seed	Rank	Player	Points before	Points defending	Points won	Points after	Status
1	2	(China) Li Na	6,795	0	390	7,185	Semifinals lost to (Italy) Flavia Pennetta [20]
2	3	(Poland) Agnieszka Radwańska	5,705	140	650	6,215	Final lost to (Italy) Flavia Pennetta [20]
3	4	(Belarus) Victoria Azarenka	5,681	250	10	5,441	Second round lost to (United States) Lauren Davis
4	5	(Russia) Maria Sharapova	5,206	1,000	65	4,271	Third round lost to (Italy) Camila Giorgi [Q]
5	6	(Germany) Angelique Kerber	4,490	450	10	4,050	Second round lost to (Spain) María Teresa Torró Flor
6	7	(Romania) Simona Halep	4,435	50	390	4,775	Semifinals lost to (Poland) Agnieszka Radwańska [2]
7	8	(Serbia) Jelena Janković	4,380	5	215	4,590	Quarterfinals lost to (Poland) Agnieszka Radwańska [2]
8	9	(Czech Republic) Petra Kvitová	4,365	250	120	4,235	Fourth round lost to (Slovakia) Dominika Cibulková [12]
9	10	(Italy) Sara Errani	4,015	250	65	3,830	Third round lost to (Canada) Eugenie Bouchard [18]
10	11	(Denmark) Caroline Wozniacki	3,185	700	120	2,605	Fourth round lost to (Serbia) Jelena Janković [7]
11	12	(Serbia) Ana Ivanovic	3,155	80	65	3,140	Third round lost to (United States) Sloane Stephens [17]
12	13	(Slovakia) Dominika Cibulková	3,335	80	215	3,470	Quarterfinals lost to (China) Li Na [1]
13	14	(Italy) Roberta Vinci	2,940	80	65	2,925	Third round lost to (Australia) Casey Dellacqua [Q]
14	15	(Spain) Carla Suárez Navarro	2,635	80	65	2,620	Third round lost to (France) Alizé Cornet [22]
15	16	(Germany) Sabine Lisicki	2,650	0	10	2,660	Second round lost to (Canada) Aleksandra Wozniak [PR]
16	17	(Australia) Samantha Stosur	2,605	250	65	2,420	Third round lost to (Italy) Flavia Pennetta [20]
17	18	(United States) Sloane Stephens	2,415	5	215	2,625	Quarterfinals lost to (Italy) Flavia Pennetta [20]
18	19	(Canada) Eugenie Bouchard	2,379	(14)	120	2,485	Fourth round lost to (Romania) Simona Halep [6]
19	20	(Belgium) Kirsten Flipkens	2,285	80	10	2,215	Second round lost to (Australia) Casey Dellacqua [Q]
20	21	(Italy) Flavia Pennetta	2,260	5	1000	3,255	Final def. (Poland) Agnieszka Radwańska [2]
21	22	(Russia) Anastasia Pavlyuchenkova	2,180	5	65	2,240	Third round lost to (Canada) Aleksandra Wozniak [PR]
22	23	(France) Alizé Cornet	2,160	50	120	2,230	Fourth round lost to (Poland) Agnieszka Radwańska [2]
23	24	(Russia) Ekaterina Makarova	2,065	5	65	2,125	Third round lost to (Slovakia) Dominika Cibulková [12]
24	26	(Estonia) Kaia Kanepi	2,035	0	10	2,045	Second round lost to (Kazakhstan) Yaroslava Shvedova [Q]
25	27	(Romania) Sorana Cîrstea	1,980	80	10	1,910	Second round lost to (Italy) Camila Giorgi [Q]
26	28	(Czech Republic) Lucie Šafářová	1,820	5	65	1,880	Third round lost to (Romania) Simona Halep [6]
27	30	(Russia) Svetlana Kuznetsova	1,598	80	65	1,583	Third round lost to (Czech Republic) Petra Kvitová [8]
28	32	(Czech Republic) Klára Zakopalová	1,745	140	10	1,615	Second round lost to (Czech Republic) Karolína Plíšková
29	33	(Slovakia) Daniela Hantuchová	1,482	50	10	1,442	Second round lost to (United States) Varvara Lepchenko
30	34	(Russia) Elena Vesnina	1,465	80	10	1,395	Second round lost to (Germany) Annika Beck
31	35	(Slovakia) Magdaléna Rybáriková	1,385	80	65	1,370	Third round lost to (Serbia) Jelena Janković [7]
32	36	(Spain) Garbiñe Muguruza	1,563	170	10	1,403	Second round lost to (Russia) Alisa Kleybanova [PR]

==== Withdrawn players ====
Rank	Player	Points Before	Points defending	Points won	Points after	Withdrew due to
1	(United States) Serena Williams	12,660	0	0	12,660	Boycott
25	(Russia) Maria Kirilenko	2,046	450	0	1,596	Knee injury
29	(United States) Venus Williams	1,577	0	0	1,577	Boycott
31	(United States) Jamie Hampton	1,532	80	0	1,452	Hip Injury

==== Other entrants ====
The following players received wildcards into the singles main draw:

- (Switzerland) Belinda Bencic
- (United States) Victoria Duval
- (Russia) Nadia Petrova
- (United States) Shelby Rogers
- (United States) Taylor Townsend
- (United States) CoCo Vandeweghe
- (Croatia) Donna Vekić
- (Russia) Vera Zvonareva

The following players used protected ranking to gain entry into the singles main draw:

- (Czech Republic) Petra Cetkovská
- (Russia) Alisa Kleybanova
- (Czech Republic) Iveta Melzer
- (Canada) Aleksandra Wozniak

The following players received entry from the qualifying draw:

- (Chinese Taipei) Chan Yung-jan
- (Australia) Casey Dellacqua
- (Canada) Sharon Fichman
- (Italy) Camila Giorgi
- (United States) Allie Kiick
- (Portugal) Michelle Larcher de Brito
- (Australia) Olivia Rogowska
- (Slovakia) Anna Schmiedlová
- (Kazakhstan) Yaroslava Shvedova
- (Belgium) Alison Van Uytvanck
- (United Kingdom) Heather Watson
- (Czech Republic) Barbora Záhlavová-Strýcová

==== Withdrawals ====
Before the tournament

- (United States) Jamie Hampton → replaced by (Germany) Julia Görges
- (Slovenia) Polona Hercog → replaced by (South Africa) Chanelle Scheepers
- (Russia) Maria Kirilenko → replaced by (Israel) Shahar Pe'er
- (Japan) Ayumi Morita → replaced by (Spain) Sílvia Soler Espinosa
- (United Kingdom) Laura Robson (wrist injury) → replaced by (Kazakhstan) Galina Voskoboeva
- (United States) Serena Williams (continued boycott of the event since 2001) → replaced by (France) Caroline Garcia
- (United States) Venus Williams (continued boycott of the event since 2001) → replaced by (Japan) Kurumi Nara

During the tournament

- (United States) Lauren Davis (stomach virus)

==== Retirements ====
- (Russia) Nadia Petrova (lower right leg injury)
- (Kazakhstan) Galina Voskoboeva (upper respiratory infection)

=== Women's doubles ===
==== Seeds ====
Country	Player	Country	Player	Rank^{1}	Seed
TPE	Hsieh Su-wei	CHN	Peng Shuai	3	1
RUS	Ekaterina Makarova	RUS	Elena Vesnina	7	2
ITA	Sara Errani	ITA	Roberta Vinci	12	3
CZE	Květa Peschke	SLO	Katarina Srebotnik	14	4
ZIM	Cara Black	IND	Sania Mirza	24	5
CZE	Andrea Hlaváčková	CZE	Lucie Šafářová	25	6
AUS	Ashleigh Barty	AUS	Casey Dellacqua	34	7
CZE	Lucie Hradecká	CHN	Zheng Jie	37	8

- ^{1} Rankings as of February 24, 2014.

==== Other entrants ====
The following pairs received wildcards into the doubles main draw:

- (Switzerland) Martina Hingis / (Germany) Sabine Lisicki
- (United States) Madison Keys / (United States) Alison Riske
- (Russia) Svetlana Kuznetsova / (Australia) Samantha Stosur
- (Germany) Andrea Petkovic / (United States) Sloane Stephens

The following pairs received entry as alternates:

- (Canada) Sharon Fichman / (United States) Megan Moulton-Levy
- (Poland) Alicja Rosolska / (Spain) Sílvia Soler Espinosa

==== Withdrawals ====
Before the tournament

- (Russia) Nadia Petrova (lower right leg injury)
- (China) Zhang Shuai (right shoulder injury)
