= 2013 BNP Paribas Open – Women's doubles =

Women's doubles
- 2013 BNP Paribas Open

Final
- Champions: (Russia) Ekaterina Makarova (Russia) Elena Vesnina
- Runners-up: (Russia) Nadia Petrova (Slovenia) Katarina Srebotnik
- Score: 6–0, 5–7, [10–6]

Events
Singles	men	women
Doubles	men	women
← 2012 ·	BNP Paribas Open	· 2014 →

Liezel Huber and Lisa Raymond were the defending champions but chose not to play together. Huber partnered up with María José Martínez Sánchez, but lost in the first round to Daniela Hantuchová and Anabel Medina Garrigues, whilst Raymond played alongside Samantha Stosur, but lost in the second round to Kimiko Date-Krumm and Casey Dellacqua.

Ekaterina Makarova and Elena Vesnina won the title, defeating Nadia Petrova and Katarina Srebotnik 6–0, 5–7, [10–6] in the final.

== Seeds ==
1. (Italy) Sara Errani / (Italy) Roberta Vinci (second round)
2. (Czech Republic) Andrea Hlaváčková / (Czech Republic) Lucie Hradecká (second round)
3. (Russia) Nadia Petrova / (Slovenia) Katarina Srebotnik (final)
4. (Russia) Ekaterina Makarova / (Russia) Elena Vesnina (champions)
5. (United States) Liezel Huber / (Spain) María José Martínez Sánchez (first round)
6. (Spain) Nuria Llagostera Vives / (China) Zheng Jie (quarterfinals)
7. (United States) Raquel Kops-Jones / (United States) Abigail Spears (first round)
8. (United States) Bethanie Mattek-Sands / (India) Sania Mirza (first round)

== Draw ==
=== Key ===
- Q = Qualifier
- WC = Wild card
- LL = Lucky loser
- Alt = Alternate
- ITF = ITF entry
- PR = Protected ranking
- SR = Special ranking
- SE = Special exempt
- JE = Junior exempt
- JR = Junior Accelerator Programme entrant
- CO = College Accelerator Programme entrant
- NG = Next Gen Accelerator Program entrant
- w/o = Walkover
- r = Retired
- d = Defaulted

=== Finals ===
Semifinals
(Chinese Taipei) Hsieh Su-wei (China) Peng Shuai	2	2
3	(Russia) Nadia Petrova (Slovenia) Katarina Srebotnik	6	6
4	(Russia) Ekaterina Makarova (Russia) Elena Vesnina	4	7^{7}	[10]
(Japan) Kimiko Date-Krumm (Australia) Casey Dellacqua	6	6^{4}	[8]

Final
3	(Russia) Nadia Petrova (Slovenia) Katarina Srebotnik	0	7	[6]
4	(Russia) Ekaterina Makarova (Russia) Elena Vesnina	6	5	[10]

=== Top half ===
First round
1	(Italy) S Errani (Italy) R Vinci	6	6
(Croatia) D Jurak (Hungary) K Marosi	3	2
WC	(Russia) S Kuznetsova (Italy) F Pennetta	4	6^{4}
(Chinese Taipei) S-w Hsieh (China) S Peng	6	7^{7}
(France) K Mladenovic (Kazakhstan) G Voskoboeva	4	5
(Zimbabwe) C Black (Australia) A Rodionova	6	7
(Slovakia) D Hantuchová (Spain) A Medina Garrigues	7^{7}	1	[10]
5	(United States) L Huber (Spain) MJ Martínez Sánchez	6^{2}	6	[5]
3	(Russia) N Petrova (Slovenia) K Srebotnik	6	4	[10]
(Russia) A Pavlyuchenkova (Czech Republic) L Šafářová	4	6	[5]
WC	(Serbia) J Janković (Croatia) M Lučić-Baroni	6	6
(Czech Republic) E Birnerová (Slovakia) D Cibulková	2	2
(Spain) A Parra Santonja (Italy) F Schiavone	5	6	[3]
(Romania) I-C Begu (Poland) A Rosolska	7	2	[10]
(Luxembourg) M Minella (Czech Republic) R Voráčová	4	4
6	(Spain) N Llagostera Vives (China) J Zheng	6	6

Second round
1	(Italy) S Errani (Italy) R Vinci	2	3
(Chinese Taipei) S-w Hsieh (China) S Peng	6	6
(Zimbabwe) C Black (Australia) A Rodionova	1	3
(Slovakia) D Hantuchová (Spain) A Medina Garrigues	6	6
3	(Russia) N Petrova (Slovenia) K Srebotnik	6	7^{7}
WC	(Serbia) J Janković (Croatia) M Lučić-Baroni	2	6^{4}
(Romania) I-C Begu (Poland) A Rosolska	6^{2}	3
6	(Spain) N Llagostera Vives (China) J Zheng	7^{7}	6

Quarterfinals
(Chinese Taipei) S-w Hsieh (China) S Peng	6	6^{6}	[10]
(Slovakia) D Hantuchová (Spain) A Medina Garrigues	2	7^{8}	[4]
3	(Russia) N Petrova (Slovenia) K Srebotnik	6	6
6	(Spain) N Llagostera Vives (China) J Zheng	1	2

Semifinals
(Chinese Taipei) S-w Hsieh (China) S Peng	2	2
3	(Russia) N Petrova (Slovenia) K Srebotnik	6	6

=== Bottom half ===
First round
7	(United States) R Kops-Jones (United States) A Spears	3	4
(New Zealand) M Erakovic (United Kingdom) H Watson	6	6
(Chinese Taipei) H-c Chan (Slovakia) J Husárová	7^{7}	6^{5}	[10]
WC	(Czech Republic) P Kvitová (Belgium) Y Wickmayer	6^{4}	7^{7}	[6]
(Germany) J Görges (Kazakhstan) Y Shvedova	6	7^{7}
(South Africa) N Grandin (Czech Republic) V Uhlířová	2	6^{1}
(United States) V King (Romania) M Niculescu	5	7^{7}	[6]
4	(Russia) E Makarova (Russia) E Vesnina	7	6^{2}	[10]
8	(United States) B Mattek-Sands (India) S Mirza	7^{10}	3	[6]
(United States) L Raymond (Australia) S Stosur	6^{8}	6	[10]
(Latvia) L Dekmeijere (Belarus) O Govortsova	2	1
(Japan) K Date-Krumm (Australia) C Dellacqua	6	6
(Russia) V Dushevina (Russia) A Panova	6	2	[10]
WC	(Germany) A Kerber (Germany) A Petkovic	4	6	[5]
(United States) V Lepchenko (China) S Zheng	1	2
2	(Czech Republic) A Hlaváčková (Czech Republic) L Hradecká	6	6

Second round
(New Zealand) M Erakovic (United Kingdom) H Watson	6	3	[5]
(Chinese Taipei) H-c Chan (Slovakia) J Husárová	4	6	[10]
(Germany) J Görges (Kazakhstan) Y Shvedova	2	6^{4}
4	(Russia) E Makarova (Russia) E Vesnina	6	7^{7}
(United States) L Raymond (Australia) S Stosur	1	6	[6]
(Japan) K Date-Krumm (Australia) C Dellacqua	6	4	[10]
(Russia) V Dushevina (Russia) A Panova	6	7^{7}
2	(Czech Republic) A Hlaváčková (Czech Republic) L Hradecká	4	6^{4}

Quarterfinals
(Chinese Taipei) H-c Chan (Slovakia) J Husárová	6^{3}	6	[7]
4	(Russia) E Makarova (Russia) E Vesnina	7^{7}	4	[10]
(Japan) K Date-Krumm (Australia) C Dellacqua	6	6
(Russia) V Dushevina (Russia) A Panova	2	4

Semifinals
4	(Russia) E Makarova (Russia) E Vesnina	4	7^{7}	[10]
(Japan) K Date-Krumm (Australia) C Dellacqua	6	6^{4}	[8]
