= 2013 BNP Paribas Open =

- Date: March 7–17
- Edition: 40th (ATP) / 25th (WTA)
- Category: World Tour Masters 1000 (ATP); Premier Mandatory (WTA)
- Draw: 96S / 32D
- Prize money: $5,244,125 $5,185,625
- Surface: Hard
- Location: Indian Wells, California, United States
- Venue: Indian Wells Tennis Garden

Champions

Men's singles
- (Spain) Rafael Nadal

Women's singles
- (Russia) Maria Sharapova

Men's doubles
- (United States) Bob Bryan / (United States) Mike Bryan

Women's doubles
- (Russia) Ekaterina Makarova / (Russia) Elena Vesnina
← 2012 ·	Indian Wells Open	· 2014 →

The 2013 BNP Paribas Open (also known as the Indian Wells Open) was a professional tennis tournament that was played at Indian Wells, California, in March 2013. It was the 40th edition of the men's event (25th for the women), and was classified as an ATP World Tour Masters 1000 event on the 2013 ATP World Tour and a Premier Mandatory event on the 2013 WTA Tour. Both the men's and the women's events took place at the Indian Wells Tennis Garden in Indian Wells, United States, from March 7 through March 17, 2013, and were played on outdoor hard courts.

== Finals ==
=== Men's singles ===
- (Spain) Rafael Nadal defeated (Argentina) Juan Martín del Potro, 4–6, 6–3, 6–4
- This was Nadal's 3rd singles title at Indian Wells and 3rd overall, and it was his 53rd title, a record-breaking 22nd ATP World Tour Masters 1000 title.

=== Women's singles ===
- (Russia) Maria Sharapova defeated (Denmark) Caroline Wozniacki 6–2, 6–2
- This was Sharapova's second Indian Wells title and 28th career title

=== Men's doubles ===
- (United States) Bob Bryan / (United States) Mike Bryan defeated (Philippines) Treat Conrad Huey / (Poland) Jerzy Janowicz 6–3, 3–6, [10–6]

=== Women's doubles ===
- (Russia) Ekaterina Makarova / (Russia) Elena Vesnina defeated (Russia) Nadia Petrova / (Slovenia) Katarina Srebotnik 6–0, 5–7, [10–6]

== Points and prize money ==
=== Point distribution ===
Event	W	F	SF	QF	Round of 16	Round of 32	Round of 64	Round of 128	Q	Q2	Q1
Men's singles	1000	600	360	180	90	45	25	10	16	8	0
Men's doubles	1000	600	360	180	90	45	0	—	—	—	—
Women's singles	1000	700	450	250	140	80	50	5	30	20	1
Women's doubles	1000	700	450	250	140	80	5	—	—	—	—

=== Prize money ===
The tournament featured a significant increase in prize money from the previous year, with all players competing for a share of $5,244,125 (USD).

Event	W	F	SF	QF	Round of 16	Round of 32	Round of 64	Round of 128	Q2	Q1
Men's singles	$1,000,000	$500,000	$225,000	$104,000	$52,000	$26,000	$16,000	$11,000	$2,515	$1,285
Women's singles	$1,000,000	$500,000	$225,000	$104,000	$52,000	$26,000	$16,000	$11,000	$2,515	$1,285
Men's doubles	$245,000	$125,492	$63,220	$32,220	$16,993	$9,102	—	—	—	—
Women's doubles	$245,000	$125,492	$63,220	$32,220	$16,993	$9,102	—	—	—	—

== Players ==
=== Men's singles ===
==== Seeds ====
Country	Player	Rank^{1}	Seed
SRB	Novak Djokovic	1	1
SUI	Roger Federer	2	2
GBR	Andy Murray	3	3
ESP	David Ferrer	4	4
ESP	Rafael Nadal	5	5
CZE	Tomáš Berdych	6	6
ARG	Juan Martín del Potro	7	7
FRA	Jo-Wilfried Tsonga	8	8
SRB	Janko Tipsarević	9	9
FRA	Richard Gasquet	10	10
ESP	Nicolás Almagro	11	11
CRO	Marin Čilić	12	12
FRA	Gilles Simon	13	13
ARG	Juan Mónaco	14	14
USA	John Isner	15	15
JPN	Kei Nishikori	16	16
CAN	Milos Raonic	17	17
SUI	Stanislas Wawrinka	18	18
GER	Tommy Haas	19	19
ITA	Andreas Seppi	20	20
GER	Philipp Kohlschreiber	21	21
UKR	Alexandr Dolgopolov	22	22
USA	Sam Querrey	23	23
POL	Jerzy Janowicz	24	24
FRA	Jérémy Chardy	25	25
SVK	Martin Kližan	26	26
GER	Florian Mayer	27	27
FRA	Julien Benneteau	28	28
ESP	Fernando Verdasco	29	29
RUS	Mikhail Youzhny	30	30
BUL	Grigor Dimitrov	31	31
USA	Mardy Fish	32	32

- ^{1} Rankings are as of March 4, 2013.

==== Other entrants ====
The following players got wildcards into the singles main draw:

- (United States) James Blake
- (United States) Steve Johnson
- (Spain) Tommy Robredo
- (United States) Tim Smyczek
- (United States) Jack Sock

The following players received entry from the qualifying draw:

- (Germany) Daniel Brands
- (Australia) Matthew Ebden
- (Latvia) Ernests Gulbis
- (Croatia) Ivo Karlović
- (Spain) Daniel Muñoz de la Nava
- (United States) Wayne Odesnik
- (Argentina) Guido Pella
- (Germany) Philipp Petzschner
- (Canada) Vasek Pospisil
- (United States) Bobby Reynolds
- (Russia) Dmitry Tursunov
- (Germany) Mischa Zverev

==== Withdrawals ====
Before the tournament

- (United States) Brian Baker → replaced by (Australia) Lleyton Hewitt
- (United States) Andy Roddick → replaced by (Russia) Evgeny Donskoy
- (Czech Republic) Radek Štěpánek → replaced by (Japan) Tatsuma Ito
- (Slovenia) Grega Žemlja → replaced by (Argentina) David Nalbandian

During the tournament

- (France) Michaël Llodra (hip injury)
- (Argentina) Leonardo Mayer (back injury)

=== Men's doubles ===
==== Seeds ====
Country	Player	Country	Player	Rank^{1}	Seed
USA	Bob Bryan	USA	Mike Bryan	2	1
ESP	Marcel Granollers	ESP	Marc López	7	2
IND	Mahesh Bhupathi	CAN	Daniel Nestor	16	3
BLR	Max Mirnyi	ROU	Horia Tecău	16	4
SWE	Robert Lindstedt	SRB	Nenad Zimonjić	27	5
PAK	Aisam-ul-Haq Qureshi	NED	Jean-Julien Rojer	27	6
AUT	Jürgen Melzer	IND	Leander Paes	36	7
POL	Mariusz Fyrstenberg	POL	Marcin Matkowski	37	8

- ^{1} Rankings as of March 4, 2013.

==== Other entrants ====
The following pairs received wildcards into the doubles main draw:

- (United States) James Blake / (United States) Mardy Fish
- (United Kingdom) Andy Murray / (United Kingdom) Jamie Murray

==== Withdrawals ====
Before the tournament

- (Cyprus) Marcos Baghdatis (shoulder injury)
- (Brazil) Thomaz Bellucci (shoulder injury)
- (India) Leander Paes (flu)
- (Romania) Horia Tecău (calf injury)

=== Women's singles ===
==== Seeds ====
Country	Player	Rank^{1}	Seed
BLR	Victoria Azarenka	2	1
RUS	Maria Sharapova	3	2
POL	Agnieszka Radwańska	4	3
GER	Angelique Kerber	6	4
CZE	Petra Kvitová	7	5
ITA	Sara Errani	8	6
AUS	Samantha Stosur	9	7
DEN	Caroline Wozniacki	10	8
FRA	Marion Bartoli	11	9
RUS	Nadia Petrova	12	10
SRB	Ana Ivanovic	13	11
SVK	Dominika Cibulková	14	12
RUS	Maria Kirilenko	15	13
ITA	Roberta Vinci	16	14
USA	Sloane Stephens	17	15
CZE	Lucie Šafářová	18	16
RUS	Ekaterina Makarova	19	17
SRB	Jelena Janković	21	18
CZE	Klára Zakopalová	22	19
TPE	Hsieh Su-wei	23	20
GER	Julia Görges	24	21
USA	Varvara Lepchenko	25	22
AUT	Tamira Paszek	26	23
GER	Mona Barthel	27	24
ESP	Carla Suárez Navarro	28	25
RUS	Anastasia Pavlyuchenkova	29	26
ROU	Sorana Cîrstea	30	27
BEL	Kirsten Flipkens	31	28
RUS	Elena Vesnina	32	29
BEL	Yanina Wickmayer	33	30
KAZ	Yaroslava Shvedova	34	31
CHN	Peng Shuai	35	32

- ^{1} Rankings are as of February 25, 2013.

==== Other entrants ====
The following players got wildcards into the singles main draw:

- (United States) Jill Craybas
- (Japan) Kimiko Date-Krumm
- (United States) Madison Keys
- (United States) Bethanie Mattek-Sands
- (France) Kristina Mladenovic
- (Israel) Shahar Pe'er
- (United States) Maria Sanchez
- (United States) Taylor Townsend

The following player received entry using a protected ranking into the singles main draw:

- (Romania) Alexandra Dulgheru

The following players received entry from the qualifying draw:

- (United States) Mallory Burdette
- (Australia) Casey Dellacqua
- (France) Stéphanie Foretz Gacon
- (Kazakhstan) Sesil Karatantcheva
- (Portugal) Michelle Larcher de Brito
- (Croatia) Mirjana Lučić-Baroni
- (United States) Grace Min
- (Spain) Garbiñe Muguruza
- (Russia) Olga Puchkova
- (Puerto Rico) Monica Puig
- (Ukraine) Elina Svitolina
- (Ukraine) Lesia Tsurenko

The following player received entry as a lucky loser:

- (Switzerland) Stefanie Vögele

==== Withdrawals ====
Before the tournament

- (Czech Republic) Petra Cetkovská → replaced by (United States) Lauren Davis
- (Italy) Camila Giorgi (right shoulder injury) → (Switzerland) replaced by Stefanie Vögele
- (Estonia) Kaia Kanepi → replaced by (Slovenia) Polona Hercog
- (China) Li Na (left ankle injury) → replaced by (Kazakhstan) Ksenia Pervak
- (Germany) Sabine Lisicki → replaced by (United States) Melanie Oudin
- (Georgia (country)) Anna Tatishvili → replaced by (Spain) Sílvia Soler Espinosa
- (United States) Serena Williams (continued boycott of the event since 2001) → replaced by (Luxembourg) Mandy Minella
- (United States) Venus Williams (continued boycott of the event since 2001) → replaced by (Spain) Lara Arruabarrena
- (Canada) Aleksandra Wozniak → replaced by (Romania) Alexandra Dulgheru

During the tournament

- (Belarus) Victoria Azarenka (right ankle injury)
- (Australia) Samantha Stosur (right calf injury)

=== Women's doubles ===
==== Seeds ====
Country	Player	Country	Player	Rank^{1}	Seed
ITA	Sara Errani	ITA	Roberta Vinci	2	1
CZE	Andrea Hlaváčková	CZE	Lucie Hradecká	9	2
RUS	Nadia Petrova	SLO	Katarina Srebotnik	15	3
RUS	Ekaterina Makarova	RUS	Elena Vesnina	15	4
USA	Liezel Huber	ESP	María José Martínez Sánchez	24	5
ESP	Nuria Llagostera Vives	CHN	Zheng Jie	27	6
USA	Raquel Kops-Jones	USA	Abigail Spears	31	7
USA	Bethanie Mattek-Sands	IND	Sania Mirza	35	8

- ^{1} Rankings as of February 25, 2013.

==== Other entrants ====
The following pairs received wildcards into the doubles main draw:

- (Serbia) Jelena Janković / (Croatia) Mirjana Lučić-Baroni
- (Germany) Angelique Kerber / (Germany) Andrea Petkovic
- (Russia) Svetlana Kuznetsova / (Italy) Flavia Pennetta
- (Czech Republic) Petra Kvitová / (Belgium) Yanina Wickmayer
