= 2014 BNP Paribas Open – Men's singles =

Men's singles
- 2014 BNP Paribas Open

Final
- Champion: (Serbia) Novak Djokovic
- Runner-up: (Switzerland) Roger Federer
- Score: 3–6, 6–3, 7–6^{(7–3)}

Details
- Draw: 96
- Seeds: 32

Events
Singles	men	women
Doubles	men	women
- Indian Wells Masters

Novak Djokovic defeated Roger Federer in the final, 3–6, 6–3, 7–6^{(7–3)} to win the men's singles tennis title at the 2014 Indian Wells Masters. It was his third Indian Wells title.

Rafael Nadal was the defending champion, but lost in the third round to Alexandr Dolgopolov.

== Seeds ==
All seeds receive a bye into the second round.

1. (Spain) Rafael Nadal (third round)
2. (Serbia) Novak Djokovic (champion)
3. (Switzerland) Stanislas Wawrinka (fourth round)
4. (Czech Republic) Tomáš Berdych (second round)
5. (United Kingdom) Andy Murray (fourth round)
6. (Argentina) ~~Juan Martín del Potro~~ (withdrew because of a wrist injury)^{[a]}
7. (Switzerland) Roger Federer (final)
8. (France) Richard Gasquet (third round)
9. (France) Jo-Wilfried Tsonga (second round)
10. (Canada) Milos Raonic (quarterfinals)
11. (Germany) Tommy Haas (fourth round)
12. (United States) John Isner (semifinals)
13. (Italy) Fabio Fognini (fourth round)
14. (Russia) ~~Mikhail Youzhny~~ (withdrew because of a back injury)^{[b]}
15. (Bulgaria) Grigor Dimitrov (third round)
16. (Spain) Tommy Robredo (third round)
17. (South Africa) Kevin Anderson (quarterfinals)
18. (Poland) Jerzy Janowicz (second round)
19. (Japan) Kei Nishikori (third round)
20. (Latvia) Ernests Gulbis (quarterfinals)
21. (France) Gilles Simon (second round)
22. (Germany) Philipp Kohlschreiber (second round)
23. (France) Gaël Monfils (third round)
24. (Croatia) Marin Čilić (fourth round)
25. (Canada) Vasek Pospisil (second round)
26. (Germany) Florian Mayer (second round, retired because of a leg injury)^{[c]}
27. (Russia) Dmitry Tursunov (third round)
28. (Ukraine) Alexandr Dolgopolov (semifinals)
29. (Italy) Andreas Seppi (third round)
30. (Spain) Fernando Verdasco (fourth round)
31. (Croatia) Ivan Dodig (second round)
32. (Spain) Pablo Andújar (second round)

Click on the seed number of a player to go to their draw section.

== Draw ==
Key

- Q = Qualifier
- WC = Wild card
- LL = Lucky loser
- Alt = Alternate
- ITF = ITF entry
- PR = Protected ranking
- SR = Special ranking
- SE = Special exempt
- JE = Junior exempt
- JR = Junior Accelerator Programme entrant
- CO = College Accelerator Programme entrant
- NG = Next Gen Accelerator Program entrant
- w/o = Walkover
- r = Retired
- d = Defaulted

=== Finals ===
Quarterfinals
28	(Ukraine) Alexandr Dolgopolov	6	6
10	(Canada) Milos Raonic	3	4
17	(South Africa) Kevin Anderson	5	1
7	(Switzerland) Roger Federer	7	6
12	(United States) John Isner	7^{7}	7^{7}
20	(Latvia) Ernests Gulbis	6^{4}	6^{3}
(France) Julien Benneteau	1	3
2	(Serbia) Novak Djokovic	6	6

Semifinals
28	(Ukraine) Alexandr Dolgopolov	3	1
7	(Switzerland) Roger Federer	6	6
12	(United States) John Isner	5	7^{7}	1
2	(Serbia) Novak Djokovic	7	6^{2}	6

Final
7	(Switzerland) Roger Federer	6	3	6^{3}
2	(Serbia) Novak Djokovic	3	6	7^{7}

=== Top half ===
==== Section 1 ====
First round
(Czech Republic) R Štěpánek	6	3	6
(Uzbekistan) D Istomin	1	6	1
(United States) T Smyczek	6	1	6
WC	(United States) J Sock	4	6	4
(Ukraine) S Stakhovsky	6	7
(Poland) Ł Kubot	4	5
(Kazakhstan) A Golubev	4	5
WC	(United States) R Harrison	6	7

Second round
1	(Spain) R Nadal	2	6	7
(Czech Republic) R Štěpánek	6	4	5
(United States) T Smyczek	6^{3}	4
28	(Ukraine) A Dolgopolov	7^{7}	6
23	(France) G Monfils	6	6
(Ukraine) S Stakhovsky	2	4
WC	(United States) R Harrison	7	1	4
13	(Italy) F Fognini	5	6	6

Third round
1	(Spain) R Nadal	3	6	6^{5}
28	(Ukraine) A Dolgopolov	6	3	7^{7}
23	(France) G Monfils	2	6	5
13	(Italy) F Fognini	6	3	7

Fourth round
28	(Ukraine) A Dolgopolov	6	6
13	(Italy) F Fognini	2	4

==== Section 2 ====
First round
(Germany) B Becker	4	2
(France) É Roger-Vasselin	6	6
(Colombia) A Falla	6	6
(Argentina) F Delbonis	3	4
(Czech Republic) J Veselý	3	6	7^{7}
(Netherlands) I Sijsling	6	4	6^{1}
Q	(Serbia) D Lajović	7^{7}	5	4
(Czech Republic) L Rosol	6^{2}	7	6

Second round
10	(Canada) M Raonic	7^{7}	4	7^{7}
(France) É Roger-Vasselin	6^{4}	6	6^{2}
(Colombia) A Falla	6	2	7^{7}
18	(Poland) J Janowicz	3	6	6^{5}
32	(Spain) P Andújar	1	6	1
(Czech Republic) J Veselý	6	2	6
(Czech Republic) L Rosol	6	3	2
5	(United Kingdom) A Murray	4	6	6

Third round
10	(Canada) M Raonic	6	6
(Colombia) A Falla	4	3
(Czech Republic) J Veselý	7^{7}	4	4
5	(United Kingdom) A Murray	6^{2}	6	6

Fourth round
10	(Canada) M Raonic	4	7	6
5	(United Kingdom) A Murray	6	5	3

==== Section 3 ====
First round
(Croatia) I Karlović	6	6
(Russia) A Bogomolov Jr.	4	4
Q	(United States) A Kuznetsov	3	3
(United States) S Querrey	6	6
(Australia) L Hewitt	7^{7}	3	6
(Australia) M Ebden	6^{2}	6	3
(United States) M Russell	4	6	6
(United States) D Young	6	1	2

Second round
3	(Switzerland) S Wawrinka	6	7
(Croatia) I Karlović	3	5
(United States) S Querrey	6	6^{3}	3
29	(Italy) A Seppi	4	7^{7}	6
17	(South Africa) K Anderson	7^{7}	6
(Australia) L Hewitt	6^{5}	4
(United States) M Russell	4	3
LL	(Russia) E Donskoy^{[b]}	6	6

Third round
3	(Switzerland) S Wawrinka	6	6
29	(Italy) A Seppi	0	2
17	(South Africa) K Anderson	4	6	6
LL	(Russia) E Donskoy	6	0	3

Fourth round
3	(Switzerland) S Wawrinka	6^{1}	6	1
17	(South Africa) K Anderson	7^{7}	4	6

==== Section 4 ====
First round
(France) J Chardy	7^{7}	7
WC	(United States) R Williams	6^{5}	5
(Spain) D Gimeno Traver	3	6	4
(Colombia) S Giraldo	6	4	6
(Argentina) J Mónaco	6	6^{5}	6
Q	(Canada) P Polansky	4	7^{7}	4
Q	(United States) R Ginepri	2	3
Q	(France) P-H Mathieu	6	6

Second round
11	(Germany) T Haas	6	6
(France) J Chardy	3	4
(Colombia) S Giraldo	1	3
19	(Japan) K Nishikori	6	6
27	(Russia) D Tursunov	7^{7}	6
(Argentina) J Mónaco	6^{4}	4
Q	(France) P-H Mathieu	2	6^{5}
7	(Switzerland) R Federer	6	7^{7}

Third round
11	(Germany) T Haas	7^{7}	6
19	(Japan) K Nishikori	6^{3}	2
27	(Russia) D Tursunov	6^{7}	6^{2}
7	(Switzerland) R Federer	7^{9}	7^{7}

Fourth round
11	(Germany) T Haas	4	4
7	(Switzerland) R Federer	6	6

=== Bottom half ===
==== Section 5 ====
First round
(France) N Mahut	2	5
(Russia) T Gabashvili	6	7
(Argentina) H Zeballos	6	7^{7}
WC	(United States) R Ram	3	6^{4}
(Germany) T Kamke	0	4
(Chinese Taipei) Y-h Lu	6	6
LL	(Belgium) D Goffin^{[e]}	6^{5}	6	6^{3}
(Russia) N Davydenko	7^{7}	4	7^{7}

Second round
8	(France) R Gasquet^{[d]}	6	2
(Russia) T Gabashvili	0	0^{r}
(Argentina) H Zeballos	5	5
30	(Spain) F Verdasco	7	7
22	(Germany) P Kohlschreiber	2	2
(Chinese Taipei) Y-h Lu	6	6
(Russia) N Davydenko	6^{5}	3
12	(United States) J Isner	7^{7}	6

Third round
8	(France) R Gasquet	6^{5}	1
30	(Spain) F Verdasco	7^{7}	6
(Chinese Taipei) Y-h Lu	4	3
12	(United States) J Isner	6	6

Fourth round
30	(Spain) F Verdasco	6^{3}	6	3
12	(United States) J Isner	7^{7}	3	6

==== Section 6 ====
First round
(Netherlands) R Haase	6	6
Q	(Australia) J-P Smith	4	4
(Kazakhstan) A Nedovyesov	4	1
(Portugal) J Sousa	6	6
(Germany) D Brands	6	2	2
(Finland) J Nieminen	4	6	6
(Spain) R Bautista Agut	6	6
WC	(United States) S Johnson	3	3

Second round
15	(Bulgaria) G Dimitrov	6	6
(Netherlands) R Haase	4	3
(Portugal) J Sousa	3	3
20	(Latvia) E Gulbis	6	6
26	(Germany) F Mayer	2	0^{r}
(Finland) J Nieminen^{[c]}	6	1
(Spain) R Bautista Agut	4	6	6
4	(Czech Republic) T Berdych	6	2	4

Third round
15	(Bulgaria) G Dimitrov	6	1	5
20	(Latvia) E Gulbis	2	6	7
(Finland) J Nieminen	2	6	6^{6}
(Spain) R Bautista Agut	6	4	7^{8}

Fourth round
20	(Latvia) E Gulbis	7^{7}	4	6
(Spain) R Bautista Agut	6^{0}	6	2

==== Section 7 ====
First round
(Spain) F López	7	6
(Israel) D Sela	5	3
(Kazakhstan) M Kukushkin	6	2	7^{7}
Q	(Australia) S Groth	4	6	6^{4}
Q	(Austria) D Thiem	6	7^{7}
Q	(United States) D Kosakowski	2	6^{1}
(France) J Benneteau	3	6	6
Q	(Spain) D Muñoz de la Nava	6	1	3

Second round
LL	(United Kingdom) J Ward^{[a]}	6	2	4
(Spain) F López	3	6	6
(Kazakhstan) M Kukushkin	6	6
25	(Canada) V Pospisil	0	2
21	(France) G Simon	6^{5}	2
Q	(Austria) D Thiem	7^{7}	6
(France) J Benneteau	6	6
9	(France) J-W Tsonga	4	4

Third round
(Spain) F López	1	6	6
(Kazakhstan) M Kukushkin	6	3	4
Q	(Austria) D Thiem	6^{4}	3
(France) J Benneteau	7^{7}	6

Fourth round
(Spain) F López	3	6^{4}
(France) J Benneteau	6	7^{7}

==== Section 8 ====
First round
(United States) B Klahn	4	4
(Australia) M Matosevic	6	6
(Spain) P Carreño Busta	6	1	2
Q	(Italy) P Lorenzi	3	6	6
(Colombia) A González	5	6	7^{8}
(France) A Mannarino	7	4	6^{6}
(Romania) V Hănescu	7	3	6
Q	(France) S Robert	5	6	4

Second round
16	(Spain) T Robredo	7^{8}	5	6
(Australia) M Matosevic	6^{6}	7	4
Q	(Italy) P Lorenzi	2	2
24	(Croatia) M Čilić	6	6
31	(Croatia) I Dodig	4	6	6^{5}
(Colombia) A González	6	2	7^{7}
(Romania) V Hănescu	6^{1}	2
2	(Serbia) N Djokovic	7^{7}	6

Third round
16	(Spain) T Robredo	4	3
24	(Croatia) M Čilić	6	6
(Colombia) A González	1	6	1
2	(Serbia) N Djokovic	6	3	6

Fourth round
24	(Croatia) M Čilić	6	2	3
2	(Serbia) N Djokovic	1	6	6

== Qualifying ==
=== Seeds ===
1. (India) Somdev Devvarman (first round)
2. (Serbia) Dušan Lajović (qualified)
3. (Belgium) David Goffin (qualifying competition, lucky loser)
4. (France) Stéphane Robert (qualified)
5. (Italy) Paolo Lorenzi (qualified)
6. (Austria) Dominic Thiem (qualified)
7. (Argentina) Guido Pella (qualifying competition)
8. (Russia) Evgeny Donskoy (qualifying competition, lucky loser)
9. (Czech Republic) Jan Hájek (first round)
10. (France) Paul-Henri Mathieu (qualified)
11. (United States) Alex Kuznetsov (qualified)
12. (United States) Wayne Odesnik (first round)
13. (Slovakia) Andrej Martin (qualifying competition)
14. (Canada) Peter Polansky (qualified)
15. (Chinese Taipei) Jimmy Wang (first round)
16. (Netherlands) Thiemo de Bakker (first round)
17. (Bosnia and Herzegovina) Damir Džumhur (first round)
18. (United Kingdom) James Ward (qualifying competition, lucky loser)
19. (Belgium) Ruben Bemelmans (qualifying competition)
20. (Ukraine) Illya Marchenko (first round)
21. (Brazil) Guilherme Clezar (first round)
22. (Australia) Samuel Groth (qualified)
23. (United States) Bobby Reynolds (qualifying competition)
24. (South Africa) Rik de Voest (withdrew)

=== Qualifiers ===
1. (Spain) Daniel Muñoz de la Nava
2. (Serbia) Dušan Lajović
3. (United States) Daniel Kosakowski
4. (France) Stéphane Robert
5. (Italy) Paolo Lorenzi
6. (Austria) Dominic Thiem
7. (Canada) Peter Polansky
8. (Australia) Samuel Groth
9. (United States) Robby Ginepri
10. (France) Paul-Henri Mathieu
11. (United States) Alex Kuznetsov
12. (Australia) John-Patrick Smith

=== Lucky losers ===
1. (Belgium) David Goffin^{[e]}
2. (Russia) Evgeny Donskoy^{[b]}
3. (United Kingdom) James Ward^{[a]}

=== Qualifying draw ===
Key

- Q = Qualifier
- WC = Wild card
- LL = Lucky loser
- Alt = Alternate
- ITF = ITF entry
- PR = Protected ranking
- SR = Special ranking
- SE = Special exempt
- JE = Junior exempt
- JR = Junior Accelerator Programme entrant
- CO = College Accelerator Programme entrant
- NG = Next Gen Accelerator Program entrant
- w/o = Walkover
- r = Retired
- d = Defaulted

==== First qualifier ====
First round
1	(India) Somdev Devvarman	2	7	3
(Spain) Daniel Muñoz de la Nava	6	5	6
(United States) Greg Ouellette	6	2	6
15	(Chinese Taipei) Jimmy Wang	3	6	4

Qualifying competition
(Spain) Daniel Muñoz de la Nava	6	6
(United States) Greg Ouellette	1	3

==== Second qualifier ====
First round
2	(Serbia) Dušan Lajović	6	6
(Australia) Thanasi Kokkinakis	3	3
(Germany) Mischa Zverev	6^{5}	5
19	(Belgium) Ruben Bemelmans	7^{7}	7

Qualifying competition
2	(Serbia) Dušan Lajović	6	6
19	(Belgium) Ruben Bemelmans	2	4

==== Third qualifier ====
First round
3	(Belgium) David Goffin	6	7^{8}
(Republic of Ireland) James McGee	2	6^{6}
(United States) Daniel Kosakowski	6	6
16	(Netherlands) Thiemo de Bakker	1	2

Qualifying competition
3	(Belgium) David Goffin	3	2
(United States) Daniel Kosakowski	6	6

==== Fourth qualifier ====
First round
4	(France) Stéphane Robert	6	6
WC	(United States) Marcos Giron	4	2
WC	(United States) Clay Thompson	6^{4}	6^{6}
23	(United States) Bobby Reynolds	7^{7}	7^{8}

Qualifying competition
4	(France) Stéphane Robert	7	6^{3}	6
23	(United States) Bobby Reynolds	5	7^{7}	2

==== Fifth qualifier ====
First round
5	(Italy) Paolo Lorenzi	6	6
(Spain) Adrián Menéndez Maceiras	3	3
PR	(United States) Robert Kendrick	4	6	3
Alt	(United States) Michael Shabaz	6	1	6

Qualifying competition
5	(Italy) Paolo Lorenzi	4	7^{7}	6
Alt	(United States) Michael Shabaz	6	6^{4}	2

==== Sixth qualifier ====
First round
6	(Austria) Dominic Thiem	7^{7}	6
(Australia) Matt Reid	6^{4}	1
WC	(United States) Nicolas Meister	4	6	7^{10}
20	(Ukraine) Illya Marchenko	6	2	6^{8}

Qualifying competition
6	(Austria) Dominic Thiem	6	6
WC	(United States) Nicolas Meister	4	2

==== Seventh qualifier ====
First round
7	(Argentina) Guido Pella	7	6
(Mexico) Daniel Garza	5	2
(Canada) Steven Diez	1	0
14	(Canada) Peter Polansky	6	6

Qualifying competition
7	(Argentina) Guido Pella	4	6	1
14	(Canada) Peter Polansky	6	3	6

==== Eighth qualifier ====
First round
8	(Russia) Evgeny Donskoy	6	6
(United States) Jesse Witten	4	2
WC	(United States) Stefan Kozlov	3	4
22	(Australia) Samuel Groth	6	6

Qualifying competition
8	(Russia) Evgeny Donskoy	7	6^{5}	4
22	(Australia) Samuel Groth	5	7^{7}	6

==== Ninth qualifier ====
First round
9	(Czech Republic) Jan Hájek	2	2
(United States) Robby Ginepri	6	6
(United States) Austin Krajicek	4	6	7
17	(Bosnia and Herzegovina) Damir Džumhur	6	3	5

Qualifying competition
(United States) Robby Ginepri	6	7
(United States) Austin Krajicek	1	5

==== Tenth qualifier ====
First round
10	(France) Paul-Henri Mathieu	6	6
WC	(United States) Raymond Sarmiento	4	2
(Greece) Theodoros Angelinos	0	6^{4}
18	(United Kingdom) James Ward	6	7^{7}

Qualifying competition
10	(France) Paul-Henri Mathieu	6	6
18	(United Kingdom) James Ward	2	3

==== Eleventh qualifier ====
First round
11	(United States) Alex Kuznetsov	6	6
(Mexico) Miguel Ángel Reyes-Varela	4	4
(Japan) Taro Daniel	6^{6}	6	6
21	(Brazil) Guilherme Clezar	7^{8}	4	2

Qualifying competition
11	(United States) Alex Kuznetsov	6^{5}	7^{7}	6
(Japan) Taro Daniel	7^{7}	6^{4}	2

==== Twelfth qualifier ====
First round
12	(United States) Wayne Odesnik	4	6	6^{1}
(Australia) John-Patrick Smith	6	3	7^{7}
(United Kingdom) Daniel Cox	3	4
13	(Slovakia) Andrej Martin	6	6

Qualifying competition
(Australia) John-Patrick Smith	6	7
13	(Slovakia) Andrej Martin	3	5

== Notes ==
a. James Ward received a lucky loser spot in the main draw after No. 6 seed Juan Martín del Potro withdrew with a wrist injury.
b. Evgeny Donskoy received a lucky loser spot in the main draw after No. 14 seed Mikhail Youzhny withdrew with a back injury.
c. Jarkko Nieminen advanced to the third round after No. 26 seed Florian Mayer was forced to retire in the second set with a leg injury.
d. No. 8 seed Richard Gasquet advanced to the third round after Teymuraz Gabashvili was forced to retire in the second set citing illness.
e. David Goffin received a lucky loser spot in the main draw after Michał Przysiężny withdrew with a left arm injury.
