= 2014 BNP Paribas Open – Men's doubles =

Men's doubles
- 2014 BNP Paribas Open

Final
- Champions: (United States) Bob Bryan (United States) Mike Bryan
- Runners-up: (Austria) Alexander Peya (Brazil) Bruno Soares
- Score: 6–4, 6–3

Events
Singles	men	women
Doubles	men	women
← 2013 ·	BNP Paribas Open	· 2015 →

Bob and Mike Bryan were the defending champions, and retained their title defeating Alexander Peya and Bruno Soares in the final, 6–4, 6–3.

== Seeds ==
1. (United States) Bob Bryan / (United States) Mike Bryan (champions)
2. (Austria) Alexander Peya / (Brazil) Bruno Soares (final)
3. (Croatia) Ivan Dodig / (Brazil) Marcelo Melo (quarterfinals)
4. (India) Leander Paes / (Czech Republic) Radek Štěpánek (quarterfinals)
5. (Spain) David Marrero / (Spain) Fernando Verdasco (second round)
6. (India) Rohan Bopanna / (Pakistan) Aisam-ul-Haq Qureshi (first round)
7. (Canada) Daniel Nestor / (Serbia) Nenad Zimonjić (second round)
8. (Poland) Łukasz Kubot / (Sweden) Robert Lindstedt (second round)

== Draw ==
=== Key ===
- Q = Qualifier
- WC = Wild card
- LL = Lucky loser
- Alt = Alternate
- SE = Special exempt
- PR = Protected ranking
- ITF = ITF entry
- JE = Junior exempt
- w/o = Walkover
- r = Retired
- d = Defaulted
- SR = Special ranking

=== Finals ===
Semifinals
1	(United States) Bob Bryan (United States) Mike Bryan	6^{4}	6	[10]
(United States) John Isner (United States) Sam Querrey	7^{7}	1	[7]
(Switzerland) Roger Federer (Switzerland) Stanislas Wawrinka	4	1
2	(Austria) Alexander Peya (Brazil) Bruno Soares	6	6

Final
1	(United States) Bob Bryan (United States) Mike Bryan	6	6
2	(Austria) Alexander Peya (Brazil) Bruno Soares	4	3

=== Top half ===
First round
1	(United States) B Bryan (United States) M Bryan	6	6
(United States) S Lipsky (Germany) F Mayer	1	3
(France) J Benneteau (France) É Roger-Vasselin	6	4	[10]
(United Kingdom) J Murray (Australia) J Peers	3	6	[5]
(South Africa) K Anderson (Netherlands) R Haase	5	6^{3}
(France) N Mahut (France) J-W Tsonga	7	7^{7}
(Croatia) M Čilić (Argentina) JM del Potro	6	3	[8]
7	(Canada) D Nestor (Serbia) N Zimonjić	4	6	[10]
3	(Croatia) I Dodig (Brazil) M Melo	6	6
(Belarus) M Mirnyi (Russia) M Youzhny	3	2
(Netherlands) J-J Rojer (Romania) H Tecău	7	6^{4}	[8]
PR	(United Kingdom) C Fleming (United Kingdom) R Hutchins	5	7^{7}	[10]
(United States) J Isner (United States) S Querrey	7	6
(France) J Chardy (France) G Simon	5	2
(Spain) F López (Spain) T Robredo	4	6	[7]
8	(Poland) Ł Kubot (Sweden) R Lindstedt	6	3	[10]

Second round
1	(United States) B Bryan (United States) M Bryan	6	6
(France) J Benneteau (France) É Roger-Vasselin	3	2
(France) N Mahut (France) J-W Tsonga	6^{7}	7^{7}	[11]
7	(Canada) D Nestor (Serbia) N Zimonjić	7^{9}	6^{5}	[9]
3	(Croatia) I Dodig (Brazil) M Melo	3	6	[10]
PR	(United Kingdom) C Fleming (United Kingdom) R Hutchins	6	4	[6]
(United States) J Isner (United States) S Querrey	6	7^{8}
8	(Poland) Ł Kubot (Sweden) R Lindstedt	3	6^{6}

Quarterfinals
1	(United States) B Bryan (United States) M Bryan	7^{11}	7^{7}
(France) N Mahut (France) J-W Tsonga	6^{9}	6^{3}
3	(Croatia) I Dodig (Brazil) M Melo	6	5	[8]
(United States) J Isner (United States) S Querrey	4	7	[10]

Semifinals
1	(United States) B Bryan (United States) M Bryan	6^{4}	6	[10]
(United States) J Isner (United States) S Querrey	7^{7}	1	[7]

=== Bottom half ===
First round
6	(India) R Bopanna (Pakistan) A-u-H Qureshi	2	7^{7}	[6]
(Switzerland) R Federer (Switzerland) S Wawrinka	6	6^{4}	[10]
(Latvia) E Gulbis (Canada) M Raonic	7^{7}	6
WC	(Serbia) N Djokovic (Serbia) F Krajinović	6^{3}	1
(Poland) M Fyrstenberg (Poland) M Matkowski	6	5	[9]
WC	(Israel) J Erlich (France) R Gasquet	4	7	[11]
(Poland) J Janowicz (Germany) P Kohlschreiber	6^{6}	6	[5]
4	(India) L Paes (Czech Republic) R Štěpánek	7^{8}	3	[10]
5	(Spain) D Marrero (Spain) F Verdasco	7^{7}	6
(Spain) P Andújar (Canada) V Pospisil	6^{4}	3
(Italy) F Fognini (Italy) A Seppi	6	5	[6]
(Philippines) T Huey (United Kingdom) D Inglot	4	7	[10]
(United Kingdom) J Marray (United Kingdom) A Murray	6	4	[11]
(Argentina) J Mónaco (France) G Monfils	4	6	[9]
(United States) E Butorac (South Africa) R Klaasen	6	6^{4}	[6]
2	(Austria) A Peya (Brazil) B Soares	2	7^{7}	[10]

Second round
(Switzerland) R Federer (Switzerland) S Wawrinka	7^{7}	7^{7}
(Latvia) E Gulbis (Canada) M Raonic	6^{3}	6^{4}
WC	(Israel) J Erlich (France) R Gasquet	3	5
4	(India) L Paes (Czech Republic) R Štěpánek	6	7
5	(Spain) D Marrero (Spain) F Verdasco	6	3	[7]
(Philippines) T Huey (United Kingdom) D Inglot	3	6	[10]
(United Kingdom) J Marray (United Kingdom) A Murray	6^{1}	3
2	(Austria) A Peya (Brazil) B Soares	7^{7}	6

Quarterfinals
(Switzerland) R Federer (Switzerland) S Wawrinka	6	6^{6}	[10]
4	(India) L Paes (Czech Republic) R Štěpánek	3	7^{8}	[4]
(Philippines) T Huey (United Kingdom) D Inglot	6^{4}	7^{7}	[7]
2	(Austria) A Peya (Brazil) B Soares	7^{7}	6^{3}	[10]

Semifinals
(Switzerland) R Federer (Switzerland) S Wawrinka	4	1
2	(Austria) A Peya (Brazil) B Soares	6	6
