= 2013 BNP Paribas Open – Men's doubles =

Men's doubles
- 2013 BNP Paribas Open

Final
- Champions: (United States) Bob Bryan (United States) Mike Bryan
- Runners-up: (Philippines) Treat Conrad Huey (Poland) Jerzy Janowicz
- Score: 6–3, 3–6, [10–6]

Events
Singles	men	women
Doubles	men	women
← 2012 ·	BNP Paribas Open	· 2014 →

Marc López and Rafael Nadal were the defending champions, but Nadal decided not to participate this year. López played alongside Marcel Granollers, but lost in the second round to Alexander Peya and Bruno Soares.

Bob and Mike Bryan won the title, defeating Treat Conrad Huey and Jerzy Janowicz 6–3, 3–6, [10–6] in the final. With the win, the Bryan brothers became the first team to achieve all nine ATP Masters 1000 events.

== Seeds ==
1. (United States) Bob Bryan / (United States) Mike Bryan (champions)
2. (Spain) Marcel Granollers / (Spain) Marc López (second round)
3. (India) Mahesh Bhupathi / (Canada) Daniel Nestor (first round)
4. (Belarus) Max Mirnyi / (Romania) Horia Tecău (withdrew)
5. (Sweden) Robert Lindstedt / (Serbia) Nenad Zimonjić (first round)
6. (Pakistan) Aisam-ul-Haq Qureshi / (Netherlands) Jean-Julien Rojer (first round)
7. (Austria) Jürgen Melzer / (India) Leander Paes (withdrew)
8. (Poland) Mariusz Fyrstenberg / (Poland) Marcin Matkowski (first round)

== Draw ==
=== Key ===
- Q = Qualifier
- WC = Wild card
- LL = Lucky loser
- Alt = Alternate
- ITF = ITF entry
- PR = Protected ranking
- SR = Special ranking
- SE = Special exempt
- JE = Junior exempt
- JR = Junior Accelerator Programme entrant
- CO = College Accelerator Programme entrant
- NG = Next Gen Accelerator Program entrant
- w/o = Walkover
- r = Retired
- d = Defaulted

=== Finals ===
Semifinals
1	(United States) Bob Bryan (United States) Mike Bryan	6	4	[11]
(Mexico) Santiago González (United States) Scott Lipsky	4	6	[9]
(Philippines) Treat Conrad Huey (Poland) Jerzy Janowicz	7	1	[12]
(Austria) Alexander Peya (Brazil) Bruno Soares	5	6	[10]

Final
1	(United States) Bob Bryan (United States) Mike Bryan	6	3	[10]
(Philippines) Treat Conrad Huey (Poland) Jerzy Janowicz	3	6	[6]

=== Top half ===
First round
1	(United States) B Bryan (United States) M Bryan	6	7
(Croatia) M Čilić (Israel) J Erlich	2	5
(United States) J Isner (United States) S Querrey	6	6
(Spain) D Ferrer (Spain) T Robredo	3	4
(India) R Bopanna (United States) R Ram	4	6^{4}
(Poland) Ł Kubot (Serbia) J Tipsarević	6	7^{7}
(France) J Benneteau (France) R Gasquet	6	7^{7}
8	(Poland) M Fyrstenberg (Poland) M Matkowski	4	6^{4}
Alt	(Italy) F Fognini (Serbia) V Troicki	4	4
(Mexico) S González (United States) S Lipsky	6	6
(Slovakia) M Kližan (Italy) A Seppi	2	4
(Colombia) JS Cabal (Germany) F Mayer	6	6
(Argentina) J Mónaco (Argentina) H Zeballos	3	7^{8}	[3]
(Croatia) I Dodig (Brazil) M Melo	6	6^{6}	[10]
(Bulgaria) G Dimitrov (Denmark) F Nielsen	7	7
6	(Pakistan) A-u-H Qureshi (Netherlands) J-J Rojer	5	5

Second round
1	(United States) B Bryan (United States) M Bryan	6	6
(United States) J Isner (United States) S Querrey	3	3
(Poland) Ł Kubot (Serbia) J Tipsarević	6	6
(France) J Benneteau (France) R Gasquet	2	2
(Mexico) S González (United States) S Lipsky	6	6
(Colombia) JS Cabal (Germany) F Mayer	4	4
(Croatia) I Dodig (Brazil) M Melo	6^{1}	6	[10]
(Bulgaria) G Dimitrov (Denmark) F Nielsen	7^{7}	1	[8]

Quarterfinals
1	(United States) B Bryan (United States) M Bryan	6^{4}	6	[10]
(Poland) Ł Kubot (Serbia) J Tipsarević	7^{7}	4	[7]
(Mexico) S González (United States) S Lipsky	4	6	[10]
(Croatia) I Dodig (Brazil) M Melo	6	3	[5]

Semifinals
1	(United States) B Bryan (United States) M Bryan	6	4	[11]
(Mexico) S González (United States) S Lipsky	4	6	[9]

=== Bottom half ===
First round
5	(Sweden) R Lindstedt (Serbia) N Zimonjić	4	6	[4]
WC	(United Kingdom) A Murray (United Kingdom) J Murray	6	4	[10]
Alt	(Romania) V Hănescu (Germany) F Moser	4	4
(Philippines) TC Huey (Poland) J Janowicz	6	6
(Spain) D Marrero (Spain) F Verdasco	4	4
WC	(United States) J Blake (United States) M Fish	6	6
(Spain) F López (Canada) M Raonic	6	7^{7}
3	(India) M Bhupathi (Canada) D Nestor	4	6^{4}
Alt	(Spain) P Andújar (Spain) D Gimeno-Traver	4	6	[10]
(France) B Paire (Switzerland) S Wawrinka	6	2	[8]
(Germany) T Haas (Belgium) X Malisse	4	6^{4}
(United Kingdom) C Fleming (Australia) P Hanley	6	7^{7}
(Netherlands) R Haase (France) G Simon	2	2
(Austria) A Peya (Brazil) B Soares	6	6
(Spain) N Almagro (Germany) P Petzschner	2	2
2	(Spain) M Granollers (Spain) M López	6	6

Second round
WC	(United Kingdom) A Murray (United Kingdom) J Murray	3	5
(Philippines) TC Huey (Poland) J Janowicz	6	7
WC	(United States) J Blake (United States) M Fish	6	6
(Spain) F López (Canada) M Raonic	3	3
Alt	(Spain) P Andújar (Spain) D Gimeno-Traver	3	2
(United Kingdom) C Fleming (Australia) P Hanley	6	6
(Austria) A Peya (Brazil) B Soares	6	6
2	(Spain) M Granollers (Spain) M López	3	2

Quarterfinals
(Philippines) TC Huey (Poland) J Janowicz	7	6
WC	(United States) J Blake (United States) M Fish	5	2
(United Kingdom) C Fleming (Australia) P Hanley	3	6	[5]
(Austria) A Peya (Brazil) B Soares	6	4	[10]

Semifinals
(Philippines) TC Huey (Poland) J Janowicz	7	1	[12]
(Austria) A Peya (Brazil) B Soares	5	6	[10]
