= 2013 BNP Paribas Open – Women's singles =

Women's singles
- 2013 BNP Paribas Open

Final
- Champion: (Russia) Maria Sharapova
- Runner-up: (Denmark) Caroline Wozniacki
- Score: 6–2, 6–2

Details
- Draw: 96
- Seeds: 32

Events
Singles	men	women
Doubles	men	women
← 2012 ·	Indian Wells Open	· 2014 →

Maria Sharapova defeated Caroline Wozniacki in the final, 6–2, 6–2 to win the women's singles tennis title at the 2013 Indian Wells Masters. It was her second Indian Wells Masters title, and she did not drop a set during the tournament.

Victoria Azarenka was the defending champion, but withdrew before her quarterfinal match against Wozniacki.

== Seeds ==
All seeds receive a bye into the second round.

1. (Belarus) Victoria Azarenka (quarterfinals, withdrew because of a right ankle injury)
2. (Russia) Maria Sharapova (champion)
3. (Poland) Agnieszka Radwańska (fourth round)
4. (Germany) Angelique Kerber (semifinals)
5. (Czech Republic) Petra Kvitová (quarterfinals)
6. (Italy) Sara Errani (quarterfinals)
7. (Australia) Samantha Stosur (quarterfinals, withdrew because of a right calf injury)
8. (Denmark) Caroline Wozniacki (final)
9. (France) Marion Bartoli (fourth round)
10. (Russia) Nadia Petrova (fourth round)
11. (Serbia) Ana Ivanovic (third round)
12. (Slovakia) Dominika Cibulková (third round)
13. (Russia) Maria Kirilenko (semifinals)
14. (Italy) Roberta Vinci (third round)
15. (United States) Sloane Stephens (second round)
16. (Czech Republic) Lucie Šafářová (second round)
17. (Russia) Ekaterina Makarova (second round)
18. (Serbia) Jelena Janković (second round)
19. (Czech Republic) Klára Zakopalová (fourth round)
20. (Chinese Taipei) Hsieh Su-wei (second round)
21. (Germany) Julia Görges (third round)
22. (United States) Varvara Lepchenko (second round)
23. (Austria) Tamira Paszek (second round)
24. (Germany) Mona Barthel (fourth round)
25. (Spain) Carla Suárez Navarro (third round)
26. (Russia) Anastasia Pavlyuchenkova (second round)
27. (Romania) Sorana Cîrstea (third round)
28. (Belgium) Kirsten Flipkens (third round)
29. (Russia) Elena Vesnina (third round)
30. (Belgium) Yanina Wickmayer (third round)
31. (Kazakhstan) Yaroslava Shvedova (second round)
32. (China) Peng Shuai (third round)

== Draw ==
=== Key ===
- Q = Qualifier
- WC = Wild card
- LL = Lucky loser
- Alt = Alternate
- SE = Special exempt
- PR = Protected ranking
- ITF = ITF entry
- JE = Junior exempt
- w/o = Walkover
- r = Retired
- d = Defaulted
- SR = Special ranking

=== Finals ===
Quarterfinals
1	(Belarus) Victoria Azarenka
8	(Denmark) Caroline Wozniacki	w/o
4	(Germany) Angelique Kerber	w/o
7	(Australia) Samantha Stosur
5	(Czech Republic) Petra Kvitová	6	4	3
13	(Russia) Maria Kirilenko	4	6	6
6	(Italy) Sara Errani	6^{6}	2
2	(Russia) Maria Sharapova	7^{8}	6

Semifinals
8	(Denmark) Caroline Wozniacki	2	6	7
4	(Germany) Angelique Kerber	6	4	5
13	(Russia) Maria Kirilenko	4	3
2	(Russia) Maria Sharapova	6	6

Final
8	(Denmark) Caroline Wozniacki	2	2
2	(Russia) Maria Sharapova	6	6

=== Top half ===
==== Section 1 ====
First round
Q	(France) S Foretz Gacon	3	6	4
(Slovakia) D Hantuchová	6	3	6
Q	(Ukraine) E Svitolina	0	0
(Romania) M Niculescu	6	6
WC	(United States) B Mattek-Sands	7	3	1
(United States) J Hampton	5	6	6
(Poland) U Radwańska	6	6
(Netherlands) A Rus	3	3

Second round
1	(Belarus) V Azarenka	6	6
(Slovakia) D Hantuchová	4	1
(Romania) M Niculescu	6	4	3
28	(Belgium) K Flipkens	4	6	6
20	(Chinese Taipei) S-w Hsieh	3	3
(United States) J Hampton	6	6
(Poland) U Radwańska	6	6
15	(United States) S Stephens	3	4

Third round
1	(Belarus) V Azarenka	3	6	6
28	(Belgium) K Flipkens	6	3	0
(United States) J Hampton	0	6^{4}
(Poland) U Radwańska	6	7^{7}

Fourth round
1	(Belarus) V Azarenka	6	6
(Poland) U Radwańska	3	1

==== Section 2 ====
First round
(Croatia) P Martić	6	4	3
LL	(Switzerland) S Vögele	4	6	6
(United Kingdom) L Robson	6	6^{2}	1
(Sweden) S Arvidsson	2	7^{7}	6
WC	(Japan) K Date-Krumm	6	3	6
(Kazakhstan) G Voskoboeva	4	6	4
Q	(Puerto Rico) M Puig	7^{7}	2	2
(France) A Cornet	6^{3}	6	6

Second round
10	(Russia) N Petrova	6	6
LL	(Switzerland) S Vögele	2	3
(Sweden) S Arvidsson	3	3
21	(Germany) J Görges	6	6
29	(Russia) E Vesnina	3	7	6
WC	(Japan) K Date-Krumm	6	5	1
(France) A Cornet	4	6	3
8	(Denmark) C Wozniacki	6	3	6

Third round
10	(Russia) N Petrova	6	6
21	(Germany) J Görges	1	2
29	(Russia) E Vesnina	2	1
8	(Denmark) C Wozniacki	6	6

Fourth round
10	(Russia) N Petrova	6^{3}	3
8	(Denmark) C Wozniacki	7^{7}	6

==== Section 3 ====
First round
(Romania) I-C Begu	6	6
(United Kingdom) H Watson	2	4
Q	(Croatia) M Lučić-Baroni	7	6
(France) P Parmentier	5	3
(Serbia) B Jovanovski	6	5	3
Q	(Spain) G Muguruza	2	7	6
(Slovakia) M Rybáriková	7^{7}	6
(Switzerland) R Oprandi	6^{4}	0

Second round
4	(Germany) A Kerber	6	6
(Romania) I-C Begu	3	2
Q	(Croatia) M Lučić-Baroni	6	3	2
30	(Belgium) Y Wickmayer	3	6	6
17	(Russia) E Makarova	3	6	4
Q	(Spain) G Muguruza	6	1	6
(Slovakia) M Rybáriková	6	4	6
16	(Czech Republic) L Šafářová	2	6	2

Third round
4	(Germany) A Kerber	6	7^{7}
30	(Belgium) Y Wickmayer	1	6^{4}
Q	(Spain) G Muguruza	6	6
(Slovakia) M Rybáriková	4	0

Fourth round
4	(Germany) A Kerber	6	7
Q	(Spain) G Muguruza	4	5

==== Section 4 ====
First round
(Czech Republic) L Hradecká	6	6^{1}	3
WC	(United States) T Townsend	3	7^{7}	6
(Germany) A Beck	6	4	1
(Netherlands) K Bertens	3	6	6
PR	(Romania) A Dulgheru	6	6
Q	(Portugal) M Larcher de Brito	4	4
WC	(United States) M Keys	6	4	6
(United States) M Oudin	4	6	3

Second round
11	(Serbia) A Ivanovic	6	6
WC	(United States) T Townsend	1	2
(Netherlands) K Bertens	1	4
24	(Germany) M Barthel	6	6
32	(China) S Peng	6	4	6
PR	(Romania) A Dulgheru	0	6	3
WC	(United States) M Keys	3	4
7	(Australia) S Stosur	6	6

Third round
11	(Serbia) A Ivanovic	1	6	0
24	(Germany) M Barthel	6	3	6
32	(China) S Peng	3	6	2
7	(Australia) S Stosur	6	3	6

Fourth round
24	(Germany) M Barthel	6	2	3
7	(Australia) S Stosur	4	6	6

=== Bottom half ===
==== Section 5 ====
First round
(Luxembourg) M Minella	2	6	4
(Belarus) O Govortsova	6	3	6
(Japan) A Morita	1	2
Q	(Ukraine) L Tsurenko	6	6
(New Zealand) M Erakovic	3	4
WC	(Israel) S Pe'er	6	6
(Romania) S Halep	6	6
(United States) L Davis	2	0

Second round
5	(Czech Republic) P Kvitová	6	3	6
(Belarus) O Govortsova	4	6	3
Q	(Ukraine) L Tsurenko	6	3	6
31	(Kazakhstan) Y Shvedova	1	6	1
19	(Czech Republic) K Zakopalová	6^{2}	6	6
WC	(Israel) S Pe'er	7^{7}	2	3
(Romania) S Halep	5	6^{3}
12	(Slovakia) D Cibulková	7	7^{7}

Third round
5	(Czech Republic) P Kvitová	6	7^{7}
Q	(Ukraine) L Tsurenko	2	6^{5}
19	(Czech Republic) K Zakopalová	6	7
12	(Slovakia) D Cibulková	4	5

Fourth round
5	(Czech Republic) P Kvitová	6	6
19	(Czech Republic) K Zakopalová	2	3

==== Section 6 ====
First round
(Bulgaria) T Pironkova	3	4
(United States) C McHale	6	6
WC	(United States) J Craybas	3	1
Q	(United States) M Burdette	6	6
(Spain) A Medina Garrigues	6	6
Q	(Australia) C Dellacqua	1	3
Q	(Russia) O Puchkova	3	3
WC	(United States) M Sanchez	6	6

Second round
13	(Russia) M Kirilenko	4	6	6
(United States) C McHale	6	4	1
Q	(United States) M Burdette	7^{7}	6
23	(Austria) T Paszek	6^{0}	1
27	(Romania) S Cîrstea	4	6	6
(Spain) A Medina Garrigues	6	3	1
WC	(United States) M Sanchez	2	1
3	(Poland) A Radwańska	6	6

Third round
13	(Russia) M Kirilenko	6	4	6
Q	(United States) M Burdette	3	6	2
27	(Romania) S Cîrstea	7^{7}	3	4
3	(Poland) A Radwańska	6^{3}	6	6

Fourth round
13	(Russia) M Kirilenko	6	4	7
3	(Poland) A Radwańska	1	6	5

==== Section 7 ====
First round
Q	(United States) G Min	6	4	3
(Spain) L Domínguez Lino	1	6	6
(Hungary) T Babos	7^{7}	2	0
(Sweden) J Larsson	6^{5}	6	6
(Russia) S Kuznetsova	6	6
(Czech Republic) A Hlaváčková	3	1
WC	(France) K Mladenovic	4	1
(South Africa) C Scheepers	6	6

Second round
6	(Italy) S Errani	6	3	6
(Spain) L Domínguez Lino	2	6	3
(Sweden) J Larsson	7	6
26	(Russia) A Pavlyuchenkova	5	1
18	(Serbia) J Janković	6	2	5
(Russia) S Kuznetsova	0	6	7
(South Africa) C Scheepers	3	3
9	(France) M Bartoli	6	6

Third round
6	(Italy) S Errani	6	6
(Sweden) J Larsson	3	1
(Russia) S Kuznetsova	4	3
9	(France) M Bartoli	6	6

Fourth round
6	(Italy) S Errani	6	6
9	(France) M Bartoli	3	2

==== Section 8 ====
First round
(China) J Zheng	1	2
(Kazakhstan) K Pervak	6	6
(Spain) L Arruabarrena Vecino	6	1	6
Q	(Kazakhstan) S Karatantcheva	4	6	3
(Spain) S Soler Espinosa	6^{7}	6	6
(United States) V King	7^{9}	2	1
(Italy) F Pennetta	5	1
(Italy) F Schiavone	7	6

Second round
14	(Italy) R Vinci	6	6
(Kazakhstan) K Pervak	3	4
(Spain) L Arruabarrena Vecino	6	6
22	(United States) V Lepchenko	1	4
25	(Spain) C Suárez Navarro	6	6
(Spain) S Soler Espinosa	1	1
(Italy) F Schiavone	2	1
2	(Russia) M Sharapova	6	6

Third round
14	(Italy) R Vinci	6	4	4
(Spain) L Arruabarrena Vecino	2	6	6
25	(Spain) C Suárez Navarro	5	3
2	(Russia) M Sharapova	7	6

Fourth round
(Spain) L Arruabarrena Vecino	5	0
2	(Russia) M Sharapova	7	6

== Qualifying ==
=== Seeds ===
1. (Switzerland) Stefanie Vögele (qualifying competition, lucky loser)
2. (Ukraine) Lesia Tsurenko (qualified)
3. (Japan) Misaki Doi (first round)
4. (Ukraine) Elina Svitolina (qualified)
5. (Spain) María Teresa Torró Flor (qualifying competition)
6. (Kazakhstan) Yulia Putintseva (first round)
7. (United States) CoCo Vandeweghe (first round)
8. (Serbia) Vesna Dolonc (first round)
9. (Spain) Garbiñe Muguruza (qualified)
10. (Greece) Eleni Daniilidou (qualifying competition)
11. (Slovakia) Jana Čepelová (first round)
12. (Czech Republic) Kristýna Plíšková (first round)
13. (Hungary) Melinda Czink (qualifying competition)
14. (Puerto Rico) Monica Puig (qualified)
15. (Portugal) Maria João Koehler (qualifying competition)
16. (Australia) Anastasia Rodionova (qualifying competition)
17. (Croatia) Mirjana Lučić-Baroni (qualified)
18. (Spain) Estrella Cabeza Candela (qualifying competition)
19. (Russia) Olga Puchkova (qualified)
20. (Russia) Nina Bratchikova (qualifying competition)
21. (France) Stéphanie Foretz Gacon (qualified)
22. (Russia) Marta Sirotkina (first round)
23. (United States) Alexa Glatch (first round)
24. (Kazakhstan) Sesil Karatantcheva (qualified)

=== Qualifiers ===
1. (Croatia) Mirjana Lučić-Baroni
2. (Ukraine) Lesia Tsurenko
3. (Portugal) Michelle Larcher de Brito
4. (Ukraine) Elina Svitolina
5. (France) Stéphanie Foretz Gacon
6. (Puerto Rico) Monica Puig
7. (Australia) Casey Dellacqua
8. (Russia) Olga Puchkova
9. (Spain) Garbiñe Muguruza
10. (Kazakhstan) Sesil Karatantcheva
11. (United States) Mallory Burdette
12. (United States) Grace Min

=== Lucky losers ===
1. (Switzerland) Stefanie Vögele

=== Key ===
- Q = Qualifier
- WC = Wild card
- LL = Lucky loser
- Alt = Alternate
- SE = Special exempt
- PR = Protected ranking
- ITF = ITF entry
- JE = Junior exempt
- w/o = Walkover
- r = Retired
- d = Defaulted
- SR = Special ranking

==== First qualifier ====
First round
1	(Switzerland) Stefanie Vögele	3	7	6
WC	(United States) Sachia Vickery	6	5	3
(United States) Jessica Pegula	3	7^{7}	0
17	(Croatia) Mirjana Lučić-Baroni	6	6^{2}	6

Qualifying competition
1	(Switzerland) Stefanie Vögele	7^{7}	3	3
17	(Croatia) Mirjana Lučić-Baroni	6^{2}	6	6

==== Second qualifier ====
First round
2	(Ukraine) Lesia Tsurenko	6	6
(China) Zhou Yimiao	2	2
(United States) Irina Falconi	6^{2}	3
20	(Russia) Nina Bratchikova	7^{7}	6

Qualifying competition
2	(Ukraine) Lesia Tsurenko	6	6
20	(Russia) Nina Bratchikova	3	3

==== Third qualifier ====
First round
3	(Japan) Misaki Doi	1	3
(Portugal) Michelle Larcher de Brito	6	6
(Latvia) Anastasija Sevastova	4	6	6^{2}
16	(Australia) Anastasia Rodionova	6	1	7^{7}

Qualifying competition
(Portugal) Michelle Larcher de Brito	6	6
16	(Australia) Anastasia Rodionova	2	3

==== Fourth qualifier ====
First round
4	(Ukraine) Elina Svitolina	7^{7}	5	6
(Canada) Eugenie Bouchard	6^{2}	7	2
WC	(Croatia) Ajla Tomljanović	6	6
23	(United States) Alexa Glatch	2	4

Qualifying competition
4	(Ukraine) Elina Svitolina	6	6^{3}	6
WC	(Croatia) Ajla Tomljanović	3	7^{7}	4

==== Fifth qualifier ====
First round
5	(Spain) María Teresa Torró Flor	6	6
(Russia) Alexandra Panova	4	4
(China) Zheng Saisai	3	2
21	(France) Stéphanie Foretz Gacon	6	6

Qualifying competition
5	(Spain) María Teresa Torró Flor	2	2
21	(France) Stéphanie Foretz Gacon	6	6

==== Sixth qualifier ====
First round
6	(Kazakhstan) Yulia Putintseva	0	2
WC	(Germany) Andrea Petkovic	6	6
WC	(United States) Samantha Crawford	3	3
14	(Puerto Rico) Monica Puig	6	6

Qualifying competition
WC	(Germany) Andrea Petkovic	6^{2}	3
14	(Puerto Rico) Monica Puig	7^{7}	6

==== Seventh qualifier ====
First round
7	(United States) CoCo Vandeweghe	2	1
(Italy) Nastassja Burnett	6	6
(Australia) Casey Dellacqua	6	6
22	(Russia) Marta Sirotkina	3	2

Qualifying competition
(Italy) Nastassja Burnett	3	1
(Australia) Casey Dellacqua	6	6

==== Eighth qualifier ====
First round
8	(Serbia) Vesna Dolonc	1	2
PR	(Czech Republic) Renata Voráčová	6	6
(Czech Republic) Karolína Plíšková	4	2
19	(Russia) Olga Puchkova	6	6

Qualifying competition
PR	(Czech Republic) Renata Voráčová	6^{5}	2
19	(Russia) Olga Puchkova	7^{7}	6

==== Ninth qualifier ====
First round
9	(Spain) Garbiñe Muguruza	6	6
WC	(Canada) Gabriela Dabrowski	3	3
(Russia) Vera Dushevina	1	6	6^{4}
15	(Portugal) Maria João Koehler	6	2	7^{7}

Qualifying competition
9	(Spain) Garbiñe Muguruza	6	6
15	(Portugal) Maria João Koehler	3	2

==== Tenth qualifier ====
First round
10	(Greece) Eleni Daniilidou	3	6	6
(Czech Republic) Eva Birnerová	6	4	4
(Colombia) Mariana Duque Mariño	3	6^{3}
24	(Kazakhstan) Sesil Karatantcheva	6	7^{7}

Qualifying competition
10	(Greece) Eleni Daniilidou	4	6^{6}
24	(Kazakhstan) Sesil Karatantcheva	6	7^{8}

==== Eleventh qualifier ====
First round
11	(Slovakia) Jana Čepelová	3	3
(United States) Mallory Burdette	6	6
(United States) Julia Cohen	7^{7}	4	5
13	(Hungary) Melinda Czink	6^{2}	6	7

Qualifying competition
(United States) Mallory Burdette	6	6
13	(Hungary) Melinda Czink	2	1

==== Twelfth qualifier ====
First round
12	(Czech Republic) Kristýna Plíšková	6	6^{8}	3
WC	(United States) Grace Min	4	7^{10}	6
(Canada) Sharon Fichman	2	2
18	(Spain) Estrella Cabeza Candela	6	6

Qualifying competition
WC	(United States) Grace Min	6	6
18	(Spain) Estrella Cabeza Candela	4	0
