= 2014 BNP Paribas Open – Women's doubles =

Women's doubles
- 2014 BNP Paribas Open

Final
- Champions: (Chinese Taipei) Hsieh Su-wei (China) Peng Shuai
- Runners-up: (Zimbabwe) Cara Black (India) Sania Mirza
- Score: 7–6^{(7–5)}, 6–2

Events
Singles	men	women
Doubles	men	women
- BNP Paribas Open

Ekaterina Makarova and Elena Vesnina were the defending champions, but lost in the quarterfinals to Cara Black and Sania Mirza.
Hsieh Su-wei and Peng Shuai won the title, defeating Black and Mirza in the final, 7–6^{(7–5)}, 6–2.

== Seeds ==
1. (Chinese Taipei) Hsieh Su-wei / (China) Peng Shuai (champions)
2. (Russia) Ekaterina Makarova / (Russia) Elena Vesnina (quarterfinals)
3. (Italy) Sara Errani / (Italy) Roberta Vinci (first round)
4. (Czech Republic) Květa Peschke / (Slovenia) Katarina Srebotnik (quarterfinals)
5. (Zimbabwe) Cara Black / (India) Sania Mirza (final)
6. (Czech Republic) Andrea Hlaváčková / (Czech Republic) Lucie Šafářová (first round)
7. (Australia) Ashleigh Barty / (Australia) Casey Dellacqua (quarterfinals)
8. (Czech Republic) Lucie Hradecká / (China) Zheng Jie (semifinals)

== Draw ==
Key

- Q = Qualifier
- WC = Wild card
- LL = Lucky loser
- Alt = Alternate
- ITF = ITF entry
- PR = Protected ranking
- SR = Special ranking
- SE = Special exempt
- JE = Junior exempt
- JR = Junior Accelerator Programme entrant
- CO = College Accelerator Programme entrant
- NG = Next Gen Accelerator Program entrant
- w/o = Walkover
- r = Retired
- d = Defaulted

=== Finals ===
Semifinals
1	(Chinese Taipei) Hsieh Su-wei (China) Peng Shuai	3	7^{7}	[10]
WC	(Russia) Svetlana Kuznetsova (Australia) Samantha Stosur	6	6^{5}	[2]
8	(Czech Republic) Lucie Hradecká (China) Zheng Jie	4	6	[7]
5	(Zimbabwe) Cara Black (India) Sania Mirza	6	3	[10]

Final
1	(Chinese Taipei) Hsieh Su-wei (China) Peng Shuai	7^{7}	6
5	(Zimbabwe) Cara Black (India) Sania Mirza	6^{5}	2

=== Top half ===
First round
1	(Chinese Taipei) S-w Hsieh (China) S Peng	6	6
(Japan) S Aoyama (Georgia (country)) O Kalashnikova	1	2
(Russia) A Kleybanova (Russia) A Pavlyuchenkova	7^{7}	6
Alt	(Spain) S Soler Espinosa (Poland) A Rosolska	6^{5}	1
(Slovakia) J Husárová (Russia) V Zvonareva	4	6	[2]
(Slovakia) D Hantuchová (Spain) A Parra Santonja	6	4	[10]
WC	(Switzerland) M Hingis (Germany) S Lisicki	4	7^{7}	[6]
7	(Australia) A Barty (Australia) C Dellacqua	6	6^{0}	[10]
3	(Italy) S Errani (Italy) R Vinci	3	6	6
WC	(Russia) S Kuznetsova (Australia) S Stosur	6	3	[10]
(Poland) K Jans-Ignacik (Czech Republic) I Melzer	4	6^{8}
(Spain) A Medina Garrigues (Kazakhstan) Y Shvedova	6	7^{10}
(Russia) A Kudryavtseva (Australia) A Rodionova	2	4
(France) K Mladenovic (Italy) F Pennetta	6	6
(Japan) K Date-Krumm (Czech Republic) B Záhlavová-Strýcová	6	7
6	(Czech Republic) A Hlaváčková (Czech Republic) L Šafářová	2	5

Second round
1	(Chinese Taipei) S-w Hsieh (China) S Peng	6	6
(Russia) A Kleybanova (Russia) A Pavlyuchenkova	1	2
(Slovakia) D Hantuchová (Spain) A Parra Santonja	1	3
7	(Australia) A Barty (Australia) C Dellacqua	6	6
WC	(Russia) S Kuznetsova (Australia) S Stosur	7	6
(Spain) A Medina Garrigues (Kazakhstan) Y Shvedova	5	1
(France) K Mladenovic (Italy) F Pennetta	7^{7}	2	[5]
(Japan) K Date-Krumm (Czech Republic) B Záhlavová-Strýcová	6^{5}	6	[10]

Quarterfinals
1	(Chinese Taipei) S-w Hsieh (China) S Peng	6	6
7	(Australia) A Barty (Australia) C Dellacqua	3	4
WC	(Russia) S Kuznetsova (Australia) S Stosur	1	6	[10]
(Japan) K Date-Krumm (Czech Republic) B Záhlavová-Strýcová	6	3	[6]

Semifinals
1	(Chinese Taipei) S-w Hsieh (China) S Peng	3	7^{7}	[10]
WC	(Russia) S Kuznetsova (Australia) S Stosur	6	6^{5}	[2]

=== Bottom half ===
First round
8	(Czech Republic) L Hradecká (China) J Zheng	0	6	[10]
(United States) V King (Kazakhstan) G Voskoboeva	6	1	[8]
WC	(Germany) A Petkovic (United States) S Stephens	4	6^{5}
(Russia) V Dushevina (Croatia) M Lučić-Baroni	6	7^{7}
(New Zealand) M Erakovic (Croatia) P Martić	7^{7}	6
(Romania) M Niculescu (Czech Republic) K Zakopalová	6^{2}	4
(Hungary) T Babos (Serbia) J Janković	6^{8}	3
4	(Czech Republic) K Peschke (Slovenia) K Srebotnik	7^{10}	6
5	(Zimbabwe) C Black (India) S Mirza	6	6
WC	(United States) M Keys (United States) A Riske	2	4
Alt	(Canada) S Fichman (United States) M Moulton-Levy	6^{4}	2
(United States) R Kops-Jones (United States) A Spears	7^{7}	6
(Germany) J Görges (Germany) A-L Grönefeld	6	6
(Chinese Taipei) C-j Chuang (South Africa) C Scheepers	4	4
(Chinese Taipei) H-c Chan (United States) L Huber	7^{7}	4	[8]
2	(Russia) E Makarova (Russia) E Vesnina	6^{5}	6	[10]

Second round
8	(Czech Republic) L Hradecká (China) J Zheng	6	7
(Russia) V Dushevina (Croatia) M Lučić-Baroni	3	5
(New Zealand) M Erakovic (Croatia) P Martić	6^{1}	2
4	(Czech Republic) K Peschke (Slovenia) K Srebotnik	7^{7}	6
5	(Zimbabwe) C Black (India) S Mirza	6	6
(United States) R Kops-Jones (United States) A Spears	3	4
(Germany) J Görges (Germany) A-L Grönefeld	3	4
2	(Russia) E Makarova (Russia) E Vesnina	6	6

Quarterfinals
8	(Czech Republic) L Hradecká (China) J Zheng	7	5	[10]
4	(Czech Republic) K Peschke (Slovenia) K Srebotnik	5	7	[3]
5	(Zimbabwe) C Black (India) S Mirza	6	6
2	(Russia) E Makarova (Russia) E Vesnina	4	1

Semifinals
8	(Czech Republic) L Hradecká (China) J Zheng	4	6	[7]
5	(Zimbabwe) C Black (India) S Mirza	6	3	[10]
