= 2013 BNP Paribas Open – Men's singles =

Men's singles
- 2013 BNP Paribas Open

Final
- Champion: (Spain) Rafael Nadal
- Runner-up: (Argentina) Juan Martín del Potro
- Score: 4–6, 6–3, 6–4

Details
- Draw: 96
- Seeds: 32

Events
Singles	men	women
Doubles	men	women
- Indian Wells Masters

Rafael Nadal defeated Juan Martín del Potro in the final, 4–6, 6–3, 6–4 to win the men's singles tennis title at the 2013 Indian Wells Masters. It was Nadal's third Indian Wells singles title, his record 22nd ATP Tour Masters 1000 title, and his 53rd title overall.

Roger Federer was the defending champion,. but lost to Nadal in the quarterfinals.

== Seeds ==
All seeds receive a bye into the second round.

1. (Serbia) Novak Djokovic (semifinals)
2. (Switzerland) Roger Federer (quarterfinals)
3. (United Kingdom) Andy Murray (quarterfinals)
4. (Spain) David Ferrer (second round)
5. (Spain) Rafael Nadal (champion)
6. (Czech Republic) Tomáš Berdych (semifinals)
7. (Argentina) Juan Martín del Potro (final)
8. (France) Jo-Wilfried Tsonga (quarterfinals)
9. (Serbia) Janko Tipsarević (second round)
10. (France) Richard Gasquet (fourth round)
11. (Spain) Nicolás Almagro (third round)
12. (Croatia) Marin Čilić (third round)
13. (France) Gilles Simon (fourth round)
14. (Argentina) Juan Mónaco (second round)
15. (United States) John Isner (second round)
16. (Japan) Kei Nishikori (third round)
17. (Canada) Milos Raonic (fourth round)
18. (Switzerland) Stanislas Wawrinka (fourth round)
19. (Germany) Tommy Haas (fourth round)
20. (Italy) Andreas Seppi (third round)
21. (Germany) Philipp Kohlschreiber (second round)
22. (Ukraine) Alexandr Dolgopolov (second round)
23. (United States) Sam Querrey (fourth round)
24. (Poland) Jerzy Janowicz (third round)
25. (France) Jérémy Chardy (second round)
26. (Slovakia) Martin Kližan (second round)
27. (Germany) Florian Mayer (third round)
28. (France) Julien Benneteau (second round)
29. (Spain) Fernando Verdasco (second round)
30. (Russia) Mikhail Youzhny (second round)
31. (Bulgaria) Grigor Dimitrov (third round)
32. (United States) Mardy Fish (third round)

== Draw ==
Key

- Q = Qualifier
- WC = Wild card
- LL = Lucky loser
- Alt = Alternate
- ITF = ITF entry
- PR = Protected ranking
- SR = Special ranking
- SE = Special exempt
- JE = Junior exempt
- JR = Junior Accelerator Programme entrant
- CO = College Accelerator Programme entrant
- NG = Next Gen Accelerator Program entrant
- w/o = Walkover
- r = Retired
- d = Defaulted

=== Finals ===
Quarterfinals
1	(Serbia) Novak Djokovic	6	6
8	(France) Jo-Wilfried Tsonga	3	1
3	(United Kingdom) Andy Murray	7^{7}	3	1
7	(Argentina) Juan Martín del Potro	6^{5}	6	6
6	(Czech Republic) Tomáš Berdych	6	6
(South Africa) Kevin Anderson	4	4
5	(Spain) Rafael Nadal	6	6
2	(Switzerland) Roger Federer	4	2

Semifinals
1	(Serbia) Novak Djokovic	6	4	4
7	(Argentina) Juan Martín del Potro	4	6	6
6	(Czech Republic) Tomáš Berdych	4	5
5	(Spain) Rafael Nadal	6	7

Final
7	(Argentina) Juan Martín del Potro	6	3	4
5	(Spain) Rafael Nadal	4	6	6

=== Top half ===
==== Section 1 ====
First round
(Italy) F Fognini	6	6
(Slovenia) A Bedene	4	3
Q	(Australia) M Ebden	6	4	6
(Russia) A Kuznetsov	3	6	4
WC	(United States) J Sock	6	6^{8}	2
Q	(Croatia) I Karlović	3	7^{10}	6
(Australia) M Matosevic	7	6
WC	(Spain) T Robredo	5	2

Second round
1	(Serbia) N Djokovic	6	5	6
(Italy) F Fognini	0	7	2
Q	(Australia) M Ebden	4	4
31	(Bulgaria) G Dimitrov	6	6
23	(United States) S Querrey	6	6
Q	(Croatia) I Karlović	3	4
(Australia) M Matosevic	7	6
14	(Argentina) J Mónaco	5	0

Third round
1	(Serbia) N Djokovic	7^{7}	6
31	(Bulgaria) G Dimitrov	6^{4}	1
23	(United States) S Querrey	7^{7}	6^{7}	7
(Australia) M Matosevic	6^{5}	7^{9}	5

Fourth round
1	(Serbia) N Djokovic	6	7^{8}
23	(United States) S Querrey	0	6^{6}

==== Section 2 ====
First round
(Argentina) H Zeballos	3	3
(Spain) A Ramos	6	6
Q	(Spain) D Muñoz de la Nava	5	3
(France) M Llodra	7	6
(Germany) B Becker	3	6	4
Q	(United States) B Reynolds	6	3	6
WC	(United States) J Blake	6	6
(Netherlands) R Haase	3	4

Second round
12	(Croatia) M Čilić	7^{9}	6
(Spain) A Ramos	6^{7}	2
(France) M Llodra
17	(Canada) M Raonic	w/o
32	(United States) M Fish	6	3	6
Q	(United States) B Reynolds	3	6	4
WC	(United States) J Blake	6^{6}	4
8	(France) J-W Tsonga	7^{8}	6

Third round
12	(Croatia) M Čilić	6	4	3
17	(Canada) M Raonic	3	6	6
32	(United States) M Fish	6^{4}	6^{0}
8	(France) J-W Tsonga	7^{7}	7^{7}

Fourth round
17	(Canada) M Raonic	6	5	4
8	(France) J-W Tsonga	4	7	6

==== Section 3 ====
First round
(Russia) E Donskoy	6	6
(Japan) T Ito	2	1
(Chinese Taipei) Y-h Lu	2	6	6
WC	(United States) T Smyczek	6	2	2
(Colombia) S Giraldo	0	6	5
(Argentina) C Berlocq	6	2	7
Q	(Russia) D Tursunov	4	4
Q	(Germany) P Petzschner	6	6

Second round
3	(United Kingdom) A Murray	5	6	6
(Russia) E Donskoy	7	2	2
(Chinese Taipei) Y-h Lu	7^{7}	7^{7}
26	(Slovakia) M Kližan	6^{5}	6^{5}
22	(Ukraine) A Dolgopolov	3	7^{7}	3
(Argentina) C Berlocq	6	6^{5}	6
Q	(Germany) P Petzschner	3	2
16	(Japan) K Nishikori	6	6

Third round
3	(United Kingdom) A Murray	6	6
(Chinese Taipei) Y-h Lu	3	2
(Argentina) C Berlocq	6	6
16	(Japan) K Nishikori	2	2

Fourth round
3	(United Kingdom) A Murray	7^{7}	6
(Argentina) C Berlocq	6^{4}	4

==== Section 4 ====
First round
(Slovakia) L Lacko	1	4
(Spain) D Gimeno Traver	6	6
(Spain) P Andújar	2	6	6
WC	(United States) S Johnson	6	1	4
(Germany) B Phau	7^{7}	6
(Colombia) A Falla	6^{1}	2
(Russia) N Davydenko	7^{7}	6
(France) P-H Mathieu	6^{1}	2

Second round
11	(Spain) N Almagro	7	6
(Spain) D Gimeno Traver	5	1
(Spain) P Andújar	3	6^{0}
19	(Germany) T Haas	6	7^{7}
25	(France) J Chardy	2	6	4
(Germany) B Phau	6	2	6
(Russia) N Davydenko	3	4
7	(Argentina) JM del Potro	6	6

Third round
11	(Spain) N Almagro	3	7^{7}	6^{2}
19	(Germany) T Haas	6	6^{2}	7^{7}
(Germany) B Phau	2	5
7	(Argentina) JM del Potro	6	7

Fourth round
19	(Germany) T Haas	1	2
7	(Argentina) JM del Potro	6	6

=== Bottom half ===
==== Section 5 ====
First round
Q	(Germany) M Zverev	3	6	7^{7}
(Austria) J Melzer	6	3	6^{3}
(Serbia) V Troicki	6	3	4
(Belgium) D Goffin	4	6	6
(Spain) M Granollers	4	2
(Argentina) D Nalbandian	6	6
(Brazil) T Bellucci	4	3
(Australia) B Tomic	6	6

Second round
6	(Czech Republic) T Berdych	6	6
Q	(Germany) M Zverev	2	4
(Belgium) D Goffin	4	2
27	(Germany) F Mayer	6	6
24	(Poland) J Janowicz	7^{7}	4	6
(Argentina) D Nalbandian	6^{4}	6	3
(Australia) B Tomic	6^{1}	2
10	(France) R Gasquet	7^{7}	6

Third round
6	(Czech Republic) T Berdych	6	6
27	(Germany) F Mayer	4	1
24	(Poland) J Janowicz	1	4
10	(France) R Gasquet	6	6

Fourth round
6	(Czech Republic) T Berdych	6	7
10	(France) R Gasquet	1	5

==== Section 6 ====
First round
(Luxembourg) G Müller	5	4
(Italy) P Lorenzi	7	6
(Poland) Ł Kubot	7	5	2
(France) B Paire	5	7	6
(Finland) J Nieminen	4	6	6
(Netherlands) I Sijsling	6	3	3
(Romania) V Hănescu	6^{6}	3
(South Africa) K Anderson	7^{8}	6

Second round
13	(France) G Simon	6	3	7
(Italy) P Lorenzi	3	6	5
(France) B Paire	6	6
21	(Germany) P Kohlschreiber	4	2
29	(Spain) F Verdasco	1	0
(Finland) J Nieminen	6	6
(South Africa) K Anderson	3	6	6
4	(Spain) D Ferrer	6	4	3

Third round
13	(France) G Simon	3	7^{7}	6
(France) B Paire	6	6^{5}	4
(Finland) J Nieminen	3	1
(South Africa) K Anderson	6	6

Fourth round
13	(France) G Simon	3	6	4
(South Africa) K Anderson	6	1	6

==== Section 7 ====
First round
(Japan) G Soeda	0	6	3
(United States) R Harrison	6	4	6
(Argentina) L Mayer	6	3	6
(Belgium) X Malisse	2	6	4
Q	(Germany) D Brands	6	7^{7}
(Cyprus) M Baghdatis	0	6^{3}
Q	(Latvia) E Gulbis	6	6
(Spain) F López	3	2

Second round
5	(Spain) R Nadal	7^{7}	6
(United States) R Harrison	6^{3}	2
(Argentina) L Mayer	6	6
30	(Russia) M Youzhny	2	3
20	(Italy) A Seppi	7	6
Q	(Germany) D Brands	5	4
Q	(Latvia) E Gulbis	6	6
9	(Serbia) J Tipsarević	2	0

Third round
5	(Spain) R Nadal	w/o
(Argentina) L Mayer
20	(Italy) A Seppi	7	3	4
Q	(Latvia) E Gulbis	5	6	6

Fourth round
5	(Spain) R Nadal	4	6	7
Q	(Latvia) E Gulbis	6	4	5

==== Section 8 ====
First round
(Australia) L Hewitt	6	3	6
(Czech Republic) L Rosol	4	6	1
Q	(United States) W Odesnik	7	7
(Spain) R Bautista Agut	5	5
Q	(Argentina) G Pella	1	2
(Croatia) I Dodig	6	6
Q	(Canada) V Pospisil	6^{5}	3
(Uzbekistan) D Istomin	7^{7}	6

Second round
15	(United States) J Isner	7^{8}	3	4
(Australia) L Hewitt	6^{6}	6	6
Q	(United States) W Odesnik	6	2	1
18	(Switzerland) S Wawrinka	3	6	6
28	(France) J Benneteau	4	2
(Croatia) I Dodig	6	6
(Uzbekistan) D Istomin	2	3
2	(Switzerland) R Federer	6	6

Third round
(Australia) L Hewitt	4	5
18	(Switzerland) S Wawrinka	6	7
(Croatia) I Dodig	3	1
2	(Switzerland) R Federer	6	6

Fourth round
18	(Switzerland) S Wawrinka	3	7^{7}	5
2	(Switzerland) R Federer	6	6^{4}	7

== Qualifying ==
=== Seeds ===
1. (Latvia) Ernests Gulbis (qualified)
2. (United States) Michael Russell (qualifying competition)
3. (Germany) Daniel Brands (qualified)
4. (Russia) Dmitry Tursunov (qualified)
5. (France) Édouard Roger-Vasselin (first round)
6. (Lithuania) Ričardas Berankis (qualifying competition)
7. (Germany) Tobias Kamke (first round)
8. (France) Guillaume Rufin (qualifying competition, withdrew because of a lower back injury)
9. (Portugal) João Sousa (first round)
10. (Czech Republic) Jan Hájek (first round)
11. (Canada) Jesse Levine (qualifying competition)
12. (United States) Rajeev Ram (first round)
13. (Argentina) Guido Pella (qualified)
14. (Belgium) Steve Darcis (first round)
15. (Italy) Flavio Cipolla (first round)
16. (Ukraine) Sergiy Stakhovsky (qualifying competition)
17. (Germany) Matthias Bachinger (first round)
18. (Romania) Adrian Ungur (first round)
19. (Australia) Matthew Ebden (qualified)
20. (Austria) Andreas Haider-Maurer (first round)
21. (Belgium) Ruben Bemelmans (first round)
22. (Germany) Philipp Petzschner (qualified)
23. (Italy) Matteo Viola (qualifying competition)
24. (Canada) Vasek Pospisil (qualified)

=== Qualifiers ===
1. (Latvia) Ernests Gulbis
2. (United States) Bobby Reynolds
3. (Germany) Daniel Brands
4. (Russia) Dmitry Tursunov
5. (Germany) Mischa Zverev
6. (Canada) Vasek Pospisil
7. (Australia) Matthew Ebden
8. (Germany) Philipp Petzschner
9. (Spain) Daniel Muñoz de la Nava
10. (Argentina) Guido Pella
11. (Croatia) Ivo Karlović
12. (United States) Wayne Odesnik

=== Qualifying draw ===
Key

- Q = Qualifier
- WC = Wild card
- LL = Lucky loser
- Alt = Alternate
- ITF = ITF entry
- PR = Protected ranking
- SR = Special ranking
- SE = Special exempt
- JE = Junior exempt
- JR = Junior Accelerator Programme entrant
- CO = College Accelerator Programme entrant
- NG = Next Gen Accelerator Program entrant
- w/o = Walkover
- r = Retired
- d = Defaulted

==== First qualifier ====
First round
1	(Latvia) Ernests Gulbis	6^{5}	6	6
WC	(United States) Christian Harrison	7^{7}	2	4
(Belgium) Olivier Rochus	6	6
21	(Belgium) Ruben Bemelmans	2	4

Qualifying competition
1	(Latvia) Ernests Gulbis	6	3	6
(Belgium) Olivier Rochus	1	6	2

==== Second qualifier ====
First round
2	(United States) Michael Russell	6	7^{7}
(Russia) Igor Kunitsyn	1	6^{5}
WC	(United States) Bobby Reynolds	6	6
15	(Italy) Flavio Cipolla	4	1

Qualifying competition
2	(United States) Michael Russell	5	6	6^{4}
WC	(United States) Bobby Reynolds	7	3	7^{7}

==== Third qualifier ====
First round
3	(Germany) Daniel Brands	6	6
(Ukraine) Ivan Sergeyev	3	4
WC	(South Africa) Rik de Voest	6	6
14	(Belgium) Steve Darcis	3	2

Qualifying competition
3	(Germany) Daniel Brands	6	7
WC	(South Africa) Rik de Voest	2	5

==== Fourth qualifier ====
First round
4	(Russia) Dmitry Tursunov	6	6
WC	(Tunisia) Mohamed Haythem Abid	1	4
(Brazil) Thiago Alves	6	2	6
20	(Austria) Andreas Haider-Maurer	4	6	3

Qualifying competition
4	(Russia) Dmitry Tursunov	5	6	6
(Brazil) Thiago Alves	7	2	3

==== Fifth qualifier ====
First round
5	(France) Édouard Roger-Vasselin	6^{6}	5
(Germany) Mischa Zverev	7^{8}	7
(Portugal) Gastão Elias	6^{6}	5
16	(Ukraine) Sergiy Stakhovsky	7^{8}	7

Qualifying competition
(Germany) Mischa Zverev	6	6
16	(Ukraine) Sergiy Stakhovsky	4	0

==== Sixth qualifier ====
First round
6	(Lithuania) Ričardas Berankis	7^{7}	6
(United States) Rhyne Williams	6^{2}	1
(Belgium) Maxime Authom	3	0
24	(Canada) Vasek Pospisil	6	6

Qualifying competition
6	(Lithuania) Ričardas Berankis	1	2
24	(Canada) Vasek Pospisil	6	6

==== Seventh qualifier ====
First round
7	(Germany) Tobias Kamke	4	0
(Canada) Frank Dancevic	6	6
(Kazakhstan) Andrey Golubev	7^{8}	4	2
19	(Australia) Matthew Ebden	6^{6}	6	6

Qualifying competition
(Canada) Frank Dancevic	3	6^{7}
19	(Australia) Matthew Ebden	6	7^{9}

==== Eighth qualifier ====
First round
8	(France) Guillaume Rufin	6	3	6
WC	(United States) Dennis Novikov	4	6	1
(Ukraine) Illya Marchenko	3	4
22	(Germany) Philipp Petzschner	6	6

Qualifying competition
8	(France) Guillaume Rufin
22	(Germany) Philipp Petzschner	w/o

==== Ninth qualifier ====
First round
9	(Portugal) João Sousa	3	6	3
(Spain) Daniel Muñoz de la Nava	6	3	6
(Belarus) Uladzimir Ignatik	6	6
17	(Germany) Matthias Bachinger	4	2

Qualifying competition
(Spain) Daniel Muñoz de la Nava	6	6
(Belarus) Uladzimir Ignatik	4	3

==== Tenth qualifier ====
First round
10	(Czech Republic) Jan Hájek	6^{6}	2
(Germany) Michael Berrer	7^{8}	6
(Russia) Alex Bogomolov Jr.	2	4
13	(Argentina) Guido Pella	6	6

Qualifying competition
(Germany) Michael Berrer	4	6^{5}
13	(Argentina) Guido Pella	6	7^{7}

==== Eleventh qualifier ====
First round
11	(Canada) Jesse Levine	6	3	6
(United States) Denis Kudla	0	6	3
(Croatia) Ivo Karlović	7^{8}	7^{7}
18	(Romania) Adrian Ungur	6^{6}	6^{3}

Qualifying competition
11	(Canada) Jesse Levine	2	5
(Croatia) Ivo Karlović	6	7

==== Twelfth qualifier ====
First round
12	(United States) Rajeev Ram	3	6^{4}
(United States) Wayne Odesnik	6	7^{7}
PR	(India) Somdev Devvarman	2	2
23	(Italy) Matteo Viola	6	6

Qualifying competition
(United States) Wayne Odesnik	7^{7}	4	7^{8}
23	(Italy) Matteo Viola	6^{2}	6	6^{6}
