= 2014 BNP Paribas Open – Women's singles =

Women's singles
- 2014 BNP Paribas Open

Final
- Champion: (Italy) Flavia Pennetta
- Runner-up: (Poland) Agnieszka Radwańska
- Score: 6–2, 6–1

Details
- Draw: 96
- Seeds: 32

Events
Singles	men	women
Doubles	men	women
- Indian Wells Open

Flavia Pennetta defeated Agnieszka Radwańska in the final, 6–2, 6–1 to win the women's singles tennis title at the 2014 Indian Wells Masters. It was her 10th WTA Tour singles title.

Maria Sharapova was the defending champion, but lost in the third round to Camila Giorgi.

== Seeds ==
All seeds receive a bye into the second round.

1. (China) Li Na (semifinals)
2. (Poland) Agnieszka Radwańska (final)
3. (Belarus) Victoria Azarenka (second round)
4. (Russia) Maria Sharapova (third round)
5. (Germany) Angelique Kerber (second round)
6. (Romania) Simona Halep (semifinals)
7. (Serbia) Jelena Janković (quarterfinals)
8. (Czech Republic) Petra Kvitová (fourth round)
9. (Italy) Sara Errani (third round)
10. (Denmark) Caroline Wozniacki (fourth round)
11. (Serbia) Ana Ivanovic (third round)
12. (Slovakia) Dominika Cibulková (quarterfinals)
13. (Italy) Roberta Vinci (third round)
14. (Spain) Carla Suárez Navarro (third round)
15. (Germany) Sabine Lisicki (second round)
16. (Australia) Samantha Stosur (third round)
17. (United States) Sloane Stephens (quarterfinals)
18. (Canada) Eugenie Bouchard (fourth round)
19. (Belgium) Kirsten Flipkens (second round)
20. (Italy) Flavia Pennetta (champion)
21. (Russia) Anastasia Pavlyuchenkova (third round)
22. (France) Alizé Cornet (fourth round)
23. (Russia) Ekaterina Makarova (third round)
24. (Estonia) Kaia Kanepi (second round)
25. (Romania) Sorana Cîrstea (second round)
26. (Czech Republic) Lucie Šafářová (third round)
27. (Russia) Svetlana Kuznetsova (third round)
28. (Czech Republic) Klára Zakopalová (second round)
29. (Slovakia) Daniela Hantuchová (second round)
30. (Russia) Elena Vesnina (second round)
31. (Slovakia) Magdaléna Rybáriková (third round)
32. (Spain) Garbiñe Muguruza (second round)

Click on the seed number of a player to go to their draw section.

== Draw ==
Key

- Q = Qualifier
- WC = Wild card
- LL = Lucky loser
- Alt = Alternate
- ITF = ITF entry
- PR = Protected ranking
- SR = Special ranking
- SE = Special exempt
- JE = Junior exempt
- JR = Junior Accelerator Programme entrant
- CO = College Accelerator Programme entrant
- NG = Next Gen Accelerator Program entrant
- w/o = Walkover
- r = Retired
- d = Defaulted

=== Finals ===
Quarterfinals
1	(China) Li Na	6	4	6
12	(Slovakia) Dominika Cibulková	3	6	3
20	(Italy) Flavia Pennetta	6	5	6
17	(United States) Sloane Stephens	4	7	4
6	(Romania) Simona Halep	6	6
Q	(Australia) Casey Dellacqua	2	2
7	(Serbia) Jelena Janković	5	6	4
2	(Poland) Agnieszka Radwańska	7	2	6

Semifinals
1	(China) Li Na	6^{5}	3
20	(Italy) Flavia Pennetta	7^{7}	6
6	(Romania) Simona Halep	3	4
2	(Poland) Agnieszka Radwańska	6	6

Final
20	(Italy) Flavia Pennetta	6	6
2	(Poland) Agnieszka Radwańska	2	1

=== Top half ===
==== Section 1 ====
First round
(Argentina) P Ormaechea	6	3	6^{5}
(China) J Zheng	3	6	7^{7}
(Czech Republic) Ka Plíšková	6	3	6
Q	(Portugal) M Larcher de Brito	2	6	2
(United States) B Mattek-Sands	3	5
(France) C Garcia	6	7
(Poland) U Radwańska	2	0
PR	(Canada) A Wozniak	6	6

Second round
1	(China) N Li	6	7
(China) J Zheng	1	5
(Czech Republic) Ka Plíšková	7	6
28	(Czech Republic) K Zakopalová	5	2
21	(Russia) A Pavlyuchenkova	6	7
(France) C Garcia	4	5
PR	(Canada) A Wozniak	7	1	7^{7}
15	(Germany) S Lisicki	5	6	6^{5}

Third round
1	(China) N Li	6	6
(Czech Republic) Ka Plíšková	3	4
21	(Russia) A Pavlyuchenkova	1	7^{7}	0
PR	(Canada) A Wozniak	6	6^{3}	6

Fourth round
1	(China) N Li	6	6
PR	(Canada) A Wozniak	1	4

==== Section 2 ====
First round
Q	(Australia) O Rogowska	0	5
WC	(Croatia) D Vekić	6	7
(Romania) M Niculescu	6	6
(New Zealand) M Erakovic	2	2
(United States) V King	0	6	2
Q	(Czech Republic) B Záhlavová-Strýcová	6	3	6
WC	(United States) C Vandeweghe	6	6
(Romania) A Cadanțu	4	0

Second round
12	(Slovakia) D Cibulková	6	6
WC	(Croatia) D Vekić	3	2
(Romania) M Niculescu	7	6^{3}	3
23	(Russia) E Makarova	5	7^{7}	6
27	(Russia) S Kuznetsova	6	6
Q	(Czech Republic) B Záhlavová-Strýcová	3	3
WC	(United States) C Vandeweghe	1	3
8	(Czech Republic) P Kvitová	6	6

Third round
12	(Slovakia) D Cibulková	6	7
23	(Russia) E Makarova	4	5
27	(Russia) S Kuznetsova	3	6	0
8	(Czech Republic) P Kvitová	6	2	6

Fourth round
12	(Slovakia) D Cibulková	6	6
8	(Czech Republic) P Kvitová	3	2

==== Section 3 ====
First round
(Slovakia) J Čepelová	1	6	3
(Germany) J Görges	6	2	6
Q	(Italy) C Giorgi	6^{5}	6	6
(Germany) A Petkovic	7^{7}	3	3
WC	(United States) T Townsend	7^{7}	6
(Italy) K Knapp	6^{1}	1
(Italy) F Schiavone	3	6	6
(Germany) M Barthel	6	2	2

Second round
4	(Russia) M Sharapova	6	6
(Germany) J Görges	1	4
Q	(Italy) C Giorgi	7^{7}	6
25	(Romania) S Cîrstea	6^{3}	3
20	(Italy) F Pennetta	6	6^{4}	6
WC	(United States) T Townsend	3	7^{7}	3
(Italy) F Schiavone	2	3
16	(Australia) S Stosur	6	6

Third round
4	(Russia) M Sharapova	3	6	5
Q	(Italy) C Giorgi	6	4	7
20	(Italy) F Pennetta	6	3	6
16	(Australia) S Stosur	4	6	1

Fourth round
Q	(Italy) C Giorgi	2	1
20	(Italy) F Pennetta	6	6

==== Section 4 ====
First round
(Ukraine) E Svitolina	6	7
(Puerto Rico) M Puig	4	5
(Croatia) A Tomljanović	6	7^{7}
(Spain) L Domínguez Lino	4	6^{2}
PR	(Russia) A Kleybanova	5	6	6
WC	(United States) V Duval	7	4	4
(Kazakhstan) G Voskoboeva	1	0^{r}
(Spain) MT Torró Flor^{[a]}	6	1

Second round
11	(Serbia) A Ivanovic	4	7	7^{7}
(Ukraine) E Svitolina	6	5	6^{1}
(Croatia) A Tomljanović	4	0
17	(United States) S Stephens	6	6
32	(Spain) G Muguruza	3	2
PR	(Russia) A Kleybanova	6	6
(Spain) MT Torró Flor	2	7^{7}	6
5	(Germany) A Kerber	6	6^{5}	4

Third round
11	(Serbia) A Ivanovic	6^{3}	4
17	(United States) S Stephens	7^{7}	6
PR	(Russia) A Kleybanova	6	6
(Spain) MT Torró Flor	1	3

Fourth round
17	(United States) S Stephens	6	7
PR	(Russia) A Kleybanova	3	5

=== Bottom half ===
==== Section 5 ====
First round
Q	(United States) A Kiick	4	0
(Japan) K Nara	6	6
Q	(Slovakia) A Schmiedlová	6	2	4
(Belgium) Y Wickmayer	3	6	6
WC	(Russia) V Zvonareva	6	0	5
(China) S Peng	4	6	7
(Israel) S Pe'er	6	3	4
Q	(Canada) S Fichman	4	6	6

Second round
6	(Romania) S Halep	6	6
(Japan) K Nara	2	2
(Belgium) Y Wickmayer	3	4
26	(Czech Republic) L Šafářová	6	6
18	(Canada) E Bouchard	6	6
(China) S Peng	2	2
Q	(Canada) S Fichman	1	1
9	(Italy) S Errani	6	6

Third round
6	(Romania) S Halep	6	4	6
26	(Czech Republic) L Šafářová	2	6	4
18	(Canada) E Bouchard	6	6
9	(Italy) S Errani	3	3

Fourth round
6	(Romania) S Halep	6	1	6
18	(Canada) E Bouchard	2	6	4

==== Section 6 ====
First round
(United States) M Keys	6	6
(Bulgaria) T Pironkova	2	1
Q	(Australia) C Dellacqua	7^{7}	6
(United States) C McHale	6^{4}	4
Q	(Belgium) A Van Uytvanck	2	2
(United States) V Lepchenko	6	6
(United States) L Davis	6	6
Q	(Chinese Taipei) Y-j Chan	4	3

Second round
13	(Italy) R Vinci	6	6
(United States) M Keys	3	3
Q	(Australia) C Dellacqua	1	6	6
19	(Belgium) K Flipkens	6	3	1
29	(Slovakia) D Hantuchová	3	2
(United States) V Lepchenko	6	6
(United States) L Davis	6	7^{7}
3	(Belarus) V Azarenka	0	6^{2}

Third round
13	(Italy) R Vinci	6	4	3
Q	(Australia) C Dellacqua	4	6	6
(United States) V Lepchenko	3	2
(United States) L Davis	6	6

Fourth round
Q	(Australia) C Dellacqua^{[b]}	w/o
(United States) L Davis

==== Section 7 ====
First round
(Austria) Y Meusburger	6	6
PR	(Czech Republic) I Melzer	4	2
WC	(United States) S Rogers	6	6
PR	(Czech Republic) P Cetkovská	0	4
Q	(Kazakhstan) Y Shvedova	4	6	6
(South Africa) C Scheepers	6	4	3
(United States) A Riske	6	3	3
(Serbia) B Jovanovski	3	6	6

Second round
7	(Serbia) J Janković	6	6
(Austria) Y Meusburger	3	1
WC	(United States) S Rogers	4	3
31	(Slovakia) M Rybáriková	6	6
24	(Estonia) K Kanepi	3	2
Q	(Kazakhstan) Y Shvedova	6	6
(Serbia) B Jovanovski	1	3
10	(Denmark) C Wozniacki	6	6

Third round
7	(Serbia) J Janković	6	6
31	(Slovakia) M Rybáriková	3	2
Q	(Kazakhstan) Y Shvedova	6^{7}	6	1
10	(Denmark) C Wozniacki	7^{9}	3	6

Fourth round
7	(Serbia) J Janković	6	6
10	(Denmark) C Wozniacki	3	1

==== Section 8 ====
First round
(China) S Zhang	2	1
(France) K Mladenovic	6	6
WC	(Russia) N Petrova	1^{r}
(Spain) S Soler Espinosa^{[c]}	1
(Germany) A Beck	6	2	7
(Switzerland) S Vögele	2	6	5
WC	(Switzerland) B Bencic	5	4
Q	(United Kingdom) H Watson	7	6

Second round
14	(Spain) C Suárez Navarro	6	6
(France) K Mladenovic	3	3
(Spain) S Soler Espinosa	3	6	2
22	(France) A Cornet	6	4	6
30	(Russia) E Vesnina	2	6	3
(Germany) A Beck	6	3	6
Q	(United Kingdom) H Watson	4	3
2	(Poland) A Radwańska	6	6

Third round
14	(Spain) C Suárez Navarro	7^{7}	5	3
22	(France) A Cornet	6^{4}	7	6
(Germany) A Beck	0	0
2	(Poland) A Radwańska	6	6

Fourth round
22	(France) A Cornet	5	3
2	(Poland) A Radwańska	7	6

== Qualifying ==
=== Seeds ===
1. (Czech Republic) Barbora Záhlavová-Strýcová (qualified)
2. (Slovakia) Anna Schmiedlová (qualified)
3. (Kazakhstan) Yaroslava Shvedova (qualified)
4. (Australia) Casey Dellacqua (qualified)
5. (Italy) Camila Giorgi (qualified)
6. (Sweden) Johanna Larsson (qualifying competition, retired)
7. (France) Virginie Razzano (first round)
8. (Croatia) Mirjana Lučić-Baroni (first round)
9. (Israel) Julia Glushko (first round)
10. (Belarus) Olga Govortsova (first round)
11. (Spain) Anabel Medina Garrigues (first round)
12. (Hungary) Tímea Babos (first round)
13. (Japan) Kimiko Date-Krumm (qualifying competition)
14. (Spain) Estrella Cabeza Candela (first round)
15. (Japan) Misaki Doi (first round)
16. (Poland) Katarzyna Piter (first round)
17. (Croatia) Petra Martić (first round)
18. (Chinese Taipei) Hsieh Su-wei (first round)
19. (Luxembourg) Mandy Minella (first round)
20. (Thailand) Luksika Kumkhum (first round)
21. (Brazil) Teliana Pereira (qualifying competition)
22. (Belgium) Alison Van Uytvanck (qualified)
23. (Ukraine) Nadiia Kichenok (qualifying competition)
24. (Switzerland) Romina Oprandi (first round)

=== Qualifiers ===
1. (Czech Republic) Barbora Záhlavová-Strýcová
2. (Slovakia) Anna Schmiedlová
3. (Kazakhstan) Yaroslava Shvedova
4. (Australia) Casey Dellacqua
5. (Italy) Camila Giorgi
6. (Chinese Taipei) Chan Yung-jan
7. (United Kingdom) Heather Watson
8. (Portugal) Michelle Larcher de Brito
9. (Canada) Sharon Fichman
10. (Australia) Olivia Rogowska
11. (United States) Allie Kiick
12. (Belgium) Alison Van Uytvanck

=== Qualifying draw ===
Key

- Q = Qualifier
- WC = Wild card
- LL = Lucky loser
- Alt = Alternate
- ITF = ITF entry
- PR = Protected ranking
- SR = Special ranking
- SE = Special exempt
- JE = Junior exempt
- JR = Junior Accelerator Programme entrant
- CO = College Accelerator Programme entrant
- NG = Next Gen Accelerator Program entrant
- w/o = Walkover
- r = Retired
- d = Defaulted

==== First qualifier ====
First round
1	(Czech Republic) Barbora Záhlavová-Strýcová	7^{7}	6
WC	(United States) Grace Min	6^{4}	3
PR	(Netherlands) Michaëlla Krajicek	6	6
16	(Poland) Katarzyna Piter	2	1

Qualifying competition
1	(Czech Republic) Barbora Záhlavová-Strýcová	6	2	7^{7}
PR	(Netherlands) Michaëlla Krajicek	2	6	6^{4}

==== Second qualifier ====
First round
2	(Slovakia) Anna Schmiedlová	6	6
(Spain) Lara Arruabarrena	3	4
(Colombia) Mariana Duque Mariño	1	0
23	(Ukraine) Nadiia Kichenok	6	6

Qualifying competition
2	(Slovakia) Anna Schmiedlová	6	6
23	(Ukraine) Nadiia Kichenok	4	4

==== Third qualifier ====
First round
3	(Kazakhstan) Yaroslava Shvedova	3	6	6
(Poland) Magda Linette	6	4	4
(Czech Republic) Andrea Hlaváčková	5	4
13	(Japan) Kimiko Date-Krumm	7	6

Qualifying competition
3	(Kazakhstan) Yaroslava Shvedova	6	1	6
13	(Japan) Kimiko Date-Krumm	3	6	0

==== Fourth qualifier ====
First round
4	(Australia) Casey Dellacqua	6	4	6
(Georgia (country)) Anna Tatishvili	3	6	1
(United Kingdom) Johanna Konta	6	4	6
17	(Croatia) Petra Martić	3	6	3

Qualifying competition
4	(Australia) Casey Dellacqua	6	6
(United Kingdom) Johanna Konta	4	3

==== Fifth qualifier ====
First round
5	(Italy) Camila Giorgi	6	6
WC	(United States) Irina Falconi	1	1
WC	(United States) Madison Brengle	6	6
24	(Switzerland) Romina Oprandi	4	1

Qualifying competition
5	(Italy) Camila Giorgi	6	6
WC	(United States) Madison Brengle	2	2

==== Sixth qualifier ====
First round
6	(Sweden) Johanna Larsson	6	2	6
(Russia) Vera Dushevina	2	6	4
PR	(Chinese Taipei) Chan Yung-jan	4	7	6
14	(Spain) Estrella Cabeza Candela	6	5	1

Qualifying competition
6	(Sweden) Johanna Larsson	3^{r}
PR	(Chinese Taipei) Chan Yung-jan	4

==== Seventh qualifier ====
First round
7	(France) Virginie Razzano	1	4
WC	(United Kingdom) Heather Watson	6	6
(Kazakhstan) Yulia Putintseva	3	3
21	(Brazil) Teliana Pereira	6	6

Qualifying competition
WC	(United Kingdom) Heather Watson	6	6
21	(Brazil) Teliana Pereira	2	2

==== Eighth qualifier ====
First round
8	(Croatia) Mirjana Lučić-Baroni	6	1	6^{6}
(Slovenia) Tadeja Majerič	1	6	7^{8}
(Portugal) Michelle Larcher de Brito	3	7	6
15	(Japan) Misaki Doi	6	5	0

Qualifying competition
(Slovenia) Tadeja Majerič	5	7	3
(Portugal) Michelle Larcher de Brito	7	5	6

==== Ninth qualifier ====
First round
9	(Israel) Julia Glushko	4	1
(Ukraine) Maryna Zanevska	6	6
(Canada) Sharon Fichman	6	4	6
20	(Thailand) Luksika Kumkhum	3	6	3

Qualifying competition
(Ukraine) Maryna Zanevska	6	6^{1}	3
(Canada) Sharon Fichman	3	7^{7}	6

==== Tenth qualifier ====
First round
10	(Belarus) Olga Govortsova	3	4
(Australia) Olivia Rogowska	6	6
PR	(Hungary) Melinda Czink	7	4	6
18	(Chinese Taipei) Hsieh Su-wei	5	6	4

Qualifying competition
(Australia) Olivia Rogowska	6^{1}	6	6
PR	(Hungary) Melinda Czink	7^{7}	3	2

==== Eleventh qualifier ====
First round
11	(Spain) Anabel Medina Garrigues	5	1
(Belgium) An-Sophie Mestach	7	6
WC	(United States) Allie Kiick	6	6
19	(Luxembourg) Mandy Minella	3	0

Qualifying competition
(Belgium) An-Sophie Mestach	4	5
WC	(United States) Allie Kiick	6	7

==== Twelfth qualifier ====
First round
12	(Hungary) Tímea Babos	5	6	4
(Russia) Alla Kudryavtseva	7	3	6
WC	(Australia) Anastasia Rodionova	6	4	4
22	(Belgium) Alison Van Uytvanck	4	6	6

Qualifying competition
(Russia) Alla Kudryavtseva	2	2
22	(Belgium) Alison Van Uytvanck	6	6

== Notes ==
a. María Teresa Torró Flor advanced to the second round after Galina Voskoboeva was forced to retire in the second set with an upper respiratory infection.
b. Casey Dellacqua received a walkover into the quarterfinals after Lauren Davis withdrew from the tournament because of food poisoning.
c. Sílvia Soler Espinosa advanced to the second round after Nadia Petrova was forced to retire in the first set with a lower right leg injury.
