= Ana Ivanovic career statistics =

Career finals
Discipline	Type	Won	Lost	Total
Singles	Grand Slam	1	2	3
Singles	Summer Olympics	–	–	–
Singles	WTA Finals (Note: Formerly known as: Virginia Slims Championships (until 1995); WTA Tour Championships (until 2014))	–	–	–
Singles	WTA Elite (Note: Elite tier: WTA Tournament of Champions (2009–14); WTA Elite Trophy (2015–present))	2	0	2
Singles	WTA 1000 (Note: Formerly known as: Category 4 & 5 & 6 (until 1990); Tier I (until 2009); WTA Premier Mandatory and 5 (until 2021))	3	3	6
Singles	WTA 500 (Note: Formerly known as: Category 3 (until 1990); Tier II (until 2009); WTA Premier (until 2021))	5	2	7
Singles	WTA 250 (Note: Formerly known as: Category 1 & 2 (until 1990); Tier III & IV & V (until 2009); WTA International (until 2021))	4	1	5
Singles	Total	15	8	23
Doubles	Grand Slam	–	–	–
Doubles	Summer Olympics	–	–	–
Doubles	WTA Finals	–	–	–
Doubles	WTA Elite	–	–	–
Doubles	WTA 1000	–	–	–
Doubles	WTA 500	–	–	–
Doubles	WTA 250	0	1	1
Doubles	Total	0	1	1

This is a list of the main career statistics of Serbian professional tennis player, Ana Ivanovic. Ivanovic won fifteen career singles titles including one major title at the 2008 French Open and three WTA Tier I titles. She was also the runner-up at the 2007 French Open and 2008 Australian Open and a semifinalist at the 2007 Wimbledon Championships and 2007 WTA Tour Championships. On June 9, 2008, Ivanovic became world No. 1 for the first time in her career.

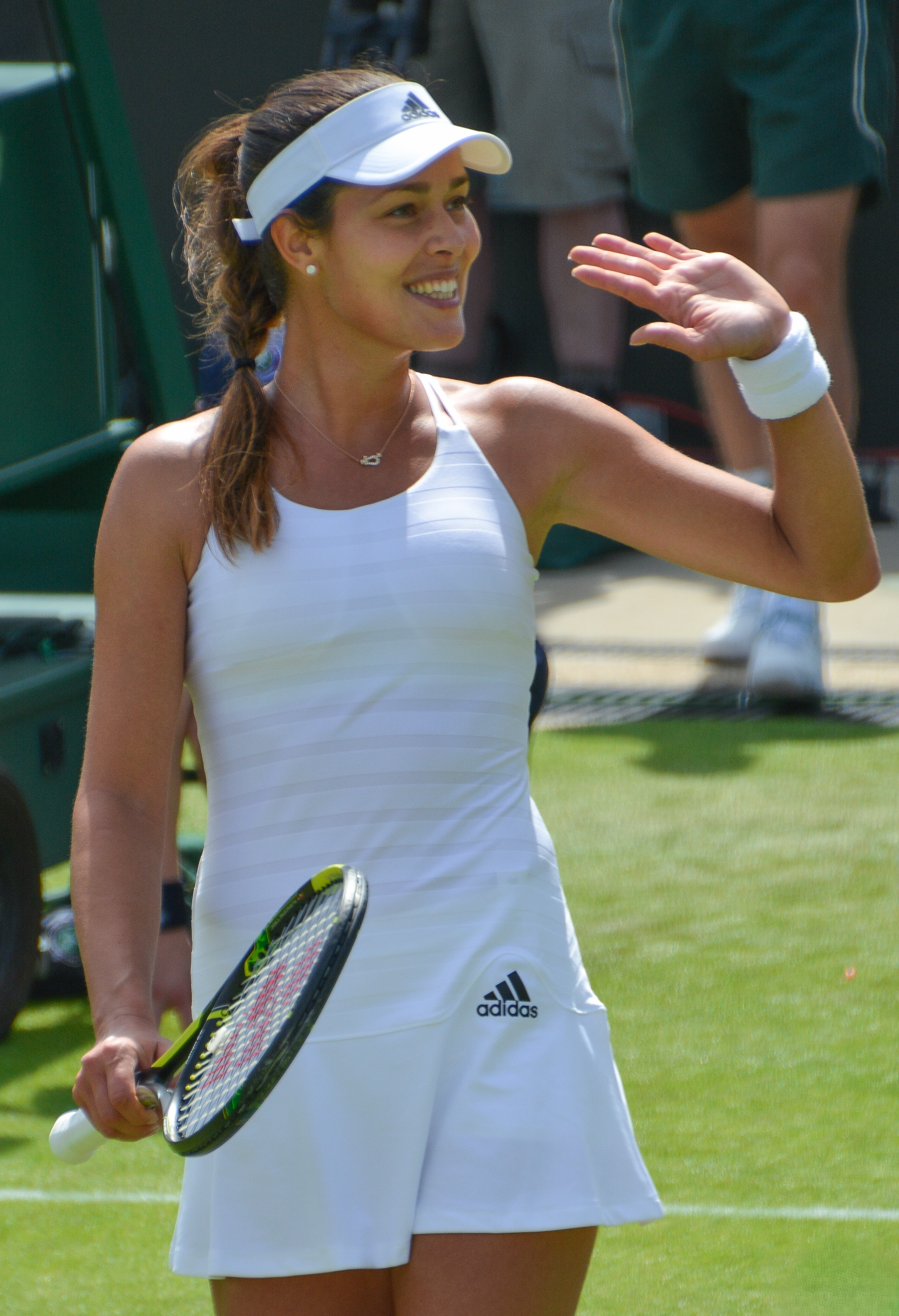
Ivanovic at Wimbledon

== Performance timelines ==
Key
W	F	SF	QF	#R	RR	Q#	DNQ	A	NH

(W) winner; (F) finalist; (SF) semifinalist; (QF) quarterfinalist; (#R) rounds 4, 3, 2, 1; (RR) round-robin stage; (Q#) qualification round; (DNQ) did not qualify; (A) absent; (NH) not held; (SR) strike rate (events won / competed); (W–L) win–loss record.

Only main-draw results in WTA Tour, Grand Slam tournaments, Billie Jean King Cup (Fed Cup), Hopman Cup and Olympic Games are included in win–loss records.

=== Singles ===
Tournament	2003	2004	2005	2006	2007	2008	2009	2010	2011	2012	2013	2014	2015	2016	SR	W–L	Win%
Grand Slam tournaments
Australian Open	A	A	3R	2R	3R	F	3R	2R	1R	4R	4R	QF	1R	3R	0 / 12	26–12	68%
French Open	A	A	QF	3R	F	W	4R	2R	1R	3R	4R	3R	SF	3R	1 / 12	37–11	77%
Wimbledon	A	A	3R	4R	SF	3R	4R	1R	3R	4R	2R	3R	2R	1R	0 / 12	24–12	67%
US Open	A	Q1	2R	3R	4R	2R	1R	4R	4R	QF	4R	2R	1R	1R	0 / 12	20–12	63%
Win–Loss	0–0	0–0	9–4	8–4	16–4	16–3	8–4	5–4	4–4	12–4	10–4	9–4	6–4	4–4	1 / 48	107–47	69%
National representation
Summer Olympics	NH	A	Not Held			A (Note: She was the Top Seed, but withdrew from the Olympic tennis tournament because of a thumb injury.)	Not Held			3R	Not Held			1R	0 / 2	2–2	50%
Year-end championships
WTA Finals	Did Not Qualify				SF	RR	Did Not Qualify					RR	DNQ		0 / 3	4–5	44%
WTA Elite Trophy	Not Held						DNQ	W	W	DNQ	SF	A		DNQ	2 / 3	8–2	80%
WTA 1000 + former^{†} tournaments
Dubai / Qatar Open (Note: The Dubai Tennis Championships and the Qatar Open have frequently switched their tournament status between Premier 5 and Premier events. Doha initially held Premier 5 Status, before the rights were given to Dubai between 2009 and 2010 due to the former's hosting of the WTA Championships in those years. Doha regained its Premier 5 status in 2012 due to its success in 2011, but its rights were once again given back to Dubai in 2015, with Doha having a Premier status currently.)	Not Tier I					3R (Note: Withdrew during the tournament. Not counted as a loss.)	QF	A	1R	2R	3R	2R	3R	A	0 / 7	8–6	57%
Indian Wells Open	A	A	A	QF	4R	W	F	2R	QF	SF	3R	3R	3R	3R	1 / 11	26–10	72%
Miami Open	A	A	QF	4R	2R	3R	3R	3R	4R	4R	4R	4R	3R	3R	0 / 12	19–12	61%
Berlin / Madrid Open (Note: In 2009, the Berlin Open was replaced by the Madrid Open. The Premier Mandatory tournaments were reclassified as WTA 1000 tournaments in 2021.)	A	A	1R	1R	W	SF	A	2R	1R	3R	SF	QF	3R	2R	1 / 11	21–10	68%
Italian Open	A	A	3R	A	A	2R	3R	SF	2R	3R	1R	SF	2R	2R	0 / 10	15–10	60%
Canadian Open	A	A	3R	W	2R	3R	2R	A	3R	2R	3R	2R	QF	A	1 / 10	16–8	67%
Cincinnati Open	NH	Not Tier I					2R	SF	2R	A	1R	F	QF	1R	0 / 7	12–7	63%
Pan Pacific / Wuhan Open (Note: The Pan Pacific Open was demoted to Premier status in 2014 and replaced by the Wuhan Open.)	A	A	A	2R	F	2R	1R	2R	3R	2R	3R	1R	3R	A	0 / 10	13–10	57%
China Open	NH	Not Tier I					A	QF	QF	3R	2R	SF	SF	A	0 / 6	16–6	73%
Charleston Open^{†}	A	A	A	A	3R	A	Not Tier I								0 / 1	1–1	50%
Southern California Open^{†}	A	A	A	3R	A	Not Held		Not Tier I				NH	NTI	NH	0 / 1	2–1	67%
Zürich Open^{†}	A	2R	SF	A	2R	NTI	Not Held								0 / 3	4–3	57%
Kremlin Cup^{†}	A	A	A	A	A	2R	Not Tier I								0 / 1	0–1	0%
Win–Loss	0–0	1–1	11–4	13–5	13–6	12–6	10–7	13–7	14–9	14–8	14–9	20–9	14–9	4–5	3 / 90	153–85	64%
Career statistics
	2003	2004	2005	2006	2007	2008	2009	2010	2011	2012	2013	2014	2015	2016	SR	W–L	Win%
Tournaments	0	4	15	19	20	18	14	20	20	19	22	22	19	16	Career total: 228		
Titles	0	0	1	1	3	3	0	2	1	0	0	4	0	0	Career total: 15		
Finals	0	0	1	1	5	4	1	2	1	0	1	6	1	0	Career total: 23		
Hard Win–Loss	0–0	3–2	21–8	28–14	29–13	30–12	16–10	27–14	26–14	25–14	31–18	38–12	21–13	8–10	12 / 160	303–154	66%
Clay Win–Loss	0–0	0–1	9–4	7–4	16–3	10–2	5–2	5–4	2–4	7–5	11–4	14–5	7–4	5–4	2 / 44	98–46	68%
Grass Win–Loss	0–0	0–1	2–1	5–2	6–2	2–1	3–2	1–2	6–3	5–2	1–2	7–1	1–2	2–2	1 / 24	41–23	64%
Overall Win–Loss	0–0	3–4	32–13	40–20	51–18	42–15	24–14	33–20	34–21	37–21	43–24	59–18	29–19	15–16	15 / 228	442–223	66%
Win %	–	43%	71%	67%	74%	74%	63%	62%	62%	64%	64%	77%	60%	48%	Career total: 66%		
Year-end ranking	705	97	16	14	4	5	22	17	22	13	16	5	16	65	$15,510,787		

=== Doubles ===
Tournament	2005	2006	2007	...	2011	SR	W–L
Australian Open	A	A	A		A	0 / 0	0–0
French Open	1R	A	1R		A	0 / 2	0–2
Wimbledon	3R	1R	1R		2R	0 / 4	3–4
US Open	A	3R	A		A	0 / 1	2–1
Win–Loss	2–2	2–2	0–2		1–1	0 / 7	5–7

== Significant finals ==
=== Grand Slam tournaments ===
==== Singles: 3 (1 title, 2 runner-ups) ====
Result	Year	Tournament	Surface	Opponent	Score
Loss	2007	French Open	Clay	(Belgium) Justine Henin	1–6, 2–6
Loss	2008	Australian Open	Hard	(Russia) Maria Sharapova	5–7, 3–6
Win	2008	French Open	Clay	(Russia) Dinara Safina	6–4, 6–3

== Other significant finals ==
=== WTA 1000 tournaments ===
==== Singles: 6 (3 titles, 3 runner-ups) ====
Result	Year	Tournament	Surface	Opponent	Score
Win	2006	Canadian Open	Hard	(Switzerland) Martina Hingis	6–2, 6–3
Loss	2007	Pan Pacific Open	Carpet (i)	(Switzerland) Martina Hingis	4–6, 2–6
Win	2007	German Open	Clay	(Russia) Svetlana Kuznetsova	3–6, 6–4, 7–6^{(7–4)}
Win	2008	Indian Wells Open	Hard	(Russia) Svetlana Kuznetsova	6–4, 6–3
Loss	2009	Indian Wells Open	Hard	(Russia) Vera Zvonareva	6–7^{(5–7)}, 2–6
Loss	2014	Cincinnati Open	Hard	(United States) Serena Williams	4–6, 1–6

=== WTA Elite Trophy ===
==== Singles: 2 (2 titles) ====
Result	Year	Tournament	Surface	Opponent	Score
Win	2010	WTA Tournament of Champions, Bali	Hard (i)	(Russia) Alisa Kleybanova	6–2, 7–6^{(7–5)}
Win	2011	WTA Tournament of Champions, Bali	Hard (i)	(Spain) Anabel Medina Garrigues	6–3, 6–0

== WTA Tour finals ==
=== Singles: 23 (15 titles, 8 runner-ups) ===
Legend Grand Slam (1–2) WTA Elite Trophy (2–0) Tier I / Premier 5 & Premier M (3–3) Tier II / Premier (5–2) Tier V / International (4–1)	Finals by surface Hard (12–5) Grass (1–0) Clay (2–2) Carpet (0–1)	Finals by setting Outdoor (10–5) Indoor (5–3)

Result	W–L	Date	Tournament	Tier	Surface	Opponent	Score
Win	1–0	Jan 2005	Canberra International, Australia	Tier V	Hard	(Hungary) Melinda Czink	7–5, 6–1
Win	2–0	Aug 2006	Canadian Open, Canada	Tier I	Hard	(Switzerland) Martina Hingis	6–2, 6–3
Loss	2–1	Feb 2007	Pan Pacific Open, Japan	Tier I	Carpet (i)	(Switzerland) Martina Hingis (2)	4–6, 2–6
Win	3–1	May 2007	Berlin Open, Germany	Tier I	Clay	(Russia) Svetlana Kuznetsova	3–6, 6–4, 7–6^{(7–4)}
Loss	3–2	Jun 2007	French Open, France	Grand Slam	Clay	(Belgium) Justine Henin	1–6, 2–6
Win	4–2	Aug 2007	LA Championships, United States	Tier II	Hard	(Russia) Nadia Petrova	7–5, 6–4
Win	5–2	Sep 2007	Luxembourg Open, Luxembourg	Tier II	Hard (i)	(Slovakia) Daniela Hantuchová	3–6, 6–4, 6–4
Loss	5–3	Jan 2008	Australian Open, Australia	Grand Slam	Hard	(Russia) Maria Sharapova	5–7, 3–6
Win	6–3	Mar 2008	Indian Wells Open, United States	Tier I	Hard	(Russia) Svetlana Kuznetsova (2)	6–4, 6–3
Win	7–3	Jun 2008	French Open, France	Grand Slam	Clay	(Russia) Dinara Safina	6–4, 6–3
Win	8–3	Oct 2008	Linz Open, Austria	Tier II	Hard (i)	(Russia) Vera Zvonareva	6–2, 6–1
Loss	8–4	Mar 2009	Indian Wells Open, United States	Premier M	Hard	(Russia) Vera Zvonareva (2)	6–7^{(5–7)}, 2–6
Win	9–4	Oct 2010	Linz Open, Austria (2)	International	Hard (i)	(Switzerland) Patty Schnyder	6–1, 6–2
Win	10–4	Nov 2010	WTA Tournament of Champions, Indonesia	Elite	Hard (i)	(Russia) Alisa Kleybanova	6–2, 7–6^{(7–5)}
Win	11–4	Nov 2011	WTA Tournament of Champions, Indonesia (2)	Elite	Hard (i)	(Spain) Anabel Medina	6–3, 6–0
Loss	11–5	Oct 2013	Linz Open, Austria	International	Hard (i)	(Germany) Angelique Kerber	4–6, 6–7^{(6–8)}
Win	12–5	Jan 2014	Auckland Open, New Zealand	International	Hard	(United States) Venus Williams	6–2, 5–7, 6–4
Win	13–5	Apr 2014	Monterrey Open, Mexico	International	Hard	(Serbia) Jovana Jakšić	6–2, 6–1
Loss	13–6	Apr 2014	Stuttgart Open, Germany	Premier	Clay (i)	(Russia) Maria Sharapova (2)	6–3, 4–6, 1–6
Win	14–6	Jun 2014	Birmingham Classic, United Kingdom	Premier	Grass	(Czech Republic) Barbora Strýcová	6–3, 6–2
Loss	14–7	Aug 2014	Cincinnati Open, United States	Premier 5	Hard	(United States) Serena Williams	4–6, 1–6
Win	15–7	Sep 2014	Pan Pacific Open, Japan	Premier	Hard	(Denmark) Caroline Wozniacki	6–2, 7–6^{(7–2)}
Loss	15–8	Jan 2015	Brisbane International, Australia	Premier	Hard	(Russia) Maria Sharapova (3)	7–6^{(7–4)}, 3–6, 3–6

=== Doubles: 1 (runner-up) ===
Legend Tier III (0–1)	Finals by surface Grass (0–1)

Result	Date	Tournament	Tier	Surface	Partner	Opponent	Score
Loss	Jun 2006	Rosmalen Open, Netherlands	Tier III	Grass	(Russia) Maria Kirilenko	(China) Yan Zi (China) Zheng Jie	6–3, 2–6, 2–6

== ITF Circuit finals ==
=== Singles: 6 (5 titles, 1 runner-up) ===
Legend $50,000 tournaments (4–0) $25,000 tournaments (0–0) $10,000 tournaments (1–1)	Finals by surface Hard (1–0) Clay (2–1) Carpet (2–0)

Result	W–L	Date	Tournament	Tier	Surface	Opponent	Score
Loss	0–1	Nov 2003	ITF Barcelona, Spain	10,000	Clay	(Spain) Marta Fraga	4–6, 7–5, 4–6
Win	1–1	Feb 2004	ITF Mallorca, Spain	10,000	Clay	(Serbia and Montenegro) Ana Timotić	6–1, 6–1
Win	2–1	May 2004	Kangaroo Cup Gifu, Japan	50,000	Carpet	(South Korea) Jeon Mi-ra	6–4, 2–6, 7–5
Win	3–1	May 2004	Fukuoka International, Japan	50,000	Carpet	(Slovakia) Jarmila Gajdošová	6–2, 6–7^{(4–7)}, 7–6^{(7–4)}
Win	4–1	Sep 2004	ITF Fano, Italy	50,000	Clay	(Romania) Delia Sescioreanu	6–2, 6–4
Win	5–1	Sep 2004	Batumi Ladies Open, Georgia	50,000	Hard	(Russia) Anna Chakvetadze	6–3, 6–3

== Junior Grand Slam tournament finals ==
=== Singles: 1 (runner-up) ===
Result	Year	Tournament	Surface	Opponent	Score
Loss	2004	Wimbledon	Grass	(Ukraine) Kateryna Bondarenko	4–6, 7–6^{(7–2)}, 2–6

== WTA Tour career earnings ==
Year	Grand Slam singles titles	WTA singles titles	Total singles titles	Earnings ($)	Money list rank
2005	0	1	1	472,547	29
2006	0	1	1	671,616	20
2007	0	3	3	1,960,354	4
2008	1	2	3	3,119,640	4
2009	0	0	0	914,725	16
2010	0	2	2	774,025	24
2011	0	1	1	746,925	28
2012	0	0	0	1,001,752	16
2013	0	0	0	1,055,383	24
2014	0	4	4	2,317,649	12
2015	0	0	0	1,898,722	13
2016	0	0	0	516,809	68
Career	1	14	15	15,510,787	27

== Billie Jean King Cup (Fed Cup) ==
=== Finals: 2 (2 runner-ups) ===
Result	Date	Team competition	Surface	Partner/team	Opponents	Score
Loss	Nov 2012	Fed Cup, Czech Republic	Hard (i)	(Serbia) Jelena Janković (Serbia) Bojana Jovanovski (Serbia) Aleksandra Krunić	(Czech Republic) Petra Kvitová (Czech Republic) Lucie Šafářová (Czech Republic) Lucie Hradecká (Czech Republic) Andrea Hlaváčková	1–3

=== Participations ===
==== Singles: 24 (17–7) ====
Edition	Round	Date	Venue	Against	Surface	Opponent	W/L	Result
2006	Z1 RR	Apr 2006	Plovdiv (BUL)	Slovenia	Clay	Maša Zec Peškirič	W (1)	6–2, 6–2
2006	Z1 RR	Apr 2006	Plovdiv (BUL)	South Africa	Clay	Alicia Pillay	W (2)	6–0, 6–1
2006	Z1 RR	Apr 2006	Plovdiv (BUL)	Denmark	Clay	Caroline Wozniacki	W (3)	6–3, 6–0
2006	Z1 PO	Apr 2006	Plovdiv (BUL)	Israel	Clay	Shahar Pe'er	L (1)	2–6, 6–4, 4–6
2008	Z1 RR	Feb 2008	Budapest (HUN)	Poland	Carpet (i)	Urszula Radwańska	W (4)	6–3, 6–1
2008	Z1 RR	Feb 2008	Budapest (HUN)	Romania	Carpet (i)	Monica Niculescu	W (5)	5–7, 6–4, 7–5
2008	Z1 PO	Feb 2008	Budapest (HUN)	Netherlands	Carpet (i)	Renée Reinhard	W (6)	6–2, 3–6, 6–3
2008	PO2	Apr 2008	Zagreb (CRO)	Croatia	Hard (i)	Nika Ožegović	W (7)	7–5, 6–1
2009	WG2	Feb 2009	Belgrade (SRB)	Japan	Hard (i)	Ai Sugiyama	W (8)	6–4, 6–4
2009	WG2	Feb 2009	Belgrade (SRB)	Japan	Hard (i)	Ayumi Morita	W (9)	6–1, 6–2
2009	PO	Apr 2009	Lleida (ESP)	Spain	Clay	Anabel Medina Garrigues	W (10)	3–6, 6–1, 6–2
2010	WG QF	Feb 2010	Belgrade (SRB)	Russia	Hard (i)	Svetlana Kuznetsova	L (2)	1–6, 4–6
2010	WG QF	Feb 2010	Belgrade (SRB)	Russia	Hard (i)	Alisa Kleybanova	L (3)	2–6, 3–6
2011	PO	Apr 2011	Bratislava (SVK)	Slovakia	Clay (i)	Daniela Hantuchová	W (11)	6–2, 6–4
2011	PO	Apr 2011	Bratislava (SVK)	Slovakia	Clay (i)	Dominika Cibulková	L (4)	4–6, 3–3 ret.
2012	WG SF	Apr 2012	Moscow (RUS)	Russia	Clay (i)	Svetlana Kuznetsova	L (5)	2–6, 6–2, 4–6
2012	WG SF	Apr 2012	Moscow (RUS)	Russia	Clay (i)	Anastasia Pavlyuchenkova	W (12)	3–6, 6–0, 6–3
2012	WG F	Nov 2012	Prague (CZE)	Czech Republic	Hard (i)	Lucie Šafářová	L (6)	4–6, 3–6
2012	WG F	Nov 2012	Prague (CZE)	Czech Republic	Hard (i)	Petra Kvitová	W (13)	6–3, 7–5
2013	WG QF	Apr 2013	Stuttgart (GER)	Germany	Clay (i)	Mona Barthel	W (14)	7–6^{(5)}, 2–6, 6–2
2013	WG QF	Apr 2013	Stuttgart (GER)	Germany	Clay (i)	Angelique Kerber	W (15)	7–5, 7–5
2014	PO2	Apr 2014	Bucharest (ROU)	Romania	Clay	Sorana Cîrstea	L (7)	6–3, 1–6, 2–6
2014	PO2	Apr 2014	Bucharest (ROU)	Romania	Clay	Simona Halep	W (16)	6–3, 7–6^{(2)}
2015	PO2	Apr 2015	Novi Sad (SRB)	Paraguay	Hard (i)	Montserrat Gonzalez	W (17)	6–2, 6–0

==== Doubles: 5 (3–2) ====
Edition	Round	Date	Venue	Partnering	Against	Surface	Opponents	W/L	Result
2006	Z1 RR	Apr 2006	Plovdiv (BUL)	Danica Krstajić	Slovenia	Clay	Maša Zec Peškirič; Tina Obrež	W (1)	6–4, 5–7, 8–6
2006	Z1 RR	Apr 2006	Plovdiv (BUL)	Danica Krstajić	Denmark	Clay	Karina-Ildor Jacobsgaard; Henne Jansen	W (2)	6–1, 6–3
2006	Z1 PO	Apr 2006	Plovdiv (BUL)	Danica Krstajić	Israel	Clay	Shahar Pe'er; Tzipora Obziler	L (1)	1–6, 6–4, 8–10
2008	Z1 RR	Feb 2008	Budapest (HUN)	Jelena Janković	Romania	Carpet (i)	Sorana Cîrstea; Monica Niculescu	W (3)	2–6, 7–6^{(3)}, 7–6^{(2)}
2010	WG QF	Feb 2010	Belgrade (SRB)	Jelena Janković	Russia	Hard (i)	Svetlana Kuznetsova; Alisa Kleybanova	L (2)	1–6, 4–6

== Hopman Cup ==
=== Finals ===
Result	Date	Team competition	Surface	Partner/team	Opponents	Score
Loss	Jan 2013	Hopman Cup, Australia	Hard	(Serbia) Novak Djokovic	(Spain) Anabel Medina Garrigues; (Spain) Fernando Verdasco	1–2

== Best Grand Slam results ==
2008 Australian Open (4th seed)
Round	Opponent	Rank	Score
1R	(Romania) Sorana Cîrstea	106	7–5, 6–3
2R	(Italy) Tathiana Garbin	40	6–0, 6–3
3R	(Slovenia) Katarina Srebotnik [28]	27	6–3, 6–4
4R	(Denmark) Caroline Wozniacki	64	6–1, 7–6^{(7–2)}
QF	(United States) Venus Williams [8]	8	7–6^{(7–3)}, 6–4
SF	(Slovakia) Daniela Hantuchová [9]	9	0–6, 6–3, 6–4
F	(Russia) Maria Sharapova [5]	5	5–7, 3–6

2008 French Open (2nd seed)
Round	Opponent	Rank	Score
1R	(Sweden) Sofia Arvidsson	52	6–2, 7–5
2R	(Czech Republic) Lucie Šafářová	41	6–1, 6–2
3R	(Denmark) Caroline Wozniacki [30]	34	6–4, 6–1
4R	(Czech Republic) Petra Cetkovská	77	6–0, 6–0
QF	(Switzerland) Patty Schnyder [10]	11	6–3, 6–2
SF	(Serbia) Jelena Janković [3]	3	6–4, 3–6, 6–4
W	(Russia) Dinara Safina [13]	14	6–4, 6–3

2007 Wimbledon (6th seed)
Round	Opponent	Rank	Score
1R	(Hungary) Melinda Czink	133	6–0, 7–6^{(7–3)}
2R	(United States) Meilen Tu	38	6–4, 6–3
3R	(France) Aravane Rezaï	60	6–3, 6–2
4R	(Russia) Nadia Petrova [11]	9	6–1, 2–6, 6–4
QF	(Czech Republic) Nicole Vaidišová [14]	10	4–6, 6–2, 7–5
SF	(United States) Venus Williams [23]	31	2–6, 4–6

2012 US Open (12th seed)
Round	Opponent	Rank	Score
1R	(Ukraine) Elina Svitolina [Q]	176	6–3, 6–2
2R	(Sweden) Sofia Arvidsson	51	6–2, 6–2
3R	(United States) Sloane Stephens	44	6–7^{(4–7)}, 6–4, 6–2
4R	(Bulgaria) Tsvetana Pironkova	55	6–0, 6–4
QF	(United States) Serena Williams [4]	4	1–6, 3–6

== Wins against top 10 players ==
Season	2005	2006	2007	2008	2009	2010	2011	2012	2013	2014	2015	2016	Total
Wins	3	2	14	7	0	3	2	3	2	10	1	1	48

No.	Player	Rk	Event	Surface	Rd	Score	Rk	Years	Ref
1.	(Russia) Svetlana Kuznetsova	7	Miami Open, United States	Hard	4R	6–3, 3–6, 7–5	52	2005	
2.	(Russia) Vera Zvonareva	10	J&S Cup, Poland	Clay	2R	6–2, 6–4	37	2005	
3.	(France) Amélie Mauresmo	3	French Open, France	Clay	3R	6–4, 3–6, 6–4	31	2005	
4.	(France) Amélie Mauresmo	3	Sydney International, Australia	Hard	2R	6–3, 7–5	21	2006	
5.	(Switzerland) Patty Schnyder	8	J&S Cup, Poland	Clay	2R	6–3, 6–2	20	2006	
6.	(Russia) Nadia Petrova	6	Sydney International, Australia	Hard	2R	6–2, 4–2, retired	14	2007	
7.	(Serbia) Jelena Janković	10	Pan Pacific Open, Japan	Carpet (i)	QF	3–6, 6–4, 6–2	16	2007	
8.	(Russia) Maria Sharapova	1	Pan Pacific Open, Japan	Carpet (i)	SF	6–1, 0–1, retired	16	2007	
9.	(Serbia) Jelena Janković	9	Amelia Island Championships, United States	Clay	QF	7–5, 6–3	17	2007	
10.	(Russia) Svetlana Kuznetsova	4	German Open, Germany	Clay	F	3–6, 6–4, 7–6^{(7–4)}	16	2007	
11.	(Russia) Svetlana Kuznetsova	3	French Open, France	Clay	QF	6–0, 3–6, 6–1	7	2007	
12.	(Russia) Maria Sharapova	2	French Open, France	Clay	SF	6–2, 6–1	7	2007	
13.	(Russia) Nadia Petrova	9	Wimbledon, United Kingdom	Grass	4R	6–1, 2–6, 6–4	6	2007	
14.	(Czech Republic) Nicole Vaidišová	10	Wimbledon, United Kingdom	Grass	QF	4–6, 6–2, 7–5	6	2007	
15.	(Serbia) Jelena Janković	3	LA Championships, United States	Hard	SF	4–6, 6–3, 7–5	5	2007	
16.	(Russia) Nadia Petrova	9	LA Championships, United States	Hard	F	7–5, 6–4	5	2007	
17.	(Slovakia) Daniela Hantuchová	10	Luxembourg Open, Luxembourg	Hard (i)	F	3–6, 6–4, 6–4	6	2007	
18.	(Russia) Svetlana Kuznetsova	2	WTA Tour Championships, Spain	Hard (i)	RR	6–1, 4–6, 7–5	4	2007	
19.	(Slovakia) Daniela Hantuchová	9	WTA Tour Championships, Spain	Hard (i)	RR	6–2, 7–6^{(11–9)}	4	2007	
20.	(United States) Venus Williams	8	Australian Open, Australia	Hard	QF	7–6^{(7–3)}, 6–4	3	2008	
21.	(Slovakia) Daniela Hantuchová	9	Australian Open, Australia	Hard	SF	0–6, 6–3, 6–4	3	2008	
22.	(Serbia) Jelena Janković	4	Indian Wells Open, United States	Hard	SF	7–6^{(7–3)}, 6–3	2	2008	
23.	(Russia) Svetlana Kuznetsova	3	Indian Wells Open, United States	Hard	F	6–4, 6–3	2	2008	
24.	(Serbia) Jelena Janković	3	French Open, France	Clay	SF	6–4, 3–6, 6–4	2	2008	
25.	(Poland) Agnieszka Radwańska	10	Linz Open, Austria	Hard (i)	SF	6–2, 3–6, 7–5	4	2008	
26.	(Russia) Vera Zvonareva	9	Linz Open, Austria	Hard (i)	F	6–2, 6–1	4	2008	
27.	(Belarus) Victoria Azarenka	10	Italian Open, Italy	Clay	2R	6–4, 6–4	58	2010	
28.	(Russia) Elena Dementieva	6	Italian Open, Italy	Clay	3R	6–1, 7–6^{(7–5)}	58	2010	
29.	(Russia) Elena Dementieva	6	China Open, China	Hard	3R	7–6^{(7–2)}, 7–6^{(7–4)}	36	2010	
30.	(Serbia) Jelena Janković	6	Indian Wells Open, United States	Hard	4R	6–4, 6–2	21	2011	
31.	(Russia) Vera Zvonareva	3	China Open, China	Hard	3R	6–2, 6–1	18	2011	
32.	(Denmark) Caroline Wozniacki	4	Indian Wells Open, United States	Hard	4R	6–3, 6–2	16	2012	
33.	(France) Marion Bartoli	7	Indian Wells Open, United States	Hard	QF	6–3, 6–4	16	2012	
34.	(Czech Republic) Petra Kvitová	8	Fed Cup, Prague, Czech Republic	Hard (i)	F	6–3, 7–5	12	2012	
35.	(Germany) Angelique Kerber	6	Fed Cup, Stuttgart, Germany	Clay (i)	RR	7–5, 7–5	17	2013	
36.	(Germany) Angelique Kerber	6	Madrid Open, Spain	Clay	3R	6–3, 6–1	16	2013	
37.	(United States) Serena Williams	1	Australian Open, Australia	Hard	4R	4–6, 6–3, 6–3	14	2014	
38.	(Germany) Angelique Kerber	8	Dubai Championships, United Arab Emirates	Hard	1R	3–6, 6–3, 7–6^{(8–6)}	12	2014	
39.	(Romania) Simona Halep	5	Fed Cup, Bucharest, Romania	Clay	RR	6–3, 7–6^{(7–2)}	12	2014	
40.	(Serbia) Jelena Janković	8	Stuttgart Open, Germany	Clay (i)	SF	6–3, 7–5	12	2014	
41.	(Russia) Maria Sharapova	7	Italian Open, Italy	Clay	3R	6–1, 6–4	13	2014	
42.	(Russia) Maria Sharapova	6	Cincinnati Open, United States	Hard	SF	6–2, 5–7, 7–5	11	2014	
43.	(Germany) Angelique Kerber	8	Pan Pacific Open, Japan	Hard	SF	7–5, 6–3	10	2014	
44.	(Denmark) Caroline Wozniacki	9	Pan Pacific Open, Japan	Hard	F	6–2, 7–6^{(7–2)}	10	2014	
45.	(Canada) Eugenie Bouchard	5	WTA Finals, Singapore	Hard (i)	RR	6–1, 6–3	7	2014	
46.	(Romania) Simona Halep	4	WTA Finals, Singapore	Hard (i)	RR	7–6^{(9–7)}, 3–6, 6–3	7	2014	
47.	(Russia) Ekaterina Makarova	9	French Open, France	Clay	4R	7–5, 3–6, 6–1	7	2015	
48.	(Romania) Simona Halep	3	Dubai Championships, United Arab Emirates	Hard	2R	7–6^{(7–2)}, 6–2	17	2016	

- Key: (Rk) first use, opponent rank; (Rd) round; (Rk) 2nd use, player rank; (Ref) reference; (F) final; (SF) semifinal; (QF) quarterfinal; (#R) rounds 4, 3, 2, 1; (RR) round-robin stage; (Q#) qualifying rounds or stages (3), 2, 1.

== Double bagel matches (6-0, 6-0) ==
Result	Year	W–L	Tournament	Tier	Surface	Opponent	Rank	Round
Win	2003		ITF Barcelona, Spain		Clay	(Italy) Elena Vianello	501	R32
Win	2004		ITF Mallorca 2, Spain		Clay	(Greece) Christina Zachariadou	406	R16
Win	2004		ITF Fukuoka, Japan		Carpet	(Japan) Saori Obata	43	R16
Win	2005		J&S Cup, Poland		Clay	(Slovakia) Martina Suchá	61	R32
Win	2008		French Open, France	Grand Slam	Clay	(Czech Republic) Petra Cetkovská	77	R16
Loss	2012		Rogers Cup, Canada	Premier 5	Hard	(Italy) Roberta Vinci	28	R32
Win	2013		Monterrey Open, Mexico	International	Hard	(Russia) Marta Sirotkina	116	R32

== Notable exhibitions ==
=== Team competitions ===
Result	Date	Tournament	Surface	Team	Partners	Opponent team	Opponent players	Score
Loss	Jan 2011	Rally for Relief 2, Melbourne, Australia	Hard	Team Gold	(Australia) Lleyton Hewitt (C); (Australia) Samantha Stosur; (Swap player): (Serbia) Novak Djokovic; (Belgium) Justine Henin; (Switzerland) Roger Federer; (Denmark) Caroline Wozniacki	Team Green	(Australia) Patrick Rafter (C) (Spain) Rafael Nadal (Swap player) (Belgium) Kim Clijsters (United States) Andy Roddick (United Kingdom) Andy Murray (Belarus) Victoria Azarenka; (Russia) Vera Zvonareva	43–44
