= 2007 Rogers Cup =

- Date: August 6–12 (men); August 13–20 (women)
- Edition: 118th (men) / 106th (women)
- Surface: Hard / outdoor
- Location: Montreal, Quebec, Canada
- Venue: Uniprix Stadium

Champions

Men's singles
- (Serbia) Novak Djokovic

Women's singles
- (Belgium) Justine Henin

Men's doubles
- (India) Mahesh Bhupathi / (Czech Republic) Pavel Vízner

Women's doubles
- (Slovenia) Katarina Srebotnik / (Japan) Ai Sugiyama
- Canadian Open

The 2007 Canada Masters (also known as the 2007 Rogers Masters and 2007 Rogers Cup for sponsorship reasons) was a tennis tournament played on outdoor hard courts. It was the 118th edition of the Canada Masters, and was part of the ATP Masters Series of the 2007 ATP Tour, and of the Tier I Series of the 2007 WTA Tour. The men's event took place at the Uniprix Stadium in Montreal, Quebec, Canada, from August 6 through August 12, 2007, and the women's event at the Rexall Centre in Toronto, Ontario, Canada, from August 13 through August 20, 2007.

The men's singles featured World No. 1, Australian Open and Wimbledon champion Roger Federer, French Open winner and Stuttgart titlist Rafael Nadal, and new ATP No. 3 and Miami Masters champion Novak Djokovic. Among other top players present were Roland-Garros semifinalist Nikolay Davydenko, Washington champion Andy Roddick, Fernando González, Tommy Robredo and Richard Gasquet.

On the women's side were present World No. 1 and French Open champion Justine Henin, Charleston, Rome and recent Birmingham winner Jelena Janković, and Indian Wells, Berlin, and Rome finalist Svetlana Kuznetsova. Other top seeds competing were Los Angeles titlist Ana Ivanovic, 's-Hertogenbosch winner Anna Chakvetadze, Nadia Petrova, Marion Bartoli and Elena Dementieva.

== Finals ==
=== Men's singles ===
(Serbia) Novak Djokovic defeated (Switzerland) Roger Federer 7–6^{(7–2)}, 2–6, 7–6^{(7–2)}

- It was Novak Djokovic's 4th title of the year, and his 6th overall. It was his 2nd Masters title of the year, and overall.

=== Women's singles ===
(Belgium) Justine Henin defeated (Serbia) Jelena Janković 7–6^{(7–3)}, 7–5

- It was Justine Henin's 7th title of the year, and her 36th overall. It was her 1st Tier I title of the year, her 9th overall, and her 2nd win at the event.

=== Men's doubles ===
(India) Mahesh Bhupathi / (Czech Republic) Pavel Vízner defeated (Australia) Paul Hanley / (Zimbabwe) Kevin Ullyett 6–4, 6–4

=== Women's doubles ===
(Slovenia) Katarina Srebotnik / (Japan) Ai Sugiyama defeated (Zimbabwe) Cara Black / (United States) Liezel Huber 6–4, 2–6, [10–5]
