= 2007 East West Bank Classic =

- Date: August 6–12
- Edition: 34th
- Category: Tier II Series
- Draw: 56S / 16D
- Prize money: $600,000
- Surface: Hard / outdoor
- Location: Carson, California, U.S.
- Venue: Home Depot Center

Champions

Singles
- (Serbia) Ana Ivanovic

Doubles
- (Czech Republic) Květa Peschke / (Australia) Rennae Stubbs
- WTA Los Angeles

The 2007 East West Bank Classic was a women's tennis tournament played on outdoor hard courts. It was the 34th edition of the East West Bank Classic, and was part of the Tier II Series of the 2007 WTA Tour. It took place at the Home Depot Center in Carson, California, near Los Angeles, United States, from August 6 through August 12, 2007.

The singles field featured WTA No. 2, Australian Open runner-up and recent San Diego titlist Maria Sharapova, Charleston and Rome champion Jelena Janković, and French Open finalist and Berlin winner Ana Ivanovic. Also present were Paris titlist Nadia Petrova, Indian Wells champion Daniela Hantuchová, Marion Bartoli, Martina Hingis and Dinara Safina.

Third-seeded and wild card entry Ana Ivanovic won the singles title, defeating Nadia Petrova in the final, and earned $88,260 first-prize money. En route, she saved two match points in the semifinal against compatriot Jelena Janković; the first set she lost in that match was the only one she lost in the entire championships.

== Finals ==
=== Singles ===
(Serbia) Ana Ivanovic defeated (Russia) Nadia Petrova 7–5, 6–4

- It was Ana Ivanovic's 2nd singles title of the year, and the 4th of her career.

=== Doubles ===
(Czech Republic) Květa Peschke / (Australia) Rennae Stubbs defeated (Australia) Alicia Molik / (Italy) Mara Santangelo 6–0, 6–1
