= 2007 German Open =

2007 German Open may refer to:

- 2007 German Open (tennis)
- 2007 German Open (badminton)
