= 1982 Avon Championships of Los Angeles =

- Date: March 1–7
- Edition: 9th
- Category: Virginia Slims circuit
- Draw: 32S / 16D
- Prize money: $150,000
- Surface: Carpet (Sporteze) / indoor
- Location: Los Angeles, California, U.S.
- Venue: The Forum

Champions

Singles
- (Socialist Federal Republic of Yugoslavia) Mima Jaušovec

Doubles
- (United States) Kathy Jordan / (United States) Anne Smith
← 1981 ·	Virginia Slims of Los Angeles	· 1983 →

The 1982 Avon Championships of Los Angeles was a women's tennis tournament played on indoor carpet courts at the Forum in Los Angeles, California in the United States that was part of the 1982 Avon Championships circuit. It was the ninth edition of the tournament and was held from March 1 through March 7, 1982. Fifth-seeded Mima Jaušovec won the singles title, and earned $30,000 first-prize money.

== Finals ==
=== Singles ===
(Socialist Federal Republic of Yugoslavia) Mima Jaušovec defeated (West Germany) Sylvia Hanika 6–2, 7–6^{(7–4)}

- It was Jaušovec's 1st singles title of the year and the 5th, and last, of her career.

=== Doubles ===
(United States) Kathy Jordan / (United States) Anne Smith defeated (United States) Barbara Potter / (United States) Sharon Walsh 6–3, 7–5

== Prize money ==
Event	W	F	SF	QF	Round of 16	Round of 32	Prel. round
Singles	$30,000	$15,000	$7,350	$3,600	$1,900	$1,100	$700
