= 1973 British Motor Cars of Los Angeles =

- Date: January 23–27
- Edition: 3rd
- Category: Virginia Slims circuit
- Draw: 16S / 8D
- Prize money: $25,000
- Surface: Carpet (Sportface) / indoor
- Location: Los Angeles, California, U.S.
- Venue: The Forum

Champions

Singles
- (Australia) Margaret Court

Doubles
- (United States) Rosemary Casals / (United States) Julie Heldman
← 1972 ·	Virginia Slims of Los Angeles	· 1977 →

The 1973 British Motor Cars of Los Angeles was a women's tennis tournament played on indoor carpet courts at The Forum in Los Angeles, California in the United States that was part of the 1973 Virginia Slims World Championship Series. The event had previously been held in Long Beach. It was the third edition of the tournament and was held from January 23 through January 27, 1973. The final was watched by 2,693 spectators who saw first-seeded Margaret Court win the singles title and earn $6,000 first-prize money.

== Finals ==
=== Singles ===
(Australia) Margaret Court defeated (United States) Nancy Gunter 7–5, 6–7^{(1–5)}, 7–5

=== Doubles ===
(United States) Rosemary Casals / (United States) Julie Heldman defeated (Australia) Margaret Court / (Australia) Lesley Hunt walkover

== Prize money ==
Event	W	F	3rd	4th	QF	Round of 16
Singles	$6,000	$3,000	$1,900	$1,600	$900	$400
