= 1977 Virginia Slims of Los Angeles =

- Date: February 14–20
- Edition: 4th
- Category: Virginia Slims circuit
- Draw: 34S / 15D
- Prize money: $100,000
- Surface: Carpet (Sporteze) / indoor
- Location: Los Angeles, California, U.S.
- Venue: Memorial Sports Arena

Champions

Singles
- (United States) Chris Evert

Doubles
- (United States) Rosemary Casals / (United States) Chris Evert
← 1973 ·	Virginia Slims of Los Angeles	· 1978 →

The 1977 Virginia Slims of Los Angeles was a women's tennis tournament played on indoor carpet courts at the Memorial Sports Arena in Los Angeles, California in the United States that was part of the 1977 Virginia Slims World Championship Series. It was the fourth edition of the tournament and was held from February 14 through February 20, 1977. First-seeded Chris Evert won the singles title and earned $20,000 first-prize money.

== Finals ==
=== Singles ===
(United States) Chris Evert defeated (United States) Martina Navratilova 6–2, 2–6, 6–1

- It was Evert's 4th singles title of the year and the 71st of her career.

=== Doubles ===
(United States) Rosemary Casals / (United States) Chris Evert defeated (United States) Martina Navratilova / (Netherlands) Betty Stöve 6–2, 6–4

== Prize money ==
Event	W	F	3rd	4th	QF	Round of 16	Round of 32	Prel. round
Singles	$20,000	$10,000	$5,800	$5,000	$2,500	$1,375	$775	$400

== See also ==
- Evert–Navratilova rivalry
