= 1981 Avon Championships of Los Angeles =

- Date: March 2–8
- Edition: 8th
- Category: Virginia Slims circuit
- Draw: 32S / 16D
- Prize money: $150,000
- Surface: Carpet (Sporteze) / indoor
- Location: Los Angeles, California, U.S.
- Venue: The Forum

Champions

Singles
- (United States) Martina Navratilova

Doubles
- (United Kingdom) Sue Barker / (United States) Ann Kiyomura
← 1980 ·	Virginia Slims of Los Angeles	· 1982 →

The 1981 Avon Championships of Los Angeles was a women's tennis tournament played on indoor carpet courts at the Forum in Los Angeles, California in the United States that was part of the 1981 Avon Championships circuit. It was the eighth edition of the tournament and was held from March 2 through March 8, 1981. Second-seeded Martina Navratilova won the singles title, her second consecutive and third in total at the event, and earned $30,000 first-prize money.

== Finals ==
=== Singles ===
(United States) Martina Navratilova defeated (United States) Andrea Jaeger 6–4, 6–0

- It was Navratilova's 3rd singles title of the year and the 48th of her career.

=== Doubles ===
(United Kingdom) Sue Barker / (United States) Ann Kiyomura defeated (United States) Marita Redondo / (United States) Peanut Louie 6–1, 4–6, 6–1

== Prize money ==
Event	W	F	SF	QF	Round of 16	Round of 32	Prel. round
Singles	$30,000	$15,000	$7,350	$3,600	$1,900	$1,100	$700
