= 2007 Qatar Telecom German Open – Doubles =

Doubles
- 2007 Qatar Telecom German Open

Final
- Champion: (United States) Lisa Raymond (Australia) Samantha Stosur
- Runner-up: (Italy) Tathiana Garbin (Italy) Roberta Vinci
- Score: 6–3, 6–4

Details
- Draw: 28
- Seeds: 8

Events
| Singles | Doubles |
| ← 2006 · | WTA German Open | · 2008 → |

Yan Zi and Zheng Jie were the defending champions, but retired due to Zheng's left ankle injury in the second round.

== Seeds ==
1. (United States) Lisa Raymond / (Australia) Samantha Stosur (champions)
2. (Zimbabwe) Cara Black / (South Africa) Liezel Huber (semifinals)
3. (China) Yan Zi / (China) Zheng Jie (second round; retired due to Zheng's left ankle injury)
4. (Czech Republic) Květa Peschke / (Australia) Rennae Stubbs (semifinals)
5. (Slovenia) Katarina Srebotnik / (Japan) Ai Sugiyama (quarterfinals)
6. (Spain) Anabel Medina Garrigues / (Spain) Virginia Ruano Pascual (first round)
7. (Germany) Anna-Lena Grönefeld / (Italy) Mara Santangelo (second round)
8. (Israel) Shahar Pe'er / (Russia) Dinara Safina (second round; retired due to Safina's cold)

* The top four seeds received a bye in the first round.

== Draw ==
=== Key ===
- Q = Qualifier
- WC = Wild card
- LL = Lucky loser
- Alt = Alternate
- SE = Special exempt
- PR = Protected ranking
- ITF = ITF entry
- JE = Junior exempt
- w/o = Walkover
- r = Retired
- d = Defaulted
- SR = Special ranking

=== Final ===
Semifinals
1 | (United States) Lisa Raymond (Australia) Samantha Stosur | 6 | 6
4 | (Czech Republic) Květa Peschke (Australia) Rennae Stubbs | 2 | 2
(Italy) Tathiana Garbin (Italy) Roberta Vinci | 3 | 6 | [10]
2 | (Zimbabwe) Cara Black (South Africa) Liezel Huber | 6 | 3 | [5]

Final
1 | (United States) Lisa Raymond (Australia) Samantha Stosur | 6 | 6
(Italy) Tathiana Garbin (Italy) Roberta Vinci | 3 | 4

=== Earlier rounds ===
==== Top half ====
First round
(Russia) E Likhovtseva (Russia) E Vesnina | 6 | 6^{2} | [8]
(Ukraine) A Bondarenko (Ukraine) K Bondarenko | 3 | 7^{7} | [10]
(Slovakia) J Husárová (United States) M Shaughnessy | 6 | 6
(Serbia) Ivanovic (Russia) M Kirilenko | 4 | 3
(Ukraine) Y Fedak (Czech Republic) V Uhlířová | 7 | 4 | [9]
7 | (Germany) A-L Grönefeld (Italy) M Santangelo | 5 | 6 | [11]
(Greece) E Daniilidou (Germany) J Wöhr | 4 | 4
(Serbia) J Janković (China) N Li | 6 | 6
(Russia) S Kuznetsova (Russia) N Petrova | 6 | 6
(Germany) M Müller (Czech Republic) G Navrátilová | 1 | 2
(China) S Peng (Czech Republic) H Šromová | 3 | 6^{3}
8 | (Israel) S Pe'er (Russia) D Safina | 6 | 7^{7}

Second round
1 | (United States) L Raymond (Australia) S Stosur | w/o
(Ukraine) A Bondarenko (Ukraine) K Bondarenko
(Slovakia) J Husárová (United States) M Shaughnessy | 6 | 1 | [10]
7 | (Germany) A-L Grönefeld (Italy) M Santangelo | 4 | 6 | [7]
4 | (Czech Republic) K Peschke (Australia) R Stubbs | w/o
(Serbia) J Janković (China) N Li
(Russia) S Kuznetsova (Russia) N Petrova | w/o
8 | (Israel) S Pe'er (Russia) D Safina

Quarterfinals
1 | (United States) L Raymond (Australia) S Stosur | 6 | 3 | [10]
(Slovakia) J Husárová (United States) M Shaughnessy | 2 | 6 | [6]
4 | (Czech Republic) K Peschke (Australia) R Stubbs | w/o
(Russia) S Kuznetsova (Russia) N Petrova

Semifinals
1 | (United States) L Raymond (Australia) S Stosur | 6 | 6
4 | (Czech Republic) K Peschke (Australia) R Stubbs | 2 | 2

==== Bottom half ====
First round
6 | (Spain) A Medina Garrigues (Spain) V Ruano Pascual | 6 | 4 | [6]
(France) É Loit (Australia) B Stewart | 4 | 6 | [10]
(Italy) T Garbin (Italy) R Vinci | 6 | 2 | [11]
(Poland) K Jans (Poland) A Rosolska | 3 | 6 | [9]
(United States) L Granville (Croatia) J Kostanić Tošić | 6^{1} | 6 | [10]
WC | (Germany) J Görges (Germany) V Henke | 7^{7} | 4 | [8]
5 | (Slovenia) K Srebotnik (Japan) A Sugiyama | 6 | 6
(Germany) K Barrois (Czech Republic) E Birnerová | 4 | 4
(Russia) V Dushevina (Russia) G Voskoboeva | 5 | 6^{3}
(Spain) L Domínguez Lino (Italy) F Pennetta | 7 | 7^{7}
WC | (Germany) T Malek (Germany) A Petkovic | 2 | 4
(France) S Brémond (United States) M Tu | 6 | 6

Second round
(France) É Loit (Australia) B Stewart | 6 | 3
(Italy) T Garbin (Italy) R Vinci | 7 | 6
(United States) L Granville (Croatia) J Kostanić Tošić | w/o
3 | (China) Z Yan (China) J Zheng
5 | (Slovenia) K Srebotnik (Japan) A Sugiyama | 6 | 6
(Spain) L Domínguez Lino (Italy) F Pennetta | 0 | 0
(France) S Brémond (United States) M Tu | 4 | 1
2 | (Zimbabwe) C Black (South Africa) L Huber | 6 | 6

Quarterfinals
(Italy) T Garbin (Italy) R Vinci | 6 | 6
(United States) L Granville (Croatia) J Kostanić Tošić | 3 | 3
5 | (Slovenia) K Srebotnik (Japan) A Sugiyama | 6 | 4 | [7]
2 | (Zimbabwe) C Black (South Africa) L Huber | 0 | 6 | [10]

Semifinals
(Italy) T Garbin (Italy) R Vinci | 3 | 6 | [10]
2 | (Zimbabwe) C Black (South Africa) L Huber | 6 | 3 | [5]
