= 1979 Avon Championships of Los Angeles =

- Date: February 12–18
- Edition: 6th
- Category: Virginia Slims circuit
- Draw: 32S / 16D
- Prize money: $150,000
- Surface: Carpet (Sporteze) / indoor
- Location: Los Angeles, California, United States
- Venue: The Forum

Champions

Singles
- (United States) Chris Evert

Doubles
- (United States) Rosie Casals / (United States) Chris Evert
← 1978 ·	Virginia Slims of Los Angeles	· 1980 →

The 1979 Avon Championships of Los Angeles was a women's tennis tournament.

It was played on indoor carpet courts at The Forum in Los Angeles, California in the United States.

It formed part of the 1979 Avon Championships circuit. It was the sixth edition of the tournament and was held from February 12 through to February 18, 1979.

Second-seeded Chris Evert won the singles title and earned $30,000 first-prize money.

== Finals ==
=== Singles ===
(United States) Chris Evert defeated (United States) Martina Navratilova 6–3, 6–4

- It was Evert's 2nd singles title of the year and the 87th of her career.

=== Doubles ===
(United States) Rosie Casals / (United States) Chris Evert defeated (United States) Martina Navratilova / (United States) Anne Smith 6–4, 1–6, 6–3

== Prize money ==
Event	W	F	3rd	4th	QF	Round of 16	Round of 32
Singles	$30,000	$15,000	$7,500	$7,200	$3,500	$1,750	$1,000

== See also ==
- Evert–Navratilova rivalry
