= 1978 Virginia Slims of Los Angeles =

- Date: January 23–29
- Edition: 5th
- Category: Virginia Slims circuit
- Draw: 32S / 16D
- Prize money: $100,000
- Surface: Carpet (Sporteze) / indoor
- Location: Los Angeles, California, U.S.
- Venue: Memorial Sports Arena

Champions

Singles
- (United States) Martina Navratilova

Doubles
- (Netherlands) Betty Stöve / (United Kingdom) Virginia Wade
← 1977 ·	Virginia Slims of Los Angeles	· 1979 →

The 1978 Virginia Slims of Los Angeles was a women's tennis tournament played on indoor carpet courts at the Memorial Sports Arena in Los Angeles, California in the United States that was part of the 1978 Virginia Slims World Championship Series. It was the fifth edition of the tournament and was held from January 23 through January 29, 1978. Second-seeded Martina Navratilova won the singles title and earned $20,000 first-prize money.

== Finals ==
=== Singles ===
(United States) Martina Navratilova defeated (United States) Rosie Casals 6–3, 6–2

=== Doubles ===
(Netherlands) Betty Stöve / (United Kingdom) Virginia Wade defeated (United States) Pam Teeguarden / (South Africa) Greer Stevens 6–3, 6–2

== Prize money ==
Event	W	F	3rd	4th	QF	Round of 16	Round of 32
Singles	$20,000	$10,500	$6,300	$5,500	$2,800	$1,550	$850
