= 1980 Avon Championships of Los Angeles =

- Date: February 4–10
- Edition: 7th
- Category: Virginia Slims circuit
- Draw: 32S / 16D
- Prize money: $125,000
- Surface: Carpet (Sporteze) / indoor
- Location: Los Angeles, California, U.S.
- Venue: The Forum

Champions

Singles
- (United States) Martina Navratilova

Doubles
- (United States) Rosie Casals / (United States) Martina Navratilova
← 1979 ·	Virginia Slims of Los Angeles	· 1981 →

The 1980 Avon Championships of Los Angeles was a women's tennis tournament played on indoor carpet courts at the Forum in Los Angeles, California in the United States that was part of the 1980 Avon Championships circuit. It was the seventh edition of the tournament and was held from February 4 through February 10, 1980. First-seeded Martina Navratilova won the singles title and earned $24,000 first-prize money.

== Finals ==
=== Singles ===
(United States) Martina Navratilova defeated (United States) Tracy Austin 6–2, 6–0

- It was Navratilova's 4th singles title of the year and the 38th of her career.

=== Doubles ===
(United States) Rosie Casals / (United States) Martina Navratilova defeated (United States) Kathy Jordan / (United States) Anne Smith 7–6, 6–2

== Prize money ==
Event	W	F	SF	QF	Round of 16	Round of 32
Singles	$24,000	$12,000	$6,000	$3,000	$1,600	$900
