= 2007 East West Bank Classic – Doubles =

Doubles
- 2007 East West Bank Classic

Final
- Champions: (Czech Republic) Květa Peschke (Australia) Rennae Stubbs
- Runners-up: (Australia) Alicia Molik (Italy) Mara Santangelo
- Score: 6–0, 6–1

Details
- Draw: 16
- Seeds: 4

Events
Singles	Doubles
← 2006 ·	WTA Los Angeles	· 2008 →

Virginia Ruano Pascual and Paola Suárez were the defending champions, but chose not to participate that year.

Květa Peschke and Rennae Stubbs won in the final 6–0, 6–1, against Alicia Molik and Mara Santangelo.

== Seeds ==
1. (Australia) Alicia Molik / (Italy) Mara Santangelo (final)
2. (Czech Republic) Květa Peschke / (Australia) Rennae Stubbs (champions)
3. (United States) Vania King / (China) Sun Tiantian (first round)
4. (Argentina) Gisela Dulko / (Russia) Maria Kirilenko (semifinals)

== Draw ==
=== Key ===
- Q = Qualifier
- WC = Wild card
- LL = Lucky loser
- Alt = Alternate
- SE = Special exempt
- PR = Protected ranking
- ITF = ITF entry
- JE = Junior exempt
- w/o = Walkover
- r = Retired
- d = Defaulted
- SR = Special ranking

First round
1	(Australia) A Molik (Italy) M Santangelo	0	6	[10]
(United States) C Morariu (United States) M Shaughnessy	6	2	[7]
(United States) J Craybas (United States) L Granville	6	6
(Ukraine) A Bondarenko (Ukraine) K Bondarenko	3	3
3	(United States) V King (China) T Sun	5	4
(Belarus) T Poutchek (Russia) A Rodionova	7	6
(China) S Peng (China) Z Yan	3	3
(Slovakia) D Hantuchová (Switzerland) M Hingis	6	6
(Greece) E Daniilidou (Germany) J Wöhr	2	7	[7]
WC	(United States) C Fusano (United States) R Kops-Jones	6	5	[10]
LL	(China) C Ji (China) S Sun	2	2
4	(Argentina) G Dulko (Russia) M Kirilenko	6	6
(Slovakia) J Husárová (Netherlands) M Krajicek	3	6	[9]
(United States) B Mattek (India) S Mirza	6	2	[11]
(Serbia) J Janković (Russia) N Petrova	4	4
2	(Czech Republic) K Peschke (Australia) R Stubbs	6	6

Quarterfinals
1	(Australia) A Molik (Italy) M Santangelo	6	7
(United States) J Craybas (United States) L Granville	1	5
(Belarus) T Poutchek (Russia) A Rodionova	w/o
(Slovakia) D Hantuchová (Switzerland) M Hingis
WC	(United States) C Fusano (United States) R Kops-Jones	4	0
4	(Argentina) G Dulko (Russia) M Kirilenko	6	6
(United States) B Mattek (India) S Mirza	6^{2}	4
2	(Czech Republic) K Peschke (Australia) R Stubbs	7	6

Semifinals
1	(Australia) A Molik (Italy) M Santangelo	6	6
(Belarus) T Poutchek (Russia) A Rodionova	3	2
4	(Argentina) G Dulko (Russia) M Kirilenko	4	1
2	(Czech Republic) K Peschke (Australia) R Stubbs	6	6

Final
1	(Australia) A Molik (Italy) M Santangelo	0	1
2	(Czech Republic) K Peschke (Australia) R Stubbs	6	6
