= 2007 Rogers Masters – Singles =

Singles
- 2007 Rogers Masters

Final
- Champion: (Serbia) Novak Djokovic
- Runner-up: (Switzerland) Roger Federer
- Score: 7–6^{(7–2)}, 2–6, 7–6^{(7–2)}

Details
- Draw: 56 (7Q / 4WC)
- Seeds: 16

Events
Singles	Doubles
- Rogers Masters

Novak Djokovic defeated the defending champion Roger Federer in the final, 7–6^{(7–2)}, 2–6, 7–6^{(7–2)} to win the men's singles tennis title at the 2007 Canadian Open. Djokovic became the first man to beat the world's top three players in one event since Boris Becker in 1994, having also defeated Rafael Nadal and Andy Roddick en route to the final.

== Seeds ==
The top eight seeds receive a bye into the second round.

1. (Switzerland) Roger Federer (final)
2. (Spain) Rafael Nadal (semifinals)
3. (Serbia) Novak Djokovic (champion)
4. (Russia) Nikolay Davydenko (quarterfinals)
5. (United States) Andy Roddick (quarterfinals)
6. (Chile) Fernando González (second round)
7. (Spain) Tommy Robredo (second round)
8. (France) Richard Gasquet (second round)
9. (United States) James Blake (second round, withdrew due to an abdominal muscle injury)
10. (Czech Republic) Tomáš Berdych (first round)
11. (Croatia) Ivan Ljubičić (first round)
12. (Germany) Tommy Haas (third round)
13. (United Kingdom) Andy Murray (second round)
14. (Russia) Mikhail Youzhny (third round)
15. (Argentina) Guillermo Cañas (first round)
16. (Spain) David Ferrer (second round)

== Draw ==
Key

- Q = Qualifier
- WC = Wild card
- LL = Lucky loser
- Alt = Alternate
- ITF = ITF entry
- PR = Protected ranking
- SR = Special ranking
- SE = Special exempt
- JE = Junior exempt
- JR = Junior Accelerator Programme entrant
- CO = College Accelerator Programme entrant
- NG = Next Gen Accelerator Program entrant
- w/o = Walkover
- r = Retired
- d = Defaulted

=== Finals ===
Quarterfinals
1	(Switzerland) Roger Federer	6	6
(Australia) Lleyton Hewitt	3	4
4	(Russia) Nikolay Davydenko	4	5
(Czech Republic) Radek Štěpánek	6	7
5	(United States) Andy Roddick	6^{4}	4
3	(Serbia) Novak Djokovic	7^{7}	6
WC	(Canada) Frank Dancevic	6	2	3
2	(Spain) Rafael Nadal	4	6	6

Semifinals
1	(Switzerland) Roger Federer	7^{8}	6
(Czech Republic) Radek Štěpánek	6^{6}	2
3	(Serbia) Novak Djokovic	7	6
2	(Spain) Rafael Nadal	5	3

Final
1	(Switzerland) Roger Federer	6^{2}	6	6^{2}
3	(Serbia) Novak Djokovic	7^{7}	2	7^{7}

=== Top half ===
==== Section 1 ====
First round
(Croatia) I Karlović	4	6	7^{7}
(Belarus) M Mirnyi	6	3	6^{3}
WC	(Canada) P Polansky	3	6^{7}
Q	(Italy) F Fognini	6	7^{9}
(United States) R Ginepri	4	4
13	(United Kingdom) A Murray	6	6
9	(United States) J Blake	7	7^{7}
(Austria) J Melzer	5	6^{4}
(Australia) L Hewitt	7^{7}	6
(Spain) JC Ferrero	6^{5}	4
(Slovakia) D Hrbatý	7^{8}	6
(Germany) P Kohlschreiber	6^{6}	4

Second round
1	(Switzerland) R Federer	7^{7}	7^{7}
(Croatia) I Karlović	6^{2}	6^{3}
Q	(Italy) F Fognini	6	6
13	(United Kingdom) A Murray	2	2
9	(United States) J Blake
(Australia) L Hewitt	w/o
(Slovakia) D Hrbatý	6	6
7	(Spain) T Robredo	2	4

Third round
1	(Switzerland) R Federer	6	6
Q	(Italy) F Fognini	1	1
(Australia) L Hewitt	6^{10}	7^{8}	7
(Slovakia) D Hrbatý	7^{12}	6^{6}	5

Quarterfinals
1	(Switzerland) R Federer	6	6
(Australia) L Hewitt	3	4

==== Section 2 ====
First round
(France) J Benneteau	3	4
(Finland) J Nieminen	6	6
(South Korea) H-t Lee	3	6	1
(Switzerland) S Wawrinka	6	3	6
Q	(France) S Grosjean	2	4
14	(Russia) M Youzhny	6	6
12	(Germany) T Haas	6	7^{8}
(Argentina) A Calleri	3	6^{6}
(Spain) N Almagro	6	6^{3}	3
(United States) M Russell	2	7^{7}	6
(Czech Republic) R Štěpánek	6	6
(Sweden) J Björkman	4	1

Second round
4	(Russia) N Davydenko	6	7^{7}
(Finland) J Nieminen	3	6^{5}
(Switzerland) S Wawrinka	4	4
14	(Russia) M Youzhny	6	6
12	(Germany) T Haas	6	3
(United States) M Russell	3	0^{r}
(Czech Republic) R Štěpánek	6^{2}	7^{7}	6
6	(Chile) F González	7^{7}	6^{1}	4

Third round
4	(Russia) N Davydenko	7^{10}	6
14	(Russia) M Youzhny	6^{8}	3
12	(Germany) T Haas	3	6	2
(Czech Republic) R Štěpánek	6	2	6

Quarterfinals
4	(Russia) N Davydenko	4	5
(Czech Republic) R Štěpánek	6	7

=== Bottom half ===
==== Section 3 ====
First round
(France) A Clément	7^{7}	6
WC	(Canada) P Bester	6^{2}	2
(Cyprus) M Baghdatis	7^{9}	6
(Spain) C Moyá	6^{7}	1
Q	(Netherlands) R Haase	6	7
10	(Czech Republic) T Berdych	4	5
16	(Spain) D Ferrer	6	6
Q	(Latvia) E Gulbis	2	1
(Argentina) D Nalbandian	6	6
Q	(Colombia) A Falla	4	3
(Russia) D Tursunov	6	4	3
(Germany) N Kiefer	1	6	6

Second round
5	(United States) A Roddick	6	7^{7}
(France) A Clément	1	6^{5}
(Cyprus) M Baghdatis	6	3	6
Q	(Netherlands) R Haase	2	6	1
16	(Spain) D Ferrer	6^{4}	1
(Argentina) D Nalbandian	7^{7}	6
(Germany) N Kiefer	3	3
3	(Serbia) N Djokovic	6	6

Third round
5	(United States) A Roddick	6	6
(Cyprus) M Baghdatis	2	3
(Argentina) D Nalbandian	2	3
3	(Serbia) N Djokovic	6	6

Quarterfinals
5	(United States) A Roddick	6^{5}	4
3	(Serbia) N Djokovic	7^{7}	6

==== Section 4 ====
First round
(Spain) F Verdasco	3	6	6
(Argentina) JI Chela	6	3	1
(Argentina) JM del Potro	4	6	3
WC	(Canada) F Dancevic	6	4	6
Q	(United States) W Odesnik	6	4	7^{7}
11	(Croatia) I Ljubičić	3	6	6^{5}
15	(Argentina) G Cañas	6	5	0
(France) P-H Mathieu	4	7	6
WC	(Canada) F Niemeyer	4	2
(Croatia) M Ančić	6	6
(Russia) M Safin	1
(Sweden) R Söderling	2^{r}

Second round
8	(France) R Gasquet	6	6^{7}	4
(Spain) F Verdasco	3	7^{9}	6
WC	(Canada) F Dancevic	6	4	7
Q	(United States) W Odesnik	3	6	5
(France) P-H Mathieu	6	6
(Croatia) M Ančić	3	2
(Russia) M Safin	6^{4}	0
2	(Spain) R Nadal	7^{7}	6

Third round
(Spain) F Verdasco	6	4	3
WC	(Canada) F Dancevic	4	6	6
(France) P-H Mathieu	6	3	2
2	(Spain) R Nadal	3	6	6

Quarterfinals
WC	(Canada) F Dancevic	6	2	3
2	(Spain) R Nadal	4	6	6
