= 2007 Rogers Masters – Doubles =

Doubles
- 2007 Rogers Masters

Final
- Champions: (India) Mahesh Bhupathi (Czech Republic) Pavel Vízner
- Runners-up: (Australia) Paul Hanley (Zimbabwe) Kevin Ullyett
- Score: 6–4, 6–4

Details
- Draw: 24
- Seeds: 8

Events
Singles	Doubles
- Rogers Masters

Bob Bryan and Mike Bryan were the defending champions, but lost in the semifinals to Mahesh Bhupathi and Pavel Vízner.

Mahesh Bhupathi and Pavel Vízner won in the final 6–4, 6–4 against Paul Hanley and Kevin Ullyett.

== Seeds ==
All seeds receive a bye into the second round.

1. (United States) Bob Bryan / (United States) Mike Bryan (semifinals)
2. (Sweden) Jonas Björkman / (Belarus) Max Mirnyi (quarterfinals)
3. (The Bahamas) Mark Knowles / (Canada) Daniel Nestor (quarterfinals)
4. (Czech Republic) Martin Damm / (India) Leander Paes (quarterfinals)
5. (Australia) Paul Hanley / (Zimbabwe) Kevin Ullyett (final)
6. (Israel) Jonathan Erlich / (Israel) Andy Ram (semifinals)
7. (Sweden) Simon Aspelin / (Australia) Julian Knowle (second round)
8. (India) Mahesh Bhupathi / (Czech Republic) Pavel Vízner (champions)

== Draw ==
Key

- Q = Qualifier
- WC = Wild card
- LL = Lucky loser
- Alt = Alternate
- ITF = ITF entry
- PR = Protected ranking
- SR = Special ranking
- SE = Special exempt
- JE = Junior exempt
- JR = Junior Accelerator Programme entrant
- CO = College Accelerator Programme entrant
- NG = Next Gen Accelerator Program entrant
- w/o = Walkover
- r = Retired
- d = Defaulted

=== Finals ===
Semifinals
1	(United States) Bob Bryan (United States) Mike Bryan	2	6	[10]
8	(India) Mahesh Bhupathi (Czech Republic) Pavel Vízner	6	4	[12]
5	(Australia) Paul Hanley (Zimbabwe) Kevin Ullyett	6	6
6	(Israel) Jonathan Erlich (Israel) Andy Ram	2	3

Final
8	(India) Mahesh Bhupathi (Czech Republic) Pavel Vízner	6	6
5	(Australia) Paul Hanley (Zimbabwe) Kevin Ullyett	4	4

=== Top half ===
First round
(Spain) N Almagro (Spain) D Ferrer	6	3	[8]
(Switzerland) Y Allegro (Switzerland) R Federer	4	6	[10]
(Finland) J Nieminen (Australia) T Perry	6	3	[6]
(France) A Clément (France) R Gasquet	4	6	[10]
(France) J Benneteau (France) M Llodra	5	3
WC	(Canada) F Dancevic (Canada) F Niemeyer	7	6
(Chile) F González (Croatia) I Ljubičić	6^{3}	6	[10]
(United States) J Blake (United Kingdom) J Murray	7^{7}	3	[8]

Second round
1	(United States) B Bryan (United States) M Bryan	7^{9}	6^{8}	[10]
(Switzerland) Y Allegro (Switzerland) R Federer	6^{7}	7^{10}	[7]
(France) A Clément (France) R Gasquet	3	6	[10]
7	(Sweden) S Aspelin (Austria) J Knowle	6	4	[5]
4	(Czech Republic) M Damm (India) L Paes	w/o
WC	(Canada) F Dancevic (Canada) F Niemeyer
(Chile) F González (Croatia) I Ljubičić	4	2
8	(India) M Bhupathi (Czech Republic) P Vízner	6	6

Quarterfinals
1	(United States) B Bryan (United States) M Bryan	6	7^{7}
(France) A Clément (France) R Gasquet	2	6^{3}
4	(Czech Republic) M Damm (India) L Paes	6^{7}	6	[8]
8	(India) M Bhupathi (Czech Republic) P Vízner	7^{9}	2	[10]

Semifinals
1	(United States) B Bryan (United States) M Bryan	2	6	[10]
8	(India) M Bhupathi (Czech Republic) P Vízner	6	4	[12]

=== Bottom half ===
First round
(Serbia) N Djokovic (Serbia) N Zimonjić	6	6
(Poland) M Fyrstenberg (Poland) M Matkowski	4	3
(Czech Republic) T Berdych (Germany) N Kiefer	6	6
(Argentina) G Cañas (Argentina) M García	1	2
WC	(Canada) P Bester (Canada) P-L Duclos	4	4
(Australia) L Hewitt (Spain) R Nadal	6	6
(Slovakia) D Hrbatý (France) P-H Mathieu	5	4
(Russia) D Tursunov (Netherlands) R Wassen	7	6

Second round
5	(Australia) P Hanley (Zimbabwe) K Ullyett	6	6
(Serbia) N Djokovic (Serbia) N Zimonjić	3	2
(Czech Republic) T Berdych (Germany) N Kiefer	3	4
3	(The Bahamas) M Knowles (Canada) D Nestor	6	6
6	(Israel) J Erlich (Israel) A Ram	w/o
(Australia) L Hewitt (Spain) R Nadal
(Russia) D Tursunov (Netherlands) R Wassen	3	1
2	(Sweden) J Björkman (Belarus) M Mirnyi	6	6

Quarterfinals
5	(Australia) P Hanley (Zimbabwe) K Ullyett	7^{7}	6
3	(The Bahamas) M Knowles (Canada) D Nestor	6^{5}	4
6	(Israel) J Erlich (Israel) A Ram	6	7
2	(Sweden) J Björkman (Belarus) M Mirnyi	1	5

Semifinals
5	(Australia) P Hanley (Zimbabwe) K Ullyett	6	6
6	(Israel) J Erlich (Israel) A Ram	2	3
