= 2007 East West Bank Classic – Singles =

Singles
- 2007 East West Bank Classic

Final
- Champion: (Serbia) Ana Ivanovic
- Runner-up: (Russia) Nadia Petrova
- Score: 7–5, 6–4

Details
- Draw: 56
- Seeds: 16

Events
Singles	Doubles
- WTA Los Angeles

Elena Dementieva was the defending champion, but she was defeated in the quarterfinals by Maria Sharapova.

Ana Ivanovic won in the final 7–5, 6–4, against Nadia Petrova, despite being two match points down in the third set of the semifinals against Jelena Janković. It was her second title of the year and her fourth overall.

== Seeds ==
The top eight seeds received a bye into the second round.

1. (Russia) Maria Sharapova (semifinals, withdrew due to a left leg strain)
2. (Serbia) Jelena Janković (semifinals)
3. (Serbia) Ana Ivanovic (champion)
4. (Russia) Nadia Petrova (final)
5. (Slovakia) Daniela Hantuchová (third round, retired due to a respiratory illness)
6. (France) Marion Bartoli (second round)
7. (Switzerland) Martina Hingis (second round)
8. (Russia) Dinara Safina (second round)
9. (Russia) Elena Dementieva (quarterfinals)
10. (Israel) Shahar Pe'er (second round)
11. (France) Tatiana Golovin (first round, retired due to a right hamstring strain)
12. (China) Li Na (withdrew due to a right rib stress fracture)
13. (Austria) Sybille Bammer (third round)
14. (Ukraine) Alona Bondarenko (first round)
15. (Slovenia) Katarina Srebotnik (third round)
16. (Czech Republic) Lucie Šafářová (third round)

== Draw ==
Key

- Q = Qualifier
- WC = Wild card
- LL = Lucky loser
- Alt = Alternate
- ITF = ITF entry
- PR = Protected ranking
- SR = Special ranking
- SE = Special exempt
- JE = Junior exempt
- JR = Junior Accelerator Programme entrant
- CO = College Accelerator Programme entrant
- NG = Next Gen Accelerator Program entrant
- w/o = Walkover
- r = Retired
- d = Defaulted

=== Finals ===
Quarterfinals
1	(Russia) Maria Sharapova	6	6
9	(Russia) Elena Dementieva	3	4
4	(Russia) Nadia Petrova	6^{3}	6	6
(France) Virginie Razzano	7	4	1
(Russia) Maria Kirilenko	4	4
3/WC	(Serbia) Ana Ivanovic	6	6
(Belarus) Victoria Azarenka	4	7	2
2	(Serbia) Jelena Janković	6	6^{5}	6

Semifinals
1	(Russia) Maria Sharapova
4	(Russia) Nadia Petrova	w/o
3/WC	(Serbia) Ana Ivanovic	4	6	7
2	(Serbia) Jelena Janković	6	3	5

Final
4	(Russia) Nadia Petrova	5	4
3/WC	(Serbia) Ana Ivanovic	7	6

=== Top half ===
==== Section 1 ====
First round
(Greece) E Daniilidou	3	6	6
(France) A Rezaï	6	2	1
(France) S Brémond	3	1
(Netherlands) M Krajicek	6	6
Q	(Ukraine) Y Fedak	1	6	6
14	(Ukraine) A Bondarenko	6	2	3
9	(Russia) E Dementieva	6	6
Q	(Russia) E Makarova	3	1
(Italy) F Pennetta	1	3
WC	(United States) M Brengle	6	6
(Russia) A Kudryavtseva	5	3
(United States) J Craybas	7	6

Second round
1	(Russia) M Sharapova	7	3
(Greece) E Daniilidou	6^{5}	1	r
(Netherlands) M Krajicek	6	6
Q	(Ukraine) Y Fedak	4	3
9	(Russia) E Dementieva	6	6
WC	(United States) M Brengle	2	0
(United States) J Craybas	3	6^{5}
6	(Slovakia) D Hantuchová	6	7

Third round
1	(Russia) M Sharapova	7	6^{3}	6
(Netherlands) M Krajicek	6^{4}	7	4
9	(Russia) E Dementieva	6	4
5	(Slovakia) D Hantuchová	3	1	r

Quarterfinals
1	(Russia) M Sharapova	6	6
9	(Russia) E Dementieva	3	4

==== Section 2 ====
First round
(Australia) A Molik	2	4
Q	(United States) L Osterloh	6	6
(Russia) A Rodionova	1	6^{3}
(Italy) M Santangelo	6	7
LL	(United States) B Mattek	4	5
15	(Slovenia) K Srebotnik	6	7
10	(Israel) S Pe'er	6	6
WC	(Slovakia) D Cibulková	2	3
(France) V Razzano	6	7
Q	(China) Z Yan	4	5
(India) S Mirza	6	6
Q	(Canada) A Wozniak	3	2

Second round
4	(Russia) N Petrova	7	6
Q	(United States) L Osterloh	5	3
(Italy) M Santangelo	0	r
15	(Slovenia) K Srebotnik	5
10	(Israel) S Pe'er	1	6	6^{6}
(France) V Razzano	6	4	7
(India) S Mirza	6	2	6
7	(Switzerland) M Hingis	2	6	4

Third round
4	(Russia) N Petrova	6	6
15	(Slovenia) K Srebotnik	1	2
(France) V Razzano	6	7
(India) S Mirza	1	6^{6}

Quarterfinals
4	(Russia) N Petrova	6^{3}	6	6
(France) V Razzano	7	4	1

=== Bottom half ===
==== Section 3 ====
First round
(Russia) M Kirilenko	7	6
(Russia) E Bovina	6^{8}	3
Q	(China) T Sun	5	4
(Argentina) G Dulko	7	6
(Thailand) T Tanasugarn	7	0
11	(France) T Golovin	5	0	r
16	(Czech Republic) L Šafářová	7	6
(Russia) O Poutchkova	5	2
(France) C Pin	7	3	3
(Japan) A Sugiyama	5	6	6
WC	(United States) J Jackson	4	1
Q	(United States) A Harkleroad	6	6

Second round
6	(France) M Bartoli	6^{2}	3
(Russia) M Kirilenko	7	6
(Argentina) G Dulko	6	6
(Thailand) T Tanasugarn	1	3
16	(Czech Republic) L Šafářová	6	6
(Japan) A Sugiyama	3	4
(United States) A Harkleroad	4	2
3/WC	(Serbia) A Ivanovic	6	6

Third round
(Russia) M Kirilenko	6	6
(Argentina) G Dulko	3	4
16	(Czech Republic) L Šafářová	2	2
3/WC	(Serbia) A Ivanovic	6	6

Quarterfinals
(Russia) M Kirilenko	4	4
3/WC	(Serbia) A Ivanovic	6	6

==== Section 4 ====
First round
(Ukraine) K Bondarenko	7	6
(Germany) A Kerber	5	1
(United States) V King	2	4
(United States) M Shaughnessy	6	6
(Belarus) V Azarenka	6	6
LL	(Italy) A Brianti	3	3
13	(Austria) S Bammer	6	6
(United States) L Granville	4	2
(Ukraine) J Vakulenko	0	3
Q	(Belarus) O Govortsova	6	6
LL	(Russia) Y Shvedova	3	4
(China) S Peng	6	6

Second round
8	(Russia) D Safina	2	5
(Ukraine) K Bondarenko	6	7
(United States) M Shaughnessy	2	3
(Belarus) V Azarenka	6	6
13	(Austria) S Bammer	6	6
Q	(Belarus) O Govortsova	2	1
(China) S Peng	1	1
2	(Serbia) J Janković	6	6

Third round
(Ukraine) K Bondarenko	1	2
(Belarus) V Azarenka	6	6
13	(Austria) S Bammer	2	1
2	(Serbia) J Janković	6	6

Quarterfinals
(Belarus) V Azarenka	4	7	2
2	(Serbia) J Janković	6	6^{5}	6
