= 2007 Qatar Telecom German Open – Singles =

Singles
- 2007 Qatar Telecom German Open

Final
- Champion: (Serbia) Ana Ivanovic
- Runner-up: (Russia) Svetlana Kuznetsova
- Score: 3–6, 6–4, 7–6^{(7–4)}

Details
- Draw: 56 (3WC/8Q/1LL)
- Seeds: 17

Events
Singles	Doubles
- German Open (WTA)

Ana Ivanovic defeated Svetlana Kuznetsova in the final, 3–6, 6–4, 7–6^{(7–4)} to win the singles tennis title at the 2007 WTA German Open.

Nadia Petrova was the defending champion, but lost in the quarterfinals to Kuznetsova.

== Seeds ==
The top eight seeds received a bye into the second round.

1. (Belgium) Justine Henin (semifinals)
2. (France) Amélie Mauresmo (third round)
3. (Russia) Svetlana Kuznetsova (finals)
4. (Switzerland) Martina Hingis (third round)
5. (Serbia) Jelena Janković (quarterfinals)
6. (Czech Republic) ~~Nicole Vaidišová~~ (withdrew due to right wrist injury)
7. (Russia) Nadia Petrova (quarterfinals)
8. (Russia) Dinara Safina (quarterfinals)
9. (Russia) Anna Chakvetadze (second round)
10. (Russia) Elena Dementieva (third round)
11. (Slovakia) Daniela Hantuchová (first round)
12. (Serbia) Ana Ivanovic (champion)
13. (Israel) Shahar Pe'er (second round)
14. (China) Li Na (second round)
15. (Switzerland) Patty Schnyder (quarterfinals)
16. (Slovenia) Katarina Srebotnik (first round)
17. (Italy) Tathiana Garbin (second round)

== Draw ==
Key

- Q = Qualifier
- WC = Wild card
- LL = Lucky loser
- Alt = Alternate
- ITF = ITF entry
- PR = Protected ranking
- SR = Special ranking
- SE = Special exempt
- JE = Junior exempt
- JR = Junior Accelerator Programme entrant
- CO = College Accelerator Programme entrant
- NG = Next Gen Accelerator Program entrant
- w/o = Walkover
- r = Retired
- d = Defaulted

=== Finals ===
Quarterfinals
1	(Belgium) Justine Henin	3	6	6
5	(Serbia) Jelena Janković	6	4	4
3	(Russia) Svetlana Kuznetsova	7	6
7	(Russia) Nadia Petrova	6^{5}	4
12	(Serbia) Ana Ivanovic	7	3	6
15	(Switzerland) Patty Schnyder	5	6	4
8	(Russia) Dinara Safina	3	7	3
(Ukraine) Julia Vakulenko	6	5	6

Semifinals
1	(Belgium) Justine Henin	4	7	4
3	(Russia) Svetlana Kuznetsova	6	5	6
12	(Serbia) Ana Ivanovic	4
(Ukraine) Julia Vakulenko	3^{r}

Final
3	(Russia) Svetlana Kuznetsova	6	4	6^{4}
12	(Serbia) Ana Ivanovic	3	6	7

=== Top half ===
==== Section 1 ====
First round
(Russia) V Bardina	1	3
WC	(Germany) T Malek	6	6
(China) J Zheng	6	3	4
(Italy) ME Camerin	3	6	6
(Russia) M Kirilenko	1	6	1
14	(China) N Li	6	3	6
11	(Slovakia) D Hantuchová	1	3
Q	(Czech Republic) Z Ondrášková	6	6
(China) S Peng	6	7
Q	(Germany) A Petkovic	3	5
(France) A Rezaï	6	6	0
(Spain) A Medina Garrigues	7	4	6

Second round
1	(Belgium) J Henin	6	6
WC	(Germany) T Malek	1	1
(Italy) ME Camerin	4	6	6
14	(China) N Li	6	3	3
Q	(Czech Republic) Z Ondrášková	5	1
(China) S Peng	7	6
(Spain) A Medina Garrigues	3	6	5
5	(Serbia) J Janković	6	2	7

Third round
1	(Belgium) J Henin	6	6
(Italy) ME Camerin	1	3
(China) S Peng	1	7	3^{r}
5	(Serbia) J Janković	6	6^{3}	2

Quarterfinals
1	(Belgium) J Henin	3	6	6
5	(Serbia) J Janković	6	4	4

==== Section 2 ====
First round
(Austria) S Bammer	7	6
Q	(Germany) A Roesch	5	1
(Greece) E Daniilidou	0	2
(Germany) M Müller	6	6
(Germany) A-L Grönefeld	1	2
13	(Israel) S Pe'er	6	6
10	(Russia) E Dementieva	4	6	6
(Italy) M Santangelo	6	1	4
(United States) M Shaughnessy	7	6
LL	(Austria) T Paszek	6^{3}	2
WC	(Germany) S Lisicki	2	1
(France) S Brémond	6	6

Second round
3	(Russia) S Kuznetsova	6	7
(Austria) S Bammer	1	5
(Germany) M Müller	6	7
13	(Israel) S Pe'er	2	6^{2}
10	(Russia) E Dementieva	5	6	6
(United States) M Shaughnessy	7	3	1
(France) S Brémond	4	2
7	(Russia) N Petrova	6	6

Third round
3	(Russia) S Kuznetsova	6	6
(Germany) M Müller	3	2
10	(Russia) E Dementieva	3	3
7	(Russia) N Petrova	6	6

Quarterfinals
3	(Russia) S Kuznetsova	7	6
7	(Russia) N Petrova	6^{5}	4

=== Bottom half ===
==== Section 3 ====
First round
(Italy) F Schiavone	7	2	5
(Ukraine) A Bondarenko	5	6	7
(Russia) E Likhovtseva	7	3	6
(France) É Loit	5	6	1
(United States) L Granville	2	1
12	(Serbia) A Ivanović	6	6
15	(Switzerland) P Schnyder	6	7
(Italy) R Vinci	0	5
Q	(Russia) G Voskoboeva	4	3
Q	(Spain) V Ruano Pascual	6	6
(Estonia) K Kanepi	7	6^{3}	2
Q	(Ukraine) K Bondarenko	5	7	6

Second round
17	(Italy) T Garbin	4	3
(Ukraine) A Bondarenko	6	6
(Russia) E Likhovtseva	3	2
12	(Serbia) A Ivanović	6	6
15	(Switzerland) P Schnyder	6	6
Q	(Spain) V Ruano Pascual	0	1
Q	(Ukraine) K Bondarenko	5	6^{7}
4	(Switzerland) M Hingis	7	7

Third round
(Ukraine) A Bondarenko	3	0^{r}
12	(Serbia) A Ivanović	6	5
15	(Switzerland) P Schnyder	6	6
4	(Switzerland) M Hingis	4	0

Quarterfinals
12	(Serbia) A Ivanović	7	3	6
15	(Switzerland) P Schnyder	5	6	4

==== Section 4 ====
First round
(Spain) L Domínguez Lino	6	6
(Russia) E Vesnina	2	1
Q	(Ukraine) O Savchuk	3	7	0
(Czech Republic) L Šafářová	6	6^{6}	6
(Australia) S Stosur	6	6^{1}	6^{5}
9	(Russia) A Chakvetadze	3	7	7
16	(Slovenia) K Srebotnik	3	6	3
(United States) M Tu	6	4	6
(Italy) F Pennetta	3	2
(Ukraine) J Vakulenko	6	6
Q	(China) Z Yan	4	6	6
WC	(Germany) K Barrois	6	3	2

Second round
8	(Russia) D Safina	6	6
(Spain) L Domínguez Lino	4	3
(Czech Republic) L Šafářová	6	6
9	(Russia) A Chakvetadze	4	4
(United States) M Tu	1	6^{4}
(Ukraine) J Vakulenko	6	7
Q	(China) Z Yan	3	3
2	(France) A Mauresmo	6	6

Third round
8	(Russia) D Safina	3	6	6
(Czech Republic) L Šafářová	6	3	2
(Ukraine) J Vakulenko	2	6	6
2	(France) A Mauresmo	6	1	2

Quarterfinals
8	(Russia) D Safina	3	7	3
(Ukraine) J Vakulenko	6	5	6

== Qualifying ==
=== Qualifying seeds ===
1. (Russia) ~~Vera Dushevina~~ (withdrew)
2. (Russia) Yaroslava Shvedova (first round)
3. (Czech Republic) Eva Birnerová (first round)
4. (Ukraine) Kateryna Bondarenko (qualified)
5. (Croatia) Jelena Kostanić Tošić (first round)
6. (Austria) Tamira Paszek (qualifying competition, lucky loser)
7. (Luxembourg) Anne Kremer (qualifying competition)
8. (Israel) Tzipora Obziler (qualifying competition)
9. (Czech Republic) Zuzana Ondrášková (qualified)
10. (Spain) Virginia Ruano Pascual (qualified)
11. (Russia) Galina Voskoboeva (qualified)
12. (Czech Republic) Hana Šromová (qualifying competition)
13. (Ukraine) Yuliana Fedak (qualifying competition)
14. (Ukraine) Olga Savchuk (qualified)
15. (Georgia (country)) Margalita Chakhnashvili (qualifying competition)
16. (Slovenia) Andreja Klepač (qualifying competition)

=== Qualifiers ===
1. (Russia) Galina Voskoboeva
2. (Germany) Andrea Petkovic
3. (Germany) Angelika Rösch
4. (Ukraine) Kateryna Bondarenko
5. (China) Yan ZI
6. (Czech Republic) Zuzana Ondrášková
7. (Spain) Virginia Ruano Pascual
8. (Ukraine) Olga Savchuk

=== Lucky loser ===
1. (Austria) Tamira Paszek

=== Qualifying draw ===
==== First qualifier ====
First round
(Germany) Antonia Matic	4	6^{3}
WC	(Germany) Dominice Ripoll	6	7^{7}
(Germany) Stephanie Gehrlein	1	5
11	(Russia) Galina Voskoboeva	6	7

Qualifying competition
WC	(Germany) Dominice Ripoll	1	0
11	(Russia) Galina Voskoboeva	6	6

==== Second qualifier ====
First round
2	(Russia) Yaroslava Shvedova	4	6	5
(Germany) Andrea Petkovic	6	3	7
WC	(Russia) Ksenia Pervak	4	3
15	(Georgia (country)) Margalita Chakhnashvili	6	6

Qualifying competition
(Germany) Andrea Petkovic	2	6	7^{7}
15	(Georgia (country)) Margalita Chakhnashvili	6	3	6^{5}

==== Third qualifier ====
First round
3	(Czech Republic) Eva Birnerová	6^{5}	6	1
WC	(Germany) Angelika Rösch	7^{7}	1	6
(Germany) Vanessa Henke	4	6	2
12	(Czech Republic) Hana Šromová	6	0	6

Qualifying competition
WC	(Germany) Angelika Rösch	7	2	6
12	(Czech Republic) Hana Šromová	5	6	3

==== Fourth qualifier ====
First round
4	(Ukraine) Kateryna Bondarenko	6	6
(Germany) Julia Görges	4	3
(Germany) Gréta Arn
13	(Ukraine) Yuliana Fedak	w/o

Qualifying competition
4	(Ukraine) Kateryna Bondarenko	2	7^{7}	6
13	(Ukraine) Yuliana Fedak	6	6^{5}	1

==== Fifth qualifier ====
First round
5	(Croatia) Jelena Kostanić Tošić	1	1
(China) Yan Zi	6	6
(Czech Republic) Květa Peschke	4	2
16	(Slovenia) Andreja Klepač	6	6

Qualifying competition
(China) Yan Zi	7	6
16	(Slovenia) Andreja Klepač	5	3

==== Sixth qualifier ====
First round
6	(Austria) Tamira Paszek	6	6
(Germany) Carmen Klaschka	2	4
WC	(Germany) Syna Kayser	1	3
9	(Czech Republic) Zuzana Ondrášková	6	6

Qualifying competition
6	(Austria) Tamira Paszek	6	4	3
9	(Czech Republic) Zuzana Ondrášková	4	6	6

==== Seventh qualifier ====
First round
7	(Luxembourg) Anne Kremer	6	7
(Germany) Sabine Klaschka	0	5
(Germany) Kathrin Wörle	1	3
10	(Spain) Virginia Ruano Pascual	6	6

Qualifying competition
7	(Luxembourg) Anne Kremer	0	6^{4}
10	(Spain) Virginia Ruano Pascual	6	7^{7}

==== Eighth qualifier ====
First round
8	(Israel) Tzipora Obziler	6	6
(Germany) Justine Ozga	1	2
(Germany) Tanja Ostertag	2	1
14	(Ukraine) Olga Savchuk	6	6

Qualifying competition
8	(Israel) Tzipora Obziler	2	7	1
14	(Ukraine) Olga Savchuk	6	5	6
