= 2007 Qatar Telecom German Open =

- Date: 5 – 13 May
- Edition: 96th
- Category: Tier I
- Draw: 56S / 28D
- Prize money: $1,340,000
- Surface: Clay / outdoor
- Location: Berlin, Germany
- Venue: Rot-Weiss Tennis Club

Champions

Singles
- (Serbia) Ana Ivanovic

Doubles
- (United States) Lisa Raymond / (Australia) Samantha Stosur
- WTA German Open

The 2007 Qatar Telecom German Open was a women's tennis event that was played from May 5 to May 13, 2007. It was one of two Tier I events that took place on red clay in the build-up to the second Grand Slam of the year, the French Open. It was the 96th edition of the tournament and was played at the Rot-Weiss Tennis Club in the German capital of Berlin. The tournaments offered a total prize fund of US$1,300,000 across all rounds.

Serbian Ana Ivanovic won the title, defeating rival Svetlana Kuznetsova in the final. The title, her second in the Tier I category and her third title overall, saw her enter the world's Top 10 for the first time, where she would remain for two years. En route to the title, two of her opponents retired due to injuries: Alona Bondarenko in the third round, who was trailing 3–6, 0–5 at deuce; and Julia Vakulenko, who was 3–4 down in the first set in the semi-finals.

== Finals ==
=== Singles ===
(Serbia) Ana Ivanovic defeated (Russia) Svetlana Kuznetsova, 3–6, 6–4, 7–6^{(7–4)}

=== Doubles ===
(United States) Lisa Raymond / (Australia) Samantha Stosur defeated (Italy) Tathiana Garbin / (Italy) Roberta Vinci, 6–3, 6–4

== Prize money and points ==
Total prize money: US$1,300,000

| Round | Singles | | Doubles | |
| Round | Prize money (US$) | WTA ranking points | Prize money (US$) | WTA ranking points |
|---|---|---|---|---|
| Winner | 196,900 | 430 | 59,000 | 430 |
| Finalist | 100,000 | 300 | 30,000 | 300 |
| Semifinal | 51,000 | 195 | 15,351 | 195 |
| Quarterfinal | 26,050 | 110 | 7,800 | 110 |
| Round of 16 | 13,285 | 60 | 3,980 | 60 |
| Round of 32 | 6,775 | 35 | 2,030 | 1 |
| Round of 64 | 3,455 | 1 | - | - |
