= LA Women's Tennis Championships =

Defunct tennis tournament
- Founded: 1971
- Abolished: 2009
- Editions: 36
- Location: Long Beach, California; Los Angeles, California; Manhattan Beach, California; Carson, California; United States
- Venue: Home Depot Center
- Category: Premier
- Surface: Carpet / indoor Hard / outdoor
- Draw: 56S / 32SQ / 16D
- Prize money: US$700,000 (2009)

The LA Women's Tennis Championships was a Premier-level women's tennis tournament on the WTA Tour held in Carson, California, a suburb of Los Angeles. The tournament was played on outdoor hard courts and a part of the US Open Series.

The tournament was founded in 1971 as the Billie Jean King Invitational as part of the inaugural Virginia Slims Circuit in Long Beach, California in 1971 by Jerry Diamond, one of the tour's organizers. In 1973, it moved to Los Angeles. The event was off the tour calendar for three years (1974–1976) when the season-ending championships were played in Los Angeles. The tournament was an indoor event until 1983, when it switched to outdoor hard courts in Manhattan Beach where it stayed for 20 years. IMG bought the event from Diamond in 1996. The event was moved to its final location in Carson in 2003. It was acquired by its new landlord, AEG, in 2004.

In 2009 AEG and USTA sold the tournament to Octagon, who moved the event to Carlsbad, California. It was renamed the Mercury Insurance Open.

== Past finals ==
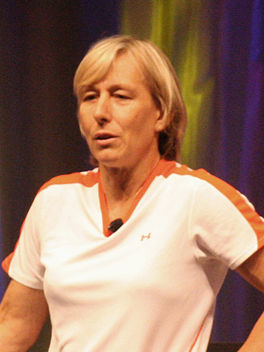
Martina Navratilova a "Tennis Champion"

- Martina Navratilova was the most successful player winning 8 singles titles.

=== Singles ===
Year	Location	Champion	Runner-up	Score	Name
1971	Long Beach	(United States) Billie Jean King	(United States) Rosemary Casals	6–1, 6–2	Billie Jean King Invitational
1972	Long Beach	(United States) Rosemary Casals	(France) Françoise Dürr	6–2, 6–7^{(4–5)}, 6–3	Independent Press-Telegram's; Women's Tennis Championships
1973	Los Angeles	(Australia) Margaret Court	(United States) Nancy Gunter	7–5, 6–7^{(1–5)}, 7–5	British Motor Cars Tournament
1974–76	Los Angeles	Not held			
1977	Los Angeles	(United States) Chris Evert	(United States) Martina Navratilova	6–2, 2–6, 6–1	Virginia Slims of Los Angeles
1978	Los Angeles	(United States) Martina Navratilova	(United States) Rosemary Casals	6–3, 6–2	Virginia Slims of Los Angeles
1979	Los Angeles	(United States) Chris Evert (2)	(United States) Martina Navratilova	6–3, 6–4	Avon Championships of Los Angeles
1980	Los Angeles	(United States) Martina Navratilova (2)	(United States) Tracy Austin	6–2, 6–0	Avon Championships of Los Angeles
1981	Los Angeles	(United States) Martina Navratilova (3)	(United States) Andrea Jaeger	6–4, 6–0	Avon Championships of Los Angeles
1982	Los Angeles	(Socialist Federal Republic of Yugoslavia) Mima Jaušovec	(West Germany) Sylvia Hanika	6–2, 7–6^{(7–4)}	Avon Championships of Los Angeles
1983	Manhattan Beach	(United States) Martina Navratilova (4)	(United States) Chris Evert	6–1, 6–3	Virginia Slims of Los Angeles (II)
1984	Manhattan Beach	(United States) Chris Evert (3)	(Australia) Wendy Turnbull	6–2, 6–3	Virginia Slims of Los Angeles (II)
1985	Manhattan Beach	(West Germany) Claudia Kohde-Kilsch	(United States) Pam Shriver	6–2, 6–4	Virginia Slims of Los Angeles (II)
1986	Manhattan Beach	(United States) Martina Navratilova (5)	(United States) Chris Evert	7–6^{(7–5)}, 6–3	Virginia Slims of Los Angeles (II)
1987	Manhattan Beach	(West Germany) Steffi Graf	(United States) Chris Evert	6–3, 6–4	Virginia Slims of Los Angeles (II)
1988	Manhattan Beach	(United States) Chris Evert (4)	(Argentina) Gabriela Sabatini	2–6, 6–1, 6–1	Virginia Slims of Los Angeles (II)
1989	Manhattan Beach	(United States) Martina Navratilova (6)	(Argentina) Gabriela Sabatini	6–0, 6–2	Virginia Slims of Los Angeles (II)
1990	Manhattan Beach	(Socialist Federal Republic of Yugoslavia) Monica Seleš	(United States) Martina Navratilova	6–4, 3–6, 7–6^{(8–6)}	Virginia Slims of Los Angeles (II)
1991	Manhattan Beach	(Socialist Federal Republic of Yugoslavia) Monica Seleš (2)	(Japan) Kimiko Date	6–3, 6–1	Virginia Slims of Los Angeles (II)
1992	Manhattan Beach	(United States) Martina Navratilova (7)	(Federal Republic of Yugoslavia) Monica Seleš	6–4, 6–2	Virginia Slims of Los Angeles (II)
1993	Manhattan Beach	(United States) Martina Navratilova (8)	(Spain) Arantxa Sánchez Vicario	7–5, 7–6^{(7–4)}	Virginia Slims of Los Angeles (II)
1994	Manhattan Beach	(United States) Amy Frazier	(United States) Ann Grossman	6–1, 6–3	Virginia Slims of Los Angeles (II)
1995	Manhattan Beach	(Spain) Conchita Martínez	(United States) Chanda Rubin	4–6, 6–1, 6–3	Acura Classic
1996	Manhattan Beach	(United States) Lindsay Davenport	(Germany) Anke Huber	6–2, 6–3	Acura Classic
1997	Manhattan Beach	(United States) Monica Seles (3)	(United States) Lindsay Davenport	5–7, 7–5, 6–4	Acura Classic
1998	Manhattan Beach	(United States) Lindsay Davenport (2)	(Switzerland) Martina Hingis	4–6, 6–4, 6–3	Acura Classic
1999	Manhattan Beach	(United States) Serena Williams	(France) Julie Halard-Decugis	6–1, 6–4	Acura Classic
2000	Manhattan Beach	(United States) Serena Williams (2)	(United States) Lindsay Davenport	4–6, 6–4, 7–6^{(7–1)}	estyle.com Classic
2001	Manhattan Beach	(United States) Lindsay Davenport (3)	(United States) Monica Seleš	6–3, 7–5	estyle.com Classic
2002	Manhattan Beach	(United States) Chanda Rubin	(United States) Lindsay Davenport	5–7, 7–6^{(7–5)}, 6–3	JPMorgan Chase Open
2003	Carson	(Belgium) Kim Clijsters	(United States) Lindsay Davenport	6–1, 3–6, 6–1	JPMorgan Chase Open
2004	Carson	(United States) Lindsay Davenport (4)	(United States) Serena Williams	6–1, 6–3	JPMorgan Chase Open
2005	Carson	(Belgium) Kim Clijsters (2)	(Slovakia) Daniela Hantuchová	6–4, 6–1	JPMorgan Chase Open
2006	Carson	(Russia) Elena Dementieva	(Serbia) Jelena Janković	6–3, 4–6, 6–4	JPMorgan Chase Open
2007	Carson	(Serbia) Ana Ivanovic	(Russia) Nadia Petrova	7–5, 6–4	East West Bank Classic
2008	Carson	(Russia) Dinara Safina	(Italy) Flavia Pennetta	6–4, 6–2	East West Bank Classic
2009	Carson	(Italy) Flavia Pennetta	(Australia) Samantha Stosur	6–4, 6–3	LA Women's Tennis Championships
2010	Succeeded by San Diego Open				

=== Doubles ===
Year	Location	Champion	Runner-up	Score	Name
1971	Long Beach	(United States) Rosemary Casals (United States) Billie Jean King	(France) Françoise Dürr (United Kingdom) Ann Haydon-Jones	7–5, 6–3	Billie Jean King Invitational
1972	Long Beach	(United States) Rosemary Casals (2) (United Kingdom) Virginia Wade	(Australia) Helen Gourlay (Australia) Karen Krantzcke	6–4, 5–7, 7–5	Independent Press-Telegram's; Women's Tennis Championships
1973	Los Angeles	(United States) Rosemary Casals (3) (United States) Julie Heldman	(Australia) Margaret Court (Australia) Lesley Hunt	walkover	British Motor Cars Tournament
1974–76	Los Angeles	Not held			
1977	Los Angeles	(United States) Rosemary Casals (4) (United States) Chris Evert	(United States) Martina Navratilova (Netherlands) Betty Stöve	6–2, 6–4	Virginia Slims of Los Angeles
1978	Los Angeles	(Netherlands) Betty Stöve (United Kingdom) Virginia Wade (2)	(South Africa) Greer Stevens (United States) Pam Teeguarden	6–3, 6–2	Virginia Slims of Los Angeles
1979	Los Angeles	(United States) Rosemary Casals (5) (United States) Chris Evert (2)	(United States) Martina Navratilova (United States) Anne Smith	6–4, 1–6, 6–3	Avon Championships of Los Angeles
1980	Los Angeles	(United States) Rosemary Casals (6) (United States) Martina Navratilova	(United States) Kathy Jordan (United States) Anne Smith	7–6, 6–2	Avon Championships of Los Angeles
1981	Los Angeles	(United Kingdom) Sue Barker (United States) Ann Kiyomura	(United States) Marita Redondo (United States) Peanut Louie	6–1, 4–6, 6–1	Avon Championships of Los Angeles
1982	Los Angeles	(United States) Kathy Jordan (United States) Anne Smith	(United States) Barbara Potter (United States) Sharon Walsh	6–3, 7–5	Avon Championships of Los Angeles
1983	Manhattan Beach	(United States) Martina Navratilova (2) (United States) Pam Shriver	(United States) Betsy Nagelsen (Romania) Virginia Ruzici	6–1, 6–0	Virginia Slims of Los Angeles (II)
1984	Manhattan Beach	(United States) Chris Evert Lloyd (3) (Australia) Wendy Turnbull	(West Germany) Bettina Bunge (West Germany) Eva Pfaff	6–2, 6–4	Virginia Slims of Los Angeles (II)
1985	Manhattan Beach	(West Germany) Claudia Kohde-Kilsch (Czechoslovakia) Helena Suková	(Czechoslovakia) Hana Mandlíková (Australia) Wendy Turnbull	6–4, 6–2	Virginia Slims of Los Angeles (II)
1986	Manhattan Beach	(United States) Martina Navratilova (3) (United States) Pam Shriver (2)	(West Germany) Claudia Kohde-Kilsch (Czechoslovakia) Helena Suková	6–4, 6–3	Virginia Slims of Los Angeles (II)
1987	Manhattan Beach	(United States) Martina Navratilova (4) (United States) Pam Shriver (3)	(United States) Zina Garrison (United States) Lori McNeil	6–3, 6–4	Virginia Slims of Los Angeles (II)
1988	Manhattan Beach	(United States) Patty Fendick (Canada) Jill Hetherington	(United States) Gigi Fernández (United States) Robin White	7–6^{(7–2)}, 5–7, 6–4	Virginia Slims of Los Angeles (II)
1989	Manhattan Beach	(United States) Martina Navratilova (5) (Australia) Wendy Turnbull (2)	(West Germany) Claudia Kohde-Kilsch (United States) Mary Joe Fernández	5-2 retired	Virginia Slims of Los Angeles (II)
1990	Manhattan Beach	(United States) Gigi Fernández (Czechoslovakia) Jana Novotná	(Argentina) Mercedes Paz (Argentina) Gabriela Sabatini	6–3, 4–6, 6–4	Virginia Slims of Los Angeles (II)
1991	Manhattan Beach	(Soviet Union) Larisa Savchenko (Soviet Union) Natalia Zvereva	(United States) Gretchen Rush Magers (United States) Robin White	6–1, 2–6, 6–2	Virginia Slims of Los Angeles (II)
1992	Manhattan Beach	(Spain) Arantxa Sánchez Vicario (Czechoslovakia) Helena Suková (2)	(United States) Zina Garrison (United States) Pam Shriver	6–4, 6–2	Virginia Slims of Los Angeles (II)
1993	Manhattan Beach	(Spain) Arantxa Sánchez Vicario (2) (Czech Republic) Helena Suková (3)	(United States) Gigi Fernández (Belarus) Natalia Zvereva	7–6^{(7–3)}, 6–3	Virginia Slims of Los Angeles (II)
1994	Manhattan Beach	(France) Julie Halard (France) Nathalie Tauziat	(Czech Republic) Jana Novotná (United States) Lisa Raymond	6–1, 0–6, 6–1	Virginia Slims of Los Angeles (II)
1995	Manhattan Beach	(United States) Gigi Fernández (2) (Belarus) Natasha Zvereva (2)	(Argentina) Gabriela Sabatini (Latvia) Larisa Savchenko Neiland	7–5, 6–7^{(2–7)}, 7–5	Acura Classic
1996	Manhattan Beach	(United States) Lindsay Davenport (Belarus) Natasha Zvereva (3)	(United States) Amy Frazier (United States) Kimberly Po	6–1, 6–4	Acura Classic
1997	Manhattan Beach	(Indonesia) Yayuk Basuki (Netherlands) Caroline Vis	(Latvia) Larisa Savchenko Neiland (Czech Republic) Helena Suková	7–6^{(9–7)}, 6–3	Acura Classic
1998	Manhattan Beach	(Switzerland) Martina Hingis (Belarus) Natasha Zvereva (4)	(Thailand) Tamarine Tanasugarn (Ukraine) Elena Tatarkova	6–4, 6–2	Acura Classic
1999	Manhattan Beach	(Spain) Arantxa Sánchez Vicario (3) (Latvia) Larisa Savchenko Neiland	(United States) Lisa Raymond (Australia) Rennae Stubbs	6–2, 6–7^{(5–7)}, 6–0	Acura Classic
2000	Manhattan Beach	(Belgium) Els Callens (Belgium) Dominique Monami Van Roost	(United States) Kimberly Po (France) Anne-Gaëlle Sidot	6–2, 7–5	estyle.com Classic
2001	Manhattan Beach	(United States) Kimberly Po-Messerli (France) Nathalie Tauziat (2)	(United States) Nicole Arendt (Netherlands) Caroline Vis	6–3, 7–5	estyle.com Classic
2002	Manhattan Beach	(Belgium) Kim Clijsters (Serbia and Montenegro) Jelena Dokić	(Slovakia) Daniela Hantuchová (Japan) Ai Sugiyama	6–2, 6–3	JPMorgan Chase Open
2003	Carson	(France) Mary Pierce (Australia) Rennae Stubbs	(Russia) Elena Bovina (Belgium) Els Callens	6–3, 6–3	JPMorgan Chase Open
2004	Carson	(Russia) Nadia Petrova (United States) Meghann Shaughnessy	(Spain) Conchita Martínez (Spain) Virginia Ruano Pascual	6–7^{(2–7)}, 6–4, 6–3	JPMorgan Chase Open
2005	Carson	(Russia) Elena Dementieva (Italy) Flavia Pennetta	(United States) Angela Haynes (United States) Bethanie Mattek	6–2, 6–4	JPMorgan Chase Open
2006	Carson	(Spain) Virginia Ruano Pascual (Argentina) Paola Suárez	(Slovakia) Daniela Hantuchová (Japan) Ai Sugiyama	6–3, 6–4	JPMorgan Chase Open
2007	Carson	(Czech Republic) Květa Hrdličková Peschke (Australia) Rennae Stubbs (2)	(Australia) Alicia Molik (Italy) Mara Santangelo	6–0, 6–1	East West Bank Classic
2008	Carson	(Chinese Taipei) Yung-jan Chan (Chinese Taipei) Chia-Jung Chuang	(Czech Republic) Eva Hrdinová (Czech Republic) Vladimíra Uhlířová	2–6, 7–5, (10-4)	East West Bank Classic
2009	Carson	(Chinese Taipei) Chia-Jung Chuang (2) (China) Yan Zi	(Russia) Maria Kirilenko (Poland) Agnieszka Radwańska	6–0, 4–6, 10–7	LA Women's Tennis Championships
2010	Succeeded by San Diego Open				

== See also ==
- Los Angeles Open
