= Carla Suárez Navarro career statistics =

Career finals
| Discipline | Type | Won | Lost | Total | WR |
|---|---|---|---|---|---|
| Singles | Grand Slam | – | – | – | – |
| Singles | Summer Olympics | – | – | – | – |
| Singles | WTA Finals (Note: Formerly known as: Virginia Slims Championships (until 1995); WTA Tour Championships (until 2014)) | – | – | – | – |
| Singles | WTA Elite (Note: Elite tier: WTA Tournament of Champions (2009–14); WTA Elite Trophy (2015–present)) | – | – | – | – |
| Singles | WTA 1000 (Note: Formerly known as: Category 4 & 5 & 6 (until 1990); Tier I (until 2009); WTA Premier Mandatory and 5 (until 2021)) | 1 | 2 | 3 | 0.33 |
| Singles | WTA 500 (Note: Formerly known as: Category 3 (until 1990); Tier II (until 2009); WTA Premier (until 2021)) | 0 | 2 | 2 | 0.00 |
| Singles | WTA 250 (Note: Formerly known as: Category 1 & 2 (until 1990); Tier III & IV & V (until 2009); WTA International (until 2021)) | 1 | 5 | 6 | 0.17 |
| Singles | Total | 2 | 9 | 11 | 0.18 |
| Doubles | Grand Slam | – | – | – | – |
| Doubles | Summer Olympics | – | – | – | – |
| Doubles | WTA Finals | 0 | 1 | 1 | 0.00 |
| Doubles | WTA Elite | – | – | – | – |
| Doubles | WTA 1000 | 0 | 4 | 4 | 0.00 |
| Doubles | WTA 500 | 3 | 1 | 4 | 0.75 |
| Doubles | WTA 250 | – | – | – | – |
| Doubles | Total | 3 | 6 | 9 | 0.33 |
| Total | | 5 | 15 | 20 | 0.25 |

This is a list of career statistics of Spanish professional tennis player Carla Suárez Navarro since her professional debut in 2003. Suárez Navarro has won two WTA singles titles and three doubles titles. Along with Garbiñe Muguruza, she also reached the final of the doubles tournament at the 2015 WTA Finals.

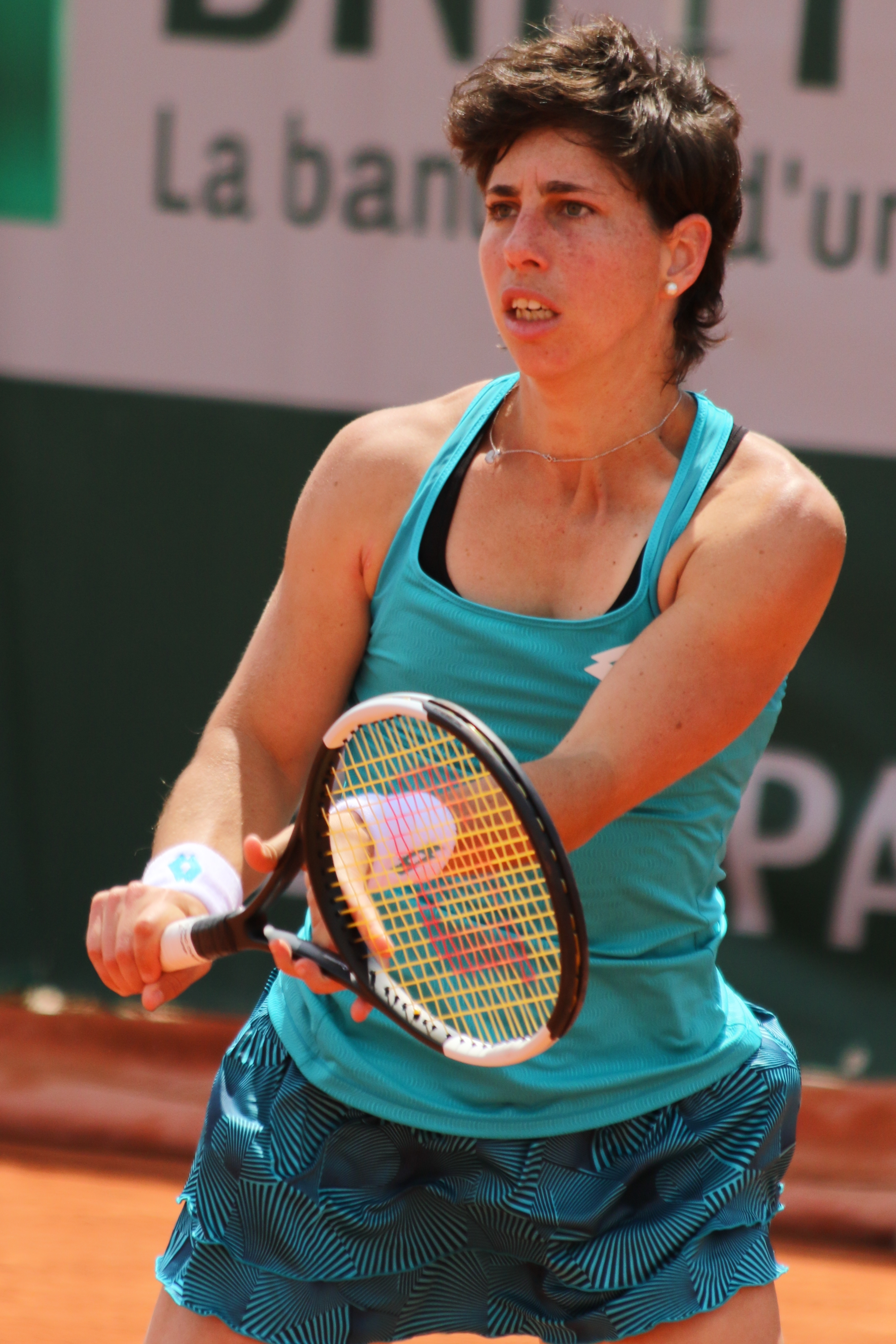
Suarez Navarro at the 2019 French Open

== Performance timelines ==
Key
| W | F | SF | QF | #R | RR | Q# | P# | DNQ | A | Z# | PO | G | S | B | NMS | NTI | P | NH |

(W) winner; (F) finalist; (SF) semifinalist; (QF) quarterfinalist; (#R) rounds 4, 3, 2, 1; (RR) round-robin stage; (Q#) qualification round; (P#) preliminary round; (DNQ) did not qualify; (A) absent; (Z#) Davis/Fed Cup Zonal Group (with number indication) or (PO) play-off; (G) gold, (S) silver or (B) bronze Olympic/Paralympic medal; (NMS) not a Masters tournament; (NTI) not a Tier I tournament; (P) postponed; (NH) not held; (SR) strike rate (events won / competed); (W–L) win–loss record.
To avoid confusion and double counting, these charts are updated at the conclusion of a tournament or when the player's participation has ended.

Only main-draw results in WTA Tour, Grand Slam tournaments, Billie Jean King Cup (Fed Cup), Hopman Cup and Olympic Games are included in win–loss records.

=== Singles ===
Current after 2020–21 Billie Jean King Cup Finals.

| Tournament | 2007 | 2008 | 2009 | 2010 | 2011 | 2012 | 2013 | 2014 | 2015 | 2016 | 2017 | 2018 | 2019 | 2020 | 2021 | SR | W–L | Win % |
|---|---|---|---|---|---|---|---|---|---|---|---|---|---|---|---|---|---|---|
Grand Slam tournaments
| Australian Open | A | Q2 | QF | 3R | 2R | 2R | 3R | 3R | 1R | QF | 2R | QF | 2R | 2R | A | 0 / 12 | 23–12 | 66% |
| French Open | A | QF | 3R | 1R | A | 3R | 4R | QF | 3R | 4R | 4R | 2R | 3R | A | 1R | 0 / 12 | 26–12 | 68% |
| Wimbledon | A | 2R | 3R | A | Q2 | 1R | 4R | 2R | 1R | 4R | 2R | 3R | 4R | NH | 1R | 0 / 11 | 16–11 | 59% |
| US Open | Q2 | 1R | 2R | 1R | 4R | 2R | QF | 3R | 1R | 4R | 4R | QF | 1R | A | 1R | 0 / 13 | 21–13 | 62% |
| Win–loss | 0–0 | 5–3 | 9–4 | 2–3 | 4–2 | 4–4 | 12–4 | 9–4 | 2–4 | 13–3 | 8–4 | 11–4 | 6–3 | 1–1 | 0–3 | 0 / 48 | 86–48 | 64% |
National representation
| Summer Olympics | NH | 1R | not held | | | 2R | not held | | | 3R | not held | | | | 2R | 0 / 4 | 4–5 | 44% |
Year-end championship
| WTA Elite Trophy | not held | | did not qualify | | | | | SF | RR | A | did not qualify | | | | | 0 / 2 | 3–2 | 60% |
WTA 1000
| Dubai / Qatar Open (Note: The first Premier 5 event of the year has switched back and forth between the Dubai Tennis Championships and the Qatar Total Open since 2009. Dubai was classified as a Premier 5 event from 2009 to 2011 before being succeeded by Doha for the 2012–2014 period. In 2015, Dubai regained its Premier 5 status while Doha was demoted to Premier status. The Premier 5 tournaments were reclassified as WTA 1000 tournaments in 2021.) | NT1 | A | A | A | A | 1R | 1R | A | QF | W | A | 2R | QF | 2R | A | 1 / 7 | 12–6 | 67% |
| Indian Wells Open | A | A | 2R | 4R | A | 2R | 3R | 3R | QF | A | 2R | QF | 2R | NH | A | 0 / 9 | 12–9 | 57% |
| Miami Open | A | A | 3R | 2R | A | 1R | 3R | 4R | F | 2R | 2R | 2R | 2R | NH | A | 0 / 10 | 10–9 | 53% |
| Madrid Open | not held | | 1R | A | A | 2R | 2R | 3R | QF | 3R | 3R | QF | 2R | NH | A | 0 / 9 | 12–9 | 57% |
| Italian Open | A | A | 2R | A | A | Q1 | QF | QF | F | 3R | 1R | 1R | 3R | A | A | 0 / 8 | 15–8 | 65% |
| Canadian Open | A | A | 1R | A | A | 3R | 2R | QF | 1R | 2R | 1R | 3R | 2R | NH | A | 0 / 9 | 9–9 | 50% |
| Cincinnati Open | NT1 | | 1R | A | Q1 | 1R | 1R | 3R | 1R | QF | 3R | 1R | 1R | A | A | 0 / 9 | 6–9 | 40% |
| Pan Pacific / Wuhan Open (Note: In 2014, the Toray Pan Pacific Open was downgraded to a Premier event and replaced by the Wuhan Open. The Premier 5 tournaments were reclassified as WTA 1000 tournaments in 2021.) | A | A | 1R | A | A | 1R | 1R | 2R | 3R | 3R | 1R | 1R | A | NH | | 0 / 8 | 4–8 | 33% |
| China Open | NT1 | | 1R | Q2 | 2R | QF | 3R | 3R | 3R | 1R | 1R | 2R | A | NH | | 0 / 9 | 11–9 | 55% |
Career statistics
| | 2007 | 2008 | 2009 | 2010 | 2011 | 2012 | 2013 | 2014 | 2015 | 2016 | 2017 | 2018 | 2019 | 2020 | 2021 | SR | W–L | Win % |
| Tournaments | 0 | 12 | 25 | 14 | 12 | 25 | 25 | 25 | 25 | 22 | 23 | 20 | 18 | 3 | 4 | Career total: 253 | | |
| Titles | 0 | 0 | 0 | 0 | 0 | 0 | 0 | 1 | 0 | 1 | 0 | 0 | 0 | 0 | 0 | Career total: 2 | | |
| Finals | 0 | 0 | 1 | 1 | 0 | 1 | 2 | 1 | 3 | 1 | 0 | 1 | 0 | 0 | 0 | Career total: 11 | | |
| Overall win–loss | 0–0 | 14–14 | 29–27 | 22–14 | 16–13 | 25–26 | 43–26 | 51–25 | 41–24 | 39–21 | 26–23 | 27–21 | 18–18 | 4–3 | 1–5 | 2 / 253 | 356–260 | 58% |
| Year-end ranking | 169 | 50 | 34 | 57 | 56 | 34 | 17 | 18 | 13 | 12 | 40 | 23 | 55 | 84 | | $11,699,196 | | |

=== Doubles ===
| Tournament | 2008 | 2009 | 2010 | 2011 | 2012 | 2013 | 2014 | 2015 | 2016 | ... | 2019 | 2020 | 2021 | SR | W–L | Win % |
|---|---|---|---|---|---|---|---|---|---|---|---|---|---|---|---|---|
Grand Slam tournaments
| Australian Open | A | 1R | 1R | 1R | 2R | QF | A | 2R | A | | A | A | A | 0 / 6 | 5–6 | 45% |
| French Open | A | 1R | absent | | 1R | 1R | SF | 1R | A | | A | A | A | 0 / 5 | 4–5 | 44% |
| Wimbledon | 1R | 2R | absent | | 2R | 3R | 3R | 2R | A | | A | NH | A | 0 / 6 | 6–6 | 50% |
| US Open | 1R | 2R | A | 1R | 2R | 1R | 3R | 2R | A | | A | A | 1R | 0 / 8 | 5–8 | 46% |
| Win–loss | 0–2 | 2–4 | 0–1 | 0–2 | 3–4 | 4–4 | 8–3 | 3–4 | 0–0 | | 0–0 | 0–0 | 0–1 | 0 / 25 | 20–25 | 45% |
WTA 1000
| Dubai / Qatar Open | A | A | A | A | A | 1R | A | F | F | | A | A | A | 0 / 3 | 6–3 | 67% |
| Indian Wells Open | A | A | A | A | A | A | A | 2R | 1R | | 2R | NH | A | 0 / 3 | 2–2 | 50% |
| Miami Open | A | A | A | A | A | A | QF | 2R | 2R | | A | NH | A | 0 / 3 | 4–3 | 57% |
| Madrid Open | A | A | A | A | 1R | SF | F | F | 2R | | A | NH | A | 0 / 5 | 12–5 | 71% |
| Canadian Open | A | A | A | A | A | A | 2R | 2R | A | | A | NH | A | 0 / 2 | 2–2 | 50% |
| Cincinnati Open | A | A | A | A | A | A | QF | 1R | QF | | A | A | A | 0 / 3 | 4–3 | 57% |
| Pan Pacific / Wuhan Open | A | A | A | A | A | A | 2R | QF | A | | A | NH | | 0 / 2 | 3–0 | 82% |
| China Open | not held | | A | A | A | 2R | QF | A | A | | A | NH | | 0 / 2 | 2–2 | 50% |
Career statistics
| Year-end ranking | 567 | 118 | 1014 | 1123 | 132 | 58 | 20 | 13 | 75 | | 1207 | 1269 | | | | |

== Significant finals ==
=== WTA Finals ===
==== Doubles: 1 (1 runner-up) ====
| Result | Year | Tournament | Surface | Partner | Opponents | Score |
|---|---|---|---|---|---|---|
| Loss | 2015 | WTA Finals, Singapore | Hard (i) | (Spain) Garbiñe Muguruza | (Switzerland) Martina Hingis; (India) Sania Mirza | 0–6, 3–6 |

=== WTA 1000 ===
==== Singles: 3 (1 title, 2 runners-up) ====
| Result | Year | Tournament | Surface | Opponent | Score |
|---|---|---|---|---|---|
| Loss | 2015 | Miami Open | Hard | (United States) Serena Williams | 2–6, 0–6 |
| Loss | 2015 | Italian Open | Clay | (Russia) Maria Sharapova | 6–4, 5–7, 1–6 |
| Win | 2016 | Qatar Open | Hard | (Latvia) Jeļena Ostapenko | 1–6, 6–4, 6–4 |

==== Doubles: 4 (4 runners-up) ====
| Result | Year | Tournament | Surface | Partner | Opponents | Score |
|---|---|---|---|---|---|---|
| Loss | 2014 | Madrid Open | Clay | (Spain) Garbiñe Muguruza | (Italy) Sara Errani; (Italy) Roberta Vinci | 4–6, 3–6 |
| Loss | 2015 | Dubai Championships | Hard | (Spain) Garbiñe Muguruza | (Hungary) Tímea Babos; (France) Kristina Mladenovic | 3–6, 2–6 |
| Loss | 2015 | Madrid Open | Clay | (Spain) Garbiñe Muguruza | (Australia) Casey Dellacqua; (Kazakhstan) Yaroslava Shvedova | 3–6, 7–6^{(7–4)}, [5–10] |
| Loss | 2016 | Qatar Open | Hard | (Italy) Sara Errani | (Chinese Taipei) Chan Hao-ching; (Chinese Taipei) Chan Yung-jan | 3–6, 3–6 |

== WTA Tour finals ==
=== Singles: 11 (2 titles, 9 runners-up) ===
| Legend WTA 1000 (Premier 5 / Premier M) (1–2) WTA 500 (Premier) (0–2) WTA 250 (International) (1–5) | Surface Hard (1–3) Clay (1–6) |

| Result | W–L | Date | Tournament | Tier | Surface | Opponent | Score |
|---|---|---|---|---|---|---|---|
| Loss | 0–1 | Apr 2009 | Andalucia Experience, Spain | International | Clay | (Serbia) Jelena Janković | 3–6, 6–3, 3–6 |
| Loss | 0–2 | Apr 2010 | Andalucia Experience, Spain | International | Clay | (Italy) Flavia Pennetta | 2–6, 6–4, 3–6 |
| Loss | 0–3 | May 2012 | Portugal Open | International | Clay | (Estonia) Kaia Kanepi | 6–3, 6–7^{(6–8)},4–6 |
| Loss | 0–4 | Mar 2013 | Mexican Open | International | Clay | (Italy) Sara Errani | 0–6, 4–6 |
| Loss | 0–5 | May 2013 | Portugal Open | International | Clay | (Russia) Anastasia Pavlyuchenkova | 5–7, 2–6 |
| Win | 1–5 | May 2014 | Portugal Open | International | Clay | (Russia) Svetlana Kuznetsova | 6–4, 3–6, 6–4 |
| Loss | 1–6 | Feb 2015 | Diamond Games, Belgium | Premier | Hard | (Germany) Andrea Petkovic | walkover |
| Loss | 1–7 | Apr 2015 | Miami Open, United States | Premier M | Hard | (United States) Serena Williams | 2–6, 0–6 |
| Loss | 1–8 | May 2015 | Italian Open | Premier 5 | Clay | (Russia) Maria Sharapova | 6–4, 5–7, 1–6 |
| Win | 2–8 | Feb 2016 | Qatar Open | Premier 5 | Hard | (Latvia) Jeļena Ostapenko | 1–6, 6–4, 6–4 |
| Loss | 2–9 | Aug 2018 | Connecticut Open, United States | Premier | Hard | (Belarus) Aryna Sabalenka | 1–6, 4–6 |

=== Doubles: 9 (3 titles, 6 runners-up) ===
Legend
Finals (0–1)
WTA 1000 (Premier 5 / Premier M) (0–4)
WTA 500 (Premier) (3–1)

| Result | W–L | Date | Tournament | Tier | Surface | Partner | Opponents | Score |
|---|---|---|---|---|---|---|---|---|
| Loss | 0–1 | May 2014 | Madrid Open, Spain | Premier M | Clay | (Spain) Garbiñe Muguruza | (Italy) Sara Errani; (Italy) Roberta Vinci | 4–6, 3–6 |
| Win | 1–1 | Aug 2014 | Bank of the West Classic, U.S. | Premier | Hard | (Spain) Garbiñe Muguruza | (Poland) Paula Kania (Czech Republic) Kateřina Siniaková | 6–2, 4–6, [10–5] |
| Loss | 1–2 | Sep 2014 | Pan Pacific Open, Japan | Premier | Hard | (Spain) Garbiñe Muguruza | (Zimbabwe) Cara Black (India) Sania Mirza | 2–6, 5–7 |
| Loss | 1–3 | Feb 2015 | Dubai Championships, UAE | Premier 5 | Hard | (Spain) Garbiñe Muguruza | (Hungary) Tímea Babos; (France) Kristina Mladenovic | 3–6, 2–6 |
| Loss | 1–4 | May 2015 | Madrid Open, Spain | Premier M | Clay | (Spain) Garbiñe Muguruza | (Australia) Casey Dellacqua (Kazakhstan) Yaroslava Shvedova | 3–6, 7–6^{(7–4)}, [5–10] |
| Win | 2–4 | Jun 2015 | Birmingham Classic, United Kingdom | Premier | Grass | (Spain) Garbiñe Muguruza | (Czech Republic) Andrea Hlaváčková (Czech Republic) Lucie Hradecká | 6–4, 6–4 |
| Win | 3–4 | Sep 2015 | Pan Pacific Open, Japan | Premier | Hard | (Spain) Garbiñe Muguruza | (Chinese Taipei) Yung-jan Chan (Chinese Taipei) Hao-Ching Chan | 7–5, 6–1 |
| Loss | 3–5 | Nov 2015 | WTA Finals, Singapore | Finals | Hard | (Spain) Garbiñe Muguruza | (Switzerland) Martina Hingis (India) Sania Mirza | 0–6, 3–6 |
| Loss | 3–6 | Feb 2016 | Qatar Open | Premier 5 | Hard | (Italy) Sara Errani | (Chinese Taipei) Chan Hao-ching; (Chinese Taipei) Chan Yung-jan | 3–6, 3–6 |

== ITF Circuit finals ==
=== Singles: 11 (6 titles, 5 runner-ups) ===
Legend
$100,000 tournaments
$25,000 tournaments
$10,000 tournaments

| Result | W–L | Date | Tournament | Tier | Surface | Opponent | Score |
|---|---|---|---|---|---|---|---|
| Win | 1–0 | Nov 2004 | Mallorca, Spain | 10,000 | Clay | (Czech Republic) Petra Novotnikova | 6–2, 3–6, 6–1 |
| Win | 2–0 | Mar 2005 | Gran Canaria, Spain | 10,000 | Hard | (Czech Republic) Petra Cetkovská | 2–6, 6–4, 6–3 |
| Loss | 2–1 | May 2005 | Tenerife, Spain | 25,000 | Hard | (Czech Republic) Petra Cetkovská | 7–6^{(0)}, 3–6, 1–6 |
| Loss | 2–2 | Sep 2005 | Vittoria, Italy | 10,000 | Clay | (Italy) Anna Floris | 4–6, 5–7 |
| Win | 3–2 | Feb 2006 | Algarve, Portugal | 10,000 | Hard | (Turkey) İpek Şenoğlu | 6–2, 6–3 |
| Loss | 3–3 | Jan 2007 | Sunderland, United Kingdom | 10,000 | Hard (i) | (United Kingdom) Karen Paterson | 4–6, 2–6 |
| Win | 4–3 | Feb 2007 | Melilla, Spain | 10,000 | Hard | (Greece) Anna Gerasimou | 6–4, 6–4 |
| Win | 5–3 | May 2007 | Gran Canaria, Spain | 10,000 | Clay | (Italy) Anna Floris | 6–2, 6–2 |
| Win | 6–3 | Jun 2007 | Madrid, Spain | 25,000 | Clay | (Russia) Alina Jidkova | 6–2, 6–1 |
| Loss | 6–4 | Mar 2008 | Tenerife, Spain | 25,000 | Hard | (Israel) Tzipora Obziler | 2–6, 3–6 |
| Loss | 6–5 | Sep 2010 | Sofia, Bulgaria | 100,000 | Clay | (France) Mathilde Johansson | 4–6, 1–3 ret. |

=== Doubles: 7 (4 titles, 3 runner-ups) ===
Legend
$75,000 tournaments
$50,000 tournaments
$25,000 tournaments
$10,000 tournaments

| Result | W–L | Date | Tournament | Tier | Surface | Partner | Opponents | Score |
|---|---|---|---|---|---|---|---|---|
| Win | 1–0 | Jul 2004 | Getxo, Spain | 10,000 | Clay | (Spain) Anna Font | (Argentina) Andrea Benítez (Uruguay) Estefanía Craciún | 6–2, 6–3 |
| Win | 2–0 | Sep 2005 | Vittoria, Italy | 10,000 | Clay | (United States) Lauren Fisher | (Italy) Silvia Disderi (Italy) Giorgia Mortello | 6–2, 6–3 |
| Loss | 2–1 | April 2006 | Torrent, Spain | 25,000 | Clay | (Spain) Sílvia Soler Espinosa | (Russia) Ekaterina Makarova (Spain) Gabriela Velasco Andreu | 4–6, 2–6 |
| Loss | 2–2 | April 2007 | Torrent, Spain | 50,000 | Clay | (Spain) Marta Marrero | (Russia) Ekaterina Lopes (Russia) Evgeniya Rodina | 6–7^{(7)}, 6–3, 2–6 |
| Loss | 2–3 | Apr 2007 | Gran Canaria, Spain | 25,000 | Clay | (Spain) Marta Marrero | (United Kingdom) Anne Keothavong (Portugal) Frederica Piedade | w/o |
| Win | 3–3 | Jul 2007 | Pétange, Luxembourg | 75,000 | Clay | (Belarus) Anastasiya Yakimova | (Germany) Martina Müller; (Luxembourg) Claudine Schaul | 6–7, 6–1, 7–6 |
| Win | 4–3 | Aug 2007 | Vigo, Spain | 25,000 | Hard | (Spain) Estrella Cabeza Candela | (Germany) Ria Sabay (Germany) Justine Ozga | 6–1, 4–6, 6–3 |

== WTA Tour career earnings ==
Current as of 3 November 2021

| Year | Grand Slam titles (Note: Includes singles, doubles and mixed doubles titles.) | WTA titles | Total titles | Earnings ($) | Money list rank |
| 2010 | 0 | 0 | 0 | 195,486 | 94 |
| 2011 | 0 | 0 | 0 | 234,460 | 83 |
| 2012 | 0 | 0 | 0 | 433,000 | 48 |
| 2013 | 0 | 0 | 0 | 1,144,000 | 21 |
| 2014 | 0 | 1 | 1 | 1,418,777 | 20 |
| 2015 | 0 | 0 | 0 | 2,001,705 | 11 |
| 2016 | 0 | 1 | 1 | 1,986,117 | 14 |
| 2017 | 0 | 0 | 0 | 877,091 | 41 |
| 2018 | 0 | 0 | 0 | 1,645,782 | 24 |
| 2019 | 0 | 0 | 0 | 816,963 | 48 |
| 2020 | 0 | 0 | 0 | 118,310 | 167 |
| 2021 | 0 | 0 | 0 | 220,920 |
| Career | 0 | 2 | 2 | 11,920,116 | 43 |

== Grand Slam tournament seedings ==
| Year | Australian Open | French Open | Wimbledon | US Open |
|---|---|---|---|---|
| 2007 | did not qualify | unseeded | unseeded | did not qualify |
| 2008 | unseeded | unseeded | unseeded | unseeded |
| 2009 | unseeded | 22nd | unseeded | unseeded |
| 2010 | 32nd | unseeded | absent | unseeded |
| 2011 | unseeded | absent | did not qualify | unseeded |
| 2012 | unseeded | unseeded | unseeded | unseeded |
| 2013 | unseeded | 20th | 19th | 18th |
| 2014 | 16th | 14th | 15th | 15th |
| 2015 | 17th | 8th | 9th | 10th |
| 2016 | 10th | 12th | 12th | 11th |
| 2017 | 10th | 21st | 25th | unseeded |
| 2018 | unseeded | 23rd | 27th | 30th |
| 2019 | 23rd | 28th | 30th | 28th |
| 2020 | unseeded | absent | not held | absent |
| 2021 | absent | unseeded | unseeded | unseeded |

== Top 10 wins ==
| Season | 2009 | 2010 | 2011 | 2012 | 2013 | 2014 | 2015 | 2016 | 2017 | 2018 | Total |
|---|---|---|---|---|---|---|---|---|---|---|---|
| Wins | 1 | 1 | 0 | 2 | 4 | 3 | 9 | 4 | 0 | 4 | 28 |

| # | Player | vsRank | Event | Surface | Round | Score |
|---|---|---|---|---|---|---|
2009
| 1. | (United States) Venus Williams | 6 | Australian Open | Hard | 2R | 2–6, 6–3, 7–5 |
2010
| 2. | (Russia) Svetlana Kuznetsova | 3 | Indian Wells, United States | Hard | 2R | 6–4, 4–6, 6–1 |
2012
| 3. | (Australia) Samantha Stosur | 5 | London Olympics, UK | Grass | 1R | 3–6, 7–5, 10–8 |
| 4. | (Czech Republic) Petra Kvitová | 5 | China Open | Hard | 2R | 6–3, 6–2 |
2013
| 5. | (Italy) Sara Errani | 7 | Australian Open | Hard | 1R | 6–4, 6–4 |
| 6. | (Denmark) Caroline Wozniacki | 10 | Stuttgart Open, Germany | Clay (i) | 1R | 7–6^{(8–6)}, 6–1 |
| 7. | (Australia) Samantha Stosur | 9 | Madrid Open, Spain | Clay | 1R | 7–6^{(9–7)}, 6–2 |
| 8. | (Germany) Angelique Kerber | 10 | US Open | Hard | 4R | 4–6, 6–3, 7–6^{(7–3)} |
2014
| 9. | (Czech Republic) Petra Kvitová | 6 | Dubai Championships, UAE | Hard | 2R | 1–6, 6–4, 7–6^{(7–4)} |
| 10. | (Germany) Angelique Kerber | 7 | Stuttgart Open, Germany | Clay (i) | 2R | 7–5, 6–4 |
| 11. | (Russia) Maria Sharapova | 6 | Canadian Open | Hard | 3R | 6–2, 4–6, 6–2 |
2015
| 12. | (Russia) Ekaterina Makarova | 10 | Sydney International, Australia | Hard | 2R | 4–6, 6–4, 6–1 |
| 13. | (Czech Republic) Petra Kvitová | 3 | Dubai Championships, UAE | Hard | 3R | 6–3, 4–6, 6–3 |
| 14. | (Czech Republic) Petra Kvitová | 4 | Qatar Open | Hard | QF | 3–6, 6–0, 6–3 |
| 15. | (Poland) Agnieszka Radwańska | 8 | Miami Open, United States | Hard | 4R | 5–7, 6–0, 6–4 |
| 16. | (Germany) Andrea Petkovic | 10 | Miami Open, United States | Hard | SF | 6–3, 6–3 |
| 17. | (Serbia) Ana Ivanovic | 7 | Madrid Open, Spain | Clay | 3R | 7–5, 1–6, 6–4 |
| 18. | (Canada) Eugenie Bouchard | 6 | Italian Open | Clay | 3R | 6–7^{(2–7)}, 7–5, 7–6^{(9–7)} |
| 19. | (Czech Republic) Petra Kvitová | 4 | Italian Open | Clay | QF | 6–3, 6–2 |
| 20. | (Romania) Simona Halep | 2 | Italian Open | Clay | SF | 2–6, 6–3, 7–5 |
2016
| 21. | (Poland) Agnieszka Radwańska | 3 | Qatar Open | Hard | SF | 6–2, 6–0 |
| 22. | (Italy) Roberta Vinci | 8 | Fed Cup, Spain | Clay | WG PO | 6–1, 6–1 |
| 23. | (Germany) Angelique Kerber | 4 | Birmingham Classic, UK | Grass | QF | 6–4, 1–6, 7–5 |
| 24. | (Italy) Roberta Vinci | 8 | Cincinnati Open, United States | Hard | 3R | 6–1, 7–5 |
2018
| 25. | (Ukraine) Elina Svitolina | 4 | Indian Wells Open, United States | Hard | 3R | 7–5, 6–3 |
| 26. | (Ukraine) Elina Svitolina | 4 | Madrid Open, Spain | Clay | 2R | 2–6, 7–6^{(7–3)}, 6–4 |
| 27. | (Czech Republic) Petra Kvitová | 5 | Connecticut Open, United States | Hard | QF | 6–3, ret. |
| 28. | (France) Caroline Garcia | 6 | US Open | Hard | 3R | 5–7, 6–4, 7–6^{(7–4)} |
