= 2015 Mutua Madrid Open – Men's singles =

Men's singles
- 2015 Mutua Madrid Open

Final
- Champion: (United Kingdom) Andy Murray
- Runner-up: (Spain) Rafael Nadal
- Score: 6–3, 6–2

Events
Singles	men	women
Doubles	men	women
- Mutua Madrid Open

Andy Murray defeated the two-time defending champion Rafael Nadal in the final, 6–3, 6–2 to win the men's singles tennis title at the 2015 Madrid Open. It was his second title in as many weeks. Murray became the third, and last, man to beat Nadal on clay in a Masters 1000 final, after Roger Federer and Novak Djokovic.

== Seeds ==
The top eight seeds receive a bye into the second round.

1. (Switzerland) Roger Federer (second round)
2. (United Kingdom) Andy Murray (champion)
3. (Spain) Rafael Nadal (final)
4. (Japan) Kei Nishikori (semifinals)
5. (Canada) Milos Raonic (quarterfinals)
6. (Czech Republic) Tomáš Berdych (semifinals)
7. (Spain) David Ferrer (quarterfinals)
8. (Switzerland) Stan Wawrinka (third round)

9. (Croatia) Marin Čilić (second round)
10. (Bulgaria) Grigor Dimitrov (quarterfinals)
11. (Spain) Feliciano López (second round)
12. (France) Jo-Wilfried Tsonga (third round)
13. (France) Gaël Monfils (second round)
14. (Spain) Roberto Bautista Agut (third round)
15. (South Africa) Kevin Anderson (first round)
16. (United States) John Isner (quarterfinals)

Click on the seed number of a player to go to their draw section.

== Draw ==
Key

- Q = Qualifier
- WC = Wild card
- LL = Lucky loser
- Alt = Alternate
- ITF = ITF entry
- PR = Protected ranking
- SR = Special ranking
- SE = Special exempt
- JE = Junior exempt
- JR = Junior Accelerator Programme entrant
- CO = College Accelerator Programme entrant
- NG = Next Gen Accelerator Program entrant
- w/o = Walkover
- r = Retired
- d = Defaulted

=== Finals ===
Quarterfinals
16	(United States) John Isner	6	6^{7}	6^{1}
6	(Czech Republic) Tomáš Berdych	3	7^{9}	7^{7}
3	(Spain) Rafael Nadal	6	6
10	(Bulgaria) Grigor Dimitrov	3	4
7	(Spain) David Ferrer	4	2
4	(Japan) Kei Nishikori	6	6
5	(Canada) Milos Raonic	4	5
2	(United Kingdom) Andy Murray	6	7

Semifinals
6	(Czech Republic) Tomáš Berdych	6^{3}	1
3	(Spain) Rafael Nadal	7^{7}	6
4	(Japan) Kei Nishikori	3	4
2	(United Kingdom) Andy Murray	6	6

Final
3	(Spain) Rafael Nadal	3	2
2	(United Kingdom) Andy Murray	6	6

=== Top half ===
==== Section 1 ====
First round
Q	(Spain) D Gimeno Traver	2	3
(Australia) N Kyrgios	6	6
(France) J Chardy	4	5
Q	(Brazil) T Bellucci	6	7
(France) A Mannarino	6^{2}	4
16	(United States) J Isner	7^{7}	6
12	(France) J-W Tsonga	7	6
(Czech Republic) L Rosol	5	3
WC	(Spain) P Andújar	4	5
(United States) J Sock	6	7
(Croatia) I Karlović	3	4
(France) R Gasquet	6	6

Second round
1	(Switzerland) R Federer	7^{7}	6^{5}	6^{12}
(Australia) N Kyrgios	6^{2}	7^{7}	7^{14}
Q	(Brazil) T Bellucci	6^{5}	7^{13}	1
16	(United States) J Isner	7^{7}	6^{11}	6
12	(France) J-W Tsonga	6	1	7^{7}
(United States) J Sock	3	6	6^{4}
(France) R Gasquet	6^{3}	5
6	(Czech Republic) T Berdych	7^{7}	7

Third round
(Australia) N Kyrgios	3	7^{9}	4
16	(United States) J Isner	6	6^{7}	6
12	(France) J-W Tsonga	5	2
6	(Czech Republic) T Berdych	7	6

Quarterfinals
16	(United States) J Isner	6	6^{7}	6^{1}
6	(Czech Republic) T Berdych	3	7^{9}	7^{7}

==== Section 2 ====
First round
Q	(Colombia) A González	6	3	6^{4}
(United States) S Johnson	4	6	7^{7}
(Australia) B Tomic	6	4	6^{1}
Q	(Italy) L Vanni	3	6	7^{7}
(Italy) S Bolelli	6	6
15	(South Africa) K Anderson	4	3
10	(Bulgaria) G Dimitrov	6	3
(United States) D Young	4	0^{r}
(Italy) F Fognini	6	6
(Colombia) S Giraldo	2	3
(Poland) J Janowicz	4	5
LL	(Portugal) J Sousa	6	7

Second round
3	(Spain) R Nadal	6	6
(United States) S Johnson	4	3
Q	(Italy) L Vanni	6	3	2
(Italy) S Bolelli	4	6	6
10	(Bulgaria) G Dimitrov	3	6	7
(Italy) F Fognini	6	2	5
LL	(Portugal) J Sousa	6^{1}	5
8	(Switzerland) S Wawrinka	7^{7}	7

Third round
3	(Spain) R Nadal	6	6
(Italy) S Bolelli	2	2
10	(Bulgaria) G Dimitrov	7^{7}	3	6
8	(Switzerland) S Wawrinka	6^{5}	6	3

Quarterfinals
3	(Spain) R Nadal	6	6
10	(Bulgaria) G Dimitrov	3	4

=== Bottom half ===
==== Section 3 ====
First round
(Uruguay) P Cuevas	6	3	4
Q	(Spain) A Ramos Viñolas	3	6	6
(Spain) F Verdasco	4	6	6
(Spain) G García López	6	2	3
(Czech Republic) J Veselý	5	1
9	(Croatia) M Čilić	7	6
14	(Spain) R Bautista Agut	7	6
WC	(Romania) M Copil	5	3
(United States) S Querrey	6	6^{6}	6
Q	(Australia) T Kokkinakis	4	7^{8}	3
(Latvia) E Gulbis	6	1	5
(Belgium) D Goffin	3	6	7

Second round
7	(Spain) D Ferrer	6	6
Q	(Spain) A Ramos Viñolas	4	0
(Spain) F Verdasco	6^{5}	7^{7}	6
9	(Croatia) M Čilić	7^{7}	6^{5}	3
14	(Spain) R Bautista Agut	7	6
(United States) S Querrey	5	4
(Belgium) D Goffin	2	6	4
4	(Japan) K Nishikori	6	4	6

Third round
7	(Spain) D Ferrer	5	6	6
(Spain) F Verdasco	7	3	4
14	(Spain) R Bautista Agut	3	3
4	(Japan) K Nishikori	6	6

Quarterfinals
7	(Spain) D Ferrer	4	2
4	(Japan) K Nishikori	6	6

==== Section 4 ====
First round
(Argentina) J Mónaco	6	6
WC	(Spain) N Almagro	3	2
(Argentina) L Mayer	6	6
(Luxembourg) G Müller	3	3
(Germany) B Becker	5	6	4
11	(Spain) F López	7	3	6
13	(France) G Monfils	6	6
(Serbia) V Troicki	2	0
(Slovakia) M Kližan	2^{r}
WC	(Spain) M Granollers	5
Q	(Colombia) A Falla	1	4
(Germany) P Kohlschreiber	6	6

Second round
5	(Canada) M Raonic	6	6
(Argentina) J Mónaco	3	4
(Argentina) L Mayer	7^{7}	7^{8}
11	(Spain) F López	6^{3}	6^{6}
13	(France) G Monfils	6^{6}	7^{9}	4
WC	(Spain) M Granollers	7^{8}	6^{7}	6
(Germany) P Kohlschreiber	4	6	0
2	(United Kingdom) A Murray	6	3	6

Third round
5	(Canada) M Raonic	6	6
(Argentina) L Mayer	4	3
WC	(Spain) M Granollers	2	0
2	(United Kingdom) A Murray	6	6

Quarterfinals
5	(Canada) M Raonic	4	5
2	(United Kingdom) A Murray	6	7

== Qualifying ==
=== Seeds ===
1. (Ukraine) Sergiy Stakhovsky (first round)
2. (Portugal) João Sousa (qualifying competition, lucky loser)
3. (Canada) Vasek Pospisil (first round)
4. (Spain) Daniel Gimeno Traver (qualified)
5. (Argentina) Carlos Berlocq (first round, retired)
6. (Spain) Albert Ramos Viñolas (qualified)
7. (Argentina) Federico Delbonis (qualifying competition)
8. (Brazil) Thomaz Bellucci (qualified)
9. (Brazil) João Souza (first round)
10. (Turkey) Marsel İlhan (qualifying competition)
11. (Lithuania) Ričardas Berankis (qualifying competition)
12. (Australia) Thanasi Kokkinakis (qualified)
13. (United Kingdom) James Ward (first round)
14. (Colombia) Alejandro González (qualified)

=== Qualifiers ===
1. (Colombia) Alejandro Falla
2. (Colombia) Alejandro González
3. (Australia) Thanasi Kokkinakis
4. (Spain) Daniel Gimeno Traver
5. (Italy) Luca Vanni
6. (Spain) Albert Ramos Viñolas
7. (Brazil) Thomaz Bellucci

=== Lucky loser ===
1. (Portugal) João Sousa

=== Qualifying draw ===
==== First qualifier ====
First round
1	(Ukraine) Sergiy Stakhovsky	3	2
(Colombia) Alejandro Falla	6	6
WC	(Spain) Roberto Carballés Baena	6	6
13	(United Kingdom) James Ward	2	4

Qualifying competition
(Colombia) Alejandro Falla	6	7^{7}
WC	(Spain) Roberto Carballés Baena	1	6^{1}

==== Second qualifier ====
First round
2	(Portugal) João Sousa	4	6	6
(France) Édouard Roger-Vasselin	6	3	3
(France) Kenny de Schepper	6	6^{4}	6^{2}
14	(Colombia) Alejandro González	3	7^{7}	7^{7}

Qualifying competition
2	(Portugal) João Sousa	6	5	2
14	(Colombia) Alejandro González	2	7	6

==== Third qualifier ====
First round
3	(Canada) Vasek Pospisil	2	4
WC	(Serbia) Janko Tipsarević	6	6
(Italy) Matteo Viola	2	1
12	(Australia) Thanasi Kokkinakis	6	6

Qualifying competition
WC	(Serbia) Janko Tipsarević	3	6	6^{4}
12	(Australia) Thanasi Kokkinakis	6	4	7^{7}

==== Fourth qualifier ====
First round
4	(Spain) Daniel Gimeno Traver	6	6
WC	(Spain) Javier Martí	3	1
WC	(Spain) Roberto Ortega Olmedo	3	5
10	(Turkey) Marsel İlhan	6	7

Qualifying competition
4	(Spain) Daniel Gimeno Traver	6	6
10	(Turkey) Marsel İlhan	2	3

==== Fifth qualifier ====
First round
5	(Argentina) Carlos Berlocq	5^{r}
(Italy) Luca Vanni	5
(France) Nicolas Mahut	7^{7}	6
9	(Brazil) João Souza	6^{4}	4

Qualifying competition
(Italy) Luca Vanni	6	3	7
(France) Nicolas Mahut	4	6	5

==== Sixth qualifier ====
First round
6	(Spain) Albert Ramos Viñolas	6^{2}	6	3
(Croatia) Ivan Dodig	7^{7}	4	0^{r}
(Germany) Tobias Kamke	6^{6}	1
11	(Lithuania) Ričardas Berankis	7^{8}	6

Qualifying competition
6	(Spain) Albert Ramos Viñolas	6	6
11	(Lithuania) Ričardas Berankis	3	3

==== Seventh qualifier ====
First round
7	(Argentina) Federico Delbonis	6	6
(Czech Republic) Jaroslav Pospíšil	1	4
(Germany) Michael Berrer	3	2
8	(Brazil) Thomaz Bellucci	6	6

Qualifying competition
7	(Argentina) Federico Delbonis	6	6^{1}	6^{3}
8	(Brazil) Thomaz Bellucci	4	7^{7}	7^{7}
