= 2015 Mutua Madrid Open – Women's singles =

Women's singles
- 2015 Mutua Madrid Open

Final
- Champion: (Czech Republic) Petra Kvitová
- Runner-up: (Russia) Svetlana Kuznetsova
- Score: 6–1, 6–2

Events
Singles	men	women
Doubles	men	women
← 2014 ·	Mutua Madrid Open	· 2016 →

Petra Kvitová defeated Svetlana Kuznetsova in the final, 6–1, 6–2 to win the women's singles tennis title at the 2015 Madrid Open. It was her second Madrid Open title.

Maria Sharapova was the defending champion, but lost to Kuznetsova in the semifinals.

== Seeds ==
1. (United States) Serena Williams (semifinals)
2. (Romania) Simona Halep (first round)
3. (Russia) Maria Sharapova (semifinals)
4. (Czech Republic) Petra Kvitová (champion)
5. (Denmark) Caroline Wozniacki (quarterfinals)
6. (Canada) Eugenie Bouchard (first round)
7. (Serbia) Ana Ivanovic (third round)
8. (Russia) Ekaterina Makarova (first round)

9. (Poland) Agnieszka Radwańska (third round)
10. (Spain) Carla Suárez Navarro (quarterfinals)
11. (Germany) Andrea Petkovic (second round, withdrew)
12. (Germany) Angelique Kerber (first round)
13. (Czech Republic) Lucie Šafářová (quarterfinals)
14. (Czech Republic) Karolína Plíšková (second round)
15. (Italy) Sara Errani (second round)
16. (United States) Venus Williams (first round)

Click on the seed number of a player to go to their draw section.

== Draw ==
=== Key ===
- Q = Qualifier
- WC = Wild card
- LL = Lucky loser
- Alt = Alternate
- SE = Special exempt
- PR = Protected ranking
- ITF = ITF entry
- JE = Junior exempt
- w/o = Walkover
- r = Retired
- d = Defaulted
- SR = Special ranking

=== Finals ===
Quarterfinals
1	(United States) Serena Williams	6	6
10	(Spain) Carla Suárez Navarro	1	3
4	(Czech Republic) Petra Kvitová	7	6
(Romania) Irina-Camelia Begu	5	3
5	(Denmark) Caroline Wozniacki	1	6	3
3	(Russia) Maria Sharapova	6	3	6
(Russia) Svetlana Kuznetsova	5	7^{7}	7^{7}
13	(Czech Republic) Lucie Šafářová	7	6^{5}	6^{3}

Semifinals
1	(United States) Serena Williams	2	3
4	(Czech Republic) Petra Kvitová	6	6
3	(Russia) Maria Sharapova	2	4
(Russia) Svetlana Kuznetsova	6	6

Final
4	(Czech Republic) Petra Kvitová	6	6
(Russia) Svetlana Kuznetsova	1	2

=== Top half ===
==== Section 1 ====
First round
1	(United States) S Williams	6	6
(United States) M Brengle	0	1
PR	(United States) B Mattek-Sands	6	1	4
(United States) S Stephens	3	6	6
(Croatia) A Tomljanović	6	6
(Switzerland) B Bencic	4	3
(Belarus) V Azarenka	6	7
16	(United States) V Williams	3	5
10	(Spain) C Suárez Navarro	6	6
(Kazakhstan) Z Diyas	4	4
Q	(New Zealand) M Erakovic	1	6	4
Q	(Germany) J Görges	6	0	6
(Ukraine) E Svitolina	6	6
(Slovakia) D Hantuchová	0	3
WC	(Romania) A Dulgheru	6	6^{1}	0^{r}
7	(Serbia) A Ivanovic	2	7^{7}	4

Second round
1	(United States) S Williams	6	6
(United States) S Stephens	4	0
(Croatia) A Tomljanović	3	3
(Belarus) V Azarenka	6	6
10	(Spain) C Suárez Navarro	6	7
Q	(Germany) J Görges	3	5
(Ukraine) E Svitolina	3	4
7	(Serbia) A Ivanovic	6	6

Third round
1	(United States) S Williams	7^{7}	3	7^{7}
(Belarus) V Azarenka	6^{5}	6	6^{1}
10	(Spain) C Suárez Navarro	7	1	6
7	(Serbia) A Ivanovic	5	6	4

Quarterfinals
1	(United States) S Williams	6	6
10	(Spain) C Suárez Navarro	1	3

==== Section 2 ====
First round
4	(Czech Republic) P Kvitová	3	6	6
Q	(Belarus) O Govortsova	6	1	4
(Germany) S Lisicki	6^{3}	6	5
(United States) C Vandeweghe	7^{7}	3	7
(China) S Peng	1	2
(Russia) A Pavlyuchenkova	6	6
Q	(Spain) P Badosa Gibert	0^{r}
15	(Italy) S Errani	3
11	(Germany) A Petkovic	6	7
(Italy) F Pennetta	3	5
(Romania) I-C Begu	7^{8}	6
(Japan) K Nara	6^{6}	1
Q	(Romania) A Mitu	6^{3}	4
(United States) V Lepchenko	7^{7}	6
(Czech Republic) B Strýcová	0	6	6
6	(Canada) E Bouchard	6	3	3

Second round
4	(Czech Republic) P Kvitová	6	2	6
(United States) C Vandeweghe	4	6	3
(Russia) A Pavlyuchenkova	3	7^{9}	6
15	(Italy) S Errani	6	6^{7}	4
11	(Germany) A Petkovic
(Romania) I-C Begu	w/o
(United States) V Lepchenko	4	2
(Czech Republic) B Strýcová	6	6

Third round
4	(Czech Republic) P Kvitová	6	6
(Russia) A Pavlyuchenkova	1	4
(Romania) I-C Begu	6	6
(Czech Republic) B Strýcová	4	4

Quarterfinals
4	(Czech Republic) P Kvitová	7	6
(Romania) I-C Begu	5	3

=== Bottom half ===
==== Section 3 ====
First round
5	(Denmark) C Wozniacki	6	6
(Australia) J Gajdošová	3	0
Q	(United States) C McHale	6	6
(Germany) M Barthel	3	2
(Australia) C Dellacqua	6	7^{7}
WC	(Italy) F Schiavone	4	6^{5}
WC	(Spain) L Arruabarrena	4	3
9	(Poland) A Radwańska	6	6
14	(Czech Republic) Ka Plíšková	6	6
WC	(Spain) S Soler Espinosa	1	2
(France) C Garcia	6	6
Q	(Croatia) M Lučić-Baroni	4	4
(United Kingdom) H Watson	6	3	6^{11}
Q	(Colombia) M Duque Mariño	0	6	7^{13}
(Switzerland) T Bacsinszky	2	3
3	(Russia) M Sharapova	6	6

Second round
5	(Denmark) C Wozniacki	7	6
Q	(United States) C McHale	5	0
(Australia) C Dellacqua	2	1
9	(Poland) A Radwańska	6	6
14	(Czech Republic) Ka Plíšková	2	6	1
(France) C Garcia	6	4	6
Q	(Colombia) M Duque Mariño	1	2
3	(Russia) M Sharapova	6	6

Third round
5	(Denmark) C Wozniacki	6	6
9	(Poland) A Radwańska	3	2
(France) C Garcia	2	6	5
3	(Russia) M Sharapova	6	4	7

Quarterfinals
5	(Denmark) C Wozniacki	1	6	3
3	(Russia) M Sharapova	6	3	6

==== Section 4 ====
First round
8	(Russia) E Makarova	2	1
(Russia) S Kuznetsova	6	6
(Spain) G Muguruza	6	6
WC	(Spain) MT Torró Flor	1	1
(Estonia) K Kanepi	6	6
(United States) M Keys	4	3
(Australia) S Stosur	4	6	6
12	(Germany) A Kerber	6	3	3
13	(Czech Republic) L Šafářová	6	6
(United States) A Riske	4	2
(Italy) C Giorgi	1	1
(Bulgaria) T Pironkova	6	6
(Italy) R Vinci	2	7^{8}	6
(Puerto Rico) M Puig	6	6^{6}	4
(France) A Cornet	7^{8}	6
2	(Romania) S Halep	6^{6}	3

Second round
(Russia) S Kuznetsova	6	5	7
(Spain) G Muguruza	3	7	5
(Estonia) K Kanepi	3	2
(Australia) S Stosur	6	6
13	(Czech Republic) L Šafářová	6	6
(Bulgaria) T Pironkova	3	1
(Italy) R Vinci	6	7
(France) A Cornet	4	5

Third round
(Russia) S Kuznetsova	5	6	7^{7}
(Australia) S Stosur	7	2	6^{5}
13	(Czech Republic) L Šafářová	6	6^{6}	6
(Italy) R Vinci	4	7^{8}	0

Quarterfinals
(Russia) S Kuznetsova	5	7^{7}	7^{7}
13	(Czech Republic) L Šafářová	7	6^{5}	6^{3}

== Qualifying ==
=== Seeds ===
1. (Kazakhstan) Yaroslava Shvedova (first round)
2. (Ukraine) Lesia Tsurenko (first round)
3. (United States) Lauren Davis (qualifying competition)
4. (France) Kristina Mladenovic (first round)
5. (Romania) Monica Niculescu (qualifying competition)
6. (Serbia) Bojana Jovanovski (qualifying competition)
7. (Croatia) Mirjana Lučić-Baroni (qualified)
8. (United States) Christina McHale (qualified)
9. (Germany) Julia Görges (qualified)
10. (Slovenia) Polona Hercog (first round)
11. (Russia) Elena Vesnina (first round)
12. (Czech Republic) Lucie Hradecká (withdrew, still competing in Prague)
13. (Germany) Annika Beck (first round)
14. (New Zealand) Marina Erakovic (qualified)
15. (Croatia) Ana Konjuh (first round)
16. (Switzerland) Stefanie Vögele (qualifying competition)
17. (Romania) Andreea Mitu (qualified)

=== Qualifiers ===
1. (Germany) Julia Görges
2. (Romania) Andreea Mitu
3. (Spain) Paula Badosa Gibert
4. (Belarus) Olga Govortsova
5. (New Zealand) Marina Erakovic
6. (Colombia) Mariana Duque Mariño
7. (Croatia) Mirjana Lučić-Baroni
8. (United States) Christina McHale

=== Qualifying draw ===
==== First qualifier ====
First round
1	(Kazakhstan) Yaroslava Shvedova	3	2
(Bulgaria) Sesil Karatantcheva	6	6
WC	(Spain) Rocío de la Torre Sánchez	5	4
9	(Germany) Julia Görges	7	6

Qualifying competition
(Bulgaria) Sesil Karatantcheva	3	6	3
9	(Germany) Julia Görges	6	4	6

==== Second qualifier ====
First round
2	(Ukraine) Lesia Tsurenko	5	2
(Netherlands) Richèl Hogenkamp	7	6
(Russia) Alla Kudryavtseva	5	6^{3}
17	(Romania) Andreea Mitu	7	7^{7}

Qualifying competition
(Netherlands) Richèl Hogenkamp	0	6^{5}
17	(Romania) Andreea Mitu	6	7^{7}

==== Third qualifier ====
First round
3	(United States) Lauren Davis	6	7^{7}
(Spain) Lourdes Domínguez Lino	1	6^{5}
WC	(Spain) Paula Badosa Gibert	6	6
15	(Croatia) Ana Konjuh	3	3

Qualifying competition
3	(United States) Lauren Davis	5	4
WC	(Spain) Paula Badosa Gibert	7	6

==== Fourth qualifier ====
First round
4	(France) Kristina Mladenovic	3	5
(Japan) Misaki Doi	6	7
(Belarus) Olga Govortsova	6	6
10	(Slovenia) Polona Hercog	4	3

Qualifying competition
(Japan) Misaki Doi	6^{4}	6^{1}
(Belarus) Olga Govortsova	7^{7}	7^{7}

==== Fifth qualifier ====
First round
5	(Romania) Monica Niculescu	4	6	6
Alt	(Canada) Gabriela Dabrowski	6	3	0
(Ukraine) Kateryna Bondarenko	3	6	3
14	(New Zealand) Marina Erakovic	6	4	6

Qualifying competition
5	(Romania) Monica Niculescu	6	6^{8}	3
14	(New Zealand) Marina Erakovic	2	7^{10}	6

==== Sixth qualifier ====
First round
6	(Serbia) Bojana Jovanovski	7	7^{7}
WC	(Spain) Sara Sorribes Tormo	5	6^{4}
(Colombia) Mariana Duque Mariño	6	6^{6}	6
13	(Germany) Annika Beck	2	7^{8}	4

Qualifying competition
6	(Serbia) Bojana Jovanovski	3	3
(Colombia) Mariana Duque Mariño	6	6

==== Seventh qualifier ====
First round
7	(Croatia) Mirjana Lučić-Baroni	6	4	6
(Australia) Anastasia Rodionova	2	6	1
WC	(Spain) Olga Sáez Larra	3	0
16	(Switzerland) Stefanie Vögele	6	6

Qualifying competition
7	(Croatia) Mirjana Lučić-Baroni	6	6
16	(Switzerland) Stefanie Vögele	2	0

==== Eighth qualifier ====
First round
8	(United States) Christina McHale	6	6
(China) Zhu Lin	3	3
(Croatia) Donna Vekić	1	7^{7}	6
11	(Russia) Elena Vesnina	6	6^{5}	3

Qualifying competition
8	(United States) Christina McHale	6	6
(Croatia) Donna Vekić	3	2
