= 2015 Mutua Madrid Open – Women's doubles =

Women's doubles
- 2015 Mutua Madrid Open

Final
- Champions: (Australia) Casey Dellacqua (Kazakhstan) Yaroslava Shvedova
- Runners-up: (Spain) Garbiñe Muguruza (Spain) Carla Suárez Navarro
- Score: 6–3, 6–7^{(4–7)}, [10–5]

Events
Singles	men	women
Doubles	men	women
← 2014 ·	Mutua Madrid Open	· 2016 →

Sara Errani and Roberta Vinci were the defending champions, but chose not to participate this year.
First-time pairings Casey Dellacqua and Yaroslava Shvedova won the title, defeating Garbiñe Muguruza and Carla Suárez Navarro in the final, 6–3, 6–7^{(4–7)}, [10–5].

== Seeds ==
The top four seeds receive a bye into the second round.

1. (Switzerland) Martina Hingis / (India) Sania Mirza (quarterfinals)
2. (Russia) Ekaterina Makarova / (Russia) Elena Vesnina (quarterfinals)
3. (Spain) Garbiñe Muguruza / (Spain) Carla Suárez Navarro (final)
4. (Chinese Taipei) Hsieh Su-wei / (Italy) Flavia Pennetta (quarterfinals)
5. (United States) Raquel Kops-Jones / (United States) Abigail Spears (second round, retired)
6. (France) Caroline Garcia / (Slovenia) Katarina Srebotnik (first round)
7. (United States) Bethanie Mattek-Sands / (Czech Republic) Lucie Šafářová (semifinals)
8. (Czech Republic) Andrea Hlaváčková / (Czech Republic) Lucie Hradecká (first round)

== Draw ==
=== Key ===
- Q = Qualifier
- WC = Wild card
- LL = Lucky loser
- Alt = Alternate
- SE = Special exempt
- PR = Protected ranking
- ITF = ITF entry
- JE = Junior exempt
- w/o = Walkover
- r = Retired
- d = Defaulted
- SR = Special ranking

=== Finals ===
Semifinals
7	(United States) Bethanie Mattek-Sands (Czech Republic) Lucie Šafářová	5	6	[7]
(Australia) Casey Dellacqua (Kazakhstan) Yaroslava Shvedova	7	3	[10]
3	(Spain) Garbiñe Muguruza (Spain) Carla Suárez Navarro	6	3	[10]
(France) Kristina Mladenovic (Czech Republic) Karolína Plíšková	1	6	[6]

Final
(Australia) Casey Dellacqua (Kazakhstan) Yaroslava Shvedova	6	6^{4}	[10]
3	(Spain) Garbiñe Muguruza (Spain) Carla Suárez Navarro	3	7^{7}	[5]

=== Top half ===
First round
(Netherlands) M Krajicek (Czech Republic) B Strýcová	6	2	[5]
(Slovakia) J Husárová (Romania) R Olaru	2	6	[10]
(Poland) K Jans-Ignacik (Slovenia) A Klepač	6	6
(Canada) G Dabrowski (Poland) A Rosolska	1	3
(Australia) J Gajdošová (Croatia) A Tomljanović	4	3
7	(United States) B Mattek-Sands (Czech Republic) L Šafářová	6	6
(Russia) A Kudryavtseva (Russia) A Pavlyuchenkova	6	6
(Spain) S Soler Espinosa (Spain) MT Torró Flor	4	3
(Australia) An Rodionova (Australia) Ar Rodionova	7^{8}	6^{6}	[5]
(China) C Liang (Hungary) K Marosi	6^{6}	7^{8}	[10]
(Australia) C Dellacqua (Kazakhstan) Y Shvedova	7	6
6	(France) C Garcia (Slovenia) K Srebotnik	5	4

Second round
1	(Switzerland) M Hingis (India) S Mirza	6	6
(Slovakia) J Husárová (Romania) R Olaru	2	3
(Poland) K Jans-Ignacik (Slovenia) A Klepač	3	0
7	(United States) B Mattek-Sands (Czech Republic) L Šafářová	6	6
4	(Chinese Taipei) S-w Hsieh (Italy) F Pennetta	1	6	[10]
(Russia) A Kudryavtseva (Russia) A Pavlyuchenkova	6	0	[4]
(China) C Liang (Hungary) K Marosi	1	5
(Australia) C Dellacqua (Kazakhstan) Y Shvedova	6	7

Quarterfinals
1	(Switzerland) M Hingis (India) S Mirza	7^{7}	3	[9]
7	(United States) B Mattek-Sands (Czech Republic) L Šafářová	6^{5}	6	[11]
4	(Chinese Taipei) S-w Hsieh (Italy) F Pennetta	4	1
(Australia) C Dellacqua (Kazakhstan) Y Shvedova	6	6

Semifinals
7	(United States) B Mattek-Sands (Czech Republic) L Šafářová	5	6	[7]
(Australia) C Dellacqua (Kazakhstan) Y Shvedova	7	3	[10]

=== Bottom half ===
First round
8	(Czech Republic) A Hlaváčková (Czech Republic) L Hradecká	3	2
Alt	(Spain) L Arruabarrena (Romania) I-C Begu	6	6
(Croatia) D Jurak (Spain) A Parra Santonja	1	7^{7}	[11]
WC	(Russia) V Dushevina (Spain) MJ Martínez Sánchez	6	6^{4}	[13]
(Germany) A-L Grönefeld (Russia) A Panova	6	6
WC	(France) A Cornet (United Kingdom) H Watson	3	4
5	(United States) R Kops-Jones (United States) A Spears	6	7
(Kazakhstan) Z Diyas (China) S Peng	3	5
(Spain) A Medina Garrigues (Romania) M Niculescu	3	4
(France) K Mladenovic (Czech Republic) Ka Plíšková	6	6
WC	(United States) M Keys (United States) L Raymond	7	3	[10]
(New Zealand) M Erakovic (Germany) J Görges	5	6	[6]

Second round
Alt	(Spain) L Arruabarrena (Romania) I-C Begu	6	7^{12}
WC	(Russia) V Dushevina (Spain) MJ Martínez Sánchez	3	6^{10}
(Germany) A-L Grönefeld (Russia) A Panova	2	2
3	(Spain) G Muguruza (Spain) C Suárez Navarro	6	6
5	(United States) R Kops-Jones (United States) A Spears	4^{r}
(France) K Mladenovic (Czech Republic) Ka Plíšková	4
WC	(United States) M Keys (United States) L Raymond	2	6	[1]
2	(Russia) E Makarova (Russia) E Vesnina	6	1	[10]

Quarterfinals
Alt	(Spain) L Arruabarrena (Romania) I-C Begu	2	2
3	(Spain) G Muguruza (Spain) C Suárez Navarro	6	6
(France) K Mladenovic (Czech Republic) Ka Plíšková	6	6
2	(Russia) E Makarova (Russia) E Vesnina	3	4

Semifinals
3	(Spain) G Muguruza (Spain) C Suárez Navarro	6	3	[10]
(France) K Mladenovic (Czech Republic) Ka Plíšková	1	6	[6]
