= 2014 Mutua Madrid Open – Men's singles =

Men's singles
- 2014 Mutua Madrid Open

Final
- Champion: (Spain) Rafael Nadal
- Runner-up: (Japan) Kei Nishikori
- Score: 2–6, 6–4, 3–0, ret.

Details
- Draw: 56
- Seeds: 16

Events
Singles	men	women
Doubles	men	women
- Mutua Madrid Open

Defending champion Rafael Nadal won the men's singles tennis title at the 2014 Madrid Open after Kei Nishikori retired from the final due to a back injury, with the scoreline at 2–6, 6–4, 3–0. Nadal became the first man to defend the singles title at the Madrid Open since the tournament's inception in 2002.

== Seeds ==
The top eight seeds receive a bye into the second round.

1. (Spain) Rafael Nadal (champion)
2. (Serbia) ~~Novak Djokovic~~ (withdrew, right arm injury)
3. (Switzerland) Stanislas Wawrinka (second round)
4. (Switzerland) ~~Roger Federer~~ (withdrew, personal reasons)
5. (Spain) David Ferrer (semifinals)
6. (Czech Republic) Tomáš Berdych (quarterfinals)
7. (United Kingdom) Andy Murray (third round)
8. (Canada) Milos Raonic (third round)
9. (United States) John Isner (third round)
10. (Japan) Kei Nishikori (final, retired with a back injury)
11. (France) Jo-Wilfried Tsonga (second round)
12. (Bulgaria) Grigor Dimitrov (third round)
13. (Italy) Fabio Fognini (first round)
14. (Germany) Tommy Haas (first round)
15. (Russia) Mikhail Youzhny (second round)
16. (Spain) Tommy Robredo (first round)

Click on the seed number of a player to go to their draw section.

== Draw ==
Key

- Q = Qualifier
- WC = Wild card
- LL = Lucky loser
- Alt = Alternate
- ITF = ITF entry
- PR = Protected ranking
- SR = Special ranking
- SE = Special exempt
- JE = Junior exempt
- JR = Junior Accelerator Programme entrant
- CO = College Accelerator Programme entrant
- NG = Next Gen Accelerator Program entrant
- w/o = Walkover
- r = Retired
- d = Defaulted

=== Finals ===
Quarterfinals
1	(Spain) Rafael Nadal	6	6
6	(Czech Republic) Tomáš Berdych	4	2
(Spain) Roberto Bautista Agut	6	6
Q	(Colombia) Santiago Giraldo	3	4
10	(Japan) Kei Nishikori	6	6
(Spain) Feliciano López	4	4
5	(Spain) David Ferrer	7^{7}	6
(Latvia) Ernests Gulbis	6^{3}	3

Semifinals
1	(Spain) Rafael Nadal	6	6
(Spain) Roberto Bautista Agut	4	3
10	(Japan) Kei Nishikori	7^{7}	5	6
5	(Spain) David Ferrer	6^{5}	7	3

Final
1	(Spain) Rafael Nadal	2	6	3
10	(Japan) Kei Nishikori	6	4	0^{r}

=== Top half ===
==== Section 1 ====
First round
PR	(Austria) J Melzer	4	3
(Argentina) J Mónaco	6	6
(Finland) J Nieminen	6	6
(Netherlands) R Haase	3	2
Q	(Netherlands) I Sijsling	3	6	6
14	(Germany) T Haas	6	1	4
12	(Bulgaria) G Dimitrov	6	6
WC	(Spain) P Carreño Busta	2	4
WC	(Romania) M Copil	6	6
(Spain) M Granollers	3	4
(South Africa) K Anderson	3	6	6
(Czech Republic) R Štěpánek	6	3	4

Second round
1	(Spain) R Nadal	6	6
(Argentina) J Mónaco	1	0
(Finland) J Nieminen	6	6
Q	(Netherlands) I Sijsling	3	2
12	(Bulgaria) G Dimitrov	4	6	7^{9}
WC	(Romania) M Copil	6	3	6^{7}
(South Africa) K Anderson	1	4
6	(Czech Republic) T Berdych	6	6

Third round
1	(Spain) R Nadal	6	6
(Finland) J Nieminen	1	4
12	(Bulgaria) G Dimitrov	6	3	2
6	(Czech Republic) T Berdych	3	6	6

Quarterfinals
1	(Spain) R Nadal	6	6
6	(Czech Republic) T Berdych	4	2

==== Section 2 ====
First round
(France) B Paire	0^{r}
(France) G Simon	2
(Italy) A Seppi	3	6^{3}
(Spain) F Verdasco	6	7^{7}
(Spain) R Bautista Agut	6	6
16	(Spain) T Robredo	4	4
11	(France) J-W Tsonga	6	4	6
(France) É Roger-Vasselin	3	6	3
Q	(Colombia) S Giraldo	7	4	6
(Australia) L Hewitt	5	6	2
Q	(Kazakhstan) A Golubev	3	7^{11}	6^{4}
(Spain) N Almagro	6	6^{9}	7^{7}

Second round
LL	(Poland) Ł Kubot	7	2	6
(France) G Simon	5	6	4
(Spain) F Verdasco	6	6^{4}	1
(Spain) R Bautista Agut	2	7^{7}	6
11	(France) J-W Tsonga	4	3
Q	(Colombia) S Giraldo	6	6
(Spain) N Almagro	1	6	4
7	(United Kingdom) A Murray	6	1	6

Third round
LL	(Poland) Ł Kubot	4	2
(Spain) R Bautista Agut	6	6
Q	(Colombia) S Giraldo	6	6
7	(United Kingdom) A Murray	3	2

Quarterfinals
(Spain) R Bautista Agut	6	6
Q	(Colombia) S Giraldo	3	4

=== Bottom half ===
==== Section 3 ====
First round
(Czech Republic) L Rosol	6	3	4
(France) J Chardy	4	6	6
WC	(Spain) G García López	6	2	6
(Spain) P Andújar	2	6	2
(Croatia) I Dodig	4	4
10	(Japan) K Nishikori	6	6
15	(Russia) M Youzhny	6	6
Q	(Germany) B Becker	3	4
(Argentina) F Delbonis	6^{4}	6	2
(Spain) F López	7^{7}	4	6
Q	(Austria) D Thiem	6	6
(Russia) D Tursunov	4	2

Second round
8	(Canada) M Raonic	6	6
(France) J Chardy	3	3
WC	(Spain) G García López	3	1
10	(Japan) K Nishikori	6	6
15	(Russia) M Youzhny	6	3	4
(Spain) F López	3	6	6
Q	(Austria) D Thiem	1	6	6
3	(Switzerland) S Wawrinka	6	2	4

Third round
8	(Canada) M Raonic	6^{5}	6^{5}
10	(Japan) K Nishikori	7^{7}	7^{7}
(Spain) F López	w/o
Q	(Austria) D Thiem

Quarterfinals
10	(Japan) K Nishikori	6	6
(Spain) F López	4	4

==== Section 4 ====
First round
WC	(Spain) A Ramos	6	7^{9}
(France) N Mahut	1	6^{7}
LL	(Australia) M Matosevic	6	6
(Germany) P Kohlschreiber	2	2
Q	(Russia) T Gabashvili	6^{8}	4
9	(United States) J Isner	7^{10}	6
13	(Italy) F Fognini	5	6	3
(Ukraine) A Dolgopolov	7	4	6
(Latvia) E Gulbis	7^{7}	3	6
(Poland) J Janowicz	6^{5}	6	2
(Croatia) M Čilić	6	6
(Portugal) J Sousa	1	1

Second round
5	(Spain) D Ferrer	7^{8}	5	6
WC	(Spain) A Ramos	6^{6}	7	3
LL	(Australia) M Matosevic	6^{9}	7^{7}	5
9	(United States) J Isner	7^{11}	6^{5}	7
(Ukraine) A Dolgopolov	3	4
(Latvia) E Gulbis	6	6
(Croatia) M Čilić	6	1	6
Q	(France) P-H Mathieu	4	6	2

Third round
5	(Spain) D Ferrer	6	6
9	(United States) J Isner	4	4
(Latvia) E Gulbis	6	6
(Croatia) M Čilić	3	4

Quarterfinals
5	(Spain) D Ferrer	7^{7}	6
(Latvia) E Gulbis	6^{3}	3

== Qualifying ==
=== Seeds ===
1. (Colombia) Santiago Giraldo (qualified)
2. (France) Julien Benneteau (first round)
3. (Russia) Teymuraz Gabashvili (qualified)
4. (Netherlands) Igor Sijsling (qualified)
5. (Kazakhstan) Andrey Golubev (qualified)
6. (Germany) Benjamin Becker (qualified)
7. (Australia) Marinko Matosevic (qualifying competition, Lucky loser)
8. (Austria) Dominic Thiem (qualified)
9. (Colombia) Alejandro Falla (first round)
10. (Kazakhstan) Oleksandr Nedovyesov (first round, retired)
11. (Poland) Łukasz Kubot (qualifying competition, Lucky loser)
12. (Australia) Bernard Tomic (qualifying competition)
13. (Colombia) Alejandro González (qualifying competition)
14. (France) Paul-Henri Mathieu (qualified)

=== Qualifiers ===
1. (Colombia) Santiago Giraldo
2. (France) Paul-Henri Mathieu
3. (Russia) Teymuraz Gabashvili
4. (Netherlands) Igor Sijsling
5. (Kazakhstan) Andrey Golubev
6. (Germany) Benjamin Becker
7. (Austria) Dominic Thiem

=== Lucky losers ===
1. (Australia) Marinko Matosevic
2. (Poland) Łukasz Kubot

=== Qualifying draw ===
==== First qualifier ====
First round
1	(Colombia) Santiago Giraldo	6	6
(Russia) Evgeny Donskoy	3	2
(Germany) Tobias Kamke	6	4
10	(Kazakhstan) Oleksandr Nedovyesov	4	0^{r}

Qualifying competition
1	(Colombia) Santiago Giraldo	4	6	6
(Germany) Tobias Kamke	6	1	2

==== Second qualifier ====
First round
2	(France) Julien Benneteau	3	4
(United States) Ryan Harrison	6	6
WC	(Spain) Daniel Muñoz de la Nava	5	3
14	(France) Paul-Henri Mathieu	7	6

Qualifying competition
(United States) Ryan Harrison	2	4
14	(France) Paul-Henri Mathieu	6	6

==== Third qualifier ====
First round
3	(Russia) Teymuraz Gabashvili	6	6
WC	(France) Lucas Pouille	2	4
(Spain) Pere Riba	1	6^{5}
11	(Poland) Łukasz Kubot	6	7^{7}

Qualifying competition
3	(Russia) Teymuraz Gabashvili	6	6
11	(Poland) Łukasz Kubot	3	3

==== Fourth qualifier ====
First round
4	(Netherlands) Igor Sijsling	6	6
(France) Adrian Mannarino	1	1
(Brazil) Thomaz Bellucci	6	1	6
9	(Colombia) Alejandro Falla	3	6	3

Qualifying competition
4	(Netherlands) Igor Sijsling	6	3	6
(Brazil) Thomaz Bellucci	2	6	3

==== Fifth qualifier ====
First round
5	(Kazakhstan) Andrey Golubev	6	6
WC	(Spain) Roberto Carballés Baena	4	4
WC	(Spain) Íñigo Cervantes	4	2
13	(Colombia) Alejandro González	6	6

Qualifying competition
5	(Kazakhstan) Andrey Golubev	6	2	6
13	(Colombia) Alejandro González	4	6	3

==== Sixth qualifier ====
First round
6	(Germany) Benjamin Becker	7	6
(Germany) Michael Berrer	5	3
Alt	(France) Michaël Llodra	4	4
12	(Australia) Bernard Tomic	6	6

Qualifying competition
6	(Germany) Benjamin Becker	3	7^{7}	6
12	(Australia) Bernard Tomic	6	6^{4}	4

==== Seventh qualifier ====
First round
7	(Australia) Marinko Matosevic	6	6^{1}	6
(Ukraine) Sergiy Stakhovsky	4	7^{7}	1
(Argentina) Leonardo Mayer	7^{8}	2	4
8	(Austria) Dominic Thiem	6^{6}	6	6

Qualifying competition
7	(Australia) Marinko Matosevic	4	4
8	(Austria) Dominic Thiem	6	6
