= 2016 Mutua Madrid Open – Women's singles =

Women's singles
- 2016 Mutua Madrid Open

Final
- Champion: (Romania) Simona Halep
- Runner-up: (Slovakia) Dominika Cibulková
- Score: 6–2, 6–4

Events
Singles	men	women
Doubles	men	women
← 2015 ·	Mutua Madrid Open	· 2017 →

Simona Halep defeated Dominika Cibulková in the final, 6–2, 6–4 to win the women's singles tennis title at the 2016 Madrid Open.

Petra Kvitová was the defending champion, but lost in the third round to Daria Gavrilova.

== Seeds ==
1. (Poland) Agnieszka Radwańska (first round)
2. (Germany) Angelique Kerber (first round)
3. (Spain) Garbiñe Muguruza (second round)
4. (Belarus) Victoria Azarenka (third round, withdrew)
5. (Czech Republic) Petra Kvitová (third round)
6. (Romania) Simona Halep (champion)
7. (Italy) Roberta Vinci (first round)
8. (Spain) Carla Suárez Navarro (third round)

9. (Russia) Svetlana Kuznetsova (first round)
10. (Switzerland) Timea Bacsinszky (third round)
11. (Czech Republic) Lucie Šafářová (second round, withdrew)
12. (Ukraine) Elina Svitolina (second round)
13. (Czech Republic) Karolína Plíšková (second round)
14. (Serbia) Ana Ivanovic (second round)
15. (Italy) Sara Errani (first round)
16. (United States) Sloane Stephens (second round)

== Draw ==
=== Key ===
- Q = Qualifier
- WC = Wild card
- LL = Lucky loser
- Alt = Alternate
- SE = Special exempt
- PR = Protected ranking
- ITF = ITF entry
- JE = Junior exempt
- w/o = Walkover
- r = Retired
- d = Defaulted
- SR = Special ranking

=== Finals ===
Quarterfinals
(Slovakia) Dominika Cibulková	4	6	6
WC	(Romania) Sorana Cîrstea	6	3	3
Q	(United States) Louisa Chirico	7^{7}	6
(Australia) Daria Gavrilova	6^{1}	2
6	(Romania) Simona Halep	6	0	6
(Romania) Irina-Camelia Begu	3	6	1
(Australia) Samantha Stosur	6	6
Q	(Romania) Patricia Maria Țig	3	4

Semifinals
(Slovakia) Dominika Cibulková	6	6
Q	(United States) Louisa Chirico	1	1
6	(Romania) Simona Halep	6	6
(Australia) Samantha Stosur	2	0

Final
(Slovakia) Dominika Cibulková	2	4
6	(Romania) Simona Halep	6	6

=== Top half ===
==== Section 1 ====
First round
1	(Poland) A Radwańska	4	7^{7}	3
(Slovakia) D Cibulková	6	6^{3}	6
(France) C Garcia	6	2
(United Kingdom) J Konta	4	1^{r}
(Ukraine) L Tsurenko	2	1
(Russia) A Pavlyuchenkova	6	6
(Italy) C Giorgi	7	7
15	(Italy) S Errani	5	5
9	(Russia) S Kuznetsova	0	6	3
Q	(Germany) L Siegemund	6	3	6
(France) K Mladenovic	2	3
Q	(Croatia) M Lučić-Baroni	6	6
(Serbia) J Janković	4	3
WC	(Romania) S Cîrstea	6	6
(Montenegro) D Kovinić	6	6
7	(Italy) R Vinci	4	2

Second round
(Slovakia) D Cibulková	0	6	6
(France) C Garcia	6	3	4
(Russia) A Pavlyuchenkova	w/o
(Italy) C Giorgi
Q	(Germany) L Siegemund	6	3	6
Q	(Croatia) M Lučić-Baroni	2	6	3
WC	(Romania) S Cîrstea	6	7
(Montenegro) D Kovinić	3	5

Third round
(Slovakia) D Cibulková	2	6	7
(Russia) A Pavlyuchenkova	6	3	5
Q	(Germany) L Siegemund	4	6^{9}
WC	(Romania) S Cîrstea	6	7^{11}

Quarterfinals
(Slovakia) D Cibulková	4	6	6
WC	(Romania) S Cîrstea	6	3	3

==== Section 2 ====
First round
4	(Belarus) V Azarenka	6	6
PR	(United Kingdom) L Robson	4	2
(France) A Cornet	2	6	2
WC	(Spain) P Badosa Gibert	6	2	2^{r}
Q	(United States) L Chirico	7	6
(Romania) M Niculescu	5	1
Q	(Czech Republic) K Siniaková	3	6	4
14	(Serbia) A Ivanovic	6	3	6
12	(Ukraine) E Svitolina	4	6	6
(Belgium) Y Wickmayer	6	3	4
(Australia) D Gavrilova	7	6
LL	(United Kingdom) H Watson	5	4
Q	(Russia) E Vesnina	7	6
(Latvia) J Ostapenko	5	0
WC	(Spain) L Arruabarrena	3	2
5	(Czech Republic) P Kvitová	6	6

Second round
4	(Belarus) V Azarenka	6	6
(France) A Cornet	3	2
Q	(United States) L Chirico	5	6	6
14	(Serbia) A Ivanovic	7	1	3
12	(Ukraine) E Svitolina	2	6^{4}
(Australia) D Gavrilova	6	7^{7}
Q	(Russia) E Vesnina	3	3
5	(Czech Republic) P Kvitová	6	6

Third round
4	(Belarus) V Azarenka
Q	(United States) L Chirico	w/o
(Australia) D Gavrilova	6	6
5	(Czech Republic) P Kvitová	3	4

Quarterfinals
Q	(United States) L Chirico	7^{7}	6
(Australia) D Gavrilova	6^{1}	2

=== Bottom half ===
==== Section 3 ====
First round
6	(Romania) S Halep	6	6
(Japan) M Doi	0	3
PR	(Italy) K Knapp	4	6	6
(Russia) M Gasparyan	6	3	2
(Germany) A Beck	3	4
(Russia) E Makarova	6	6
(Germany) A Petkovic	4	6	3
10	(Switzerland) T Bacsinszky	6	2	6
13	(Czech Republic) Ka Plíšková	6	6
WC	(Spain) L Domínguez Lino	2	1
(Germany) A-L Friedsam	0	4
(United States) C McHale	6	6
(Romania) I-C Begu	6	3	6
(Canada) E Bouchard	4	6	4
(Slovakia) AK Schmiedlová	2	5
3	(Spain) G Muguruza	6	7

Second round
6	(Romania) S Halep	6	6
PR	(Italy) K Knapp	1	1
(Russia) E Makarova	4	7	4
10	(Switzerland) T Bacsinszky	6	5	6
13	(Czech Republic) Ka Plíšková	6^{3}	4
(United States) C McHale	7^{7}	6
(Romania) I-C Begu	5	7^{7}	6
3	(Spain) G Muguruza	7	6^{4}	3

Third round
6	(Romania) S Halep	6	6
10	(Switzerland) T Bacsinszky	2	3
(United States) C McHale	7^{8}	4	4
(Romania) I-C Begu	6^{6}	6	6

Quarterfinals
6	(Romania) S Halep	6	0	6
(Romania) I-C Begu	3	6	1

==== Section 4 ====
First round
8	(Spain) C Suárez Navarro	3	6	6
(Hungary) T Babos	6	2	3
(Germany) S Lisicki	6	6
Q	(Puerto Rico) M Puig	1	3
WC	(Spain) S Sorribes Tormo	1	3
(Australia) S Stosur	6	6
(United States) C Vandeweghe	6^{4}	1
11	(Czech Republic) L Šafářová	7^{7}	6
16	(United States) S Stephens	3	6	6
(Brazil) T Pereira	6	3	2
(Russia) D Kasatkina	3	6	2
Q	(Romania) PM Țig	6	4	6
Q	(United States) A Riske	6	3	4
(United States) M Keys	1	6	6
(Czech Republic) B Strýcová	6	6
2	(Germany) A Kerber	4	2

Second round
8	(Spain) C Suárez Navarro	6	6
(Germany) S Lisicki	3	2
(Australia) S Stosur	w/o
11	(Czech Republic) L Šafářová
16	(United States) S Stephens	2	3
Q	(Romania) PM Țig	6	6
(United States) M Keys	6	6
(Czech Republic) B Strýcová	3	3

Third round
8	(Spain) C Suárez Navarro	6	2	3
(Australia) S Stosur	4	6	6
Q	(Romania) PM Țig	6	6
(United States) M Keys	3	4

Quarterfinals
(Australia) S Stosur	6	6
Q	(Romania) PM Țig	3	4

== Qualifying ==
=== Seeds ===
1. (Germany) Laura Siegemund (qualified)
2. (Russia) Elena Vesnina (qualified)
3. (United Kingdom) Heather Watson (qualifying competition, lucky loser)
4. (Germany) Julia Görges (first round)
5. (Puerto Rico) Monica Puig (qualified)
6. (China) Zheng Saisai (first round)
7. (Ukraine) Kateryna Bondarenko (first round)
8. (United States) Irina Falconi (first round)
9. (United States) Madison Brengle (qualifying competition)
10. (United States) Nicole Gibbs (first round)
11. (Croatia) Mirjana Lučić-Baroni (qualified)
12. (Croatia) Ana Konjuh (first round)
13. (United Kingdom) Naomi Broady (qualifying competition)
14. (United States) Bethanie Mattek-Sands (qualifying competition)
15. (Kazakhstan) Yaroslava Shvedova (first round)
16. (United States) Alison Riske (qualified)

=== Qualifiers ===
1. (Germany) Laura Siegemund
2. (Russia) Elena Vesnina
3. (Croatia) Mirjana Lučić-Baroni
4. (Romania) Patricia Maria Țig
5. (Puerto Rico) Monica Puig
6. (United States) Alison Riske
7. (Czech Republic) Kateřina Siniaková
8. (United States) Louisa Chirico

=== Lucky loser ===
1. (United Kingdom) Heather Watson

=== Qualifying draw ===
==== First qualifier ====
First round
1	(Germany) Laura Siegemund	6	6
(Czech Republic) Kristýna Plíšková	2	3
(Slovenia) Polona Hercog	4	4
9	(United States) Madison Brengle	6	6

Qualifying competition
1	(Germany) Laura Siegemund	6	6
9	(United States) Madison Brengle	4	1

==== Second qualifier ====
First round
2	(Russia) Elena Vesnina	6	6
WC	(Spain) Sílvia Soler Espinosa	0	3
(Belarus) Aliaksandra Sasnovich	6	6
12	(Croatia) Ana Konjuh	4	3

Qualifying competition
2	(Russia) Elena Vesnina	6	6
(Belarus) Aliaksandra Sasnovich	3	0

==== Third qualifier ====
First round
3	(United Kingdom) Heather Watson	7^{11}	7^{7}
(Czech Republic) Lucie Hradecká	6^{9}	6^{4}
WC	(Spain) Rocío de la Torre Sánchez	2	0
11	(Croatia) Mirjana Lučić-Baroni	6	6

Qualifying competition
3	(United Kingdom) Heather Watson	6^{4}	2
11	(Croatia) Mirjana Lučić-Baroni	7^{7}	6

==== Fourth qualifier ====
First round
4	(Germany) Julia Görges	6^{4}	5
(Greece) Maria Sakkari	7^{7}	7
(Romania) Patricia Maria Țig	7	7^{8}
10	(United States) Nicole Gibbs	5	6^{6}

Qualifying competition
(Greece) Maria Sakkari	7	4	4
(Romania) Patricia Maria Țig	5	6	6

==== Fifth qualifier ====
First round
5	(Puerto Rico) Monica Puig	6	4	6
(Bulgaria) Tsvetana Pironkova	2	6	2
(France) Océane Dodin	2	4
13	(United Kingdom) Naomi Broady	6	6

Qualifying competition
5	(Puerto Rico) Monica Puig	3	6	6
13	(United Kingdom) Naomi Broady	6	3	3

==== Sixth qualifier ====
First round
6	(China) Zheng Saisai	4	6^{3}
(Japan) Naomi Osaka	6	7^{7}
WC	(Spain) Laura Pous Tió	1	3
16	(United States) Alison Riske	6	6

Qualifying competition
(Japan) Naomi Osaka	5	2^{r}
16	(United States) Alison Riske	7	3

==== Seventh qualifier ====
First round
7	(Ukraine) Kateryna Bondarenko	6	2	2
(Czech Republic) Kateřina Siniaková	4	6	6
(Croatia) Donna Vekić	1	2
14	(United States) Bethanie Mattek-Sands	6	6

Qualifying competition
(Czech Republic) Kateřina Siniaková	6	1	6
14	(United States) Bethanie Mattek-Sands	2	6	3

==== Eighth qualifier ====
First round
8	(United States) Irina Falconi	1	1
(United States) Louisa Chirico	6	6
(Colombia) Mariana Duque Mariño	6	6
15	(Kazakhstan) Yaroslava Shvedova	4	2

Qualifying competition
(United States) Louisa Chirico	7	6
(Colombia) Mariana Duque Mariño	5	1
