= Madrid Open (tennis) =

Coordinates: 40.3688°N 3.684°W

Mutua Madrid Open

Tournament information
- Founded: 2002; 24 years ago
- Editions: 24 (2026)
- Location: Madrid; Spain
- Venue: Madrid Arena (2002–2008); La Caja Mágica (since 2009)
- Surface: Hard – indoors (2002–2008); Clay – outdoors (since 2009)
- Website: mutuamadridopen.com

Current champions (2026)
- Men's singles: (Italy) Jannik Sinner
- Women's singles: (Ukraine) Marta Kostyuk
- Men's doubles: (Finland) Harri Heliövaara (United Kingdom) Henry Patten
- Women's doubles: (Czech Republic) Kateřina Siniaková (United States) Taylor Townsend
ATP Tour
- Category: ATP 1000
- Draw: 96S / 48Q / 32D
- Prize money: €8,235,540 (2026)
WTA Tour
- Category: WTA 1000
- Draw: 96S / 48Q / 32D
- Prize money: €8,235,540 (2026)

The Madrid Open is an annual professional tennis tournament held in Madrid, Spain. It is called "Mutua Madrid Open" since 2006 (for sponsorship reasons), on the official ATP, WTA and event's websites. It is played on clay courts at the Caja Mágica in Manzanares Park, San Fermín, and is held in late April and early May. The tournament is an ATP 1000 event on the ATP Tour and a WTA 1000 event on the WTA Tour. The tournament is now played on a red clay surface, though it was played on hard courts from 2002–2008 and blue clay courts in 2012.

Ion Țiriac, a Romanian billionaire businessman and former ATP professional, was the owner of the tournament between 2009 and 2021. According to Digi Sport which interviewed Țiriac in 2019, the tournament brings to the city of Madrid annual benefits exceeding €107 million. In 2021, Țiriac sold the tournament to New York–based IMG for approximately €390 million.

== History ==
From its inauguration as a men's only event in 2002, the tournament was classified as one of the ATP Masters Series tournaments, where it replaced the now-defunct Eurocard Open in Stuttgart. It was held in the Madrid Arena from 2002 to 2008, as the first of two Master's indoor hard court late-season events that preceded the ATP Tour Finals (also indoors). It was replaced on the Masters schedule by the Shanghai Masters after the 2008 season. In 2009, the tournament was reborn under new ownership with a new location, new surface, and a new time slot. It expanded to include a premier women's contest (replacing the tournament in Berlin) and shifted to an earlier period of the tennis season to become the second Master's tournament of the spring European clay-court swing (replacing the Hamburg Open). The event moved outdoors to Park Manzanares, where a new complex with a retractable-roof equipped main court was constructed, the Caja Magica.

Since 2006, the event is called the Mutua Madrid Open for sponsorship reasons. Țiriac announced in April 2019 that he had extended his sponsorship contract of the Mutua Madrid Open for 10 additional years, until 2031. Because he has agreed to continue in Madrid, Țiriac will receive more than 30 million euros from the city of Madrid in the coming years. Feliciano López was announced as the Madrid tournament director, commencing 2019.

Starting in 2021, the women's tournament, part of the WTA tour, expanded to become a two-week tournament. By December of the same year, it was announced that Tiriac sold the event to IMG, which is now the new organizer and has already planned an expansion of courts, including a new stadium for over 10,000 people, to be built by partly draining the lake circling Caja Magica.

In June 2022, ATP announced some changes to the ATP calendar for the coming year. The ATP 1000 event in Madrid along with those in Shanghai and in Rome would now be held over two weeks starting in 2023, thus becoming 12 day events just like the ATP 1000 events in Indian Wells and Miami.

=== Blue clay ===
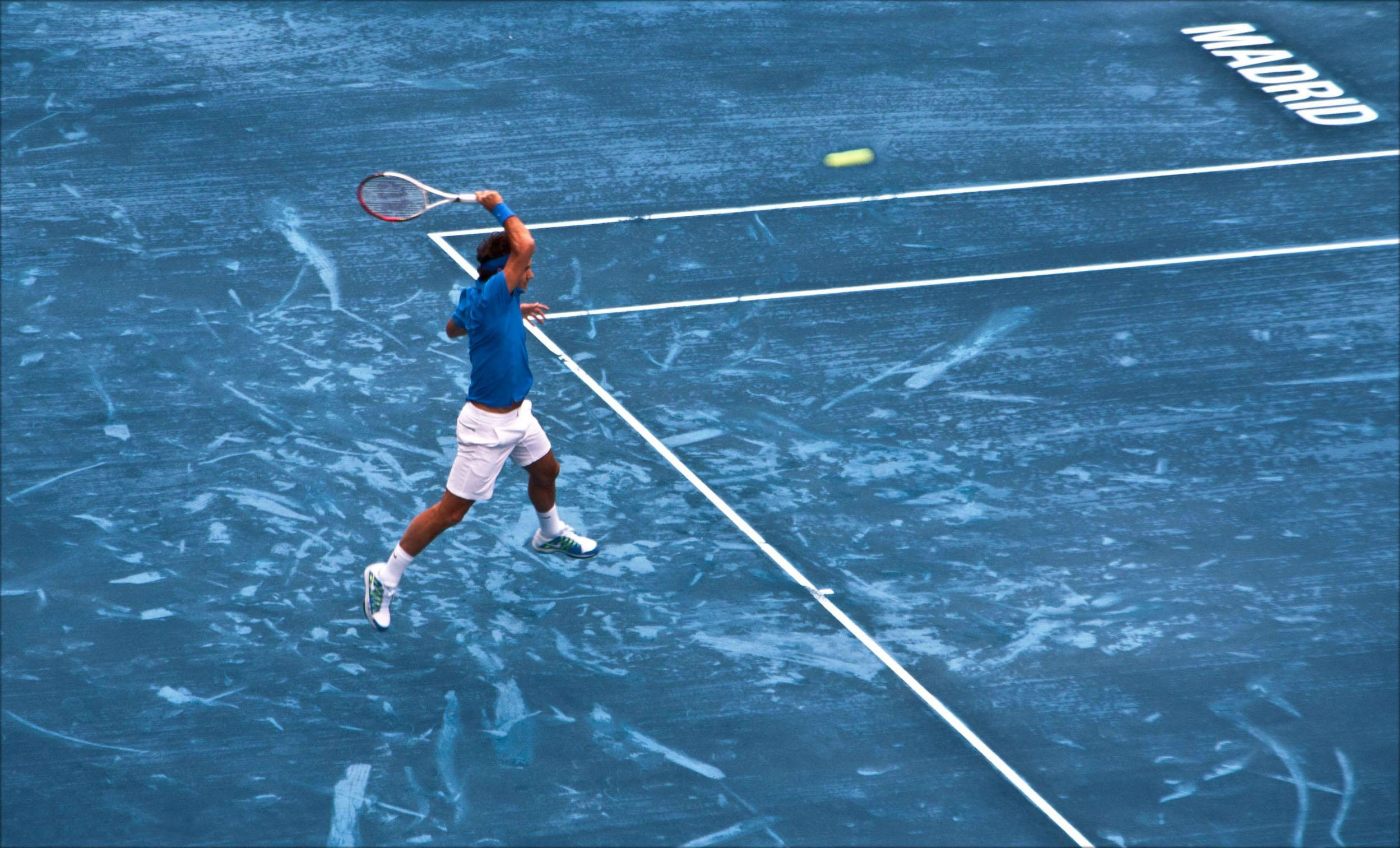
In 2012 blue clay was used for the first (and only) time in professional tennis

Țiriac proposed and implemented a new color of blue clay for all the courts' surfaces in 2012, motivating that it would supposedly be better visually, especially for viewers on television (analogous to some hardcourt surface events migrating to blue from various previous color schemes). Some speculated that the adaptation of blue colour was a nod to the titular sponsor of the tournament, the Spanish insurance giant Mutua Madrileña. This controversial change was subsequently granted and began to be used in the 2012 edition of the tournament. In 2009 one of the outer tennis courts had already been made of the new surface for the players to test it. Manuel Santana, the Open's director, had assured that aside from the colour, the surface kept the same properties as the traditional red clay.

On 1 December 2011, Țiriac confirmed that the blue clay surface was officially approved for the 2012 edition of the tournament, in both the ATP and WTA circuits.

However, after the event took place in 2012, threats of future boycotts from some players, especially Rafael Nadal and Novak Djokovic (who both lost on the blue surface), led the tournament to return to the traditional red clay for the 2013 season. This was due to the blue clay being more slippery than regular clay.

Roger Federer is the only male player to win the tournament on three different surfaces: hard courts (2006), red clay (2009), and blue clay (2012). Serena Williams is the only female player to win the tournament on two different surfaces: blue clay (2012) and red clay (2013).

== Prize money ==
The prize money awarded in the men's and women's singles tournaments is distributed equally. The total prize money for the 2025 tournament is €8,055,385. The prize money distribution is as follows:

Madrid Open 2025	W	F	SF	QF	4R (singles) 2R (doubles)	3R (singles) 1R (doubles)	2R	1R
Singles	€985,030	€523,870	€291,040	€165,670	€90,445	€52,925	€30,895	€20,820
Doubles	€400,560	€212,060	€113,880	€56,950	€30,540	€16,690	—N/a	—N/a

Doubles prize money is per team.

== Past finals ==
=== Men ===
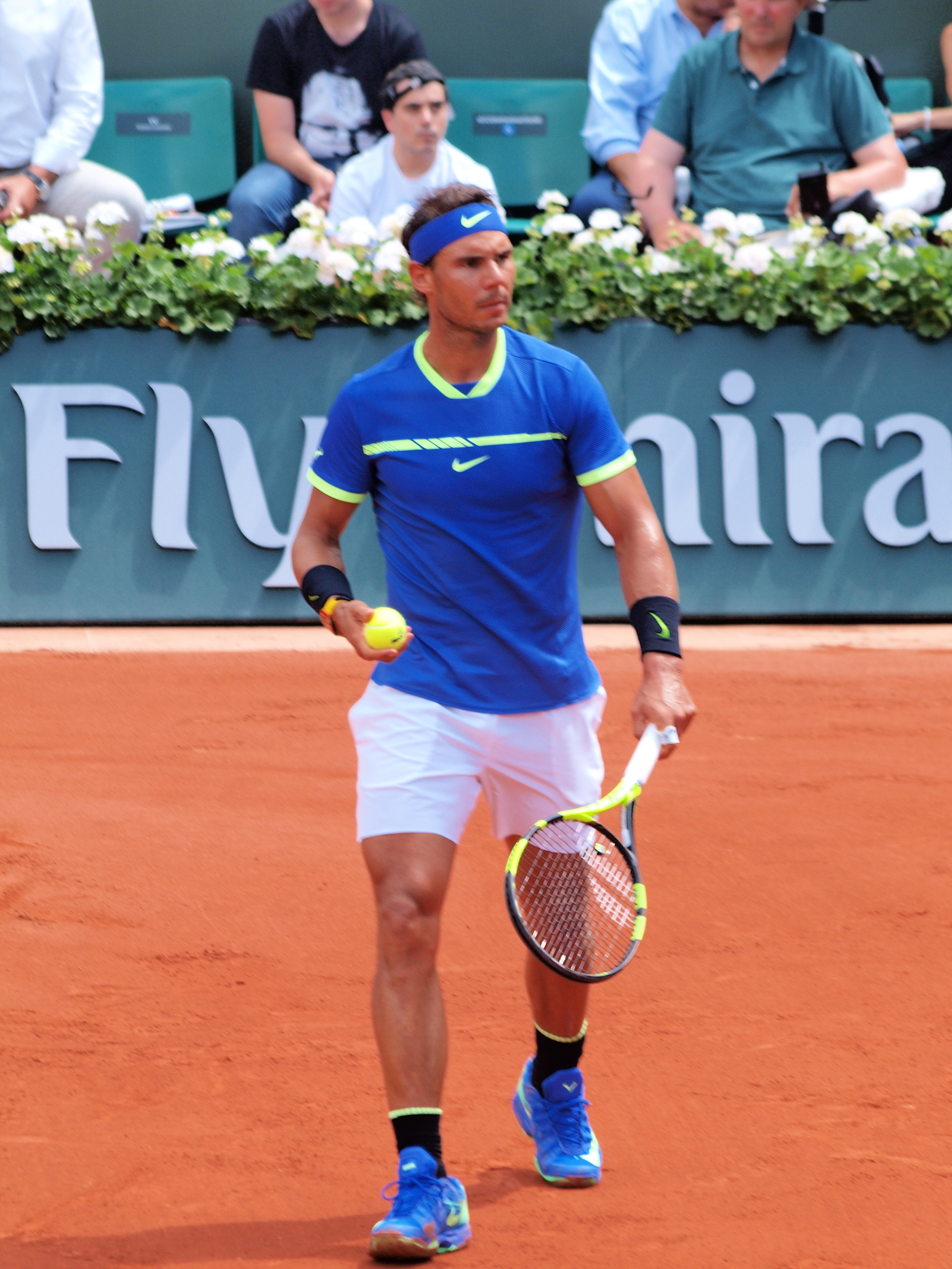
Spanish player Rafael Nadal clinched the title five times on home turf (a record).

==== Singles ====
Year	Champions	Runners-up	Score
↓ ATP Tour Masters 1000 (Note: Known as Masters Series till 2008.) ↓ Indoor hard court Era
2002	(United States) Andre Agassi	(Czech Republic) Jiří Novák	(walkover)
2003	(Spain) Juan Carlos Ferrero	(Chile) Nicolás Massú	6–3, 6–4, 6–3
2004	(Russia) Marat Safin	(Argentina) David Nalbandian	6–2, 6–4, 6–3
2005	(Spain) Rafael Nadal	(Croatia) Ivan Ljubičić	3–6, 2–6, 6–3, 6–4, 7–6^{(7–3)}
2006	(Switzerland) Roger Federer	(Chile) Fernando González	7–5, 6–1, 6–0
2007	(Argentina) David Nalbandian	(Switzerland) Roger Federer	1–6, 6–3, 6–3
2008	(United Kingdom) Andy Murray	(France) Gilles Simon	6–4, 7–6^{(8–6)}
↓ Clay court Era ↓
2009 (Note: Changed from indoor hard court to clay court, taking the place of the Hamburg Masters as a clay court Masters Series event.)	(Switzerland) Roger Federer (2)	(Spain) Rafael Nadal	6–4, 6–4
2010	(Spain) Rafael Nadal (2)	(Switzerland) Roger Federer	6–4, 7–6^{(7–5)}
2011	(Serbia) Novak Djokovic	(Spain) Rafael Nadal	7–5, 6–4
2012	(Switzerland) Roger Federer (3)	(Czech Republic) Tomáš Berdych	3–6, 7–5, 7–5
2013	(Spain) Rafael Nadal (3)	(Switzerland) Stan Wawrinka	6–2, 6–4
2014	(Spain) Rafael Nadal (4)	(Japan) Kei Nishikori	2–6, 6–4, 3–0 (ret.)
2015	(United Kingdom) Andy Murray (2)	(Spain) Rafael Nadal	6–3, 6–2
2016	(Serbia) Novak Djokovic (2)	(United Kingdom) Andy Murray	6–2, 3–6, 6–3
2017	(Spain) Rafael Nadal (5)	(Austria) Dominic Thiem	7–6^{(10–8)}, 6–4
2018	(Germany) Alexander Zverev	(Austria) Dominic Thiem	6–4, 6–4
2019	(Serbia) Novak Djokovic (3)	(Greece) Stefanos Tsitsipas	6–3, 6–4
2020	Cancelled due to the COVID-19 pandemic		
2021	(Germany) Alexander Zverev (2)	(Italy) Matteo Berrettini	6–7^{(8–10)}, 6–4, 6–3
2022	(Spain) Carlos Alcaraz	(Germany) Alexander Zverev	6–3, 6–1
2023	(Spain) Carlos Alcaraz (2)	(Germany) Jan-Lennard Struff	6–4, 3–6, 6–3
2024	(Note: Competed under no nationality due to the Russian invasion of Ukraine.) Andrey Rublev	(Canada) Félix Auger-Aliassime	4–6, 7–5, 7–5
2025	(Norway) Casper Ruud	(United Kingdom) Jack Draper	7–5, 3–6, 6–4
2026	(Italy) Jannik Sinner	(Germany) Alexander Zverev	6–1, 6–2

==== Doubles ====
Year	Champions	Runners-up	Score
↓ ATP Tour Masters 1000 ↓ Indoor hard court Era
2002	(The Bahamas) Mark Knowles (Canada) Daniel Nestor	(India) Mahesh Bhupathi (Belarus) Max Mirnyi	6–3, 7–5, 6–0
2003	(India) Mahesh Bhupathi (Belarus) Max Mirnyi	(Zimbabwe) Wayne Black (Zimbabwe) Kevin Ullyett	6–2, 2–6, 6–3
2004	(The Bahamas) Mark Knowles (2) (Canada) Daniel Nestor (2)	(United States) Bob Bryan (United States) Mike Bryan	6–3, 6–4
2005	(The Bahamas) Mark Knowles (3) (Canada) Daniel Nestor (3)	(India) Leander Paes (Serbia and Montenegro) Nenad Zimonjić	3–6, 6–3, 6–2
2006	(United States) Bob Bryan (United States) Mike Bryan	(The Bahamas) Mark Knowles (Canada) Daniel Nestor	7–5, 6–4
2007	(United States) Bob Bryan (2) (United States) Mike Bryan (2)	(Poland) Mariusz Fyrstenberg (Poland) Marcin Matkowski	6–3, 7–6^{(7–4)}
2008	(Poland) Mariusz Fyrstenberg (Poland) Marcin Matkowski	(India) Mahesh Bhupathi (The Bahamas) Mark Knowles	6–4, 6–2
↓ Clay court Era ↓
2009	(Canada) Daniel Nestor (4) (Serbia) Nenad Zimonjić	(Sweden) Simon Aspelin (South Africa) Wesley Moodie	6–4, 6–4
2010	(United States) Bob Bryan (3) (United States) Mike Bryan (3)	(Canada) Daniel Nestor (Serbia) Nenad Zimonjić	6–3, 6–4
2011	(United States) Bob Bryan (4) (United States) Mike Bryan (4)	(France) Michaël Llodra (Serbia) Nenad Zimonjić	6–3, 6–3
2012	(Poland) Mariusz Fyrstenberg (2) (Poland) Marcin Matkowski (2)	(Sweden) Robert Lindstedt (Romania) Horia Tecău	6–3, 6–4
2013	(United States) Bob Bryan (5) (United States) Mike Bryan (5)	(Austria) Alexander Peya (Brazil) Bruno Soares	6–2, 6–3
2014	(Canada) Daniel Nestor (5) (Serbia) Nenad Zimonjić (2)	(United States) Bob Bryan (United States) Mike Bryan	6–4, 6–2
2015	(India) Rohan Bopanna (Romania) Florin Mergea	(Poland) Marcin Matkowski (Serbia) Nenad Zimonjić	6–2, 6–7^{(5–7)}, [11–9]
2016	(Netherlands) Jean-Julien Rojer (Romania) Horia Tecău	(India) Rohan Bopanna (Romania) Florin Mergea	6–4, 7–6^{(7–5)}
2017	(Poland) Łukasz Kubot (Brazil) Marcelo Melo	(France) Nicolas Mahut (France) Édouard Roger-Vasselin	7–5, 6–3
2018	(Croatia) Nikola Mektić (Austria) Alexander Peya	(United States) Bob Bryan (United States) Mike Bryan	5–3 (ret.)
2019	(Netherlands) Jean-Julien Rojer (2) (Romania) Horia Tecău (2)	(Argentina) Diego Schwartzman (Austria) Dominic Thiem	6–2, 6–3
2020	Cancelled due to the COVID-19 pandemic		
2021	(Spain) Marcel Granollers (Argentina) Horacio Zeballos	(Croatia) Nikola Mektić (Croatia) Mate Pavić	1–6, 6–3, [10–8]
2022	(Netherlands) Wesley Koolhof (United Kingdom) Neal Skupski	(Colombia) Juan Sebastián Cabal (Colombia) Robert Farah	6–7^{(4–7)}, 6–4, [10–5]
2023	Karen Khachanov; Andrey Rublev	(India) Rohan Bopanna (Australia) Matthew Ebden	6–3, 3–6, [10–3]
2024	(United States) Sebastian Korda (Australia) Jordan Thompson	(Uruguay) Ariel Behar (Czech Republic) Adam Pavlásek	6–3, 7–6^{(9–7)}
2025	(Spain) Marcel Granollers (2) (Argentina) Horacio Zeballos (2)	(El Salvador) Marcelo Arévalo (Croatia) Mate Pavić	6–4, 6–4
2026	(Finland) Harri Heliövaara (United Kingdom) Henry Patten	(Argentina) Guido Andreozzi (France) Manuel Guinard	6–3, 3–6, [10–7]

=== Women ===
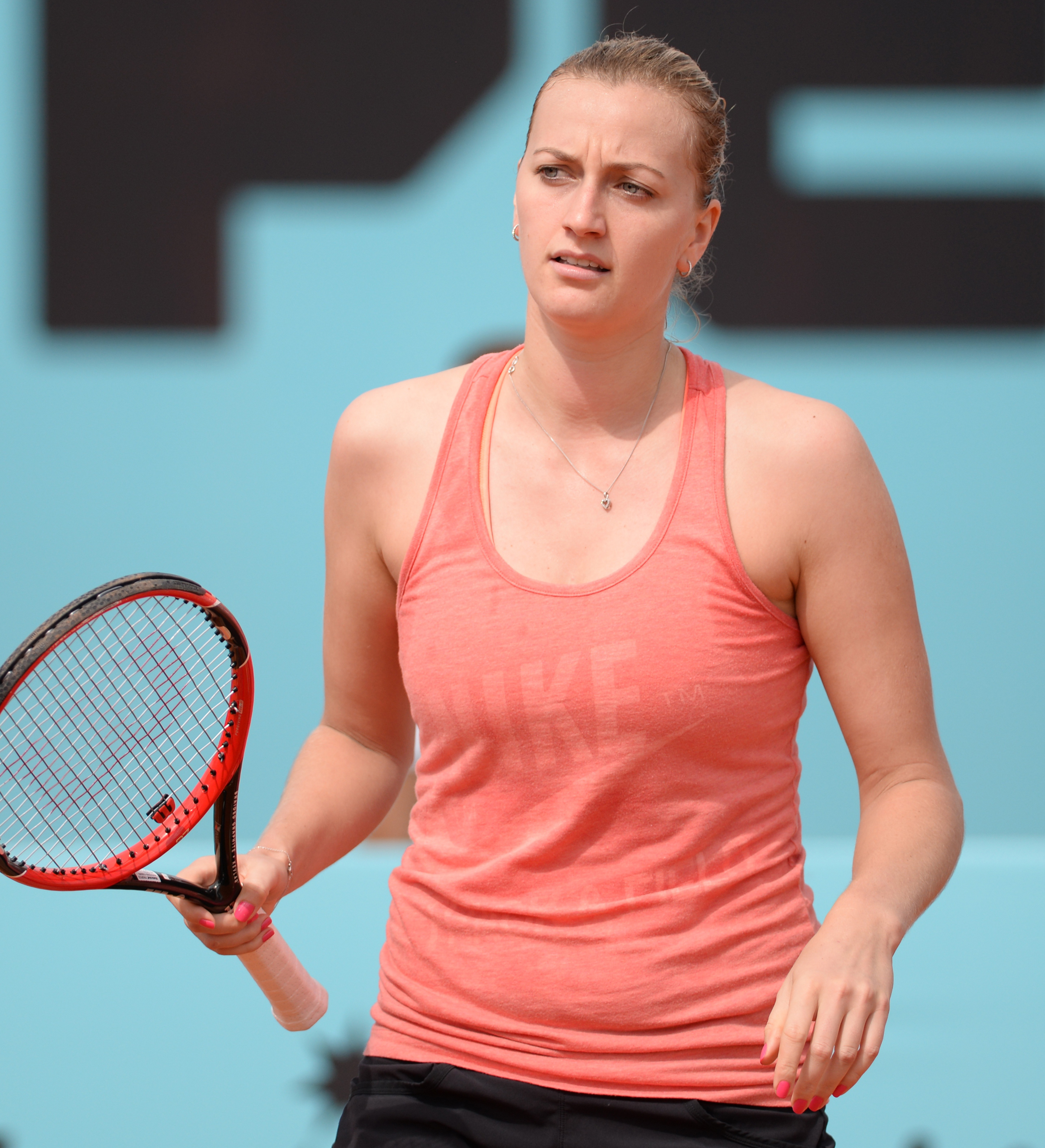
Petra Kvitová (winner in 2011, 2015 & 2018) co-holds the record in Madrid for the most title wins (three).

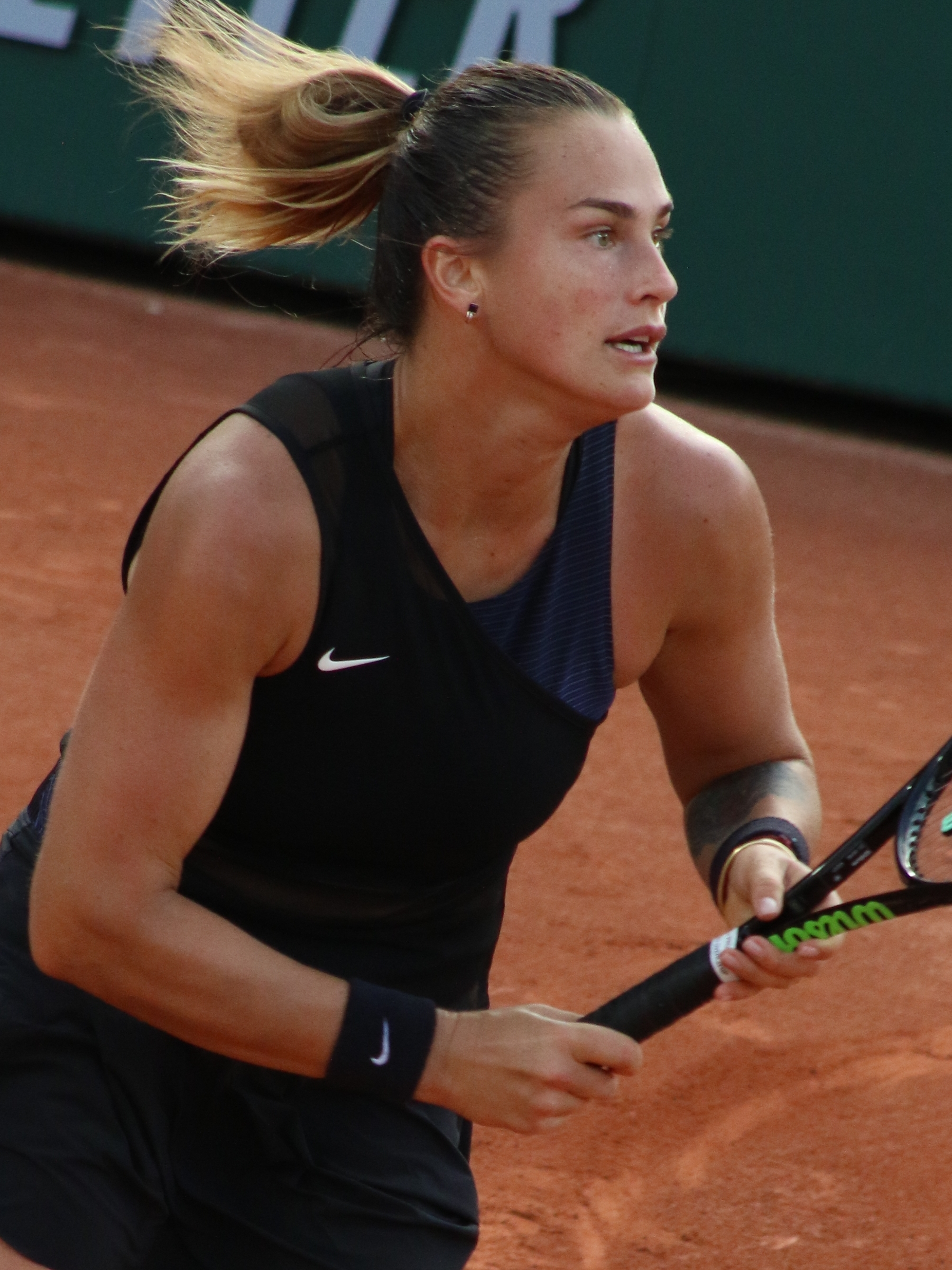
Aryna Sabalenka (winner in 2021, 2023 & 2025) co-holds the record in Madrid for the most title wins (three).

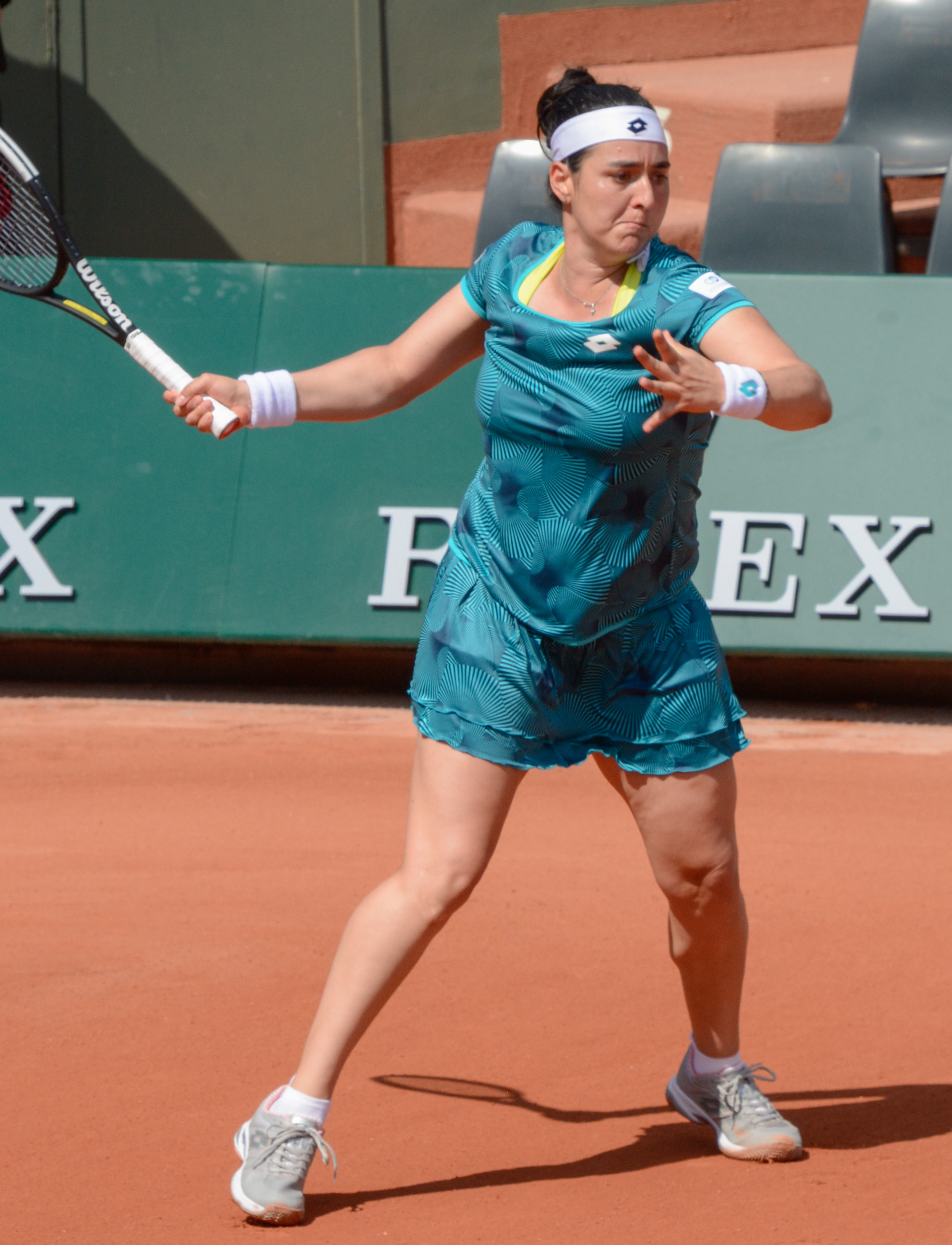
Ons Jabeur the 2022 champion, becoming the first African player to win a title at this level.

==== Singles ====
Year	Champions	Runners-up	Score
2009	(Russia) Dinara Safina (1/1)	(Denmark) Caroline Wozniacki	6–2, 6–4
2010	(France) Aravane Rezaï (1/1)	(United States) Venus Williams	6–2, 7–5
2011	(Czech Republic) Petra Kvitová (1/3)	(Belarus) Victoria Azarenka	7–6^{(7–3)}, 6–4
2012	(United States) Serena Williams (1/2)	(Belarus) Victoria Azarenka	6–1, 6–3
2013	(United States) Serena Williams (2/2)	(Russia) Maria Sharapova	6–1, 6–4
2014	(Russia) Maria Sharapova (1/1)	(Romania) Simona Halep	1–6, 6–2, 6–3
2015	(Czech Republic) Petra Kvitová (2/3)	(Russia) Svetlana Kuznetsova	6–1, 6–2
2016	(Romania) Simona Halep (1/2)	(Slovakia) Dominika Cibulková	6–2, 6–4
2017	(Romania) Simona Halep (2/2)	(France) Kristina Mladenovic	7–5, 6–7^{(5–7)}, 6–2
2018	(Czech Republic) Petra Kvitová (3/3)	(Netherlands) Kiki Bertens	7–6^{(8–6)}, 4–6, 6–3
2019	(Netherlands) Kiki Bertens (1/1)	(Romania) Simona Halep	6–4, 6–4
2020	Cancelled due to the COVID-19 pandemic		
2021	(Belarus) Aryna Sabalenka (1/3)	(Australia) Ashleigh Barty	6–0, 3–6, 6–4
2022	(Tunisia) Ons Jabeur (1/1)	(United States) Jessica Pegula	7–5, 0–6, 6–2
2023	Aryna Sabalenka (2/3)	(Poland) Iga Świątek	6–3, 3–6, 6–3
2024	(Poland) Iga Świątek (1/1)	Aryna Sabalenka	7–5, 4–6, 7–6^{(9–7)}
2025	Aryna Sabalenka (3/3)	(United States) Coco Gauff	6–3, 7–6^{(7–3)}
2026	(Ukraine) Marta Kostyuk (1/1)	Mirra Andreeva	6–3, 7–5

==== Doubles ====
Year	Champions	Runners-up	Score
2009	(Zimbabwe) Cara Black (United States) Liezel Huber	(Czech Republic) Květa Peschke (United States) Lisa Raymond	4–6, 6–3, [10–6]
2010	(United States) Serena Williams (United States) Venus Williams	(Argentina) Gisela Dulko (Italy) Flavia Pennetta	6–2, 7–5
2011	(Belarus) Victoria Azarenka (Russia) Maria Kirilenko	(Czech Republic) Květa Peschke (Slovenia) Katarina Srebotnik	6–4, 6–3
2012	(Italy) Sara Errani (Italy) Roberta Vinci	(Russia) Ekaterina Makarova (Russia) Elena Vesnina	6–1, 3–6, [10–4]
2013	(Russia) Anastasia Pavlyuchenkova (Czech Republic) Lucie Šafářová	(Zimbabwe) Cara Black (New Zealand) Marina Erakovic	6–2, 6–4
2014	(Italy) Sara Errani (2) (Italy) Roberta Vinci (2)	(Spain) Garbiñe Muguruza (Spain) Carla Suárez Navarro	6–4, 6–3
2015	(Australia) Casey Dellacqua (Kazakhstan) Yaroslava Shvedova	(Spain) Garbiñe Muguruza (Spain) Carla Suárez Navarro	6–3, 6–7^{(4–7)}, [10–5]
2016	(France) Caroline Garcia (France) Kristina Mladenovic	(Switzerland) Martina Hingis (India) Sania Mirza	6–4, 6–4
2017	(Chinese Taipei) Chan Yung-jan (Switzerland) Martina Hingis	(Hungary) Tímea Babos (Czech Republic) Andrea Hlaváčková	6–4, 6–3
2018	(Russia) Ekaterina Makarova (Russia) Elena Vesnina	(Hungary) Tímea Babos (France) Kristina Mladenovic	2–6, 6–4, [10–8]
2019	(Chinese Taipei) Hsieh Su-wei (Czech Republic) Barbora Strýcová	(Canada) Gabriela Dabrowski (China) Xu Yifan	6–3, 6–1
2020	Cancelled due to the COVID-19 pandemic		
2021	(Czech Republic) Barbora Krejčíková (Czech Republic) Kateřina Siniaková	(Canada) Gabriela Dabrowski (Netherlands) Demi Schuurs	6–4, 6–3
2022	(Canada) Gabriela Dabrowski (Mexico) Giuliana Olmos	(United States) Desirae Krawczyk (Netherlands) Demi Schuurs	7–6^{(7–1)}, 5–7, [10–7]
2023	Victoria Azarenka (2) (Brazil) Beatriz Haddad Maia	(United States) Coco Gauff (United States) Jessica Pegula	6–1, 6–4
2024	(Spain) Cristina Bucsa (Spain) Sara Sorribes Tormo	(Czech Republic) Barbora Krejčíková (Germany) Laura Siegemund	6–0, 6–2
2025	(Romania) Sorana Cîrstea; Anna Kalinskaya	Veronika Kudermetova (Belgium) Elise Mertens	6–7^{(10–12)}, 6–2, [12–10]
2026	(Czech Republic) Kateřina Siniaková (2) (United States) Taylor Townsend	Mirra Andreeva; Diana Shnaider	7–6^{(7–2)}, 6–2

== Records ==
Most titles
	Player(s)	Record	Year(s)
Men's singles	(Spain) Rafael Nadal	5	2005, 2010, 2013–14, 2017
Women's singles	(Czech Republic) Petra Kvitová	3	2011, 2015, 2018
Women's singles	(Belarus) Aryna Sabalenka	3	2021, 2023, 2025
Men's doubles	(United States) Bob Bryan (United States) Mike Bryan	5	2006–07, 2010–11, 2013
Men's doubles	(Canada) Daniel Nestor (Note: Daniel Nestor won these titles with two different partners; Mark Knowles and Nenad Zimonjić.)	5	2002, 2004–05, 2009, 2014
Women's doubles	(Italy) Sara Errani (Italy) Roberta Vinci	2	2012, 2014
Women's doubles	(Belarus) Victoria Azarenka (Note: Victoria Azarenka won these titles with two different partners; Maria Kirilenko and Beatriz Haddad Maia.)	2	2011, 2023
Most finals
Men's singles	(Spain) Rafael Nadal	8	2005, 2009–11, 2013–15, 2017
Women's singles	(Romania) Simona Halep	4	2014, 2016–17, 2019
Women's singles	(Belarus) Aryna Sabalenka	4	2021, 2023–25
Most consecutive titles
Men's singles	(Spain) Rafael Nadal	2	2013–14
Men's singles	(Spain) Carlos Alcaraz	2	2022–23
Men's doubles	(The Bahamas) Mark Knowles (Canada) Daniel Nestor	2	2004–05
Men's doubles	(United States) Bob Bryan (United States) Mike Bryan	2	2006–07, 2010–11
Women's singles	(United States) Serena Williams	2	2012–13
Women's singles	(Romania) Simona Halep	2	2016–17
Most consecutive finals
Men's singles	(Spain) Rafael Nadal	3	2009–11, 2013–15
Women's singles	(Belarus) Aryna Sabalenka	3	2023–25

== See also ==
- Madrid Tennis Grand Prix
- WTA Madrid Open
