= 2016 Mutua Madrid Open – Women's doubles =

Women's doubles
- 2016 Mutua Madrid Open

Final
- Champions: (France) Caroline Garcia (France) Kristina Mladenovic
- Runners-up: (Switzerland) Martina Hingis (India) Sania Mirza
- Score: 6–4, 6–4

Events
Singles	men	women
Doubles	men	women
← 2015 ·	Mutua Madrid Open	· 2017 →

Casey Dellacqua and Yaroslava Shvedova were the defending champions, but Dellacqua chose not to participate this year as she welcomed her second child. Shvedova played alongside Tímea Babos, but lost in the quarterfinals to Caroline Garcia and Kristina Mladenovic.
Garcia and Mladenovic went on to win the title, defeating Martina Hingis and Sania Mirza in the final, 6–4, 6–4.

== Seeds ==
The top four seeds received a bye into the second round.

1. (Switzerland) Martina Hingis / (India) Sania Mirza (final)
2. (United States) Bethanie Mattek-Sands / (Czech Republic) Lucie Šafářová (withdrew)
3. (Hungary) Tímea Babos / (Kazakhstan) Yaroslava Shvedova (quarterfinals)
4. (Chinese Taipei) Chan Hao-ching / (Chinese Taipei) Chan Yung-jan (quarterfinals)
5. (France) Caroline Garcia / (France) Kristina Mladenovic (champions)
6. (Czech Republic) Andrea Hlaváčková / (Czech Republic) Lucie Hradecká (quarterfinals)
7. (Spain) Garbiñe Muguruza / (Spain) Carla Suárez Navarro (second round, withdrew)
8. (Russia) Ekaterina Makarova / (Russia) Elena Vesnina (semifinals)

== Draw ==
=== Key ===
- Q = Qualifier
- WC = Wild card
- LL = Lucky loser
- Alt = Alternate
- SE = Special exempt
- PR = Protected ranking
- ITF = ITF entry
- JE = Junior exempt
- w/o = Walkover
- r = Retired
- d = Defaulted
- SR = Special ranking

=== Finals ===
Semifinals
1	(Switzerland) Martina Hingis (India) Sania Mirza	6	6
(United States) Vania King (Russia) Alla Kudryavtseva	2	0
5	(France) Caroline Garcia (France) Kristina Mladenovic	6	6
8	(Russia) Ekaterina Makarova (Russia) Elena Vesnina	2	3

Final
1	(Switzerland) Martina Hingis (India) Sania Mirza	4	4
5	(France) Caroline Garcia (France) Kristina Mladenovic	6	6

=== Top half ===
First round
(Romania) I-C Begu (Romania) M Niculescu	6	4	[8]
(Chinese Taipei) C-j Chuang (Croatia) D Jurak	2	6	[10]
(Spain) A Medina Garrigues (Spain) A Parra Santonja	4	6	[10]
WC	(Spain) P Badosa Gibert (Spain) MJ Martínez Sánchez	6	3	[7]
(Ukraine) K Bondarenko (Ukraine) O Savchuk	4	6^{1}
6	(Czech Republic) A Hlaváčková (Czech Republic) L Hradecká	6	7^{7}
(Russia) M Gasparyan (Czech Republic) K Siniaková	5	6	[10]
WC	(Czech Republic) K Peschke (Czech Republic) B Strýcová	7	2	[6]
(Germany) J Görges (Czech Republic) Ka Plíšková	4	2
(United States) V King (Russia) A Kudryavtseva	6	6
(Canada) G Dabrowski (Australia) An Rodionova	4	6^{4}
7	(Spain) G Muguruza (Spain) C Suárez Navarro	6	7^{7}

Second round
1	(Switzerland) M Hingis (India) S Mirza	6	6
(Chinese Taipei) C-j Chuang (Croatia) D Jurak	0	4
(Spain) A Medina Garrigues (Spain) A Parra Santonja	6	1	[7]
6	(Czech Republic) A Hlaváčková (Czech Republic) L Hradecká	2	6	[10]
4	(Chinese Taipei) H-c Chan (Chinese Taipei) Y-j Chan	6	6
(Russia) M Gasparyan (Czech Republic) K Siniaková	3	2
(United States) V King (Russia) A Kudryavtseva	w/o
7	(Spain) G Muguruza (Spain) C Suárez Navarro

Quarterfinals
1	(Switzerland) M Hingis (India) S Mirza	6	6
6	(Czech Republic) A Hlaváčková (Czech Republic) L Hradecká	3	2
4	(Chinese Taipei) H-c Chan (Chinese Taipei) Y-j Chan	6	4	[9]
(United States) V King (Russia) A Kudryavtseva	2	6	[11]

Semifinals
1	(Switzerland) M Hingis (India) S Mirza	6	6
(United States) V King (Russia) A Kudryavtseva	2	0

=== Bottom half ===
First round
5	(France) C Garcia (France) K Mladenovic	6	7
(Germany) A-L Grönefeld (United States) C Vandeweghe	4	5
(China) Y Xu (China) S Zheng	2
(Russia) D Kasatkina (Germany) L Siegemund	1^{r}
(Chinese Taipei) S-w Hsieh (Georgia (country)) O Kalashnikova	4	3
(Spain) L Arruabarrena (Italy) S Errani	6	6
8	(Russia) E Makarova (Russia) E Vesnina	6^{4}	6	[10]
(United States) R Atawo (United States) A Spears	7^{7}	4	[5]
(Slovenia) A Klepač (Slovenia) K Srebotnik	6	7
WC	(Spain) S Soler Espinosa (Spain) S Sorribes Tormo	0	5
(Argentina) M Irigoyen (China) C Liang	2	4
WC	(Russia) S Kuznetsova (Russia) A Pavlyuchenkova	6	6

Second round
5	(France) C Garcia (France) K Mladenovic	6	6
(China) Y Xu (China) S Zheng	1	3
(Spain) L Arruabarrena (Italy) S Errani	3	3
3	(Hungary) T Babos (Kazakhstan) Y Shvedova	6	6
8	(Russia) E Makarova (Russia) E Vesnina	6	2	[10]
(Slovenia) A Klepač (Slovenia) K Srebotnik	3	6	[7]
WC	(Russia) S Kuznetsova (Russia) A Pavlyuchenkova	6	6
Alt	(Romania) R Olaru (Poland) A Rosolska	3	4

Quarterfinals
5	(France) C Garcia (France) K Mladenovic	6	6
3	(Hungary) T Babos (Kazakhstan) Y Shvedova	4	3
8	(Russia) E Makarova (Russia) E Vesnina	w/o
WC	(Russia) S Kuznetsova (Russia) A Pavlyuchenkova

Semifinals
5	(France) C Garcia (France) K Mladenovic	6	6
8	(Russia) E Makarova (Russia) E Vesnina	2	3
