= 2014 Mutua Madrid Open – Women's doubles =

Women's doubles
- 2014 Mutua Madrid Open

Final
- Champions: (Italy) Sara Errani (Italy) Roberta Vinci
- Runners-up: (Spain) Garbiñe Muguruza (Spain) Carla Suárez Navarro
- Score: 6–4, 6–3

Details
- Draw: 28
- Seeds: 8

Events
Singles	men	women
Doubles	men	women
- Mutua Madrid Open

Anastasia Pavlyuchenkova and Lucie Šafářová were the defending champions, but lost in the quarterfinals to Anabel Medina Garrigues and Yaroslava Shvedova.
Sara Errani and Roberta Vinci won the title, defeating Garbiñe Muguruza and Carla Suárez Navarro in the final, 6–4, 6–3.

== Seeds ==
1. (Chinese Taipei) Hsieh Su-wei / (China) Peng Shuai (semifinals)
2. (Italy) Sara Errani / (Italy) Roberta Vinci (champions)
3. (Russia) Ekaterina Makarova / (Russia) Elena Vesnina (second round)
4. (Czech Republic) Květa Peschke / (Slovenia) Katarina Srebotnik (second round)
5. (Zimbabwe) Cara Black / (India) Sania Mirza (quarterfinals)
6. (United States) Raquel Kops-Jones / (United States) Abigail Spears (quarterfinals)
7. (Russia) Alla Kudryavtseva / (Australia) Anastasia Rodionova (first round)
8. (Germany) Julia Görges / (Germany) Anna-Lena Grönefeld (second round)

== Draw ==
Key

- Q = Qualifier
- WC = Wild card
- LL = Lucky loser
- Alt = Alternate
- ITF = ITF entry
- PR = Protected ranking
- SR = Special ranking
- SE = Special exempt
- JE = Junior exempt
- JR = Junior Accelerator Programme entrant
- CO = College Accelerator Programme entrant
- NG = Next Gen Accelerator Program entrant
- w/o = Walkover
- r = Retired
- d = Defaulted

=== Finals ===
Semifinals
1	(Chinese Taipei) Hsieh Su-wei (China) Peng Shuai	7	3	[8]
WC	(Spain) Garbiñe Muguruza (Spain) Carla Suárez Navarro	5	6	[10]
(Spain) Anabel Medina Garrigues (Kazakhstan) Yaroslava Shvedova	6^{7}	6	[8]
2	(Italy) Sara Errani (Italy) Roberta Vinci	7^{9}	2	[10]

Final
WC	(Spain) Garbiñe Muguruza (Spain) Carla Suárez Navarro	4	3
2	(Italy) Sara Errani (Italy) Roberta Vinci	6	6

=== Top half ===
First round
(United States) V Lepchenko (Czech Republic) V Uhlířová	1	2
WC	(Italy) F Schiavone (Spain) S Soler Espinosa	6	6
WC	(Switzerland) B Bencic (Russia) M Kirilenko
(Chinese Taipei) H-c Chan (South Africa) C Scheepers	w/o
(Canada) G Dabrowski (Poland) A Rosolska	1	7	[7]
5	(Zimbabwe) C Black (India) S Mirza	6	5	[10]
(United States) L Huber (United States) L Raymond	2	6^{1}
WC	(Spain) G Muguruza (Spain) C Suárez Navarro	6	7^{7}
(Romania) I-C Begu (Georgia (country)) O Kalashnikova	4	3
(Czech Republic) K Koukalová (Romania) M Niculescu	6	6
(Croatia) D Jurak (United States) M Moulton-Levy	2	5
6	(United States) R Kops-Jones (United States) A Spears	6	7

Second round
1	(Chinese Taipei) S-w Hsieh (China) S Peng	6	6
WC	(Italy) F Schiavone (Spain) S Soler Espinosa	4	2
(Chinese Taipei) H-c Chan (South Africa) C Scheepers	4	1
5	(Zimbabwe) C Black (India) S Mirza	6	6
4	(Czech Republic) K Peschke (Slovenia) K Srebotnik	5	2
WC	(Spain) G Muguruza (Spain) C Suárez Navarro	7	6
(Czech Republic) K Koukalová (Romania) M Niculescu	4	1
6	(United States) R Kops-Jones (United States) A Spears	6	6

Quarterfinals
1	(Chinese Taipei) S-w Hsieh (China) S Peng	5	6	[10]
5	(Zimbabwe) C Black (India) S Mirza	7	1	[8]
WC	(Spain) G Muguruza (Spain) C Suárez Navarro	2	7	[10]
6	(United States) R Kops-Jones (United States) A Spears	6	5	[8]

Semifinals
1	(Chinese Taipei) S-w Hsieh (China) S Peng	7	3	[8]
WC	(Spain) G Muguruza (Spain) C Suárez Navarro	5	6	[10]

=== Bottom half ===
First round
7	(Russia) A Kudryavtseva (Australia) A Rodionova	6	2	[6]
(Switzerland) M Hingis (Germany) S Lisicki	3	6	[10]
(France) K Mladenovic (Italy) F Pennetta	3	5
(Russia) A Pavlyuchenkova (Czech Republic) L Šafářová	6	7
(Spain) A Medina Garrigues (Kazakhstan) Y Shvedova	6	6
(Slovakia) D Hantuchová (Spain) A Parra Santonja	3	3
8	(Germany) J Görges (Germany) A-L Grönefeld	6	6
(Slovakia) J Husárová (China) S Zhang	3	4
WC	(Germany) A Petkovic (United States) S Stephens	6	2	[4]
(United States) V King (China) J Zheng	1	6	[10]
(France) C Garcia (Poland) K Jans-Ignacik	2	1
(Russia) S Kuznetsova (Australia) S Stosur	6	6

Second round
(Switzerland) M Hingis (Germany) S Lisicki	2	3
(Russia) A Pavlyuchenkova (Czech Republic) L Šafářová	6	6
(Spain) A Medina Garrigues (Kazakhstan) Y Shvedova	6	6
3	(Russia) E Makarova (Russia) E Vesnina	2	2
8	(Germany) J Görges (Germany) A-L Grönefeld	6	6^{5}	[8]
(United States) V King (China) J Zheng	1	7^{7}	[10]
(Russia) S Kuznetsova (Australia) S Stosur	3	1
2	(Italy) S Errani (Italy) R Vinci	6	6

Quarterfinals
(Russia) A Pavlyuchenkova (Czech Republic) L Šafářová	4	2
(Spain) A Medina Garrigues (Kazakhstan) Y Shvedova	6	6
(United States) V King (China) J Zheng	5	3
2	(Italy) S Errani (Italy) R Vinci	7	6

Semifinals
(Spain) A Medina Garrigues (Kazakhstan) Y Shvedova	6^{7}	6	[8]
2	(Italy) S Errani (Italy) R Vinci	7^{9}	2	[10]
