= 2014 Mutua Madrid Open – Women's singles =

Women's singles
- 2014 Mutua Madrid Open

Final
- Champion: (Russia) Maria Sharapova
- Runner-up: (Romania) Simona Halep
- Score: 1–6, 6–2, 6–3

Details
- Draw: 64
- Seeds: 16

Events
Singles	men	women
Doubles	men	women
- Mutua Madrid Open

Maria Sharapova defeated Simona Halep in the final, 1–6, 6–2, 6–3 to win the women's singles tennis title at the 2014 Madrid Open.

Serena Williams was the two-time defending champion, but withdrew before her quarterfinal match because of a left thigh injury.

== Seeds ==
1. (United States) Serena Williams (quarterfinals, withdrew because of a left thigh injury)
2. (China) Li Na (quarterfinals)
3. (Poland) Agnieszka Radwańska (semifinals)
4. (Romania) Simona Halep (final)
5. (Czech Republic) Petra Kvitová (semifinals)
6. (Serbia) Jelena Janković (second round)
7. (Germany) Angelique Kerber (first round, retired because of a lower back injury)
8. (Russia) Maria Sharapova (champion)
9. (Slovakia) Dominika Cibulková (first round)
10. (Italy) Sara Errani (third round)
11. (Serbia) Ana Ivanovic (quarterfinals)
12. (Italy) Flavia Pennetta (first round)
13. (Denmark) Caroline Wozniacki (second round)
14. (Spain) Carla Suárez Navarro (third round)
15. (Germany) Sabine Lisicki (third round)
16. (United States) Sloane Stephens (third round)

Click on the seed number of a player to go to their draw section.

== Draw ==
Key

- Q = Qualifier
- WC = Wild card
- LL = Lucky loser
- Alt = Alternate
- ITF = ITF entry
- PR = Protected ranking
- SR = Special ranking
- SE = Special exempt
- JE = Junior exempt
- JR = Junior Accelerator Programme entrant
- CO = College Accelerator Programme entrant
- NG = Next Gen Accelerator Program entrant
- w/o = Walkover
- r = Retired
- d = Defaulted

=== Finals ===
Quarterfinals
1	(United States) Serena Williams
5	(Czech Republic) Petra Kvitová	w/o
4	(Romania) Simona Halep	6	6
11	(Serbia) Ana Ivanovic	2	2
Q	(France) Caroline Garcia	4	6	4
3	(Poland) Agnieszka Radwańska	6	4	6
8	(Russia) Maria Sharapova	2	7^{7}	6
2	(China) Li Na	6	6^{5}	3

Semifinals
5	(Czech Republic) Petra Kvitová	7^{7}	3	2
4	(Romania) Simona Halep	6^{4}	6	6
3	(Poland) Agnieszka Radwańska	1	4
8	(Russia) Maria Sharapova	6	6

Final
4	(Romania) Simona Halep	6	2	3
8	(Russia) Maria Sharapova	1	6	6

=== Top half ===
==== Section 1 ====
First round
1	(United States) S Williams	6	6
Q	(Switzerland) B Bencic	2	1
(China) S Peng	6	6
(Japan) K Nara	2	3
(Estonia) K Kanepi	7^{9}	1	2
(United States) A Riske	6^{7}	6	6
(Austria) Y Meusburger	6^{6}	4
14	(Spain) C Suárez Navarro	7^{8}	6
12	(Italy) F Pennetta	6	0	3
(Czech Republic) L Šafářová	1	6	6
(Slovakia) M Rybáriková	6	7
(Germany) A Beck	2	5
WC	(Spain) A Medina Garrigues	4	6	4
(United States) V Lepchenko	6	4	6
(Romania) S Cîrstea	1	7	6^{4}
5	(Czech Republic) P Kvitová	6	5	7^{7}

Second round
1	(United States) S Williams	6	6
(China) S Peng	2	3
(United States) A Riske	2	4
14	(Spain) C Suárez Navarro	6	6
(Czech Republic) L Šafářová	6	6
(Slovakia) M Rybáriková	1	2
(United States) V Lepchenko	6	2	1
5	(Czech Republic) P Kvitová	2	6	6

Third round
1	(United States) S Williams	6	6
14	(Spain) C Suárez Navarro	2	3
(Czech Republic) L Šafářová	4	3
5	(Czech Republic) P Kvitová	6	6

Quarterfinals
1	(United States) S Williams
5	(Czech Republic) P Kvitová	w/o

==== Section 2 ====
First round
4	(Romania) S Halep	6	6
Q	(Germany) J Görges	2	0
WC	(Spain) L Arruabarrena	6	6
(Bulgaria) T Pironkova	3	4
(China) S Zhang	4	5
WC	(Romania) I-C Begu	6	7
Q	(Czech Republic) Ka Plíšková	2	7^{7}	3
15	(Germany) S Lisicki	6	6^{5}	6
11	(Serbia) A Ivanovic	6	7^{7}
(United States) M Keys	1	6^{4}
(Italy) K Knapp	1	1
(Serbia) B Jovanovski	6	6
WC	(Spain) MT Torró Flor	4	6	1
(Russia) A Pavlyuchenkova	6	4	6
(Ukraine) E Svitolina	4	3
6	(Serbia) J Janković	6	6

Second round
4	(Romania) S Halep	6	6
WC	(Spain) L Arruabarrena	4	4
WC	(Romania) I-C Begu	3	4
15	(Germany) S Lisicki	6	6
11	(Serbia) A Ivanovic	6	6
(Serbia) B Jovanovski	4	2
(Russia) A Pavlyuchenkova	6	5	7^{7}
6	(Serbia) J Janković	2	7	6^{3}

Third round
4	(Romania) S Halep	5	6	6
15	(Germany) S Lisicki	7	3	2
11	(Serbia) A Ivanovic	6	6
(Russia) A Pavlyuchenkova	1	2

Quarterfinals
4	(Romania) S Halep	6	6
11	(Serbia) A Ivanovic	2	2

=== Bottom half ===
==== Section 3 ====
First round
7	(Germany) A Kerber	3	0^{r}
Q	(France) C Garcia	6	2
Q	(France) K Mladenovic	4	5
(Russia) M Kirilenko	6	7
(Italy) F Schiavone	6	6^{3}	6
(Russia) E Vesnina	4	7^{7}	4
(Germany) A Petkovic	5	1
10	(Italy) S Errani	7	6
13	(Denmark) C Wozniacki	6	6
(Russia) E Makarova	2	2
(Slovakia) D Hantuchová	4	4
(Italy) R Vinci	6	6
(Russia) S Kuznetsova	6	4	6
(France) A Cornet	3	6	1
(Canada) E Bouchard	6^{3}	2
3	(Poland) A Radwańska	7^{7}	6

Second round
Q	(France) C Garcia	w/o
(Russia) M Kirilenko
(Italy) F Schiavone	3	1
10	(Italy) S Errani	6	6
13	(Denmark) C Wozniacki	3	3
(Italy) R Vinci	6	6
(Russia) S Kuznetsova	3	6	6^{6}
3	(Poland) A Radwańska	6	4	7^{8}

Third round
Q	(France) C Garcia	6	4	6
10	(Italy) S Errani	2	6	3
(Italy) R Vinci	1	1
3	(Poland) A Radwańska	6	6

Quarterfinals
Q	(France) C Garcia	4	6	4
3	(Poland) A Radwańska	6	4	6

==== Section 4 ====
First round
8	(Russia) M Sharapova	6	6
(Czech Republic) K Koukalová	1	2
(United States) C McHale	7^{7}	6
(United States) L Davis	6^{2}	3
(Spain) G Muguruza	6^{4}	6	7^{7}
WC	(Spain) S Soler Espinosa	7^{7}	3	6^{2}
(Australia) S Stosur	6	6
9	(Slovakia) D Cibulková	4	0
16	(United States) S Stephens	2	6	6
Q	(Romania) M Niculescu	6	3	2
Q	(Czech Republic) P Cetkovská	6	6
(Switzerland) S Vögele	1	3
(China) J Zheng	7^{7}	6
Q	(Colombia) M Duque Mariño	6^{5}	2
(Belgium) K Flipkens	1	6^{7}
2	(China) N Li	6	7^{9}

Second round
8	(Russia) M Sharapova	6	4	6
(United States) C McHale	1	6	4
(Spain) G Muguruza	5	6	1
(Australia) S Stosur	7	3	6
16	(United States) S Stephens	6	2	6
Q	(Czech Republic) P Cetkovská	4	6	3
(China) J Zheng	2	3
2	(China) N Li	6	6

Third round
8	(Russia) M Sharapova	6	6
(Australia) S Stosur	4	3
16	(United States) S Stephens	6	3	2
2	(China) N Li	2	6	6

Quarterfinals
8	(Russia) M Sharapova	2	7^{7}	6
2	(China) N Li	6	6^{5}	3

== Qualifying ==
=== Seeds ===
1. (France) Caroline Garcia (qualified)
2. (Slovakia) Jana Čepelová (qualifying competition)
3. (Italy) Camila Giorgi (qualifying competition)
4. (Puerto Rico) Monica Puig (first round)
5. (United States) Vania King (first round)
6. (Czech Republic) Karolína Plíšková (qualified)
7. (Kazakhstan) Yaroslava Shvedova (first round)
8. (Croatia) Donna Vekić (qualifying competition)
9. (Argentina) Paula Ormaechea (first round)
10. (Poland) Urszula Radwańska (first round)
11. (Romania) Alexandra Cadanțu (first round, retired)
12. (France) Virginie Razzano (first round)
13. (Croatia) Ajla Tomljanović (first round)
14. (Austria) Patricia Mayr-Achleitner (qualifying competition, retired)
15. (Romania) Monica Niculescu (qualified)
16. (South Africa) Chanelle Scheepers (first round)

=== Qualifiers ===
1. (France) Caroline Garcia
2. (Romania) Monica Niculescu
3. (Switzerland) Belinda Bencic
4. (Czech Republic) Petra Cetkovská
5. (Germany) Julia Görges
6. (Czech Republic) Karolína Plíšková
7. (Colombia) Mariana Duque Mariño
8. (France) Kristina Mladenovic

=== Draw ===
==== First qualifier ====
First round
1	(France) Caroline Garcia	6	6
WC	(Spain) Sara Sorribes Tormo	3	2
WC	(Spain) Laura Pous Tió	6	2	6
10	(Poland) Urszula Radwańska	3	6	4

Qualifying competition
1	(France) Caroline Garcia	6	6
WC	(Spain) Laura Pous Tió	3	3

==== Second qualifier ====
First round
2	(Slovakia) Jana Čepelová	6	7
(Belarus) Olga Govortsova	3	5
WC	(Romania) Alexandra Dulgheru	5	5
15	(Romania) Monica Niculescu	7	7

Qualifying competition
2	(Slovakia) Jana Čepelová	0	1
15	(Romania) Monica Niculescu	6	6

==== Third qualifier ====
First round
3	(Italy) Camila Giorgi	4	6	7^{11}
(Russia) Alla Kudryavtseva	6	4	6^{9}
(Switzerland) Belinda Bencic	6	3
11	(Romania) Alexandra Cadanțu	4	0^{r}

Qualifying competition
3	(Italy) Camila Giorgi	4	5
(Switzerland) Belinda Bencic	6	7

==== Fourth qualifier ====
First round
4	(Puerto Rico) Monica Puig	2	6^{3}
(Czech Republic) Petra Cetkovská	6	7^{7}
(Germany) Mona Barthel	6	6
9	(Argentina) Paula Ormaechea	4	3

Qualifying competition
(Czech Republic) Petra Cetkovská	6	6
(Germany) Mona Barthel	4	4

==== Fifth qualifier ====
First round
5	(United States) Vania King	6	1	4
(Germany) Julia Görges	4	6	6
(Poland) Katarzyna Piter	1	7	7^{7}
13	(Croatia) Ajla Tomljanović	6	5	6^{3}

Qualifying competition
(Germany) Julia Görges	6	6
(Poland) Katarzyna Piter	2	3

==== Sixth qualifier ====
First round
6	(Czech Republic) Karolína Plíšková	7	6
WC	(Spain) Olga Sáez Larra	5	3
(Brazil) Teliana Pereira	7^{12}	6
16	(South Africa) Chanelle Scheepers	6^{10}	3

Qualifying competition
6	(Czech Republic) Karolína Plíšková	7^{7}	7^{9}
(Brazil) Teliana Pereira	6^{5}	6^{7}

==== Seventh qualifier ====
First round
7	(Kazakhstan) Yaroslava Shvedova	5	7	6^{7}
(Colombia) Mariana Duque Mariño	7	5	7^{9}
(Russia) Alisa Kleybanova	4	2
14	(Austria) Patricia Mayr-Achleitner	6	6

Qualifying competition
(Colombia) Mariana Duque Mariño	4
14	(Austria) Patricia Mayr-Achleitner	3^{r}

==== Eighth qualifier ====
First round
8	(Croatia) Donna Vekić	1	6	6
(Belgium) Alison Van Uytvanck	6	2	4
(France) Kristina Mladenovic	6	7^{7}
12	(France) Virginie Razzano	3	6^{5}

Qualifying competition
8	(Croatia) Donna Vekić	5	0
(France) Kristina Mladenovic	7	6
