= 2023 Koser Jewelers Tennis Challenge =

Tennis tournament

- Date: 7–13 August 2022
- Edition: 16th
- Category: ITF Women's World Tennis Tour
- Prize money: $100,000
- Surface: Hard / Outdoor
- Location: Landisville, Pennsylvania, United States

Champions

Singles
- (China) Wang Xinyu

Doubles
- (United States) Sophie Chang / (Ukraine) Yulia Starodubtseva
← 2022 ·	Koser Jewelers Tennis Challenge	· 2024 →

The 2023 Koser Jewelers Tennis Challenge was a professional tennis tournament played on outdoor hard courts. It was the sixteenth edition of the tournament which was part of the 2023 ITF Women's World Tennis Tour. It took place in Landisville, Pennsylvania, United States between 7 and 13 August 2023.

== Champions ==
=== Singles ===
- (China) Wang Xinyu def. (United States) Madison Brengle, 6–2, 6–3

=== Doubles ===
- (United States) Sophie Chang / (Ukraine) Yulia Starodubtseva def. (Australia) Olivia Gadecki / (Japan) Mai Hontama, Walkover

== Singles main draw entrants ==
=== Seeds ===
Country	Player	Rank^{1}	Seed
CHN	Wang Xinyu	73	1
SWE	Rebecca Peterson	87	2
USA	Caroline Dolehide	105	3
USA	Madison Brengle	106	4
SUI	Simona Waltert	135	5
AUS	Olivia Gadecki	148	6
	Erika Andreeva	159	7
KOR	Jang Su-jeong	169	8

- ^{1} Rankings are as of 31 July 2023.

=== Other entrants ===
The following players received wildcards into the singles main draw:

- (United States) Sophie Chang
- (United States) Makenna Jones
- (United States) McCartney Kessler
- (United States) Mary Stoiana

The following players received entry from the qualifying draw:

- (United States) Robin Anderson
- (Bosnia and Herzegovina) Nefisa Berberović
- (United States) Allie Kiick
- Veronika Miroshnichenko
- (Ukraine) Hanna Poznikhirenko
- (United States) Madison Sieg
- (United States) Alana Smith
- (India) Sahaja Yamalapalli

The following player received entry as a special exempt:

- (Mexico) Renata Zarazúa
