= 2022 Koser Jewelers Tennis Challenge =

Tennis tournament

- Date: 8–14 August 2022
- Edition: 15th
- Category: ITF Women's World Tennis Tour
- Prize money: $100,000
- Surface: Hard / Outdoor
- Location: Landisville, Pennsylvania, United States

Champions

Singles
- (China) Zhu Lin

Doubles
- (United States) Sophie Chang / (Kazakhstan) Anna Danilina
← 2019 ·	Koser Jewelers Tennis Challenge	· 2023 →

The 2022 Koser Jewelers Tennis Challenge was a professional tennis tournament played on outdoor hard courts. It was the fifteenth edition of the tournament which was part of the 2022 ITF Women's World Tennis Tour. It took place in Landisville, Pennsylvania, United States between 8 and 14 August 2022.

== Champions ==
=== Singles ===
- (China) Zhu Lin def. (United States) Elizabeth Mandlik, 6–2, 6–3

=== Doubles ===
- (United States) Sophie Chang / (Kazakhstan) Anna Danilina def. (South Korea) Han Na-lae / (South Korea) Jang Su-jeong, 2–6, 7–6^{(7–4)}, [11–9]

== Singles main draw entrants ==
=== Seeds ===
Country	Player	Rank^{1}	Seed
CHN	Zhu Lin	97	1
FRA	Kristina Mladenovic	112	2
FRA	Chloé Paquet	114	3
KOR	Jang Su-jeong	122	4
SUI	Simona Waltert	137	5
	Erika Andreeva	139	6
CHN	Yuan Yue	142	7
POL	Katarzyna Kawa	145	8

- ^{1} Rankings are as of 1 August 2022.

=== Other entrants ===
The following players received wildcards into the singles main draw:

- (United States) Nicole Coopersmith
- (United States) Alexa Glatch
- (United States) Elizabeth Mandlik

The following players received entry from the qualifying draw:

- (United States) Makenna Jones
- (Japan) Hiroko Kuwata
- (United States) Maegan Manasse
- (United States) Christina Rosca
- (Japan) Himeno Sakatsume
- (United States) Hibah Shaikh
- Iryna Shymanovich
- (Mexico) Marcela Zacarías

The following player received entry as a lucky loser:

- (United States) Raveena Kingsley
