= 2023 Koser Jewelers Tennis Challenge – Doubles =

Doubles
- 2023 Koser Jewelers Tennis Challenge

Final
- Champions: (United States) Sophie Chang (Ukraine) Yulia Starodubtseva
- Runners-up: (Australia) Olivia Gadecki (Japan) Mai Hontama
- Score: Walkover

Events
Singles	Doubles
← 2022 ·	Koser Jewelers Tennis Challenge	· 2024 →

Sophie Chang and Anna Danilina were the defending champions but Danilina chose to compete at the 2023 National Bank Open instead. Chang partnered alongside Yulia Starodubtseva, and won the tournament after Olivia Gadecki and Mai Hontama withdrew from the final.

== Seeds ==
1. (Georgia (country)) Oksana Kalashnikova / Iryna Shymanovich (first round)
2. (Japan) Eri Hozumi / (Japan) Moyuka Uchijima (first round)
3. (United States) Makenna Jones / (United States) Jamie Loeb (first round)
4. (Australia) Olivia Gadecki / (Japan) Mai Hontama (final, withdrew)

== Draw ==
=== Key ===
- Q = Qualifier
- WC = Wild card
- LL = Lucky loser
- Alt = Alternate
- SE = Special exempt
- PR = Protected ranking
- ITF = ITF entry
- JE = Junior exempt
- w/o = Walkover
- r = Retired
- d = Defaulted
- SR = Special ranking

=== Draw ===
First round
1	(Georgia (country)) O Kalashnikova; I Shymanovich	4	3
(Ukraine) K Volodko (India) S Yamalapalli	6	6
(United States) S Chang (Ukraine) Y Starodubtseva	6	3	[10]
WC	(United States) A Glatch (Ukraine) H Poznikhirenko	1	6	[8]
3	(United States) M Jones (United States) J Loeb	3	6	[8]
M Kozyreva; V Miroshnichenko	6	3	[10]
(United States) J Daniel (United States) M Kessler	6	6^{4}	[11]
(United States) C Beck (United States) C Rosca	2	7^{7}	[9]
(United States) C Corley (United States) I Corley	3	4
(United States) A Lahey (United States) A Smith	6	6
(Mexico) M Zacarías (Mexico) R Zarazúa	3	2
4	(Australia) O Gadecki (Japan) M Hontama	6	6
(United States) R Anderson (United States) D Hewitt	7	7
WC	(United States) A Blokhina (United States) A Markham	5	5
(United States) H Baptiste (United States) W Osuigwe	6	5	[10]
2	(Japan) E Hozumi (Japan) M Uchijima	3	7	[8]

Quarterfinals
(Ukraine) K Volodko (India) S Yamalapalli	5	5
(United States) S Chang (Ukraine) Y Starodubtseva	7	7
M Kozyreva; V Miroshnichenko	6	2	[10]
(United States) J Daniel (United States) M Kessler	4	6	[5]
(United States) A Lahey (United States) A Smith	2	7^{7}	[12]
4	(Australia) O Gadecki (Japan) M Hontama	6	6^{5}	[14]
(United States) R Anderson (United States) D Hewitt	4	7	[9]
(United States) H Baptiste (United States) W Osuigwe	6	5	[11]

Semifinals
(United States) S Chang (Ukraine) Y Starodubtseva	6	6
M Kozyreva; V Miroshnichenko	3	3
4	(Australia) O Gadecki (Japan) M Hontama	6	6
(United States) H Baptiste (United States) W Osuigwe	4	3

Final
(United States) S Chang (Ukraine) Y Starodubtseva	w/o
4	(Australia) O Gadecki (Japan) M Hontama
