= 2025 Koser Jewelers Tennis Challenge – Doubles =

Doubles
- 2025 Koser Jewelers Tennis Challenge

Final
- Champions: (United States) Carmen Corley (United States) Ivana Corley
- Runners-up: (Brazil) Ingrid Martins (Switzerland) Simona Waltert
- Score: 4–6, 7–6^{(7–4)}, [12–10]

Events
Singles	Doubles
← 2024 ·	Koser Jewelers Tennis Challenge	· 2026 →

Sophie Chang and Yulia Starodubtseva were the reigning champion from when the tournament final was last held in 2023, but they chose not to compete this year.

Carmen and Ivana Corley won the title, defeating Ingrid Martins and Simona Waltert in the final, 4–6, 7–6^{(7–4)}, [12–10].

== Seeds ==
1. (Brazil) Ingrid Martins / (Switzerland) Simona Waltert (final)
2. Maria Kozyreva / Iryna Shymanovich (quarterfinals)
3. (United States) Carmen Corley / (United States) Ivana Corley (champions)
4. (United States) Jessie Aney / (United States) Jessica Failla (first round)

== Draw ==
Key

- Q = Qualifier
- WC = Wild card
- LL = Lucky loser
- Alt = Alternate
- ITF = ITF entry
- PR = Protected ranking
- SR = Special ranking
- SE = Special exempt
- JE = Junior exempt
- JR = Junior Accelerator Programme entrant
- CO = College Accelerator Programme entrant
- NG = Next Gen Accelerator Program entrant
- w/o = Walkover
- r = Retired
- d = Defaulted

=== Draw ===
First round
1	(Brazil) I Martins (Switzerland) S Waltert	6	6
(United States) R Anderson (France) J Ponchet	2	4
(United States) M Jones (United States) A Rogers	7^{7}	4	[6]
(United States) A Akli (United States) A Rencheli	6^{1}	6	[10]
4	(United States) J Aney (United States) J Failla	5	2
(Croatia) P Marčinko (Thailand) L Tararudee	7	6
(United States) H Giavara (Australia) A Osborne	4	3
(United States) E Kalieva (Brazil) L Pigossi	6	6
(Netherlands) A Hartono (India) P Thombare	6^{3}	6	[10]
(China) Y Ma (Japan) H Sakatsume	7^{7}	4	[8]
(United States) H Chang (United States) C Liu	1	6^{2}
3	(United States) C Corley (United States) I Corley	6	7^{7}
(Canada) K Cross (United States) A Smith	4	2
(Japan) S Imamura (Indonesia) J Tjen	6	6
(United States) E Cayetano (United States) C Rosca	6	5	[4]
2	M Kozyreva; I Shymanovich	2	7	[10]

Quarterfinals
1	(Brazil) I Martins (Switzerland) S Waltert	6	6
(United States) A Akli (United States) A Rencheli	3	4
(Croatia) P Marčinko (Thailand) L Tararudee	6	6
(United States) E Kalieva (Brazil) L Pigossi	1	3
(Netherlands) A Hartono (India) P Thombare	2	0
3	(United States) C Corley (United States) I Corley	6	6
(Japan) S Imamura (Indonesia) J Tjen	6	6
2	M Kozyreva; I Shymanovich	4	4

Semifinals
1	(Brazil) I Martins (Switzerland) S Waltert	6	6
(Croatia) P Marčinko (Thailand) L Tararudee	4	1
3	(United States) C Corley (United States) I Corley	2	6	[11]
(Japan) S Imamura (Indonesia) J Tjen	6	3	[9]

Final
1	(Brazil) I Martins (Switzerland) S Waltert	6	6^{4}	[10]
3	(United States) C Corley (United States) I Corley	4	7^{7}	[12]
