= 2025 Koser Jewelers Tennis Challenge =

Tennis tournament

- Date: 4–10 August 2025
- Edition: 18th
- Category: ITF Women's World Tennis Tour
- Prize money: $100,000
- Surface: Hard / Outdoor
- Location: Landisville, United States

Champions

Singles
- (Croatia) Petra Marčinko

Doubles
- (United States) Carmen Corley / (United States) Ivana Corley
← 2024 ·	Koser Jewelers Tennis Challenge	· 2026 →

The 2025 Koser Jewelers Tennis Challenge was a professional tennis tournament played on outdoor hard courts. It was the eighteenth edition of the tournament, which was part of the 2025 ITF Women's World Tennis Tour. It took place in Landisville, Pennsylvania, United States, between 4 and 10 August 2025.

== Champions ==
=== Singles ===
- (Croatia) Petra Marčinko def. (Indonesia) Janice Tjen, 7–6^{(7–4)}, 3–6, 6–4

=== Doubles ===
- (United States) Carmen Corley / (United States) Ivana Corley def. (Brazil) Ingrid Martins / (Switzerland) Simona Waltert, 4–6, 7–6^{(7–4)}, [12–10]

== Singles main draw entrants ==
=== Seeds ===
Country	Player	Rank	Seed
AUS	Talia Gibson	107	1
SUI	Simona Waltert	128	2
CRO	Petra Marčinko	133	3
FRA	Jessika Ponchet	139	4
	Tatiana Prozorova	140	5
CHN	Wei Sijia	146	7
CHN	Wang Xiyu	158	8
THA	Lanlana Tararudee	167	8

- Rankings are as of 28 July 2025.

=== Other entrants ===
The following players received wildcards into the singles main draw:

- (United States) Haley Giavara
- (United States) Elizabeth Ionescu
- (United States) Alana Smith

The following players received entry from the qualifying draw:

- (United States) Ayana Akli
- (United States) Robin Anderson
- (Japan) Mayu Crossley
- (United States) Amelia Honer
- (Japan) Saki Imamura
- (United States) Elvina Kalieva
- (Japan) Himeno Sakatsume
- (Canada) Katherine Sebov

The following player received entry as a lucky loser:

- (United States) Rachel Gailis
