= 2021 Chicago Fall Tennis Classic =

- Date: 27 September–3 October
- Edition: 1st
- Category: WTA 500
- Draw: 56S / 32Q / 28D
- Prize money: $565,530
- Surface: Hard / outdoor
- Location: Chicago, United States
- Venue: XS Tennis Village

Champions

Singles
- (Spain) Garbiñe Muguruza

Doubles
- (Czech Republic) Květa Peschke / (Germany) Andrea Petkovic
Chicago Fall Tennis Classic	· 2022 →

The 2021 Chicago Fall Tennis Classic was a WTA tournament organised for female professional tennis players on outdoor hard courts due to the cancellation of the Asian tournaments because of the ongoing COVID-19 pandemic. It was the 1st edition of the event and took place at XS Tennis and Education Foundation in Chicago, United States from 27 September to 3 October 2021.

== Champions ==
=== Singles ===
- (Spain) Garbiñe Muguruza def. (Tunisia) Ons Jabeur, 3–6, 6–3, 6–0

=== Doubles ===
- (Czech Republic) Květa Peschke / (Germany) Andrea Petkovic def. (United States) Caroline Dolehide / (United States) CoCo Vandeweghe, 6–3, 6–1

== Singles main draw entrants ==
=== Seeds ===
Country	Player	Rank^{1}	Seed
UKR	Elina Svitolina	4	1
ESP	Garbiñe Muguruza	9	2
SUI	Belinda Bencic	11	3
RUS	Anastasia Pavlyuchenkova	13	4
KAZ	Elena Rybakina	16	5
TUN	Ons Jabeur	17	6
BEL	Elise Mertens	18	7
CAN	Bianca Andreescu	20	8
USA	Jessica Pegula	23	9
USA	Danielle Collins	26	10
EST	Anett Kontaveit	30	11
RUS	Veronika Kudermetova	31	12
SLO	Tamara Zidanšek	33	13
BLR	Victoria Azarenka	35	14
ITA	Camila Giorgi	39	15
SUI	Jil Teichmann	42	16

- Rankings are as of September 20, 2021.

=== Other entrants ===
The following players received wildcards into the singles main draw:

- (United States) Hailey Baptiste
- (Belgium) Kim Clijsters
- (United States) Caroline Dolehide
- (United States) CoCo Vandeweghe

The following players received entry from the qualifying draw:

- (Australia) Lizette Cabrera
- (Belgium) Kirsten Flipkens
- (Poland) Magdalena Fręch
- (Brazil) Beatriz Haddad Maia
- (Japan) Mai Hontama
- (Australia) Maddison Inglis
- (Russia) Anna Kalinskaya
- (Ukraine) Kateryna Kozlova

The following players received entry as lucky losers:

- (United Kingdom) Harriet Dart
- (Belarus) Olga Govortsova

=== Withdrawals ===
Before the tournament

- (Romania) Sorana Cîrstea → replaced by (Chinese Taipei) Hsieh Su-wei
- (United States) Coco Gauff → replaced by (United States) Ann Li
- (Russia) Daria Kasatkina → replaced by (United States) Amanda Anisimova
- (United States) Sofia Kenin → replaced by (Germany) Andrea Petkovic
- (United Kingdom) Johanna Konta → replaced by (United States) Madison Brengle
- (Czech Republic) Petra Kvitová → replaced by (Japan) Misaki Doi
- (Croatia) Petra Martić → replaced by (Colombia) Camila Osorio
- (Latvia) Jeļena Ostapenko → replaced by (United Kingdom) Harriet Dart
- (Czech Republic) Karolína Plíšková → replaced by (Estonia) Kaia Kanepi
- (United States) Alison Riske → replaced by (Italy) Jasmine Paolini
- (Belarus) Aryna Sabalenka → replaced by (United States) Sloane Stephens
- (Greece) Maria Sakkari → replaced by (Belarus) Olga Govortsova
- (Russia) Elena Vesnina → replaced by (Czech Republic) Marie Bouzková

During the tournament

- (Belarus) Victoria Azarenka
- (Estonia) Anett Kontaveit
- (Czech Republic) Markéta Vondroušová

== Doubles main draw entrants ==
=== Seeds ===
Country	Player	Country	Player	Rank^{1}	Seed
TPE	Hsieh Su-wei	BEL	Elise Mertens	5	1
JPN	Shuko Aoyama	JPN	Ena Shibahara	16	2
CHI	Alexa Guarachi	USA	Desirae Krawczyk	31	3
RUS	Veronika Kudermetova	USA	Bethanie Mattek-Sands	32	4
USA	Nicole Melichar-Martinez	NED	Demi Schuurs	34	5
CRO	Darija Jurak	SLO	Andreja Klepač	47	6
CAN	Sharon Fichman	MEX	Giuliana Olmos	57	7
CZE	Marie Bouzková	CZE	Lucie Hradecká	72	8

- ^{1} Rankings as of September 20, 2021.

=== Other entrants ===
The following pairs received wildcards into the doubles main draw:

- (United States) Hailey Baptiste / (United States) Whitney Osuigwe
- (Belgium) Kim Clijsters / (Belgium) Kirsten Flipkens
- (United States) Caroline Dolehide / (United States) CoCo Vandeweghe

The following pair received entry into the doubles main draw using a protected ranking:

- (United States) Ingrid Neel / (Australia) Anastasia Rodionova

=== Withdrawals ===
Before the tournament

- (Ukraine) Lyudmyla Kichenok / (Latvia) Jeļena Ostapenko → replaced by (Poland) Magdalena Fręch / (Poland) Katarzyna Kawa
- (Ukraine) Marta Kostyuk / (Ukraine) Dayana Yastremska → replaced by (Ukraine) Lyudmyla Kichenok / (Ukraine) Marta Kostyuk
- (United States) Jamie Loeb / (Slovakia) Tereza Mihalíková → replaced by (United Kingdom) Harriet Dart / (Slovakia) Tereza Mihalíková
