= 2023 Koser Jewelers Tennis Challenge – Singles =

Singles
- 2023 Koser Jewelers Tennis Challenge

Final
- Champion: (China) Wang Xinyu
- Runner-up: (United States) Madison Brengle
- Score: 6–2, 6–3

Events
Singles	Doubles
← 2022 ·	Koser Jewelers Tennis Challenge	· 2024 →

Wang Xinyu won the title, defeating former three-time champion Madison Brengle in the final, 6–2, 6–3.

Zhu Lin was the defending champion, but chose to compete in Montreal instead.

== Seeds ==
1. (China) Wang Xinyu (champion)
2. (Sweden) Rebecca Peterson (first round)
3. (United States) Caroline Dolehide (quarterfinals)
4. (United States) Madison Brengle (final)
5. (Switzerland) Simona Waltert (first round)
6. (Australia) Olivia Gadecki (second round)
7. Erika Andreeva (quarterfinals)
8. (South Korea) Jang Su-jeong (semifinals)

== Draw ==
=== Key ===
- Q = Qualifier
- WC = Wild card
- LL = Lucky loser
- Alt = Alternate
- ITF = ITF entry
- PR = Protected ranking
- SR = Special ranking
- SE = Special exempt
- JE = Junior exempt
- JR = Junior Accelerator Programme entrant
- CO = College Accelerator Programme entrant
- NG = Next Gen Accelerator Program entrant
- w/o = Walkover
- r = Retired
- d = Defaulted

=== Finals ===
Semifinals
1	(China) Wang Xinyu	7	6^{6}	6
WC	(United States) Makenna Jones	5	7^{8}	0
4	(United States) Madison Brengle	6	6
8	(South Korea) Jang Su-jeong	3	4

Final
1	(China) Wang Xinyu	6	6
4	(United States) Madison Brengle	2	3

=== Top half ===
First round
1	(China) X Wang	6	4	6
(Ukraine) Y Starodubtseva	4	6	4
WC	(United States) M Kessler	3	6	6
(Japan) H Sakatsume	6	4	2
(United States) J Loeb	1	7	6
(Canada) S Fung	6	6	4
Q	(United States) R Anderson	2	3
7	E Andreeva	6	6
3	(United States) C Dolehide	6	1	6
(Mexico) M Zacarías	4	6	3
I Shymanovich	1	6	3
(France) E Jacquemot	6	4	6
WC	(United States) M Jones	3	7	6
(Australia) A Sharma	6	5	3
Q	(India) S Yamalapalli	6	4	5
6	(Australia) O Gadecki	3	6	7

Second round
1	(China) X Wang	6	6
WC	(United States) M Kessler	4	4
(United States) J Loeb	4	3
7	E Andreeva	6	6
3	(United States) C Dolehide	6	6
(France) E Jacquemot	4	4
WC	(United States) M Jones	6	6
6	(Australia) O Gadecki	4	2

Quarterfinals
1	(China) X Wang	6	6^{2}	6
7	E Andreeva	1	7^{7}	2
3	(United States) C Dolehide	6^{6}	6	4
WC	(United States) M Jones	7^{8}	4	6

Semifinals
1	(China) X Wang	7	6^{6}	6
WC	(United States) M Jones	5	7^{8}	0

=== Bottom half ===
First round
5	(Switzerland) S Waltert	3	3
WC	(United States) M Stoiana	6	6
WC	(United States) S Chang	6	6^{5}	2
Q	(United States) M Sieg	3	7^{7}	6
Q	(Ukraine) H Poznikhirenko	6	7^{7}
(Japan) M Uchijima	3	6^{5}
Q	V Miroshnichenko	6	3	0
4	(United States) M Brengle	1	6	6
8	(South Korea) S-j Jang	6	6
Q	(United States) A Smith	3	0
Q	(Bosnia and Herzegovina) N Berberović	3	4
Q	(United States) A Kiick	6	6
(China) Y Wang	6^{4}	3
SE	(Mexico) R Zarazúa	7^{7}	6
(Japan) M Hontama	6	6
2	(Sweden) R Peterson	1	2

Second round
WC	(United States) M Stoiana	7	6
Q	(United States) M Sieg	5	3
Q	(Ukraine) H Poznikhirenko	5	1
4	(United States) M Brengle	7	6
8	(South Korea) S-j Jang	6	6
Q	(United States) A Kiick	4	3
SE	(Mexico) R Zarazúa	6	6
(Japan) M Hontama	2	1

Quarterfinals
WC	(United States) M Stoiana	0	1
4	(United States) M Brengle	6	6
8	(South Korea) S-j Jang	6	6
SE	(Mexico) R Zarazúa	2	1

Semifinals
4	(United States) M Brengle	6	6
8	(South Korea) S-j Jang	3	4
