= 2024 Koser Jewelers Tennis Challenge – Singles =

Singles
- 2024 Koser Jewelers Tennis Challenge

Final
- Champion: (United States) McCartney Kessler
- Runner-up: (Australia) Olivia Gadecki
- Score: 4–6, 6–2, 6–4

Events
Singles	Doubles
← 2023 ·	Koser Jewelers Tennis Challenge	· 2025 →

Wang Xinyu was the defending champion but chose not to participate.

McCartney Kessler won the title, defeating Olivia Gadecki in the final, 4–6, 6–2, 6–4.

== Seeds ==
1. (Mexico) Renata Zarazúa (second round)
2. Kamilla Rakhimova (first round)
3. (Japan) Mai Hontama (first round)
4. (United States) Ann Li (second round)
5. (United States) McCartney Kessler (champion)
6. (Australia) Maya Joint (second round)
7. (Czech Republic) Linda Fruhvirtová (first round, retired)
8. (France) Jessika Ponchet (first round)

== Draw ==
=== Key ===
- Q = Qualifier
- WC = Wild card
- LL = Lucky loser
- Alt = Alternate
- SE = Special exempt
- PR = Protected ranking
- ITF = ITF entry
- JE = Junior exempt
- w/o = Walkover
- r = Retired
- d = Defaulted
- SR = Special ranking

=== Finals ===
Semifinals
(Netherlands) Arianne Hartono	3	5
5	(United States) McCartney Kessler	6	7
SE	(China) Wei Sijia	3	6	3
(Australia) Olivia Gadecki	6	3	6

Final
5	(United States) McCartney Kessler	4	6	6
(Australia) Olivia Gadecki	6	2	4

=== Top half ===
First round
1	(Mexico) R Zarazúa	6	6
WC	(United States) E Ionescu	2	1
WC	(United States) S Chang	3	4
Q	(United States) K Scott	6	6
(Netherlands) A Hartono	7	7
(Portugal) F Jorge	5	5
Q	(United States) R Anderson	7	5
7	(Czech Republic) L Fruhvirtová	5	2^{r}
3	(Japan) M Hontama	3	0
(Ukraine) Y Starodubtseva	6	6
SE	(Thailand) M Sawangkaew	1	7^{7}	2
(Japan) S Saito	6	6^{4}	6
Q	I Shymanovich	7	4	6
Q	(Canada) K Cross	5	6	4
Q	(Japan) S Ishii	2	3
5	(United States) M Kessler	6	6

Second round
1	(Mexico) R Zarazúa	4	6	5
Q	(United States) K Scott	6	3	7
(Netherlands) A Hartono	6	6
Q	(United States) R Anderson	4	3
(Ukraine) Y Starodubtseva	6	6
(Japan) S Saito	2	1
Q	I Shymanovich	4	0
5	(United States) M Kessler	6	6

Quarterfinals
Q	(United States) K Scott	0^{r}
(Netherlands) A Hartono	2
(Ukraine) Y Starodubtseva	6^{5}	3
5	(United States) M Kessler	7^{7}	6

Semifinals
(Netherlands) A Hartono	3	5
5	(United States) M Kessler	6	7

=== Bottom half ===
First round
6	(Australia) M Joint	6	7^{7}
(Australia) A Sharma	4	6^{3}
Q	(China) Y Ma	6	2	6
WC	(United States) M Mateas	1	6	2
SE	(China) S Wei	7^{7}	7
Q	(United States) H Chang	6^{4}	5
(United States) E Mandlik	2	6^{3}
4	(United States) A Li	6	7^{7}
8	(France) J Ponchet	6	3	4
(Australia) T Gibson	1	6	6
Q	(Japan) H Sakatsume	7	3	2
(Australia) O Gadecki	5	6	6
(Philippines) A Eala	7	6
(Australia) T Preston	5	1
WC	(United States) M Stoiana	2	6	6
2	K Rakhimova	6	4	2

Second round
6	(Australia) M Joint	6	5	6^{5}
Q	(China) Y Ma	1	7	7^{7}
SE	(China) S Wei	6	6
4	(United States) A Li	3	2
(Australia) T Gibson	1	1
(Australia) O Gadecki	6	6
(Philippines) A Eala	7	6
WC	(United States) M Stoiana	5	2

Quarterfinals
Q	(China) Y Ma	1	2
SE	(China) S Wei	6	6
(Australia) O Gadecki	6	0	6
(Philippines) A Eala	1	6	3

Semifinals
SE	(China) S Wei	3	6	3
(Australia) O Gadecki	6	3	6
