= 2025 Koser Jewelers Tennis Challenge – Singles =

Singles
- 2025 Koser Jewelers Tennis Challenge

Final
- Champion: (Croatia) Petra Marčinko
- Runner-up: (Indonesia) Janice Tjen
- Score: 7–6^{(7–4)}, 3–6, 6–4

Events
Singles	Doubles
← 2024 ·	Koser Jewelers Tennis Challenge	· 2026 →

McCartney Kessler was the defending champion but chose to compete in Montreal instead.

Petra Marčinko won the title, defeating Janice Tjen in the final, 7–6^{(7–4)}, 3–6, 6–4.

== Seeds ==
1. (Australia) Talia Gibson (second round)
2. (Switzerland) Simona Waltert (second round)
3. (Croatia) Petra Marčinko (champion)
4. (France) Jessika Ponchet (semifinals)
5. Tatiana Prozorova (second round)
6. (China) Wei Sijia (first round)
7. (China) Wang Xiyu (first round, retired)
8. (Thailand) Lanlana Tararudee (quarterfinals)

== Draw ==
=== Key ===
- Q = Qualifier
- WC = Wild card
- LL = Lucky loser
- Alt = Alternate
- ITF = ITF entry
- PR = Protected ranking
- SR = Special ranking
- SE = Special exempt
- JE = Junior exempt
- JR = Junior Accelerator Programme entrant
- CO = College Accelerator Programme entrant
- NG = Next Gen Accelerator Program entrant
- w/o = Walkover
- r = Retired
- d = Defaulted

=== Finals ===
Semifinals
Q	(United States) Ayana Akli	0	2
3	(Croatia) Petra Marčinko	6	6
4	(France) Jessika Ponchet	4	3
(Indonesia) Janice Tjen	6	6

Final
3	(Croatia) Petra Marčinko	7^{7}	3	6
(Indonesia) Janice Tjen	6^{4}	6	4

=== Top half ===
First round
1	(Australia) T Gibson	6	7
(Brazil) L Pigossi	4	5
Q	(United States) A Akli	6	6
Q	(Japan) H Sakatsume	0	4
(Netherlands) A Hartono	2	7	7^{9}
(Canada) K Cross	6	5	6^{7}
(United States) M Stoiana	3	6	6
6	(China) S Wei	6	2	1
3	(Croatia) P Marčinko	6	4	6
(United States) A Rogers	1	6	1
(Czech Republic) D Vidmanová	6	6
Q	(United States) A Honer	0	0
WC	(United States) A Smith	4	6	4
LL	(United States) R Gailis	6	2	6
I Shymanovich	1	6	1
7	(China) X Wang	6	3	0^{r}

Second round
1	(Australia) T Gibson	6^{5}	5
Q	(United States) A Akli	7^{7}	7
(Netherlands) A Hartono	3	2
(United States) M Stoiana	6	6
3	(Croatia) P Marčinko	6	4	6
(Czech Republic) D Vidmanová	1	6	3
LL	(United States) R Gailis	4	6	4
I Shymanovich	6	3	6

Quarterfinals
Q	(United States) A Akli	6	6
(United States) M Stoiana	4	3
3	(Croatia) P Marčinko	6	6
I Shymanovich	1	0

Semifinals
Q	(United States) A Akli	0	2
3	(Croatia) P Marčinko	6	6

=== Bottom half ===
First round
5	T Prozorova	4	6	6
Q	(Japan) S Imamura	6	2	3
Q	(United States) E Kalieva	3	6	6
(Australia) L Cabrera	6	4	3
(United States) H Chang	4	6	3
(China) Y Ma	6	4	6
Q	(Canada) K Sebov	4	0
4	(France) J Ponchet	6	6
8	(Thailand) L Tararudee	7^{7}	6
(Canada) C Branstine	6^{2}	2
WC	(United States) H Giavara	4	1
Q	(Japan) M Crossley	6	6
(Indonesia) J Tjen	6	6
WC	(United States) E Ionescu	3	1
Q	(United States) R Anderson	3	6	6^{1}
2	(Switzerland) S Waltert	6	1	7^{7}

Second round
5	T Prozorova	4	1
Q	(United States) E Kalieva	6	6
(China) Y Ma	6	6^{1}	3
4	(France) J Ponchet	3	7^{7}	6
8	(Thailand) L Tararudee	6	6^{0}	6
Q	(Japan) M Crossley	1	7^{7}	3
(Indonesia) J Tjen	6	6
2	(Switzerland) S Waltert	4	4

Quarterfinals
Q	(United States) E Kalieva	1	3
4	(France) J Ponchet	6	6
8	(Thailand) L Tararudee	1	3
(Indonesia) J Tjen	6	6

Semifinals
4	(France) J Ponchet	4	3
(Indonesia) J Tjen	6	6
