= 2021 Chicago Fall Tennis Classic – Singles =

Singles
- 2021 Chicago Fall Tennis Classic

Final
- Champion: (Spain) Garbiñe Muguruza
- Runner-up: (Tunisia) Ons Jabeur
- Score: 3–6, 6–3, 6–0

Details
- Draw: 56
- Seeds: 16

Events
Singles	Doubles
- Chicago Fall Tennis Classic

This was the first edition of the event.

Garbiñe Muguruza won the title, defeating Ons Jabeur in the final, 3–6, 6–3, 6–0.

== Seeds ==
The top eight seeds received a bye into the second round.

1. (Ukraine) Elina Svitolina (quarterfinals)
2. (Spain) Garbiñe Muguruza (champion)
3. (Switzerland) Belinda Bencic (quarterfinals, retired)
4. (Russia) Anastasia Pavlyuchenkova (second round)
5. (Kazakhstan) Elena Rybakina (semifinals, retired)
6. (Tunisia) Ons Jabeur (final)
7. (Belgium) Elise Mertens (third round)
8. (Canada) Bianca Andreescu (second round)
9. (United States) Jessica Pegula (third round)
10. (United States) Danielle Collins (quarterfinals)
11. (Estonia) Anett Kontaveit (second round, withdrew)
12. (Russia) Veronika Kudermetova (third round)
13. (Slovenia) Tamara Zidanšek (second round)
14. (Belarus) Victoria Azarenka (third round, withdrew)
15. (Italy) Camila Giorgi (first round)
16. (Switzerland) Jil Teichmann (third round)

== Draw ==
Key

- Q = Qualifier
- WC = Wild card
- LL = Lucky loser
- Alt = Alternate
- ITF = ITF entry
- PR = Protected ranking
- SR = Special ranking
- SE = Special exempt
- JE = Junior exempt
- JR = Junior Accelerator Programme entrant
- CO = College Accelerator Programme entrant
- NG = Next Gen Accelerator Program entrant
- w/o = Walkover
- r = Retired
- d = Defaulted

=== Finals ===
Quarterfinals
1	(Ukraine) Elina Svitolina	4	2
6	(Tunisia) Ons Jabeur	6	6
3	(Switzerland) Belinda Bencic	4	1^{r}
5	(Kazakhstan) Elena Rybakina	6	3
10	(United States) Danielle Collins	7^{7}	0	6^{3}
(Czech Republic) Markéta Vondroušová	6^{4}	6	7^{7}
Q	(Japan) Mai Hontama	3	2
2	(Spain) Garbiñe Muguruza	6	6

Semifinals
6	(Tunisia) Ons Jabeur	6	3
5	(Kazakhstan) Elena Rybakina	4	2^{r}
(Czech Republic) Markéta Vondroušová
2	(Spain) Garbiñe Muguruza	w/o

Final
6	(Tunisia) Ons Jabeur	6	3	0
2	(Spain) Garbiñe Muguruza	3	6	6

=== Top half ===
==== Section 1 ====
First round
(United States) A Anisimova	6	5	6
(Switzerland) V Golubic	0	7	4
Q	(Ukraine) K Kozlova	6^{2}	6	6
(Ukraine) M Kostyuk	7^{7}	3	0
(Romania) E-G Ruse	6	6
15	(Italy) C Giorgi	4	2
9	(United States) J Pegula	6	6
Q	(Poland) M Fręch	3	0
(Germany) A Petkovic	6	6
LL	(Belarus) O Govortsova	2	2
WC	(Belgium) K Clijsters	3	7	3
(Chinese Taipei) S-w Hsieh	6	5	6

Second round
1	(Ukraine) E Svitolina	6	6
(United States) A Anisimova	4	3
Q	(Ukraine) K Kozlova	5	2
(Romania) E-G Ruse	7	6
9	(United States) J Pegula	6	7
(Germany) A Petkovic	2	5
(Chinese Taipei) S-w Hsieh	1	0
6	(Tunisia) O Jabeur	6	6

Third round
1	(Ukraine) E Svitolina	6	6
(Romania) E-G Ruse	3	3
9	(United States) J Pegula	6	2	3
6	(Tunisia) O Jabeur	1	6	6

Quarterfinals
1	(Ukraine) E Svitolina	4	2
6	(Tunisia) O Jabeur	6	6

==== Section 2 ====
First round
Q	(Australia) M Inglis	4	6	6
WC	(United States) C Dolehide	6	2	4
(Colombia) C Osorio	3	5
(Czech Republic) T Martincová	6	7
(United States) S Stephens	2	1
13	(Slovenia) T Zidanšek	6	6
12	(Russia) V Kudermetova	7	4	6
Q	(Russia) A Kalinskaya	6^{8}	6	2
LL	(United Kingdom) H Dart	6	3	6
Q	(Brazil) B Haddad Maia	1	6	1
(Belarus) A Sasnovich	6	2
(United States) M Keys	4	0^{r}

Second round
3	(Switzerland) B Bencic	5	6	6
Q	(Australia) M Inglis	7	1	0
(Czech Republic) T Martincová	6	7
13	(Slovenia) T Zidanšek	2	5
12	(Russia) V Kudermetova	6	6
LL	(United Kingdom) H Dart	3	4
(Belarus) A Sasnovich	4	4
5	(Kazakhstan) E Rybakina	6	6

Third round
3	(Switzerland) B Bencic	6	7^{7}
(Czech Republic) T Martincová	2	6^{5}
12	(Russia) V Kudermetova	6^{4}	5
5	(Kazakhstan) E Rybakina	7^{7}	7

Quarterfinals
3	(Switzerland) B Bencic	4	1^{r}
5	(Kazakhstan) E Rybakina	6	3

=== Bottom half ===
==== Section 3 ====
First round
(France) A Cornet	5	1
(Ukraine) D Yastremska	7	6
(Czech Republic) M Bouzková	3	7^{7}	3
(Japan) M Doi	6	6^{4}	6
Q	(Belgium) K Flipkens	4	2
10	(United States) D Collins	6	6
16	(Switzerland) J Teichmann	7^{7}	7
(Estonia) K Kanepi	6^{3}	5
WC	(United States) C Vandeweghe	1	4
(Poland) M Linette	6	6
(Australia) A Tomljanović	2	1
(Czech Republic) M Vondroušová	6	6

Second round
7	(Belgium) E Mertens	6	6
(Ukraine) D Yastremska	1	3
(Japan) M Doi	6	3	5
10	(United States) D Collins	4	6	7
16	(Switzerland) J Teichmann	6	6
(Poland) M Linette	2	4
(Czech Republic) M Vondroušová	6	6
4	(Russia) A Pavlyuchenkova	3	2

Third round
7	(Belgium) E Mertens	2	4
10	(United States) D Collins	6	6
16	(Switzerland) J Teichmann	4	3
(Czech Republic) M Vondroušová	6	6

Quarterfinals
10	(United States) D Collins	7^{7}	0	6^{3}
(Czech Republic) M Vondroušová	6^{4}	6	7^{7}

==== Section 4 ====
First round
Q	(Australia) L Cabrera	2	1
(United States) S Rogers	6	6
Q	(Japan) M Hontama	6	6
(France) C Garcia	3	0
(United States) M Brengle	4	3
11	(Estonia) A Kontaveit	6	6
14	(Belarus) V Azarenka	6	6
(China) S Zhang	2	1
WC	(United States) H Baptiste	7	6
(Italy) J Paolini	5	3
(Croatia) D Vekić	3	1
(United States) A Li	6	6

Second round
8	(Canada) B Andreescu	4	5
(United States) S Rogers	6	7
Q	(Japan) M Hontama	w/o
11	(Estonia) A Kontaveit
14	(Belarus) V Azarenka	6	4	6
WC	(United States) H Baptiste	2	6	3
(United States) A Li	4	4
2	(Spain) G Muguruza	6	6

Third round
(United States) S Rogers	4	7^{7}	1
Q	(Japan) M Hontama	6	6^{1}	6
14	(Belarus) V Azarenka
2	(Spain) G Muguruza	w/o

Quarterfinals
Q	(Japan) M Hontama	3	2
2	(Spain) G Muguruza	6	6

== Qualifying ==
=== Seeds ===
1. (Poland) Magdalena Fręch (qualified)
2. (Brazil) Beatriz Haddad Maia (qualified)
3. (Australia) Maddison Inglis (qualified)
4. (Belarus) Olga Govortsova (qualifying competition, lucky loser)
5. (Belgium) Kirsten Flipkens (qualified)
6. (Ukraine) Kateryna Kozlova (qualified)
7. (Russia) Anna Kalinskaya (qualified)
8. (United Kingdom) Harriet Dart (qualifying competition, lucky loser)
9. (Canada) Rebecca Marino (qualifying competition)
10. (Poland) Katarzyna Kawa (qualifying competition)
11. (Australia) Lizette Cabrera (qualified)
12. (United States) Asia Muhammad (qualifying competition)
13. (Georgia (country)) Mariam Bolkvadze (qualifying competition)
14. (Japan) Mai Hontama (qualified)
15. (United States) Alycia Parks (first round)
16. (Australia) Priscilla Hon (qualifying competition)

=== Qualifiers ===
1. (Poland) Magdalena Fręch
2. (Brazil) Beatriz Haddad Maia
3. (Australia) Maddison Inglis
4. (Australia) Lizette Cabrera
5. (Belgium) Kirsten Flipkens
6. (Ukraine) Kateryna Kozlova
7. (Russia) Anna Kalinskaya
8. (Japan) Mai Hontama

=== Lucky losers ===
1. (Belarus) Olga Govortsova
2. (United Kingdom) Harriet Dart

=== Draw ===
==== First qualifier ====
First round
1	(Poland) Magdalena Fręch	6^{6}	7^{7}	7
(United States) Alexa Glatch	7^{8}	6^{5}	5
(United States) Bethanie Mattek-Sands	6	6
15	(United States) Alycia Parks	3	4

Qualifying competition
1	(Poland) Magdalena Fręch	6	6
(United States) Bethanie Mattek-Sands	2	2

==== Second qualifier ====
First round
2	(Brazil) Beatriz Haddad Maia	6	6
(Ukraine) Nadiia Kichenok	1	1
WC	(United States) Ingrid Neel	3	4
10	(Poland) Katarzyna Kawa	6	6

Qualifying competition
2	(Brazil) Beatriz Haddad Maia	6	6
10	(Poland) Katarzyna Kawa	4	2

==== Third qualifier ====
First round
3	(Australia) Maddison Inglis	6	6
WC	(Germany) Julia Lohoff	2	2
(Japan) Ena Shibahara	0	4
12	(United States) Asia Muhammad	6	6

Qualifying competition
3	(Australia) Maddison Inglis	6^{2}	6	7^{7}
12	(United States) Asia Muhammad	7^{7}	4	6^{3}

==== Fourth qualifier ====
First round
4	(Belarus) Olga Govortsova	6	6
WC	(United States) Adesuwa Osabuohien	3	2
(United Kingdom) Tara Moore	1	7^{7}	2
11	(Australia) Lizette Cabrera	6	6^{4}	6

Qualifying competition
4	(Belarus) Olga Govortsova	4	0
11	(Australia) Lizette Cabrera	6	6

==== Fifth qualifier ====
First round
5	(Belgium) Kirsten Flipkens	6	6
WC	(United States) Madison Beckham	0	0
(United States) Catherine Harrison	6	3	2
9	(Canada) Rebecca Marino	3	6	6

Qualifying competition
5	(Belgium) Kirsten Flipkens	6	6^{2}	6
9	(Canada) Rebecca Marino	4	7^{7}	4

==== Sixth qualifier ====
First round
6	(Ukraine) Kateryna Kozlova	6	6
(United States) Nicole Melichar-Martinez	4	4
(Norway) Ulrikke Eikeri	1	7^{7}	4
16/PR	(Australia) Priscilla Hon	6	6^{3}	6

Qualifying competition
6	(Ukraine) Kateryna Kozlova	6	6^{4}	6
16/PR	(Australia) Priscilla Hon	2	7^{7}	3

==== Seventh qualifier ====
First round
7	(Russia) Anna Kalinskaya	7^{9}	6
(United States) Whitney Osuigwe	6^{7}	3
(Chile) Bárbara Gatica	2	1
13	(Georgia (country)) Mariam Bolkvadze	6	6

Qualifying competition
7	(Russia) Anna Kalinskaya	6	6
13	(Georgia (country)) Mariam Bolkvadze	2	1

==== Eighth qualifier ====
First round
8	(United Kingdom) Harriet Dart	7	6
(United States) Quinn Gleason	5	2
(United States) Emina Bektas	2	5
14	(Japan) Mai Hontama	6	7

Qualifying competition
8	(United Kingdom) Harriet Dart	5	6^{3}
14	(Japan) Mai Hontama	7	7^{7}
