= 2022 Koser Jewelers Tennis Challenge – Doubles =

Doubles
- 2022 Koser Jewelers Tennis Challenge

Final
- Champions: (United States) Sophie Chang (Kazakhstan) Anna Danilina
- Runners-up: (South Korea) Han Na-lae (South Korea) Jang Su-jeong
- Score: 2–6, 7–6^{(7–4)}, [11–9]

Events
Singles	Doubles
← 2021 ·	Koser Jewelers Tennis Challenge	· 2023 →

Hanna Chang and Alexa Glatch were the defending champions but Glatch chose not to participate. Chang partnered alongside Makenna Jones, but lost in the semifinals to Han Na-lae and Jang Su-jeong.

Sophie Chang and Anna Danilina won the title, defeating Han and Jang in the final, 2–6, 7–6^{(7–4)}, [11–9].

== Seeds ==
1. (United States) Sophie Chang / (Kazakhstan) Anna Danilina (champions)
2. (Netherlands) Lesley Pattinama Kerkhove / (United States) Sabrina Santamaria (quarterfinals)
3. (China) Han Xinyun / (China) Zhu Lin (quarterfinals)
4. (United States) Robin Anderson / (Netherlands) Arianne Hartono (quarterfinals)

== Draw ==
=== Key ===
- Q = Qualifier
- WC = Wild card
- LL = Lucky loser
- Alt = Alternate
- SE = Special exempt
- PR = Protected ranking
- ITF = ITF entry
- JE = Junior exempt
- w/o = Walkover
- r = Retired
- d = Defaulted
- SR = Special ranking

=== Draw ===
First round
1	(United States) S Chang (Kazakhstan) A Danilina	6	7
(United States) E Mandlik (United States) C Rosca	3	5
(Brazil) I Gamarra Martins (United Kingdom) E Webley-Smith	1	6	[10]
(France) T Andrianjafitrimo (Switzerland) S Waltert	6	3	[7]
3	(China) X Han (China) L Zhu	6	6
(United Kingdom) J Burrage (United Kingdom) E Silva	3	4
(United Kingdom) Y Miyazaki (Indonesia) J Rompies	4	2
(United States) F Di Lorenzo (Mexico) M Zacarías	6	6
WC	(United States) H Chang (United States) M Jones	w/o
I Shymanovich (India) K Thandi
(Uzbekistan) N Abduraimova (Japan) H Kuwata	6	5	[8]
4	(United States) R Anderson (Netherlands) A Hartono	4	7	[10]
WC	(United States) J Hart (United States) D Hewitt	3	6	[6]
(South Korea) N-l Han (South Korea) S-j Jang	6	3	[10]
WC	(United States) A Catanzarite (United States) H Shaikh	2	0
2	(Netherlands) L Pattinama Kerkhove (United States) S Santamaria	6	6

Quarterfinals
1	(United States) S Chang (Kazakhstan) A Danilina	5	6	[10]
(Brazil) I Gamarra Martins (United Kingdom) E Webley-Smith	7	1	[8]
3	(China) X Han (China) L Zhu	6^{8}	1
(United States) F Di Lorenzo (Mexico) M Zacarías	7^{10}	6
WC	(United States) H Chang (United States) M Jones	6	7
4	(United States) R Anderson (Netherlands) A Hartono	3	5
(South Korea) N-l Han (South Korea) S-j Jang	6	6
2	(Netherlands) L Pattinama Kerkhove (United States) S Santamaria	1	3

Semifinals
1	(United States) S Chang (Kazakhstan) A Danilina	6	6
(United States) F Di Lorenzo (Mexico) M Zacarías	1	3
WC	(United States) H Chang (United States) M Jones	4	6	[5]
(South Korea) N-l Han (South Korea) S-j Jang	6	3	[10]

Final
1	(United States) S Chang (Kazakhstan) A Danilina	2	7^{7}	[11]
(South Korea) N-l Han (South Korea) S-j Jang	6	6^{4}	[9]
