= 2022 Koser Jewelers Tennis Challenge – Singles =

Singles
- 2022 Koser Jewelers Tennis Challenge

Final
- Champion: (China) Zhu Lin
- Runner-up: (United States) Elizabeth Mandlik
- Score: 6–2, 6–3

Events
Singles	Doubles
← 2021 ·	Koser Jewelers Tennis Challenge	· 2023 →

Nuria Párrizas Díaz was the defending champion but chose to compete in Toronto instead.

Zhu Lin won the title, defeating Elizabeth Mandlik in the final, 6–2, 6–3.

== Seeds ==
1. (China) Zhu Lin (champion)
2. (France) Kristina Mladenovic (second round)
3. (France) Chloé Paquet (first round)
4. (South Korea) Jang Su-jeong (first round)
5. (Switzerland) Simona Waltert (semifinals)
6. Erika Andreeva (first round)
7. (China) Yuan Yue (second round)
8. (Poland) Katarzyna Kawa (quarterfinals)

== Draw ==
=== Key ===
- Q = Qualifier
- WC = Wild card
- LL = Lucky loser
- Alt = Alternate
- ITF = ITF entry
- PR = Protected ranking
- SR = Special ranking
- SE = Special exempt
- JE = Junior exempt
- JR = Junior Accelerator Programme entrant
- CO = College Accelerator Programme entrant
- NG = Next Gen Accelerator Program entrant
- w/o = Walkover
- r = Retired
- d = Defaulted

=== Finals ===
Semifinals
1	(China) Zhu Lin	6	6
(South Korea) Han Na-lae	3	4
5	(Switzerland) Simona Waltert	4	2
WC	(United States) Elizabeth Mandlik	6	6

Final
1	(China) Zhu Lin	6	6
WC	(United States) Elizabeth Mandlik	2	3

=== Top half ===
First round
1	(China) L Zhu	7^{7}	4	6
(United Kingdom) J Burrage	6^{2}	6	3
(United States) L Chirico	6	7^{7}
Q	(United States) M Jones	2	6^{5}
(United States) R Anderson	3	6	6
(France) T Andrianjafitrimo	6	2	3
(United States) S Chang	4	6^{5}
7	(China) Y Yuan	6	7^{7}
4	(South Korea) S-j Jang	4	6	4
Q	(United States) H Shaikh	6	2	6
Q	(Japan) H Kuwata	1	7	5
(United States) C Dolehide	6	5	7
LL	(United States) R Kingsley	6^{4}	6	3
Q	(Mexico) M Zacarías	7^{7}	2	6
(South Korea) N-l Han	5	6	7
6	E Andreeva	7	2	5

Second round
1	(China) L Zhu	6	6
(United States) L Chirico	4	2
(United States) R Anderson	6	5	6
7	(China) Y Yuan	4	7	3
Q	(United States) H Shaikh	4	3
(United States) C Dolehide	6	6
Q	(Mexico) M Zacarías	4	3
(South Korea) N-l Han	6	6

Quarterfinals
1	(China) L Zhu	5	6	6
(United States) R Anderson	7	2	0
(United States) C Dolehide	4	6^{3}
(South Korea) N-l Han	6	7^{7}

Semifinals
1	(China) L Zhu	6	6
(South Korea) N-l Han	3	4

=== Bottom half ===
First round
5	(Switzerland) S Waltert	5	7^{7}	6
WC	(United States) A Glatch	7	6^{3}	4
Q	(Japan) H Sakatsume	4	0
Q	I Shymanovich	6	6
Q	(United States) C Rosca	6	6
WC	(United States) N Coopersmith	1	1
(Netherlands) L Pattinama Kerkhove	6	6
3	(France) C Paquet	4	4
8	(Poland) K Kawa	3	6	6
(United States) F Di Lorenzo	6	0	4
(Uzbekistan) N Abduraimova	3	6	7
(United Kingdom) Y Miyazaki	6	3	5
WC	(United States) E Mandlik	7	6
(United States) H Chang	5	2
Q	(United States) M Manasse	7^{7}	2	6^{1}
2	(France) K Mladenovic	6^{5}	6	7^{7}

Second round
5	(Switzerland) S Waltert	4	6	6
Q	I Shymanovich	6	2	1
Q	(United States) C Rosca	1	0
(Netherlands) L Pattinama Kerkhove	6	6
8	(Poland) K Kawa	6	6
(Uzbekistan) N Abduraimova	1	2
WC	(United States) E Mandlik	6	6
2	(France) K Mladenovic	0	2

Quarterfinals
5	(Switzerland) S Waltert	7	6
(Netherlands) L Pattinama Kerkhove	5	2
8	(Poland) K Kawa	0	7	4
WC	(United States) E Mandlik	6	5	6

Semifinals
5	(Switzerland) S Waltert	4	2
WC	(United States) E Mandlik	6	6
