= Chicago Fall Tennis Classic =

2021 tennis tournament in Chicago

- 2021 Chicago Fall Tennis Classic

Defunct tennis tournament
- Founded: 2021
- Abolished: 2021
- Location: Chicago; United States
- Venue: XS Tennis Village
- Category: WTA 500
- Surface: Hard
- Draw: 56S / 32Q / 28D
- Prize money: $565,530 (2021)
- Website: WTA Website

Current champions (2021)
- Women's singles: (Spain) Garbiñe Muguruza
- Women's doubles: (Czech Republic) Květa Peschke / (Germany) Andrea Petkovic

The Chicago Fall Tennis Classic was a tennis tournament held in Chicago, Illinois, for female professional tennis players, with its first edition being a part of the 2021 WTA Tour. It was held on outdoor hard courts during the time of Autumn in late September.

== Results ==
=== Singles ===
Year	Champion	Runner-up	Score
2021	(Spain) Garbiñe Muguruza	(Tunisia) Ons Jabeur	3–6, 6–3, 6–0

=== Doubles ===
Year	Champions	Runners-up	Score
2021	(Czech Republic) Květa Peschke (Germany) Andrea Petkovic	(United States) Caroline Dolehide (United States) CoCo Vandeweghe	6–3, 6–1
