= 2021 Chicago Fall Tennis Classic – Doubles =

Doubles
- 2021 Chicago Fall Tennis Classic

Final
- Champions: (Czech Republic) Květa Peschke (Germany) Andrea Petkovic
- Runners-up: (United States) Caroline Dolehide (United States) CoCo Vandeweghe
- Score: 6–3, 6–1

Events
Singles	Doubles
Chicago Fall Tennis Classic	· 2022 →

This was the first edition of the event.

Květa Peschke and Andrea Petkovic won the title, defeating Caroline Dolehide and CoCo Vandeweghe in the final, 6–3, 6–1. This was Petkovic's first WTA doubles title.

Elise Mertens was in contention to regain the WTA no. 1 doubles ranking by winning the title, but she and partner Hsieh Su-wei withdrew from the competition in the quarterfinals. Barbora Krejčíková accordingly retained the top ranking.

== Seeds ==
The top four seeds received a bye into the second round.

1. (Chinese Taipei) Hsieh Su-wei / (Belgium) Elise Mertens (Quarterfinal, withdrew)
2. (Japan) Shuko Aoyama / (Japan) Ena Shibahara (quarterfinals)
3. (Chile) Alexa Guarachi / (United States) Desirae Krawczyk (quarterfinals)
4. (Russia) Veronika Kudermetova / (United States) Bethanie Mattek-Sands (quarterfinals)
5. (United States) Nicole Melichar-Martinez / (Netherlands) Demi Schuurs (semifinals)
6. (Croatia) Darija Jurak / (Slovenia) Andreja Klepač (semifinals)
7. (Canada) Sharon Fichman / (Mexico) Giuliana Olmos (first round)
8. (Czech Republic) Marie Bouzková / (Czech Republic) Lucie Hradecká (second round)

== Draw ==
=== Key ===
- Q = Qualifier
- WC = Wild card
- LL = Lucky loser
- Alt = Alternate
- SE = Special exempt
- PR = Protected ranking
- ITF = ITF entry
- JE = Junior exempt
- w/o = Walkover
- r = Retired
- d = Defaulted
- SR = Special ranking

=== Finals ===
Semifinals
5	(United States) Nicole Melichar-Martinez (Netherlands) Demi Schuurs	6^{4}	4
(Czech Republic) Květa Peschke (Germany) Andrea Petkovic	7^{7}	6
WC	(United States) Caroline Dolehide (United States) CoCo Vandeweghe	6	6
6	(Croatia) Darija Jurak (Slovenia) Andreja Klepač	3	4

Final
(Czech Republic) Květa Peschke (Germany) Andrea Petkovic	6	6
WC	(United States) Caroline Dolehide (United States) CoCo Vandeweghe	3	1

=== Top half ===
First round
(France) E Lechemia (Germany) J Lohoff	5	4
(Switzerland) V Golubic (Switzerland) J Teichmann	7	6
(Ukraine) N Kichenok (Romania) R Olaru	6	7
(United States) K Christian (New Zealand) E Routliffe	4	5
(United States) E Bektas (United Kingdom) T Moore	6^{7}	3
5	(United States) N Melichar-Martinez (Netherlands) D Schuurs	7^{9}	6
(United States) Q Gleason (Belarus) O Govortsova	7^{7}	4	[9]
(Ukraine) L Kichenok (Ukraine) M Kostyuk	6^{5}	6	[11]
WC	(Belgium) K Clijsters (Belgium) K Flipkens	4	2
(Poland) M Fręch (Poland) K Kawa	6	6
(Czech Republic) K Peschke (Germany) A Petkovic	6	6
7	(Canada) S Fichman (Mexico) G Olmos	4	4

Second round
1	(Chinese Taipei) S-w Hsieh (Belgium) E Mertens	6	3	[10]
(Switzerland) V Golubic (Switzerland) J Teichmann	4	6	[6]
(Ukraine) N Kichenok (Romania) R Olaru	6	5	[3]
5	(United States) N Melichar-Martinez (Netherlands) D Schuurs	4	7	[10]
3	(Chile) A Guarachi (United States) D Krawczyk	3	7	[10]
(Ukraine) L Kichenok (Ukraine) M Kostyuk	6	5	[6]
(Poland) M Fręch (Poland) K Kawa	6^{6}	7^{7}	[8]
(Czech Republic) K Peschke (Germany) A Petkovic	7^{8}	6^{5}	[10]

Quarterfinals
1	(Chinese Taipei) S-w Hsieh (Belgium) E Mertens
5	(United States) N Melichar-Martinez (Netherlands) D Schuurs	w/o
3	(Chile) A Guarachi (United States) D Krawczyk	6	4	[8]
(Czech Republic) K Peschke (Germany) A Petkovic	4	6	[10]

Semifinals
5	(United States) N Melichar-Martinez (Netherlands) D Schuurs	6^{4}	4
(Czech Republic) K Peschke (Germany) A Petkovic	7^{7}	6

=== Bottom half ===
First round
8	(Czech Republic) M Bouzková (Czech Republic) L Hradecká	7^{7}	6
(Norway) U Eikeri (United States) C Harrison	6^{3}	3
WC	(United States) C Dolehide (United States) C Vandeweghe	6	5	[10]
(India) S Mirza (China) S Zhang	1	7	[6]
(Poland) M Linette (Poland) A Rosolska	1	6	[10]
(United States) A Muhammad (United States) J Pegula	6	3	[8]
6	(Croatia) D Jurak (Slovenia) A Klepač	6	6
WC	(United States) H Baptiste (United States) W Osuigwe	4	1
(United Kingdom) H Dart (Slovakia) T Mihalíková	5	7^{11}	[6]
(Belarus) A Sasnovich (Slovenia) T Zidanšek	7	6^{9}	[10]
(Japan) M Ninomiya (United States) S Santamaria	6	6
PR	(United States) I Neel (Australia) An Rodionova	3	4

Second round
8	(Czech Republic) M Bouzková (Czech Republic) L Hradecká	3	2
WC	(United States) C Dolehide (United States) C Vandeweghe	6	6
(Poland) M Linette (Poland) A Rosolska	4	4
4	(Russia) V Kudermetova (United States) B Mattek-Sands	6	6
6	(Croatia) D Jurak (Slovenia) A Klepač	3	6	[10]
(Belarus) A Sasnovich (Slovenia) T Zidanšek	6	4	[7]
(Japan) M Ninomiya (United States) S Santamaria	1	3
2	(Japan) S Aoyama (Japan) E Shibahara	6	6

Quarterfinals
WC	(United States) C Dolehide (United States) C Vandeweghe	6	6
4	(Russia) V Kudermetova (United States) B Mattek-Sands	2	3
6	(Croatia) D Jurak (Slovenia) A Klepač	7^{7}	2	[11]
2	(Japan) S Aoyama (Japan) E Shibahara	6^{4}	6	[9]

Semifinals
WC	(United States) C Dolehide (United States) C Vandeweghe	6	6
6	(Croatia) D Jurak (Slovenia) A Klepač	3	4
