= 2024 Koser Jewelers Tennis Challenge =

Tennis tournament

- Date: 5–11 August 2024
- Edition: 17th
- Category: ITF Women's World Tennis Tour
- Prize money: $100,000
- Surface: Hard / Outdoor
- Location: Landisville, United States

Champions

Singles
- (United States) McCartney Kessler

Doubles
- Not completed
← 2023 ·	Koser Jewelers Tennis Challenge	· 2025 →

The 2024 Koser Jewelers Tennis Challenge was a professional tennis tournament played on outdoor hard courts. It was the seventeenth edition of the tournament, which was part of the 2024 ITF Women's World Tennis Tour. It took place in Landisville, Pennsylvania, United States, between 5 and 11 August 2024.

== Champions ==
=== Singles ===
- (United States) McCartney Kessler def. (Australia) Olivia Gadecki, 4–6, 6–2, 6–4

=== Doubles ===
- Doubles competition was abandoned due to poor weather

== Singles main draw entrants ==
=== Seeds ===
Country	Player	Rank	Seed
MEX	Renata Zarazúa	95	1
	Kamilla Rakhimova	105	2
JPN	Mai Hontama	108	3
USA	Ann Li	114	4
USA	McCartney Kessler	115	5
AUS	Maya Joint	140	6
CZE	Linda Fruhvirtová	141	7
FRA	Jessika Ponchet	146	8

- Rankings are as of 29 July 2024.

=== Other entrants ===
The following players received wildcards into the singles main draw:

- (United States) Sophie Chang
- (United States) Elizabeth Ionescu
- (United States) Maria Mateas
- (United States) Mary Stoiana

The following players received entry into the singles main draw as special exempts:

- (Thailand) Mananchaya Sawangkaew
- (China) Wei Sijia

The following players received entry from the qualifying draw:

- (United States) Robin Anderson
- (United States) Hanna Chang
- (Canada) Kayla Cross
- (Japan) Sayaka Ishii
- (China) Ma Yexin
- (Japan) Himeno Sakatsume
- (United States) Katrina Scott
- Iryna Shymanovich
