= WTA 500 tournaments =

Tournament category in women's tennis

WTA 500 tournaments is a category of tennis tournaments in the WTA Tour, implemented since the reorganization of the schedule in 2021.

At their introduction in 2021, WTA 500 tournaments' prize money was approximately $500,000. Since then, prize money awarded by WTA 500 events has grown less uniform, with one tournament's prize money rising to as much as $1.5 million.

The ranking points awarded to the winners of these tournaments are 500. This compares to 2,000 points for winning a Grand Slam tournament ("major"), up to 1,500 points for winning the WTA Finals, 1000 points for winning a WTA 1000 tournament, and 250 for winning a WTA 250 tournament.

== Historic names ==
- 1990–2008: WTA Tier II
- 2009–2020: WTA Premier
- 2021–present: WTA 500

== WTA points ==
The following ranking points are as of 2024.

| Event | | W | F | SF | QF | R16 | R32 | R64 | Q | Q2 | Q1 |
| Singles | 48 | 500 | 325 | 195 | 108 | 60 | 32 | 1 (Note: Players with byes receive first round points.) | 25 | 13 | 1 |
| Singles | 30/28 | 500 | 325 | 195 | 108 | 60 | 1 | N/A | 25 | 13 | 1 |
| Doubles | 24 | 500 | 325 | 195 | 108 | 60 | 1 | N/A | | | |
| Doubles | 16 | 500 | 325 | 195 | 108 | 1 | N/A | | | | |

== Events ==
=== Current ===
| Tournament | Location | Venue | Surface | Draw | Prize money | Date |
|---|---|---|---|---|---|---|
| Brisbane International | Brisbane, Australia | Queensland Tennis Centre | Hard | 48 | $1,691,602 (2026) | 5–11 January |
| Adelaide International | Adelaide, Australia | Memorial Drive Tennis Centre | Hard | 30 | $1,206,446 (2026) | 12–17 January |
| Abu Dhabi Open | Abu Dhabi, UAE | Abu Dhabi International Tennis Centre | Hard | 28 | $1,206,446 (2026) | 1–7 February |
| Mérida Open | Mérida, Mexico | Yucatan Country Club | Hard | 28 | $1,206,446 (2026) | 23 February–1 March |
| Charleston Open | Charleston, US | LTP-Daniel Island | Clay | 48 | $2,300,000 (2026) | 30 March–5 April |
| Upper Austria Ladies Linz | Linz, Austria | Design Center Linz | Clay (i) | 28 | €1,049,083 (2026) | 6–12 April |
| Porsche Tennis Grand Prix | Stuttgart, Germany | Porsche Arena | Clay (i) | 28 | €1,049,083 (2026) | 13–20 April |
| Internationaux de Strasbourg | Strasbourg, France | Tennis Club de Strasbourg | Clay | 28 | €1,049,083 (2026) | 18–24 May |
| Queen's Club Championships | London, UK | Queen's Club | Grass | 28 | $1,915,000 (2026) | 9–15 June |
| Berlin Tennis Open | Berlin, Germany | Rot-Weiss Tennis Club | Grass | 28 | €1,206,446 (2026) | 16–22 June |
| Bad Homburg Open | Bad Homburg, Germany | TC Bad Homburg | Grass | 28 | €1,049,083 (2026) | 23–29 June |
| Washington Open | Washington, D.C., US | William H.G. FitzGerald Tennis Center | Hard | 28 | $1,637,982 (2026) | 27 July–2 Aug |
| Monterrey Open | Monterrey, Mexico | Club Sonoma | Hard | 28 | $1,206,446 (2026) | 18–23 August |
| Guadalajara Open | Zapopan, Mexico | Centro Panamericano de Tenis | Hard | 28 | $1,206,446 (2026) | 13–19 September |
| Singapore Tennis Open | Singapore | OCBC Arena at The Kallang | Hard | 28 | $1,206,446 (2026) | 21–27 September |
| Ningbo Open | Ningbo, China | Ningbo Tennis Center | Hard | 28 | $1,206,446 (2026) | 13–19 October |
| Pan Pacific Open | Tokyo, Japan | Ariake Coliseum | Hard | 28 | $1,206,446 (2026) | 20–26 October |

Location map of current WTA 500 events

=== Former ===
| Tournament | Location | Venue | Surface | Status |
|---|---|---|---|---|
| Korea Open (2024–2025) (Note: Downgraded to WTA 250 starting in 2026) | Seoul, South Korea | Seoul Olympic Park Tennis Center | Hard | WTA 250 |
| San Diego Open (1971–2024) | San Diego, US | Barnes Tennis Center | Hard | ATP Challenger |
| Eastbourne International (1974–2024) | Eastbourne, UK | Devonshire Park Lawn Tennis Club | Grass | WTA 250 |
| Zhengzhou Open (2014–2023) | Zhengzhou, China | Zhongyuan Tennis Training Center | Hard | Defunct |
| Qatar Open (2001–2023) (Note: From 2011–2024, the Qatar Open and Dubai Championships alternated between WTA 1000 and WTA 500 status until both became full–time WTA 1000 tournaments in 2024.) | Doha, Qatar | Khalifa International Tennis and Squash Complex | Hard | WTA 1000 |
| Sydney International (1885–2022) | Sydney, Australia | Sydney Olympic Park Tennis Centre | Hard | Defunct |
| Silicon Valley Classic (1971–2022) | San Jose, US | San Jose State University | Hard | Defunct |
| Ostrava Open (1999–2022) (Note: Downgraded to WTA 250 starting in 2026) | Ostrava, Czech Republic | Ostravar Aréna | Hard (i) | WTA 250 |
| Dubai Championships (2001–2023) | Dubai, UAE | Aviation Club Tennis Centre | Hard | WTA 1000 |
| St. Petersburg Trophy (2003–2022) | Saint Petersburg, Russia | Sibur Arena | Hard (i) | Defunct |
| Kremlin Cup (1996–2021) | Moscow, Russia | Luzhniki Palace of Sports | Hard (i) | Defunct |
| Chicago Classic (2021) | Chicago, United States | XS Tennis Village | Hard | Defunct |

== Singles champions ==
=== WTA Tier II ===
| Tournament | 1990 | 1991 | 1992 | 1993 | 1994 | 1995 | 1996 | 1997 | 1998 | 1999 |
|---|---|---|---|---|---|---|---|---|---|---|
| Sydney | WTA Tier III | | | Capriati (1/2) | Date (1/2) | Sabatini (6/6) | Seles (13/21) | Hingis (3/16) | Sánchez Vicario (12/12) | Davenport (8/26) |
| Tokyo (Pan Pacific) | Graf (1/25) | Sabatini (2/6) | Sabatini (4/6) | WTA Tier I | | | | | | |
| Paris | Not an event | | | Navratilova (11/15) | Navratilova (15/15) | Graf (20/25) | Halard-Decugis (1/2) | Hingis (4/16) | Pierce (3/5) | S. Williams (1/18) |
| Essen/Hanover | Not an event | | Seles (7/21) | Medvedeva (1/1) | Novotná (4/11) | Not an event | Majoli (2/4) | Majoli (3/4) | Schnyder (1/1) | Novotná (11/11) |
| Washington D.C. | Navratilova (1/15) | Sánchez Vicario (1/12) | Not an event | | | | | | | |
| Indian Wells (Note: Held in Palm Springs from 1991 to 1993.) | Navratilova (2/15) | Navratilova (4/15) | Seles (8/21) | Fernández (3/5) | Graf (17/25) | Fernández (4/5) | WTA Tier I | | | |
| Boca Raton (Note: Held in Delray Beach from 1993–95.) | Sabatini (1/6) | WTA Tier I | | Graf (14/25) | Graf (18/25) | Graf (21/25) | Not an event | | | |
| Amelia Island | Graf (2/25) | Sabatini (3/6) | Sabatini (5/6) | Sánchez Vicario (2/12) | Sánchez Vicario (5/12) | Martínez (4/7) | Spîrlea (1/1) | Davenport (2/26) | Pierce (4/5) | Seles (19/21) |
| Houston | WTA Tier III | Seles (3/21) | Seles (9/21) | Martínez (1/7) | Hack (1/1) | Graf (22/25) | Not an event | | | |
| Barcelona | WTA Tier IV | WTA Tier III | | Sánchez Vicario (3/12) | Sánchez Vicario (6/12) | Sánchez Vicario (10/12) | Not an event | | | |
| Madrid | Not an event | | | | | | Novotná (5/11) | WTA Tier III | | |
| Hamburg | Graf (3/25) | Graf (7/25) | Graf (10/25) | Sánchez Vicario (4/12) | Sánchez Vicario (7/12) | Martínez (5/7) | Sánchez Vicario (11/12) | Majoli (4/4) | Hingis (9/16) | V. Williams (1/18) |
| Eastbourne | Navratilova (3/15) | Navratilova (5/15) | McNeil (1/1) | Navratilova (12/15) | McGrath (1/1) | Tauziat (1/3) | Seles (14/21) | Abandoned (Note: The final between Jana Novotná vs. Arantxa Sánchez Vicario was abandoned at 6-5 due to rain.) | Novotná (10/11) | Zvereva (2/2) |
| Oakland/Stanford (Note: Moved to Stanford from 1997 onwards.) | Seles (1/21) | Navratilova (6/15) | Seles (10/21) | Navratilova (13/15) | Sánchez Vicario (8/12) | Mag. Maleeva (1/2) | Hingis (2/16) | Hingis (5/16) | Davenport (5/26) | Davenport (9/26) |
| San Diego | WTA Tier III | | | Graf (15/25) | Graf (19/25) | Martínez (6/7) | Date (2/2) | Hingis (6/16) | Davenport (6/26) | Hingis (10/16) |
| Los Angeles | Seles (2/21) | Seles (4/21) | Navratilova (8/15) | Navratilova (14/15) | Frazier (1/1) | Martínez (7/7) | Davenport (1/26) | Seles (16/21) | Davenport (7/26) | S. Williams (2/18) |
| New Haven (Note: Was held in Stratton Mountain for 1993–94 and Atlanta for 1997.) | WTA Tier III | | | Martínez (2/7) | Martínez (3/7) | Not an event | | Davenport (3/26) | Graf (23/25) | V. Williams (2/18) |
| Tokyo (Nichirei) | Fernández (1/5) | Seles (5/21) | Seles (11/21) | Coetzer (1/1) | Sánchez Vicario (9/12) | Pierce (2/5) | Seles (15/21) | Not an event | | |
| Tokyo (Princess) | Not an event | | | | | | | Seles (17/21) | Seles (18/21) | Davenport (10/26) |
| Filderstadt | Fernández (2/5) | Huber (1/4) | Navratilova (9/15) | Pierce (1/5) | Huber (2/4) | Majoli (1/4) | Hingis (1/16) | Hingis (7/16) | Testud (1/1) | Hingis (11/16) |
| Zurich | Graf (4/25) | Graf (8/25) | Graf (11/25) | WTA Tier I | | | | | | |
| Linz | ITF Women's Circuit | WTA Tier V | | WTA Tier III | | | | | Novotná (9/11) | Pierce (5/5) |
| Leipzig | WTA Tier III | | | Graf (16/25) | Novotná (2/11) | Huber (3/4) | Huber (4/4) | Novotná (8/11) | Graf (24/25) | Tauziat (2/3) |
| Brighton | Graf (5/25) | Graf (9/25) | Graf (12/25) | Novotná (1/11) | Novotná (3/11) | Fernández (5/5) | Not an event | | | |
| Chicago | WTA Tier I | Navratilova (7/15) | Navratilova (10/15) | Seles (12/21) | Zvereva (1/2) | Mag. Maleeva (2/2) | Novotná (6/11) | Davenport (4/26) | Not an event | |
| Worcester | Graf (6/25) | Not an event | | | | | | | | |
| Philadelphia | Not an event | Seles (6/21) | Graf (13/25) | WTA Tier I | | | Novotná (7/11) | Hingis (8/16) | Graf (25/25) | Davenport (11/26) |

| Tournament | 2000 | 2001 | 2002 | 2003 | 2004 | 2005 | 2006 | 2007 | 2008 |
|---|---|---|---|---|---|---|---|---|---|
| Sydney | Mauresmo (1/15) | Hingis (14/16) | Hingis (16/16) | Clijsters (6/18) | Henin (4/18) | Molik (1/1) | Henin (7/18) | Clijsters (18/18) | Henin (16/18) |
| Paris | Tauziat (3/3) | Mauresmo (2/15) | V. Williams (9/18) | S. Williams (9/18) | Clijsters (10/18) | Safina (1/2) | Mauresmo (12/15) | Petrova (5/5) | Chakvetadze (2/2) |
| Hanover | S. Williams (3/18) | Not an event | | | | | | | |
| Nice | Not an event | Mauresmo (3/15) | Not an event | | | | | | |
| Antwerp | Not an event | | V. Williams (10/18) | V. Williams (15/18) | Clijsters (11/18) | Mauresmo (10/15) | Mauresmo (13/15) | Mauresmo (14/15) | Henin (17/18) |
| Dubai | Not an event | Hingis (15/16) | Mauresmo (5/15) | Henin (2/18) | Henin (5/18) | Davenport (23/26) | Henin (8/18) | Henin (11/18) | Dementieva (4/7) |
| Doha | Not an event | WTA Tier III | | | Myskina (3/3) | Sharapova (1/7) | Petrova (2/5) | Henin (12/18) | WTA Tier I |
| Bangalore | Not an event | | | WTA Tier IV | | | WTA Tier III | | S. Williams (11/18) |
| Scottsdale | Abandoned (Note: The final between Martina Hingis vs. Lindsay Davenport was abandoned due to rain.) | Davenport (14/26) | S. Williams (6/18) | Sugiyama (1/1) | Not an event | | | | |
| Amelia Island | Seles (20/21) | Mauresmo (4/15) | V. Williams (11/18) | Dementieva (1/7) | Davenport (19/26) | Davenport (24/26) | Petrova (3/5) | Golovin (1/1) | Sharapova (3/7) |
| Hamburg | Hingis (12/16) | V. Williams (6/18) | Clijsters (4/18) | Not an event | | | | | |
| Warsaw | WTA Tier IV | Not an event | WTA Tier III | Mauresmo (6/15) | V. Williams (16/18) | Henin (6/18) | Clijsters (16/18) | Henin (13/18) | Not an event |
| Eastbourne | Halard-Decugis (2/2) | Davenport (15/26) | Rubin (1/3) | Rubin (3/3) | Kuznetsova (1/8) | Clijsters (12/18) | Henin (9/18) | Henin (14/18) | Radwańska (1/7) |
| Stanford | V. Williams (3/18) | Clijsters (2/18) | V. Williams (12/18) | Clijsters (7/18) | Davenport (20/26) | Clijsters (13/18) | Clijsters (17/18) | Chakvetadze (1/2) | Wozniak (1/1) |
| San Diego | V. Williams (4/18) | V. Williams (7/18) | V. Williams (13/18) | Henin (3/18) | WTA Tier I | | | | Not an event |
| Los Angeles | S. Williams (4/18) | Davenport (16/26) | Rubin (2/3) | Clijsters (8/18) | Davenport (21/26) | Clijsters (14/18) | Dementieva (3/7) | Ivanovic (1/5) | Safina (2/2) |
| New Haven | V. Williams (5/18) | V. Williams (8/18) | V. Williams (14/18) | Capriati (2/2) | Bovina (1/1) | Davenport (25/26) | Henin (10/18) | Kuznetsova (3/8) | Wozniacki (1/11) |
| Bahia | WTA Tier IV | Seles (21/21) | Myskina (1/3) | Not an event | | | | | |
| Tokyo (Princess) | S. Williams (5/18) | Dokić (1/1) | S. Williams (7/18) | Not an event | | | | | |
| Beijing (Note: Held in Shanghai for 2003.) | WTA Tier IV | | | Dementieva (2/7) | S. Williams (10/18) | Kirilenko (1/1) | Kuznetsova (2/8) | Szávay (1/1) | Janković (1/2) |
| Luxembourg | WTA Tier III | | | | | Clijsters (15/18) | Bondarenko (1/1) | Ivanovic (2/5) | WTA Tier III |
| Filderstadt/Stuttgart (Note: Moved to Stuttgart from 2006 onwards.) | Hingis (13/16) | Davenport (17/26) | Clijsters (5/18) | Clijsters (9/18) | Davenport (22/26) | Davenport (26/26) | Petrova (4/5) | Henin (15/18) | Janković (2/2) |
| Zurich | WTA Tier I | | | | | | | | V. Williams (17/18) |
| Linz | Davenport (12/26) | Davenport (18/26) | Henin (1/18) | Sugiyama (2/2) | Mauresmo (8/15) | Petrova (1/5) | Sharapova (2/7) | Hantuchová (1/1) | Ivanovic (3/5) |
| Leipzig | Clijsters (1/18) | Clijsters (3/18) | S. Williams (8/18) | Myskina (2/3) | Not an event | | | | |
| Philadelphia | Davenport (13/26) | Not an event | | Mauresmo (7/15) | Mauresmo (9/15) | Mauresmo (11/15) | Not an event | | |

=== WTA Premier ===
| Tournament | 2009 | 2010 | 2011 | 2012 | 2013 | 2014 | 2015 | 2016 | 2017 | 2018 | 2019 | 2020 |
|---|---|---|---|---|---|---|---|---|---|---|---|---|
| Brisbane | WTA International | | | Kanepi (1/2) | S. Williams (15/18) | S. Williams (17/18) | Sharapova (7/7) | Azarenka (4/4) | Plíšková (1/9) | Svitolina (1/2) | Plíšková (6/9) | Plíšková (9/9) |
| Sydney | Dementieva (5/7) | Dementieva (6/7) | Li (1/1) | Azarenka (3/4) | Radwańska (5/7) | Pironkova (1/1) | Kvitová (5/14) | Kuznetsova (7/8) | Konta (2/2) | Kerber (7/7) | Kvitová (10/14) | Not an event |
| Adelaide | Not an event | | | | | | | | | | | Barty (2/5) |
| Paris | Mauresmo (15/15) | Dementieva (7/7) | Kvitová (1/14) | Kerber (1/7) | Barthel (1/1) | Pavlyuchenkova (1/2) | Not an event | | | | | |
| Antwerp | Exhibition event | | | | | | Petkovic (2/2) | Not an event | | | | |
| St. Petersburg | Not an event | | | | | | ITF Women's Circuit | Vinci (1/1) | Mladenovic (1/1) | Kvitová (8/14) | Bertens (2/3) | Bertens (3/3) |
| Doha | Not an event | | Zvonareva (1/1) | WTA Premier 5 | | | Šafářová (1/1) | WTA Premier 5 | Plíšková (2/9) | WTA Premier 5 | Mertens (1/2) | WTA Premier 5 |
| Dubai | WTA Premier 5 | | | Radwańska (3/7) | Kvitová (3/14) | V. Williams (18/18) | WTA Premier 5 | Errani (1/1) | WTA Premier 5 | Svitolina (2/2) | WTA Premier 5 | Halep (3/3) |
| Charleston | Lisicki (1/1) | Stosur (1/2) | Wozniacki (5/11) | S. Williams (13/18) | S. Williams (16/18) | Petkovic (1/2) | Kerber (2/7) | Stephens (1/1) | Kasatkina (1/6) | Bertens (1/3) | Keys (4/7) | Cancelled due to COVID-19 |
| Stuttgart | Kuznetsova (4/8) | Henin (18/18) | Görges (1/2) | Sharapova (4/7) | Sharapova (5/7) | Sharapova (6/7) | Kerber (3/7) | Kerber (6/7) | Siegemund (1/1) | Plíšková (4/9) | Kvitová (11/14) | Cancelled due to COVID-19 |
| Warsaw | Dulgheru (1/2) | Dulgheru (2/2) | Not an event | | | | | | | | | |
| Brussels | Not an event | | Wozniacki (6/11) | Radwańska (4/7) | Kanepi (2/2) | Not an event | | | | | | |
| Birmingham | WTA International | | | | | Ivanovic (4/5) | Kerber (4/7) | Keys (2/7) | Kvitová (7/14) | Kvitová (9/14) | Barty (1/5) | WTA International |
| Berlin | Not an event | | | | | | | | | | | Cancelled |
| Eastbourne | Wozniacki (2/11) | Makarova (1/1) | Bartoli (2/2) | Paszek (1/1) | Vesnina (1/1) | Keys (1/7) | Bencic (1/7) | Cibulková (4/4) | Plíšková (3/9) | Wozniacki (11/11) | Plíšková (7/9) | Cancelled |
| Stanford/San Jose (Note: Moved to San Jose from 2018 onwards.) | Bartoli (1/2) | Azarenka (1/4) | S. Williams (12/18) | S. Williams (14/18) | Cibulková (3/4) | S. Williams (18/18) | Kerber (5/7) | Konta (1/2) | Keys (3/7) | Buzărnescu (1/1) | S. Zheng (1/1) | Cancelled |
| Los Angeles | Pennetta (1/1) | Not an event | | | | | | | | | | |
| San Diego/Carlsbad (Note: Moved to Carlsbad from 2011–2013.) | Not an event | Kuznetsova (5/8) | Radwańska (2/7) | Cibulková (2/4) | Stosur (2/2) | Not an event | WTA 125K | Not an event | | | | |
| New Haven | Wozniacki (3/11) | Wozniacki (4/11) | Wozniacki (7/11) | Kvitová (2/14) | Halep (1/3) | Kvitová (4/14) | Kvitová (6/14) | Radwańska (7/7) | Gavrilova (1/1) | Sabalenka (1/6) | Not an event | |
| Zhengzhou | Not an event | | | | | ITF Women's Circuit | | | WTA 125K | | Plíšková (8/9) | Cancelled |
| Tokyo | WTA Premier 5 | | | | | Ivanovic (5/5) | Radwańska (6/7) | Wozniacki (9/11) | Wozniacki (10/11) | Plíšková (5/9) | Osaka (1/1) | Cancelled |
| Ostrava | Not an event | | | | | | | | | | | Sabalenka (2/6) |
| Moscow | Schiavone (1/1) | Azarenka (2/4) | Cibulková (1/4) | Wozniacki (8/11) | Halep (2/3) | Pavlyuchenkova (2/2) | Kuznetsova (6/8) | Kuznetsova (8/8) | Görges (2/2) | Kasatkina (2/6) | Bencic (2/7) | Cancelled |

=== WTA 500 ===
| Tournament | 2021 | 2022 | 2023 | 2024 | 2025 | 2026 |
|---|---|---|---|---|---|---|
| Brisbane | Cancelled | | Not an event | Rybakina (1/7) | Sabalenka (5/6) | Sabalenka (6/6) |
| Sydney | Cancelled | Badosa (1/2) | Not an event | | | |
| Melbourne 1 | Barty (3/5) | WTA 250 | Not an event | | | |
| Melbourne 2 | Mertens (2/2) | WTA 250 | Not an event | | | |
| Melbourne 3 | Abandoned (Note: The final between Anett Kontaveit vs. Ann Li was abandoned due to a delay in schedule.) | Not an event | | | | |
| Adelaide | Świątek (1/6) | Barty (5/5) | Sabalenka (Note: Competed under a neutral flag due to the Russian invasion of Ukraine.) (4/6) | Ostapenko (3/5) | Keys (7/7) | Andreeva (1/2) |
| Adelaide 2 | Not an event | WTA 250 | Bencic (4/7) | Not an event | | |
| Abu Dhabi | Sabalenka (3/6) | Not an event | Bencic (5/7) | Rybakina (2/7) | Bencic (6/7) | Bejlek (1/1) |
| St. Petersburg | Kasatkina (3/6) | Kontaveit (3/3) | Suspended due to Russian invasion of Ukraine | | | |
| Doha | Kvitová (12/14) | WTA 1000 | Świątek (4/6) | WTA 1000 | | |
| Dubai | WTA 1000 | Ostapenko (2/5) | WTA 1000 | | | |
| San Diego | Not an event | Świątek (3/6) | Krejčíková (2/2) | Boulter (1/1) | Not an event | |
| Merida | Not an event | | WTA 250 | | Navarro (1/2) | Bucșa (1/1) |
| Charleston | Kudermetova (1/2) | Bencic (3/7) | Jabeur (2/2) | Collins (2/2) | Pegula (2/4) | Pegula (4/4) |
| Linz | WTA 250 | | | Ostapenko (4/5) | Alexandrova (1/1) | Andreeva (2/2) |
| Stuttgart | Barty (4/5) | Świątek (2/6) | Świątek (5/6) | Rybakina (3/7) | Ostapenko (5/5) | Rybakina (6/7) |
| Strasbourg | WTA 250 | | | Keys (6/7) | Rybakina (4/7) | Navarro (2/2) |
| London | Not an event | | | | Maria (1/1) | Vekić (1/1) |
| Berlin | Samsonova (1/2) | Jabeur (1/2) | Kvitová (14/14) | Pegula (1/4) | Vondroušová (1/1) | Nosková (2/2) |
| Eastbourne | Ostapenko (1/5) | Kvitová (13/14) | Keys (5/7) | Kasatkina (5/6) | WTA 250 | |
| Bad Homburg | WTA 250 | | | Shnaider (1/3) | Pegula (3/4) | Muchová (1/1) |
| San Jose | Collins (1/2) | Kasatkina (4/6) | Not an event | | | |
| Washington | Exhibition event | WTA 250 | Gauff (1/1) | Badosa (2/2) | Fernandez (1/2) | Eala (1/1) |
| Monterrey | WTA 250 | | | Nosková (1/2) | Shnaider (2/3) | Parry (1/1) |
| Guadalajara | Not an event | WTA 1000 | | Fręch (1/1) | Jovic (1/2) | Jovic (2/2) |
| Seoul | WTA 125 | WTA 250 | | Haddad Maia (1/1) | Świątek (6/6) | WTA 250 |
| Singapore | Not an event | | | | WTA 250 | Fernandez (2/2) |
| Zhengzhou | Cancelled due to COVID-19 | Cancelled due to COVID-19 | Q. Zheng (1/2) | Not an event | | |
| Ningbo | Cancelled due to COVID-19 | Cancelled due to COVID-19 | WTA 250 | Kasatkina (6/6) | Rybakina (5/7) | Rybakina (7/7) |
| Tokyo | Cancelled due to COVID-19 | Samsonova (2/2) | Kudermetova (2/2) | Q. Zheng (2/2) | Bencic (7/7) | Shnaider (3/3) |
| Ostrava | Kontaveit (1/3) | Krejčíková (1/2) | Not an event | | | WTA 250 |
| Chicago (Fall) | Muguruza (1/1) | Not an event | | | | |
| Moscow | Kontaveit (2/3) | Suspended due to Russian invasion of Ukraine | | | | |

== Doubles champions ==
=== WTA Tier II ===
| Tournament | 1990 | 1991 | 1992 | 1993 | 1994 | 1995 | 1996 | 1997 | 1998 | 1999 |
|---|---|---|---|---|---|---|---|---|---|---|
| Sydney | WTA Tier III | | | Shriver (4/5); Smylie (3/5) | Fendick (4/5); McGrath (3/8) | Davenport (3/20); Novotná (16/26) | Davenport (6/20); MJ. Fernandez (7/8) | G. Fernandez (23/23); Sánchez Vicario (23/31) | Hingis (7/20); Suková (16/16) | Likhovtseva (3/10); Sugiyama (4/16) |
| Tokyo (Pan Pacific) | G. Fernandez (1/23); Smylie (1/5) | Jordan (1/1); Smylie (2/5) | Sánchez Vicario (3/31); Suková (6/16) | WTA Tier I | | | | | | |
| Paris | Not an event | | | Novotná (12/26); Strnadová (2/2) | Appelmans (1/2); Courtois (1/1) | McGrath (5/8); Neiland (12/19) | Boogert (1/1); Novotná (19/26) | Hingis (2/20); Novotná (23/26) | Appelmans (2/2); Oremans (1/1) | Spîrlea (1/2); Vis (2/4) |
| Essen/Hanover | Not an event | | K. Maleeva (1/1); Rittner (1/2) | Sánchez Vicario (9/31); Suková (14/16) | Lindström (1/1); Strandlund (1/1) | Not an event | McGrath (8/8); Neiland (16/19) | Arendt (3/4); Bollegraf (6/7) | Raymond (7/35); Stubbs (7/27) | S. Williams (1/3); V. Williams (1/2) |
| Washington D.C. | Garrison (1/3); Navratilova (1/8) | Neiland (5/19); Novotná (6/26) | Not an event | | | | | | | |
| Indian Wells | Novotná (1/26); Suková (1/16) | Abandoned (Note: The tournament was abandoned due to rain.) | Kohde-Kilsch (1/1); Rehe (1/1) | Stubbs (2/27); Suková (10/16) | Davenport (1/20); Raymond (2/35) | Davenport (4/20); Raymond (3/35) | WTA Tier I | | | |
| Boca Raton | Novotná (2/26); Suková (2/16) | WTA Tier I | | G. Fernandez (10/23) (Belarus) Zvereva (9/25) | Novotná (13/26); Sánchez Vicario (10/31) | MJ. Fernandez (5/8); Novotná (17/26) | Not an event | | | |
| Amelia Island | Paz (1/1); Sánchez Vicario (1/31) | Sánchez Vicario (2/31); Suková (5/16) | Sánchez Vicario (4/31) (Commonwealth of Independent States) Zvereva (5/25) | Man. Maleeva (1/1); Meskhi (1/1) | Neiland (9/19); Sánchez Vicario (11/31) | Coetzer (1/3); Gorrochategui (1/1) | Rubin (2/5); Sánchez Vicario (19/31) | Davenport (9/20); Novotná (24/26) | Cacic (1/1); Pierce (3/5) | Martínez (3/5); Tarabini (1/3) |
| Houston | WTA Tier III | Hetherington (1/1); Rinaldi (1/1) | Fendick (2/5); G. Fernandez (7/23) | Adams (2/2); Bollegraf (2/7) | Bollegraf (3/7); Navratilova (5/8) | Arendt (1/4); Bollegraf (5/7) | Not an event | | | |
| Barcelona | WTA Tier IV | WTA Tier III | | Martínez (1/5); Sánchez Vicario (7/31) | Neiland (10/19); Sánchez Vicario (12/31) | Neiland (13/19); Sánchez Vicario (17/31) | Not an event | | | |
| Madrid | Not an event | | | | | | Novotná (20/26); Sánchez Vicario (21/31) | WTA Tier III | | |
| Hamburg | G. Fernandez (2/23); Navratilova (2/8) | Neiland (2/19); Novotná (5/26) | Graf (1/2); Stubbs (1/27) | Graf (2/2); Stubbs (3/27) | Novotná (14/26); Sánchez Vicario (13/31) | G. Fernandez (18/23); Hingis (1/20) | Sánchez Vicario (20/31); Schultz (2/2) | A. Huber (1/1); Pierce (2/5) | Schett (1/5); Schnyder (1/5) | Neiland (17/19); Sánchez Vicario (26/31) |
| Eastbourne | Neiland (1/19) (Soviet Union) Zvereva (1/25) | Neiland (3/19) (Soviet Union) Zvereva (2/25) | Novotná (10/26); Neiland (7/19) | G. Fernandez (11/23) (Belarus) Zvereva (10/25) | G. Fernandez (16/23) (Belarus) Zvereva (14/25) | Novotná (18/26); Sánchez Vicario (18/31) | Novotná (21/26); Sánchez Vicario (22/31) | Abandoned (Note: The final was abandoned due to rain.) | de Swardt (1/1); Novotná (26/26) | Hingis (9/20); Kournikova (2/6) |
| Oakland/Stanford | McGrath (1/8); Smith (1/1) | Fendick (1/5); G. Fernandez (6/23) | G. Fernandez (8/23) (Commonwealth of Independent States) Zvereva (7/25) | Fendick (3/5); McGrath (2/8) | Davenport (2/20); Sánchez Vicario (16/31) | McNeil (1/2); Suková (15/16) | Davenport (8/20); MJ. Fernandez (8/8) | Davenport (10/20); Hingis (3/20) | Davenport (11/20) (Belarus) Zvereva (20/25) | Davenport (14/20); Morariu (1/3) |
| San Diego | WTA Tier III | | | G. Fernandez (12/23); Suková (12/16) | Novotná (15/26); Sánchez Vicario (14/31) | G. Fernandez (19/23) (Belarus) Zvereva (16/25) | G. Fernandez (22/23); Martínez (2/5) | Hingis (4/20); Sánchez Vicario (24/31) | Davenport (12/20) (Belarus) Zvereva (21/25) | Davenport (15/20); Morariu (2/3) |
| Los Angeles | G. Fernandez (3/23); Novotná (3/26) | Neiland (4/19) (Soviet Union) Zvereva (3/25) | Sánchez Vicario (5/31); Suková (7/16) | Sánchez Vicario (8/31); Suková (13/16) | Halard-Decugis (1/6); Tauziat (2/9) | G. Fernandez (20/23) (Belarus) Zvereva (17/25) | Davenport (7/20) (Belarus) Zvereva (19/25) | Basuki (1/2); Vis (1/4) | Hingis (8/20) (Belarus) Zvereva (22/25) | Sánchez Vicario (27/31); Neiland (18/19) |
| New Haven | WTA Tier III | | | Smylie (4/5); Suková (11/16) | Shriver (5/5); Smylie (5/5) | Not an event | | Arendt (4/4); Bollegraf (7/7) | Fusai (3/3); Tauziat (6/9) | Raymond (8/35); Stubbs (8/27) |
| Tokyo (Nichirei) | MJ. Fernández (1/8); White (1/2) | MJ. Fernández (3/8); Shriver (1/5) | MJ. Fernández (4/8); White (1/2) | Raymond (1/35); Rubin (1/5) | Halard-Decugis (2/6); Sánchez Vicario (15/31) | MJ. Fernández (6/8); Davenport (5/20) | Coetzer (2/3); Pierce (1/5) | Not an event | | |
| Tokyo (Princess) | Not an event | | | | | | | Seles (1/2); Sugiyama (1/16) | Seles (2/2); Kournikova (1/6) | Martínez (4/5); Tarabini (2/3) |
| Filderstadt | MJ. Fernández (2/8); Garrison (2/3) | Navratilova (3/8); Novotná (8/26) | Sánchez Vicario (6/31); Suková (9/16) | G. Fernandez (14/23) (Belarus) Zvereva (12/25) | G. Fernandez (17/23) (Belarus) Zvereva (15/25) | G. Fernandez (21/23) (Belarus) Zvereva (18/25) | Arendt (2/4); Novotná (22/26) | Hingis (6/20); Sánchez Vicario (25/31) | Davenport (13/20) (Belarus) Zvereva (23/25) | Rubin (3/5); Testud (1/3) |
| Zurich | Bollegraf (1/7); Pfaff (1/1) | Novotná (7/26); Strnadová (1/2) | Suková (8/16) (Commonwealth of Independent States) Zvereva (6/25) | WTA Tier I | | | | | | |
| Linz | ITF Women's Circuit | WTA Tier V | | WTA Tier III | | | | | Fusai (2/3); Tauziat (5/9) | Spîrlea (2/2); Vis (3/4) |
| Leipzig | WTA Tier III | | | G. Fernandez (13/23) (Belarus) Zvereva (11/25) | Fendick (5/5); McGrath (4/8) | McGrath (6/8); Neiland (14/19) | Boogert (1/1); Tauziat (3/9) | Hingis (5/20); Novotná (25/26) | Likhovtseva (1/10); Sugiyama (2/16) | Neiland (19/19); Pierce (4/5) |
| Brighton | Suková (3/16); Tauziat (1/9) | Shriver (2/5) (Soviet Union) Zvereva (4/25) | Novotná (11/26); Neiland (8/19) | Golarsa (1/1); Medvedeva (1/1) | Bollegraf (4/7); Neiland (11/19) | McGrath (7/8); Neiland (15/19) | Not an event | | | |
| Chicago | WTA Tier I | G. Fernandez (5/23); Novotná (4/26) | Navratilova (4/8); Shriver (3/5) | Adams (1/2); Garrison (3/3) | G. Fernandez (15/23) (Belarus) Zvereva (13/25) | Sabatini (1/1); Schultz (1/2) | Raymond (4/35); Stubbs (4/27) | Fusai (1/3); Tauziat (4/9) | Not an event | |
| Worcester | G. Fernandez (4/23); Suková (4/16) | Not an event | | | | | | | | |
| Philadelphia | Not an event | Neiland (6/19); Novotná (9/26) | G. Fernandez (9/23) (Commonwealth of Independent States) Zvereva (8/25) | WTA Tier I | | | Raymond (5/35); Stubbs (5/27) | Raymond (6/35); Stubbs (6/27) | Likhovtseva (2/10); Sugiyama (3/16) | Raymond (9/35); Stubbs (9/27) |

| Tournament | 2000 | 2001 | 2002 | 2003 | 2004 | 2005 | 2006 | 2007 | 2008 |
|---|---|---|---|---|---|---|---|---|---|
| Sydney | Halard-Decugis (3/6); Sugiyama (5/16) | Kournikova (6/6); Schett (2/5) | Raymond (14/35); Stubbs (13/27) | Clijsters (2/5); Sugiyama (9/16) | Black (6/23); Stubbs (19/27) | Stewart (1/2); Stosur (1/9) | Morariu (3/3); Stubbs (24/27) | Grönefeld (2/7); Shaughnessy (4/6) | Yan (2/3); J. Zheng (2/4) |
| Paris | Halard-Decugis (4/6); Testud (2/3) | Majoli (1/1); Razzano (1/1) | Dechy (1/1); Tu (1/1) | Schett (4/5); Schnyder (3/5) | Schett (5/5); Schnyder (4/5) | Benešová (1/5); Peschke (1/20) | Loit (3/3); Peschke (3/20) | Black (12/23); L. Huber (4/19) | A. Bondarenko (1/1); K. Bondarenko (1/1) |
| Hanover | Svensson (1/1) (Belarus) Zvereva (24/25) | Not an event | | | | | | | |
| Nice | Not an event | Loit (1/3); Sidot (2/2) | Not an event | | | | | | |
| Antwerp | Not an event | | Mag. Maleeva (1/2); Schnyder (2/5) | Clijsters (3/5); Sugiyama (10/16) | Black (7/23); Callens (2/3) | Black (9/23); Callens (3/3) | Safina (2/2); Srebotnik (1/14) | Black (13/23); L. Huber (5/19) | Black (16/23); L. Huber (8/19) |
| Dubai | Not an event | Basuki (2/2); Vis (4/4) | Rittner (2/2); Vento-Kabchi (1/2) | Kuznetsova (2/6); Navratilova (6/8) | Husárová (2/4); Martínez (5/5) | Ruano Pascual (3/6); Suárez (3/5) | Peschke (4/20); Schiavone (3/4) | Black (14/23); L. Huber (6/19) | Black (17/23); L. Huber (9/19) |
| Doha | Not an event | WTA Tier III | | | Kuznetsova (4/6); Likhovtseva (8/10) | Molik (3/3); Schiavone (2/4) | Hantuchová (4/4); Sugiyama (14/16) | Hingis (13/20); Kirilenko (1/4) | WTA Tier I |
| Bangalore | Not an event | | | WTA Tier IV | | | WTA Tier III | | P. Shuai (1/2); Tiantian (1/4) |
| Scottsdale | Abandoned (Note: The tournament was abandoned due to rain.) | Raymond (11/35); Stubbs (11/27) | Raymond (15/35); Stubbs (14/27) | Clijsters (4/5); Sugiyama (11/16) | Not an event | | | | |
| Amelia Island | Abandoned (Note: The tournament was abandoned due to rain.) | Martínez (4/5); Tarabini (3/3) | Hantuchová (1/4); Sánchez Vicario (29/31) | Davenport (18/20); Raymond (19/35) | Petrova (3/11); Shaughnessy (1/6) | Stewart (2/2); Stosur (2/9) | Asagoe (1/1); Srebotnik (2/14) | Santangelo (1/2); Srebotnik (3/14) | Mattek-Sands (1/13); Uhlířová (1/1) |
| Hamburg | Kournikova (3/6) (Belarus) Zvereva (25/25) | Black (1/23); Likhovtseva (4/10) | Hingis (12/20); Schett (3/5) | Not an event | | | | | |
| Warsaw | WTA Tier IV | Not an event | WTA Tier III | L. Huber (2/19); Mag. Maleeva (2/2) | Farina Elia (1/1); Schiavone (1/4) | Perebiynis (1/2); Strýcová (1/10) | Myskina (2/2); Likhovtseva (10/10) | Dushevina (1/1); Perebiynis (2/2) | Not an event |
| Eastbourne | Sugiyama (6/16); Tauziat (7/9) | Raymond (12/35); Stubbs (12/27) | Raymond (16/35); Stubbs (15/27) | Davenport (19/20); Raymond (20/35) | Molik (1/3); Serna (1/1) | Raymond (25/35); Stubbs (21/27) | Kuznetsova (5/6); Mauresmo (2/2) | Raymond (30/35); Stosur (7/9) | Black (18/23); L. Huber (10/19) |
| Stanford | Rubin (4/5); Testud (3/3) | Lee (1/1); Prakusya (1/1) | Raymond (17/35); Stubbs (16/27) | Black (5/23); Raymond (21/35) | Daniilidou (1/1); Pratt (2/2) | Black (10/23); Stubbs (22/27) | Grönefeld (1/7); Pe'er (1/2) | Mirza (1/17); Pe'er (2/2) | Black (19/23); L. Huber (11/19) |
| San Diego | Raymond (10/35); Stubbs (10/27) | Black (2/23); Likhovtseva (5/10) | Dementieva (1/2); Husárová (1/4) | Clijsters (5/5); Sugiyama (12/16) | WTA Tier I | | | | Not an event |
| Los Angeles | Callens (1/3); Monami (1/1) | Po (1/1); Tauziat (8/9) | Clijsters (1/5); Dokic (2/3) | Pierce (5/5); Stubbs (17/27) | Petrova (4/11); Shaughnessy (2/6) | Dementieva (2/2); Pennetta (1/4) | Ruano Pascual (4/6); Suárez (4/5) | Peschke (6/20); Stubbs (25/27) | L. Chan (1/7); Chuang (2/5) |
| New Haven | Halard-Decugis (5/6); Sugiyama (8/16) | Black (3/23); Likhovtseva (6/10) | Hantuchová (2/4); Sánchez Vicario (30/31) | Ruano Pascual (2/6); Suárez (2/5) | Petrova (5/11); Shaughnessy (3/6) | Raymond (26/35); Stosur (3/9) | Yan (1/3); J. Zheng (1/4) | Mirza (2/17); Santangelo (2/2) | Peschke (8/20); Raymond (31/35) |
| Bahia | WTA Tier IV | Coetzer (3/3); McNeil (2/2) | Ruano Pascual (1/6); Suárez (1/5) | Not an event | | | | | |
| Tokyo (Princess) | Halard-Decugis (6/6); Sugiyama (7/16) | Black (4/23); L. Huber (1/19) | Kuznetsova (1/6); Sánchez Vicario (31/31) | Not an event | | | | | |
| Beijing | WTA Tier IV | | | Loit (2/3); Pratt (1/2) | Gagliardi (1/1); Safina (1/2) | Llagostera Vives (1/4); Vento-Kabchi (2/2) | Ruano Pascual (5/6); Suárez (5/5) | Chuang (1/5); Hsieh (1/6) | Medina Garrigues (1/3); Wozniacki (1/1) |
| Luxembourg | WTA Tier III | | | | | Raymond (27/35); Stosur (4/9) | Peschke (5/20); Schiavone (4/4) | Benešová (2/5); Husárová (4/4) | WTA Tier III |
| Filderstadt/Stuttgart | Hingis (10/20); Kournikova (4/6) | Davenport (16/20); Raymond (13/35) | Davenport (17/20); Raymond (18/35) | Raymond (22/35); Stubbs (18/27) | Black (8/23); Stubbs (20/27) | Hantuchová (3/4); Myskina (1/2) | Raymond (28/35); Stosur (5/9) | Peschke (7/20); Stubbs (26/27) | Grönefeld (3/7); Schnyder (5/5) |
| Zurich | WTA Tier I | | | | | | | | Black (20/23); L. Huber (12/19) |
| Linz | Mauresmo (1/2); Rubin (5/5) | Dokic (1/3); Petrova (1/11) | Dokic (3/3); Petrova (2/11) | L. Huber (3/19); Sugiyama (13/16) | Husárová (3/4); Likhovtseva (9/10) | Dulko (1/3); Peschke (2/20) | Raymond (29/35); Stosur (6/9) | Black (15/23); L. Huber (7/19) | Srebotnik (4/14); Sugiyama (15/16) |
| Leipzig | Sánchez Vicario (28/31); Sidot (1/2) | Likhovtseva (7/10); Tauziat (9/9) | S. Williams (2/3); Stevenson (1/1) | Kuznetsova (3/6); Navratilova (7/8) | Not an event | | | | |
| Philadelphia | Hingis (11/20); Kournikova (5/6) | Not an event | | Navratilova (8/8); Raymond (23/35) | Molik (2/3); Raymond (24/35) | Black (11/23); Stubbs (23/27) | Not an event | | |

=== WTA Premier ===
| Tournament | 2009 | 2010 | 2011 | 2012 | 2013 | 2014 | 2015 | 2016 | 2017 | 2018 | 2019 | 2020 |
|---|---|---|---|---|---|---|---|---|---|---|---|---|
| Brisbane | WTA International | | | Llagostera Vives (3/4); Parra Santonja (1/2) | Mattek-Sands (7/13); Mirza (5/17) | Kudryavtseva (1/3); Rodionova (1/3) | Hingis (15/20); Lisicki (3/3) | Hingis (17/20); Mirza (11/17) | Mattek-Sands (11/13); Mirza (16/17) | Bertens (1/1); Schuurs (1/8) | Melichar (1/14); Peschke (17/20) | Hsieh (4/6); Strýcová (9/10) |
| Sydney | Hsieh (2/6); P. Shuai (2/2) | Black (22/23); L. Huber (14/19) | Benešová (4/5); Záhlavová-Strýcová (3/10) | Peschke (13/20); Srebotnik (9/14) | Petrova (10/11); Srebotnik (10/14) | Babos (1/7); Šafářová (3/5) | Mattek-Sands (9/13); Mirza (9/17) | Hingis (18/20); Mirza (12/17) | Babos (2/7); Pavlyuchenkova (2/2) | Dabrowski (2/7); Xu (3/7) | Krunić (1/2); Siniaková (1/7) | Not an event |
| Adelaide | Not an event | | | | | | | | | | | Melichar (4/14); Xu (5/7) |
| Paris | Black (21/23); L. Huber (13/19) | Benešová (3/5); Záhlavová-Strýcová (2/10) | Mattek-Sands (5/13); Shaughnessy (6/6) | L. Huber (17/19); Raymond (33/35) | Errani (1/3); Vinci (1/2) | Grönefeld (5/7); Peschke (15/20) | Not an event | | | | | |
| Antwerp | Exhibition event | | | | | | Medina Garrigues (3/3); Parra Santonja (2/4) | Not an event | | | | |
| St. Petersburg | Not an event | | | | | | ITF Women's Circuit | Hingis (19/20); Mirza (13/17) | Ostapenko (1/8); Rosolska (1/2) | Bacsinszky (1/1); Zvonareva (1/3) | Gasparyan (1/1); Makarova (2/2) | Aoyama (2/6); Shibahara (2/5) |
| Doha | Not an event | | Peschke (10/20); Srebotnik (6/14) | WTA Premier 5 | | | Kops-Jones (6/9); Spears (5/8) | WTA Premier 5 | Spears (7/8); Srebotnik (13/14) | WTA Premier 5 | H. Chan (3/6); L. Chan (5/7) | WTA Premier 5 |
| Dubai | WTA Premier 5 | | | L. Huber (18/19); Raymond (34/35) | Mattek-Sands (8/13); Mirza (6/17) | Kudryavtseva (2/3); Rodionova (2/3) | WTA Premier 5 | Chuang (5/5); Jurak (1/3) | WTA Premier 5 | H. Chan (2/6); Yang (1/2) | WTA Premier 5 | Hsieh (5/6); Strýcová (10/10) |
| Charleston | Mattek-Sands (2/13); Petrova (6/11) | L. Huber (15/19); Petrova (9/11) | Mirza (3/17); Vesnina (1/3) | Pavlyuchenkova (1/2); Šafářová (1/5) | Mladenovic (1/4); Šafářová (2/5) | Medina Garrigues (2/3); Shvedova (2/2) | Hingis (16/20); Mirza (10/17) | Garcia (2/4); Mladenovic (2/4) | Mattek-Sands (12/13); Šafářová (5/5) | Kudryavtseva (3/3); Srebotnik (14/14) | Grönefeld (7/7); Rosolska (2/2) | Cancelled due to COVID-19 |
| Stuttgart | Mattek-Sands (3/13); Petrova (7/11) | Dulko (2/3); Pennetta (2/4) | Lisicki (1/3); Stosur (8/9) | Benešová (5/5); Záhlavová-Strýcová (4/10) | Barthel (1/2); Lisicki (2/3) | Errani (2/3); Vinci (2/2) | Mattek-Sands (10/13); Šafářová (4/5) | Garcia (3/4); Mladenovic (3/4) | Atawo (8/9); Ostapenko (2/8) | Atawo (9/9); Grönefeld (6/7) | Barthel (2/2); Friedsam (1/1) | Cancelled due to COVID-19 |
| Warsaw | Kops-Jones (1/9); Mattek-Sands (4/13) | Ruano Pascual (6/6); Shaughnessy (5/6) | Not an event | | | | | | | | | |
| Brussels | Not an event | | Hlaváčková (1/4); Voskoboeva (1/1) | Mattek-Sands (6/13); Mirza (4/17) | Grönefeld (4/7); Peschke (14/20) | Not an event | | | | | | |
| Birmingham | WTA International | | | | | Kops-Jones (5/9); Spears (4/8) | Muguruza (2/3); Suárez Navarro (2/3) | Ka. Plíšková (1/1); Strýcová (5/10) | Barty (1/3); Dellacqua (1/1) | Babos (4/7); Mladenovic (4/4) | Hsieh (3/6); Strýcová (8/10) | WTA International |
| Berlin | Not an event | | | | | | | | | | | Cancelled |
| Eastbourne | Amanmuradova (1/1); Sugiyama (16/16) | Raymond (32/35); Stubbs (27/27) | Peschke (11/20); Srebotnik (7/14) | Llagostera Vives (4/4); Martínez Sánchez (2/3) | Petrova (11/11); Srebotnik (11/14) | H. Chan (1/6); L. Chan (2/7) | Garcia (1/4); Srebotnik (12/14) | Jurak (2/3); Rodionova (3/3) | L. Chan (3/7); Hingis (20/20) | Dabrowski (3/7); Xu (4/7) | H. Chan (4/6); L. Chan (6/7) | Cancelled |
| Stanford/San Jose | S. Williams (3/3); V. Williams (2/2) | Davenport (20/20); L. Huber (16/19) | Azarenka (1/2); Kirilenko (4/4) | Erakovic (1/1); Watson (1/1) | Kops-Jones (3/9); Spears (2/8) | Muguruza (1/3); Suárez Navarro (1/3) | Xu (1/7); S. Zheng (1/2) | Atawo (7/9); Spears (6/8) | Spears (8/8); Vandeweghe (1/1) | L. Chan (4/7); Peschke (16/20) | Melichar (2/14); Peschke (18/20) | Cancelled |
| Los Angeles | Chuang (3/5); Yan (3/3) | Not an event | | | | | | | | | | |
| San Diego/Carlsbad | Not an event | Kirilenko (3/4); J. Zheng (3/4) | Peschke (12/20); Srebotnik (8/14) | Kops-Jones (2/9); Spears (1/8) | Kops-Jones (4/9); Spears (3/8) | Not an event | WTA 125K | Not an event | | | | |
| New Haven | Llagostera Vives (2/4); Martínez Sánchez (1/3) | Peschke (9/20); Srebotnik (5/14) | Chuang (4/5); Govortsova (1/1) | L. Huber (19/19); Raymond (35/35) | Mirza (7/17); J. Zheng (4/4) | Klepač (1/4); Soler Espinosa (1/1) | Görges (1/1); Hradecká (1/2) | Mirza (14/17); Niculescu (1/3) | Dabrowski (1/7); Xu (2/7) | Sestini Hlaváčková (4/4); Strýcová (7/10) | Not an event | |
| Zhengzhou | Not an event | | | | | ITF Women's Circuit | | | WTA 125K | | Melichar (3/14); Peschke (19/20) | Cancelled |
| Tokyo | WTA Premier 5 | | | | | Black (23/23); Mirza (8/17) | Muguruza (3/3); Suárez Navarro (3/3) | Mirza (15/17); Strýcová (6/10) | Klepač (2/4); Martínez Sánchez (3/3) | Kato (1/1); Ninomiya (1/1) | H. Chan (5/6); L. Chan (7/7) | Cancelled |
| Ostrava | Not an event | | | | | | | | | | | Mertens (1/2); Sabalenka (1/2) |
| Moscow | Kirilenko (2/4); Petrova (8/11) | Dulko (3/3); Pennetta (3/4) | V. King (1/1); Shvedova (1/2) | Makarova (1/2); Vesnina (2/3) | Kuznetsova (6/6); Stosur (9/9) | Hingis (14/20); Pennetta (4/4) | Kasatkina (1/1); Vesnina (3/3) | Hlaváčková (2/4); Hradecká (2/2) | Babos (3/7); Hlaváčková (3/4) | Panova (1/3); Siegemund (1/2) | Aoyama (1/6); Shibahara (1/5) | Cancelled |

=== WTA 500 ===
| Tournament | 2021 | 2022 | 2023 | 2024 | 2025 | 2026 |
|---|---|---|---|---|---|---|
| Brisbane | Cancelled | | Not an event | L. Kichenok (1/2); Ostapenko (4/8) | Andreeva (1/1); Shnaider (1/1) | Hsieh (6/6); Ostapenko (8/8) |
| Sydney | Cancelled | Danilina (1/2); Haddad Maia (1/2) | Not an event | | | |
| Melbourne 1 | Aoyama (4/6); Shibahara (4/5) | WTA 250 | Not an event | | | |
| Melbourne 2 | Krejčíková (1/3); Siniaková (2/7) | WTA 250 | Not an event | | | |
| Adelaide | Guarachi (1/1); Krawczyk (1/7) | Barty (3/3); Hunter (1/2) | Muhammad (1/3); Townsend (1/5) | Haddad Maia (2/2); Townsend (3/5) | Guo (2/3); Panova (2/3) | Siniaková (7/7); Zhang (4/5) |
| Adelaide 2 | Not an event | WTA 250 | Stefani (1/7); Townsend (2/5) | Not an event | | |
| Linz | WTA 250 | | | Errani (3/4); Paolini (1/2) | Babos (5/7); Stefani (4/7) | Cîrstea (1/1); Zhang (5/5) |
| Abu Dhabi | Aoyama (3/6); Shibahara (3/5) | Not an event | Stefani (2/7); Zhang (2/5) | Kenin (1/1); Mattek-Sands (13/13) | Ostapenko (6/8); Perez (3/3) | Alexandrova (1/2); Joint (1/2) |
| St. Petersburg | N. Kichenok (1/1); Olaru (1/1) | Kalinskaya (1/1); McNally (1/3) | Suspended due to Russian invasion of Ukraine | | | |
| Doha | Melichar (5/14); Schuurs (2/8) | WTA 1000 | Gauff (2/2); Pegula (2/2) | WTA 1000 | | |
| Dubai | WTA 1000 | Kudermetova (1/2); Mertens (2/2) | WTA 1000 | | | |
| San Diego | Not an event | Gauff (1/2); Pegula (1/2) | Krejčíková (2/3); Siniaková (5/7) | Melichar-Martinez (7/14); Perez (1/3) | ITF Event | |
| Merida | Not an event | | WTA 250 | | Piter (1/1); Sherif (1/1) | Bucșa (3/4); Jiang (1/1) |
| Charleston | Melichar (6/14); Schuurs (3/8) | Klepač (4/4); Linette (1/2) | Collins (1/1); Krawczyk (3/7) | Krueger (1/1); Stephens (1/1) | Ostapenko (7/8); Routliffe (2/5) | Krawczyk (6/7); McNally (3/3) |
| Stuttgart | Barty (2/3); J. Brady (1/1) | Krawczyk (2/7); Schuurs (4/8) | Krawczyk (4/7); Schuurs (5/8) | H. Chan (6/6); Kudermetova (2/2) | Dabrowski (6/7); Routliffe (3/5) | Melichar-Martinez (13/14); Samsonova (3/3) |
| Strasbourg | WTA 250 | | | Bucșa (1/4); Niculescu (2/3) | Babos (6/7); Stefani (5/7) | Dabrowski (7/7); Stefani (7/7) |
| London | Not an event | | | | Muhammad (3/3); Schuurs (8/8) | Mihalíková (2/2); Nicholls (2/2) |
| Berlin | Azarenka (2/2); Sabalenka (2/2) | Hunter (2/2); Siniaková (4/7) | Garcia (4/4); Stefani (3/7) | X. Wang (1/1); S. Zheng (2/2) | Mihalíková (1/2); Nicholls (1/2) | Alexandrova (2/2); Nosková (1/1) |
| Eastbourne | Aoyama (5/6); Shibahara (5/5) | Krunić (2/2); Linette (2/2) | Krawczyk (5/7); Schuurs (6/8) | L. Kichenok (2/2); Ostapenko (5/8) | WTA 250 | |
| Bad Homburg | WTA 250 | | | Melichar-Martinez (8/14); Perez (2/3) | Guo (3/3); Panova (3/3) | Sutjiadi (1/3); Zvonareva (3/3) |
| San Jose | Jurak (3/3); Klepač (3/4) | Xu (6/7); Yang (2/2) | Not an event | | | |
| Washington | Exhibition event | WTA 250 | Siegemund (2/2); Zvonareva (2/3) | Muhammad (2/3); Townsend (4/5) | Townsend (5/5); Zhang (3/5) | Routliffe (4/5); Sutjiadi (2/3) |
| Monterrey | WTA 250 | | | Guo (1/3); Niculescu (3/3) | Bucșa (2/4); Melichar-Martinez (10/14) | Joint (2/2); Xu (7/7) |
| Guadalajara | Not an event | WTA 1000 | | Danilina (2/2); Khromacheva (1/2) | Khromacheva (2/2); Melichar-Martinez (11/14) | Bucșa (4/4); Melichar-Martinez (14/14) |
| Seoul | WTA 125 | WTA 250 | | Melichar-Martinez (9/14); Samsonova (1/3) | Krejčíková (3/3); Siniaková (6/7) | WTA 250 |
| Singapore | Not an event | | | | WTA 250 | Routliffe (5/5); Sutjiadi (3/3) |
| Zhengzhou | Cancelled due to COVID-19 | Cancelled due to COVID-19 | Dabrowski (5/7); Routliffe (1/5) | Not an event | | |
| Ningbo | Cancelled due to COVID-19 | Cancelled due to COVID-19 | WTA 250 | Schuurs (7/8); Yuan (1/1) | Melichar-Martinez (12/14); Samsonova (2/3) | Krawczyk (7/7); Stollár (1/1) |
| Tokyo | Dabrowski (4/7); Olmos (1/1) | Cancelled due to COVID-19 | Eikeri (1/1); Neel (1/1) | Aoyama (6/6); Hozumi (1/1) | Babos (7/7); Stefani (6/7) | Errani (4/4); Paolini (2/2) |
| Ostrava | Mirza (17/17); Zhang (1/5) | McNally (2/3); Parks (1/1) | Not an event | | | WTA 250 |
| Chicago (Fall) | Peschke (20/20); Petkovic (1/1) | Not an event | | | | |
| Moscow | Ostapenko (3/8); Siniaková (3/7) | Suspended due to Russian invasion of Ukraine | | | | |

== Statistics ==
=== Most titles ===
Bold face designates active players

| No. | Singles |
|---|---|
| 26 | Lindsay Davenport |
| 25 | Steffi Graf |
| 21 | / Monica Seles |
| 18 | Kim Clijsters |
| 18 | Justine Henin |
| 18 | Serena Williams |
| 18 | Venus Williams |
| 16 | Martina Hingis |
| 15 | Amélie Mauresmo |
| 15 | Martina Navratilova |
| 14 | Petra Kvitová |

| No. | Doubles |
|---|---|
| 35 | (United States) Lisa Raymond |
| 31 | (Spain) Arantxa Sánchez Vicario |
| 27 | (Australia) Rennae Stubbs |
| 26 | (Czechoslovakia) / Jana Novotná |
| 25 | (Soviet Union) /// Natasha Zvereva |
| 23 | (United States) Gigi Fernández |
| 23 | (Zimbabwe) Cara Black |
| 20 | (United States) Lindsay Davenport |
| 20 | (Switzerland) Martina Hingis |
| 20 | (Czech Republic) Květa Peschke |
| 19 | (Soviet Union) / (Latvia) Larisa Neiland |
| 19 | / Liezel Huber |

== See also ==
- WTA Tour
- WTA 1000 tournaments
- WTA 250 tournaments
- WTA 125 tournaments
- ITF Women's World Tennis Tour
- WTA Premier tournaments
- WTA International tournaments
- ATP Tour 500
