= Koser Jewelers Tennis Challenge =

- 2026 Koser Jewelers Tennis Challenge

Women's World Tennis Tour
- Event name: Koser Jewelers Tennis Challenge
- Location: Landisville, United States
- Venue: Hempfield Recreation Center
- Category: ITF Women's Circuit
- Surface: Hard
- Draw: 32S/32Q/16D
- Prize money: $100,000
- Website: www.landisvilleprocircuit.com

The Koser Jewelers Tennis Challenge is a tournament for professional female tennis players played on outdoor hardcourts. The event is classified as a $100,000 ITF Women's Circuit tournament and has been held in Landisville, Pennsylvania, since 2008.

== Past finals ==
=== Singles ===
Year	Champion	Runner-up	Score
2026	(Belgium) Hanne Vandewinkel	Anastasia Zakharova	3–6, 6–3, 6–1
2025	(Croatia) Petra Marčinko	(Indonesia) Janice Tjen	7–6^{(7–4)}, 3–6, 6–4
2024	(United States) McCartney Kessler	(Australia) Olivia Gadecki	4–6, 6–2, 6–4
2023	(China) Wang Xinyu	(United States) Madison Brengle	6–2, 6–3
2022	(China) Zhu Lin	(United States) Elizabeth Mandlik	6–2, 6–3
2021	(Spain) Nuria Párrizas Díaz	(Belgium) Greet Minnen	7–6^{(8–6)}, 4–6, 7–6^{(9–7)}
2020	tournament cancelled due to the COVID-19 pandemic		
2019	(United States) Madison Brengle (3)	(China) Zhu Lin	6–4, 7–5
2018	(United States) Madison Brengle (2)	(United States) Kristie Ahn	6–4, 1–0 ret.
2017	(Belarus) Vera Lapko	(Slovakia) Anna Karolína Schmiedlová	4–6, 6–4, 7–6^{(7–4)}
2016	(United Kingdom) Laura Robson	(United States) Julia Elbaba	6–0, 6–0
2015	(United Kingdom) Naomi Broady	(United States) Robin Anderson	4–6, 6–4, 7–6^{(7–5)}
2014	(Poland) Paula Kania	(Tunisia) Ons Jabeur	5–7, 6–3, 6–4
2013^{(2)}	(United States) Madison Brengle	(Australia) Olivia Rogowska	6–2, 6–0
2013^{(1)}	(Russia) Alisa Kleybanova	(United States) Natalie Pluskota	6–3, 6–0
2012	(Finland) Piia Suomalainen	(United States) Elizabeth Lumpkin	7–6^{(7–4)}, 6–1
2011	(United States) Robin Anderson	(Australia) Bojana Bobusic	6–2, 6–3
2010	(United States) Alexandra Mueller	(United States) Kyle McPhillips	6–2, 5–7, 6–0
2009	(United States) Laura Granville	(Slovenia) Petra Rampre	6–2, 6–1
2008	(United States) Kristie Ahn	(Canada) Rebecca Marino	6–3, 2–6, 6–3

=== Doubles ===
Year	Champions	Runners-up	Score
2026	(Chinese Taipei) Cho I-hsuan (Chinese Taipei) Cho Yi-tsen	(United States) Savannah Broadus (United States) Kylie Collins	6–2, 6–4
2025	(United States) Carmen Corley (United States) Ivana Corley	(Brazil) Ingrid Martins (Switzerland) Simona Waltert	4–6, 7–6^{(7–4)}, [12–10]
2024	Doubles competition abandoned due to poor weather		
2023	(United States) Sophie Chang (Ukraine) Yulia Starodubtseva	(Australia) Olivia Gadecki (Japan) Mai Hontama	walkover
2022	(United States) Sophie Chang (Kazakhstan) Anna Danilina	(South Korea) Han Na-lae (South Korea) Jang Su-jeong	2–6, 7–6^{(7–4)}, [11–9]
2021	(United States) Hanna Chang (United States) Alexa Glatch	(United Kingdom) Samantha Murray Sharan (Russia) Valeria Savinykh	7–6^{(7–3)}, 3–6, [11–9]
2020	tournament cancelled due to the COVID-19 pandemic		
2019	(United States) Vania King (United States) Claire Liu	(United States) Hayley Carter (United States) Jamie Loeb	4–6, 6–2, [10–5]
2018	(Australia) Ellen Perez (Australia) Arina Rodionova	(Chinese Taipei) Chen Pei-hsuan (Chinese Taipei) Wu Fang-hsien	6–0, 6–2
2017	(United States) Sophie Chang (United States) Alexandra Mueller	(Russia) Ksenia Lykina (United Kingdom) Emily Webley-Smith	4–6, 6–3, [10–5]
2016	(United Kingdom) Freya Christie (United Kingdom) Laura Robson	(Belgium) Elise Mertens (Belgium) An-Sophie Mestach	6–3, 6–4
2015	(Serbia) Ivana Jorović (Australia) Jessica Moore	(United States) Brynn Boren (United States) Nadja Gilchrist	6–1, 6–3
2014	(United States) Jamie Loeb (United States) Sanaz Marand	(United States) Lena Litvak (United States) Alexandra Mueller	7–6^{(7–5)}, 6–1
2013^{(2)}	(Australia) Monique Adamczak (Australia) Olivia Rogowska	(South Africa) Chanel Simmonds (United Kingdom) Emily Webley-Smith	6–2, 6–3
2013^{(1)}	(Bolivia) María Fernanda Álvarez (United States) Keri Wong	(United States) Brooke Austin (Australia) Brooke Rischbieth	2–6, 6–4, [10–5]
2012	(United States) Macall Harkins (United States) Chieh-Yu Hsu	(Canada) Gabriela Dabrowski (United States) Alexandra Mueller	6–3, 6–4
2011	(United States) Chieh-Yu Hsu (United Kingdom) Nicola Slater	(Australia) Brooke Rischbieth (Australia) Storm Sanders	7–5, 6–3
2010	(United States) Gail Brodsky (United States) Alexandra Mueller	(New Zealand) Dianne Hollands (Australia) Tiffany Welford	4–6, 7–5, [10–2]
2009	(Russia) Olga Boulytcheva (Georgia (country)) Magda Okruashvili	(United States) Whitney Jones (United States) Tiya Rolle	6–7^{(5–7)}, 7–5, [10–7]
2008	(United States) Audra Cohen (Canada) Heidi El Tabakh	(Switzerland) Stefania Boffa (United Kingdom) Anna Fitzpatrick	6–3, 7–6^{(7–3)}
