= Mai Hontama =

Japanese tennis player (born 1999)

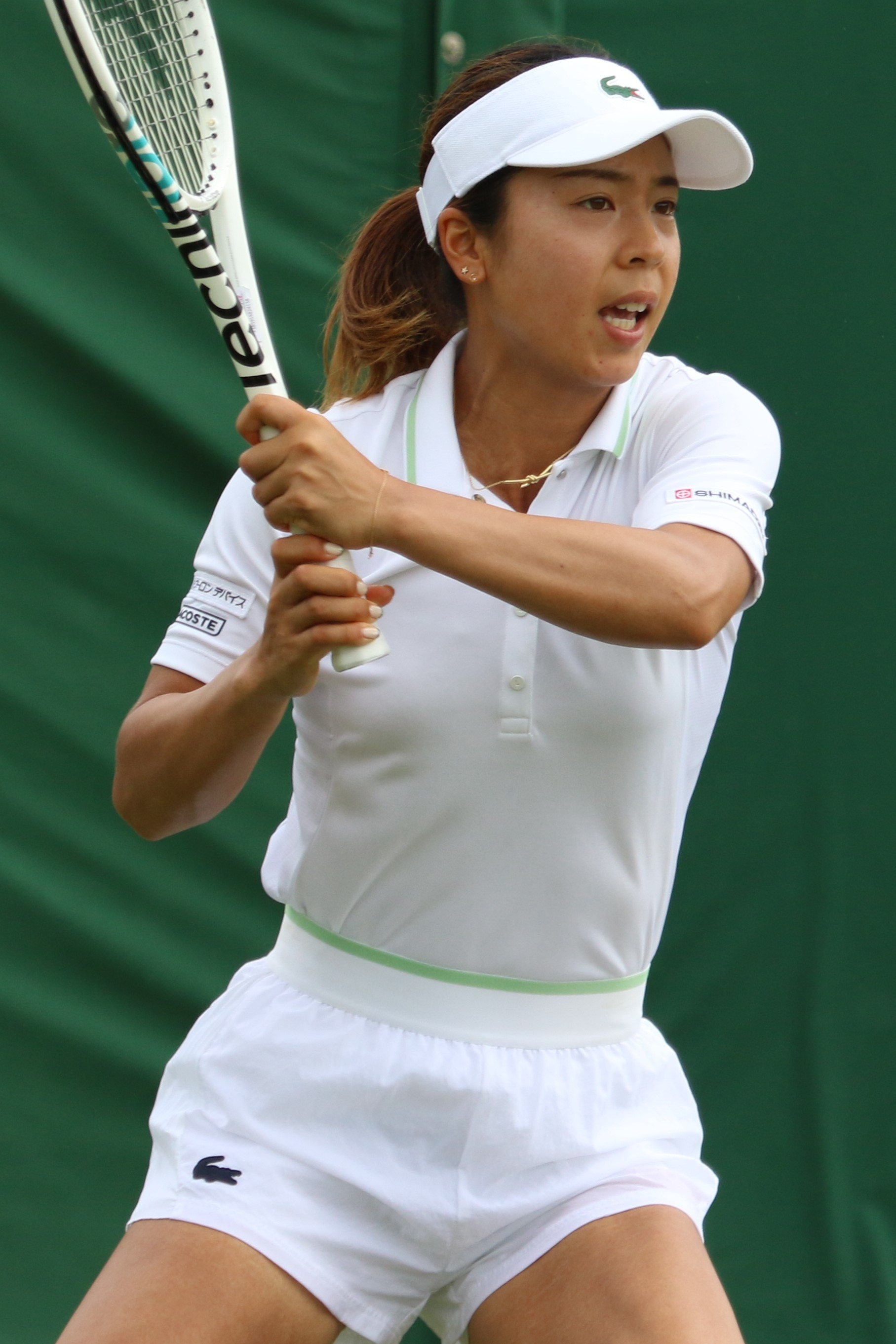
- Hontama at the 2023 Wimbledon Championships
- Country (sports): Japan
- Born: 30 August 1999 (age 27) Machida, Tokyo
- Height: 1.64 m (5 ft 5 in)
- Plays: Right (two-handed backhand)
- Prize money: US$ 1,222,304

Singles
- Career record: 299–224
- Career titles: 4 ITF
- Highest ranking: No. 105 (5 August 2024)
- Current ranking: No. 172 (3 August 2026)

Grand Slam singles results
- Australian Open: 1R (2024)
- French Open: Q3 (2023)
- Wimbledon: 2R (2022)
- US Open: Q2 (2021, 2022, 2023, 2024, 2025, 2026)

Doubles
- Career record: 69–69
- Career titles: 5 ITF
- Highest ranking: No. 109 (6 November 2023)
- Current ranking: No. 644 (13 July 2026)

Team competitions
- BJK Cup: 8–2
- Last updated on: 12 July 2026.

Mai Hontama (本玉真唯) (born 30 August 1999) is a Japanese tennis player. Hontama has a career-high singles ranking of world No. 105 by the WTA, achieved on 5 August 2024, and a career-high doubles ranking of No. 109, set on 6 November 2023.

== Career ==
=== 2021: WTA Tour & 1000 debut, first quarterfinal ===
Hontama made her WTA Tour debut at the WTA 500 2021 Chicago Fall Tennis Classic, after qualifying for the main draw. She reached the quarterfinals, defeating former world No. 4, Caroline Garcia in the first round, her first top 100 win, 11th seed Anett Kontaveit by walkover and Shelby Rogers, before falling to eventual champion Garbiñe Muguruza.

=== 2022-23: Wimbledon debut and first win ===
She made her Grand Slam debut at the Wimbledon Championships after qualifying, where she recorded the first major win in her career, over Clara Tauson.

At her home tournament, the WTA 500 Pan Pacific Open, she reached the second round in 2023, after qualifying and defeating compatriot Nao Hibino before she lost to the top seed Iga Świątek.

=== 2024: Australian Open debut ===
She received a wildcard for the 2024 Australian Open making her main-draw debut at this major but lost to ninth seed Barbora Krejčíková.

She qualified for the main draw at Indian Wells and recorded her first win at this level defeating Zhang Shuai, but lost to 31st seed Marta Kostyuk, in the second round.

Ranked No. 116, she also made her debut at the China Open, as a lucky loser, after the late withdrawal of Amanda Anisimova, losing in the first round to Wang Xinyu.

== Sponsorship ==
Hontama wears Lacoste clothing, and uses Tecnifibre racquets.

== Performance timeline ==
Key
W	F	SF	QF	#R	RR	Q#	DNQ	A	NH

(W) winner; (F) finalist; (SF) semifinalist; (QF) quarterfinalist; (#R) rounds 4, 3, 2, 1; (RR) round-robin stage; (Q#) qualification round; (DNQ) did not qualify; (A) absent; (NH) not held; (SR) strike rate (events won / competed); (W–L) win–loss record.
To avoid confusion and double counting, these charts are updated at the conclusion of a tournament or when the player's participation has ended.

Only main-draw results in WTA Tour, Grand Slam tournaments, Billie Jean King Cup, United Cup, Hopman Cup and Olympic Games are included in win–loss records.

=== Singles ===
Current through the 2026 Athens Open.

Tournament	2021	2022	2023	2024	2025	2026	SR	W–L	Win%
Grand Slam tournaments
Australian Open	A	Q3	Q2	1R	Q2	Q2	0 / 1	0–1	0%
French Open	A	Q1	Q3	Q2	Q1	Q2	0 / 0	0–0	–
Wimbledon	A	2R	Q1	Q1	Q1	Q2	0 / 1	1–1	50%
US Open	Q2	Q2	Q2	Q2	Q2	Q2	0 / 0	0–0	–
Win–loss	0–0	1–1	0–0	0–1	0–0	0–0	0 / 2	1–2	33%
National representation
Billie Jean King Cup (Note: Formerly known as Fed Cup until 2020.)	A (Note: Edition is split into the two years due to COVID-19.)	PO	PO				0 / 0	7–1	88%
WTA 1000
Qatar Open (Note: The first Premier 5 event of the year has switched back and forth between the Dubai Tennis Championships and the Qatar Ladies Open from 2009 until 2024. Dubai was classified as a Premier 5 event from 2009 to 2011 before being succeeded by Doha for the 2012–2014 period. In 2015, Dubai regained its Premier 5 status while Doha was demoted to Premier status. The Premier 5 tournaments were reclassified as WTA 1000 tournaments in 2021.)	A	A	A	Q1			0 / 0	0–0	–
Dubai	A	A	A				0 / 0	0–0	–
Indian Wells	1R	Q2	A	2R			0 / 2	1–2	33%
Miami Open	A	Q1	A	Q1			0 / 0	0–0	–
Canadian Open	A	A	A				0 / 0	0–0	–
Cincinnati Open	A	A	A				0 / 0	0–0	–
Wuhan Open	NH			1R			0 / 1	0–1	0%
China Open	NH		A	1R			0 / 1	0–1	0%
Win–loss	0–1	0–0	0–0	1–3			0 / 4	1–4	20%
Career statistics
	2021	2022	2023	2024	2025	2026	SR	W–L	Win%
Tournaments	2	4	4	11	3	1	total: 25		
Titles	0	0	0	0	0	0	total: 0		
Finals	0	0	0	0	0	0	total: 0		
Overall win–loss	2–2	3–5	11–5	4–11	0–3	1–1	0 / 25	21–27	44%
Year-end ranking (Note: 2016: WTA ranking–734, 2017: WTA ranking–916, 2018: WTA ranking–402, 2019: WTA ranking–381, 2020: WTA ranking–330.)	150	212	124	148	260		$555,639		

=== Doubles ===
Current through the 2023 WTA Tour season.

Tournament	2022	2023	SR	W–L
Grand Slam tournaments
Australian Open	A	A	0 / 0	0–0
French Open	A	A	0 / 0	0–0
Wimbledon	A	A	0 / 0	0–0
US Open	A	A	0 / 0	0–0
Win–loss	0–0	0–0	0 / 0	0–0
National representation
Billie Jean King Cup	PO	PO	0 / 0	0–0
Career statistics
Tournaments	1	2	Career total: 3	
Titles	0	0	Career total: 0	
Finals	0	0	Career total: 0	
Overall win–loss	0–1	1–2	0 / 3	1–3
Year-end ranking (Note: 2017: WTA ranking–1094, 2018: WTA ranking–833, 2019: WTA ranking–503, 2020: WTA ranking–553, 2021: WTA ranking–576.)	512	109		

== WTA Tour finals ==
=== Doubles: 1 (runner-up) ===
Legend WTA 250 (0–1)	Finals by surface Hard (0–1)

Result	W–L	Date	Tournament	Tier	Surface	Partner	Opponents	Score
Loss	0–1	Oct 2023	Jasmin Open, Tunisia	WTA 250	Hard	(Serbia) Natalija Stevanović	(Italy) Sara Errani (Italy) Jasmine Paolini	6–2, 6–7^{(4–7)}, [6–10]

== ITF Circuit finals ==
=== Singles: 10 (4 titles, 6 runner-ups) ===
Legend $60/75 tournaments (1–1) $40,000 tournaments (1–1) $25,000 tournaments (2–2) $15,000 tournaments (0–2)	Finals by surface Hard (4–2) Clay (0–3) Carpet (0–1)

Result	W–L	Date	Tournament	Tier	Surface	Opponent	Score
Loss	0–1	Sep 2018	ITF Nanao, Japan	25,000	Carpet	(Japan) Ayano Shimizu	3–6, 1–6
Loss	0–2	Mar 2020	ITF Yokohama, Japan	25,000	Hard	(Japan) Yuriko Miyazaki	5–7, 7–5, 2–6
Loss	0–3	Mar 2021	ITF Antalya, Turkey	15,000	Clay	(South Korea) Jang Su-jeong	6–4, 3–6, 2–6
Loss	0–4	Mar 2021	ITF Antalya, Turkey	15,000	Clay	(Romania) Cristina Dinu	2–6, 3–6
Win	1–4	May 2021	ITF Salinas, Ecuador	25,000	Hard	(Canada) Carol Zhao	7–5, 6–1
Win	2–4	Jun 2021	ITF Porto, Portugal	25,000	Hard	(Russia) Anastasia Tikhonova	6–4, 6–3
Win	3–4	Nov 2022	Sydney Challenger, Australia	60,000	Hard	(Australia) Petra Hule	7–6^{(1)}, 3–6, 7–5
Win	4–4	Mar 2023	Branik Maribor Open, Slovenia	40,000	Hard (i)	(Denmark) Clara Tauson	6–4, 3–6, 6–4
Loss	4–5	May 2025	Empire Slovak Open, Slovakia	W75	Clay	(Germany) Tamara Korpatsch	6–1, 4–6, 4–6
Loss	4–6	Nov 2025	ITF Austin, US	W50	Hard	(United States) Mary Stoiana	6–2, 3–6, 4–6

=== Doubles: 9 (5 titles, 4 runner-ups) ===
Legend $100,000 tournaments (1–1) $60,000 tournaments (3–1) $25,000 tournaments (1–1) $10,000 tournaments (0–1)	Finals by surface Hard (3–4) Clay (2–0)

Result	W–L	Date	Tournament	Tier	Surface	Partner	Opponents	Score
Loss	0–1	Dec 2016	ITF Hua Hin, Thailand	10,000	Hard	(Japan) Yukina Saigo	(Thailand) Nudnida Luangnam (Thailand) Varunya Wongteanchai	5–7, 3–6
Win	1–1	Sep 2022	ITF Santarém, Portugal	25,000	Hard	(Australia) Maddison Inglis	(Netherlands) Suzan Lamens; Anastasia Tikhonova	6–0, 6–4
Loss	1–2	Nov 2022	Yokohama Challenger, Japan	25,000	Hard	(South Korea) Han Na-lae	(Japan) Saki Imamura (Japan) Naho Sato	4–6, 6–4, [5–10]
Loss	1–3	Nov 2022	ITF Tokyo Open, Japan	60,000	Hard (i)	(Japan) Junri Namigata	(Chinese Taipei) Hsieh Yu-chieh (Indonesia) Jessy Rompies	4–6, 3–6
Win	2–3	Feb 2023	Burnie International, Australia	60,000	Hard	(Japan) Eri Hozumi	(Japan) Ena Shibahara (Australia) Arina Rodionova	4–6, 6–3, [10–6]
Win	3–3	Mar 2023	ITF Pretoria, South Africa	60,000	Hard	(France) Alice Tubello	(Belgium) Sofia Costoulas (Italy) Dalila Spiteri	6–3, 6–3
Win	4–3	May 2023	Open Villa de Madrid, Spain	100,000	Hard	(Japan) Eri Hozumi	(Greece) Eleni Christofi (Greece) Despina Papamichail	6–0, 7–5
Win	5–3	Jun 2023	Internazionali di Brescia, Italy	60,000	Clay	(Japan) Moyuka Uchijima	Alena Fomina-Klotz (Australia) Olivia Tjandramulia	6–1, 6–0
Loss	5–4	Aug 2023	Landisville Tennis Challenge, United States	100,000	Hard	(Australia) Olivia Gadecki	(United States) Sophie Chang (Ukraine) Yulia Starodubtseva	w/o

== Head-to-head records ==
=== Record against top 10 players ===
- She has a 0–2 (0%) record against players who were, at the time the match was played, ranked in the top 10.

Result	W–L	Opponent	Rank	Event	Surface	Round	Score	Rank	H2H
2021
Loss	0–1	(Spain) Garbiñe Muguruza	No. 9	Chicago Classic, United States	Hard	QF	3–6, 2–6	No. 200	
2023
Loss	0–2	(Poland) Iga Świątek	No. 2	Pan Pacific Open, Japan	Hard	2R	4–6, 5–7	No. 148	
