= Landisville, Pennsylvania =

Unincorporated community in Pennsylvania, US

- Census-designated place
- Location within Pennsylvania Location within the United States
- Country: United States
- State: Pennsylvania
- County: Lancaster
- Township: East Hempfield

Area
  - Total: 1.28 sq mi (3.32 km^{2})
  - Land: 1.28 sq mi (3.31 km^{2})
  - Water: 0.0039 sq mi (0.01 km^{2})
- Elevation: 410 ft (120 m)

Population (2020)
  - Total: 2,196
  - Density: 1,720.8/sq mi (664.41/km^{2})
- Time zone: UTC-5 (Eastern (EST))
  - Summer (DST): UTC-4 (EDT)
- ZIP code: 17538
- Area codes: 717 and 223
- FIPS code: 42-41304
- GNIS feature ID: 1178856

Landisville is an unincorporated community and census-designated place (CDP) in East Hempfield Township, Lancaster County, Pennsylvania, United States. As of the 2010 census the population was 1,893. The community was once part of the Salunga-Landisville CDP, before splitting into two separate CDPs for the 2010 census, the other being Salunga.

== Geography ==
Landisville is located along Old Harrisburg Pike, 7 miles (11 km) northwest of Lancaster, the county seat. Pennsylvania Route 283, a four-lane expressway, forms the northern edge of the community, with access from Pennsylvania Route 722, 2 miles (3 km) southeast of town, and from Spooky Nook Road, 1.5 miles (2.4 km) northwest of town, on the northern edge of Salunga. PA 283 leads southeast to Lancaster and northwest 32 miles (51 km) to Harrisburg, the state capital.

According to the U.S. Census Bureau, the Landisville CDP has a total area of 1.3 square miles (3.3 km^{2}), of which 0.004 square miles (0.01 km^{2}), or 0.31%, are water. The community drains east to Swarr Run, a southeast-flowing tributary of Little Conestoga Creek and part of the Conestoga River watershed flowing to the Susquehanna River.

=== Climate ===
Climate data for Landisville, Pennsylvania (1991–2020 normals, extremes 1952–present)
Month	Jan	Feb	Mar	Apr	May	Jun	Jul	Aug	Sep	Oct	Nov	Dec	Year
Record high °F (°C)	71 (22)	81 (27)	86 (30)	92 (33)	94 (34)	99 (37)	102 (39)	102 (39)	101 (38)	91 (33)	82 (28)	76 (24)	102 (39)
Mean daily maximum °F (°C)	37.4 (3.0)	40.6 (4.8)	50.0 (10.0)	63.0 (17.2)	72.6 (22.6)	80.6 (27.0)	84.5 (29.2)	82.7 (28.2)	76.4 (24.7)	64.8 (18.2)	52.7 (11.5)	41.7 (5.4)	62.3 (16.8)
Daily mean °F (°C)	28.4 (−2.0)	30.5 (−0.8)	38.9 (3.8)	50.2 (10.1)	60.4 (15.8)	69.1 (20.6)	72.9 (22.7)	71.0 (21.7)	64.4 (18.0)	52.9 (11.6)	42.2 (5.7)	32.9 (0.5)	51.1 (10.6)
Mean daily minimum °F (°C)	19.4 (−7.0)	20.4 (−6.4)	27.9 (−2.3)	37.3 (2.9)	48.2 (9.0)	57.6 (14.2)	61.3 (16.3)	59.2 (15.1)	52.4 (11.3)	40.9 (4.9)	31.6 (−0.2)	24.2 (−4.3)	40.0 (4.4)
Record low °F (°C)	−24 (−31)	−20 (−29)	−13 (−25)	17 (−8)	22 (−6)	34 (1)	41 (5)	35 (2)	27 (−3)	18 (−8)	11 (−12)	−12 (−24)	−24 (−31)
Average precipitation inches (mm)	3.06 (78)	2.44 (62)	3.61 (92)	3.56 (90)	3.87 (98)	4.33 (110)	4.84 (123)	4.04 (103)	4.68 (119)	4.17 (106)	3.24 (82)	3.33 (85)	45.17 (1,147)
Average snowfall inches (cm)	7.1 (18)	6.7 (17)	4.5 (11)	0.3 (0.76)	0.0 (0.0)	0.0 (0.0)	0.0 (0.0)	0.0 (0.0)	0.0 (0.0)	0.0 (0.0)	0.7 (1.8)	3.9 (9.9)	23.2 (59)
Average precipitation days (≥ 0.01 in)	10.0	8.8	10.1	11.2	12.9	11.2	11.4	10.5	9.5	9.5	8.3	10.1	123.5
Average snowy days (≥ 0.1 in)	4.5	3.8	2.2	0.3	0.0	0.0	0.0	0.0	0.0	0.0	0.5	2.2	13.5
Source: NOAA

== Demographics ==
Historical population
Census	Pop.	Note	%±
2020	2,196		—
U.S. Decennial Census
