= 2021 Koser Jewelers Tennis Challenge – Doubles =

Doubles
- 2021 Koser Jewelers Tennis Challenge

Final
- Champions: (United States) Hanna Chang (United States) Alexa Glatch
- Runners-up: (United Kingdom) Samantha Murray Sharan (Russia) Valeria Savinykh
- Score: 7–6^{(7–3)}, 3–6, [11–9]

Events
Singles	Doubles
← 2019 ·	Koser Jewelers Tennis Challenge	· 2022 →

Vania King and Claire Liu were the defending champions, having won the previous edition in 2019 however King retired from professional tennis in April, whilst Liu chose not to participate.

Hanna Chang and Alexa Glatch won the title, defeating Samantha Murray Sharan and Valeria Savinykh in the final, 7–6^{(7–3)}, 3–6, [11–9].

== Seeds ==
1. (Belgium) Greet Minnen / (Netherlands) Lesley Pattinama Kerkhove (first round)
2. (United States) Quinn Gleason / (United States) Jamie Loeb (quarterfinals)
3. (United Kingdom) Samantha Murray Sharan / (Russia) Valeria Savinykh (final)
4. (India) Ankita Raina / (Mexico) Renata Zarazúa (quarterfinals, withdrew)

== Draw ==
=== Key ===
- Q = Qualifier
- WC = Wild card
- LL = Lucky loser
- Alt = Alternate
- SE = Special exempt
- PR = Protected ranking
- ITF = ITF entry
- JE = Junior exempt
- w/o = Walkover
- r = Retired
- d = Defaulted
- SR = Special ranking

=== Draw ===
First round
1	(Belgium) G Minnen (Netherlands) L Pattinama Kerkhove	2	6	[6]
(Thailand) P Plipuech (Indonesia) J Rompies	6	4	[10]
Alt	(Spain) C Bucșa (Brazil) B Haddad Maia	6	6
(Germany) M Barthel (Switzerland) L Küng	1	2
3	(United Kingdom) S Murray Sharan (Russia) V Savinykh	6	6
(Poland) M Fręch (Poland) K Kawa	4	3
(Russia) A Kalinskaya (Denmark) C Tauson	6	6
(Australia) L Cabrera (United States) F Di Lorenzo	2	1
(Chinese Taipei) Y-c Hsieh (Chinese Taipei) C-y Hsu	7	6
(Belgium) Y Bonaventure (Spain) N Párrizas Díaz	5	4
WC	(United States) S Chang (United States) S Whittle	3	5
4	(India) A Raina (Mexico) R Zarazúa	6	7
(United States) M Brengle (United States) G Min	6	3	[7]
WC	(United States) H Chang (United States) A Glatch	1	6	[10]
WC	(United States) E Mandlik (United States) A Parks	3	3
2	(United States) Q Gleason (United States) J Loeb	6	6

Quarterfinals
(Thailand) P Plipuech (Indonesia) J Rompies	6	3	[11]
Alt	(Spain) C Bucșa (Brazil) B Haddad Maia	4	6	[9]
3	(United Kingdom) S Murray Sharan (Russia) V Savinykh	w/o
(Russia) A Kalinskaya (Denmark) C Tauson
(Chinese Taipei) Y-c Hsieh (Chinese Taipei) C-y Hsu	w/o
4	(India) A Raina (Mexico) R Zarazúa
WC	(United States) H Chang (United States) A Glatch	6	2	[10]
2	(United States) Q Gleason (United States) J Loeb	2	6	[8]

Semifinals
(Thailand) P Plipuech (Indonesia) J Rompies	5	6	[5]
3	(United Kingdom) S Murray Sharan (Russia) V Savinykh	7	1	[10]
(Chinese Taipei) Y-c Hsieh (Chinese Taipei) C-y Hsu	2	6	[6]
WC	(United States) H Chang (United States) A Glatch	6	1	[10]

Final
3	(United Kingdom) S Murray Sharan (Russia) V Savinykh	6^{3}	6	[9]
WC	(United States) H Chang (United States) A Glatch	7^{7}	3	[11]
