= 2021 Koser Jewelers Tennis Challenge – Singles =

Singles
- 2021 Koser Jewelers Tennis Challenge

Final
- Champion: (Spain) Nuria Párrizas Díaz
- Runner-up: (Belgium) Greet Minnen
- Score: 7–6^{(8–6)}, 4–6, 7–6^{(9–7)}

Events
Singles	Doubles
← 2019 ·	Koser Jewelers Tennis Challenge	· 2022 →

Madison Brengle was the defending champion, having won the previous edition in 2019, but lost in the second round to Lesley Pattinama Kerkhove.

Nuria Párrizas Díaz won the title, defeating Greet Minnen in the final, 7–6^{(8–6)}, 4–6, 7–6^{(9–7)}.

== Seeds ==
1. (United States) Madison Brengle (second round)
2. (Denmark) Clara Tauson (second round, retired)
3. (Spain) Nuria Párrizas Díaz (champion)
4. (Belgium) Greet Minnen (final)
5. (United States) Varvara Lepchenko (withdrew)
6. (Belgium) Ysaline Bonaventure (first round)
7. (Russia) Anna Kalinskaya (first round)
8. (United States) Caty McNally (quarterfinals)

== Draw ==
=== Key ===
- Q = Qualifier
- WC = Wild card
- LL = Lucky loser
- Alt = Alternate
- SE = Special exempt
- PR = Protected ranking
- ITF = ITF entry
- JE = Junior exempt
- w/o = Walkover
- r = Retired
- d = Defaulted
- SR = Special ranking

=== Finals ===
Semifinals
(Netherlands) Lesley Pattinama Kerkhove	3	1
4	(Belgium) Greet Minnen	6	6
3	(Spain) Nuria Párrizas Díaz	2	6	6
(Poland) Katarzyna Kawa	6	0	3

Final
4	(Belgium) Greet Minnen	6^{6}	6	6^{7}
3	(Spain) Nuria Párrizas Díaz	7^{8}	4	7^{9}

=== Top half ===
First round
1	(United States) M Brengle	6	7
WC	(United States) A Glatch	1	5
(Australia) L Cabrera	2	3
(Netherlands) L Pattinama Kerkhove	6	6
Q	(Ukraine) D Snigur	0^{r}
Q	(Brazil) B Haddad Maia	5
LL	(United States) S Chang	7^{7}	7
7	(Russia) A Kalinskaya	6^{5}	5
4	(Belgium) G Minnen	6^{6}	6	6
(United States) F Di Lorenzo	7^{8}	2	2
Q	(Japan) M Hontama	6	4
WC	(United States) D Lao	2	1^{r}
(United States) C Dolehide	4	4
Q	(Japan) M Hibi	6	6
Q	(Indonesia) A Sutjiadi	5	4
8	(United States) C McNally	7	6

Second round
1	(United States) M Brengle	3	6^{4}
(Netherlands) L Pattinama Kerkhove	6	7^{7}
Q	(Brazil) B Haddad Maia	6	6
LL	(United States) S Chang	4	4
4	(Belgium) G Minnen	6	6
Q	(Japan) M Hontama	3	2
Q	(Japan) M Hibi	4	6^{2}
8	(United States) C McNally	6	7^{7}

Quarterfinals
(Netherlands) L Pattinama Kerkhove	6^{2}	6	6
Q	(Brazil) B Haddad Maia	7^{7}	4	1
4	(Belgium) G Minnen	7	6
8	(United States) C McNally	5	3

Semifinals
(Netherlands) L Pattinama Kerkhove	3	1
4	(Belgium) G Minnen	6	6

=== Bottom half ===
First round
6	(Belgium) Y Bonaventure	6^{4}	2
Q	(United Kingdom) E Raducanu	7^{7}	6
Q	(Georgia (country)) E Gorgodze	6^{3}	6	1
(United States) C Vandeweghe	7^{7}	3	0^{r}
WC	(United States) G Min	6	5	7^{7}
PR	(Russia) V Diatchenko	3	7	6^{4}
WC	(United States) J Loeb	6^{2}	2
3	(Spain) N Párrizas Díaz	7^{7}	6
Q	(India) A Raina	6	6
(Mexico) R Zarazúa	3	2
(Poland) K Kawa	3	6	7
(Switzerland) L Küng	6	1	5
(Poland) M Fręch	6	6
(Spain) C Bucșa	2	3
(Australia) Ar Rodionova	1	2
2	(Denmark) C Tauson	6	6

Second round
Q	(United Kingdom) E Raducanu	3	6	6
(Georgia (country)) E Gorgodze	6	0	1
WC	(United States) G Min	2	6	1
3	(Spain) N Párrizas Díaz	6	3	6
Q	(India) A Raina	3	7^{7}	4
(Poland) K Kawa	6	6^{4}	6
(Poland) M Fręch	7^{10}	0
2	(Denmark) C Tauson	6^{8}	0^{r}

Quarterfinals
Q	(United Kingdom) E Raducanu	3^{r}
3	(Spain) N Párrizas Díaz	4
(Poland) K Kawa	6	2	6
(Poland) M Fręch	4	6	2

Semifinals
3	(Spain) N Párrizas Díaz	2	6	6
(Poland) K Kawa	6	0	3
