= 2023 L'Open 35 de Saint-Malo =

- Date: 1–7 May 2023
- Edition: 28th
- Category: WTA 125
- Draw: 32S/15D
- Prize money: $115,000
- Surface: Clay
- Location: Saint-Malo, France

Champions

Singles
- (United States) Sloane Stephens

Doubles
- (Belgium) Greet Minnen / (Netherlands) Bibiane Schoofs
← 2022 ·	L'Open 35 de Saint-Malo	· 2024 →

The 2023 L'Open 35 de Saint-Malo was a professional tennis tournament played on outdoor clay courts. It was the twenty-eighth edition of the tournament and a part of the 2023 WTA 125 tournaments. It took place at the Tennis Club JA Saint-Malo in Saint-Malo, France between 1 and 7 May 2023.

== Singles main-draw entrants ==
=== Seeds ===
Country	Player	Rank^{1}	Seed
USA	Sloane Stephens	48	1
USA	Claire Liu	55	2
BEL	Maryna Zanevska	75	3
BEL	Ysaline Bonaventure	84	4
ITA	Lucia Bronzetti	97	5
CZE	Tereza Martincová	98	6
POL	Magdalena Fręch	100	7
USA	Emma Navarro	101	8

- ^{1} Rankings are as of 24 April 2023.

=== Other entrants ===
The following players received wildcards into the singles main draw:

- (France) Séléna Janicijevic
- (France) Margaux Rouvroy
- (United States) Sloane Stephens
- (Ukraine) Elina Svitolina

The following player received entry into the main draw through protected ranking:

- (France) Amandine Hesse

The following players received entry from the qualifying draw:

- (France) Émeline Dartron
- (France) Carole Monnet
- (France) Alice Robbe
- Iryna Shymanovich

The following player received entry as a lucky loser:

- (United Kingdom) Freya Christie

=== Withdrawals ===
- (Hungary) Anna Bondár → replaced by (France) Jessika Ponchet
- (France) Clara Burel → replaced by (United Kingdom) Freya Christie
- (France) Océane Dodin → replaced by (United Kingdom) Katie Swan
- (Germany) Tamara Korpatsch → replaced by (Greece) Despina Papamichail
- (Montenegro) Danka Kovinić → replaced by (France) Elsa Jacquemot
- (Germany) Eva Lys → replaced by (Croatia) Ana Konjuh
- (Germany) Tatjana Maria → replaced by (France) Amandine Hesse
- (United States) Alycia Parks → replaced by (Uzbekistan) Nigina Abduraimova
- (Slovenia) Tamara Zidanšek → replaced by (Spain) Rosa Vicens Mas

== Doubles main-draw entrants ==
=== Seeds ===
Country	Player	Country	Player	Rank^{1}	Seed
NOR	Ulrikke Eikeri	JPN	Eri Hozumi	106	1
BRA	Ingrid Gamarra Martins		Iryna Shymanovich	180	2
BEL	Greet Minnen	NED	Bibiane Schoofs	204	3
GBR	Freya Christie	GBR	Ali Collins	237	4

- ^{1} Rankings as of April 24, 2023.

== Champions ==
=== Singles ===
- (United States) Sloane Stephens def. (Belgium) Greet Minnen 6–3, 6–4

=== Doubles ===
- (Belgium) Greet Minnen / (Netherlands) Bibiane Schoofs def. (Norway) Ulrikke Eikeri / (Japan) Eri Hozumi 7–6^{(9–7)}, 7–6^{(7–3)}
