= 2022 L'Open 35 de Saint-Malo =

- Date: 2–8 May 2022
- Edition: 27th
- Category: WTA 125
- Draw: 32S/15D
- Prize money: $115,000
- Surface: Clay
- Location: Saint-Malo, France

Champions

Singles
- (Brazil) Beatriz Haddad Maia

Doubles
- (Japan) Eri Hozumi / (Japan) Makoto Ninomiya
← 2021 ·	L'Open 35 de Saint-Malo	· 2023 →

The 2022 L'Open 35 de Saint-Malo was a professional tennis tournament played on outdoor clay courts. It was the twenty-seventh edition of the tournament and a part of the 2022 WTA 125 tournaments. It took place in Saint-Malo, France between 2 and 8 May 2022.

== Singles main-draw entrants ==
=== Seeds ===
Country	Player	Rank^{1}	Seed
USA	Madison Brengle	54	1
POL	Magda Linette	56	2
EGY	Mayar Sherif	61	3
BRA	Beatriz Haddad Maia	64	4
BEL	Maryna Zanevska	70	5
	Anna Kalinskaya	75	6
USA	Claire Liu	86	7
POL	Magdalena Fręch	88	8

- ^{1} Rankings are as of 25 April 2022.

=== Other entrants ===
The following players received wildcards into the singles main draw:

- (France) Tessah Andrianjafitrimo
- (France) Elsa Jacquemot
- (France) Léolia Jeanjean
- (Puerto Rico) Monica Puig

The following players received entry from the qualifying draw:

- (France) Estelle Cascino
- (Australia) Jaimee Fourlis
- (Japan) Eri Hozumi
- (Brazil) Laura Pigossi

=== Withdrawals ===
Before the tournament

- (Hungary) Anna Bondár → replaced by (Germany) Tamara Korpatsch
- (Italy) Lucia Bronzetti → replaced by (France) Océane Dodin
- (France) Caroline Garcia → replaced by (Japan) Mai Hontama
- Varvara Gracheva → replaced by (France) Fiona Ferro
- (Slovenia) Kaja Juvan → replaced by (United Kingdom) Heather Watson
- (Estonia) Kaia Kanepi → replaced by (Canada) Rebecca Marino
- (Ukraine) Marta Kostyuk → replaced by Kamilla Rakhimova
- (Belgium) Greet Minnen → replaced by (Australia) Maddison Inglis
- (Belgium) Alison Van Uytvanck → replaced by (United States) Bernarda Pera
- (China) Zheng Qinwen → replaced by (France) Diane Parry

== Doubles main-draw entrants ==
=== Seeds ===
Country	Player	Country	Player	Rank^{1}	Seed
POL	Magda Linette	USA	Bernarda Pera	67	1
JPN	Eri Hozumi	JPN	Makoto Ninomiya	93	2
~~USA~~	~~Kaitlyn Christian~~		~~Lidziya Marozava~~	~~134~~	3
JPN	Miyu Kato	USA	Sabrina Santamaria	143	4
BRA	Beatriz Haddad Maia	EGY	Mayar Sherif	157	5

- ^{1} Rankings as of April 25, 2022.

== Champions ==
=== Singles ===
- (Brazil) Beatriz Haddad Maia def. Anna Blinkova 7–6^{(7–3)}, 6–3

=== Doubles ===
- (Japan) Eri Hozumi / (Japan) Makoto Ninomiya def. (France) Estelle Cascino / (France) Jessika Ponchet 7–6^{(7–1)}, 6–1
