= 2021 Koser Jewelers Tennis Challenge =

Tennis tournament

- Date: 9–15 August 2021
- Edition: 14th
- Category: ITF Women's World Tennis Tour
- Draw: 32S / 16D
- Prize money: $100,000
- Surface: Hard
- Location: Landisville, Pennsylvania, United States

Champions

Singles
- (Spain) Nuria Párrizas Díaz

Doubles
- (United States) Hanna Chang / (United States) Alexa Glatch
← 2019 ·	Koser Jewelers Tennis Challenge	· 2022 →

The 2021 Koser Jewelers Tennis Challenge was a professional women's tennis tournament played on outdoor hard courts. It was the fourteenth edition of the tournament which was part of the 2021 ITF Women's World Tennis Tour. It took place in Landisville, Pennsylvania, United States between 9 and 15 August 2021.

== Points and prize money ==
=== Point distribution ===
Event	W	F	SF	QF	Round of 16	Round of 32	Q	Q2	Q1
Women's singles	140	85	50	25	13	1	6	4	0
Women's doubles	140	85	50	25	1	—	—	—	—

=== Prize money ===
Event	W	F	SF	QF	Round of 16	Round of 32	Q2	Q1
Women's singles	$15,239	$8,147	$4,473	$2,573	$1,559	$926	$509	$316
Women's doubles	$5,573	$2,787	$1,393	$760	$507	—	—	—

== Singles main-draw entrants ==
=== Seeds ===
Country	Player	Rank^{1}	Seed
USA	Madison Brengle	78	1
DEN	Clara Tauson	97	2
ESP	Nuria Párrizas Díaz	109	3
BEL	Greet Minnen	111	4
~~USA~~	~~Varvara Lepchenko~~	~~126~~	~~5~~
BEL	Ysaline Bonaventure	127	6
RUS	Anna Kalinskaya	133	7
USA	Caty McNally	134	8

- ^{1} Rankings are as of 2 August 2021.

=== Other entrants ===
The following players received wildcards into the singles main draw:

- (United States) Alexa Glatch
- (United States) Danielle Lao
- (United States) Jamie Loeb
- (United States) Grace Min

The following player received entry using a protected ranking:

- (Russia) Vitalia Diatchenko

The following players received entry from the qualifying draw:

- (Georgia (country)) Ekaterine Gorgodze
- (Brazil) Beatriz Haddad Maia
- (Japan) Mayo Hibi
- (Japan) Mai Hontama
- (United Kingdom) Emma Raducanu
- (India) Ankita Raina
- (Ukraine) Daria Snigur
- (Indonesia) Aldila Sutjiadi

The following player received entry as a Lucky loser:

- (United States) Sophie Chang

== Champions ==
=== Singles ===
- (Spain) Nuria Párrizas Díaz def. (Belgium) Greet Minnen, 7–6^{(8–6)}, 4–6, 7–6^{(9–7)}

=== Doubles ===
- (United States) Hanna Chang / (United States) Alexa Glatch def. (United Kingdom) Samantha Murray Sharan / (Russia) Valeria Savinykh, 7–6^{(7–3)}, 3–6, [11–9]
