= 2022 L'Open 35 de Saint-Malo – Singles =

Singles
- 2022 L'Open 35 de Saint-Malo

Final
- Champion: (Brazil) Beatriz Haddad Maia
- Runner-up: Anna Blinkova
- Score: 7–6^{(7–3)}, 6–3

Details
- Draw: 32

Events
| Singles | Doubles |
| ← 2021 · | L'Open 35 de Saint-Malo | · 2023 → |

Viktorija Golubic was the defending champion, but chose not to participate.

Beatriz Haddad Maia won the title, defeating Anna Blinkova in the final, 7–6^{(7–3)}, 6–3.

== Seeds ==
1. (United States) Madison Brengle (quarterfinals)
2. (Poland) Magda Linette (quarterfinals)
3. (Egypt) Mayar Sherif (second round)
4. (Brazil) Beatriz Haddad Maia (champion)
5. (Belgium) Maryna Zanevska (semifinals, retired)
6. Anna Kalinskaya (first round)
7. (United States) Claire Liu (quarterfinals)
8. (Poland) Magdalena Fręch (semifinals)

== Draw ==
=== Key ===
- Q = Qualifier
- WC = Wild card
- LL = Lucky loser
- Alt = Alternate
- SE = Special exempt
- PR = Protected ranking
- ITF = ITF entry
- JE = Junior exempt
- w/o = Walkover
- r = Retired
- d = Defaulted
- SR = Special ranking

=== Finals ===
Semifinals
5 | (Belgium) Maryna Zanevska | 0^{r}
4 | (Brazil) Beatriz Haddad Maia | 5
Anna Blinkova | 6 | 3 | 7^{7}
8 | (Poland) Magdalena Fręch | 3 | 6 | 6^{2}

Final
4 | (Brazil) Beatriz Haddad Maia | 7^{7} | 6
Anna Blinkova | 6^{3} | 3

=== Top half ===
First round
1 | (United States) M Brengle | 7 | 6
(United States) L Davis | 5 | 1
(United Kingdom) H Watson | 7^{7} | 6
WC | (France) T Andrianjafitrimo | 6^{3} | 1
(France) F Ferro | 2
WC | (Puerto Rico) M Puig | 1^{r}
Q | (Australia) J Fourlis | 6 | 5 | 6^{4}
5 | (Belgium) M Zanevska | 2 | 7 | 7^{7}
4 | (Brazil) B Haddad Maia | 6 | 6
(Australia) M Inglis | 2 | 0
Q | (Brazil) L Pigossi | 6 | 6
K Rakhimova | 3 | 1
WC | (France) E Jacquemot | 6 | 6
Q | (France) E Cascino | 0 | 2
(Australia) A Sharma | 1 | 2
7 | (United States) C Liu | 6 | 6

Second round
1 | (United States) M Brengle | 6 | 6
(United Kingdom) H Watson | 0 | 2
(France) F Ferro | 4 | 5
5 | (Belgium) M Zanevska | 6 | 7
4 | (Brazil) B Haddad Maia | 6 | 7^{7}
Q | (Brazil) L Pigossi | 4 | 6^{5}
WC | (France) E Jacquemot | 3 | 2
7 | (United States) C Liu | 6 | 6

Quarterfinals
1 | (United States) M Brengle | 4 | 4
5 | (Belgium) M Zanevska | 6 | 6
4 | (Brazil) B Haddad Maia | 7 | 3 | 6
7 | (United States) C Liu | 5 | 6 | 2

Semifinals
5 | (Belgium) M Zanevska | 0^{r}
4 | (Brazil) B Haddad Maia | 5

=== Bottom half ===
First round
6 | A Kalinskaya | 6 | 3 | 4
(Canada) R Marino | 3 | 6 | 6
(France) H Tan | 1 | 6 | 0
A Blinkova | 6 | 4 | 6
(France) O Dodin | 4 | 4
(United States) B Pera | 6 | 6
(Japan) M Hontama | 3 | 6 | 3
3 | (Egypt) M Sherif | 6 | 3 | 6
8 | (Poland) M Fręch | 6 | 6
WC | (France) L Jeanjean | 1 | 3
(France) D Parry | 6 | 6
Q | (Japan) E Hozumi | 1 | 2
(Slovakia) AK Schmiedlová | 6 | 2 | 4
(Germany) T Korpatsch | 3 | 6 | 6
(France) J Ponchet | 6^{2} | 3
2 | (Poland) M Linette | 7^{7} | 6

Second round
(Canada) R Marino | 5 | 7^{7} | 3
A Blinkova | 7 | 6^{2} | 6
(United States) B Pera | 6 | 6
3 | (Egypt) M Sherif | 4 | 2
8 | (Poland) M Fręch | 6 | 7
(France) D Parry | 3 | 5
(Germany) T Korpatsch | 5 | 2
2 | (Poland) M Linette | 7 | 6

Quarterfinals
A Blinkova | 6 | 3 | 7
(United States) B Pera | 2 | 6 | 5
8 | (Poland) M Fręch | 7 | 6^{2} | 6
2 | (Poland) M Linette | 5 | 7^{7} | 2

Semifinals
A Blinkova | 6 | 3 | 7^{7}
8 | (Poland) M Fręch | 3 | 6 | 6^{2}

== Qualifying ==
=== Seeds ===
1. (Brazil) Laura Pigossi (qualified)
2. (France) Jessika Ponchet (moved to main draw)
3. Anastasia Zakharova (first round)
4. (Australia) Jaimee Fourlis (qualified)
5. (France) Carole Monnet (qualifying competition)
6. (Belgium) Magali Kempen (qualifying competition)
7. (Thailand) Peangtarn Plipuech (first round)
8. (France) Marine Partaud (qualifying competition)

=== Qualifiers ===
1. (Brazil) Laura Pigossi
2. (Japan) Eri Hozumi
3. (France) Estelle Cascino
4. (Australia) Jaimee Fourlis

=== Draw ===
==== First qualifier ====
| First round | | | | Qualifying competition |
| | | | | 1 | (Brazil) Laura Pigossi | 4 | 6 | 6 |
| | | | | 8 | (France) Marine Partaud | 6 | 2 | 2 |
| | (France) Mallaurie Noël | 4 | 3 | 8 | (France) Marine Partaud | 6 | 2 | 2 |
| 8 | (France) Marine Partaud | 6 | 6 |

==== Second qualifier ====
| First round | | | | Qualifying competition |
| | | | | Angelina Gabueva | 6 | 1 | 1 |
| | | | | (Japan) Eri Hozumi | 0 | 6 | 6 |
| | (Japan) Eri Hozumi | 6 | 6 | (Japan) Eri Hozumi | 0 | 6 | 6 |
| 7 | (Thailand) Peangtarn Plipuech | 4 | 4 |

==== Third qualifier ====
First round
3 | Anastasia Zakharova | 5 | 1
(France) Estelle Cascino | 7 | 6
(United States) Ingrid Neel | 0 | 4
5 | (France) Carole Monnet | 6 | 6

Qualifying competition
(France) Estelle Cascino | 6 | 4 | 6
5 | (France) Carole Monnet | 2 | 6 | 3

==== Fourth qualifier ====
First round
4 | (Australia) Jaimee Fourlis | 6 | 6
(France) Manon Arcangioli | 2 | 2
(Indonesia) Jessy Rompies | 2 | 1
6 | (Belgium) Magali Kempen | 6 | 6

Qualifying competition
4 | (Australia) Jaimee Fourlis | 6 | 6
6 | (Belgium) Magali Kempen | 4 | 3
