= 2022 Mutua Madrid Open – Women's singles =

Women's singles
- 2022 Mutua Madrid Open

Final
- Champion: (Tunisia) Ons Jabeur
- Runner-up: (United States) Jessica Pegula
- Score: 7–5, 0–6, 6–2

Details
- Draw: 64
- Seeds: 16

Events
Singles	men	women
Doubles	men	women
← 2021 ·	Madrid Open	· 2023 →

Ons Jabeur defeated Jessica Pegula in the final, 7–5, 0–6, 6–2 to win the women's singles tennis title at the 2022 Madrid Open. It was her first WTA 1000 title, and she became the first Arab and African woman to win a WTA 1000 title.

Aryna Sabalenka was the defending champion, but lost in the first round to Amanda Anisimova.

Pegula reached the final after being a match point down against Camila Giorgi in the first round.

This marked the last professional appearance of 2016 Olympic gold medalist Monica Puig; she lost to Danielle Collins in the first round.

== Seeds ==
1. (Poland) Iga Świątek (withdrew)
2. (Spain) Paula Badosa (second round)
3. Aryna Sabalenka (first round)
4. (Greece) Maria Sakkari (second round)
5. (Czech Republic) Karolína Plíšková (first round)
6. (United States) Danielle Collins (second round)
7. (Spain) Garbiñe Muguruza (second round)
8. (Tunisia) Ons Jabeur (champion)
9. (United Kingdom) Emma Raducanu (third round)

10. (Latvia) Jeļena Ostapenko (first round)
11. (Switzerland) Belinda Bencic (third round)
12. (United States) Jessica Pegula (final)
13. Anastasia Pavlyuchenkova (first round)
14. (United States) Coco Gauff (third round)
15. Victoria Azarenka (third round)
16. (Kazakhstan) Elena Rybakina (third round)
17. (Canada) Leylah Fernandez (second round)

Click on the seed number of a player to go to their draw section.

== Draw ==
=== Key ===
- Q = Qualifier
- WC = Wild card
- LL = Lucky loser
- Alt = Alternate
- ITF = ITF entry
- PR = Protected ranking
- SR = Special ranking
- SE = Special exempt
- JE = Junior exempt
- JR = Junior Accelerator Programme entrant
- CO = College Accelerator Programme entrant
- NG = Next Gen Accelerator Program entrant
- w/o = Walkover
- r = Retired
- d = Defaulted

=== Finals ===
Quarterfinals
(Switzerland) Jil Teichmann	6	6
(Ukraine) Anhelina Kalinina	3	4
(Spain) Sara Sorribes Tormo	4	2
12	(United States) Jessica Pegula	6	6
Q	Ekaterina Alexandrova	6	6
(United States) Amanda Anisimova	4	3
8	(Tunisia) Ons Jabeur	6	6
(Romania) Simona Halep	3	2

Semifinals
(Switzerland) Jil Teichmann	3	4
12	(United States) Jessica Pegula	6	6
Q	Ekaterina Alexandrova	2	3
8	(Tunisia) Ons Jabeur	6	6

Final
12	(United States) Jessica Pegula	5	6	2
8	(Tunisia) Ons Jabeur	7	0	6

=== Top half ===
==== Section 1 ====
First round
17	(Canada) L Fernandez	6	1	6
Q	(Germany) A Petkovic	1	6	4
(Switzerland) J Teichmann	6	7
(Czech Republic) P Kvitová	3	5
(Croatia) A Konjuh	6	4	2
(Czech Republic) K Siniaková	0	6	6
Q	(France) O Dodin	2	5
16	(Kazakhstan) E Rybakina	6	7
9	(United Kingdom) E Raducanu	7^{7}	6
(Czech Republic) T Martincová	6^{3}	0
WC	(Ukraine) M Kostyuk	6	6
(Denmark) C Tauson	3	2
(United States) S Stephens	5	4
(Ukraine) A Kalinina	7	6
(Australia) A Tomljanović	5	2
7	(Spain) G Muguruza	7	6

Second round
17	(Canada) L Fernandez	4	4
(Switzerland) J Teichmann	6	6
(Czech Republic) K Siniaková	0	0^{r}
16	(Kazakhstan) E Rybakina	6	1
9	(United Kingdom) E Raducanu	6	6
WC	(Ukraine) M Kostyuk	2	1
(Ukraine) A Kalinina	6	6
7	(Spain) G Muguruza	3	0

Third round
(Switzerland) J Teichmann	6	6
16	(Kazakhstan) E Rybakina	3	1
9	(United Kingdom) E Raducanu	2	6	4
(Ukraine) A Kalinina	6	2	6

Quarterfinals
(Switzerland) J Teichmann	6	6
(Ukraine) A Kalinina	3	4

==== Section 2 ====
First round
4	(Greece) M Sakkari	6^{8}	6	6
(United States) M Keys	7^{10}	3	4
Q	(Hungary) A Bondár	6	4	3
D Kasatkina	4	6	6
Q	A Potapova	3	1
WC	(Japan) N Osaka	6	6
(Spain) S Sorribes Tormo	6	2	6
13	A Pavlyuchenkova	3	6	3
12	(United States) J Pegula	7	2	7
(Italy) C Giorgi	5	6	5
WC	(Czech Republic) L Fruhvirtová	3	4
Q	(Estonia) K Kanepi	6	6
(Canada) B Andreescu	6	3	6
(United States) A Riske	4	6	0
WC	(Puerto Rico) M Puig	5	0
6	(United States) D Collins	7	6

Second round
4	(Greece) M Sakkari	6	3	1
D Kasatkina	3	6	6
WC	(Japan) N Osaka	3	1
(Spain) S Sorribes Tormo	6	6
12	(United States) J Pegula	6	6
Q	(Estonia) K Kanepi	3	3
(Canada) B Andreescu	6	6
6	(United States) D Collins	1	1

Third round
D Kasatkina	4	6	3
(Spain) S Sorribes Tormo	6	1	6
12	(United States) J Pegula	7	6
(Canada) B Andreescu	5	1

Quarterfinals
(Spain) S Sorribes Tormo	4	2
12	(United States) J Pegula	6	6

=== Bottom half ===
==== Section 3 ====
First round
5	(Czech Republic) Ka Plíšková	4	5
Q	(Czech Republic) M Bouzková	6	7
LL	(Belgium) G Minnen	3	2^{r}
Q	(Ukraine) D Yastremska	6	0
(Spain) N Párrizas Díaz	6	6
(Romania) S Cîrstea	4	2
Q	E Alexandrova	6	4	6
10	(Latvia) J Ostapenko	2	6	4
15	V Azarenka	7^{7}	6
(Switzerland) V Golubic	6^{5}	3
LL	(Brazil) B Haddad Maia	2	3
(Slovenia) T Zidanšek	6	6
L Samsonova	6^{6}	1
Q	(Croatia) P Martić	7^{8}	6
(United States) A Anisimova	6	3	6
3	A Sabalenka	2	6	4

Second round
Q	(Czech Republic) M Bouzková	3	7^{7}	6
Q	(Ukraine) D Yastremska	6	6^{3}	1
(Spain) N Párrizas Díaz	4	5
Q	E Alexandrova	6	7
15	V Azarenka	3	6	6
(Slovenia) T Zidanšek	6	1	3
Q	(Croatia) P Martić	6	3	2
(United States) A Anisimova	3	6	6

Third round
Q	(Czech Republic) M Bouzková	7^{7}	0	5
Q	E Alexandrova	6^{4}	6	7
15	V Azarenka	1	4
(United States) A Anisimova	6	6

Quarterfinals
Q	E Alexandrova	6	6
(United States) A Anisimova	4	3

==== Section 4 ====
First round
8	(Tunisia) O Jabeur	7^{11}	6
(Italy) J Paolini	6^{9}	1
(France) A Cornet	6	5	5
Q	V Gracheva	1	7	7
WC	(China) Q Zheng	6	3	4
PR	(Czech Republic) K Muchová	1	6	6
Q	(Romania) I-C Begu	4	1
11	(Switzerland) B Bencic	6	6
14	(United States) C Gauff	6	6
Q	(Slovakia) AK Schmiedlová	0	2
(Kazakhstan) Y Putintseva	7	7
(United States) S Rogers	5	5
(Romania) S Halep	6	6
(China) S Zhang	2	3
V Kudermetova	3	0
2	(Spain) P Badosa	6	6

Second round
8	(Tunisia) O Jabeur	7	0	6
Q	V Gracheva	5	6	4
PR	(Czech Republic) K Muchová	3	6	5
11	(Switzerland) B Bencic	6	4	7
14	(United States) C Gauff	6	2	6
(Kazakhstan) Y Putintseva	1	6	4
(Romania) S Halep	6	6
2	(Spain) P Badosa	3	1

Third round
8	(Tunisia) O Jabeur	6	3	6
11	(Switzerland) B Bencic	2	6	2
14	(United States) C Gauff	4	4
(Romania) S Halep	6	6

Quarterfinals
8	(Tunisia) O Jabeur	6	6
(Romania) S Halep	3	2

== Seeded players ==
The following are the seeded players based on the entry list as of 25 April 2022. Rankings and points before are as of 25 April 2022.

Seed	Rank	Player	Points before	Points defending	Points won	Points after	Status
~~1~~	~~1~~	~~(Poland) Iga Świątek~~	7,181	120	0	7,061	Withdrew due to right shoulder injury
2	2	(Spain) Paula Badosa	5,045	390	65	4,720	Second round lost to (Romania) Simona Halep
3	4	Aryna Sabalenka	4,711	1,000	10	3,721	First round lost to (United States) Amanda Anisimova
4	5	(Greece) Maria Sakkari	4,651	120	65	4,596	Second round lost to Daria Kasatkina
5	7	(Czech Republic) Karolína Plíšková	4,207	65	10	4,152	First round lost to (Czech Republic) Marie Bouzková [Q]
6	8	(United States) Danielle Collins	3,151	0	65	3,216	Second round lost to (Canada) Bianca Andreescu
7	9	(Spain) Garbiñe Muguruza	3,070	0	65	3,135	Second round lost to (Ukraine) Anhelina Kalinina
8	10	(Tunisia) Ons Jabeur	3,015	120	1,000	3,895	Champion, defeated (United States) Jessica Pegula [12]
9	11	(United Kingdom) Emma Raducanu	2,797	(3)^{†}	120	2,914	Third round lost to (Ukraine) Anhelina Kalinina
10	12	(Latvia) Jeļena Ostapenko	2,780	65	10	2,725	First round lost to Ekaterina Alexandrova [Q]
11	13	(Switzerland) Belinda Bencic	2,561	215	120	2,466	Third round lost to (Tunisia) Ons Jabeur [8]
12	14	(United States) Jessica Pegula	2,510	120	650	3,040	Runner-up, lost to (Tunisia) Ons Jabeur [8]
13	15	Anastasia Pavlyuchenkova	2,472	390	10	2,092	First round lost to (Spain) Sara Sorribes Tormo
14	16	(United States) Coco Gauff	2,300	10	120	2,410	Third round lost to (Romania) Simona Halep
15	17	Victoria Azarenka	2,281	65	120	2,336	Third round lost to (United States) Amanda Anisimova
16	18	(Kazakhstan) Elena Rybakina	2,261	65	120	2,316	Third round lost to (Switzerland) Jil Teichmann
17	20	(Canada) Leylah Fernandez	2,151	(25)^{†}	65	2,191	Second round lost to (Switzerland) Jil Teichmann

† The player did not qualify for the tournament in 2021. Accordingly, points from her 16th best tournament will be deducted instead.

=== Withdrawn players ===
The following players would have been seeded, but withdrew before the tournament began.

Rank	Player	Points before	Points defending	Points added	Points after	Withdrawal reason
3	(Czech Republic) Barbora Krejčíková	5,043	10+40	9+9^{†}	5,011	Elbow injury
6	(Estonia) Anett Kontaveit	4,511	65	0	4,446	Illness

† The player is not required to count zero points from this mandatory tournament due to a long-term injury exemption.

== Other entry information ==
=== Wildcards ===
- (Czech Republic) Linda Fruhvirtová
- (Ukraine) Marta Kostyuk
- (Japan) Naomi Osaka
- (Puerto Rico) Monica Puig
- (China) Zheng Qinwen

=== Protected ranking ===
- (Czech Republic) Karolína Muchová

=== Qualifiers ===
- Ekaterina Alexandrova
- (Romania) Irina-Camelia Begu
- (Hungary) Anna Bondár
- (Czech Republic) Marie Bouzková
- (France) Océane Dodin
- Varvara Gracheva
- (Estonia) Kaia Kanepi
- (Croatia) Petra Martić
- (Germany) Andrea Petkovic
- Anastasia Potapova
- (Slovakia) Anna Karolína Schmiedlová
- (Ukraine) Dayana Yastremska

=== Lucky losers ===
- (Brazil) Beatriz Haddad Maia
- (Belgium) Greet Minnen

=== Withdrawals ===
- (United States) Sofia Kenin → replaced by (Kazakhstan) Yulia Putintseva
- (Germany) Angelique Kerber → replaced by (Czech Republic) Kateřina Siniaková
- (Estonia) Anett Kontaveit → replaced by (Croatia) Ana Konjuh
- (Czech Republic) Barbora Krejčíková → replaced by (United States) Alison Riske
- (Belgium) Elise Mertens → replaced by (Brazil) Beatriz Haddad Maia
- (Colombia) Camila Osorio → replaced by (United States) Shelby Rogers
- (Ukraine) Elina Svitolina → replaced by (Ukraine) Anhelina Kalinina
- (Poland) Iga Świątek → replaced by (Belgium) Greet Minnen
- (Czech Republic) Markéta Vondroušová → replaced by (Spain) Nuria Párrizas Díaz

== Qualifying ==
=== Seeds ===
1. Ekaterina Alexandrova (qualified)
2. Aliaksandra Sasnovich (first round)
3. (United States) Madison Brengle (first round)
4. (Estonia) Kaia Kanepi (qualified)
5. (Poland) Magda Linette (qualifying competition)
6. (Croatia) Petra Martić (qualified)
7. (Egypt) Mayar Sherif (first round)
8. (Romania) Irina-Camelia Begu (qualified)
9. (Germany) Andrea Petkovic (qualified)
10. (Brazil) Beatriz Haddad Maia (qualifying competition, lucky loser)
11. (Hungary) Anna Bondár (qualified)
12. Varvara Gracheva (qualified)
13. (Czech Republic) Marie Bouzková (qualified)
14. Anastasia Potapova (qualified)
15. (Belgium) Greet Minnen (qualifying competition, lucky loser)
16. (Italy) Lucia Bronzetti (qualifying competition)
17. (Italy) Martina Trevisan (qualifying competition)
18. (Slovenia) Kaja Juvan (qualifying competition)
19. (Hungary) Panna Udvardy (first round)
20. (France) Clara Burel (qualifying competition)
21. (Slovakia) Kristína Kučová (first round)
22. (Poland) Magdalena Fręch (first round)
23. (Slovakia) Anna Karolína Schmiedlová (qualified)
24. (United States) Lauren Davis (first round)

=== Qualifiers ===
1. Ekaterina Alexandrova
2. (Czech Republic) Marie Bouzková
3. (Ukraine) Dayana Yastremska
4. (Estonia) Kaia Kanepi
5. (Slovakia) Anna Karolína Schmiedlová
6. (Croatia) Petra Martić
7. Anastasia Potapova
8. (Romania) Irina-Camelia Begu
9. (Germany) Andrea Petkovic
10. (France) Océane Dodin
11. (Hungary) Anna Bondár
12. Varvara Gracheva

=== Lucky losers ===
1. (Brazil) Beatriz Haddad Maia
2. (Belgium) Greet Minnen

=== Qualifying draw ===
==== First qualifier ====
First round
1	(Russia) Ekaterina Alexandrova	6	6
(Germany) Tamara Korpatsch	4	4
(France) Diane Parry	4	7^{7}	4
20	(France) Clara Burel	6	6^{5}	6

Qualifying competition
1	Ekaterina Alexandrova	6	6
20	(France) Clara Burel	1	1

==== Second qualifier ====
First round
2	Aliaksandra Sasnovich	4	2
(Montenegro) Danka Kovinić	6	6
WC	(France) Fiona Ferro	2	2
13	(Czech Republic) Marie Bouzková	6	6

Qualifying competition
(Montenegro) Danka Kovinić	5	4
13	(Czech Republic) Marie Bouzková	7	6

==== Third qualifier ====
First round
3	(United States) Madison Brengle	6	2	4
(Ukraine) Dayana Yastremska	2	6	6
(France) Harmony Tan	6	1	7^{7}
24	(United States) Lauren Davis	4	6	6^{5}

Qualifying competition
(Ukraine) Dayana Yastremska	6	7^{7}
(France) Harmony Tan	2	6^{4}

==== Fourth qualifier ====
First round
4	(Estonia) Kaia Kanepi	6	6
(United Kingdom) Harriet Dart	1	1
WC	(Spain) Cristina Bucșa	1	3
17	(Italy) Martina Trevisan	6	6

Qualifying competition
4	(Estonia) Kaia Kanepi	6	7
17	(Italy) Martina Trevisan	2	5

==== Fifth qualifier ====
First round
5	(Poland) Magda Linette	6	7
PR	(Ukraine) Kateryna Baindl	3	5
WC	(Spain) Jéssica Bouzas Maneiro	4	1
23	(Slovakia) Anna Karolína Schmiedlová	6	6

Qualifying competition
5	(Poland) Magda Linette	2	6	6^{4}
23	(Slovakia) Anna Karolína Schmiedlová	6	1	7^{7}

==== Sixth qualifier ====
First round
6	(Croatia) Petra Martić	2	6	7^{7}
(Hungary) Dalma Gálfi	6	4	6^{3}
WC	(Spain) Carlota Martínez Círez	6^{8}	0
16	(Italy) Lucia Bronzetti	7^{10}	6

Qualifying competition
6	(Croatia) Petra Martić	6	6
16	(Italy) Lucia Bronzetti	4	1

==== Seventh qualifier ====
First round
7	(Egypt) Mayar Sherif	6^{7}	5
(France) Kristina Mladenovic	7^{9}	7
PR	(Australia) Daria Saville	6	3	5
14	Anastasia Potapova	4	6	7

Qualifying competition
(France) Kristina Mladenovic	2	0
14	Anastasia Potapova	6	6

==== Eighth qualifier ====
First round
8	(Romania) Irina-Camelia Begu	6	6
(Georgia (country)) Ekaterine Gorgodze	2	4
Kamilla Rakhimova	6	6
22	(Poland) Magdalena Fręch	1	4

Qualifying competition
8	(Romania) Irina-Camelia Begu	6	6
Kamilla Rakhimova	1	0

==== Ninth qualifier ====
First round
9	(Germany) Andrea Petkovic	6	6
(Japan) Misaki Doi	4	2
(China) Wang Qiang	6	4	2
18	(Slovenia) Kaja Juvan	4	6	6

Qualifying competition
9	(Germany) Andrea Petkovic	7^{7}	6
18	(Slovenia) Kaja Juvan	6^{4}	4

==== Tenth qualifier ====
First round
10	(Brazil) Beatriz Haddad Maia	6	6
WC	Erika Andreeva	3	3
(France) Océane Dodin	6	4	6
19	(Hungary) Panna Udvardy	2	6	4

Qualifying competition
10	(Brazil) Beatriz Haddad Maia	6	6^{5}	2
(France) Océane Dodin	3	7^{7}	6

==== Eleventh qualifier ====
First round
11	(Hungary) Anna Bondár	6	6
WC	(Philippines) Alex Eala	0	0
(France) Chloé Paquet	5	3
15	(Belgium) Greet Minnen	7	6

Qualifying competition
11	(Hungary) Anna Bondár	6	6
15	(Belgium) Greet Minnen	4	2

==== Twelfth qualifier ====
First round
12	Varvara Gracheva	6	6
(Australia) Maddison Inglis	2	3
(United Kingdom) Heather Watson	6	6
21	(Slovakia) Kristína Kučová	4	0

Qualifying competition
12	Varvara Gracheva	6	6
(United Kingdom) Heather Watson	3	2
