= 2021 Mutua Madrid Open – Women's singles =

Women's singles
- 2021 Mutua Madrid Open

Final
- Champion: (Belarus) Aryna Sabalenka
- Runner-up: (Australia) Ashleigh Barty
- Score: 6–0, 3–6, 6–4

Details
- Draw: 64 (12 Q/ 5 WC)
- Seeds: 16

Events
Singles	men	women
Doubles	men	women
← 2019 ·	Mutua Madrid Open	· 2022 →

Aryna Sabalenka defeated Ashleigh Barty in the final, 6–0, 3–6, 6–4 to win the women's singles tennis title at the 2021 Madrid Open. It was her tenth career WTA Tour singles title, and her first on clay.

Kiki Bertens was the defending champion from when the tournament was last held in 2019, but lost in the second round to Veronika Kudermetova.

Paula Badosa became the first Spaniard in the tournament's history to reach the semifinals.

== Seeds ==
1. (Australia) Ashleigh Barty (final)
2. (Japan) Naomi Osaka (second round)
3. (Romania) Simona Halep (third round)
4. (Ukraine) Elina Svitolina (first round)
5. (Belarus) Aryna Sabalenka (champion)
6. (Czech Republic) Karolína Plíšková (second round)
7. (Netherlands) Kiki Bertens (second round)
8. (Switzerland) Belinda Bencic (quarterfinals)

9. (Czech Republic) Petra Kvitová (quarterfinals)
10. (Spain) Garbiñe Muguruza (withdrew)
11. (United States) Jennifer Brady (third round)
12. (Belarus) Victoria Azarenka (second round, withdrew)
13. (Belgium) Elise Mertens (quarterfinals, retired)
14. (Poland) Iga Świątek (third round)
15. (United Kingdom) Johanna Konta (second round)
16. (Greece) Maria Sakkari (third round)

Click on the seed number of a player to go to their draw section.

== Draw ==
=== Key ===
- Q = Qualifier
- WC = Wild card
- LL = Lucky loser
- Alt = Alternate
- SE = Special exempt
- PR = Protected ranking
- ITF = ITF entry
- JE = Junior exempt
- w/o = Walkover
- r = Retired
- d = Defaulted
- SR = Special ranking

=== Finals ===
Quarterfinals
1	(Australia) Ashleigh Barty	6	3	6
9	(Czech Republic) Petra Kvitová	1	6	3
WC	(Spain) Paula Badosa	6	7
8	(Switzerland) Belinda Bencic	4	5
5	(Belarus) Aryna Sabalenka	6	4
13	(Belgium) Elise Mertens	1	0^{r}
(Russia) Anastasia Pavlyuchenkova	7^{7}	7^{7}
(Czech Republic) Karolína Muchová	6^{4}	6^{2}

Semifinals
1	(Australia) Ashleigh Barty	6	6
WC	(Spain) Paula Badosa	4	3
5	(Belarus) Aryna Sabalenka	6	6
(Russia) Anastasia Pavlyuchenkova	2	3

Final
1	(Australia) Ashleigh Barty	0	6	4
5	(Belarus) Aryna Sabalenka	6	3	6

=== Top half ===
==== Section 1 ====
First round
1	(Australia) A Barty	6	6
(United States) S Rogers	2	1
LL	(Chinese Taipei) S-w Hsieh	2	4
Q	(Slovenia) T Zidanšek	6	6
Q	(Ukraine) K Kozlova	4	2
Q	(Germany) L Siegemund	6	6
(United States) A Riske	1	1
14	(Poland) I Świątek	6	6
9	(Czech Republic) P Kvitová	6	2
(Czech Republic) M Bouzková	2	3^{r}
(Germany) A Kerber	7^{7}	6
(Czech Republic) M Vondroušová	6^{5}	1
(Russia) V Kudermetova	6	6
PR	(Russia) E Vesnina	1	4
WC	(Andorra) V Jiménez Kasintseva	4	0
7	(Netherlands) K Bertens	6	6

Second round
1	(Australia) A Barty	6	1	6
Q	(Slovenia) T Zidanšek	4	6	3
Q	(Germany) L Siegemund	3	3
14	(Poland) I Świątek	6	6
9	(Czech Republic) P Kvitová	6	7
(Germany) A Kerber	4	5
(Russia) V Kudermetova	6	6
7	(Netherlands) K Bertens	4	3

Third round
1	(Australia) A Barty	7	6
14	(Poland) I Świątek	5	4
9	(Czech Republic) P Kvitová	6	4	6
(Russia) V Kudermetova	3	6	4

Quarterfinals
1	(Australia) A Barty	6	3	6
9	(Czech Republic) P Kvitová	1	6	3

==== Section 2 ====
First round
4	(Ukraine) E Svitolina	6	4	6^{5}
(Switzerland) J Teichmann	2	6	7^{7}
WC	(Spain) P Badosa	6	7
(Czech Republic) B Krejčíková	1	5
Q	(Romania) A Bogdan	0	3
Q	(Latvia) A Sevastova	6	6
(Kazakhstan) Y Putintseva	4	2
15	(United Kingdom) J Konta	6	6
LL	(Montenegro) D Kovinić	4	1
(United States) S Stephens	6	6
PR	(Kazakhstan) Y Shvedova	2	3
(Tunisia) O Jabeur	6	6
(Croatia) P Martić	3	2
Q	(United States) B Pera	6	6
Q	(France) K Mladenovic	4	2
8	(Switzerland) B Bencic	6	6

Second round
(Switzerland) J Teichmann	7	1	2
WC	(Spain) P Badosa	5	6	6
Q	(Latvia) A Sevastova	6	6
15	(United Kingdom) J Konta	3	3
(United States) S Stephens	6	1	3
(Tunisia) O Jabeur	4	6	6
Q	(United States) B Pera	6	1	6^{5}
8	(Switzerland) B Bencic	3	6	7^{7}

Third round
WC	(Spain) P Badosa	6^{0}	7^{7}	6
Q	(Latvia) A Sevastova	7^{7}	6^{3}	0
(Tunisia) O Jabeur	6^{2}	3^{r}
8	(Switzerland) B Bencic	7^{7}	4

Quarterfinals
WC	(Spain) P Badosa	6	7
8	(Switzerland) B Bencic	4	5

=== Bottom half ===
==== Section 3 ====
First round
5	(Belarus) A Sabalenka	6	6
Q	(Russia) V Zvonareva	1	2
Q	(Romania) I-C Begu	6	4	6^{1}
(Russia) D Kasatkina	4	6	7^{7}
(United States) J Pegula	7^{7}	6
WC	(Romania) S Cîrstea	6^{5}	3
(Russia) E Alexandrova	5	6	1
12	(Belarus) V Azarenka	7	3	6
13	(Belgium) E Mertens	6	6
(China) S Zhang	3	3
Q	(Australia) A Tomljanović	4	0
(Kazakhstan) E Rybakina	6	6
(Poland) M Linette	2	6	1
(China) S Zheng	6	3	6
WC	(Spain) S Sorribes Tormo	0	5
3	(Romania) S Halep	6	7

Second round
5	(Belarus) A Sabalenka	6	6
(Russia) D Kasatkina	3	3
(United States) J Pegula	w/o
12	(Belarus) V Azarenka
13	(Belgium) E Mertens	7^{7}	7
(Kazakhstan) E Rybakina	6^{4}	5
(China) S Zheng	0	4
3	(Romania) S Halep	6	6

Third round
5	(Belarus) A Sabalenka	6	6
(United States) J Pegula	1	2
13	(Belgium) E Mertens	4	7	7
3	(Romania) S Halep	6	5	5

Quarterfinals
5	(Belarus) A Sabalenka	6	4
13	(Belgium) E Mertens	1	0^{r}

==== Section 4 ====
First round
6	(Czech Republic) Ka Plíšková	5	6	6
(United States) C Gauff	7	3	2
(Russia) A Pavlyuchenkova	7	6
(United States) M Keys	5	2
LL	(Slovenia) P Hercog	3	1
(Latvia) J Ostapenko	6	6
WC	(United States) V Williams	2	4
11	(United States) J Brady	6	6
16	(Greece) M Sakkari	0	6	6
(United States) A Anisimova	6	1	4
Q	(Serbia) N Stojanović	6^{4}	5
(Estonia) A Kontaveit	7^{7}	7
(China) Q Wang	1	3
(Czech Republic) K Muchová	6	6
Q	(Japan) M Doi	5	2
2	(Japan) N Osaka	7	6

Second round
6	(Czech Republic) Ka Plíšková	0	5
(Russia) A Pavlyuchenkova	6	7
(Latvia) J Ostapenko	2	1
11	(United States) J Brady	6	6
16	(Greece) M Sakkari	6	6
(Estonia) A Kontaveit	3	1
(Czech Republic) K Muchová	6	3	6
2	(Japan) N Osaka	4	6	1

Third round
(Russia) A Pavlyuchenkova	7	6^{8}	6
11	(United States) J Brady	5	7^{10}	3
16	(Greece) M Sakkari	0	7^{11}	5
(Czech Republic) K Muchová	6	6^{9}	7

Quarterfinals
(Russia) A Pavlyuchenkova	7^{7}	7^{7}
(Czech Republic) K Muchová	6^{4}	6^{2}

== Qualifying ==
=== Seeds ===
1. (Latvia) Anastasija Sevastova (qualified)
2. (France) Kristina Mladenovic (qualified)
3. (Germany) Laura Siegemund (qualified)
4. (France) Alizé Cornet (first round)
5. (Montenegro) Danka Kovinić (qualifying competition, lucky loser)
6. (Chinese Taipei) Hsieh Su-wei (qualifying competition, lucky loser)
7. (Estonia) Kaia Kanepi (first round)
8. (Czech Republic) Kateřina Siniaková (first round)
9. (Belgium) Alison Van Uytvanck (first round)
10. (United Kingdom) Heather Watson (first round)
11. (United States) Bernarda Pera (qualified)
12. (Canada) Leylah Annie Fernandez (first round)
13. (Slovenia) Polona Hercog (qualifying competition, lucky loser)
14. (Romania) Irina-Camelia Begu (qualified)
15. (Russia) Anastasia Potapova (qualifying competition)
16. (Ukraine) Marta Kostyuk (qualifying competition)
17. (Australia) Ajla Tomljanović (qualified)
18. (Japan) Misaki Doi (qualified)
19. (Slovenia) Tamara Zidanšek (qualified)
20. (Japan) Nao Hibino (qualifying competition)
21. (Netherlands) Arantxa Rus (first round)
22. (Serbia) Nina Stojanović (qualified)
23. (Kazakhstan) Zarina Diyas (qualifying competition)
24. (Belarus) Aliaksandra Sasnovich (qualifying competition)

=== Qualifiers ===
1. (Latvia) Anastasija Sevastova
2. (France) Kristina Mladenovic
3. (Germany) Laura Siegemund
4. (Australia) Ajla Tomljanović
5. (Japan) Misaki Doi
6. (Slovenia) Tamara Zidanšek
7. (Ukraine) Kateryna Kozlova
8. (Romania) Ana Bogdan
9. (Russia) Vera Zvonareva
10. (Romania) Irina-Camelia Begu
11. (United States) Bernarda Pera
12. (Serbia) Nina Stojanović

=== Lucky losers ===
1. (Chinese Taipei) Hsieh Su-wei
2. (Montenegro) Danka Kovinić
3. (Slovenia) Polona Hercog

=== Draw ===
==== First qualifier ====
First round
1	(Latvia) Anastasija Sevastova	3	6	6
(Bulgaria) Tsvetana Pironkova	6	4	3
(Russia) Margarita Gasparyan	4	1
16	(Ukraine) Marta Kostyuk	6	6

Qualifying competition
1	(Latvia) Anastasija Sevastova	6	7
16	(Ukraine) Marta Kostyuk	1	5

==== Second qualifier ====
First round
2	(France) Kristina Mladenovic	6	5	7^{7}
WC	(Spain) Ane Mintegi del Olmo	3	7	6^{1}
(Russia) Varvara Gracheva	4	6^{2}
15	(Russia) Anastasia Potapova	6	7^{7}

Qualifying competition
2	(France) Kristina Mladenovic	6	6
15	(Russia) Anastasia Potapova	4	2

==== Third qualifier ====
First round
3	(Germany) Laura Siegemund	6	6
(Germany) Andrea Petkovic	2	4
WC	(Spain) Jéssica Bouzas Maneiro	5	6	1
24	(Belarus) Aliaksandra Sasnovich	7	4	6

Qualifying competition
3	(Germany) Laura Siegemund	4	6	6
24	(Belarus) Aliaksandra Sasnovich	6	1	0

==== Fourth qualifier ====
First round
4	(France) Alizé Cornet	1	6	6^{6}
(China) Wang Xiyu	6	4	7^{8}
PR	(Germany) Mona Barthel	4	1
17	(Australia) Ajla Tomljanović	6	6

Qualifying competition
(China) Wang Xiyu	6^{4}	1
17	(Australia) Ajla Tomljanović	7^{7}	6

==== Fifth qualifier ====
First round
5	(Montenegro) Danka Kovinić	6	6
WC	(Spain) Marta Custic	3	2
WC	(Spain) Eva Guerrero Álvarez	3	2
18	(Japan) Misaki Doi	6	6

Qualifying competition
5	(Montenegro) Danka Kovinić	2	4
18	(Japan) Misaki Doi	6	6

==== Sixth qualifier ====
First round
6	(Chinese Taipei) Hsieh Su-wei	1	7^{8}	6
WC	(Romania) Jaqueline Cristian	6	6^{6}	0
(Slovenia) Kaja Juvan	7^{8}	1	3
19	(Slovenia) Tamara Zidanšek	6^{6}	6	6

Qualifying competition
6	(Chinese Taipei) Hsieh Su-wei	1	0
19	(Slovenia) Tamara Zidanšek	6	6

==== Seventh qualifier ====
First round
7	(Estonia) Kaia Kanepi	1	4
PR	(Ukraine) Kateryna Kozlova	6	6
(Italy) Martina Trevisan	2	4
23	(Kazakhstan) Zarina Diyas	6	6

Qualifying competition
PR	(Ukraine) Kateryna Kozlova	6	6
23	(Kazakhstan) Zarina Diyas	4	4

==== Eighth qualifier ====
First round
8	(Czech Republic) Kateřina Siniaková	6^{7}	5
(Romania) Ana Bogdan	7^{9}	7
(France) Océane Dodin	2	6	3
20	(Japan) Nao Hibino	6	3	6

Qualifying competition
(Romania) Ana Bogdan	4	6	6
20	(Japan) Nao Hibino	6	3	4

==== Ninth qualifier ====
First round
9	(Belgium) Alison Van Uytvanck	6	2	0
(Slovakia) Anna Karolína Schmiedlová	0	6	6
PR	(Russia) Vera Zvonareva	6	6
21	(Netherlands) Arantxa Rus	3	2

Qualifying competition
(Slovakia) Anna Karolína Schmiedlová	2	1
PR	(Russia) Vera Zvonareva	6	6

==== Tenth qualifier ====
First round
10	(United Kingdom) Heather Watson	3	3
(Switzerland) Stefanie Vögele	6	6
(Russia) Anna Kalinskaya	6	6^{4}	0
14	(Romania) Irina-Camelia Begu	4	7^{7}	6

Qualifying competition
(Switzerland) Stefanie Vögele	3	3
14	(Romania) Irina-Camelia Begu	6	6

==== Eleventh qualifier ====
First round
11	(United States) Bernarda Pera	6	4	6
(Spain) Aliona Bolsova	4	6	3
(China) Wang Yafan	4	2
13	(Slovenia) Polona Hercog	6	6

Qualifying competition
11	(United States) Bernarda Pera	6	5	6
13	(Slovenia) Polona Hercog	4	7	4

==== Twelfth qualifier ====
First round
12	(Canada) Leylah Annie Fernandez	6^{6}	6	4
WC	(Croatia) Ana Konjuh	7^{8}	2	6
(Italy) Jasmine Paolini	4	7^{7}	4
22	(Serbia) Nina Stojanović	6	6^{5}	6

Qualifying competition
WC	(Croatia) Ana Konjuh	4	2
22	(Serbia) Nina Stojanović	6	6

== WTA singles main draw entrants ==
=== Seeds ===
The following are the seeded players. Seedings are based on WTA rankings as of 26 April 2021. Rankings and points before are as of 26 April 2021.

Seed	Rank	Player	Points before	Points defending	Points won	Points after	Status
1	1	(Australia) Ashleigh Barty	9,655	215	650	10,090	Runner-up, lost to (Belarus) Aryna Sabalenka [5]
2	2	(Japan) Naomi Osaka	7,800	215	65	7,650	Second round lost to (Czech Republic) Karolína Muchová
3	3	(Romania) Simona Halep	7,050	650	120	6,520	Third round lost to (Belgium) Elise Mertens [13]
4	5	(Ukraine) Elina Svitolina	5,835	10	10	5,835	First round lost to (Switzerland) Jil Teichmann
5	7	(Belarus) Aryna Sabalenka	5,205	10	1000	6,195	Champion, defeated (Australia) Ashleigh Barty [1]
6	9	(Czech Republic) Karolína Plíšková	4,660	65	65	4,660	Second round lost to (Russia) Anastasia Pavlyuchenkova
7	10	(Netherlands) Kiki Bertens	4,405	1,000	65	3,470	Second round lost to (Russia) Veronika Kudermetova
8	11	(Switzerland) Belinda Bencic	4,315	390	215	4,140	Quarterfinals lost to (Spain) Paula Badosa [WC]
9	12	(Czech Republic) Petra Kvitová	4,160	215	215	4,160	Quarterfinals lost to (Australia) Ashleigh Barty [1]
~~10~~	~~13~~	~~(Spain) Garbiñe Muguruza~~	4,120	10	0	4,110	Withdrew due to a leg injury
11	14	(United States) Jennifer Brady	3,765	(55)^{†}	120	3,830	Third round lost to (Russia) Anastasia Pavlyuchenkova
12	15	(Belarus) Victoria Azarenka	3,526	65	65	3,526	Second round, withdrew due to a back injury
13	16	(Belgium) Elise Mertens	3,480	10	215	3,685	Quarterfinals retired against (Belarus) Aryna Sabalenka [5]
14	17	(Poland) Iga Świątek	3,453	(18)^{†}	120	3,555	Third round lost to (Australia) Ashleigh Barty [1]
15	18	(United Kingdom) Johanna Konta	3,236	65	65	3,236	Second round lost to (Latvia) Anastasija Sevastova [Q]
16	19	(Greece) Maria Sakkari	3,020	10	120	3,130	Third round lost to (Czech Republic) Karolína Muchová

† The player did not qualify for the tournament in 2019. Accordingly, this was her 16th best result deducted instead.

=== Other entrants ===
The following players received wildcards into the main draw:

- (Spain) Paula Badosa
- (Romania) Sorana Cîrstea
- (Andorra) Victoria Jiménez Kasintseva
- (Spain) Sara Sorribes Tormo
- (United States) Venus Williams

The following players received entry using a protected ranking:

- (Kazakhstan) Yaroslava Shvedova
- (Russia) Elena Vesnina

The following players received entry from the qualifying draw:

- (Romania) Irina-Camelia Begu
- (Romania) Ana Bogdan
- (Japan) Misaki Doi
- (Ukraine) Kateryna Kozlova
- (France) Kristina Mladenovic
- (United States) Bernarda Pera
- (Latvia) Anastasija Sevastova
- (Germany) Laura Siegemund
- (Serbia) Nina Stojanović
- (Australia) Ajla Tomljanović
- (Slovenia) Tamara Zidanšek
- (Russia) Vera Zvonareva

The following players received entry as lucky losers:

- (Slovenia) Polona Hercog
- (Chinese Taipei) Hsieh Su-wei
- (Montenegro) Danka Kovinić

=== Withdrawals ===
Before the tournament

- (Canada) Bianca Andreescu → replaced by (China) Zheng Saisai
- (United States) Danielle Collins → replaced by (Poland) Magda Linette
- (France) Fiona Ferro → replaced by (Russia) Elena Vesnina
- (United States) Sofia Kenin → replaced by (United States) Shelby Rogers
- (Russia) Svetlana Kuznetsova → replaced by (Slovenia) Polona Hercog
- (Spain) Garbiñe Muguruza → replaced by (Montenegro) Danka Kovinić
- (Czech Republic) Barbora Strýcová → replaced by (Kazakhstan) Yaroslava Shvedova
- (Croatia) Donna Vekić → replaced by (United States) Sloane Stephens
- (United States) Serena Williams → replaced by (Chinese Taipei) Hsieh Su-wei
- (Ukraine) Dayana Yastremska → replaced by (Latvia) Jeļena Ostapenko

During the tournament

- (Belarus) Victoria Azarenka

=== Retirements ===
- (Czech Republic) Marie Bouzková
- (Belgium) Elise Mertens
