= 2018 Koser Jewelers Tennis Challenge – Singles =

Singles
- 2018 Koser Jewelers Tennis Challenge

Final
- Champion: (United States) Madison Brengle
- Runner-up: (United States) Kristie Ahn
- Score: 6–4, 1–0, ret.

Events
Singles	Doubles
← 2017 ·	Koser Jewelers Tennis Challenge	· 2019 →

Vera Lapko was the defending champion, but chose to participate in Montreal.

Madison Brengle won the title after Kristie Ahn retired in the final at 6–4, 1–0.

== Seeds ==
1. (United States) Nicole Gibbs (first round)
2. (Netherlands) Arantxa Rus (first round)
3. (United States) Madison Brengle (champion)
4. (Russia) Vera Zvonareva (first round)
5. (United Kingdom) Heather Watson (first round)
6. (Russia) Anastasia Potapova (second round)
7. (Ukraine) Anhelina Kalinina (quarterfinals)
8. (United Kingdom) Naomi Broady (first round)

== Draw ==
=== Key ===
- Q = Qualifier
- WC = Wild card
- LL = Lucky loser
- Alt = Alternate
- SE = Special exempt
- PR = Protected ranking
- ITF = ITF entry
- JE = Junior exempt
- w/o = Walkover
- r = Retired
- d = Defaulted
- SR = Special ranking

=== Finals ===
Semifinals
(Australia) Priscilla Hon	5	5
3	(United States) Madison Brengle	7	7
PR	(United States) Jessica Pegula	7^{7}	6^{7}	4
(United States) Kristie Ahn	6^{3}	7^{9}	6

Final
3	(United States) Madison Brengle	6	1
(United States) Kristie Ahn	4	0^{r}

=== Top half ===
First round
1	(United States) N Gibbs	6	6^{5}	2
(Australia) P Hon	4	7^{7}	6
(Australia) O Rogowska	7^{8}	6
WC	(United States) L Davis	6^{6}	4
(United States) F Di Lorenzo	6	6
(United States) J Loeb	2	3
Q	(United States) H Carter	2	2
7	(Ukraine) A Kalinina	6	6
3	(United States) M Brengle	7^{7}	2	6
(Australia) Ar Rodionova	6^{3}	6	1
WC	(United States) J Kissell	0	2
(United Kingdom) G Taylor	6	6
(Germany) S Lisicki	6	7^{7}
(United States) G Min	1	6^{5}
SE	(United States) A Li	6	7^{9}
5	(United Kingdom) H Watson	1	6^{7}

Second round
(Australia) P Hon	6	7
(Australia) O Rogowska	2	5
(United States) F Di Lorenzo	3	2
7	(Ukraine) A Kalinina	6	6
3	(United States) M Brengle	4	6	0
(United Kingdom) G Taylor	6	3	0^{r}
(Germany) S Lisicki	3	3^{r}
SE	(United States) A Li	6	4

Quarterfinals
(Australia) P Hon	7^{7}	3
7	(Ukraine) A Kalinina	6^{5}	0^{r}
3	(United States) M Brengle	6	6
SE	(United States) A Li	0	2

Semifinals
(Australia) P Hon	5	5
3	(United States) M Brengle	7	7

=== Bottom half ===
First round
6	(Russia) A Potapova	2	6	6
Q	(Japan) R Ozaki	6	4	0
WC	(United States) G Brodsky	6	5	7
WC	(United States) S Chang	2	7	5
PR	(Belarus) O Govortsova	4
(Hungary) F Stollár	0^{r}
PR	(United States) J Pegula	6	6
4	(Russia) V Zvonareva	4	3
8	(United Kingdom) N Broady	2	6^{4}
(United States) K Ahn	6	7^{7}
LL	(Japan) E Hozumi	3	2
(United Kingdom) K Swan	6	6
Q	(Australia) K Birrell	7^{7}	6
Q	(France) J Ponchet	6^{5}	1
(Spain) G García Pérez	6	6
2	(Netherlands) A Rus	4	0

Second round
6	(Russia) A Potapova	2	6^{5}
WC	(United States) G Brodsky	6	7^{7}
PR	(Belarus) O Govortsova	2	2
PR	(United States) J Pegula	6	6
(United States) K Ahn	w/o
(United Kingdom) K Swan
Q	(Australia) K Birrell	6	7^{7}
(Spain) G García Pérez	2	6^{3}

Quarterfinals
WC	(United States) G Brodsky	2	4
PR	(United States) J Pegula	6	6
(United States) K Ahn	4	6	6
Q	(Australia) K Birrell	6	4	4

Semifinals
PR	(United States) J Pegula	7^{7}	6^{7}	4
(United States) K Ahn	6^{3}	7^{9}	6
