= 2022 L'Open 35 de Saint-Malo – Doubles =

Doubles
- 2022 L'Open 35 de Saint-Malo

Final
- Champions: (Japan) Eri Hozumi (Japan) Makoto Ninomiya
- Runners-up: (France) Estelle Cascino (France) Jessika Ponchet
- Score: 7–6^{(7–1)}, 6–1

Events
Singles	Doubles
← 2021 ·	L'Open 35 de Saint-Malo	· 2023 →

Kaitlyn Christian and Sabrina Santamaria were the defending champions, but chose not to participate together. Christian signed up with Lidziya Marozava, but they withdrew before the start of the tournament because they were still playing at the Madrid Open. Santamaria played alongside Miyu Kato but lost in the quarterfinals to Julia Lohoff and Renata Voráčová.

Eri Hozumi and Makoto Ninomiya won the title, defeating Estelle Cascino and Jessika Ponchet in the final, 7–6^{(7–1)}, 6–1.

== Seeds ==
1. (Poland) Magda Linette / (United States) Bernarda Pera (first round)
2. (Japan) Eri Hozumi / (Japan) Makoto Ninomiya (champions)
3. (United States) Kaitlyn Christian / Lidziya Marozava (withdrew)
4. (Japan) Miyu Kato / (United States) Sabrina Santamaria (quarterfinals)
5. (Brazil) Beatriz Haddad Maia / (Egypt) Mayar Sherif (quarterfinals, withdrew)

== Draw ==
=== Key ===
- Q = Qualifier
- WC = Wild card
- LL = Lucky loser
- Alt = Alternate
- SE = Special exempt
- PR = Protected ranking
- ITF = ITF entry
- JE = Junior exempt
- w/o = Walkover
- r = Retired
- d = Defaulted
- SR = Special ranking

=== Draw ===
First round
1	(Poland) M Linette (United States) B Pera	6	6^{2}	[10]
(Thailand) P Plipuech (Indonesia) J Rompies	1	7^{7}	[12]
5	(Brazil) B Haddad Maia (Egypt) M Sherif	6	7
(Poland) M Fręch (Canada) R Marino	4	5
A Gabueva; A Zakharova	6	7
(France) T Andrianjafitrimo (France) F Ferro	3	5
(Germany) J Lohoff (Czech Republic) R Voráčová	7	6^{6}	[10]
A Kalinskaya; K Rakhimova	5	7^{8}	[6]
A Blinkova (Germany) T Korpatsch
4	(Japan) M Kato (United States) S Santamaria	w/o
(Australia) J Fourlis (Australia) M Inglis	1	6	[10]
(France) C Monnet (France) M Partaud	6	4	[7]
(United States) I Neel (Australia) A Sharma	2	4
2	(Japan) E Hozumi (Japan) M Ninomiya	6	6

Quarterfinals
(Thailand) P Plipuech (Indonesia) J Rompies	4	3
(France) E Cascino (France) J Ponchet	6	6
5	(Brazil) B Haddad Maia (Egypt) M Sherif
A Gabueva; A Zakharova	w/o
(Germany) J Lohoff (Czech Republic) R Voráčová	7	7^{7}
4	(Japan) M Kato (United States) S Santamaria	5	6^{4}
(Australia) J Fourlis (Australia) M Inglis	1	4
2	(Japan) E Hozumi (Japan) M Ninomiya	6	6

Semifinals
(France) E Cascino (France) J Ponchet	6	6
A Gabueva; A Zakharova	2	4
(Germany) J Lohoff (Czech Republic) R Voráčová	1	7	[10]
2	(Japan) E Hozumi (Japan) M Ninomiya	6	5	[12]

Final
(France) E Cascino (France) J Ponchet	6^{1}	1
2	(Japan) E Hozumi (Japan) M Ninomiya	7^{7}	6
