= 2018 Koser Jewelers Tennis Challenge – Doubles =

Doubles
- 2018 Koser Jewelers Tennis Challenge

Final
- Champions: (Australia) Ellen Perez (Australia) Arina Rodionova
- Runners-up: (Chinese Taipei) Chen Pei-hsuan (Chinese Taipei) Wu Fang-hsien
- Score: 6–0, 6–2

Events
Singles	Doubles
← 2017 ·	Koser Jewelers Tennis Challenge	· 2019 →

Sophie Chang and Alexandra Mueller were the defending champions, but lost in the first round to Luisa Stefani and Renata Zarazúa.

Ellen Perez and Arina Rodionova won the title, defeating Chen Pei-hsuan and Wu Fang-hsien in the final, 6–0, 6–2.

== Seeds ==
1. (Australia) Ellen Perez / (Australia) Arina Rodionova (champions)
2. (United States) Jamie Loeb / (United States) Sabrina Santamaria (first round)
3. (Czech Republic) Lucie Hradecká / (Netherlands) Arantxa Rus (first round)
4. (Russia) Anastasia Potapova / (Russia) Vera Zvonareva (semifinals; retired)

== Draw ==
=== Key ===
- Q = Qualifier
- WC = Wild card
- LL = Lucky loser
- Alt = Alternate
- SE = Special exempt
- PR = Protected ranking
- ITF = ITF entry
- JE = Junior exempt
- w/o = Walkover
- r = Retired
- d = Defaulted
- SR = Special ranking

=== Draw ===
First round
(United States) S Chang (United States) A Mueller	2	5
(Brazil) L Stefani (Mexico) R Zarazúa	6	7
4	(Russia) A Potapova (Russia) V Zvonareva	6	6
(United States) J Elie (United States) J Robinson	2	2
(Belarus) O Govortsova (Russia) N Kukharchuk	5	4
(United Kingdom) G Taylor (United Kingdom) E Webley-Smith	7	6
(United States) K Ahn (Ukraine) A Kalinina	6	0
(United Kingdom) H Dart (United Kingdom) K Dunne	0	0^{r}
(Russia) N Dzalamidze (Russia) V Savinykh	6	3	[13]
3	(Czech Republic) L Hradecká (Netherlands) A Rus	2	6	[11]
(Mexico) V Rodríguez (Australia) O Tjandramulia	3	2
(United States) H Carter (United States) E Shibahara	6	6
(Chinese Taipei) P-h Chen (Chinese Taipei) F-h Wu	6	6^{4}	[10]
2	(United States) J Loeb (United States) S Santamaria	3	7^{7}	[7]

Quarterfinals
1	(Australia) E Perez (Australia) Ar Rodionova	7	6
(Brazil) L Stefani (Mexico) R Zarazúa	5	4
4	(Russia) A Potapova (Russia) V Zvonareva	w/o
(United Kingdom) G Taylor (United Kingdom) E Webley-Smith
(United States) K Ahn (Ukraine) A Kalinina	2	6	[10]
(Russia) N Dzalamidze (Russia) V Savinykh	6	1	[7]
(United States) H Carter (United States) E Shibahara	6	4	[4]
(Chinese Taipei) P-h Chen (Chinese Taipei) F-h Wu	3	6	[10]

Semifinals
1	(Australia) E Perez (Australia) Ar Rodionova	3
4	(Russia) A Potapova (Russia) V Zvonareva	2^{r}
(United States) K Ahn (Ukraine) A Kalinina	3	3
(Chinese Taipei) P-h Chen (Chinese Taipei) F-h Wu	6	6

Final
1	(Australia) E Perez (Australia) Ar Rodionova	6	6
(Chinese Taipei) P-h Chen (Chinese Taipei) F-h Wu	0	2
