= 2019 Koser Jewelers Tennis Challenge – Singles =

Singles
- 2019 Koser Jewelers Tennis Challenge

Final
- Champion: (United States) Madison Brengle
- Runner-up: (China) Zhu Lin
- Score: 6–4, 7–5

Events
| Singles | Doubles |
| ← 2018 · | Koser Jewelers Tennis Challenge | · 2021 → |

Madison Brengle was the defending champion, and successfully defended her title, defeating Zhu Lin in the final, 6–4, 7–5.

== Seeds ==
1. (United States) Madison Brengle (champion)
2. (China) Zhu Lin (final)
3. (Ukraine) Katarina Zavatska (quarterfinals)
4. (United Kingdom) Harriet Dart (second round)
5. (Belgium) Yanina Wickmayer (quarterfinals)
6. (Argentina) Paula Ormaechea (quarterfinals)
7. (United States) Robin Anderson (withdrew)
8. (Australia) Ellen Perez (second round)

== Draw ==
=== Key ===
- Q = Qualifier
- WC = Wild card
- LL = Lucky loser
- Alt = Alternate
- SE = Special exempt
- PR = Protected ranking
- ITF = ITF entry
- JE = Junior exempt
- w/o = Walkover
- r = Retired
- d = Defaulted
- SR = Special ranking

=== Finals ===
Semifinals
1 | (United States) Madison Brengle | 6 | 6
Q | (United States) Victoria Duval | 4 | 3
WC | (United States) Sophia Whittle | 0 | 1
2 | (China) Zhu Lin | 6 | 6

Final
1 | (United States) Madison Brengle | 6 | 7
2 | (China) Zhu Lin | 4 | 5

=== Top half ===
First round
1 | (United States) M Brengle | 6 | 2 | 6
Q | (Australia) L Cabrera | 3 | 6 | 3
Q | (Russia) A Gabueva | 6^{5} | 6 | 6
(Australia) Ar Rodionova | 7^{7} | 3 | 1
(Australia) Z Hives | 1 | 7^{7} | 2
(France) J Ponchet | 6 | 6^{5} | 6
(Chinese Taipei) E-s Liang | 6 | 6
LL | (Sweden) J Rosenqvist | 4 | 0
4 | (United Kingdom) H Dart | 7 | 3 | 6
SE | (United States) C Harrison | 5 | 6 | 1
WC | (United States) R Kingsley | 1 | 0
Q | (United States) V Duval | 6 | 6
(Russia) V Gracheva | 6 | 2 | 6
(China) S Xu | 1 | 6 | 0
Q | (United States) M Sanchez | 7 | 1 | 2
6 | (Argentina) P Ormaechea | 5 | 6 | 6

Second round
1 | (United States) M Brengle | 6 | 6
Q | (Russia) A Gabueva | 0 | 2
(France) J Ponchet | 3 | 5
(Chinese Taipei) E-s Liang | 6 | 7
4 | (United Kingdom) H Dart | 6^{5} | 3
Q | (United States) V Duval | 7^{7} | 6
(Russia) V Gracheva | 7 | 1 | 2
6 | (Argentina) P Ormaechea | 5 | 6 | 6

Quarterfinals
1 | (United States) M Brengle | 7 | 6
(Chinese Taipei) E-s Liang | 5 | 2
Q | (United States) V Duval | 6 | 6
6 | (Argentina) P Ormaechea | 2 | 3

Semifinals
1 | (United States) M Brengle | 6 | 6
Q | (United States) V Duval | 4 | 3

=== Bottom half ===
First round
8 | (Australia) E Perez | 7^{9} | 7^{8}
WC | (United States) J Loeb | 6^{7} | 6^{6}
Q | (Australia) A Bai | 4 | 1
WC | (United States) S Whittle | 6 | 6
(Israel) J Glushko | 3 | 7^{7} | 6
Q | (China) X You | 6 | 6^{2} | 0
Q | (United States) E Bolton | 3 | 2
3 | (Ukraine) K Zavatska | 6 | 6
5 | (Belgium) Y Wickmayer | 6 | 6
(Sweden) J Larsson | 4 | 2
WC | (United States) K Fahey | 2 | 6 | 5
(Japan) A Shimizu | 6 | 1 | 7
(Poland) M Fręch | 2 | 6 | 6
Q | (United States) C Liu | 6 | 2 | 1
LL | (Japan) A Okuno | 1 | 2
2 | (China) L Zhu | 6 | 6

Second round
8 | (Australia) E Perez | 3 | 2
WC | (United States) S Whittle | 6 | 6
(Israel) J Glushko | 1 | 3
3 | (Ukraine) K Zavatska | 6 | 6
5 | (Belgium) Y Wickmayer | 7^{7} | 6
(Japan) A Shimizu | 6^{4} | 4
(Poland) M Fręch | 6 | 2 | 2
2 | (China) L Zhu | 2 | 6 | 6

Quarterfinals
WC | (United States) S Whittle | 6 | 6
3 | (Ukraine) K Zavatska | 3 | 3
5 | (Belgium) Y Wickmayer | 3 | 2
2 | (China) L Zhu | 6 | 6

Semifinals
WC | (United States) S Whittle | 0 | 1
2 | (China) L Zhu | 6 | 6
