= 2019 Koser Jewelers Tennis Challenge – Doubles =

Doubles
- 2019 Koser Jewelers Tennis Challenge

Final
- Champions: (United States) Vania King (United States) Claire Liu
- Runners-up: (United States) Hayley Carter (United States) Jamie Loeb
- Score: 4–6, 6–2, [10–5]

Events
Singles	Doubles
← 2018 ·	Koser Jewelers Tennis Challenge	· 2021 →

Ellen Perez and Arina Rodionova were the defending champions, but lost in the quarterfinals to Vania King and Claire Liu.

King and Liu went on to win the title, defeating Hayley Carter and Jamie Loeb in the final, 4–6, 6–2, [10–5].

== Seeds ==
1. (Australia) Ellen Perez / (Australia) Arina Rodionova (quarterfinals)
2. (United States) Quinn Gleason / (Brazil) Luisa Stefani (semifinals)
3. (United Kingdom) Harriet Dart / (Belgium) Yanina Wickmayer (first round)
4. (Australia) Alison Bai / (France) Elixane Lechemia (first round)

== Draw ==
=== Key ===
- Q = Qualifier
- WC = Wild card
- LL = Lucky loser
- Alt = Alternate
- SE = Special exempt
- PR = Protected ranking
- ITF = ITF entry
- JE = Junior exempt
- w/o = Walkover
- r = Retired
- d = Defaulted
- SR = Special ranking

=== Draw ===
First round
1	(Australia) E Perez (Australia) Ar Rodionova	7^{7}	6
(United States) M Brengle (Australia) L Cabrera	6^{4}	4
(Chinese Taipei) P-h Chen (Chinese Taipei) Y-c Hsieh	7	2	[10]
WC	(United States) V King (United States) C Liu	5	6	[12]
4	(Australia) A Bai (France) E Lechemia	3	1
(Montenegro) V Babić (Japan) E Shibahara	6	6
(Japan) J Namigata (United Kingdom) E Webley-Smith	6	6
(United States) R Anderson (France) J Ponchet	4	4
WC	(United States) S Chang (United States) A Mueller	7	1	[10]
(Chinese Taipei) E-s Liang (China) L Zhu	5	6	[4]
(United States) H Carter (United States) J Loeb	6	6^{3}	[10]
3	(United Kingdom) H Dart (Belgium) Y Wickmayer	4	7^{7}	[4]
(Russia) V Gracheva (Ukraine) K Zavatska	4	4
WC	(United States) V Duval (United States) C Whoriskey	6	6
(United Kingdom) N Broady (Israel) J Glushko	4	1
2	(United States) Q Gleason (Brazil) L Stefani	6	6

Quarterfinals
1	(Australia) E Perez (Australia) Ar Rodionova	4	6^{4}
WC	(United States) V King (United States) C Liu	6	7^{7}
(Montenegro) V Babić (Japan) E Shibahara	6	4	[10]
(Japan) J Namigata (United Kingdom) E Webley-Smith	4	6	[8]
WC	(United States) S Chang (United States) A Mueller	2	4
(United States) H Carter (United States) J Loeb	6	6
WC	(United States) V Duval (United States) C Whoriskey	6	2	[4]
2	(United States) Q Gleason (Brazil) L Stefani	4	6	[10]

Semifinals
WC	(United States) V King (United States) C Liu	7	6
(Montenegro) V Babić (Japan) E Shibahara	5	4
(United States) H Carter (United States) J Loeb	6	7
2	(United States) Q Gleason (Brazil) L Stefani	4	5

Final
WC	(United States) V King (United States) C Liu	4	6	[10]
(United States) H Carter (United States) J Loeb	6	2	[5]
