= 2018 Koser Jewelers Tennis Challenge =

- Date: 6–12 August
- Edition: 12th
- Category: ITF Women's Circuit
- Prize money: $60,000
- Surface: Hard
- Location: Landisville, United States

Champions

Singles
- (United States) Madison Brengle

Doubles
- (Australia) Ellen Perez / (Australia) Arina Rodionova
| ← 2017 · | Koser Jewelers Tennis Challenge | · 2019 → |

The 2018 Koser Jewelers Tennis Challenge was a professional tennis tournament played on outdoor hard courts. It was the twelfth edition of the tournament and was part of the 2018 ITF Women's Circuit. It took place in Landisville, United States, on 6–12 August 2018.

== Singles main draw entrants ==
=== Seeds ===
| Country | Player | Rank^{1} | Seed |
|---|---|---|---|
| USA | Nicole Gibbs | 110 | 1 |
| NED | Arantxa Rus | 116 | 2 |
| USA | Madison Brengle | 120 | 3 |
| RUS | Vera Zvonareva | 131 | 4 |
| GBR | Heather Watson | 133 | 5 |
| RUS | Anastasia Potapova | 135 | 6 |
| UKR | Anhelina Kalinina | 143 | 7 |
| GBR | Naomi Broady | 147 | 8 |

- ^{1} Rankings as of 30 July 2018.

=== Other entrants ===
The following players received a wildcard into the singles main draw:

- (United States) Gail Brodsky
- (United States) Sophie Chang
- (United States) Lauren Davis
- (United States) Joelle Kissell

The following player received entry using a protected ranking:

- (Belarus) Olga Govortsova
- (United States) Jessica Pegula

The following player received entry by a special exempt:

- (United States) Ann Li

The following players received entry from the qualifying draw:

- (Australia) Kimberly Birrell
- (United States) Hayley Carter
- (Japan) Risa Ozaki
- (France) Jessika Ponchet

The following players received entry as a lucky loser:

- (Japan) Eri Hozumi

== Champions ==
=== Singles ===
- (United States) Madison Brengle def. (United States) Kristie Ahn, 6–4, 1–0, ret.

=== Doubles ===
- (Australia) Ellen Perez / (Australia) Arina Rodionova def. (Chinese Taipei) Chen Pei-hsuan / (Chinese Taipei) Wu Fang-hsien, 6–0, 6–2
