= 2023 L'Open 35 de Saint-Malo – Doubles =

Doubles
- 2023 L'Open 35 de Saint-Malo

Final
- Champions: (Belgium) Greet Minnen (Netherlands) Bibiane Schoofs
- Runners-up: (Norway) Ulrikke Eikeri (Japan) Eri Hozumi
- Score: 7–6^{(9–7)}, 7–6^{(7–3)}

Details
- Draw: 15
- Seeds: 4

Events
Singles	Doubles
← 2022 ·	L'Open 35 de Saint-Malo	· 2024 →

Eri Hozumi and Makoto Ninomiya were the reigning champions. Hozumi partnered Ulrikke Eikeri, but lost in the final to Greet Minnen and Bibiane Schoofs. Ninomiya chose to participate in Madrid instead.

Minnen and Schoofs won the title, defeating Eikeri and Hozumi in the final, 7–6^{(9–7)}, 7–6^{(7–3)}.

== Seeds ==
1. (Norway) Ulrikke Eikeri / (Japan) Eri Hozumi (final)
2. (Georgia (country)) Natela Dzalamidze / Angelina Gabueva (first round)
3. (Brazil) Ingrid Gamarra Martins / Iryna Shymanovich (semifinals)
4. (Belgium) Greet Minnen / (Netherlands) Bibiane Schoofs (champions)

== Draw ==
=== Key ===
- Q = Qualifier
- WC = Wild card
- LL = Lucky loser
- Alt = Alternate
- SE = Special exempt
- PR = Protected ranking
- ITF = ITF entry
- JE = Junior exempt
- w/o = Walkover
- r = Retired
- d = Defaulted
- SR = Special ranking

=== Draw ===
First round
(France) É Dartron (France) M Rouvroy	w/o
(France) C Burel (France) C Paquet
3	(Brazil) I Gamarra Martins; I Shymanovich	6	7^{7}
(France) E Jacquemot (France) L Jeanjean	1	6^{4}
(Germany) T Morderger (Germany) Y Morderger	1	3
(United Kingdom) F Christie (United Kingdom) A Collins	6	6
(Greece) D Papamichail (Spain) R Vicens Mas	6	2	[7]
(France) A Hesse (France) A Robbe	2	6	[10]
(Uzbekistan) N Abduraimova (United Kingdom) E Webley-Smith	1	6^{3}
4	(Belgium) G Minnen (Netherlands) B Schoofs	6	7^{7}
(France) E Lechemia (France) J Ponchet	2	2
(United Kingdom) J Burrage (United States) K Volynets	6	6
L Marozava (Brazil) L Pigossi	6	7^{7}
2	(Georgia (country)) N Dzalamidze; A Gabueva	2	6^{3}

Quarterfinals
1	(Norway) U Eikeri (Japan) E Hozumi	6	7
(France) É Dartron (France) M Rouvroy	1	5
3	(Brazil) I Gamarra Martins; I Shymanovich	6	6
(United Kingdom) F Christie (United Kingdom) A Collins	4	4
(France) A Hesse (France) A Robbe	2	3
4	(Belgium) G Minnen (Netherlands) B Schoofs	6	6
(United Kingdom) J Burrage (United States) K Volynets	4	3
L Marozava (Brazil) L Pigossi	6	6

Semifinals
1	(Norway) U Eikeri (Japan) E Hozumi	7^{7}	7
3	(Brazil) I Gamarra Martins; I Shymanovich	6^{5}	5
4	(Belgium) G Minnen (Netherlands) B Schoofs	6	5	[10]
L Marozava (Brazil) L Pigossi	2	7	[8]

Final
1	(Norway) U Eikeri (Japan) E Hozumi	6^{7}	6^{3}
4	(Belgium) G Minnen (Netherlands) B Schoofs	7^{9}	7^{7}
