= 2023 L'Open 35 de Saint-Malo – Singles =

Singles
- 2023 L'Open 35 de Saint-Malo

Final
- Champion: (United States) Sloane Stephens
- Runner-up: (Belgium) Greet Minnen
- Score: 6–3, 6–4

Details
- Draw: 32

Events
| Singles | Doubles |
- L'Open 35 de Saint-Malo

Beatriz Haddad Maia was the defending champion, but chose to participate in the Madrid Open, instead.

Sloane Stephens won the title, defeating Greet Minnen in the final, 6–3, 6–4. This was Stephens first WTA 125 title, despite having won titles in the main WTA Tour.

== Seeds ==
1. (United States) Sloane Stephens (champion)
2. (United States) Claire Liu (first round)
3. (Belgium) Maryna Zanevska (second round)
4. (Belgium) Ysaline Bonaventure (second round)
5. (Italy) Lucia Bronzetti (second round)
6. (Czech Republic) Tereza Martincová (first round, retired)
7. (Poland) Magdalena Fręch (quarterfinals)
8. (United States) Emma Navarro (quarterfinals)

== Draw ==
Key

- Q = Qualifier
- WC = Wild card
- LL = Lucky loser
- Alt = Alternate
- ITF = ITF entry
- PR = Protected ranking
- SR = Special ranking
- SE = Special exempt
- JE = Junior exempt
- JR = Junior Accelerator Programme entrant
- CO = College Accelerator Programme entrant
- NG = Next Gen Accelerator Program entrant
- w/o = Walkover
- r = Retired
- d = Defaulted

=== Finals ===
Semifinals
1/WC | (United States) Sloane Stephens | 7 | 7^{7}
WC | (Ukraine) Elina Svitolina | 5 | 6^{5}
(United States) Katie Volynets | 3 | 3
(Belgium) Greet Minnen | 6 | 6

Final
1/WC | (United States) Sloane Stephens | 6 | 6
(Belgium) Greet Minnen | 3 | 4

=== Top half ===
First round
1/WC | (United States) S Stephens | 6 | 6
Q | (France) É Dartron | 1 | 1
(United Kingdom) K Swan | 6 | 5 | 3
LL | (United Kingdom) F Christie | 2 | 7 | 6
(Spain) R Vicens Mas | 4 | 4
(France) J Ponchet | 6 | 6
(France) D Parry | 6 | 3
6 | (Czech Republic) T Martincová | 4 | 0^{r}
4 | (Belgium) Y Bonaventure | 6 | 6
WC | (France) S Janicijevic | 4 | 4
WC | (Ukraine) E Svitolina | 7 | 6
(Greece) D Papamichail | 5 | 1
(France) L Jeanjean | 7 | 6
Q | (France) A Robbe | 5 | 4
Q | I Shymanovich | 0 | 2
5 | (Italy) L Bronzetti | 6 | 6

Second round
1/WC | (United States) S Stephens | 6 | 6
LL | (United Kingdom) F Christie | 1 | 1
(France) J Ponchet | 6 | 6
(France) D Parry | 3 | 4
4 | (Belgium) Y Bonaventure | 6 | 4 | 6^{5}
WC | (Ukraine) E Svitolina | 2 | 6 | 7^{7}
(France) L Jeanjean | 6 | 6
5 | (Italy) L Bronzetti | 3 | 1

Quarterfinals
1/WC | (United States) S Stephens | 6 | 2 | 6
(France) J Ponchet | 2 | 6 | 1
WC | (Ukraine) E Svitolina | 6 | 6
(France) L Jeanjean | 3 | 1

Semifinals
1/WC | (United States) S Stephens | 7 | 7^{7}
WC | (Ukraine) E Svitolina | 5 | 6^{5}

=== Bottom half ===
First round
7 | (Poland) M Fręch | 6 | 6
(France) C Paquet | 1 | 3
(Uzbekistan) N Abduraimova | 3 | 1
(France) E Jacquemot | 6 | 6
(United States) K Volynets | 7 | 6
WC | (France) M Rouvroy | 5 | 2
(Brazil) L Pigossi | 2 | 0
3 | (Belgium) M Zanevska | 6 | 6
8 | (United States) E Navarro | 7^{7} | 7
(Croatia) A Konjuh | 6^{4} | 5
(Italy) L Stefanini | 3 | 6 | 2
PR | (France) A Hesse | 6 | 4 | 6
Q | (France) C Monnet | 6 | 2 | 5
(United Kingdom) J Burrage | 2 | 6 | 7
(Belgium) G Minnen | 2 | 6 | 6
2 | (United States) C Liu | 6 | 2 | 4

Second round
7 | (Poland) M Fręch | 6 | 6
(France) E Jacquemot | 2 | 3
(United States) K Volynets | 2 | 6 | 7
3 | (Belgium) M Zanevska | 6 | 4 | 5
8 | (United States) E Navarro | 6 | 6
PR | (France) A Hesse | 1 | 0
(United Kingdom) J Burrage | 4 | 3
(Belgium) G Minnen | 6 | 6

Quarterfinals
7 | (Poland) M Fręch | 3 | 3
(United States) K Volynets | 6 | 6
8 | (United States) E Navarro | 6 | 3 | 3
(Belgium) G Minnen | 3 | 6 | 6

Semifinals
(United States) K Volynets | 3 | 3
(Belgium) G Minnen | 6 | 6

== Qualifying ==
=== Seeds ===
1. (France) Carole Monnet (qualified)
2. Iryna Shymanovich (qualified)
3. (France) Alice Robbe (qualified)
4. (France) Émeline Dartron (qualified)
5. (United Kingdom) Freya Christie (qualifying competition, lucky loser)
6. (Germany) Yana Morderger (qualifying competition)
7. (United States) Amy Zhu (qualifying competition)
8. (Germany) Tayisiya Morderger (first round)

=== Qualifiers ===
1. (France) Carole Monnet
2. Iryna Shymanovich
3. (France) Alice Robbe
4. (France) Émeline Dartron

=== Lucky loser ===
1. (United Kingdom) Freya Christie

=== Draw ===
==== First qualifier ====
| First round | Qualifying competition |
| | 1 | (France) Carole Monnet | 6 | 6 |
| | 5 | (United Kingdom) Freya Christie | 3 | 2 |

==== Second qualifier ====
| First round | | | | | Qualifying competition |
| | | | | | 2 | Iryna Shymanovich | 6 | 6 |
| | | | | | 6 | (Germany) Yana Morderger | 1 | 4 |
| | (Netherlands) Bibiane Schoofs | 6 | 2 | 4 | 6 | (Germany) Yana Morderger | 1 | 4 |
| 6 | (Germany) Yana Morderger | 1 | 6 | 6 |

==== Third qualifier ====
| First round | | | | Qualifying competition |
| | | | | 3 | (France) Alice Robbe | 7 | 3 | 6 |
| | | | | 7 | (United States) Amy Zhu | 5 | 6 | 4 |
| | (United Kingdom) Emily Webley-Smith | 1 | 2 | 7 | (United States) Amy Zhu | 5 | 6 | 4 |
| 7 | (United States) Amy Zhu | 6 | 6 |

==== Fourth qualifier ====
| First round | | | | | Qualifying competition |
| | | | | | 4 | (France) Émeline Dartron | 4 | 6 | 6 |
| | | | | | | (Norway) Ulrikke Eikeri | 6 | 2 | 1 |
| | (Norway) Ulrikke Eikeri | 6 | 6^{5} | 6 | | (Norway) Ulrikke Eikeri | 6 | 2 | 1 |
| 8 | (Germany) Tayisiya Morderger | 2 | 7^{7} | 4 |
