= 2019 Koser Jewelers Tennis Challenge =

- Date: 5–11 August 2019
- Edition: 13th
- Category: ITF Women's World Tennis Tour
- Prize money: $60,000
- Surface: Hard
- Location: Landisville, Pennsylvania, United States

Champions

Singles
- (United States) Madison Brengle

Doubles
- (United States) Vania King / (United States) Claire Liu
← 2018 ·	Koser Jewelers Tennis Challenge	· 2021 →

The 2019 Koser Jewelers Tennis Challenge was a professional tennis tournament played on outdoor hard courts. It was the thirteenth edition of the tournament which was part of the 2019 ITF Women's World Tennis Tour. It took place in Landisville, Pennsylvania, United States between 5 and 11 August 2019.

== Singles main-draw entrants ==
=== Seeds ===
Country	Player	Rank^{1}	Seed
USA	Madison Brengle	78	1
CHN	Zhu Lin	125	2
UKR	Katarina Zavatska	134	3
GBR	Harriet Dart	139	4
BEL	Yanina Wickmayer	157	5
ARG	Paula Ormaechea	158	6
~~USA~~	~~Robin Anderson~~	~~162~~	~~7~~
AUS	Ellen Perez	163	8

- ^{1} Rankings are as of 29 July 2019.

=== Other entrants ===
The following players received wildcards into the singles main draw:

- (United States) Katharine Fahey
- (United States) Raveena Kingsley
- (United States) Jamie Loeb
- (United States) Sophia Whittle

The following player received entry as a special exempt:

- (United States) Catherine Harrison

The following players received entry from the qualifying draw:

- (Australia) Alison Bai
- (United States) Elysia Bolton
- (Australia) Lizette Cabrera
- (United States) Victoria Duval
- (Russia) Angelina Gabueva
- (United States) Claire Liu
- (United States) Maria Sanchez
- (China) You Xiaodi

The following players received entry as lucky losers:

- (Japan) Ayaka Okuno
- (Sweden) Julia Rosenqvist

== Champions ==
=== Singles ===
- (United States) Madison Brengle def. (China) Zhu Lin, 6–4, 7–5

=== Doubles ===
- (United States) Vania King / (United States) Claire Liu def. (United States) Hayley Carter / (United States) Jamie Loeb, 4–6, 6–2, [10–5]
