= Greet Minnen =

Belgian tennis player (born 1997)

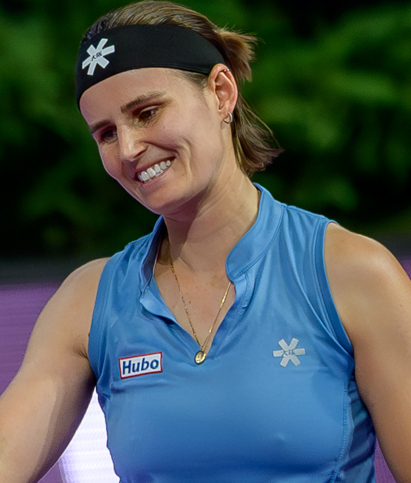
- Minnen at the 2026 Transylvania Open
- Country (sports): Belgium
- Born: 14 August 1997 (age 29) Turnhout, Belgium
- Height: 1.75 m (5 ft 9 in)
- Plays: Right (two-handed backhand)
- Prize money: $3,461,222

Singles
- Career record: 409–242
- Career titles: 1 WTA Challenger
- Highest ranking: No. 59 (16 October 2023)
- Current ranking: No. 176 (24 August 2026)

Grand Slam singles results
- Australian Open: 2R (2020)
- French Open: 1R (2020, 2021, 2022, 2024, 2025)
- Wimbledon: 2R (2022, 2024)
- US Open: 3R (2021, 2023)

Doubles
- Career record: 110–94
- Career titles: 2 WTA Tour, 2 WTA Challengers
- Highest ranking: No. 45 (8 January 2024)
- Current ranking: No. 934 (24 August 2026)

Grand Slam doubles results
- Australian Open: 2R (2022, 2023)
- French Open: QF (2022, 2023)
- Wimbledon: 3R (2023)
- US Open: 3R (2021)

Team competitions
- BJK Cup: 8–4
- Last updated on: 26 August 2026.

Greet Minnen (born 14 August 1997) is a Belgian tennis player. Minnen has career-high WTA rankings of No. 59 in singles and No. 45 in doubles, achieved on 16 October 2023 and 8 January 2024, respectively.

== Career ==
=== Juniors ===
In her last year as a junior, Minnen reached the girls' doubles final of the 2015 Australian Open, losing in two sets.

=== 2018-2022: WTA Tour and major debuts ===
Minnen made her WTA Tour main-draw debut at the 2018 Luxembourg Open in doubles, partnering Alison Van Uytvanck. They won the title, defeating Vera Lapko and Mandy Minella in the final, in two sets. In May 2021, again partnering Van Uytvanck, they lost in a second WTA Tour doubles final to Aleksandra Krunić and Nina Stojanović in Belgrade.

In September 2021, she reached the third round at the 2021 US Open as a lucky loser defeating Nadia Podoroska and Liudmila Samsonova. Next, she won the 2021 Luxembourg Open, her second tour doubles title, also partnering Van Uytvanck.

At the 2022 French Open, she reached the quarterfinals in doubles partnering with Anna Bondár. In the first round of the 2022 Wimbledon Championships, she beat former Wimbledon champion and former world No. 1, Garbiñe Muguruza, 6–4, 6–0, and scored the first top-10 win of her career.

=== 2023: US Open second third round, top 60 ===
Partnering with Bibiane Schoofs, Minnen won the doubles title at the WTA 125 2023 L'Open 35 de Saint-Malo, defeating Eri Hozumi and Makoto Ninomiya in the final. At the 2023 French Open, she reached consecutive quarterfinals in doubles, partnering with Anna Bondár.

Minnen reached the third round for the second time at the US Open, as a qualifier, defeating wildcard Venus Williams en route, 6–1, 6–1 in 73 minutes, and Sachia Vickery, climbing 29 spots to world No. 69 on 11 September 2023 and to a new career-high in singles of No. 59 a month later, on 16 October 2023.

=== 2024: WTA 1000 first wins and two third rounds ===
At the WTA 1000 Qatar Open, she recorded her first win at this level over Tatjana Maria. At the next WTA 1000, the 2024 Miami Open, she replaced 18th seed Barbora Krejčíková as a lucky loser directly into the second round and defeated Lesia Tsurenko to reach the third round for the first time at this level in her career.

At the WTA 1000 2024 China Open, she again reached the third round for the second time in the season and in her career at this level, with wins over two Russians Erika Andreeva and 28th seed Anastasia Potapova, notching the tenth top-50 win of her career -- six of which came in 2024.

=== 2025: First WTA 125 title ===
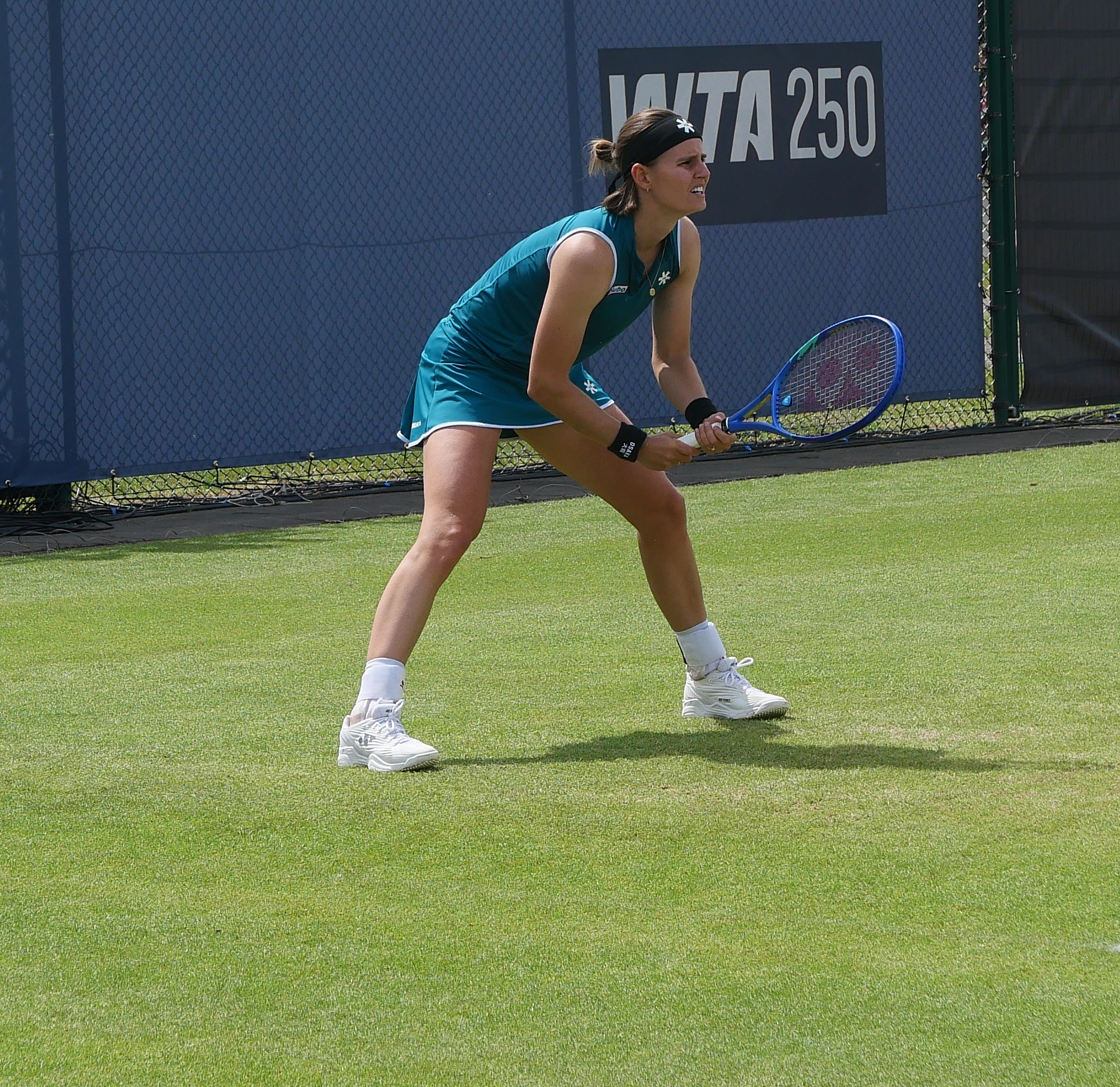
Minnen at the 2026 Rosmalen Open

In February, Minnen reached the semifinals at the ATX Open with wins over qualifier Wei Sijia, eighth seed Suzan Lamens and Caroline Dolehide, before losing in the last four to fifth seed McCartney Kessler.

She won her first WTA 125 title at the Birmingham Open in June, defeating Linda Fruhvirtová in the final.

== Personal life ==
Minnen was in a relationship with Belgian tennis player Alison Van Uytvanck. She married Marie Diels in July 2025.

== Performance timelines ==
Key
W	F	SF	QF	#R	RR	Q#	DNQ	A	NH

(W) winner; (F) finalist; (SF) semifinalist; (QF) quarterfinalist; (#R) rounds 4, 3, 2, 1; (RR) round-robin stage; (Q#) qualification round; (DNQ) did not qualify; (A) absent; (NH) not held; (SR) strike rate (events won / competed); (W–L) win–loss record.
To avoid confusion and double counting, these charts are updated at the conclusion of a tournament or when the player's participation has ended.

Only main-draw results in WTA Tour, Grand Slam tournaments, Billie Jean King Cup, United Cup, Hopman Cup and Olympic Games are included in win–loss records.

=== Singles ===
Current through the 2026 US Open.

Tournament	2019	2020	2021	2022	2023	2024	2025	2026	SR	W–L	Win%
Grand Slam tournaments
Australian Open	A	2R	1R	1R	Q1	1R	1R	Q3	0 / 5	1–5	17%
French Open	Q3	1R	1R	1R	Q3	1R	1R	Q3	0 / 5	0–5	0%
Wimbledon	Q3	NH	1R	2R	1R	2R	A	Q2	0 / 4	2–4	33%
US Open	Q1	1R	3R	1R	3R	2R	1R	Q1	0 / 6	5–6	45%
Win–loss	0–0	1–3	2–4	1–4	2–2	2–4	0–3	0–0	0 / 20	8–20	29%
National representation
Billie Jean King Cup (Note: Formerly known as Fed Cup until 2020.)	A	RR (Note: Edition is split into the two years due to COVID-19.)		A	QR	A	Z1		0 / 1	5–1	83%
WTA 1000
Qatar Open (Note: The first Premier 5 event of the year has switched back and forth between the Dubai Tennis Championships and the Qatar Ladies Open since 2009 until 2024. Dubai was classified as a Premier 5 event from 2009 to 2011 before being succeeded by Doha for the 2012–2014 period. In 2015, Dubai regained its Premier 5 status while Doha was demoted to Premier status. The Premier 5 tournaments were reclassified as WTA 1000 tournaments in 2021.)	A	Q2	A	A	A	2R	1R	A	0 / 2	1–2	33%
Dubai	A	A	A	A	A	Q1	A	A	0 / 0	0–0	–
Indian Wells Open	A	NH	A	Q1	A	1R	Q2	A	0 / 1	0–1	0%
Miami Open	A	NH	Q2	1R	A	3R	1R	A	0 / 3	2–3	40%
Madrid Open	A	NH	A	1R	A	1R	A	A	0 / 2	0–2	0%
Italian Open	A	A	A	A	A	1R	A	A	0 / 1	0–1	0%
Canadian Open	A	NH	A	A	A	2R	A	A	0 / 1	1–1	50%
Cincinnati Open	A	Q1	A	A	A	A	1R	A	0 / 1	0–1	0%
Wuhan Open	A	NH				Q1	A		0 / 0	0–0	–
China Open	A	NH			A	3R	2R		0 / 1	3–2	60%
Win–loss	0–0	0–0	0–0	0–2	0–0	6–7	1–4	0–0	0 / 13	7–13	35%
Career statistics
	2019	2020	2021	2022	2023	2024	2025	2026	SR	W–L	Win%
Tournaments	6	8	13	12	5	20	6	0	Career total: 70		
Titles	0	0	0	0	0	0	0	0	Career total: 0		
Finals	0	0	0	0	0	0	0	0	Career total: 0		
Overall win–loss	6–6	2–8	13–14	2–12	7–5	12–20	5–6	0–0	0 / 64	47–71	40%
Year-end ranking (Note: 2013: WTA ranking–932, 2014: WTA ranking–n/a, 2015: WTA ranking–457, 2016: WTA ranking–323, 2017: WTA ranking–828, 2018: WTA ranking–316.)	123	110	75	202	62	96	122		$2,019,753		

=== Doubles ===
Current through the 2024 Wimbledon Championships.

Tournament	2018	2019	2020	2021	2022	2023	2024	SR	W–L	Win%
Grand Slam tournaments
Australian Open	A	A	1R	A	2R	2R	1R	0 / 4	2–4	33%
French Open	A	A	2R	1R	QF	QF	1R	0 / 5	6–5	55%
Wimbledon	A	2R	NH	2R	1R	3R	1R	0 / 5	4–5	44%
US Open	A	A	A	3R	2R	2R	A	0 / 3	4–3	57%
Win–loss	0–0	1–1	1–2	3–3	4–4	7–4	0–3	0 / 17	16–17	48%
WTA 1000
Miami Open	A	A	NH	A	1R	A	A	0 / 1	0–1	0%
Career statistics
Tournaments	1	5	6	8	10			Career total: 30		
Titles	1	0	0	1	0			Career total: 2		
Finals	1	0	0	2	0			Career total: 3		
Overall win–loss	4–0	5–4	5–6	12–7	6–9			2 / 30	32–26	55%
Year-end ranking	221	171	108	91	65	59	161			

== WTA Tour finals ==
=== Doubles: 4 (2 titles, 2 runner-ups) ===
Legend WTA 500 (0–1) WTA 250 (2–1)	Finals by surface Hard (2–1) Clay (0–1)

Result	W–L	Date	Tournament	Tier	Surface	Partner	Opponents	Score
Win	1–0	Oct 2018	Luxembourg Open, Luxembourg	International (Note: The WTA International tournaments were reclassified as WTA 250 tournaments in 2021.)	Hard (i)	(Belgium) Alison Van Uytvanck	(Belarus) Vera Lapko (Luxembourg) Mandy Minella	7–6^{(7–3)}, 6–2
Loss	1–1	May 2021	Serbia Open, Serbia	WTA 250	Clay	(Belgium) Alison Van Uytvanck	(Serbia) Aleksandra Krunić (Serbia) Nina Stojanović	0–6, 2–6
Win	2–1	Sep 2021	Luxembourg Open, Luxembourg (2)	WTA 250	Hard (i)	(Belgium) Alison Van Uytvanck	(New Zealand) Erin Routliffe (Belgium) Kimberley Zimmermann	6–3, 6–3
Loss	2–2	Jan 2024	Brisbane International, Australia	WTA 500	Hard	(United Kingdom) Heather Watson	(Ukraine) Lyudmyla Kichenok (Latvia) Jeļena Ostapenko	5–7, 2–6

== WTA 125 finals ==
=== Singles: 3 (1 title, 2 runner-ups) ===
Result	W–L	Date	Tournament	Surface	Opponent	Score
Loss	0–1	May 2023	Open de Saint-Malo, France	Clay	(United States) Sloane Stephens	3–6, 4–6
Loss	0–2	Aug 2023	Kozerki Open, Poland	Hard	(Ukraine) Dayana Yastremska	6–2, 1–6, 3–6
Win	1–2	Jun 2025	Birmingham Open, United Kingdom	Grass	(Czech Republic) Linda Fruhvirtová	6–2, 6–1

=== Doubles: 2 (2 titles) ===
Result	W–L	Date	Tournament	Surface	Partner	Opponents	Score
Win	1–0	Dec 2021	Open Angers, France	Hard (i)	(Slovakia) Tereza Mihalíková	(Romania) Monica Niculescu (Russia) Vera Zvonareva	4–6, 6–1, [10–8]
Win	2–0	May 2023	Open de Saint-Malo, France	Clay	(Netherlands) Bibiane Schoofs	(Norway) Ulrikke Eikeri (Japan) Eri Hozumi	7–6^{(9–7)}, 7–6^{(7–3)}

== ITF Circuit finals ==
=== Singles: 25 (12 titles, 13 runner-ups) ===
Legend
W100 tournaments (0–3)
W60/75 tournaments (3–3)
W40 tournaments (1–0)
W25 tournaments (1–2)
W10/15 tournaments (7–5)

Result	W–L	Date	Tournament	Tier	Surface	Opponent	Score
Loss	0–1	Jul 2013	ITF Maaseik, Belgium	10,000	Clay	(France) Manon Arcangioli	2–6, 6–3, 5–7
Loss	0–2	Jul 2015	ITF Nieuwpoort, Belgium	10,000	Clay	(Belgium) Sofie Oyen	2–6, 1–6
Win	1–2	Sep 2015	ITF Pétange, Luxembourg	10,000	Hard (i)	(Slovakia) Michaela Hončová	6–0, 3–6, 6–3
Win	2–2	Oct 2015	ITF Antalya, Turkey	10,000	Hard	(Romania) Daiana Negreanu	6–3, 3–0 ret.
Loss	2–3	Oct 2015	ITF Antalya, Turkey	10,000	Hard	(Hungary) Anna Bondár	6–3, 2–6, 1–6
Loss	2–4	Jun 2016	ITF Sharm El Sheikh, Egypt	10,000	Hard	(China) Zhao Xiaoxi	6–7^{(6)}, 2–6
Win	3–4	July 2016	ITF Sharm El Sheikh, Egypt	10,000	Hard	(Romania) Ioana Pietroiu	7–6^{(2)}, 6–2
Loss	3–5	Aug 2016	ITF Tsukuba, Japan	25,000	Hard	(Thailand) Peangtarn Plipuech	4–6, 0–6
Win	4–5	Mar 2018	ITF Solarino, Italy	15,000	Carpet	(United States) Quinn Gleason	2–6, 6–2, 6–4
Win	5–5	May 2018	ITF Antalya, Turkey	15,000	Clay	(Bulgaria) Julia Stamatova	6–0, 6–1
Loss	5–6	Jul 2018	ITF Alkmaar, Netherlands	15,000	Clay	(Sweden) Marina Yudanov	0–6, 2–6
Win	6–6	Aug 2018	ITF Oldenzaal, Netherlands	15,000	Clay	(Netherlands) Arianne Hartono	6–2, 6–2
Win	7–6	Sep 2018	ITF Santarém, Portugal	15,000	Hard	(United Kingdom) Samantha Murray	7–5, 6–3
Loss	7–7	Sep 2018	ITF Óbidos, Portugal	25,000	Carpet	(Italy) Giulia Gatto-Monticone	5–7, 4–6
Win	8–7	Mar 2019	Yokohama Challenger, Japan	W25	Hard	(Romania) Elena-Gabriela Ruse	6–4, 6–1
Loss	8–8	Aug 2021	Landisville Tennis Challenge, US	W100	Hard	(Spain) Nuria Párrizas Díaz	6–7^{(6)}, 6–4, 6–7^{(7)}
Win	9–8	Feb 2022	AK Ladies Open, Germany	W60	Carpet (i)	(Ukraine) Daria Snigur	6–4, 6–3
Loss	9–9	Feb 2022	Nur-Sultan Challenger, Kazakhstan	W60	Hard (i)	(Russia) Anzhelika Isaeva	4–6, 0–0 ret.
Win	10–9	Jan 2023	GB Pro-Series Sunderland, UK	W60	Hard (i)	(Germany) Mona Barthel	6–2, 1–6, 6–0
Win	11–9	Feb 2023	Porto Indoor, Portugal	W40	Hard (i)	(Croatia) Tara Würth	6–2, 6–2
Loss	11–10	Feb 2023	AK Ladies Open, Germany	W60	Carpet (i)	(Denmark) Clara Tauson	6–7^{(5)}, 6–4, 2–6
Loss	11–11	May 2023	Empire Slovak Open, Slovakia	W100	Clay	(Belgium) Yanina Wickmayer	0–6, 3–6
Loss	11–12	Apr 2025	Oeiras CETO Open, Portugal	W100	Clay	(China) Yuan Yue	6–4, 4–6, 2–6
Win	12–12	Sep 2025	Le Neubourg Open, France	W75	Hard	(Croatia) Petra Marčinko	6–2, 6–1
Loss	12–13	Mar 2026	ITF Murska Sobota, Slovenia	W75	Hard (i)	(Ukraine) Daria Snigur	3–6, 2–6

=== Doubles: 4 (3 titles, 1 runner-up) ===
Legend
W60 tournaments (3–0)
W10 tournaments (0–1)

Result	W–L	Date	Tournament	Tier	Surface	Partner	Opponents	Score
Loss	0–1	Jun 2016	ITF Sharm El Sheikh, Egypt	10k	Hard	(Canada) Petra Januskova	(Romania) Ana Bianca Mihăilă (China) Zhao Xiaoxi	6–2, 4–6, [7–10]
Win	1–1	Feb 2023	AK Ladies Open, Germany	W60	Carpet (i)	(Belgium) Yanina Wickmayer	(United Kingdom) Freya Christie (United Kingdom) Ali Collins	6–1, 6–3
Win	2–1	Mar 2023	Trnava Indoor, Slovakia	W60	Hard (i)	(Belgium) Yanina Wickmayer	(Greece) Sapfo Sakellaridi (Slovakia) Radka Zelníčková	6–4, 6–4
Win	3–1	Apr 2023	Open de Seine-et-Marne, France	W60	Hard (i)	(Belgium) Yanina Wickmayer	(United Kingdom) Jodie Burrage (Turkey) Berfu Cengiz	6–4, 6–4

== Junior Grand Slam tournament finals ==
=== Doubles: 1 (runner-up) ===
Result	Year	Tournament	Surface	Partner	Opponents	Score
Loss	2015	Australian Open	Hard	(Germany) Katharina Hobgarski	(Czech Republic) Miriam Kolodziejová (Czech Republic) Markéta Vondroušová	5–7, 4–6

== Head-to-head record ==
=== Top 10 wins ===
Season	2022	2026	Total
Wins	1	1	2

#	Player	Rank	Event	Surface	Rd	Score	GMR
2022
1.	(Spain) Garbiñe Muguruza	No. 10	Wimbledon, UK	Grass	1R	6–4, 6–0	No. 88
2026
2.	(Ukraine) Elina Svitolina	No. 7	Billie Jean King Cup finals, China	Hard (i)	QF	6–7^{(5–7)}, 6–4, 6–4	No. 217
