= 2023 WTA 1000 tournaments =

Women's professional tennis tour

2023 WTA 1000
Details
- Duration: February 20 – October 9
- Edition: 34th
- Tournaments: 9

Achievements (singles)
- Most titles: (Kazakhstan) Elena Rybakina (2)
- Most finals: (Kazakhstan) Elena Rybakina (Poland) Iga Świątek (3)

The WTA 1000 Mandatory and non-Mandatory tournaments, which are part of the WTA 1000 tournaments, make up the elite tour for professional women's tennis organised by the WTA called the WTA Tour. There are four 1000 Mandatory tournaments: Indian Wells, Miami, Madrid and Beijing and five non-Mandatory tournaments: Dubai, Rome, Canada, Cincinnati and Guadalajara, the last of which continuing from the previous year as the replacement for the Wuhan Open.

== Tournaments ==
Tournament	Country	Location	Surface	Date	Prize money
Dubai Tennis Championships	United Arab Emirates	Dubai	Hard	February 20 – 26	$2,788,468
Indian Wells Masters	United States	Indian Wells	Hard	Mar 6 – 19	$8,800,000
Miami Open	United States	Miami	Hard	Mar 20 – Apr 2	$8,800,000
Madrid Open	Spain	Madrid	Clay (red)	Apr 24 – May 1	$7,652,174
Italian Open	Italy	Rome	Clay (red)	May 8 – May 15	$3,572,618
Canadian Open	Canada	Montreal	Hard	Aug 7 – 13	$2,788,468
Cincinnati Masters	United States	Mason	Hard	Aug 14 – 20	$2,788,468
Guadalajara Open	Mexico	Guadalajara	Hard	Sep 15 – Sep 22	$2,788,468
China Open	China	Beijing	Hard	Oct 2 – Oct 9	$8,127,389

== Results ==
* First-time champion

Tournament	Singles champions	Runners-up	Score	Doubles champions	Runners-up	Score
Dubai Singles – Doubles	(Czech Republic) Barbora Krejčíková*	(Poland) Iga Świątek	6–4, 6–2	Veronika Kudermetova	(Chinese Taipei) Chan Hao-ching (Chinese Taipei) Latisha Chan	6–4, 6–7^{(4–7)}, [10–1]
Dubai Singles – Doubles	(Czech Republic) Barbora Krejčíková*	(Poland) Iga Świątek	6–4, 6–2	Liudmila Samsonova*	(Chinese Taipei) Chan Hao-ching (Chinese Taipei) Latisha Chan	6–4, 6–7^{(4–7)}, [10–1]
Indian Wells Singles – Doubles	(Kazakhstan) Elena Rybakina*	Aryna Sabalenka	7–6^{(13–11)}, 6–4	(Czech Republic) Barbora Krejčíková (Czech Republic) Kateřina Siniaková	(Brazil) Beatriz Haddad Maia (Germany) Laura Siegemund	6–1, 6–7^{(3–7)}, [10–7]
Miami Singles – Doubles	(Czech Republic) Petra Kvitová	(Kazakhstan) Elena Rybakina	7–6^{(16–14)}, 6–2	(United States) Coco Gauff (United States) Jessica Pegula	(Canada) Leylah Fernandez (United States) Taylor Townsend	7–6^{(8–6)}, 6–2
Madrid Singles – Doubles	Aryna Sabalenka	(Poland) Iga Świątek	6–3, 3–6, 6–3	Victoria Azarenka	(United States) Coco Gauff (United States) Jessica Pegula	6–1, 6–4
Madrid Singles – Doubles	Aryna Sabalenka	(Poland) Iga Świątek	6–3, 3–6, 6–3	(Brazil) Beatriz Haddad Maia*	(United States) Coco Gauff (United States) Jessica Pegula	6–1, 6–4
Rome Singles – Doubles	(Kazakhstan) Elena Rybakina (2)	(Ukraine) Anhelina Kalinina	6–4, 1–0, ret.	(Australia) Storm Hunter (Belgium) Elise Mertens	(United States) Coco Gauff (United States) Jessica Pegula	6–4, 6–4
Montréal Singles – Doubles	(United States) Jessica Pegula	Liudmila Samsonova	6–1, 6–0	(Japan) Shuko Aoyama (Japan) Ena Shibahara	(United States) Desirae Krawczyk (Netherlands) Demi Schuurs	6–4, 4–6, [13–11]
Cincinnati Singles – Doubles	(United States) Coco Gauff*	(Czech Republic) Karolína Muchová	6–3, 6–4	(United States) Alycia Parks* (United States) Taylor Townsend*	(United States) Nicole Melichar-Martinez (Australia) Ellen Perez	6–7^{(1–7)}, 6–4, [10–6]
Guadalajara Singles – Doubles	(Greece) Maria Sakkari*	(United States) Caroline Dolehide	7–5, 6–1	(Australia) Storm Hunter (2) (Belgium) Elise Mertens (2)	(Canada) Gabriela Dabrowski (New Zealand) Erin Routliffe	3–6, 6–2, [10–4]
Beijing Singles – Doubles	(Poland) Iga Świątek	Liudmila Samsonova	6–2, 6–2	(Czech Republic) Marie Bouzková* (Spain) Sara Sorribes Tormo*	(Chinese Taipei) Chan Hao-ching (Mexico) Giuliana Olmos	3–6, 6–0, [10–4]

== Tournament details ==
Key

- Q = Qualifier
- WC = Wild card
- LL = Lucky loser
- Alt = Alternate
- ITF = ITF entry
- PR = Protected ranking
- SR = Special ranking
- SE = Special exempt
- JE = Junior exempt
- JR = Junior Accelerator Programme entrant
- CO = College Accelerator Programme entrant
- NG = Next Gen Accelerator Program entrant
- w/o = Walkover
- r = Retired
- d = Defaulted

=== Dubai ===
==== Singles ====
Quarterfinals
1	(Poland) Iga Świątek	w/o
(Czech Republic) Karolína Plíšková
(United States) Madison Keys	2	5
5	(United States) Coco Gauff	6	7
PR	(Czech Republic) Karolína Muchová
3	(United States) Jessica Pegula	w/o
(Czech Republic) Barbora Krejčíková	0	7^{7}	6
2	(Belarus) Aryna Sabalenka	6	6^{2}	1

Semifinals
1	(Poland) Iga Świątek	6	6
5	(United States) Coco Gauff	4	2
3	(United States) Jessica Pegula	1	7	0
(Czech Republic) Barbora Krejčíková	6	5	6

Final
1	(Poland) Iga Świątek	4	2
(Czech Republic) Barbora Krejčíková	6	6

==== Doubles ====
Semifinals
(Chinese Taipei) Chan Hao-ching (Chinese Taipei) Latisha Chan	6	4	[10]
3	(United States) Desirae Krawczyk (Netherlands) Demi Schuurs	1	6	[4]
Veronika Kudermetova; Liudmila Samsonova	7	6
2	(Ukraine) Lyudmyla Kichenok (Latvia) Jeļena Ostapenko	5	2

Final
(Chinese Taipei) Chan Hao-ching (Chinese Taipei) Latisha Chan	4	7^{7}	[1]
Veronika Kudermetova; Liudmila Samsonova	6	6^{4}	[10]

=== Indian Wells ===
==== Singles ====
Quarterfinals
1	(Poland) Iga Świątek	6	6
(Romania) Sorana Cîrstea	2	3
PR	(Czech Republic) Karolína Muchová	6^{4}	6	4
10	(Kazakhstan) Elena Rybakina	7^{7}	2	6
7	(Greece) Maria Sakkari	4	7	6
15	(Czech Republic) Petra Kvitová	6	5	1
6	(United States) Coco Gauff	4	0
2	(Belarus) Aryna Sabalenka	6	6

Semifinals
1	(Poland) Iga Świątek	2	2
10	(Kazakhstan) Elena Rybakina	6	6
7	(Greece) Maria Sakkari	2	3
2	(Belarus) Aryna Sabalenka	6	6

Final
10	(Kazakhstan) Elena Rybakina	7^{13}	6
2	(Belarus) Aryna Sabalenka	6^{11}	4

==== Doubles ====
Semifinals
1	(Czech Republic) Barbora Krejčíková (Czech Republic) Kateřina Siniaková	6	6
(Japan) Shuko Aoyama (Japan) Ena Shibahara	4	2
(Brazil) Beatriz Haddad Maia (Germany) Laura Siegemund	6	6
(Japan) Miyu Kato (Indonesia) Aldila Sutjiadi	1	2

Final
1	(Czech Republic) Barbora Krejčíková (Czech Republic) Kateřina Siniaková	6	6^{3}	[10]
(Brazil) Beatriz Haddad Maia (Germany) Laura Siegemund	1	7^{7}	[7]

=== Miami ===
==== Singles ====
Quarterfinals
25	(Italy) Martina Trevisan	3	0
10	(Kazakhstan) Elena Rybakina	6	6
3	(United States) Jessica Pegula	4	6	7^{7}
27	(Russia) Anastasia Potapova	6	3	6^{2}
18	Ekaterina Alexandrova	4	6	3
15	(Czech Republic) Petra Kvitová	6	3	6
(Romania) Sorana Cîrstea	6	6
2	(Belarus) Aryna Sabalenka	4	4

Semifinals
10	(Kazakhstan) Elena Rybakina	7^{7}	6
3	(United States) Jessica Pegula	6^{3}	4
15	(Czech Republic) Petra Kvitová	7	6
(Romania) Sorana Cîrstea	5	4

Final
10	(Kazakhstan) Elena Rybakina	6^{14}	2
15	(Czech Republic) Petra Kvitová	7^{16}	6

==== Doubles ====
Semifinals
(Poland) Magda Linette (United States) Bernarda Pera	6	2	[12]
(Canada) Leylah Fernandez (United States) Taylor Townsend	1	6	[14]
8	(United States) Nicole Melichar-Martinez (Australia) Ellen Perez	6^{5}	6^{4}
2	(United States) Coco Gauff (United States) Jessica Pegula	7^{7}	7^{7}

Final
(Canada) Leylah Fernandez (United States) Taylor Townsend	6^{6}	2
2	(United States) Coco Gauff (United States) Jessica Pegula	7^{8}	6

=== Madrid ===
==== Singles ====
Quarterfinals
1	(Poland) Iga Świątek	6	6
27	(Croatia) Petra Martić	0	3
3	(United States) Jessica Pegula	4	6	4
12	(Russia) Veronika Kudermetova	6	0	6
9	(Greece) Maria Sakkari	6^{3}	6	6
31	(Romania) Irina-Camelia Begu	7^{7}	4	2
(Egypt) Mayar Sherif	6	2	1
2	Aryna Sabalenka	2	6	6

Semifinals
1	(Poland) Iga Świątek	6	6
12	(Russia) Veronika Kudermetova	1	1
9	(Greece) Maria Sakkari	4	1
2	(Belarus) Aryna Sabalenka	6	6

Final
1	(Poland) Iga Świątek	3	6	3
2	(Belarus) Aryna Sabalenka	6	3	6

==== Doubles ====
Semifinals
1	(United States) Coco Gauff (United States) Jessica Pegula	7	7^{7}
Marta Kostyuk (Romania) Elena-Gabriela Ruse	5	6^{5}
(Belarus) Victoria Azarenka (Brazil) Beatriz Haddad Maia	6	0	[10]
(Canada) Leylah Fernandez (United States) Taylor Townsend	4	6	[6]

Final
1	(United States) Coco Gauff (United States) Jessica Pegula	1	4
(Belarus) Victoria Azarenka (Brazil) Beatriz Haddad Maia	6	6

=== Rome ===
==== Singles ====
Quarterfinals
1	(Poland) Iga Świątek	6	6^{3}	2^{r}
7	(Kazakhstan) Elena Rybakina	2	7^{7}	2
(Spain) Paula Badosa	2	6	3
20	(Latvia) Jeļena Ostapenko	6	4	6
11	(Russia) Veronika Kudermetova	3	6	6
22	(China) Zheng Qinwen	6	3	4
12	(Brazil) Beatriz Haddad Maia	7^{7}	6^{6}	3
30	(Ukraine) Anhelina Kalinina	6^{3}	7^{8}	6

Semifinals
7	(Kazakhstan) Elena Rybakina	6	6
20	(Latvia) Jeļena Ostapenko	2	4
11	(Russia) Veronika Kudermetova	5	7	2
30	(Ukraine) Anhelina Kalinina	7	5	6

Final
7	(Kazakhstan) Elena Rybakina	6	1
30	Anhelina Kalinina	4	0^{r}

==== Doubles ====
Semifinals
1	(United States) Coco Gauff (United States) Jessica Pegula	4	7^{7}	[10]
3	(United States) Desirae Krawczyk (Netherlands) Demi Schuurs	6	6^{5}	[8]
4	(Australia) Storm Hunter (Belgium) Elise Mertens	7	6
PR	(Czech Republic) Marie Bouzková (United States) Bethanie Mattek-Sands	5	4

Final
1	(United States) Coco Gauff (United States) Jessica Pegula	4	4
4	(Australia) Storm Hunter (Belgium) Elise Mertens	6	6

=== Montreal ===
==== Singles ====
Quarterfinals
1	(Poland) Iga Świątek	6	4	6
Q	(United States) Danielle Collins	3	6	2
4	(United States) Jessica Pegula	6	5	7
6	(United States) Coco Gauff	2	7	5
10	(Russia) Daria Kasatkina	7	5	6^{8}
3	(Kazakhstan) Elena Rybakina	5	7	7^{10}
12	(Switzerland) Belinda Bencic	4	4
15	(Russia) Liudmila Samsonova	6	6

Semifinals
1	(Poland) Iga Świątek	2	7^{7}	4
4	(United States) Jessica Pegula	6	6^{4}	6
3	(Kazakhstan) Elena Rybakina	6	1	2
15	(Russia) Liudmila Samsonova	1	6	6

Final
4	(United States) Jessica Pegula	6	6
15	(Russia) Liudmila Samsonova	1	0

==== Doubles ====
Semifinals
7	(Japan) Shuko Aoyama (Japan) Ena Shibahara	7^{7}	7^{7}
(Chinese Taipei) Latisha Chan (China) Yang Zhaoxuan	6^{4}	6^{2}
5	(United States) Desirae Krawczyk (Netherlands) Demi Schuurs	6	3	[11]
2	(Australia) Storm Hunter (Belgium) Elise Mertens	3	6	[9]

Final
7	(Japan) Shuko Aoyama (Japan) Ena Shibahara	6	4	[13]
5	(United States) Desirae Krawczyk (Netherlands) Demi Schuurs	4	6	[11]

=== Cincinnati ===
==== Singles ====
Quarterfinals
1	(Poland) Iga Świątek	7^{7}	6
10	(Czech Republic) Markéta Vondroušová	6^{3}	1
Q	(Italy) Jasmine Paolini	3	2
7	(United States) Coco Gauff	6	6
(Czech Republic) Karolína Muchová	3
(Czech Republic) Marie Bouzková	0^{r}
5	(Tunisia) Ons Jabeur	5	3
2	(Belarus) Aryna Sabalenka	7	6

Semifinals
1	(Poland) Iga Świątek	6^{2}	6	4
7	(United States) Coco Gauff	7^{7}	3	6
(Czech Republic) Karolína Muchová	6^{4}	6	6
2	(Belarus) Aryna Sabalenka	7^{7}	3	2

Final
7	(United States) Coco Gauff	6	6
(Czech Republic) Karolína Muchová	3	4

==== Doubles ====
Semifinals
7	(Chinese Taipei) Chan Hao-ching (Mexico) Giuliana Olmos	6	4	[5]
3	(United States) Nicole Melichar-Martinez (Australia) Ellen Perez	2	6	[10]
(United States) Alycia Parks (United States) Taylor Townsend	6	6
2	(Australia) Storm Hunter (Belgium) Elise Mertens	4	2

Final
3	(United States) Nicole Melichar-Martinez (Australia) Ellen Perez	7^{7}	4	[6]
(United States) Alycia Parks (United States) Taylor Townsend	6^{1}	6	[10]

=== Guadalajara ===
==== Singles ====
Quarterfinals
(Italy) Martina Trevisan	6	6^{9}	3
(United States) Caroline Dolehide	3	7^{11}	6
(Canada) Leylah Fernandez	4	7^{8}	1
(United States) Sofia Kenin	6	6^{6}	6
10	(Belarus) Victoria Azarenka	3	4
3	(France) Caroline Garcia	6	6
(Colombia) Emiliana Arango	3	4
2	(Greece) Maria Sakkari	6	6

Semifinals
(United States) Caroline Dolehide	7	6
(United States) Sofia Kenin	5	3
3	(France) Caroline Garcia	3	0
2	(Greece) Maria Sakkari	6	6

Final
(United States) Caroline Dolehide	5	3
2	(Greece) Maria Sakkari	7	6

==== Doubles ====
Semifinals
1	(Australia) Storm Hunter (Belgium) Elise Mertens	7	6
(United States) Caroline Dolehide (United States) Asia Muhammad	5	3
3	(Canada) Gabriela Dabrowski (New Zealand) Erin Routliffe	6	7^{7}
(Italy) Jasmine Paolini (Egypt) Mayar Sherif	2	6^{4}

Final
1	(Australia) Storm Hunter (Belgium) Elise Mertens	3	6	[10]
3	(Canada) Gabriela Dabrowski (New Zealand) Erin Routliffe	6	2	[4]

=== Beijing ===
==== Singles ====
Quarterfinals
1	Aryna Sabalenka	5	2
5	(Kazakhstan) Elena Rybakina	7	6
13	(Latvia) Jeļena Ostapenko	3	2
Liudmila Samsonova	6	6
6	(Greece) Maria Sakkari	2	4
3	(United States) Coco Gauff	6	6
9	(France) Caroline Garcia	7^{10}	6^{5}	1
2	(Poland) Iga Świątek	6^{8}	7^{7}	6

Semifinals
5	(Kazakhstan) Elena Rybakina	6^{7}	3
Liudmila Samsonova	7^{9}	6
3	(United States) Coco Gauff	2	3
2	(Poland) Iga Świątek	6	6

Final
Liudmila Samsonova	2	2
2	(Poland) Iga Świątek	6	6

==== Doubles ====
Semifinals
(Chinese Taipei) Chan Hao-ching (Mexico) Giuliana Olmos	7	6
(Poland) Magda Linette (United States) Peyton Stearns	5	4
(Czech Republic) Marie Bouzková (Spain) Sara Sorribes Tormo	6	6
(Brazil) Ingrid Gamarra Martins (Brazil) Luisa Stefani	2	2

Final
(Chinese Taipei) Chan Hao-ching (Mexico) Giuliana Olmos	6	0	[4]
(Czech Republic) Marie Bouzková (Spain) Sara Sorribes Tormo	3	6	[10]

== See also ==
- WTA 1000 tournaments
- 2023 WTA Tour
- 2023 ATP Tour Masters 1000
- 2023 ATP Tour
