= 2023 ATP Tour Masters 1000 =

Men's professional tennis tour

2023 ATP Masters 1000
Details
- Duration: March 8 – November 5
- Edition: 34th
- Tournaments: 9

Achievements (singles)
- Most titles: (Spain) Carlos Alcaraz (Serbia) Novak Djokovic Daniil Medvedev (2)
- Most finals: (Spain) Carlos Alcaraz; Daniil Medvedev (3)

The 2023 ATP Masters 1000 season is the thirty-fourth edition of the ATP 1000 Series tennis tournaments. The champion of each ATP 1000 event is awarded 1,000 rankings points.

Beginning this year, the ATP 1000 events in Madrid, Rome, and Shanghai were expanded to two weeks in duration with a 96-player draw for singles.

Russian and Belarus players competed under no nationality due to the Russian invasion of Ukraine.

== Tournaments ==
Tournament	Country	Location	Surface	Date	Prize money
Indian Wells Open	USA	Indian Wells, California	Hard	Mar 8 – 19	$8,800,000
Miami Open	USA	Hard Rock Stadium, Florida	Hard	Mar 22 – Apr 2	$8,800,000
Monte-Carlo Masters	France	Roquebrune-Cap-Martin	Clay	Apr 9 – 16	€5,779,335
Madrid Open	Spain	Madrid	Clay	Apr 26 – May 7	€7,705,780
Italian Open	Italy	Rome	Clay	May 10 – 21	€7,705,780
Canadian Open	Canada	Toronto	Hard	Aug 7 – 13	$6,600,000
Cincinnati Open	USA	Mason, Ohio	Hard	Aug 13 – 20	$6,600,000
Shanghai Masters	China	Shanghai	Hard	Oct 4 – 15	$8,800,000
Paris Masters	France	Paris	Hard (indoor)	Oct 30 – Nov 5	€5,779,335

== Results ==
* First-time champion

Masters	Singles champions	Runners-up	Score	Doubles champions	Runners-up	Score
Indian Wells Open Singles – Doubles	(Spain) Carlos Alcaraz	Daniil Medvedev	6–3, 6–2	(India) Rohan Bopanna	(Netherlands) Wesley Koolhof (United Kingdom) Neal Skupski	6–3, 2–6, [10–8]
Indian Wells Open Singles – Doubles	(Spain) Carlos Alcaraz	Daniil Medvedev	6–3, 6–2	(Australia) Matthew Ebden*	(Netherlands) Wesley Koolhof (United Kingdom) Neal Skupski	6–3, 2–6, [10–8]
Miami Open Singles – Doubles	Daniil Medvedev	(Italy) Jannik Sinner	7–5, 6–3	(Mexico) Santiago González*	(United States) Austin Krajicek (France) Nicolas Mahut	7–6^{(7–4)}, 7–5
Miami Open Singles – Doubles	Daniil Medvedev	(Italy) Jannik Sinner	7–5, 6–3	(France) Édouard Roger-Vasselin	(United States) Austin Krajicek (France) Nicolas Mahut	7–6^{(7–4)}, 7–5
Monte-Carlo Masters Singles – Doubles	Andrey Rublev*	(Denmark) Holger Rune	5–7, 6–2, 7–5	(Croatia) Ivan Dodig	(Monaco) Romain Arneodo (Austria) Sam Weissborn	6–0, 4–6, [14–12]
Monte-Carlo Masters Singles – Doubles	Andrey Rublev*	(Denmark) Holger Rune	5–7, 6–2, 7–5	(United States) Austin Krajicek*	(Monaco) Romain Arneodo (Austria) Sam Weissborn	6–0, 4–6, [14–12]
Madrid Open Singles – Doubles	(Spain) Carlos Alcaraz	(Germany) Jan-Lennard Struff	6–4, 3–6, 6–3	Karen Khachanov*; Andrey Rublev*	(India) Rohan Bopanna (Australia) Matthew Ebden	6–3, 3–6, [10–3]
Italian Open Singles – Doubles	Daniil Medvedev	(Denmark) Holger Rune	7–5, 7–5	(Monaco) Hugo Nys* (Poland) Jan Zieliński*	(Netherlands) Robin Haase (Netherlands) Botic van de Zandschulp	7–5, 6–1
Canadian Open Singles – Doubles	(Italy) Jannik Sinner*	(Australia) Alex de Minaur	6–4, 6–1	(El Salvador) Marcelo Arévalo*	(United States) Rajeev Ram (United Kingdom) Joe Salisbury	6–3, 6–1
Canadian Open Singles – Doubles	(Italy) Jannik Sinner*	(Australia) Alex de Minaur	6–4, 6–1	(Netherlands) Jean-Julien Rojer	(United States) Rajeev Ram (United Kingdom) Joe Salisbury	6–3, 6–1
Cincinnati Open Singles – Doubles	(Serbia) Novak Djokovic	(Spain) Carlos Alcaraz	5–7, 7–6^{(9–7)}, 7–6^{(7–4)}	(Argentina) Máximo González* (Argentina) Andrés Molteni*	(United Kingdom) Jamie Murray (New Zealand) Michael Venus	3–6, 6–1, [11–9]
Shanghai Masters Singles – Doubles	(Poland) Hubert Hurkacz	Andrey Rublev	6–3, 3–6, 7–6^{(10–8)}	(Spain) Marcel Granollers (Argentina) Horacio Zeballos	(India) Rohan Bopanna (Australia) Matthew Ebden	5–7, 6–2, [10–7]
Paris Masters Singles – Doubles	(Serbia) Novak Djokovic	(Bulgaria) Grigor Dimitrov	6–4, 6–3	(Mexico) Santiago González (France) Édouard Roger-Vasselin	(India) Rohan Bopanna (Australia) Matthew Ebden	6–2, 5–7, [10–7]

== Tournament details ==
Key

- Q = Qualifier
- WC = Wild card
- LL = Lucky loser
- Alt = Alternate
- ITF = ITF entry
- PR = Protected ranking
- SR = Special ranking
- SE = Special exempt
- JE = Junior exempt
- JR = Junior Accelerator Programme entrant
- CO = College Accelerator Programme entrant
- NG = Next Gen Accelerator Program entrant
- w/o = Walkover
- r = Retired
- d = Defaulted

=== Indian Wells Masters ===
==== Singles ====
Quarterfinals
1	(Spain) Carlos Alcaraz	6	6
8	(Canada) Félix Auger-Aliassime	4	4
4	(United States) Taylor Fritz	4	6	4
11	(Italy) Jannik Sinner	6	4	6
5	Daniil Medvedev	6	7
23	(Spain) Alejandro Davidovich Fokina	3	5
10	(United Kingdom) Cameron Norrie	4	4
14	(United States) Frances Tiafoe	6	6

Semifinals
1	(Spain) Carlos Alcaraz	7^{7}	6
11	(Italy) Jannik Sinner	6^{4}	3
5	Daniil Medvedev	7	7^{7}
14	(United States) Frances Tiafoe	5	6^{4}

Final
1	(Spain) Carlos Alcaraz	6	6
5	Daniil Medvedev	3	2

==== Doubles ====
Semifinals
1	(Netherlands) Wesley Koolhof (United Kingdom) Neal Skupski	6	4	[10]
(Mexico) Santiago González (France) Édouard Roger-Vasselin	3	6	[5]
(United States) John Isner (United States) Jack Sock	6^{6}	6^{2}
(India) Rohan Bopanna (Australia) Matthew Ebden	7^{8}	7^{7}

Final
1	(Netherlands) Wesley Koolhof (United Kingdom) Neal Skupski	3	6	[8]
(India) Rohan Bopanna (Australia) Matthew Ebden	6	2	[10]

=== Miami Open ===
==== Singles ====
Quarterfinals
1	(Spain) Carlos Alcaraz	6	6
9	(United States) Taylor Fritz	4	2
(Finland) Emil Ruusuvuori	3	1
10	(Italy) Jannik Sinner	6	6
Q	(United States) Christopher Eubanks	3	5
4	Daniil Medvedev	6	7
25	(Argentina) Francisco Cerúndolo	3	2
14	Karen Khachanov	6	6

Semifinals
1	(Spain) Carlos Alcaraz	7^{7}	4	2
10	(Italy) Jannik Sinner	6^{4}	6	6
4	Daniil Medvedev	7^{7}	3	6
14	Karen Khachanov	6^{5}	6	3

Final
10	(Italy) Jannik Sinner	5	3
4	Daniil Medvedev	7	6

==== Doubles ====
Semifinals
(Mexico) Santiago González (France) Édouard Roger-Vasselin	6	5	[12]
(United States) Nathaniel Lammons (United States) Jackson Withrow	4	7	[10]
(United States) Austin Krajicek (France) Nicolas Mahut	5	7	[10]
(Germany) Kevin Krawietz (France) Fabrice Martin	7	5	[8]

Final
(Mexico) Santiago González (France) Édouard Roger-Vasselin	7^{7}	7
(United States) Austin Krajicek (France) Nicolas Mahut	6^{4}	5

=== Monte Carlo Masters ===
==== Singles ====
Quarterfinals
16	(Italy) Lorenzo Musetti	2	2
7	(Italy) Jannik Sinner	6	6
3	Daniil Medvedev	3	4
6	(Denmark) Holger Rune	6	6
5	Andrey Rublev	6	7^{7}
Q	(Germany) Jan-Lennard Struff	1	6^{5}
8	(United States) Taylor Fritz	6	6
2	(Greece) Stefanos Tsitsipas	2	4

Semifinals
7	(Italy) Jannik Sinner	6	5	5
6	(Denmark) Holger Rune	1	7	7
5	Andrey Rublev	5	6	6
8	(United States) Taylor Fritz	7	1	3

Final
6	(Denmark) Holger Rune	7	2	5
5	Andrey Rublev	5	6	7

==== Doubles ====
Semifinals
(France) Fabrice Martin (Germany) Andreas Mies	6^{1}	4
5	(Croatia) Ivan Dodig (United States) Austin Krajicek	7^{7}	6
(Germany) Kevin Krawietz (Germany) Tim Pütz	6^{7}	6	[7]
WC	(Monaco) Romain Arneodo (Austria) Sam Weissborn	7^{9}	4	[10]

Final
5	(Croatia) Ivan Dodig (United States) Austin Krajicek	6	4	[14]
WC	(Monaco) Romain Arneodo (Austria) Sam Weissborn	0	6	[12]

=== Madrid Open ===
==== Singles ====
Quarterfinals
1	(Spain) Carlos Alcaraz	6	7
10	Karen Khachanov	4	5
LL	(Germany) Daniel Altmaier	3	3
17	(Croatia) Borna Ćorić	6	6
LL	(Germany) Jan-Lennard Struff	7^{7}	5	6
4	(Greece) Stefanos Tsitsipas	6^{5}	7	3
(China) Zhang Zhizhen	6^{3}	4
Q	Aslan Karatsev	7^{7}	6

Semifinals
1	(Spain) Carlos Alcaraz	6	6
17	(Croatia) Borna Ćorić	4	3
LL	(Germany) Jan-Lennard Struff	4	6	6
Q	Aslan Karatsev	6	3	4

Final
1	(Spain) Carlos Alcaraz	6	3	6
LL	(Germany) Jan-Lennard Struff	4	6	3

==== Doubles ====
Semifinals
7	(India) Rohan Bopanna (Australia) Matthew Ebden	5	7^{7}	[10]
8	(Mexico) Santiago González (France) Édouard Roger-Vasselin	7	6^{3}	[4]
4	(El Salvador) Marcelo Arévalo (Netherlands) Jean-Julien Rojer	4	4
Karen Khachanov; Andrey Rublev	6	6

Final
7	(India) Rohan Bopanna (Australia) Matthew Ebden	3	6	[3]
Karen Khachanov; Andrey Rublev	6	3	[10]

=== Italian Open ===
==== Singles ====
Quarterfinals
1	(Serbia) Novak Djokovic	2	6	2
7	(Denmark) Holger Rune	6	4	6
4	(Norway) Casper Ruud	7^{7}	6
24	(Argentina) Francisco Cerúndolo	6^{5}	4
Q	(Germany) Yannick Hanfmann	2	2
3	Daniil Medvedev	6	6
5	(Greece) Stefanos Tsitsipas	6	6
15	(Croatia) Borna Ćorić	3	4

Semifinals
7	(Denmark) Holger Rune	6^{2}	6	6
4	(Norway) Casper Ruud	7^{7}	4	2
3	Daniil Medvedev	7	7
5	(Greece) Stefanos Tsitsipas	5	5

Final
7	(Denmark) Holger Rune	5	5
3	Daniil Medvedev	7	7

==== Doubles ====
Semifinals
1	(Netherlands) Wesley Koolhof (United Kingdom) Neal Skupski	6^{2}	4
(Netherlands) Robin Haase (Netherlands) Botic van de Zandschulp	7^{7}	6
(Monaco) Hugo Nys (Poland) Jan Zieliński	6	7
(Spain) Marcel Granollers (Argentina) Horacio Zeballos	3	5

Final
(Netherlands) Robin Haase (Netherlands) Botic van de Zandschulp	5	1
(Monaco) Hugo Nys (Poland) Jan Zieliński	7	6

=== Canadian Open ===
==== Singles ====
Quarterfinals
1	(Spain) Carlos Alcaraz	3	6	3
12	(United States) Tommy Paul	6	4	6
PR	(France) Gaël Monfils	4	6	3
7	(Italy) Jannik Sinner	6	4	6
(United States) Mackenzie McDonald	4	2
(Spain) Alejandro Davidovich Fokina	6	6
(Australia) Alex de Minaur	7^{9}	7
2	Daniil Medvedev	6^{7}	5

Semifinals
12	(United States) Tommy Paul	4	4
7	(Italy) Jannik Sinner	6	6
(Spain) Alejandro Davidovich Fokina	1	3
(Australia) Alex de Minaur	6	6

Final
7	(Italy) Jannik Sinner	6	6
(Australia) Alex de Minaur	4	1

==== Doubles ====
Semifinals
6	(Germany) Kevin Krawietz (Germany) Tim Pütz	4	4
3	(United States) Rajeev Ram (United Kingdom) Joe Salisbury	6	6
7	(Spain) Marcel Granollers (Argentina) Horacio Zeballos	3	6	[5]
(El Salvador) Marcelo Arévalo (Netherlands) Jean-Julien Rojer	6	3	[10]

Final
3	(United States) Rajeev Ram (United Kingdom) Joe Salisbury	3	1
(El Salvador) Marcelo Arévalo (Netherlands) Jean-Julien Rojer	6	6

=== Cincinnati Masters ===
==== Singles ====
Quarterfinals
1	(Spain) Carlos Alcaraz	4	6	6
Q	(Australia) Max Purcell	6	3	4
(Poland) Hubert Hurkacz	6	7^{10}
LL	(Australia) Alexei Popyrin	1	6^{8}
(France) Adrian Mannarino	2	3
16	(Germany) Alexander Zverev	6	6
9	(United States) Taylor Fritz	0	4
2	(Serbia) Novak Djokovic	6	6

Semifinals
1	(Spain) Carlos Alcaraz	2	7^{7}	6
(Poland) Hubert Hurkacz	6	6^{4}	3
16	(Germany) Alexander Zverev	6^{5}	5
2	(Serbia) Novak Djokovic	7^{7}	7

Final
1	(Spain) Carlos Alcaraz	7	6^{7}	6^{4}
2	(Serbia) Novak Djokovic	5	7^{9}	7^{7}

==== Doubles ====
Semifinals
(United Kingdom) Jamie Murray (New Zealand) Michael Venus	6	6
6	(Mexico) Santiago González (France) Édouard Roger-Vasselin	3	4
(Argentina) Máximo González (Argentina) Andrés Molteni	7^{8}	1	[15]
2	(Croatia) Ivan Dodig (United States) Austin Krajicek	6^{6}	6	[13]

Final
(United Kingdom) Jamie Murray (New Zealand) Michael Venus	6	1	[9]
(Argentina) Máximo González (Argentina) Andrés Molteni	3	6	[11]

=== Shanghai Masters ===
==== Singles ====
Quarterfinals
18	(Bulgaria) Grigor Dimitrov	7^{7}	6
22	(Chile) Nicolás Jarry	6^{2}	4
32	(France) Ugo Humbert	2	3
5	Andrey Rublev	6	6
(Hungary) Fábián Marozsán	6	1	3
16	(Poland) Hubert Hurkacz	4	6	6
19	(United States) Ben Shelton	7^{12}	2	6^{6}
26	(United States) Sebastian Korda	6^{10}	6	7^{8}

Semifinals
18	(Bulgaria) Grigor Dimitrov	6^{7}	3
5	Andrey Rublev	7^{9}	6
16	(Poland) Hubert Hurkacz	6	6
26	(United States) Sebastian Korda	3	4

Final
5	Andrey Rublev	3	6	6^{8}
16	(Poland) Hubert Hurkacz	6	3	7^{10}

==== Doubles ====
Semifinals
7	(Spain) Marcel Granollers (Argentina) Horacio Zeballos	6	6
(Australia) Rinky Hijikata (United Kingdom) Cameron Norrie	2	3
4	(India) Rohan Bopanna (Australia) Matthew Ebden	7^{7}	4	[10]
(France) Sadio Doumbia (France) Fabien Reboul	6^{0}	6	[2]

Final
7	(Spain) Marcel Granollers (Argentina) Horacio Zeballos	5	6	[10]
4	(India) Rohan Bopanna (Australia) Matthew Ebden	7	2	[7]

=== Paris Masters ===
==== Singles ====
Quarterfinals
1	(Serbia) Novak Djokovic	7	6^{3}	6
6	(Denmark) Holger Rune	5	7^{7}	4
13	(Australia) Alex de Minaur	6	3	1
5	Andrey Rublev	4	6	6
11	(Poland) Hubert Hurkacz	1	6	4
(Bulgaria) Grigor Dimitrov	6	4	6
7	(Greece) Stefanos Tsitsipas	6	6
16	Karen Khachanov	3	4

Semifinals
1	(Serbia) Novak Djokovic	5	7^{7}	7
5	Andrey Rublev	7	6^{3}	5
(Bulgaria) Grigor Dimitrov	6	6^{1}	7^{7}
7	(Greece) Stefanos Tsitsipas	3	7^{7}	6^{3}

Final
1	(Serbia) Novak Djokovic	6	6
(Bulgaria) Grigor Dimitrov	4	3

==== Doubles ====
Semifinals
(Finland) Harri Heliövaara (Croatia) Mate Pavić	7^{7}	4	[6]
3	(India) Rohan Bopanna (Australia) Matthew Ebden	6^{3}	6	[10]
4	(United States) Rajeev Ram (United Kingdom) Joe Salisbury	3	3
7	(Mexico) Santiago González (France) Édouard Roger-Vasselin	6	6

Final
3	(India) Rohan Bopanna (Australia) Matthew Ebden	2	7	[7]
7	(Mexico) Santiago González (France) Édouard Roger-Vasselin	6	5	[10]

== See also ==
- ATP Tour Masters 1000
- ATP Tour
- 2023 WTA 1000 tournaments
- WTA Tour
