= 2023 Masters =

2023 Masters may refer to:

- 2023 Masters Tournament, the 87th edition of The Masters golf tournament, held at Augusta National Golf Club in Georgia, United States
- 2023 Masters (curling), a Grand Slam of Curling event held during the 2023–24 curling season
- 2023 Masters (darts), the 11th staging of the professional darts tournament held by the Professional Darts Corporation
- 2023 Masters (snooker), the 49th edition of the professional invitational snooker tournament held in London, England
- 2023 ATP Tour Masters 1000, series of nine top-tier men’s tennis tournaments held during the 2023 season

== See also ==
- Masters (disambiguation)
