= 2023 Mutua Madrid Open – Women's singles =

Women's singles
- 2023 Mutua Madrid Open

Final
- Champion: Aryna Sabalenka
- Runner-up: (Poland) Iga Świątek
- Score: 6–3, 3–6, 6–3

Details
- Draw: 96 (12Q, 8WC)
- Seeds: 32

Events
Singles	men	women
Doubles	men	women
← 2022 ·	Madrid Open	· 2024 →

Aryna Sabalenka defeated Iga Świątek in the final, 6–3, 3–6, 6–3 to win the women's singles tennis title at the 2023 Madrid Open. It was her fifth WTA 1000 title. This marked the first time since 2013 that the top two seeds contested the Madrid final. It was also the first time since 2000 that the top two players on the WTA Tour contested back-to-back finals, after Świątek defeated Sabalenka in Stuttgart the week prior (the last time being Lindsay Davenport and Martina Hingis' meetings in the 2000 Indian Wells and Miami finals).

Ons Jabeur was the reigning champion, but withdrew due to a left calf injury.

== Seeds ==
All seeds received a bye into the second round.

1. (Poland) Iga Świątek (final)
2. Aryna Sabalenka (champion)
3. (United States) Jessica Pegula (quarterfinals)
4. (Tunisia) ~~Ons Jabeur~~ (withdrew)
5. (France) Caroline Garcia (third round)
6. (United States) Coco Gauff (third round)
7. (Kazakhstan) Elena Rybakina (second round)
8. Daria Kasatkina (fourth round)
9. (Greece) Maria Sakkari (semifinals)
10. (Czech Republic) Petra Kvitová (second round)
11. (Czech Republic) Barbora Krejčíková (fourth round)
12. Veronika Kudermetova (semifinals)
13. (Brazil) Beatriz Haddad Maia (second round)
14. Liudmila Samsonova (fourth round)
15. Victoria Azarenka (second round)
16. Ekaterina Alexandrova (fourth round)

17. (Poland) Magda Linette (third round)
18. (Italy) Martina Trevisan (fourth round)
19. (Latvia) Jeļena Ostapenko (third round)
20. (Croatia) Donna Vekić (second round)
21. Anastasia Potapova (third round)
22. (China) Zheng Qinwen (third round)
23. (Canada) Bianca Andreescu (second round)
24. (Belgium) Elise Mertens (fourth round)
25. (Switzerland) Jil Teichmann (second round)
26. (Spain) Paula Badosa (fourth round)
27. (Croatia) Petra Martić (quarterfinals)
28. (United States) Bernarda Pera (third round)
29. (Czech Republic) Marie Bouzková (third round)
30. (Ukraine) Anhelina Kalinina (second round)
31. (Romania) Irina-Camelia Begu (quarterfinals)
32. (Ukraine) Marta Kostyuk (second round)
33. (United States) Shelby Rogers (third round)

Click on the seed number of a player to go to their draw section.

== Draw ==
=== Key ===
- Q = Qualifier
- WC = Wild card
- LL = Lucky loser
- Alt = Alternate
- SE = Special exempt
- PR = Protected ranking
- ITF = ITF entry
- JE = Junior exempt
- w/o = Walkover
- r = Retired
- d = Defaulted
- SR = Special ranking

=== Finals ===
Quarterfinals
1	(Poland) Iga Świątek	6	6
27	(Croatia) Petra Martić	0	3
3	(United States) Jessica Pegula	4	6	4
12	Veronika Kudermetova	6	0	6
9	(Greece) Maria Sakkari	6^{3}	6	6
31	(Romania) Irina-Camelia Begu	7^{7}	4	2
(Egypt) Mayar Sherif	6	2	1
2	Aryna Sabalenka	2	6	6

Semifinals
1	(Poland) Iga Świątek	6	6
12	Veronika Kudermetova	1	1
9	(Greece) Maria Sakkari	4	1
2	Aryna Sabalenka	6	6

Final
1	(Poland) Iga Świątek	3	6	3
2	Aryna Sabalenka	6	3	6

=== Top half ===
==== Section 1 ====
First round
LL	(Austria) J Grabher	6	7^{7}
LL	(Bulgaria) V Tomova	1	6^{5}
WC	(Philippines) A Eala	1	1
(Germany) T Maria	6	6
(Hungary) D Gálfi	6	0	3
(United States) C McNally	4	6	6
(France) A Cornet	6^{6}	6	6
Q	(Romania) E-G Ruse	7^{8}	4	3

Second round
1	(Poland) I Świątek	6	6
LL	(Austria) J Grabher	3	2
(Germany) T Maria	1	3
28	(United States) B Pera	6	6
22	(China) Q Zheng	6	7^{7}
(United States) C McNally	4	6^{3}
(France) A Cornet	6^{2}	3
16	E Alexandrova	7^{7}	6

Third round
1	(Poland) I Świątek	6	6
28	(United States) B Pera	3	2
22	(China) Q Zheng	7	4	2
16	E Alexandrova	5	6	6

Fourth round
1	(Poland) I Świątek	6	6^{3}	6
16	E Alexandrova	4	7^{7}	3

==== Section 2 ====
First round
(Montenegro) D Kovinić	6	6
Q	(Italy) S Errani	4	0
V Gracheva	7^{7}	3	4
(China) Xiy Wang	6^{2}	6	6
PR	(Argentina) N Podoroska	6	3	3
Q	(Germany) L Siegemund	3	6	6
A Kalinskaya	2	6	6
WC	(Czech Republic) B Fruhvirtová	6	4	4

Second round
11	(Czech Republic) B Krejčíková	6	4	6
(Montenegro) D Kovinić	3	6	0
(China) Xiy Wang	3	7^{7}	6
23	(Canada) B Andreescu	6	6^{5}	2
27	(Croatia) P Martić	7^{8}	6
Q	(Germany) L Siegemund	6^{6}	3
A Kalinskaya	7	4	6
7	(Kazakhstan) E Rybakina	5	6	2

Third round
11	(Czech Republic) B Krejčíková	6	6
(China) Xiy Wang	4	1
27	(Croatia) P Martić	6	4	6
A Kalinskaya	3	6	3

Fourth round
11	(Czech Republic) B Krejčíková	3	6^{1}
27	(Croatia) P Martić	6	7^{7}

==== Section 3 ====
First round
(Italy) J Paolini	2	3
Q	(Poland) M Fręch	6	6
WC	(Ukraine) E Svitolina	4	5
A Sasnovich	6	7
Q	(Ukraine) D Yastremska	7^{8}	2	2
Q	(Canada) E Bouchard	6^{6}	6	6
Q	(Slovakia) AK Schmiedlová	2	7^{7}	2
(United States) A Parks	6	6^{5}	6

Second round
3	(United States) J Pegula	7^{7}	6
Q	(Poland) M Fręch	6^{5}	3
A Sasnovich	4	7^{7}	3
29	(Czech Republic) M Bouzková	6	6^{4}	6
18	(Italy) M Trevisan	6	7
Q	(Canada) E Bouchard	2	5
(United States) A Parks	6	7^{7}
15	V Azarenka	2	6^{5}

Third round
3	(United States) J Pegula	6	7^{7}
29	(Czech Republic) M Bouzková	4	6^{2}
18	(Italy) M Trevisan	7^{7}	6
(United States) A Parks	6^{3}	1

Fourth round
3	(United States) J Pegula	6	2	6
18	(Italy) M Trevisan	3	6	3

==== Section 4 ====
First round
A Blinkova	3	0
Q	(Spain) N Párrizas Díaz	6	6
PR	(Romania) J Cristian	5	6	6
(United States) S Stephens	7	4	4
(Ukraine) L Tsurenko	6	6
(Italy) L Bronzetti	1	3
WC	(Andorra) V Jiménez Kasintseva	1	7^{7}	6^{7}
PR	A Pavlyuchenkova	6	6^{5}	7^{9}

Second round
12	V Kudermetova	6	4	6
Q	(Spain) N Párrizas Díaz	3	6	2
PR	(Romania) J Cristian	5	6	2
21	A Potapova	7	3	6
25	(Switzerland) J Teichmann	6	2	4
(Ukraine) L Tsurenko	3	6	6
PR	A Pavlyuchenkova	4	3
8	D Kasatkina	6	6

Third round
12	V Kudermetova	7^{7}	5	6
21	A Potapova	6^{3}	7	3
(Ukraine) L Tsurenko	4	2
8	D Kasatkina	6	6

Fourth round
12	V Kudermetova	7	1	7^{7}
8	D Kasatkina	5	6	6^{2}

=== Bottom half ===
==== Section 5 ====
First round
(Estonia) K Kanepi	7^{7}	2	4
Q	(Spain) I Burillo Escorihuela	6^{5}	6	6
PR	(Czech Republic) B Strýcová	3	6^{5}
(Italy) E Cocciaretto	6	7^{7}
WC	(Spain) R Masarova	6	5	6
(Spain) C Bucșa	3	7	4
(United States) A Anisimova	5	2
Q	(Netherlands) A Rus	7	6

Second round
6	(United States) C Gauff	6	6
Q	(Spain) I Burillo Escorihuela	4	1
(Italy) E Cocciaretto	3	6	4
26	(Spain) P Badosa	6	4	6
20	(Croatia) D Vekić	1	6^{5}
WC	(Spain) R Masarova	6	7^{7}
Q	(Netherlands) A Rus	4	4
9	(Greece) M Sakkari	6	6

Third round
6	(United States) C Gauff	3	0
26	(Spain) P Badosa	6	6
WC	(Spain) R Masarova	6	3	3
9	(Greece) M Sakkari	3	6	6

Fourth round
26	(Spain) P Badosa	4	4
9	(Greece) M Sakkari	6	6

==== Section 6 ====
First round
(Belgium) M Zanevska	6	6
PR	(United States) S Kenin	0	3
(Czech Republic) L Fruhvirtová	6	7
(United States) K Volynets	3	5
(Estonia) A Kontaveit	2	2
(Czech Republic) K Muchová	6	6
(Romania) A Bogdan	4	6	7^{7}
(Hungary) A Bondár	6	4	6^{2}

Second round
14	L Samsonova	6	6
(Belgium) M Zanevska	2	3
(Czech Republic) L Fruhvirtová	0	3
19	(Latvia) J Ostapenko	6	6
31	(Romania) I-C Begu	6	7
(Czech Republic) K Muchová	4	5
(Romania) A Bogdan	2	2
33	(United States) S Rogers	6	6

Third round
14	L Samsonova	6	6
19	(Latvia) J Ostapenko	2	0
31	(Romania) I-C Begu	7	6
33	(United States) S Rogers	5	2

Fourth round
14	L Samsonova	4	4
31	(Romania) I-C Begu	6	6

==== Section 7 ====
First round
(Kazakhstan) Y Putintseva	6	6
(United States) C Liu	4	4
(Italy) C Giorgi	6	4	0^{r}
(Egypt) M Sherif	4	6	0
(China) L Zhu	6^{1}	4
(Canada) R Marino	7^{7}	6
(Germany) J Niemeier	6	6
(China) Xin Wang	4	2

Second round
5	(France) C Garcia	6	6
(Kazakhstan) Y Putintseva	3	4
(Egypt) M Sherif	6	7^{7}
30	(Ukraine) A Kalinina	2	6^{3}
24	(Belgium) E Mertens	6	6
(Canada) R Marino	3	1
(Germany) J Niemeier	7^{11}	6
10	(Czech Republic) P Kvitová	6^{9}	1

Third round
5	(France) C Garcia	6^{2}	3
(Egypt) M Sherif	7^{7}	6
24	(Belgium) E Mertens	6	6
(Germany) J Niemeier	3	4

Fourth round
(Egypt) M Sherif	6	0	6
24	(Belgium) E Mertens	4	6	4

==== Section 8 ====
First round
WC	M Andreeva	6	6
(Canada) L Fernandez	3	4
Q	(Czech Republic) M Vondroušová	6	6
WC	(Spain) M Bassols Ribera	1	3
WC	(Colombia) C Osorio	6	6
Q	(France) C Burel	3	4
(Romania) S Cîrstea	6	3	6
(United States) L Davis	3	6	1

Second round
13	(Brazil) B Haddad Maia	6^{6}	3
WC	M Andreeva	7^{8}	6
Q	(Czech Republic) M Vondroušová	6^{1}	6	4
17	(Poland) M Linette	7^{7}	4	6
32	(Ukraine) M Kostyuk	6	4	3
WC	(Colombia) C Osorio	3	6	6
(Romania) S Cîrstea	4	3
2	A Sabalenka	6	6

Third round
WC	M Andreeva	6	6
17	(Poland) M Linette	3	3
WC	(Colombia) C Osorio	4	5
2	A Sabalenka	6	7

Fourth round
WC	M Andreeva	3	1
2	A Sabalenka	6	6

== Seeded players ==
The following are the seeded players. Seedings are based on WTA rankings as of April 17, 2023. Rankings and points before are as of April 24, 2023.

Seed	Rank	Player	Points before	Points defending	Points earned	Points after	Status
1	1	(Poland) Iga Świątek	8,975	0	650	9,625	Runner-up, lost to Aryna Sabalenka [2]
2	2	Aryna Sabalenka	6,891	10	1000	7,881	Champion, defeated (Poland) Iga Świątek [1]
3	3	(United States) Jessica Pegula	5,735	650	215	5,300	Quarterfinals lost to Veronika Kudermetova [12]
~~4~~	~~4~~	~~(Tunisia) Ons Jabeur~~	5,116	1,000	0	4,116	Withdrew due to calf injury
5	5	(France) Caroline Garcia	5,030	(70)^{†}	65	5,025	Third round lost to (Egypt) Mayar Sherif
6	6	(United States) Coco Gauff	4,400	120	65	4,345	Third round lost to (Spain) Paula Badosa [26]
7	7	(Kazakhstan) Elena Rybakina	4,305	120	10	4,195	Second round lost to Anna Kalinskaya
8	8	Daria Kasatkina	3,505	120	120	3,505	Fourth round lost to Veronika Kudermetova [12]
9	9	(Greece) Maria Sakkari	3,191	65	390	3,516	Semifinals lost to Aryna Sabalenka [2]
10	10	(Czech Republic) Petra Kvitová	3,162	10	10	3,162	Second round lost to (Germany) Jule Niemeier
11	12	(Czech Republic) Barbora Krejčíková	2,497	(1)^{‡}	120	2,616	Fourth round lost to (Croatia) Petra Martić [27]
12	13	Veronika Kudermetova	2,280	10	390	2,660	Semifinals lost to (Poland) Iga Świątek [1]
13	14	(Brazil) Beatriz Haddad Maia	2,276	20+160	10+100	2,206	Second round lost to Mirra Andreeva [WC]
14	18	Liudmila Samsonova	2,062	10	120	2,172	Fourth round lost to (Romania) Irina-Camelia Begu [31]
15	16	Victoria Azarenka	2,237	120	10	2,127	Second round lost to (United States) Alycia Parks
16	17	Ekaterina Alexandrova	2,075	420	120	1,775	Fourth round lost to (Poland) Iga Świątek [1]
17	19	(Poland) Magda Linette	1,810	(55)^{†}	65	1,820	Third round lost to Mirra Andreeva [WC]
18	20	(Italy) Martina Trevisan	1,778	20	120	1,878	Fourth round lost to (United States) Jessica Pegula [3]
19	22	(Latvia) Jeļena Ostapenko	1,740	10	65	1,795	Third round lost to Liudmila Samsonova [14]
20	23	(Croatia) Donna Vekić	1,733	(30)^{†}	10	1,713	Second round lost to (Spain) Rebeka Masarova [WC]
21	25	Anastasia Potapova	1,566	30	65	1,601	Third round lost to Veronika Kudermetova [12]
22	24	(China) Zheng Qinwen	1,729	10	65	1,784	Third round lost to Ekaterina Alexandrova [16]
23	27	(Canada) Bianca Andreescu	1,432	120	10	1,322	Second round lost to (China) Wang Xiyu
24	29	(Belgium) Elise Mertens	1,354	0	120	1,474	Fourth round lost to (Egypt) Mayar Sherif
25	30	(Switzerland) Jil Teichmann	1,300	390+(1)^{^}	10+29^{^}	948	Second round lost to (Ukraine) Lesia Tsurenko
26	42	(Spain) Paula Badosa	1,198	65	120	1,253	Fourth round lost to (Greece) Maria Sakkari [9]
27	33	(Croatia) Petra Martić	1,275	95	215	1,395	Quarterfinals lost to (Poland) Iga Świątek [1]
28	32	(United States) Bernarda Pera	1,279	(29)^{§}	65	1,315	Third round lost to (Poland) Iga Świątek [1]
29	31	(Czech Republic) Marie Bouzková	1,298	150	65	1,213	Third round lost to (United States) Jessica Pegula [3]
30	34	(Ukraine) Anhelina Kalinina	1,272	215	10	1,067	Second round lost to (Egypt) Mayar Sherif
31	35	(Romania) Irina-Camelia Begu	1,258	30	215	1,443	Quarterfinals lost to (Greece) Maria Sakkari [9]
32	36	(Ukraine) Marta Kostyuk	1,245	65	10	1,190	Second round lost to (Colombia) Camila Osorio [WC]
33	38	(United States) Shelby Rogers	1,239	10	65	1,294	Third round lost to (Romania) Irina-Camelia Begu [31]

† The player did not qualify for the main draw in 2022. Points from her 16th best result will be deducted instead.
‡ The player was not required to count points for the 2022 tournament due to a long-term injury exception. Points from her 16th best result will be deducted instead.
§ The player did not qualify for the main draw in 2022 but is defending points from a WTA 125 tournament (Saint-Malo).
§ The player entered a WTA 125 event in the second week of the Madrid tournament and points from that second tournament replaced her 16th best result.

=== Withdrawn players ===
The following players would have been seeded, but withdrew before the tournament began.

Rank	Player	Points before	Points dropped	Points after	Withdrawal reason
11	(Switzerland) Belinda Bencic	2,870	120	2,750	Hip injury
15	(Czech Republic) Karolína Plíšková	2,255	10	2,255	Knee injury
21	(United States) Madison Keys	1,752	10	1,742	
28	(China) Zhang Shuai	1,395	10	1,385	

== Other entry information ==
=== Wild cards ===
- Mirra Andreeva
- (Spain) Marina Bassols Ribera
- (Philippines) Alex Eala
- (Czech Republic) Brenda Fruhvirtová
- (Andorra) Victoria Jiménez Kasintseva
- (Spain) Rebeka Masarova
- (Colombia) Camila Osorio
- (Ukraine) Elina Svitolina

=== Protected ranking ===
- (Romania) Jaqueline Cristian
- (United States) Sofia Kenin
- Anastasia Pavlyuchenkova
- (Argentina) Nadia Podoroska
- (Czech Republic) Barbora Strýcová

=== Withdrawals ===
- & (Switzerland) Belinda Bencic → replaced by (Romania) Sorana Cîrstea
- & (United States) Danielle Collins → replaced by (Canada) Rebecca Marino
- † (Romania) Simona Halep → replaced by (Italy) Jasmine Paolini
- & (Tunisia) Ons Jabeur → replaced by (Bulgaria) Viktoriya Tomova
- & (United States) Madison Keys → replaced by (United States) Katie Volynets
- & (Czech Republic) Linda Nosková → replaced by (Hungary) Anna Bondár
- † (Japan) Naomi Osaka → replaced by (Italy) Lucia Bronzetti
- & (Czech Republic) Karolína Plíšková → replaced by (United States) Caty McNally
- & (United States) Alison Riske-Amritraj → replaced by (Ukraine) Lesia Tsurenko
- & (Czech Republic) Kateřina Siniaková → replaced by (Hungary) Dalma Gálfi
- & (Romania) Patricia Maria Țig → replaced by (Spain) Cristina Bucșa
- † (Australia) Ajla Tomljanović → replaced by (Austria) Julia Grabher
- & (China) Zhang Shuai → replaced by (Belgium) Maryna Zanevska

† – not included on entry list
& – withdrew from entry list

== Qualifying ==
=== Seeds ===
1. (Bulgaria) Viktoriya Tomova (qualifying competition, lucky loser)
2. (Austria) Julia Grabher (qualifying competition, lucky loser)
3. (Spain) Nuria Párrizas Díaz (qualified)
4. (Czech Republic) Markéta Vondroušová (qualified)
5. (Italy) Sara Errani (qualified)
6. (Belgium) Ysaline Bonaventure (first round)
7. (Germany) Anna-Lena Friedsam (qualifying competition)
8. Kamilla Rakhimova (qualifying competition)
9. (Slovakia) Anna Karolína Schmiedlová (qualified)
10. (Czech Republic) Tereza Martincová (first round)
11. (France) Océane Dodin (first round)
12. (Poland) Magdalena Fręch (qualified)
13. (Spain) Sara Sorribes Tormo (first round, retired)
14. (Germany) Laura Siegemund (qualified)
15. (Germany) Tamara Korpatsch (qualifying competition)
16. (Netherlands) Arantxa Rus (qualified)
17. (United Kingdom) Jodie Burrage (qualifying competition)
18. (France) Diane Parry (first round)
19. (France) Clara Burel (qualified)
20. (Germany) Eva Lys (first round, retired)
21. (Australia) Kimberly Birrell (qualifying competition)
22. (France) Léolia Jeanjean (qualifying competition)
23. (United States) Taylor Townsend (qualifying competition)
24. Erika Andreeva (first round)

=== Qualifiers ===
1. (France) Clara Burel
2. (Ukraine) Dayana Yastremska
3. (Spain) Nuria Párrizas Díaz
4. (Czech Republic) Markéta Vondroušová
5. (Italy) Sara Errani
6. (Romania) Elena-Gabriela Ruse
7. (Netherlands) Arantxa Rus
8. (Germany) Laura Siegemund
9. (Slovakia) Anna Karolína Schmiedlová
10. (Spain) Irene Burillo Escorihuela
11. (Canada) Eugenie Bouchard
12. (Poland) Magdalena Fręch

=== Lucky losers ===
1. (Bulgaria) Viktoriya Tomova
2. (Austria) Julia Grabher

=== Qualifying draw ===
==== First qualifier ====
First round
1	(Bulgaria) Viktoriya Tomova	4	6	6
(Spain) Leyre Romero Gormaz	6	2	2
PR	(Slovakia) Kristína Kučová	2	5
19	(France) Clara Burel	6	7

Qualifying competition
1	(Bulgaria) Viktoriya Tomova	6	3	0
19	(France) Clara Burel	1	6	6

==== Second qualifier ====
First round
2	(Austria) Julia Grabher	6	7^{7}
(Croatia) Ana Konjuh	4	6^{4}
(Ukraine) Dayana Yastremska	5
20	(Germany) Eva Lys	1^{r}

Qualifying competition
2	(Austria) Julia Grabher	1	2
(Ukraine) Dayana Yastremska	6	6

==== Third qualifier ====
First round
3	(Spain) Nuria Párrizas Díaz	7^{7}	6
(Greece) Despina Papamichail	6^{2}	2
Elina Avanesyan	4	1
15	(Germany) Tamara Korpatsch	6	6

Qualifying competition
3	(Spain) Nuria Párrizas Díaz	6	7
15	(Germany) Tamara Korpatsch	3	5

==== Fourth qualifier ====
First round
4	(Czech Republic) Markéta Vondroušová	6	6
(Sweden) Mirjam Björklund	3	1
WC	(Spain) Andrea Lázaro García	2	4
23	(United States) Taylor Townsend	6	6

Qualifying competition
4	(Czech Republic) Markéta Vondroušová	6^{7}	6	6
23	(United States) Taylor Townsend	7^{9}	1	0

==== Fifth qualifier ====
First round
5	(Italy) Sara Errani	6	7^{9}
(France) Kristina Mladenovic	1	6^{7}
(Spain) Rosa Vicens Mas	3	1
17	(United Kingdom) Jodie Burrage	6	6

Qualifying competition
5	(Italy) Sara Errani	6^{7}	7	6
17	(United Kingdom) Jodie Burrage	7^{9}	5	2

==== Sixth qualifier ====
First round
6	(Belgium) Ysaline Bonaventure	6	3	1
(Romania) Elena-Gabriela Ruse	3	6	6
WC	(Spain) Jéssica Bouzas Maneiro	6	3	4
22	(France) Léolia Jeanjean	4	6	6

Qualifying competition
(Romania) Elena-Gabriela Ruse	6	6
22	(France) Léolia Jeanjean	4	3

==== Seventh qualifier ====
First round
7	(Germany) Anna-Lena Friedsam	7^{7}	6
(Japan) Moyuka Uchijima	6^{3}	1
WC	(Spain) Carlota Martínez Círez	6^{1}	4
16	(Netherlands) Arantxa Rus	7^{7}	6

Qualifying competition
7	(Germany) Anna-Lena Friedsam	5	3
16	(Netherlands) Arantxa Rus	7	6

==== Eighth qualifier ====
First round
8	Kamilla Rakhimova	6	6
WC	(Spain) Ángela Fita Boluda	4	2
(Slovakia) Viktória Hrunčáková	3	2
14	(Germany) Laura Siegemund	6	6

Qualifying competition
8	Kamilla Rakhimova	4	1
14	(Germany) Laura Siegemund	6	6

==== Ninth qualifier ====
First round
9	(Slovakia) Anna Karolína Schmiedlová	6	6
(Brazil) Laura Pigossi	2	4
(Hungary) Réka Luca Jani	0	1
21	(Australia) Kimberly Birrell	6	6

Qualifying competition
9	(Slovakia) Anna Karolína Schmiedlová	4	6	6
21	(Australia) Kimberly Birrell	6	2	3

==== Tenth qualifier ====
First round
10	(Czech Republic) Tereza Martincová	6^{3}	4
WC	(Spain) Irene Burillo Escorihuela	7^{7}	6
WC	(Colombia) Emiliana Arango	6^{5}	7^{8}	6
24	Erika Andreeva	7^{7}	6^{6}	3

Qualifying competition
WC	(Spain) Irene Burillo Escorihuela	7^{7}	6
WC	(Colombia) Emiliana Arango	6^{2}	4

==== Eleventh qualifier ====
First round
11	(France) Océane Dodin	1	1
(United States) Elizabeth Mandlik	6	6
PR	(Canada) Eugenie Bouchard	6	4
13	(Spain) Sara Sorribes Tormo	1	1^{r}

Qualifying competition
(United States) Elizabeth Mandlik	3	2
PR	(Canada) Eugenie Bouchard	6	6

==== Twelfth qualifier ====
First round
12	(Poland) Magdalena Fręch	2	6	7
(Serbia) Olga Danilović	6	3	5
(Spain) Aliona Bolsova	7	5	6
18	(France) Diane Parry	5	7	3

Qualifying competition
12	(Poland) Magdalena Fręch	6	7
(Spain) Aliona Bolsova	4	5
