= 2023 Mutua Madrid Open – Men's doubles =

Men's doubles
- 2023 Mutua Madrid Open

Final
- Champions: Karen Khachanov; Andrey Rublev
- Runners-up: (India) Rohan Bopanna (Australia) Matthew Ebden
- Score: 6–3, 3–6, [10–3]

Events
Singles	men	women
Doubles	men	women
← 2022 ·	Mutua Madrid Open	· 2024 →

Karen Khachanov and Andrey Rublev defeated Rohan Bopanna and Matthew Ebden in the final, 6–3, 3–6, [10–3] to win the men's doubles tennis title at the 2023 Madrid Open. It was both players' first Masters title in doubles.

Wesley Koolhof and Neal Skupski were the defending champions, but lost in the quarterfinals to Bopanna and Ebden.

Koolhof and Skupski jointly retained the ATP No. 1 doubles ranking after fellow contenders Rajeev Ram and Austin Krajicek both lost in the first round.

== Seeds ==
1. (Netherlands) Wesley Koolhof / (United Kingdom) Neal Skupski (quarterfinals)
2. (United States) Rajeev Ram / (United Kingdom) Joe Salisbury (first round)
3. (Croatia) Ivan Dodig / (United States) Austin Krajicek (first round)
4. (El Salvador) Marcelo Arévalo / (Netherlands) Jean-Julien Rojer (semifinals)
5. (Croatia) Nikola Mektić / (Croatia) Mate Pavić (second round)
6. (United Kingdom) Lloyd Glasspool / (Finland) Harri Heliövaara (second round)
7. (India) Rohan Bopanna / (Australia) Matthew Ebden (final)
8. (Mexico) Santiago González / (France) Édouard Roger-Vasselin (semifinals)

== Draw ==
=== Key ===
- Q = Qualifier
- WC = Wild card
- LL = Lucky loser
- Alt = Alternate
- ITF = ITF entry
- PR = Protected ranking
- SR = Special ranking
- SE = Special exempt
- JE = Junior exempt
- JR = Junior Accelerator Programme entrant
- CO = College Accelerator Programme entrant
- NG = Next Gen Accelerator Program entrant
- w/o = Walkover
- r = Retired
- d = Defaulted

=== Finals ===
Semifinals
7	(India) Rohan Bopanna (Australia) Matthew Ebden	5	7^{7}	[10]
8	(Mexico) Santiago González (France) Édouard Roger-Vasselin	7	6^{3}	[4]
4	(El Salvador) Marcelo Arévalo (Netherlands) Jean-Julien Rojer	4	4
Karen Khachanov; Andrey Rublev	6	6

Final
7	(India) Rohan Bopanna (Australia) Matthew Ebden	3	6	[3]
Karen Khachanov; Andrey Rublev	6	3	[10]

=== Top half ===
First round
1	(Netherlands) W Koolhof (United Kingdom) N Skupski	6	7^{9}
(Germany) K Krawietz (Germany) T Pütz	2	6^{7}
(Brazil) R Matos (Spain) D Vega Hernández	2	3
WC	(Spain) R Carballés Baena (Spain) M Landaluce	6	6
(Spain) A Davidovich Fokina (Finland) E Ruusuvuori	6^{6}	3
(Brazil) M Melo (Germany) A Zverev	7^{8}	6
(Spain) R Bautista Agut (United Kingdom) D Evans	3	6^{4}
7	(India) R Bopanna (Australia) M Ebden	6	7^{7}
3	(Croatia) I Dodig (United States) A Krajicek	4	6	[10]
(Italy) S Bolelli (France) F Martin	6	3	[12]
(Netherlands) M Middelkoop (Germany) A Mies	6	7
(Argentina) M González (Argentina) A Molteni	3	5
(Monaco) H Nys (Poland) J Zieliński	6	6
Alt	(Austria) A Erler (Austria) L Miedler	1	4
WC	(Spain) D Rincón (Jordan) A Shelbayh	5	2
8	(Mexico) S González (France) É Roger-Vasselin	7	6

Second round
1	(Netherlands) W Koolhof (United Kingdom) N Skupski	4	6	[10]
WC	(Spain) R Carballés Baena (Spain) M Landaluce	6	4	[5]
(Brazil) M Melo (Germany) A Zverev	4	6	[5]
7	(India) R Bopanna (Australia) M Ebden	6	1	[10]
(Italy) S Bolelli (France) F Martin	6	6^{3}	[16]
(Netherlands) M Middelkoop (Germany) A Mies	3	7^{7}	[14]
(Monaco) H Nys (Poland) J Zieliński	4	2
8	(Mexico) S González (France) É Roger-Vasselin	6	6

Quarterfinals
1	(Netherlands) W Koolhof (United Kingdom) N Skupski	3	2
7	(India) R Bopanna (Australia) M Ebden	6	6
(Italy) S Bolelli (France) F Martin	6	4	[7]
8	(Mexico) S González (France) É Roger-Vasselin	4	6	[10]

Semifinals
7	(India) R Bopanna (Australia) M Ebden	5	7^{7}	[10]
8	(Mexico) S González (France) É Roger-Vasselin	7	6^{3}	[4]

=== Bottom half ===
First round
6	(United Kingdom) L Glasspool (Finland) H Heliövaara	6	7^{7}
(Poland) H Hurkacz (United States) B Shelton	4	6^{3}
(Canada) F Auger-Aliassime (Canada) D Shapovalov	7^{7}	7^{7}
(Colombia) JS Cabal (Colombia) R Farah	6^{5}	6^{2}
(United States) T Fritz (United States) F Tiafoe	4	6	[10]
(United Kingdom) C Norrie (United States) T Paul	6	4	[8]
WC	(Greece) Pe Tsitsipas (Greece) S Tsitsipas	6^{7}	5
4	(El Salvador) M Arévalo (Netherlands) J-J Rojer	7^{9}	7
5	(Croatia) N Mektić (Croatia) M Pavić	6	5	[10]
(Argentina) S Báez (Australia) J Kubler	3	7	[6]
(Spain) M Granollers (Argentina) H Zeballos	6	4	[7]
K Khachanov; A Rublev	3	6	[10]
(Australia) A de Minaur (Bulgaria) G Dimitrov	6^{6}	6^{5}
(United States) N Lammons (United States) J Withrow	7^{8}	7^{7}
(United Kingdom) J Murray (New Zealand) M Venus	6	3	[10]
2	(United States) R Ram (United Kingdom) J Salisbury	2	6	[4]

Second round
6	(United Kingdom) L Glasspool (Finland) H Heliövaara	4	2
(Canada) F Auger-Aliassime (Canada) D Shapovalov	6	6
(United States) T Fritz (United States) F Tiafoe	4	3
4	(El Salvador) M Arévalo (Netherlands) J-J Rojer	6	6
5	(Croatia) N Mektić (Croatia) M Pavić	7^{7}	3	[6]
K Khachanov; A Rublev	6^{5}	6	[10]
(United States) N Lammons (United States) J Withrow	6	3	[4]
(United Kingdom) J Murray (New Zealand) M Venus	3	6	[10]

Quarterfinals
(Canada) F Auger-Aliassime (Canada) D Shapovalov	6	2	[10]
4	(El Salvador) M Arévalo (Netherlands) J-J Rojer	4	6	[12]
K Khachanov; A Rublev	6^{5}	6	[10]
(United Kingdom) J Murray (New Zealand) M Venus	7^{7}	3	[8]

Semifinals
4	(El Salvador) M Arévalo (Netherlands) J-J Rojer	4	4
K Khachanov; A Rublev	6	6

== Seeded teams ==
The following are the seeded teams. Seedings are based on ATP rankings as of April 24, 2023.

Country	Player	Country	Player	Rank	Seed
NED	Wesley Koolhof	GBR	Neal Skupski	2	1
USA	Rajeev Ram	GBR	Joe Salisbury	9	2
CRO	Ivan Dodig	USA	Austin Krajicek	9	3
ESA	Marcelo Arévalo	NED	Jean-Julien Rojer	16	4
CRO	Nikola Mektić	CRO	Mate Pavić	17	5
GBR	Lloyd Glasspool	FIN	Harri Heliövaara	22	6
IND	Rohan Bopanna	AUS	Matthew Ebden	35	7
MEX	Santiago González	FRA	Édouard Roger-Vasselin	35	8

== Other entry information ==
=== Wildcards ===
- (Spain) Roberto Carballés Baena / (Spain) Martín Landaluce
- (Spain) Daniel Rincón / (Jordan) Abdullah Shelbayh
- (Greece) Petros Tsitsipas / (Greece) Stefanos Tsitsipas

=== Alternates ===
- (Austria) Alexander Erler / (Austria) Lucas Miedler

=== Withdrawals ===
- (Italy) Simone Bolelli / (Italy) Fabio Fognini → replaced by (Italy) Simone Bolelli / (France) Fabrice Martin
- (Argentina) Francisco Cerúndolo / (United Kingdom) Dan Evans → replaced by (Spain) Roberto Bautista Agut / (United Kingdom) Dan Evans
- (Italy) Lorenzo Musetti / (Argentina) Diego Schwartzman → replaced by (Austria) Alexander Erler / (Austria) Lucas Miedler
