= 2023 Mutua Madrid Open – Men's singles =

Men's singles
- 2023 Mutua Madrid Open

Final
- Champion: (Spain) Carlos Alcaraz
- Runner-up: (Germany) Jan-Lennard Struff
- Score: 6–4, 3–6, 6–3

Details
- Draw: 96 (12Q, 8WC)
- Seeds: 32

Events
Singles	men	women
Doubles	men	women
- Madrid Open

Defending champion Carlos Alcaraz defeated Jan-Lennard Struff in the final, 6–4, 3–6, 6–3 to win the men's singles tennis title at the 2023 Madrid Open. It was his fourth Masters 1000 title. Struff was the first lucky loser to reach a Masters final.

This was the first edition in the tournament's 21-year history not to feature Roger Federer, Rafael Nadal, or Novak Djokovic (collectively known as the Big Three) in the main draw. They won 11 of the preceding 16 editions of the Madrid Open (Federer once on hardcourt and twice on clay court, Nadal once on hard court and four times on clay, and Djokovic thrice on clay), reaching 13 finals in total.

Zhang Zhizhen was the first Chinese man to reach the singles quarterfinals of a Masters event. Aslan Karatsev was only the second qualifier to reach the Madrid Open semifinals, after Fabrice Santoro in 2002. The semifinal encounter between Karatsev and Struff was a rematch of their meeting in the qualifying rounds of the event, won by Karatsev; Struff won their semifinal rematch.

== Seeds ==
All seeds received a bye into the second round.

1. (Spain) Carlos Alcaraz (champion)
2. Daniil Medvedev (fourth round)
3. (Norway) Casper Ruud (second round)
4. (Greece) Stefanos Tsitsipas (quarterfinals)
5. Andrey Rublev (fourth round)
6. (Denmark) Holger Rune (third round)
7. (Canada) Félix Auger-Aliassime (second round)
8. (United States) Taylor Fritz (fourth round)
9. (United States) Frances Tiafoe (third round)
10. Karen Khachanov (quarterfinals)
11. (United Kingdom) Cameron Norrie (third round)
12. (Poland) Hubert Hurkacz (third round)
13. (Germany) Alexander Zverev (fourth round)
14. (United States) Tommy Paul (second round)
15. (Italy) Lorenzo Musetti (second round)
16. (Australia) Alex de Minaur (third round)
17. (Croatia) Borna Ćorić (semifinals)
18. (Spain) Pablo Carreño Busta (withdrew)
19. (United Kingdom) Dan Evans (second round)
20. (Spain) Roberto Bautista Agut (third round)
21. (Canada) Denis Shapovalov (second round)
22. (United States) Sebastian Korda (second round)
23. (Netherlands) Botic van de Zandschulp (second round)
24. (Argentina) Francisco Cerúndolo (second round)
25. (Argentina) Sebastián Báez (third round)
26. (Bulgaria) Grigor Dimitrov (third round)
27. (Serbia) Miomir Kecmanović (second round)
28. (Japan) Yoshihito Nishioka (third round)
29. (Spain) Alejandro Davidovich Fokina (fourth round)
30. (Netherlands) Tallon Griekspoor (second round, retired)
31. (Czech Republic) Jiří Lehečka (second round)
32. (United States) Ben Shelton (second round)

Click on the seed number of a player to go to their draw section.

== Draw ==
Key

- Q = Qualifier
- WC = Wild card
- LL = Lucky loser
- Alt = Alternate
- ITF = ITF entry
- PR = Protected ranking
- SR = Special ranking
- SE = Special exempt
- JE = Junior exempt
- JR = Junior Accelerator Programme entrant
- CO = College Accelerator Programme entrant
- NG = Next Gen Accelerator Program entrant
- w/o = Walkover
- r = Retired
- d = Defaulted

=== Finals ===
Quarterfinals
1	(Spain) Carlos Alcaraz	6	7
10	Karen Khachanov	4	5
LL	(Germany) Daniel Altmaier	3	3
17	(Croatia) Borna Ćorić	6	6
LL	(Germany) Jan-Lennard Struff	7^{7}	5	6
4	(Greece) Stefanos Tsitsipas	6^{5}	7	3
(China) Zhang Zhizhen	6^{3}	4
Q	Aslan Karatsev	7^{7}	6

Semifinals
1	(Spain) Carlos Alcaraz	6	6
17	(Croatia) Borna Ćorić	4	3
LL	(Germany) Jan-Lennard Struff	4	6	6
Q	Aslan Karatsev	6	3	4

Final
1	(Spain) Carlos Alcaraz	6	3	6
LL	(Germany) Jan-Lennard Struff	4	6	3

=== Top half ===
==== Section 1 ====
First round
(Finland) E Ruusuvuori	7^{8}	7^{7}
(France) U Humbert	6^{6}	6^{4}
WC	(United States) E Nava	0	7	3
(France) G Barrère	6	5	6
(Argentina) D Schwartzman	5	4
Q	(France) H Grenier	7	6
(Spain) R Carballés Baena	6	6
(Belgium) D Goffin	4	4

Second round
1	(Spain) C Alcaraz	2	6	6
(Finland) E Ruusuvuori	6	4	2
(France) G Barrère	6^{6}	6^{2}
26	(Bulgaria) G Dimitrov	7^{8}	7^{7}
22	(United States) S Korda	6^{5}	6^{7}
Q	(France) H Grenier	7^{7}	7^{9}
(Spain) R Carballés Baena	7^{8}	5	0
13	(Germany) A Zverev	6^{6}	7	6

Third round
1	(Spain) C Alcaraz	6	7
26	(Bulgaria) G Dimitrov	2	5
Q	(France) H Grenier	1	0
13	(Germany) A Zverev	6	6

Fourth round
1	(Spain) C Alcaraz	6	6
13	(Germany) A Zverev	1	2

==== Section 2 ====
First round
(Brazil) T Monteiro	7^{11}	4	6
Q	(Croatia) B Gojo	6^{9}	6	3
(Australia) A Popyrin	6	4	4
(France) Q Halys	4	6	6
(China) Y Wu	2	4
(Slovakia) A Molčan	6	6
(United States) M Cressy	7^{7}	3	6^{4}
(Switzerland) S Wawrinka	6^{3}	6	7^{7}

Second round
10	K Khachanov	6	3	6
(Brazil) T Monteiro	3	6	3
(France) Q Halys	6	6^{5}	3
20	(Spain) R Bautista Agut	4	7^{7}	6
28	(Japan) Y Nishioka	5	6	6
(Slovakia) A Molčan	7	4	4
(Switzerland) S Wawrinka	5	4
5	A Rublev	7	6

Third round
10	K Khachanov	7	4	6
20	(Spain) R Bautista Agut	5	6	3
28	(Japan) Y Nishioka	2	5
5	A Rublev	6	7

Fourth round
10	K Khachanov	7^{10}	6
5	A Rublev	6^{8}	4

==== Section 3 ====
First round
Q	(France) B Paire	1	6	6^{6}
Q	(Italy) M Arnaldi	6	3	7^{8}
(Australia) T Kokkinakis	6^{7}	6^{3}
(Spain) J Munar	7^{9}	7^{7}
LL	P Kotov	3	6	4
(Germany) O Otte	6	4	6
(Peru) JP Varillas	4	6	3
Q	(Germany) Y Hanfmann	6	3	6

Second round
3	(Norway) C Ruud	3	4
Q	(Italy) M Arnaldi	6	6
(Spain) J Munar	7^{7}	0
30	(Netherlands) T Griekspoor	6^{3}	0^{r}
LL	(Germany) D Altmaier	6	7
(Germany) O Otte	4	5
Q	(Germany) Y Hanfmann	6	7^{7}
15	(Italy) L Musetti	4	6^{3}

Third round
Q	(Italy) M Arnaldi	6	3	1
(Spain) J Munar	3	6	6
LL	(Germany) D Altmaier	7^{7}	6
Q	(Germany) Y Hanfmann	6^{3}	3

Fourth round
(Spain) J Munar	3	0
LL	(Germany) D Altmaier	6	6

==== Section 4 ====
First round
WC	(Spain) M Landaluce	2	1
(France) R Gasquet	6	6
PR	(France) J Chardy	3	4
WC	(France) H Gaston	6	6
(Spain) A Ramos Viñolas	4	7^{7}	6
I Ivashka	6	6^{3}	2
(Kazakhstan) A Bublik	7^{17}	6^{4}	6
(Colombia) DE Galán	6^{15}	7^{7}	4

Second round
12	(Poland) H Hurkacz	6^{9}	6	7
(France) R Gasquet	7^{11}	4	5
WC	(France) H Gaston	3	3
17	(Croatia) B Ćorić	6	6
29	(Spain) A Davidovich Fokina	6	6
(Spain) A Ramos Viñolas	3	4
(Kazakhstan) A Bublik	1	6	6^{9}
6	(Denmark) H Rune	6	4	7^{11}

Third round
12	(Poland) H Hurkacz	6^{3}	3
17	(Croatia) B Ćorić	7^{7}	6
29	(Spain) A Davidovich Fokina	7^{7}	5	7^{7}
6	(Denmark) H Rune	6^{1}	7	6^{5}

Fourth round
17	(Croatia) B Ćorić	6^{5}	6	7^{7}
29	(Spain) A Davidovich Fokina	7^{7}	3	6^{5}

=== Bottom half ===
==== Section 5 ====
First round
(Australia) J Kubler	3	3
(Serbia) D Lajović	6	6
(Italy) L Sonego	3	1
LL	(Germany) J-L Struff	6	6
WC	(Jordan) A Shelbayh	1	4
(Argentina) P Cachin	6	6
(Argentina) TM Etcheverry	6	6
(France) A Mannarino	4	0

Second round
7	(Canada) F Auger-Aliassime	2	6	6^{5}
(Serbia) D Lajović	6	3	7^{7}
LL	(Germany) J-L Struff	4	7^{7}	7
32	(United States) B Shelton	6	6^{4}	5
24	(Argentina) F Cerúndolo	1	6^{6}
(Argentina) P Cachin	6	7^{8}
(Argentina) TM Etcheverry	3	6^{5}
9	(United States) F Tiafoe	6	7^{7}

Third round
(Serbia) D Lajović	7^{7}	3	3
LL	(Germany) J-L Struff	6^{2}	6	6
(Argentina) P Cachin	6	7^{7}
9	(United States) F Tiafoe	1	6^{2}

Fourth round
LL	(Germany) J-L Struff	7^{9}	6^{7}	6
(Argentina) P Cachin	6^{7}	7^{9}	3

==== Section 6 ====
First round
Q	R Safiullin	6	3	6
(Chile) N Jarry	2	6	3
(United States) M McDonald	6	3	6^{4}
(Spain) B Zapata Miralles	3	6	7^{7}
(Portugal) N Borges	2	6^{7}
(United States) M Giron	6	7^{9}
PR	(United Kingdom) K Edmund	4	1
WC	(Austria) D Thiem	6	6

Second round
14	(United States) T Paul	3	6^{3}
Q	R Safiullin	6	7^{7}
(Spain) B Zapata Miralles	6	6
19	(United Kingdom) D Evans	3	2
25	(Argentina) S Báez	3	6	6
(United States) M Giron	6	3	4
WC	(Austria) D Thiem	6	1	6^{5}
4	(Greece) S Tsitsipas	3	6	7^{7}

Third round
Q	R Safiullin	3	6	3
(Spain) B Zapata Miralles	6	3	6
25	(Argentina) S Báez	5	6	3
4	(Greece) S Tsitsipas	7	3	6

Fourth round
(Spain) B Zapata Miralles	3	1
4	(Greece) S Tsitsipas	6	6

==== Section 7 ====
First round
(Australia) C O'Connell	6	6^{2}	6
(Serbia) F Krajinović	4	7^{7}	2
(Chile) C Garín	7^{7}	6
(Switzerland) M-A Hüsler	6^{5}	2
Q	(Austria) J Rodionov	6^{6}	4
(China) Z Zhang	7^{8}	6
(France) C Moutet	3	3
Q	(Japan) Y Watanuki	6	6

Second round
8	(United States) T Fritz	7^{13}	6
(Australia) C O'Connell	6^{11}	4
(Chile) C Garín	7^{7}	6^{5}	6
27	(Serbia) M Kecmanović	6^{3}	7^{7}	4
21	(Canada) D Shapovalov	7^{7}	4	6^{1}
(China) Z Zhang	6^{4}	6	7^{7}
Q	(Japan) Y Watanuki	4	6^{5}
11	(United Kingdom) C Norrie	6	7^{7}

Third round
8	(United States) T Fritz	6	7^{7}
(Chile) C Garín	1	6^{4}
(China) Z Zhang	2	7^{7}	7^{7}
11	(United Kingdom) C Norrie	6	6^{2}	6^{2}

Fourth round
8	(United States) T Fritz	6	6^{5}	6^{8}
(China) Z Zhang	3	7^{7}	7^{10}

==== Section 8 ====
First round
(Hungary) M Fucsovics	6^{4}	3
Q	(Italy) M Cecchinato	7^{7}	6
Q	A Karatsev	7^{7}	7
(Serbia) L Djere	6^{5}	5
(United States) JJ Wolf	4	4
Q	A Shevchenko	6	6
Q	(Italy) A Vavassori	6	7^{9}
(United Kingdom) A Murray	2	6^{7}

Second round
16	(Australia) A de Minaur	6	7^{7}
Q	(Italy) M Cecchinato	4	6^{5}
Q	A Karatsev	6	7
23	(Netherlands) B van de Zandschulp	2	5
31	(Czech Republic) J Lehečka	1	1
Q	A Shevchenko	6	6
Q	(Italy) A Vavassori	4	3
2	D Medvedev	6	6

Third round
16	(Australia) A de Minaur	3	6	4
Q	A Karatsev	6	4	6
Q	A Shevchenko	6	1	5
2	D Medvedev	4	6	7

Fourth round
Q	A Karatsev	7^{7}	6
2	D Medvedev	6^{1}	4

== Seeded players ==
The following are the seeded players. Seedings are based on ATP rankings as of April 24, 2023. Rankings and points before are as of April 24, 2023.

Because the men's tournament is being expanded to two weeks this year, players are defending points from the 2022 Madrid Open, as well as tournaments that took place during the week of April 25, 2022 (Estoril and Munich). Points from the 2022 Madrid Open are listed first in the "Points defending" column.

Seed	Rank	Player	Points before	Points defending	Points earned	Points after	Status
1	2	(Spain) Carlos Alcaraz	6,770	1,000	1,000	6,770	Champion, defeated (Germany) Jan-Lennard Struff [LL]
2	3	Daniil Medvedev	5,240	0	90	5,330	Fourth round lost to Aslan Karatsev [Q]
3	4	(Norway) Casper Ruud	5,210	10+45	10+0	5,165	Second round lost to (Italy) Matteo Arnaldi [Q]
4	5	(Greece) Stefanos Tsitsipas	5,195	360	180	5,015	Quarterfinals lost to (Germany) Jan-Lennard Struff [LL]
5	6	Andrey Rublev	4,280	180	90	4,190	Fourth round lost to Karen Khachanov [10]
6	7	(Denmark) Holger Rune	4,070	250^{†}	45	3,865	Third round lost to (Spain) Alejandro Davidovich Fokina [29]
7	9	(Canada) Félix Auger-Aliassime	3,405	180	10	3,235	Second round lost to (Serbia) Dušan Lajović
8	10	(United States) Taylor Fritz	3,290	0	90	3,380	Fourth round lost to (China) Zhang Zhizhen
9	11	(United States) Frances Tiafoe	2,870	10+150	45+0	2,755	Third round lost to (Argentina) Pedro Cachin
10	12	Karen Khachanov	2,855	10	180	3,025	Quarterfinals lost to (Spain) Carlos Alcaraz [1]
11	13	(United Kingdom) Cameron Norrie	2,725	90	45	2,680	Third round lost to (China) Zhang Zhizhen
12	15	(Poland) Hubert Hurkacz	2,660	180	45	2,525	Third round lost to (Croatia) Borna Ćorić [17]
13	16	(Germany) Alexander Zverev	2,140	600	90	1,630	Fourth round lost to (Spain) Carlos Alcaraz [1]
14	17	(United States) Tommy Paul	2,070	10+0^{§}	10+32^{§}	2,102	Second round lost to Roman Safiullin
15	18	(Italy) Lorenzo Musetti	2,065	115	10	1,960	Second round lost to (Germany) Yannick Hanfmann [Q]
16	19	(Australia) Alex de Minaur	1,995	45	45	1,995	Third round lost to Aslan Karatsev [Q]
17	20	(Croatia) Borna Ćorić	1,890	10	360	2,240	Semifinals lost to (Spain) Carlos Alcaraz [1]
~~18~~	~~22~~	~~(Spain) Pablo Carreño Busta~~	1,795	10	0	1,785	Withdrew due to elbow injury
19	24	(United Kingdom) Dan Evans	1,560	90	10	1,480	Second round lost to (Spain) Bernabé Zapata Miralles
20	25	(Spain) Roberto Bautista Agut	1,475	45	45	1,475	Third round lost to Karen Khachanov [10]
21	27	(Canada) Denis Shapovalov	1,425	45	10	1,390	Second round lost to (China) Zhang Zhizhen
22	28	(United States) Sebastian Korda	1,390	45+90	10+0	1,265	Second round lost to (France) Hugo Grenier [Q]
23	29	(Netherlands) Botic van de Zandschulp	1,390	45+150	10+45	1,250	Second round lost to Aslan Karatsev [Q]
24	30	(Argentina) Francisco Cerúndolo	1,235	(45)^{‡}	10	1,200	Second round lost to (Argentina) Pedro Cachin
25	31	(Argentina) Sebastián Báez	1,190	250^{†}	45	985	Third round lost to (Greece) Stefanos Tsitsipas [4]
26	32	(Bulgaria) Grigor Dimitrov	1,170	90	45	1,125	Third round lost to (Spain) Carlos Alcaraz [1]
27	33	(Serbia) Miomir Kecmanović	1,170	45+90	10+10	1,055	Second round lost to (Chile) Cristian Garín
28	34	(Japan) Yoshihito Nishioka	1,138	12^{†}	45	1,171	Third round lost to Andrey Rublev [5]
29	35	(Spain) Alejandro Davidovich Fokina	1,095	45+45	90+20	1,115	Fourth round lost to (Croatia) Borna Ćorić [17]
30	36	(Netherlands) Tallon Griekspoor	1,094	(13)^{‡}	10	1,091	Second round retired against (Spain) Jaume Munar
31	37	(Czech Republic) Jiří Lehečka	1,046	60+12^{†}	10+8	992	Second round lost to Alexander Shevchenko [Q]
32	38	(United States) Ben Shelton	1,042	(7)^{‡}+(10)^{§}	10+32	1067	Second round lost to (Germany) Jan-Lennard Struff [LL]

† The player did not qualify for the main draw in 2022, but is defending points from Estoril, Munich, or Mauthausen (ATP Challenger).
‡ The player did not qualify for the main draw in 2022. Points for his 19th best result will be deducted instead.
§ The player entered an ATP Challenger Tour event in the second week of the Madrid tournament and points from that second tournament replaced his 19th (or 18th) best result.

=== Withdrawn players ===
The following players would have been seeded, but withdrew before the tournament began.

Rank	Player	Points before	Points dropped	Points after	Withdrawal reason
1	(Serbia) Novak Djokovic	7,135	360	6,775	Elbow injury
8	(Italy) Jannik Sinner	3,615	90	3,525	Sickness
14	(Spain) Rafael Nadal	2,715	180	2,535	Left hip injury
21	(Italy) Matteo Berrettini	1,832	0	1,832	Abdominal injury
23	(Croatia) Marin Čilić	1,645	45	1,600	Knee injury
26	(Australia) Nick Kyrgios	1,465	0	1,465	Left knee injury

== Other entry information ==
=== Wildcards ===
- (France) Hugo Gaston
- (Spain) Martín Landaluce
- (United States) Emilio Nava
- (Jordan) Abedallah Shelbayh
- (Austria) Dominic Thiem

=== Protected ranking ===
- (France) Jérémy Chardy
- (United Kingdom) Kyle Edmund

=== Withdrawals ===
- (Italy) Matteo Berrettini → replaced by (Peru) Juan Pablo Varillas
- (France) Benjamin Bonzi → replaced by Ilya Ivashka
- (United States) Jenson Brooksby → replaced by (Serbia) Filip Krajinović
- (Spain) Pablo Carreño Busta → replaced by (Germany) Daniel Altmaier
- (Croatia) Marin Čilić → replaced by (Australia) Christopher O'Connell
- (Argentina) Federico Coria → replaced by (Germany) Oscar Otte
- (Bolivia) Hugo Dellien → replaced by (Brazil) Thiago Monteiro
- (Serbia) Novak Djokovic → replaced by (China) Zhang Zhizhen
- (United Kingdom) Jack Draper → replaced by (Colombia) Daniel Elahi Galán
- (United States) John Isner → replaced by (Chile) Cristian Garín
- (South Korea) Kwon Soon-woo → replaced by (France) Jérémy Chardy
- (Australia) Nick Kyrgios → replaced by (Switzerland) Stan Wawrinka
- (France) Constant Lestienne → replaced by (Germany) Jan-Lennard Struff
- (Spain) Rafael Nadal → replaced by (France) Quentin Halys
- (United States) Brandon Nakashima → replaced by Pavel Kotov
- (Argentina) Guido Pella → replaced by (Spain) Roberto Carballés Baena
- (France) Arthur Rinderknech → replaced by (France) Ugo Humbert
- (Italy) Jannik Sinner → replaced by (Australia) Thanasi Kokkinakis
- (Sweden) Mikael Ymer → replaced by (Australia) Alexei Popyrin

== Qualifying ==
=== Seeds ===
1. (Germany) Jan-Lennard Struff (qualifying competition, lucky loser)
2. (Italy) Marco Cecchinato (qualified)
3. (France) Luca Van Assche (first round)
4. (Germany) Daniel Altmaier (qualifying competition, lucky loser)
5. (France) Alexandre Müller (first round)
6. Alexander Shevchenko (qualified)
7. (Japan) Taro Daniel (first round)
8. (Italy) Matteo Arnaldi (qualified)
9. Roman Safiullin (qualified)
10. Pavel Kotov (qualifying competition, lucky loser)
11. (Croatia) Borna Gojo (qualified)
12. (Germany) Yannick Hanfmann (qualified)
13. (Japan) Yosuke Watanuki (qualified)
14. (Finland) Otto Virtanen (first round)
15. (Austria) Jurij Rodionov (qualified)
16. (Austria) Sebastian Ofner (qualifying competition)
17. (France) Arthur Fils (qualifying competition)
18. (Argentina) Juan Manuel Cerúndolo (qualifying competition)
19. (Italy) Giulio Zeppieri (qualifying competition)
20. (Italy) Francesco Passaro (first round)
21. (France) Hugo Grenier (qualified)
22. Aslan Karatsev (qualified)
23. (Hungary) Zsombor Piros (qualifying competition)
24. (Spain) Pedro Martínez (first round)

=== Qualifiers ===
1. Aslan Karatsev
2. (Italy) Marco Cecchinato
3. (Italy) Andrea Vavassori
4. (Austria) Jurij Rodionov
5. (France) Benoît Paire
6. Alexander Shevchenko
7. (France) Hugo Grenier
8. (Italy) Matteo Arnaldi
9. Roman Safiullin
10. (Japan) Yosuke Watanuki
11. (Croatia) Borna Gojo
12. (Germany) Yannick Hanfmann

=== Lucky losers ===
1. (Germany) Jan-Lennard Struff
2. Pavel Kotov
3. (Germany) Daniel Altmaier

=== Qualifying draw ===
==== First qualifier ====
First round
1	(Germany) Jan-Lennard Struff	7	6
(Italy) Luca Nardi	5	4
(Italy) Raúl Brancaccio	4	0
22	Aslan Karatsev	6	6

Qualifying competition
1	(Germany) Jan-Lennard Struff	4	2
22	Aslan Karatsev	6	6

==== Second qualifier ====
First round
2	(Italy) Marco Cecchinato	3	6	6
(Kazakhstan) Timofey Skatov	6	2	3
(Slovakia) Jozef Kovalík	4	6	4
19	(Italy) Giulio Zeppieri	6	4	6

Qualifying competition
2	(Italy) Marco Cecchinato	7^{7}	6
19	(Italy) Giulio Zeppieri	6^{5}	4

==== Third qualifier ====
First round
3	(France) Luca Van Assche	3	6^{4}
(Brazil) Felipe Meligeni Alves	6	7^{7}
(Italy) Andrea Vavassori	6	6^{5}	6
14	(Finland) Otto Virtanen	1	7^{7}	2

Qualifying competition
(Brazil) Felipe Meligeni Alves	3	6^{12}
(Italy) Andrea Vavassori	6	7^{14}

==== Fourth qualifier ====
First round
4	(Germany) Daniel Altmaier	6	6
PR	(Hungary) Attila Balázs	1	1
(France) Laurent Lokoli	6	2	4
15	(Austria) Jurij Rodionov	2	6	6

Qualifying competition
4	(Germany) Daniel Altmaier	4	3
15	(Austria) Jurij Rodionov	6	6

==== Fifth qualifier ====
First round
5	(France) Alexandre Müller	4	6^{1}
(Japan) Kaichi Uchida	6	7^{7}
WC	(France) Benoît Paire	3	7^{7}	6
20	(Italy) Francesco Passaro	6	6^{4}	2

Qualifying competition
(Japan) Kaichi Uchida	6	3	4
WC	(France) Benoît Paire	3	6	6

==== Sixth qualifier ====
First round
6	Alexander Shevchenko	7^{10}	7^{7}
(Switzerland) Antoine Bellier	6^{8}	6^{4}
(Chinese Taipei) Tseng Chun-hsin	3	4
18	(Argentina) Juan Manuel Cerúndolo	6	6

Qualifying competition
6	Alexander Shevchenko	7^{7}	6
18	(Argentina) Juan Manuel Cerúndolo	6^{5}	4

==== Seventh qualifier ====
First round
7	(Japan) Taro Daniel	1	7	2
WC	(Spain) Daniel Rincón	6	5	6
(Slovakia) Lukáš Klein	7^{8}	3	4
21	(France) Hugo Grenier	6^{6}	6	6

Qualifying competition
WC	(Spain) Daniel Rincón	3	7^{7}	2
21	(France) Hugo Grenier	6	6^{4}	6

==== Eighth qualifier ====
First round
8	(Italy) Matteo Arnaldi	6	6
(Austria) Filip Misolic	1	4
WC	(Morocco) Reda Bennani	2	2
17	(France) Arthur Fils	6	6

Qualifying competition
8	(Italy) Matteo Arnaldi	3	6	6
17	(France) Arthur Fils	6	3	2

==== Ninth qualifier ====
First round
9	Roman Safiullin	6	6
(Portugal) João Sousa	2	2
(Sweden) Elias Ymer	3	1
16	(Austria) Sebastian Ofner	6	6

Qualifying competition
9	Roman Safiullin	6	7^{7}
16	(Austria) Sebastian Ofner	4	6^{4}

==== Tenth qualifier ====
First round
10	Pavel Kotov	6	3	7^{8}
(Belgium) Kimmer Coppejans	4	6	6^{6}
(Argentina) Federico Delbonis	4	6^{5}
13	(Japan) Yosuke Watanuki	6	7^{7}

Qualifying competition
10	Pavel Kotov	7^{9}	3	6^{3}
13	(Japan) Yosuke Watanuki	6^{7}	6	7^{7}

==== Eleventh qualifier ====
First round
11	(Croatia) Borna Gojo	6	6
(United Kingdom) Jan Choinski	3	2
WC	(Spain) Pablo Andújar	6	1	2
23	(Hungary) Zsombor Piros	3	6	6

Qualifying competition
11	(Croatia) Borna Gojo	7^{8}	6
23	(Hungary) Zsombor Piros	6^{6}	2

==== Twelfth qualifier ====
First round
12	(Germany) Yannick Hanfmann	6	6
(Germany) Maximilian Marterer	2	4
WC	(France) Arthur Cazaux	4	6	7^{8}
24	(Spain) Pedro Martínez	6	2	6^{6}

Qualifying competition
12	(Germany) Yannick Hanfmann	6	6
WC	(France) Arthur Cazaux	2	4
