= 2023 Mutua Madrid Open – Women's doubles =

Women's doubles
- 2023 Mutua Madrid Open

Final
- Champions: Victoria Azarenka (Brazil) Beatriz Haddad Maia
- Runners-up: (United States) Coco Gauff (United States) Jessica Pegula
- Score: 6–1, 6–4

Events
Singles	men	women
Doubles	men	women
← 2022 ·	Mutua Madrid Open	· 2024 →

Victoria Azarenka and Beatriz Haddad Maia defeated Coco Gauff and Jessica Pegula in the final, 6–1, 6–4 to win the women's doubles tennis title at the 2023 Madrid Open.

Gabriela Dabrowski and Giuliana Olmos were the reigning champions, but did not defend their title together. Both lost to Gauff and Pegula: Dabrowski, partnering Luisa Stefani, in the quarterfinals, and Olmos, alongside Alexandra Panova, in the second round.

== Seeds ==
1. (United States) Coco Gauff / (United States) Jessica Pegula (final)
2. (Ukraine) Lyudmyla Kichenok / (Latvia) Jeļena Ostapenko (first round)
3. (United States) Desirae Krawczyk / (Netherlands) Demi Schuurs (first round)
4. (Australia) Storm Hunter / (Belgium) Elise Mertens (second round)
5. (United States) Nicole Melichar-Martinez / (Australia) Ellen Perez (first round, retired)
6. (Canada) Gabriela Dabrowski / (Brazil) Luisa Stefani (quarterfinals)
7. (Japan) Shuko Aoyama / (Japan) Ena Shibahara (first round)
8. (China) Xu Yifan / (China) Yang Zhaoxuan (second round)

== Draw ==
=== Key ===
- Q = Qualifier
- WC = Wild card
- LL = Lucky loser
- Alt = Alternate
- SE = Special exempt
- PR = Protected ranking
- ITF = ITF entry
- JE = Junior exempt
- w/o = Walkover
- r = Retired
- d = Defaulted
- SR = Special ranking

=== Finals ===
Semifinals
1	(United States) Coco Gauff (United States) Jessica Pegula	7	7^{7}
(Ukraine) Marta Kostyuk (Romania) Elena-Gabriela Ruse	5	6^{5}
Victoria Azarenka (Brazil) Beatriz Haddad Maia	6	0	[10]
(Canada) Leylah Fernandez (United States) Taylor Townsend	4	6	[6]

Final
1	(United States) Coco Gauff (United States) Jessica Pegula	1	4
Victoria Azarenka (Brazil) Beatriz Haddad Maia	6	6

=== Top half ===
First round
1	(United States) C Gauff (United States) J Pegula	7^{7}	7^{7}
(Chile) A Guarachi (New Zealand) E Routliffe	6^{5}	6^{1}
(Mexico) G Olmos; A Panova	6	7
(Belgium) K Flipkens (Poland) A Rosolska	1	5
(Ukraine) N Kichenok (Belgium) K Zimmermann	7^{7}	6^{5}	[1]
WC	E Andreeva; M Andreeva	6^{1}	7^{7}	[10]
PR	(United States) S Kenin (Poland) M Linette	6	2	[7]
6	(Canada) G Dabrowski (Brazil) L Stefani	4	6	[10]
4	(Australia) S Hunter (Belgium) E Mertens	6	6
D Kasatkina (Italy) M Trevisan	3	3
V Kudermetova; L Samsonova	6	5	[5]
(Romania) M Niculescu (Japan) M Ninomiya	2	7	[10]
(Hungary) T Babos (Kazakhstan) A Danilina	4	6	[10]
(Ukraine) M Kostyuk (Romania) E-G Ruse	6	4	[12]
PR	A Pavlyuchenkova (Kazakhstan) E Rybakina	6	6
7	(Japan) S Aoyama (Japan) E Shibahara	0	1

Second round
1	(United States) C Gauff (United States) J Pegula	7^{10}	6
(Mexico) G Olmos; A Panova	6^{8}	3
WC	E Andreeva; M Andreeva	3	5
6	(Canada) G Dabrowski (Brazil) L Stefani	6	7
4	(Australia) S Hunter (Belgium) E Mertens	4	6	[8]
(Romania) M Niculescu (Japan) M Ninomiya	6	2	[10]
(Ukraine) M Kostyuk (Romania) E-G Ruse	w/o
PR	A Pavlyuchenkova (Kazakhstan) E Rybakina

Quarterfinals
1	(United States) C Gauff (United States) J Pegula	6	3	[10]
6	(Canada) G Dabrowski (Brazil) L Stefani	4	6	[5]
(Romania) M Niculescu (Japan) M Ninomiya	6	2	[5]
(Ukraine) M Kostyuk (Romania) E-G Ruse	2	6	[10]

Semifinals
1	(United States) C Gauff (United States) J Pegula	7	7^{7}
(Ukraine) M Kostyuk (Romania) E-G Ruse	5	6^{5}

=== Bottom half ===
First round
8	(China) Y Xu (China) Z Yang	7	6
E Alexandrova; A Potapova	5	2
WC	(Spain) P Badosa (United States) B Mattek-Sands	3	7	[10]
WC	(Czech Republic) B Fruhvirtová (Czech Republic) L Fruhvirtová	6	5	[7]
(Germany) L Siegemund; V Zvonareva	7	2	[8]
A Kalinskaya (United States) C McNally	5	6	[10]
V Azarenka (Brazil) B Haddad Maia	6	3	[10]
3	(United States) D Krawczyk (Netherlands) D Schuurs	2	6	[7]
5	(United States) N Melichar-Martinez (Australia) E Perez	2	1^{r}
(Japan) M Kato (Indonesia) A Sutjiadi	6	4
PR	(Chinese Taipei) S-w Hsieh (Czech Republic) B Strýcová	1	6	[10]
(Chinese Taipei) H-c Chan (Chinese Taipei) L Chan	6	2	[3]
(Slovakia) T Mihalíková (United States) A Parks	5	3
(Georgia (country)) O Kalashnikova; Y Sizikova	7	6
(Canada) L Fernandez (United States) T Townsend	6	6
2	(Ukraine) L Kichenok (Latvia) J Ostapenko	2	4

Second round
8	(China) Y Xu (China) Z Yang	3	1
WC	(Spain) P Badosa (United States) B Mattek-Sands	6	6
A Kalinskaya (United States) C McNally
V Azarenka (Brazil) B Haddad Maia	w/o
(Japan) M Kato (Indonesia) A Sutjiadi	3	3
PR	(Chinese Taipei) S-w Hsieh (Czech Republic) B Strýcová	6	6
(Georgia (country)) O Kalashnikova; Y Sizikova	3	5
(Canada) L Fernandez (United States) T Townsend	6	7

Quarterfinals
WC	(Spain) P Badosa (United States) B Mattek-Sands	6^{0}	5
V Azarenka (Brazil) B Haddad Maia	7^{7}	7
PR	(Chinese Taipei) S-w Hsieh (Czech Republic) B Strýcová	0	6^{3}
(Canada) L Fernandez (United States) T Townsend	6	7^{7}

Semifinals
V Azarenka (Brazil) B Haddad Maia	6	0	[10]
(Canada) L Fernandez (United States) T Townsend	4	6	[6]

== Seeded teams ==
The following are the seeded teams. Seedings are based on WTA rankings as of April 17, 2023.

Country	Player	Country	Player	Rank	Seed
USA	Coco Gauff	USA	Jessica Pegula	7	1
UKR	Lyudmyla Kichenok	LAT	Jeļena Ostapenko	18	2
USA	Desirae Krawczyk	NED	Demi Schuurs	21	3
AUS	Storm Hunter	BEL	Elise Mertens	28	4
USA	Nicole Melichar-Martinez	AUS	Ellen Perez	31	5
CAN	Gabriela Dabrowski	BRA	Luisa Stefani	34	6
JPN	Shuko Aoyama	JPN	Ena Shibahara	39	7
CHN	Xu Yifan	CHN	Yang Zhaoxuan	44	8

== Other entry information ==
=== Wildcards ===
- Erika Andreeva / Mirra Andreeva
- (Spain) Paula Badosa / (United States) Bethanie Mattek-Sands
- (Czech Republic) Brenda Fruhvirtová / (Czech Republic) Linda Fruhvirtová

=== Protected ranking ===
- (Chinese Taipei) Hsieh Su-wei / (Czech Republic) Barbora Strýcová
- (United States) Sofia Kenin / (Poland) Magda Linette
- Anastasia Pavlyuchenkova / (Kazakhstan) Elena Rybakina
