= 2023 Mutua Madrid Open =

- Date: 25 April − 7 May
- Edition: 21st (men); 14th (women)
- Category: ATP Tour Masters 1000 (men); WTA 1000 (women)
- Draw: 96S / 32D
- Prize money: €7,705,780 (men) €7,705,780 (women)
- Surface: Clay / outdoor
- Location: Madrid, Spain
- Venue: Park Manzanares

Champions

Men's singles
- (Spain) Carlos Alcaraz

Women's singles
- Aryna Sabalenka

Men's doubles
- Karen Khachanov / Andrey Rublev

Women's doubles
- Victoria Azarenka / (Brazil) Beatriz Haddad Maia
- Madrid Open

The 2023 Mutua Madrid Open was a professional tennis tournament played on outdoor clay courts at the Park Manzanares in Madrid, Spain from 25 April to 7 May 2023. It was the 21st edition of the event on the ATP Tour and 14th on the WTA Tour. It is classified as an ATP Tour Masters 1000 event on the 2023 ATP Tour and a WTA 1000 event on the 2023 WTA Tour.

This is the first year that the men's tournament was expanded to two weeks and the men's and women's singles draws were expanded to 96 players.

== Champions ==
=== Men's singles ===
- (Spain) Carlos Alcaraz def. (Germany) Jan-Lennard Struff 6–4, 3–6, 6–3
- This was Alcaraz's fourth title of the year and 10th of his career. It was his fourth Masters title and his second win in Madrid, also winning in 2022.

=== Women's singles ===
- Aryna Sabalenka def. (Poland) Iga Świątek 6–3, 3–6, 6–3
- This was Sabalenka's third title of the year and 13th of her career. It was her fifth WTA 1000 title and second win in Madrid, having won the title in 2021.

=== Men's doubles ===
- Karen Khachanov / Andrey Rublev def. (India) Rohan Bopanna / (Australia) Matthew Ebden 6–3, 3–6, [10–3]

=== Women's doubles ===
- Victoria Azarenka / (Brazil) Beatriz Haddad Maia def. (United States) Coco Gauff / (United States) Jessica Pegula 6–1, 6–4

== Points and prize money ==
=== Point distribution ===
| Event | W | F | SF | QF | Round of 16 | Round of 32 | Round of 64 | Round of 96 | Q | Q2 | Q1 |
| Men's singles | 1000 | 600 | 360 | 180 | 90 | 45 | 25* | 10 | 16 | 8 | 0 |
| Men's doubles | 1000 | 600 | 360 | 180 | 90 | 0 | —N/a | —N/a | —N/a | —N/a | —N/a |
| Women's singles | 1000 | 650 | 390 | 215 | 120 | 65 | 35* | 10 | 30 | 20 | 2 |
| Women's doubles | 1000 | 650 | 390 | 215 | 120 | 10 | —N/a | —N/a | —N/a | —N/a | —N/a |

* Players with byes receive first round points.

=== Prize money ===
The ATP and WTA will each play for a share of €7,705,780.

| Event | W | F | SF | QF | Round of 16 | Round of 32 | Round of 64 | Round of 96 | Q2 | Q1 |
| Men's singles | €1,105,265 | €580,000 | €308,790 | €161,525 | €84,900 | €48,835 | €27,045 | €16,340 | €8,265 | €4,510 |
| Women's singles | €1,105,265 | €580,000 | €308,790 | €161,525 | €84,900 | €48,835 | €27,045 | €16,340 | €8,265 | €4,510 |
| Men's doubles* | €382,420 | €202,850 | €108,190 | €54,840 | €29,300 | €15,780 | —N/a | —N/a | —N/a | —N/a |
| Women's doubles* | €382,420 | €202,850 | €108,190 | €54,840 | €29,300 | €15,780 | —N/a | —N/a | —N/a | —N/a |

_{*per team}
